= Sergey Karpovich =

Belarusian footballer

Personal information
- Date of birth: 29 March 1994 (age 32)
- Place of birth: Petrishki, Minsk Oblast, Belarus
- Height: 1.80 m (5 ft 11 in)
- Position: Right back

Team information
- Current team: Maxline Vitebsk
- Number: 66

Youth career
- 2007–2012: Dinamo Minsk

Senior career*
Years	Team	Apps	(Gls)
2012–2017	Dinamo Minsk	30	(0)
2013	→ Bereza-2010 (loan)	24	(0)
2015	→ Naftan Novopolotsk (loan)	11	(1)
2016	→ Minsk (loan)	14	(0)
2017	→ Gorodeya (loan)	12	(0)
2018	Torpedo-BelAZ Zhodino	18	(0)
2019–2020	Isloch Minsk Raion	57	(2)
2021	Kaisar	17	(0)
2021–2022	Baltika Kaliningrad	27	(1)
2022–2024	Neman Grodno	66	(7)
2025	Navbahor	15	(0)
2025–	Maxline Vitebsk	13	(0)
2026	→ Dinamo Minsk (loan)	9	(0)

International career^{‡}
2010–2011	Belarus U17	6	(1)
2012	Belarus U19	2	(0)
2013–2016	Belarus U21	34	(2)
2020–	Belarus	17	(0)
- * Club domestic league appearances and goals as of 8 September 2026 ‡ National team caps and goals as of 8 September 2025

Sergey Karpovich (Belarusian: Сяргей Карповiч; Russian: Сергей Карпович; born 29 March 1994) is a Belarusian professional football player who plays for Belarusian Premier League club Maxline Vitebsk and the Belarus national team.
