= Hryni =

Hryni Грыні (Belarusian)
- Village
- Location within Belarus
- Coordinates: 54°7′0″N 27°21′36″E
- Country: Belarus
- Region: Minsk Region
- District: Minsk District

Population (2009)
  - Total: 45
- Time zone: UTC+3 (MSK)
- Postal code: 223047

Hryni (Belarusian: Грыні; Russian: Грини, romanized: Grini) is a village in Minsk District, Minsk Region, Belarus. It is located 30 kilometres (19 mi) north of the capital Minsk. It is part of Sharshuny selsoviet.
