= Chachkava =

Agrotown in Minsk Region, Belarus

Chachkava Чачкава (Belarusian) Чачково (Russian)
- Agrotown
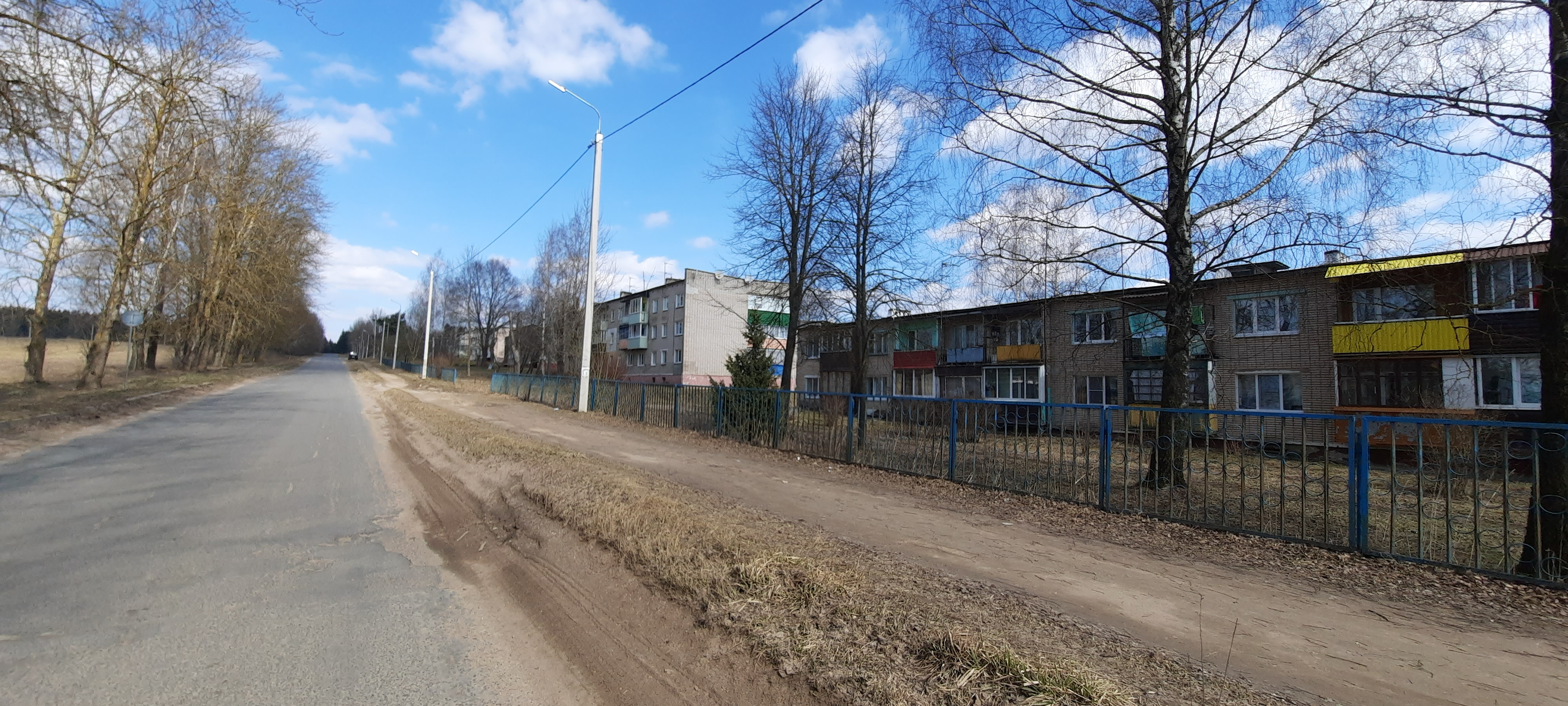

- Location within Belarus
- Coordinates: 53°53′35″N 27°12′05″E
- Country: Belarus
- Region: Minsk Region
- District: Minsk District

Population (2010)
  - Total: 1,047
- Time zone: UTC+3 (MSK)

Chachkava (Belarusian: Чачкава, romanized: Čačkava; Russian: Чачково, romanized: Chachkovo) is an agrotown in Minsk District, Minsk Region, Belarus. It is administratively part of Harani rural council. It is located about 14 kilometres (8.7 mi) from the Minsk Ring Road, west of the capital Minsk. In 2010, it had a population of 1,047.
