= Navasyellye =

Navasyellye, Navasellye (Belarusian: Наваселле), or Novoselye (Russian: Новоселье) may refer to:

- Navasyellye, Minsk district, Belarus
- Navasyellye, Pinsk district, Belarus
- Navasyellye, Orsha district, Belarus
- Navasyellye, Ushachy district, Belarus
- Navasyellye, Bildzyuhi rural council, Belarus
- Navasyellye, Luzhki rural council, Belarus
- Navasyellye, Rahachow district, Belarus
- Navasyellye, Shklow district, Belarus
- Navasyellye, Byerazino district, Belarus
- Navasyellye, Stowbtsy district, Belarus

== See also ==
- Novoselye, Russia
