= Astrashytski Haradok =

Agrotown in Minsk Region, Belarus

Astrashytski Haradok Астрашыцкі Гарадок (Belarusian) Острошицкий Городок (Russian)
- Agrotown
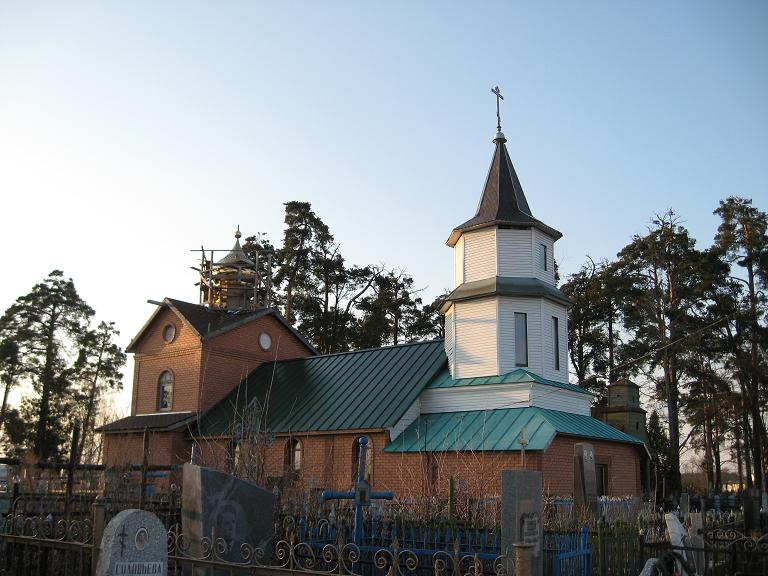

- Location within Belarus
- Coordinates: 54°03′52″N 27°41′34″E
- Country: Belarus
- Region: Minsk Region
- District: Minsk District

Population (2010)
  - Total: 2,383
- Time zone: UTC+3 (MSK)

Astrashytski Haradok (Belarusian: Астрашыцкі Гарадок, romanized: Astrašycki Haradok; Russian: Острошицкий Городок, romanized: Ostroshitsky Gorodok) is an agrotown in Minsk District, Minsk Region, Belarus. It serves as the administrative center of Astrashytski Haradok rural council. It is located 24 kilometres (15 mi) north of the capital Minsk and 15 kilometres (9.3 mi) from the agrotown of Kalodzishchy. In 1995, it had a population of 2,390. In 2010, it had a population of 2,383.
