= Shumilov =

Shumilov (Russian: Шумилов) is a Russian masculine surname, its feminine counterpart is Shumilova. It may refer to

- Anna Shumilova (born 1980), Russian rhythmic gymnastics coach
- Ekaterina Shumilova (born 1986), Russian biathlete
- Igor Shumilov (born 1993), Belarusian football player
- Mikhail Shumilov (1895-1975), Soviet Army General in World War II
