= Yuzufova =

Agrotown in Minsk Region, Belarus

Yuzufova Юзуфова (Belarusian) Юзуфово (Russian)
- Agrotown
- Location within Belarus
- Coordinates: 54°06′29″N 27°27′39″E
- Country: Belarus
- Region: Minsk Region
- District: Minsk District

Population (2010)
  - Total: 686
- Time zone: UTC+3 (MSK)

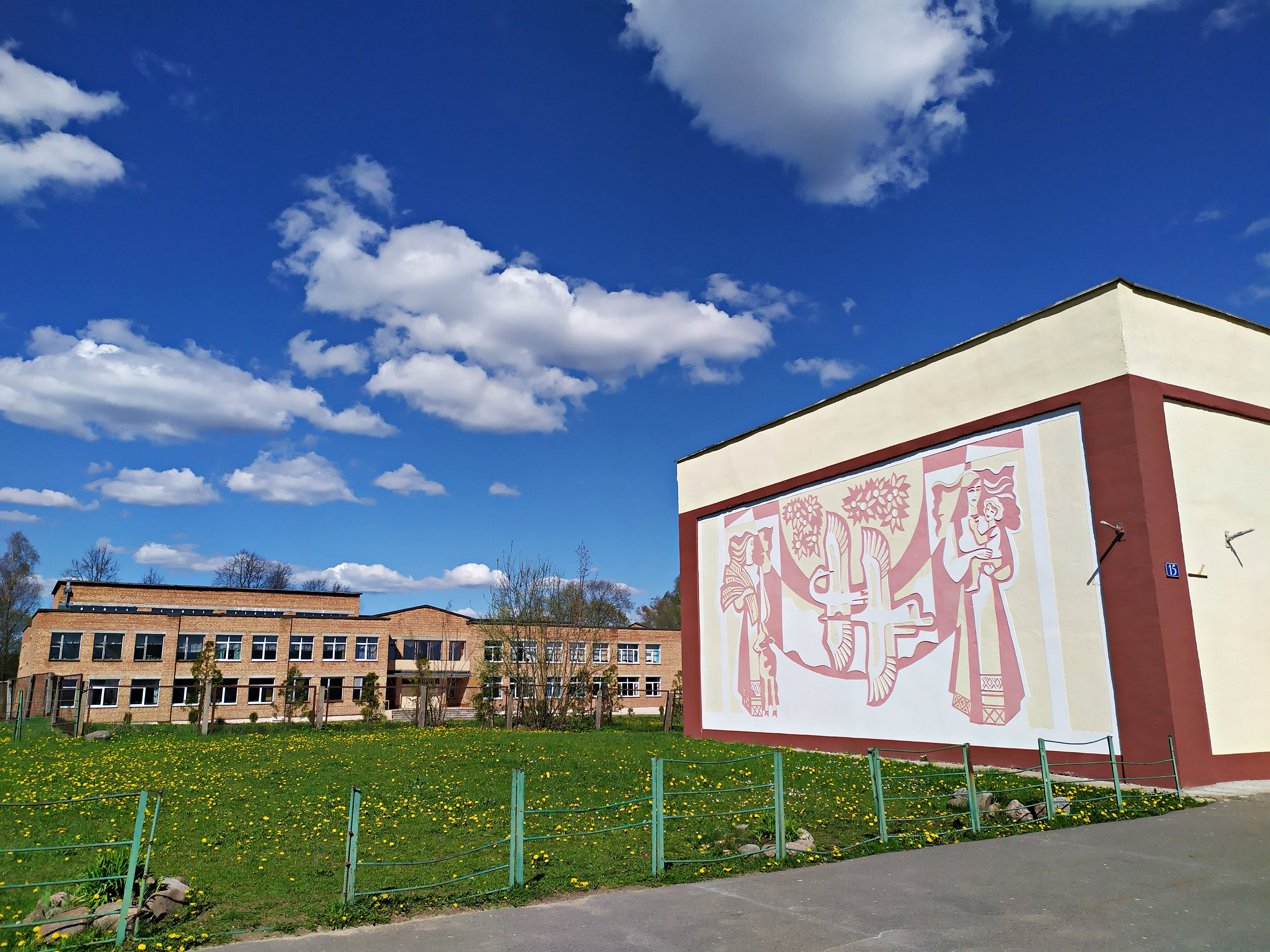
Yuzufovo, Minsk District, Minsk Region, Belarus

Yuzufova (Belarusian: Юзуфова, romanized: Juzufova; Russian: Юзуфово, romanized: Yuzufovo) is an agrotown in Minsk District, Minsk Region, Belarus. It serves as the administrative center of Yuzufova rural council. It is located 16 kilometres (9.9 mi) from the Minsk Ring Road, north of the capital Minsk. In 2003, it had a population of 633. In 2010, it had a population of 686.
