= Shchomyslitsa =

Agrotown in Minsk Region, Belarus

Shchomyslitsa Шчомысліца (Belarusian) Щомыслица (Russian)
- Agrotown
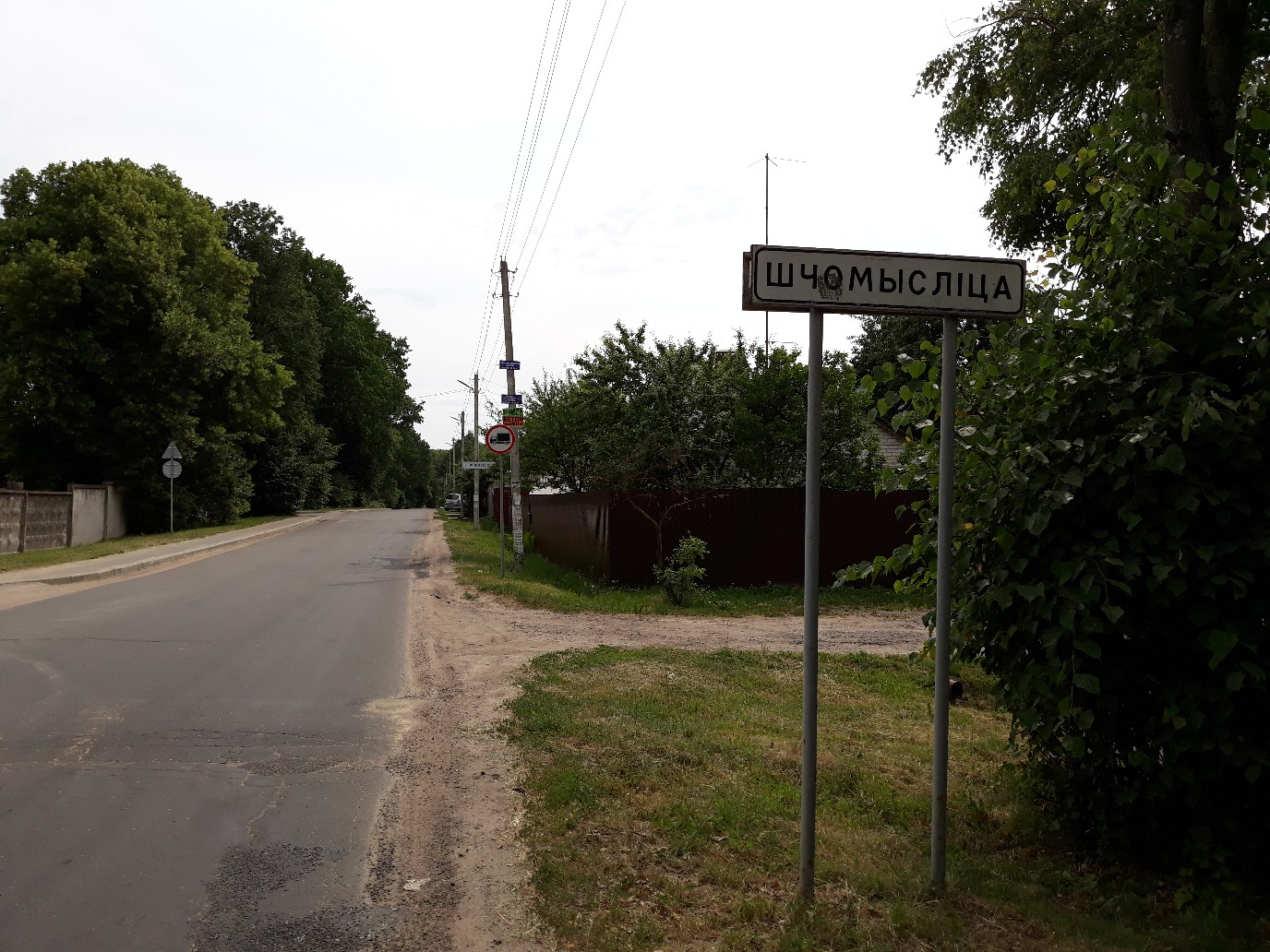

- Location within Belarus
- Coordinates: 53°49′20″N 27°27′05″E
- Country: Belarus
- Region: Minsk Region
- District: Minsk District

Population (2010)
  - Total: 2,011
- Time zone: UTC+3 (MSK)

Shchomyslitsa (Belarusian: Шчомысліца, romanized: Ščomyslica; Russian: Щомыслица) is an agrotown in Minsk District, Minsk Region, Belarus. It serves as the administrative center of Shchomyslitsa rural council. It is located nine kilometres (5.6 mi) southwest of the capital Minsk. In 2003, it had a population of 1,655. In 2010, it had a population of 2,011.
