= Lashany rural council =

Lashany rural council (Belarusian: Лашанскі сельсавет) may refer to:

- Lashany, Minsk district rural council
- be:Лашанскі сельсавет (Смаргонскі раён)
- be:Лашанскі сельсавет (Уздзенскі раён)
