= Khatsyezhyna =

Agrotown in Minsk Region, Belarus

Khatsyezhyna Хацежына (Belarusian) Хатежино (Russian)
- Agrotown
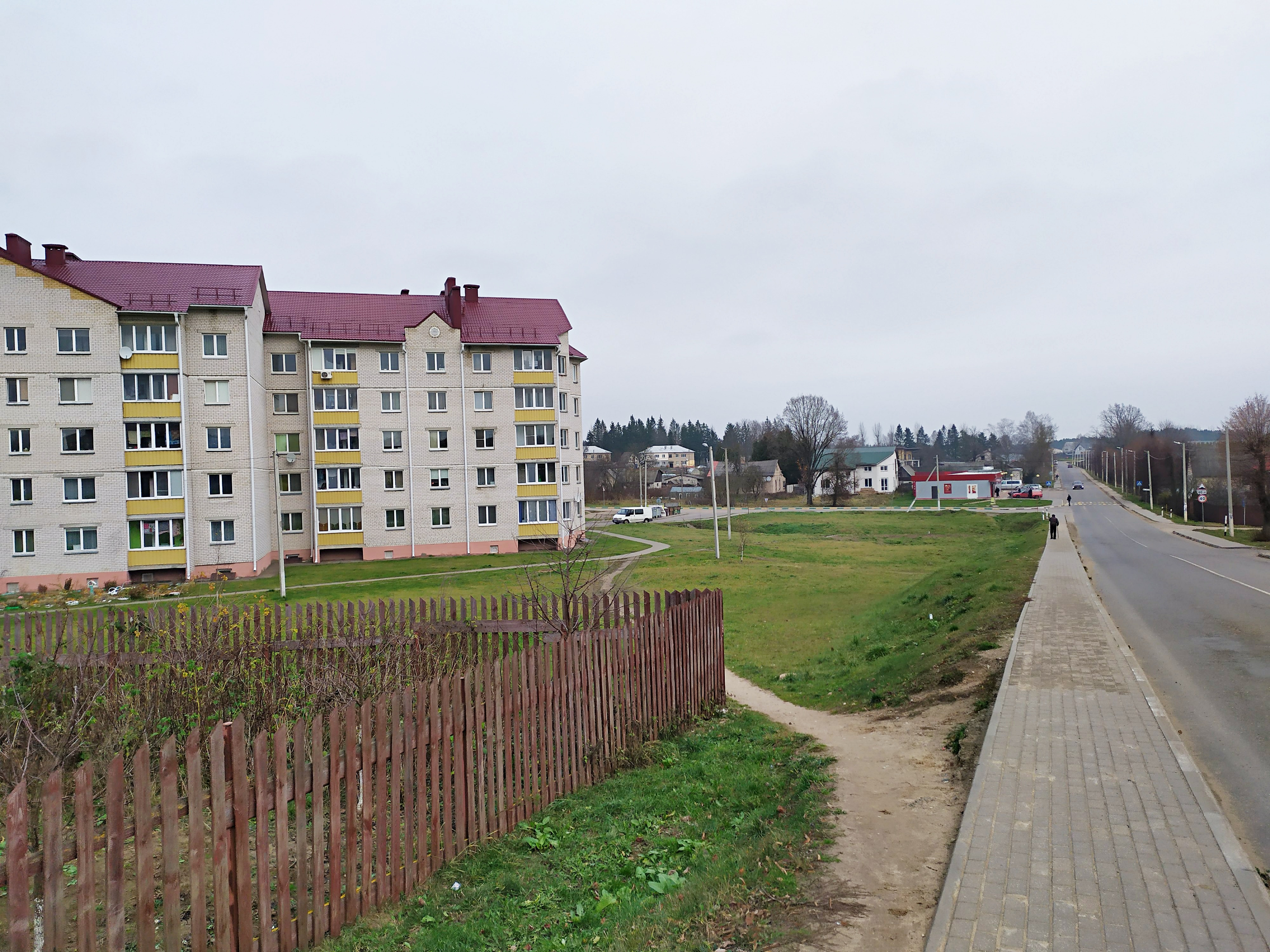

- Location within Belarus
- Coordinates: 53°54′48″N 27°18′25″E
- Country: Belarus
- Region: Minsk Region
- District: Minsk District

Population (2010)
  - Total: 1,485
- Time zone: UTC+3 (MSK)

Khatsyezhyna (Belarusian: Хацежына, romanized: Chaciežyna; Russian: Хатежино, romanized: Khatezhino) is an agrotown in Minsk District, Minsk Region, Belarus. It serves as the administrative center of Khatsyezhyna rural council. It is located six kilometres (3.7 mi) from the Minsk Ring Road, west of the capital Minsk. In 1997, it had a population of 921. In 2002, it had a population of 936. In 2010, it had a population of 1,485.
