= Lashany =

Lashany (Belarusian: Лашаны) or Loshany (Russian: Лошаны) may refer to the following places in Belarus:

- Lashany, Grodno Region, a village in Smarhon District, Grodno Region
- Lashany, Minsk Region, an agrotown in Minsk District, Minsk Region
