= Shchadrowshchyna =

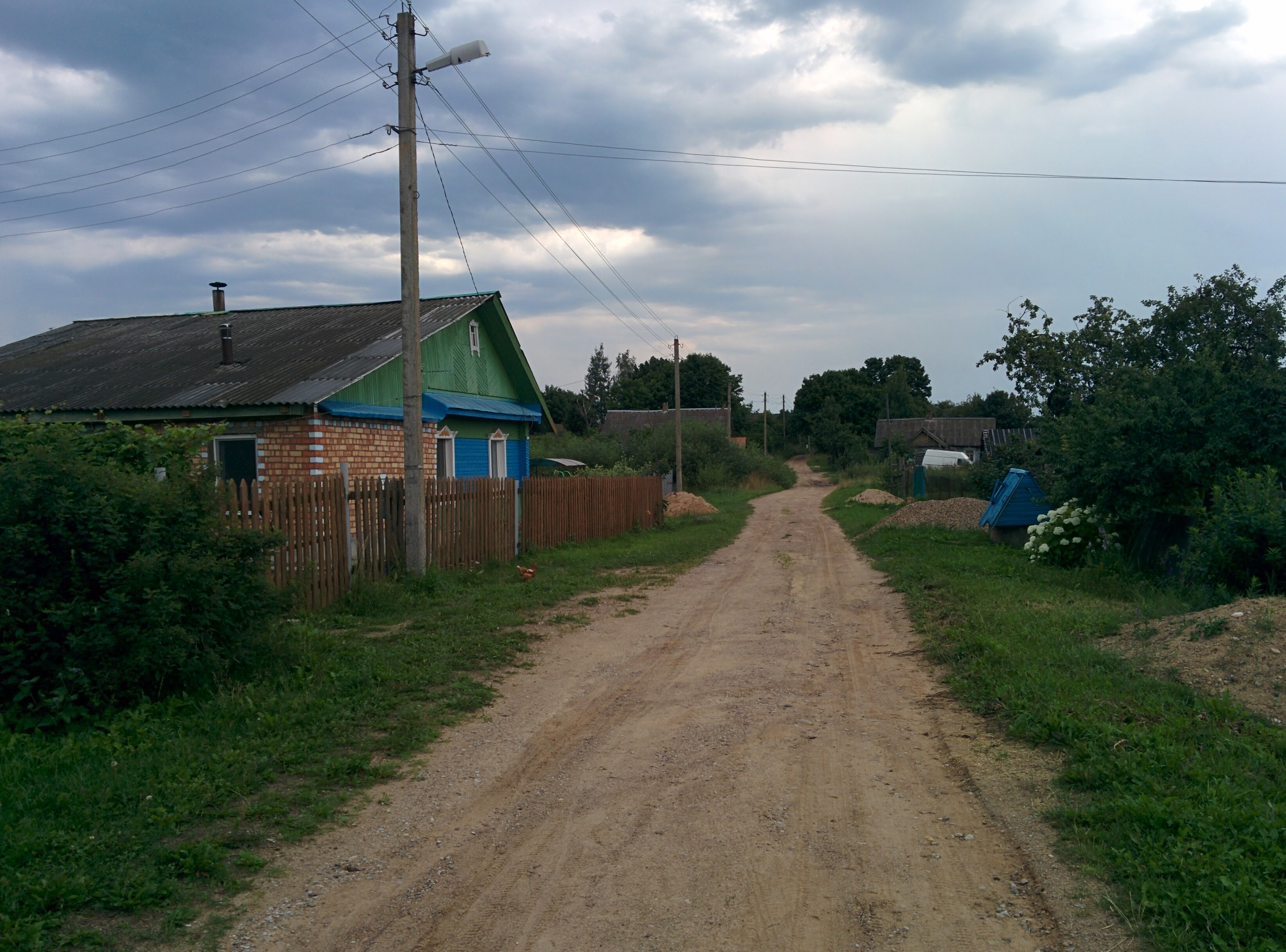

- Location within Belarus
- Coordinates: 54°9′15″N 27°21′55″E
- Country Subdivision: Belarus; Minsk Region
- Postal code: 223047

Shchadrowshchyna (Belarusian: Шчадро́ўшчына, Ščadroŭščyna; Russian: Щедровщина; Polish: Szczodrowszczyzna) is a village in Belarus. It is located in the Minsk District of Minsk Region, 30 km north of the capital Minsk. The Huyka river (Belarusian: Гуйка, Hujka) begins near the village.

== Population ==
- 18th century:
  - 1795 — 75 people (31 men, 44 women).
  - 1800 — 75 people (31 men, 44 women)
- 19th century:
  - 1847 — 60 parishioners (30 men, 30 women).
  - 1865 — 26 people.
- 20th century:
  - 1905 — 134 people (66 men, 68 women).
  - 1999 — 26 people.
- 21st century:
  - 2009 — 24 people.
  - 2012 — 13 people.
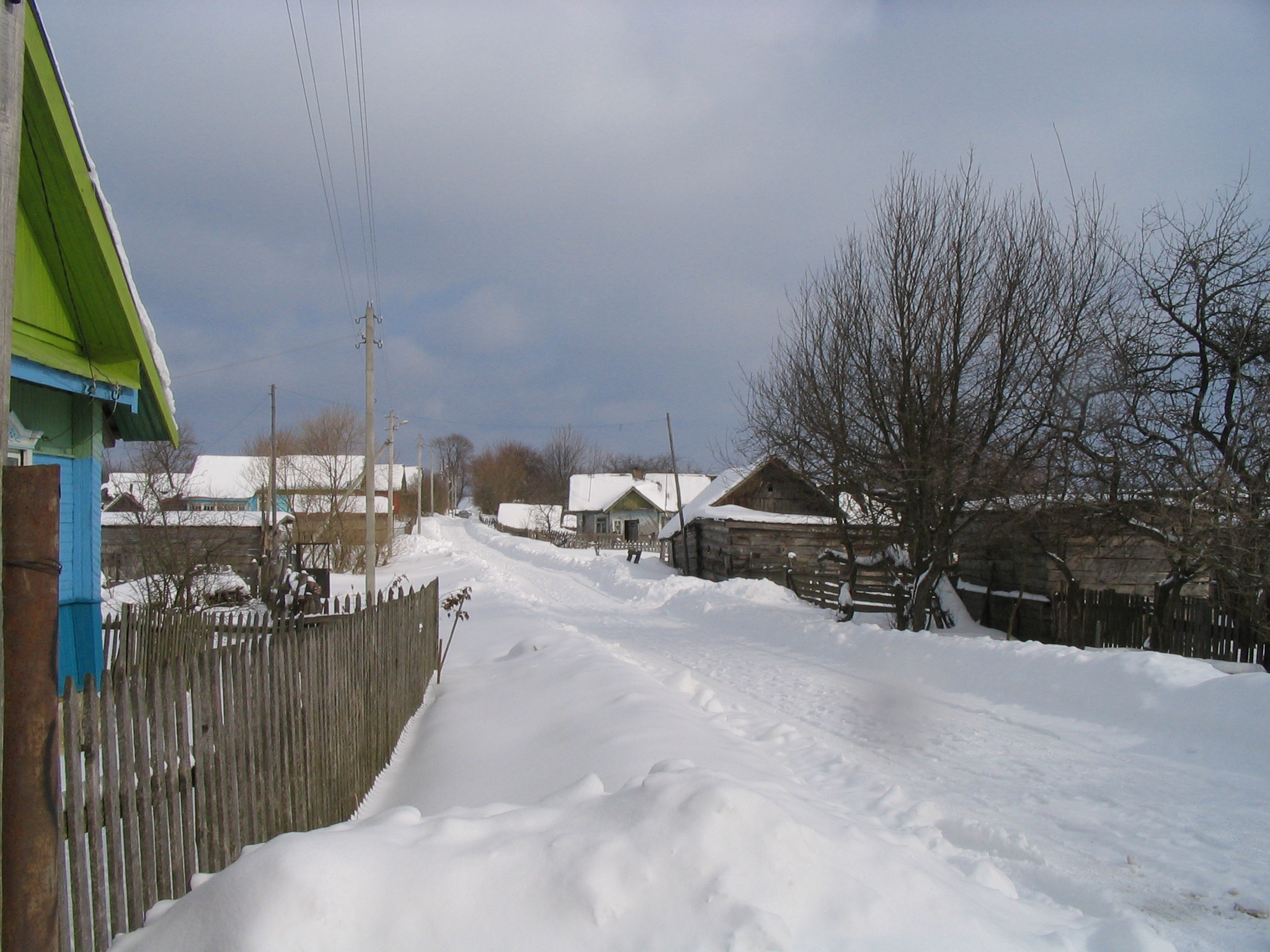

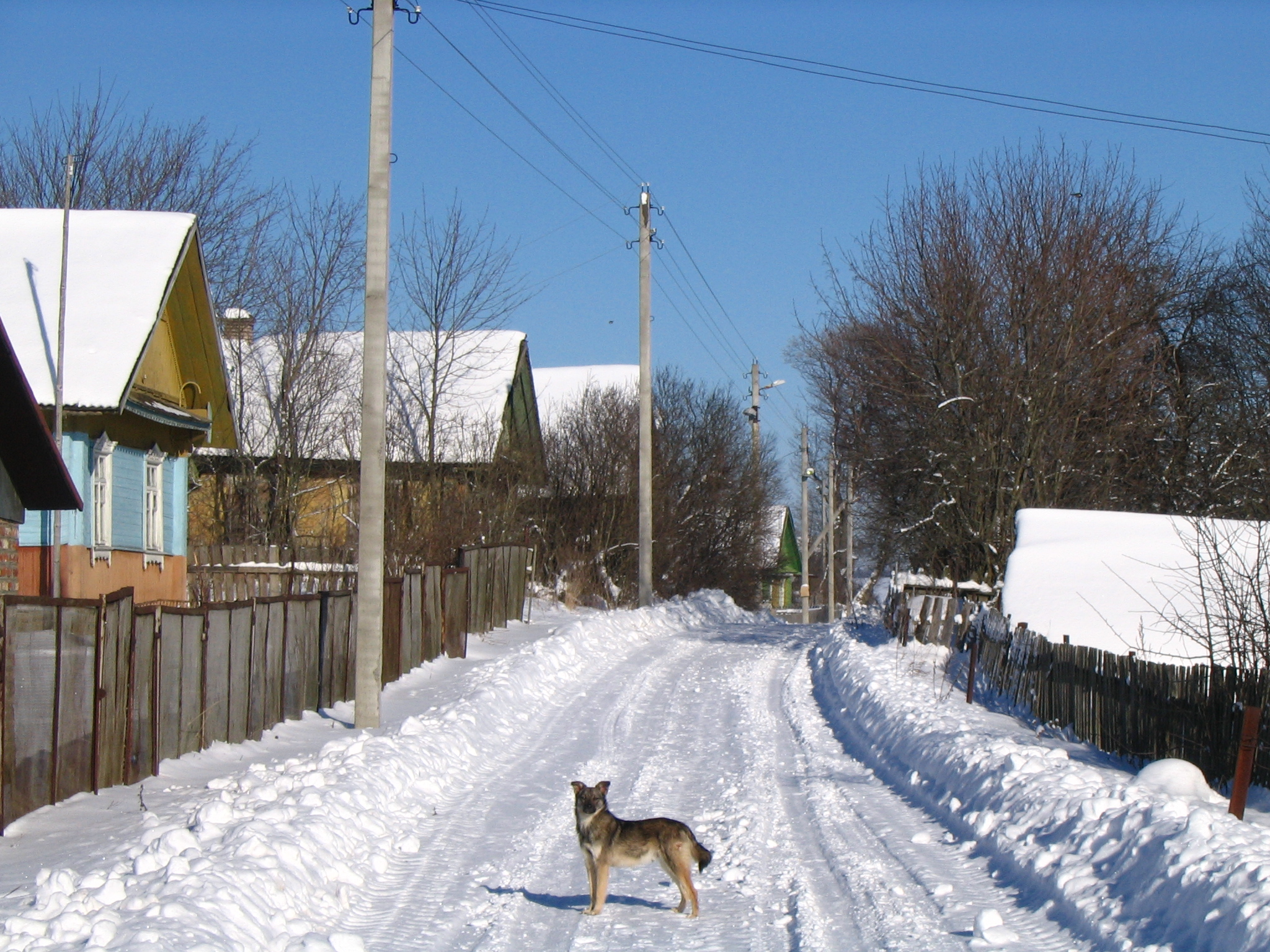

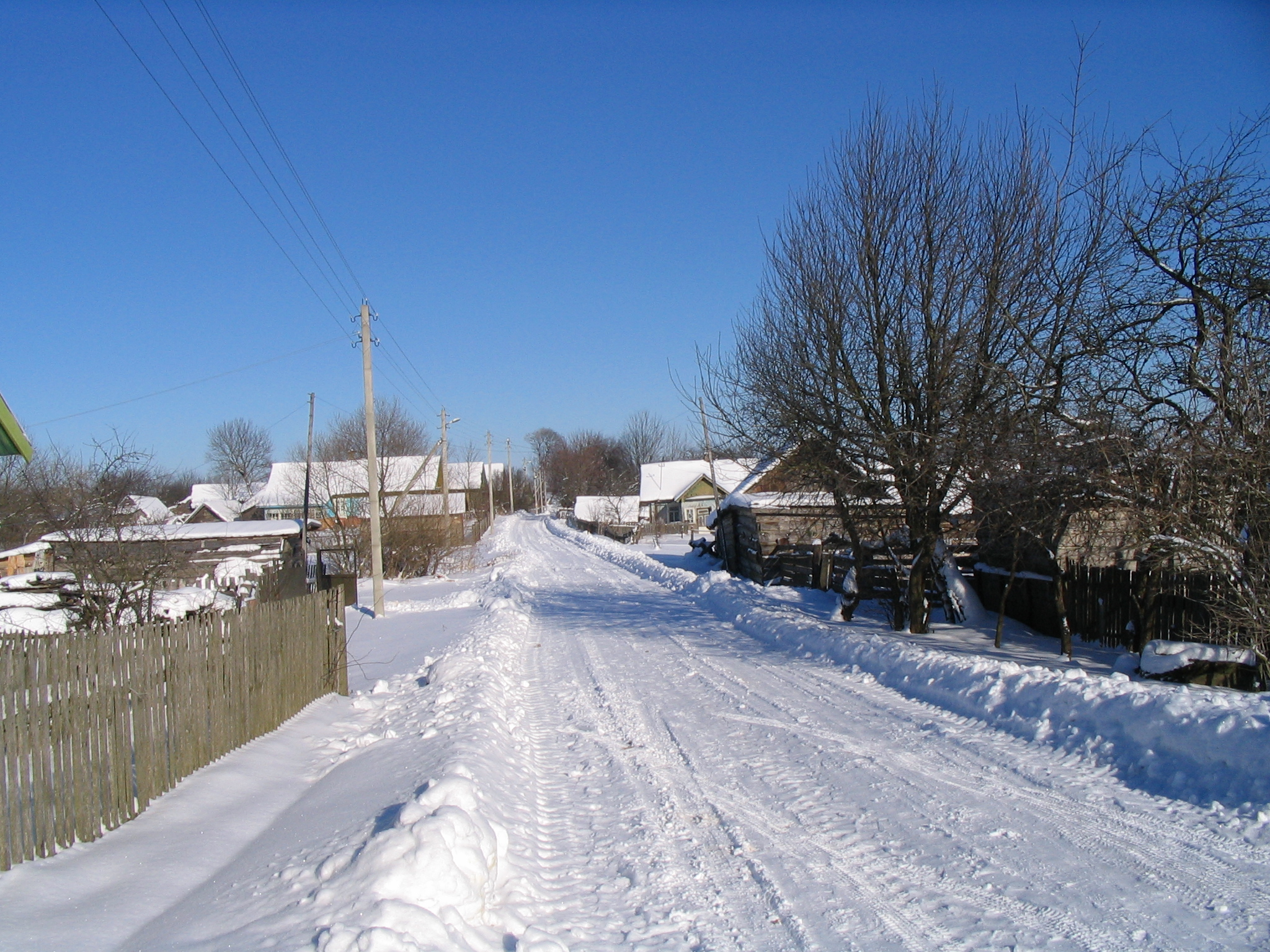

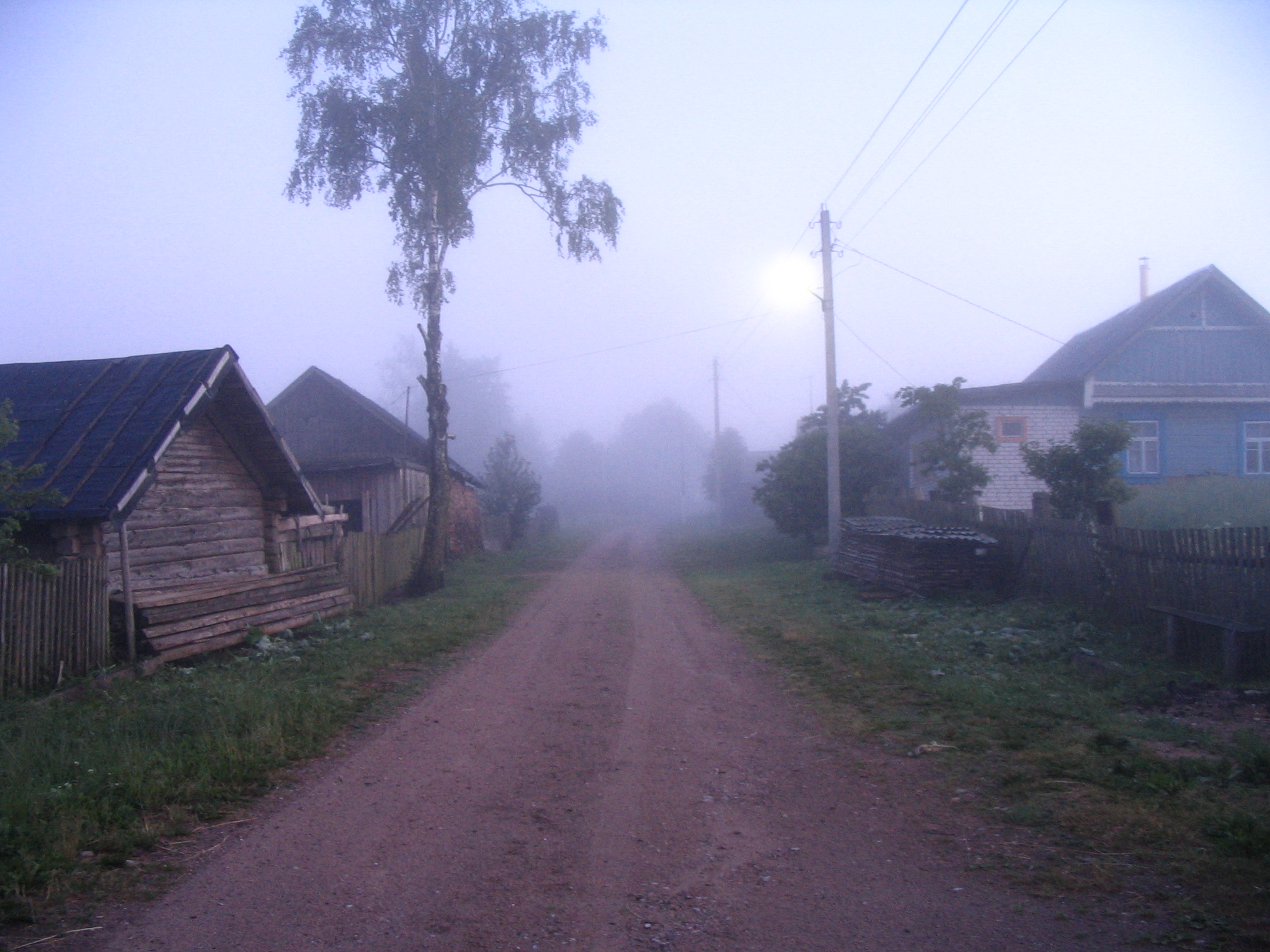

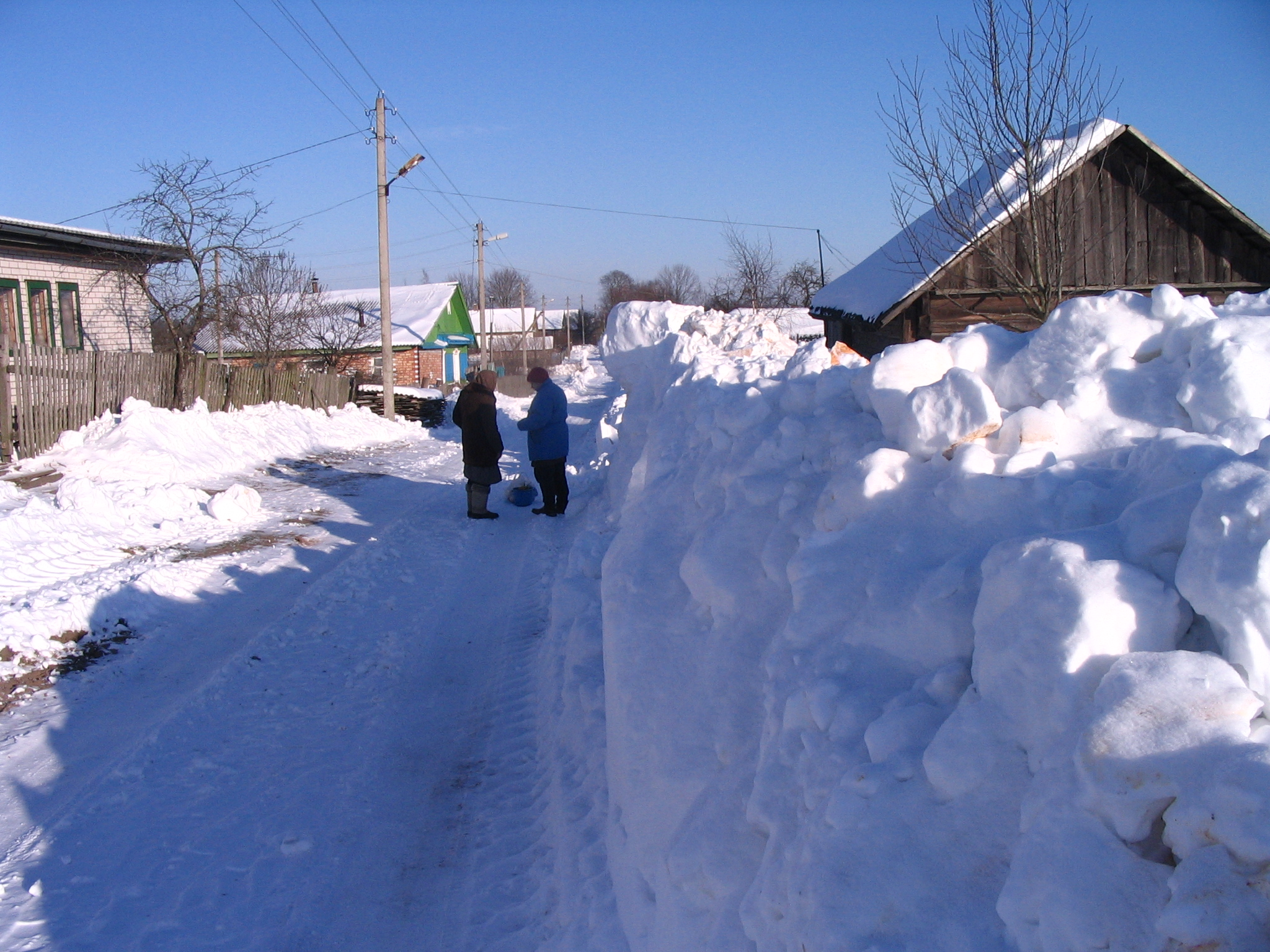
