= Pyatryshki rural council =

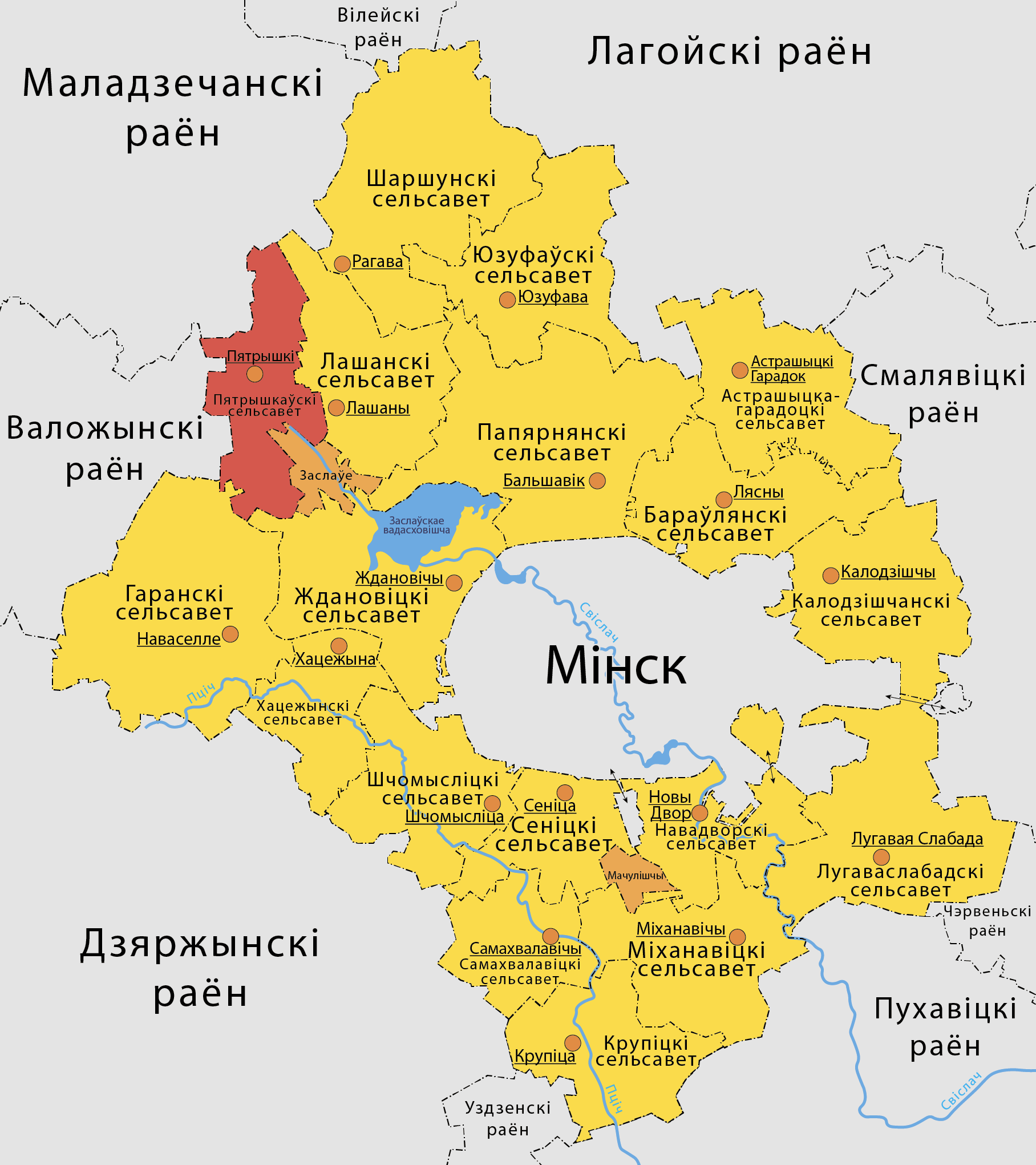
Map of Minsk District

Pyatryshki rural council (Belarusian: Пятрышкаўскі сельсавет; Russian: Петришковский сельсовет) is a lower-level subdivision (selsoviet) of Minsk district, Minsk region, Belarus. Its administrative center is the agrotown of Pyatryshki.

== Rural localities ==
The populations are from the 2009 Belarusian census (3301 total) and 2019 Belarusian census (4227 total)

Russian name	Belarusian name	Pop. 2009	Pop. 2019
д Анусино	в Анусіна	77	126
д Векшицы	в Векшыцы	46	48
д Венделево	в Вендзелева	37	21
д Ворошилы	в Варашылы	19	23
д Вязанка	в Вязанка	39	32
д Дички	в Дзічкі	24	99
д Должаны	в Даўжаны	16	53
д Ермаки	в Ермакі	13	14
д Захаричи	в Захарычы	70	85
д Кирши	в Кіршы	354	305
д Кисели	в Кісялі	28	19
д Кривое Село	в Крывое Сяло	57	65
д Крички	в Крычкі	122	120
д Липени	в Ліпяні	34	24
д Метково	в Меткава	14	19
д Недреска	в Недраска	65	115
д Новашино	в Навашыно	142	230
аг Петришки (Petrishki)	аг Пятрышкі (Pyatryshki)	1993	2423
д Светлый Путь	в Светлы Шлях	16	31
д Чернявщина	в Чарняўшчына	19	32
д Шубники	в Шубнікі	111	325
д Щёки	в Шчокі	5	18
