= Rahava =

Village in Minsk Region, Belarus

Rahava Рагава (Belarusian)
- Village
- Location within Belarus
- Coordinates: 54°7′33″N 27°17′59″E
- Country: Belarus
- Region: Minsk Region
- District: Minsk District

Population (2009)
  - Total: 71
- Time zone: UTC+3 (MSK)
- Postal code: 223047

Rahava or Rogovo (Belarusian: Рагава; Russian: Рогово) is a village in Minsk District, Minsk Region, Belarus located 30 kilometres (19 mi) north of the capital Minsk.

As of 2025 it is the administrative center of the Sharshuny rural council, for historical reasons. It is planned to move the administration to an agrotown, as with other rural councils that include agrotowns. Previously it served as the administrative center of Rahava rural council.
