= Syenitsa =

Agrotown in Minsk Region, Belarus

Syenitsa Сеніца (Belarusian) Сеница (Russian)
- Agrotown
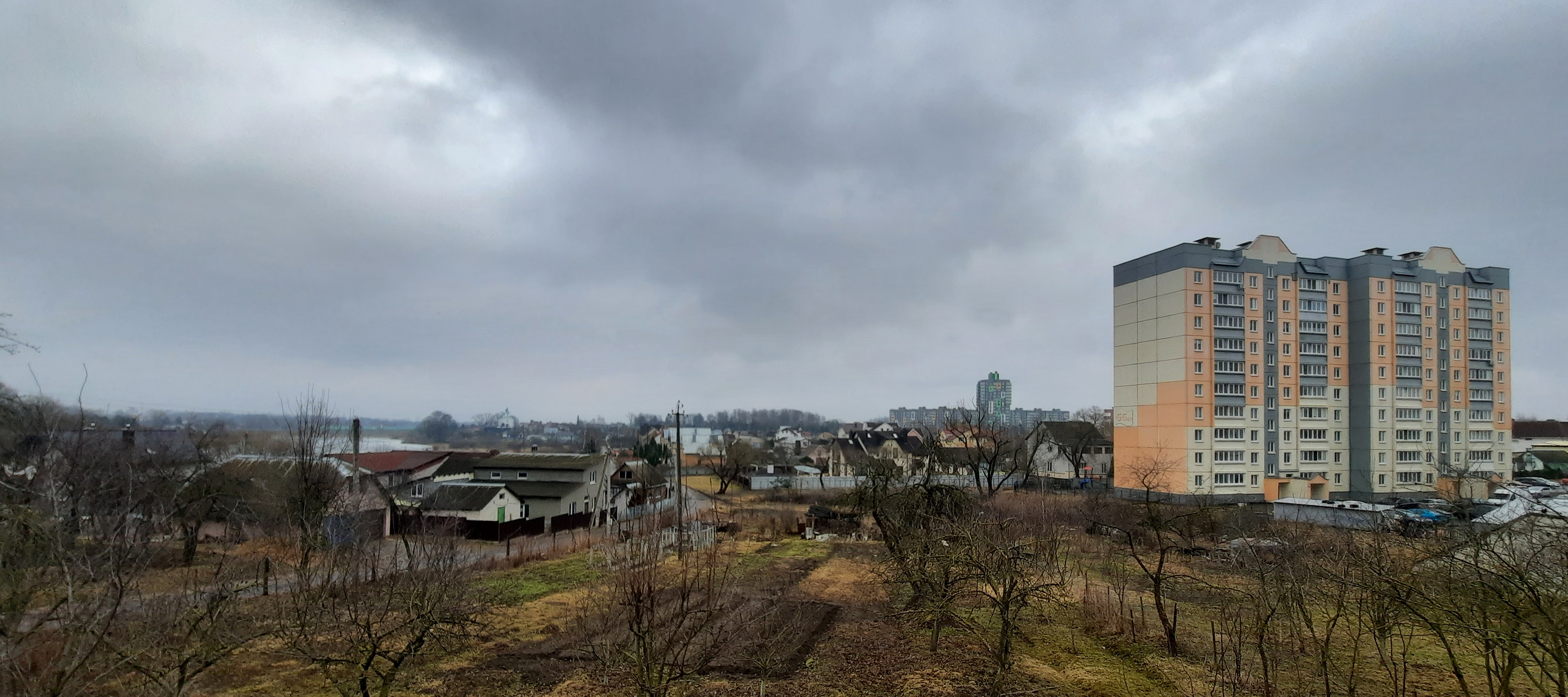

- Location within Belarus
- Coordinates: 53°49′41″N 27°31′39″E
- Country: Belarus
- Region: Minsk Region
- District: Minsk District

Population (2010)
  - Total: 3,336
- Time zone: UTC+3 (MSK)

Syenitsa (Belarusian: Сеніца, romanized: Sienica; Russian: Сеница, romanized: Senitsa) is an agrotown in Minsk District, Minsk Region, Belarus. It serves as the administrative center of Syenitsa rural council. It is located two kilometres (1.2 mi) from the Minsk Ring Road, south of the capital Minsk. In 2001, it had a population of 2,035. In 2010, it had a population of 3,336.
