= Harani rural council =

Harani rural council (Belarusian: Гаранскі сельсавет) may refer to:

- Harani, Minsk district rural council, Minsk region, Belarus
- Harani, Mogilev district rural council, Mogilev region, Belarus
- Harani, Polotsk district rural council, Vitebsk region, Belarus
