= Igor Shumilov =

Belarusian footballer

Personal information
- Date of birth: 20 October 1993 (age 33)
- Place of birth: Ozertso, Minsk Raion
- Height: 1.88 m (6 ft 2 in)
- Position: Defender

Youth career
- 2010–2012: Minsk

Senior career*
Years	Team	Apps	(Gls)
2012	Minsk-2	18	(1)
2013–2017	Minsk	55	(1)
2017–2019	Torpedo Minsk	46	(2)
2019–2020	Rukh Brest	11	(0)
- * Club domestic league appearances and goals

Igor Shumilov (Belarusian: Ігар Шумілаў; Russian: Игорь Шумилов; born 20 October 1993) is a Belarusian football referee and former player. He retired from playing in 2020 and started refereeing in 2021.
