= Krupitsa =

Agrotown in Minsk Region, Belarus

Krupitsa Крупіца (Belarusian) Крупица (Russian)
- Agrotown
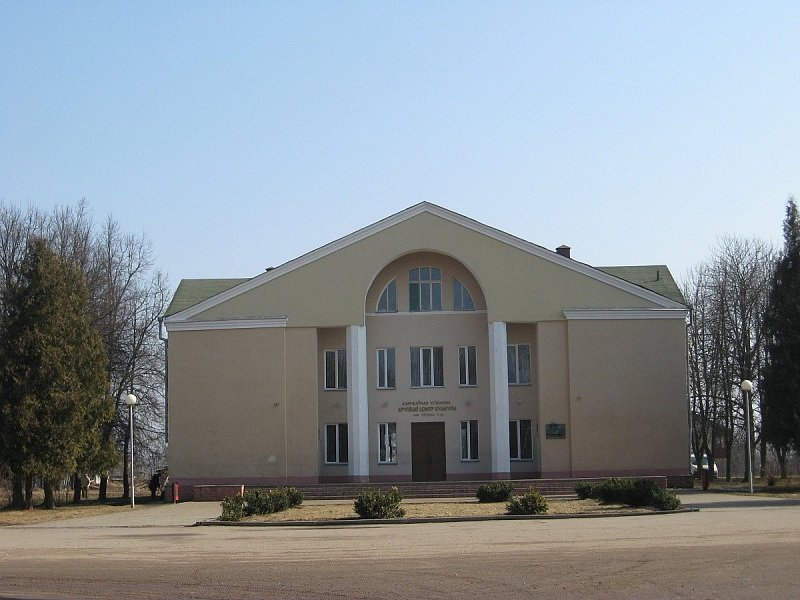

- Location within Belarus
- Coordinates: 53°40′53″N 27°32′01″E
- Country: Belarus
- Region: Minsk Region
- District: Minsk District

Population (2010)
  - Total: 1,011
- Time zone: UTC+3 (MSK)

Krupitsa (Belarusian: Крупіца, romanized: Krupica; Russian: Крупица) is an agrotown in Minsk District, Minsk Region, Belarus. It serves as the administrative center of Krupitsa rural council. It is located about 17 kilometres (11 mi) from the Minsk Ring Road, south of the capital Minsk. In 1998, it had a population of 897. In 2010, it had a population of 1,011.
