= Sharshuny rural council =

Rural council in Minsk District, Belarus

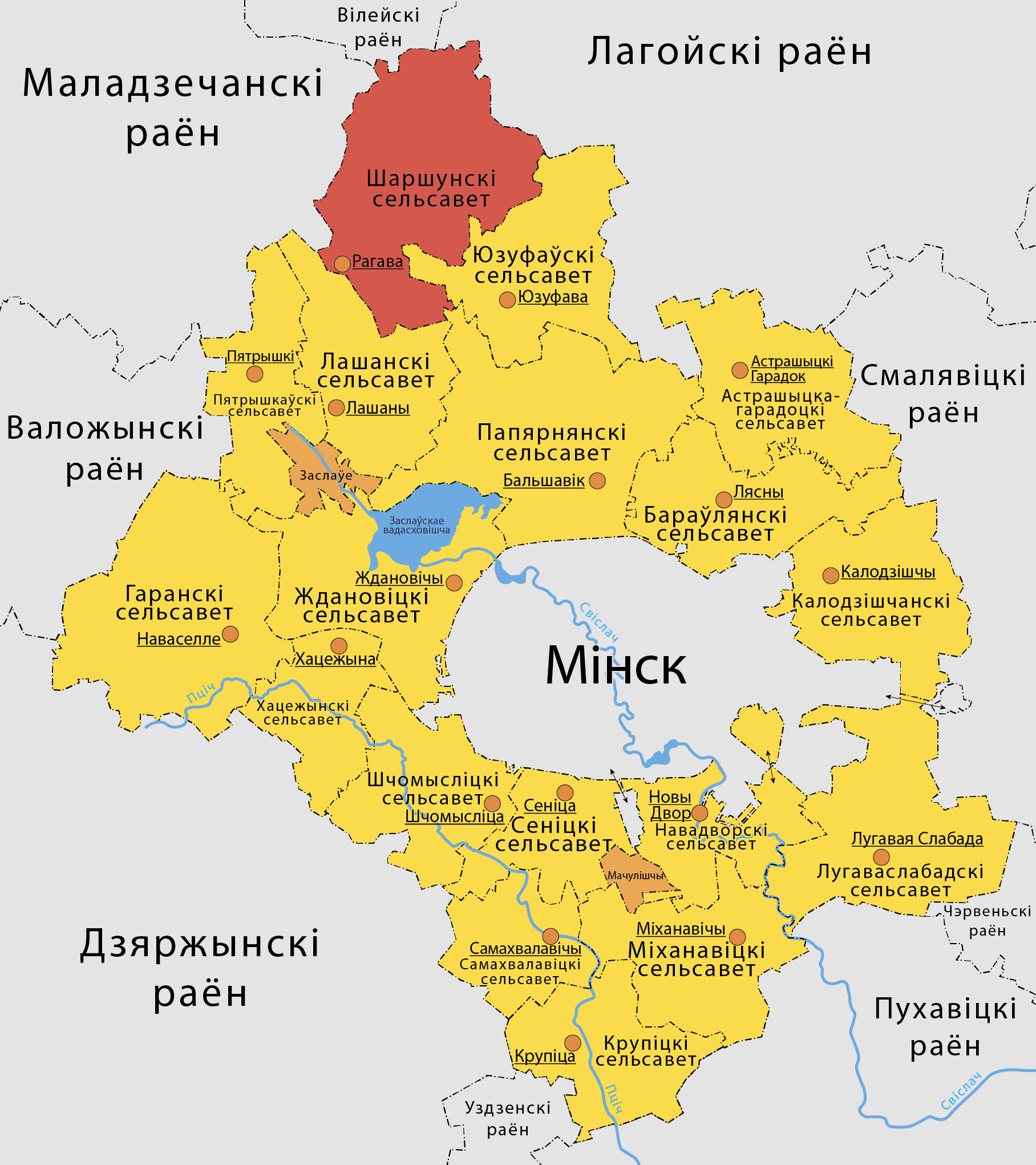
Map of Minsk District

Sharshuny rural council (Belarusian: Шаршунскі сельсавет; Russian: Шершунский сельсовет) is a lower-level subdivision (selsoviet) of Minsk district, Minsk region, Belarus.

The administrative center is the village of Rahava, for historical reasons. It is planned to move it to an agrotown, as with other rural councils that include agrotowns.

== Rural localities ==
The populations are from the 2009 Belarusian census (2140 total) and 2019 Belarusian census (1849 total)

Russian name	Belarusian name	Pop. 2009	Pop. 2019
д Ашнарово	в Ашнарава	31	22
д Бахметовка	в Бахметаўка	86	66
д Волковщина	в Воўкаўшчына	4	-
д Гайдуковка	в Гайдукоўка	1	-
д Головачи	в Галавачы	47	26
д Горы	в Горы	11	4
д Грини	в Грыні	45	48
д Дашки	в Дашкі	7	7
д Дворище	в Дворышча	18	15
д Довборово	в Даўбарова	5	11
п Довборово	п Даўбарова	27	19
д Жуки	в Жукі	38	32
д Збаровичи	в Збаравічы	19	14
д Каменец	в Каменец	79	51
д Камки	в Камкі	4	4
д Косачи	в Касачы	27	26
д Кукелевщина	в Кукелеўшчына	1	4
д Курганы	в Курганы	15	51
д Курневичи	в Курневічы	18	16
д Латыговка	в Латыгаўка	15	10
д Мидровщина	в Мідраўшчына	1	8
д Новый Двор	в Новы Двор	703	601
д Ожики	в Вожыкі	5	2
д Петьковичи	в Пецькавічы	25	19
д Пограничное Дворище	в Пагранічнае Дворышча	11	9
д Пухляки	в Пухлякі	40	21
д Ревкутьевичи	в Раўкуцевічы	59	39
д Рогово	в Рагава	71	26
д Слобода	в Слабада	10	7
д Средняя	в Сярэдняя	20	17
д Тонелево	в Танелева	6	4
д Хотяновщина	в Хацянаўшчына	10	8
д Чировичи	в Чыравічы	33	15
д Шершуны	в Шаршуны	22	15
аг Шершуны	аг Шаршуны	602	622
д Щедровщина	в Шчадроўшчына	24	10
