= Ernst Sabila =

Belarusian Protestant religious leader (1932–2022)

Ernst (Ernest) Sabila (Belarusian: Эрнст Сабіла or Эрнэст Сабіла, 18 March 1932 – 5 February 2022) was a Belarusian Protestant religious leader, dissident and Gulag survivor.

== Biography ==
Born in the village of Dziehciarouka (now part of Minsk District), SSR Belarus, USSR, he studied at the Minsk Medical Institute.

In 1951, while still a student, he was arrested by Soviet authorities and accused of religious and nationalist propaganda. He was sentenced to death.

In 1964, after 13 years in a Gulag labour camp, Ernst Sabila was released and returned to religious activism in Belarus. From the moment of his release, he was under constant surveillance of the KGB.

In 1988, he became presbyter of the Evangelian church of Belarus. In 1989, pastor Sabila took part in the founding conference of the Belarusian Popular Front.

From the late 2000s until his death, Sabila was among the members of the revived Belarusian Christian Democracy. He died on 5 February 2022, at the age of 89.
