= Shchomyslitsa rural council =

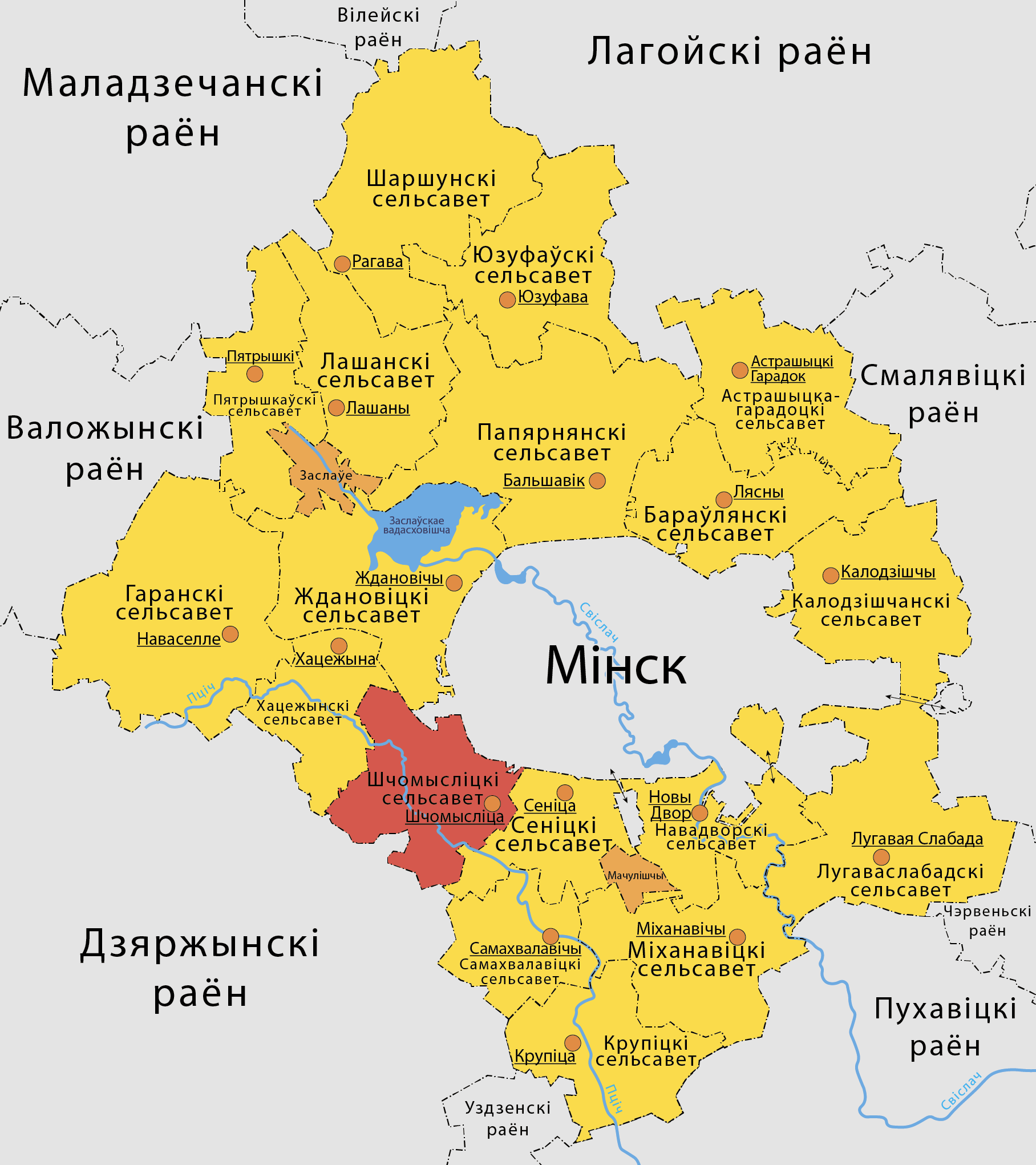
Map of Minsk District

Shchomyslitsa rural council (Belarusian: Шчомысліцкі сельсавет; Russian: Щомыслицкий сельсовет) is a lower-level subdivision (selsoviet) of Minsk district, Minsk region, Belarus. Its administrative center is the agrotown of Shchomyslitsa.

== Rural localities ==
The populations are from the 2009 Belarusian census (4989 total) and 2019 Belarusian census (9533 total)

Russian name	Belarusian name	Pop. 2009	Pop. 2019
д Антонишки	в Антанішкі	12	18
д Богатырёво	в Багатырова	104	3532
д Волковичи	в Воўкавічы	344	350
д Городище	в Гарадзішча	382	516
д Дворицкая Слобода	в Дворыцкая Слабада	42	78
д Заболотье	в Забалацце	159	220
д Лецковщина	в Лецкаўшчына	47	52
д Малиновка	в Малінаўка	354	334
д Новая Вёска	в Новая Вёска	15	22
д Новый Двор	в Новы Двор	53	87
аг Озерцо	аг Азярцо	1272	1343
д Поповичи	в Паповічы	68	84
д Прилукская Слобода	в Прылуцкая Слабада	177	586
д Прилучки	в Прылучкі	88	141
д Строчица	в Строчыца	61	102
д Ходаково	в Хадакова	32	182
аг Щомыслица (Shchomyslitsa)	аг Шчомысліца (Shchomyslitsa)	1779	1886
