= Navasyellye, Minsk district =

Agrotown in Minsk Region, Belarus

Navasyellye Наваселле (Belarusian) Новоселье (Russian)
- Agrotown
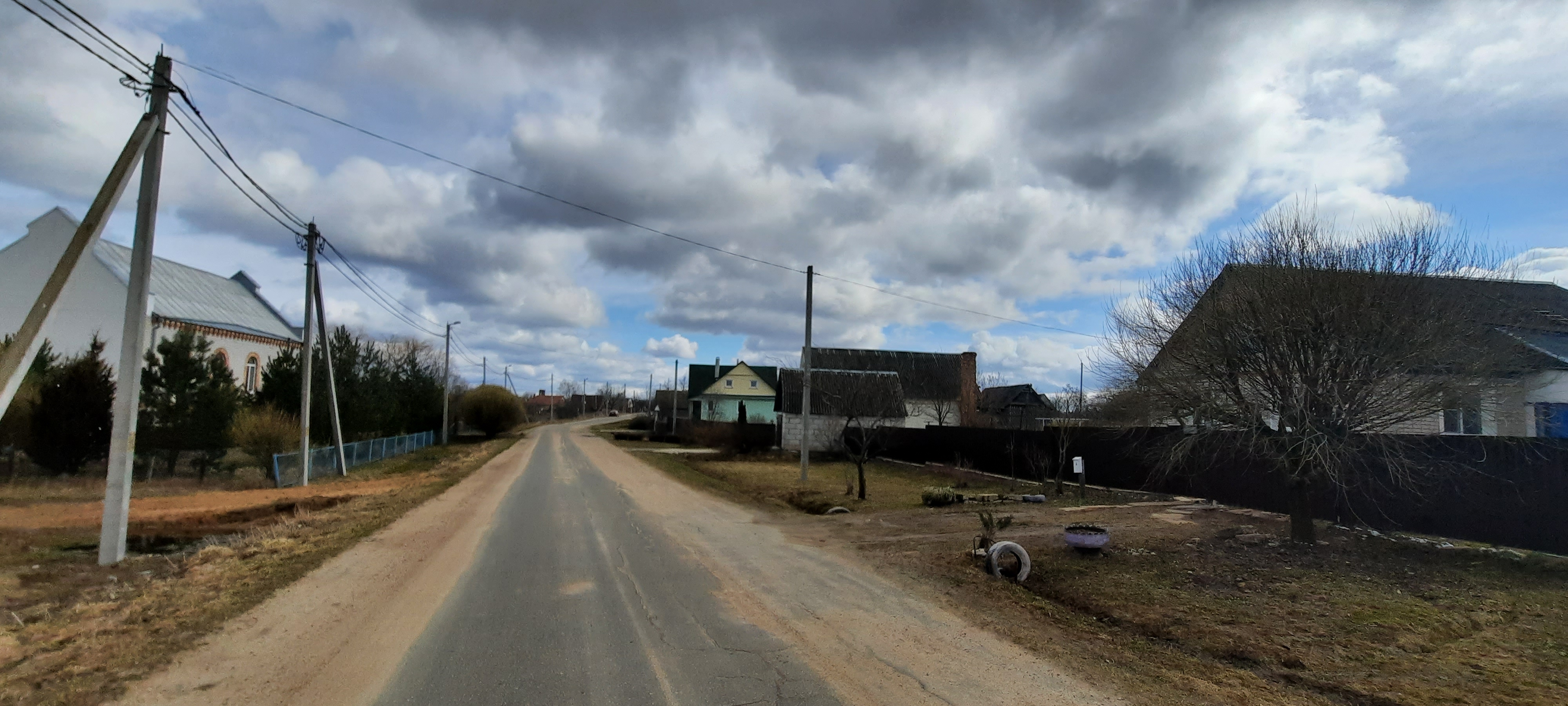

- Location within Belarus
- Coordinates: 53°54′55″N 27°11′36″E
- Country: Belarus
- Region: Minsk Region
- District: Minsk District

Population (2010)
  - Total: 1,231
- Time zone: UTC+3 (MSK)

Navasyellye (Belarusian: Наваселле, romanized: Navasiellie; Russian: Новоселье, romanized: Novoselye) is an agrotown in Minsk District, Minsk Region, Belarus. It serves as the administrative center of Harani rural council. It is located 24 kilometres (15 mi) west of the capital Minsk. In 1999, it had a population of 1,221. In 2010, it had a population of 1,231.
