= Krupitsa rural council =

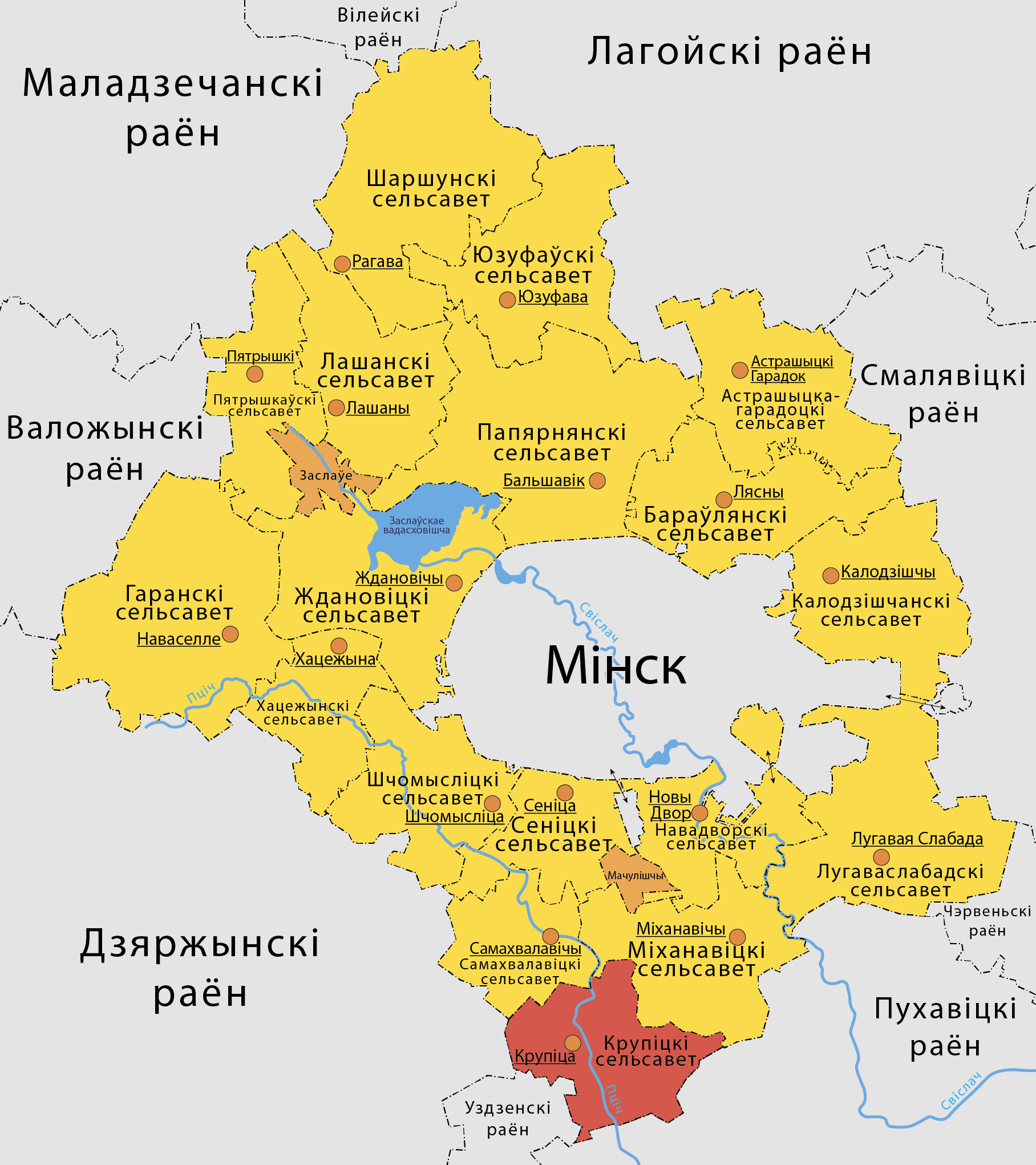
Map of Minsk District

Krupitsa rural council (Belarusian: Крупіцкі сельсавет; Russian: Крупицкий сельсовет) is a lower-level subdivision (selsoviet) of Minsk district, Minsk region, Belarus. Its administrative center is the agrotown of Krupitsa.

== Rural localities ==
The populations are from the 2009 Belarusian census (2,943 total) and 2019 Belarusian census (3,141 total)

Russian name	Belarusian name	Pop. 2009	Pop. 2019
д Аннополь	в Анопаль	524	510
п Аннополь	п Анопаль	6	12
д Вербники	в Вербнікі	44	40
д Вильгельмово	в Вільгельмова	-	2
д Вишнёвка	в Вішнёўка	134	132
д Дедовка	в Дзедаўка	50	29
д Дубинки	в Дубінкі	40	40
д Дубицкая Слобода	в Дубіцкая Слабада	66	55
д Еськовичи	в Еськавічы	31	33
д Загатье	в Загацце	20	16
д Закружка	в Закружка	104	74
д Каралино	в Караліна	101	118
д Кругляк	в Кругляк	39	29
аг Крупица(Krupitsa)	аг Крупіца (Krupitsa)	1029	1215
д Лозки	в Лозкі	13	10
д Паздерки	в Паздзеркі	43	35
д Пятевщина	в Пяцеўшчына	392	444
д Самуэлево	в Самуэлева	159	153
д Столбуновичи	в Стаўбуновічы	113	153
д Черники	в Чэрнікі	25	34
д Чернолески	в Чарналескі	10	7
