= Syenitsa rural council =

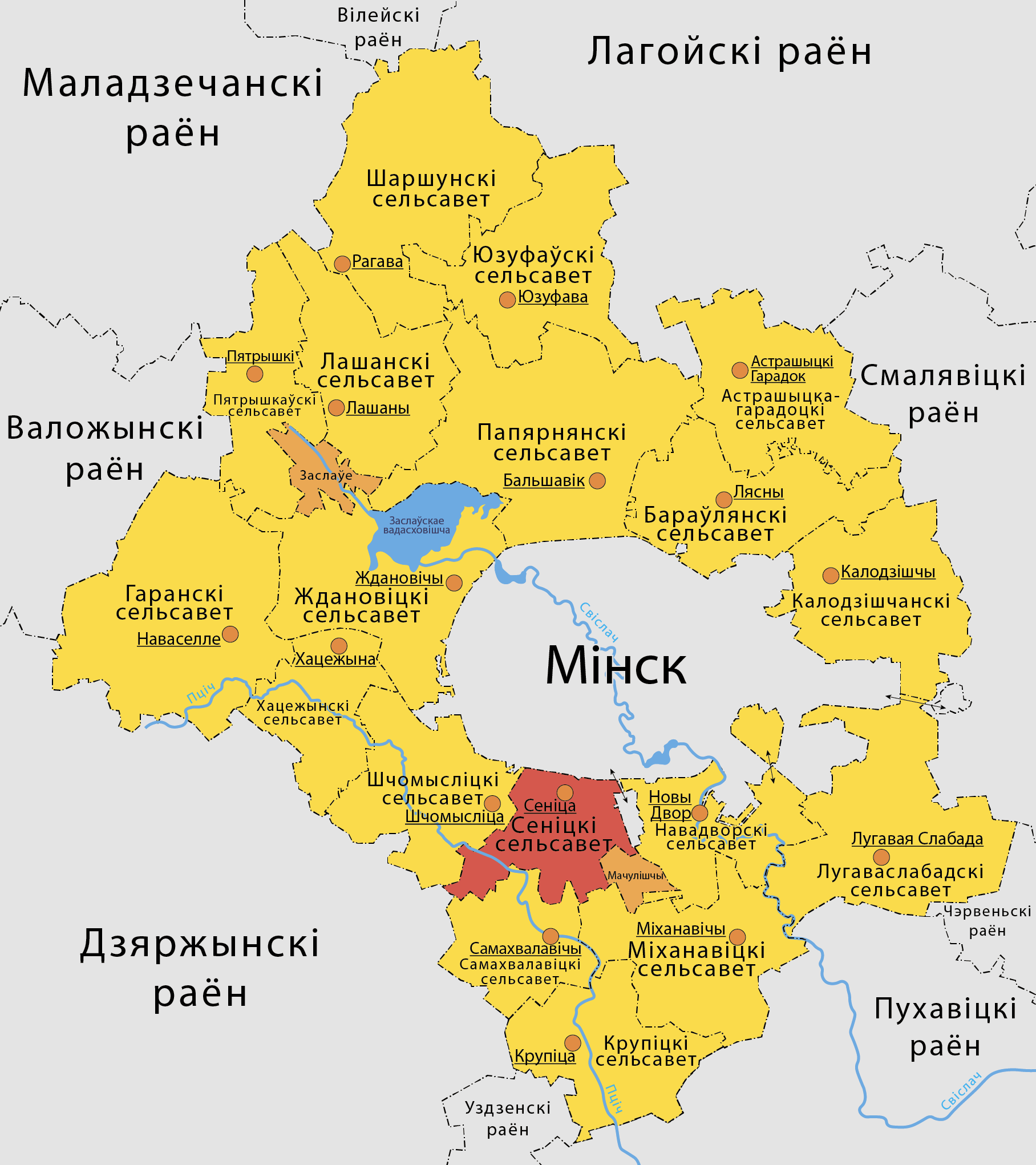
Map of Minsk District

Syenitsa rural council (Belarusian: Сеніцкі сельсавет; Russian: Сеницкий сельсовет) is a lower-level subdivision (selsoviet) of Minsk district, Minsk region, Belarus. Its administrative center is the agrotown of Syenitsa.

== Rural localities ==
The populations are from the 2009 Belarusian census (10236 total) and 2019 Belarusian census (22786 total)

Russian name	Belarusian name	Pop. 2009	Pop. 2019
аг Атолино	аг Атоліна	1517	2201
д Канютичи	в Канюцічы	191	177
д Колядичи	в Калядзічы	463	497
д Копиевичи	в Капіевічы	126	119
д Кохановщина	в Каханаўшчына	128	110
д Леонтьевичи	в Лявонцавічы	110	121
д Подгай	в Падгай	108	107
аг Прилуки	аг Прылукі	1514	5876
аг Сеница (Senitsa)	аг Сеніца (Syenitsa)	2242	7776
д Скориничи	в Скарынічы	334	321
п Скориничи	п Скарынічы	262	307
д Урожайная	в Ураджайная	336	312
д Щитомиричи	в Шчытомірычы	327	434
п Юбилейный	п Юбілейны	2578	4428
