= Lashany, Minsk region =

Agrotown in Minsk Region, Belarus

Lashany Лашаны (Belarusian) Лошаны (Russian)
- Agrotown
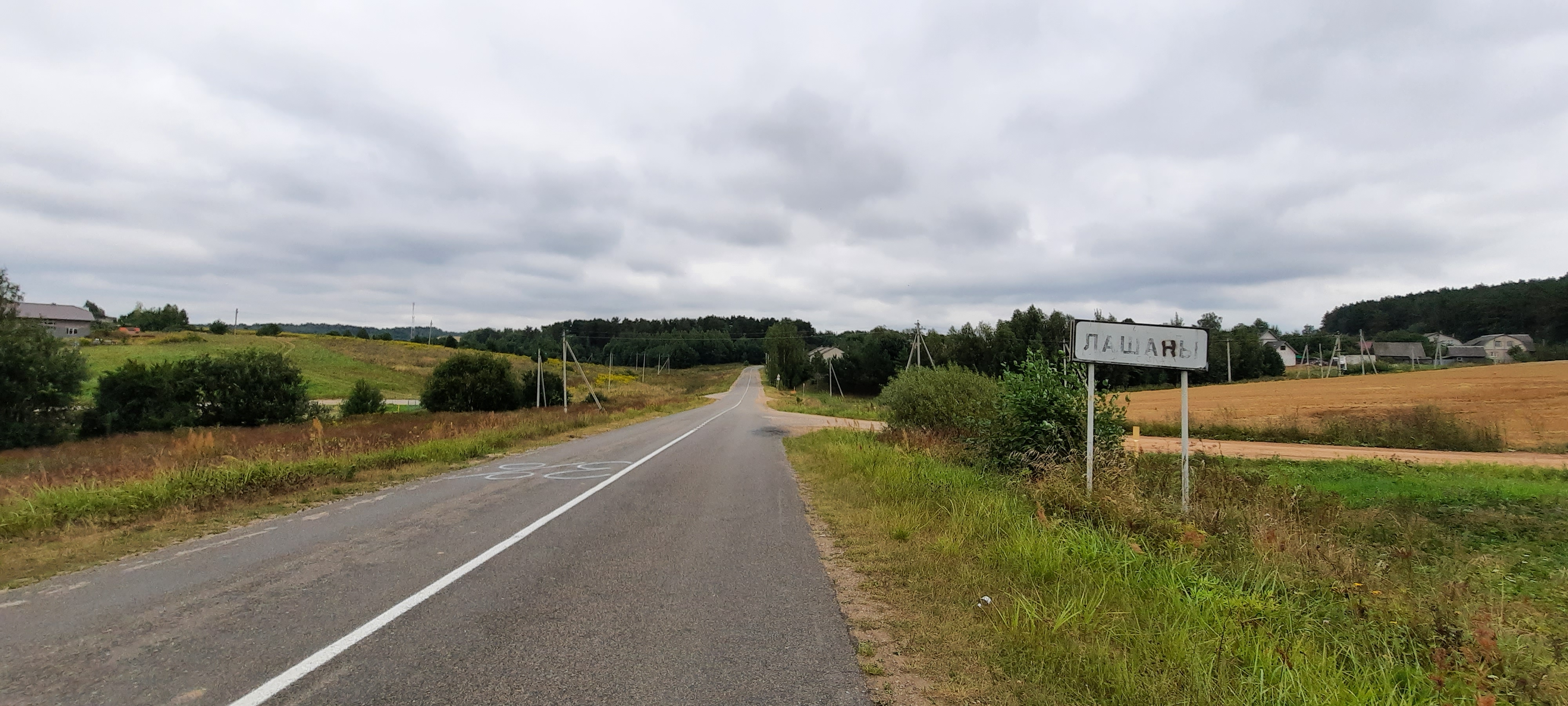

- Location within Belarus
- Coordinates: 54°02′25″N 27°18′00″E
- Country: Belarus
- Region: Minsk Region
- District: Minsk District

Population (2010)
  - Total: 654
- Time zone: UTC+3 (MSK)

Lashany (Belarusian: Лашаны, romanized: Lašany; Russian: Лошаны, romanized: Loshany) is an agrotown in Minsk District, Minsk Region, Belarus. It serves as the administrative center of Lashany rural council. It is located 26 kilometres (16 mi) northwest of the capital Minsk. In 1998, it had a population of 539. In 2010, it had a population of 654.
