= Yuzufova rural council =

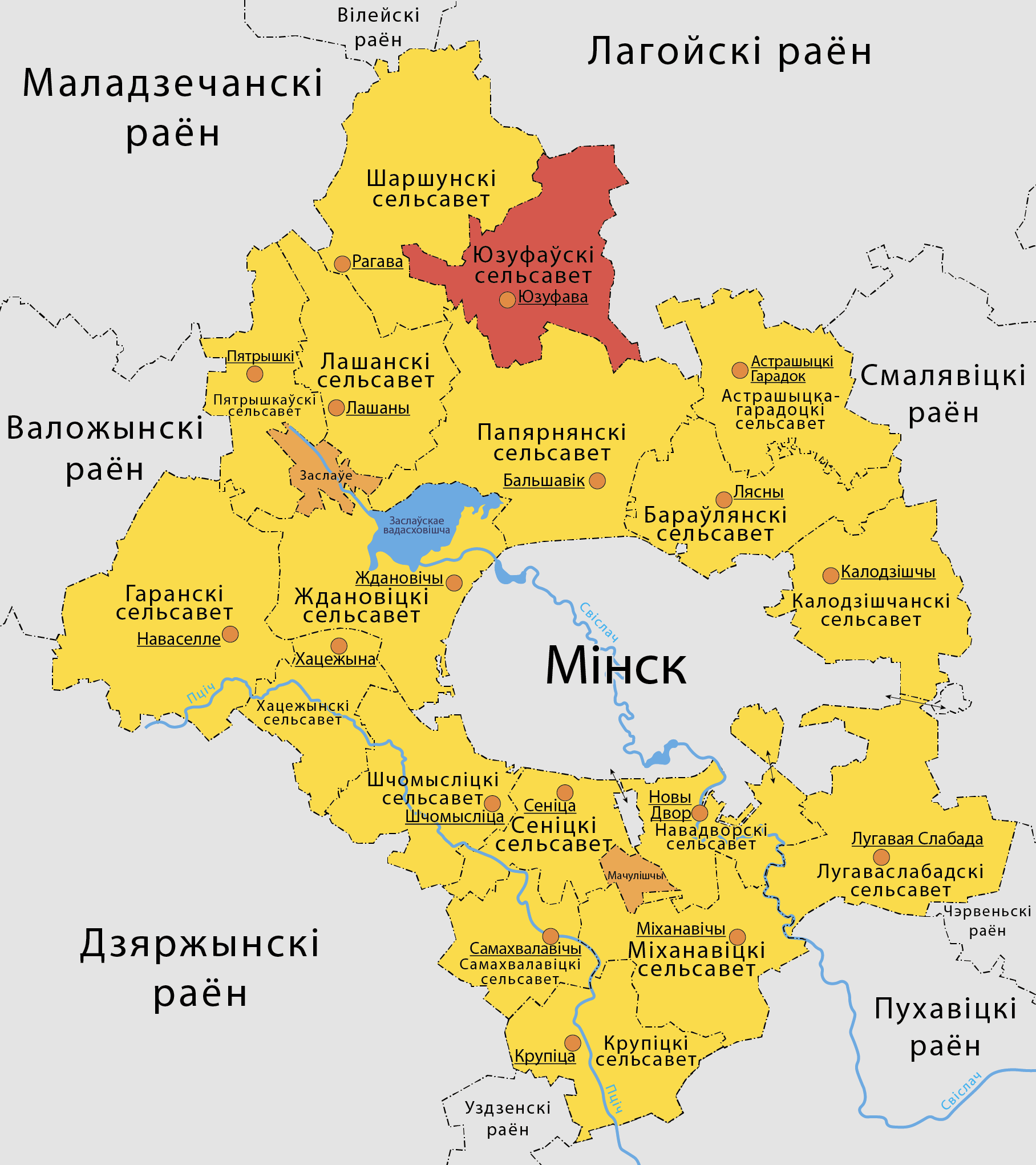
Map of Minsk District

Yuzufova rural council (Belarusian: Юзуфоўскі сельсавет, Russian: Юзуфовский сельсовет, is a lower-level subdivision (selsoviet) of Minsk district, Minsk region, Belarus. Its administrative center is the agrotown of Yuzufova.

== Rural localities ==
The populations are from the 2009 Belarusian census (1,939 total) and 2019 Belarusian census (2,105 total)

| Russian name | Belarusian name | Pop. 2009 | Pop. 2019 |
|---|---|---|---|
| д Абрицкая Слобода | в Абрыцкая Слабада | 1 | 7 |
| д Буды | в Буды | 4 | 2 |
| д Буцевичи | в Буцэвічы | 28 | 49 |
| д Гаёк | в Гаёк | 23 | 47 |
| д Гатовино | в Гатовіна | 47 | 50 |
| д Жабовщина | в Жабаўшчына | 3 | 4 |
| д Жуковка | в Жукаўка | 19 | 15 |
| д Казеково | в Казекава | 76 | 87 |
| д Комсомолец | в Камсамолец | 349 | 366 |
| д Лекоревка | в Лекараўка | 26 | 20 |
| д Лесины | в Лясіны | 52 | 43 |
| д Лысая Гора | в Лысая Гара | 93 | 64 |
| д Лысовичи | в Лысавічы | 35 | 35 |
| д Лусково | в Лускава | 137 | 126 |
| д Масловичи | в Маславічы | 93 | 224 |
| д Мацки | в Мацкі | 17 | 20 |
| д Пунище | в Пунішча | 10 | 7 |
| д Сады | в Сады | 23 | 18 |
| д Соломоречье | в Саламарэчча | 82 | 102 |
| д Угляны | в Вугляны | 39 | 45 |
| д Черники | в Чэрнікі | - | - |
| д Шепели | в Шапялі | 78 | 82 |
| аг Юзуфово (Yuzufovo) | аг Юзуфова ( Yuzufova) | 704 | 692 |
