= Khatsyezhyna rural council =

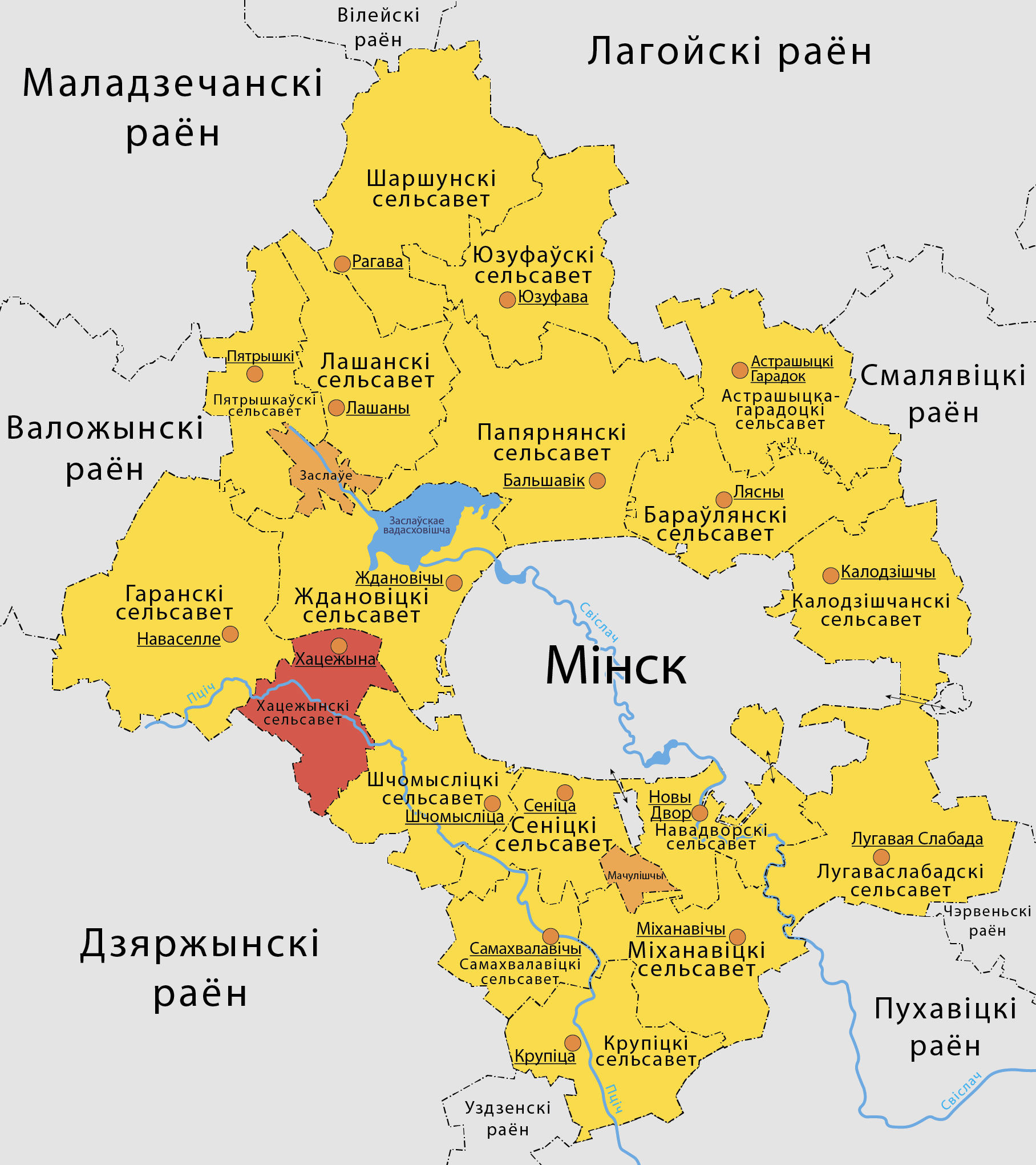
Map of Minsk District

Khatsyezhyna rural council (Belarusian: Хацежынскі сельсавет; Russian: Хатежинский сельсовет) is a lower-level subdivision (selsoviet) of Minsk district, Minsk region, Belarus. Its administrative center is the village of Khatsyezhyna.

== Rural localities ==
The populations are from the 2009 Belarusian census (2,265 total) and 2019 Belarusian census (4,783 total)

Russian name	Belarusian name	Pop. 2009	Pop. 2019
д Богушово	в Багушова	86	165
д Васьковщина	в Васькаўшчына	42	49
д Гаище	в Гаішча	65	75
д Головки	в Галоўкі	80	150
д Дубенцы	в Дубянцы	32	50
д Клюи	в Клюі	20	20
д Козловка	в Казлоўка	53	63
д Малашки	в Малашкі	-	9
д Новая Веска	в Новая Вёска	24	45
д Ореховская	в Арэхаўская	4	16
д Пигасово	в Пігасава	23	14
д Птичь	в Пціч	190	301
д Рыжики	в Рыжыкі	12	10
д Старое Село	в Старое Сяло	534	715
д Таборы	в Табары	81	121
аг Хатежино (Khatezhino)	аг Хацежына (Khatsyezhyna)	1019	2980
