= Novoselye =

Novoselye (Russian: Новоселье) is the name of several rural localities in Russia.

== Bryansk Oblast ==
As of 2010, two rural localities in Bryansk Oblast bear this name:

- Novoselye, Gordeyevsky District, Bryansk Oblast, a village in Strugovobudsky Selsoviet of Gordeyevsky District
- Novoselye, Zhukovsky District, Bryansk Oblast, a village in Zaborsko-Nikolsky Selsoviet of Zhukovsky District

== Kaluga Oblast ==
As of 2010, one rural locality in Kaluga Oblast bears this name:

- Novoselye, Kaluga Oblast, a village in Kozelsky District

== Leningrad Oblast ==
As of 2010, five rural localities in Leningrad Oblast bear this name:

- Novoselye, Lomonosovsky District, Leningrad Oblast, a logging depot settlement in Anninskoye Settlement Municipal Formation of Lomonosovsky District
- Novoselye, Osminskoye Settlement Municipal Formation, Luzhsky District, Leningrad Oblast, a village in Osminskoye Settlement Municipal Formation of Luzhsky District
- Novoselye, Serebryanskoye Settlement Municipal Formation, Luzhsky District, Leningrad Oblast, a village in Serebryanskoye Settlement Municipal Formation of Luzhsky District
- Novoselye, Volodarskoye Settlement Municipal Formation, Luzhsky District, Leningrad Oblast, a village in Volodarskoye Settlement Municipal Formation of Luzhsky District
- Novoselye, Slantsevsky District, Leningrad Oblast, a village in Novoselskoye Settlement Municipal Formation of Slantsevsky District

== Lipetsk Oblast ==
As of 2010, two rural localities in Lipetsk Oblast bear this name:

- Novoselye, Dobrovsky District, Lipetsk Oblast, a village in Zamartynovsky Selsoviet of Dobrovsky District
- Novoselye, Zadonsky District, Lipetsk Oblast, a village in Donskoy Selsoviet of Zadonsky District

== Nizhny Novgorod Oblast ==
As of 2010, two rural localities in Nizhny Novgorod Oblast bear this name:

- Novoselye, Semyonov, Nizhny Novgorod Oblast, a village in Khakhalsky Selsoviet of the city of oblast significance of Semyonov
- Novoselye, Knyagininsky District, Nizhny Novgorod Oblast, a village in Ananyevsky Selsoviet of Knyagininsky District

== Novgorod Oblast ==
As of 2010, three rural localities in Novgorod Oblast bear this name:

- Novoselye, Shimsky District, Novgorod Oblast, a village in Podgoshchskoye Settlement of Shimsky District
- Novoselye, Soletsky District, Novgorod Oblast, a village in Dubrovskoye Settlement of Soletsky District
- Novoselye, Starorussky District, Novgorod Oblast, a village in Zaluchskoye Settlement of Starorussky District

== Novosibirsk Oblast ==
As of 2010, two rural localities in Novosibirsk Oblast bear this name:

- Novoselye, Bolotninsky District, Novosibirsk Oblast, a village in Bolotninsky District
- Novoselye, Kupinsky District, Novosibirsk Oblast, a selo in Kupinsky District

== Omsk Oblast ==
As of 2010, one rural locality in Omsk Oblast bears this name:

- Novoselye, Omsk Oblast, a selo in Novoselsky Rural Okrug of Kormilovsky District

== Pskov Oblast ==
As of 2010, ten rural localities in Pskov Oblast bear this name:

- Novoselye, Gdovsky District, Pskov Oblast, a village in Gdovsky District
- Novoselye, Novosokolnichesky District, Pskov Oblast, a village in Novosokolnichesky District
- Novoselye, Opochetsky District, Pskov Oblast, a village in Opochetsky District
- Novoselye, Plyussky District, Pskov Oblast, a village in Plyussky District
- Novoselye, Pskovsky District, Pskov Oblast, a village in Pskovsky District
- Novoselye, Pytalovsky District, Pskov Oblast, a village in Pytalovsky District
- Novoselye, Sebezhsky District, Pskov Oblast, a village in Sebezhsky District
- Novoselye (selo), Strugo-Krasnensky District, Pskov Oblast, a selo in Strugo-Krasnensky District
- Novoselye (village), Strugo-Krasnensky District, Pskov Oblast, a village in Strugo-Krasnensky District
- Novoselye, Velikoluksky District, Pskov Oblast, a village in Velikoluksky District

== Saratov Oblast ==
As of 2010, one rural locality in Saratov Oblast bears this name:

- Novoselye, Saratov Oblast, a khutor in Alexandrovo-Gaysky District

== Smolensk Oblast ==
As of 2010, seven rural localities in Smolensk Oblast bear this name:

- Novoselye, Demidovsky District, Smolensk Oblast, a village in Shapovskoye Rural Settlement of Demidovsky District
- Novoselye, Dorogobuzhsky District, Smolensk Oblast, a village in Balakirevskoye Rural Settlement of Dorogobuzhsky District
- Novoselye, Monastyrshchinsky District, Smolensk Oblast, a village in Barsukovskoye Rural Settlement of Monastyrshchinsky District
- Novoselye, Shatalovskoye Rural Settlement, Pochinkovsky District, Smolensk Oblast, a village in Shatalovskoye Rural Settlement of Pochinkovsky District
- Novoselye, Vaskovskoye Rural Settlement, Pochinkovsky District, Smolensk Oblast, a village in Vaskovskoye Rural Settlement of Pochinkovsky District
- Novoselye, Smolensky District, Smolensk Oblast, a village in Khokhlovskoye Rural Settlement of Smolensky District
- Novoselye, Yelninsky District, Smolensk Oblast, a village in Mutishchenskoye Rural Settlement of Yelninsky District

== Tver Oblast ==
As of 2010, five rural localities in Tver Oblast bear this name:

- Novoselye (Okhvatskoye Rural Settlement), Penovsky District, Tver Oblast, a village in Penovsky District; municipally, a part of Okhvatskoye Rural Settlement of that district
- Novoselye (Voroshilovskoye Rural Settlement), Penovsky District, Tver Oblast, a village in Penovsky District; municipally, a part of Voroshilovskoye Rural Settlement of that district
- Novoselye, Sonkovsky District, Tver Oblast, a village in Sonkovsky District
- Novoselye, Staritsky District, Tver Oblast, a village in Staritsky District
- Novoselye, Udomelsky District, Tver Oblast, a village in Udomelsky District

== Yaroslavl Oblast ==
As of 2010, one rural locality in Yaroslavl Oblast bears this name:

- Novoselye, Yaroslavl Oblast, a selo in Veskovsky Rural Okrug of Pereslavsky District

== See also ==
- Navasyellye, Belarusian places named 'Novoselye' in Russian
