= Astrashytski Haradok rural council =

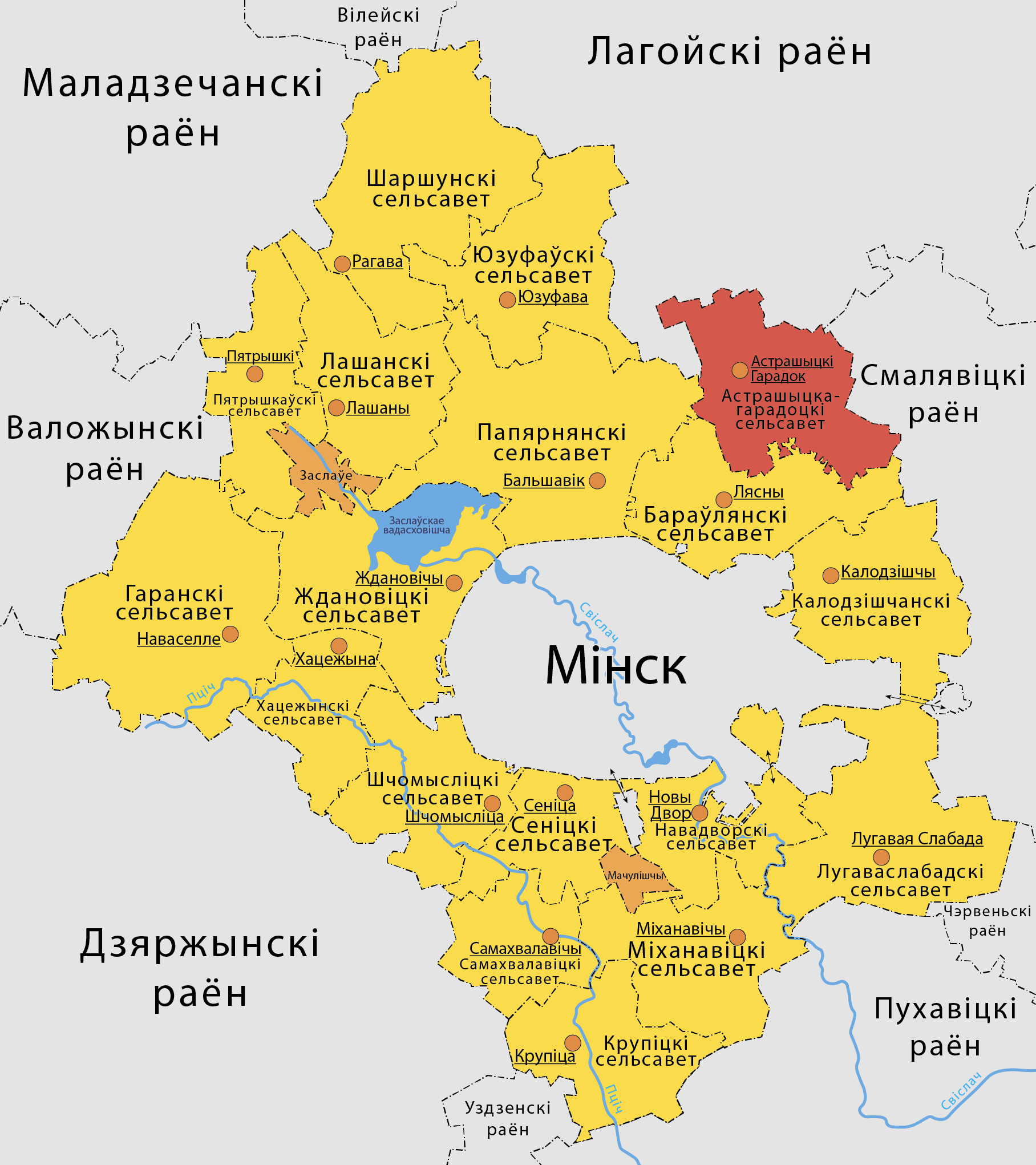
Map of Minsk District

Astrashytski Haradok rural council (Belarusian: Астрашыцкагарадоцкі сельсавет; Russian: Острошицко-Городокский сельсовет) is a lower-level subdivision (selsoviet) of Minsk district, Minsk region, Belarus. Its administrative center is the agrotown of Astrashytski Haradok.

== Rural localities ==
The populations are from the 2009 Belarusian census (5,730 total) and 2019 Belarusian census (7,031 total)

Russian name	Belarusian name	Pop. 2009	Pop. 2019
д Белые Лужи	в Белыя Лужы	18	14
д Бродок	в Брадок	250	252
д Буденного	в Будзённага	46	86
д Галица	в Галіца	35	76
д Губичи	в Губічы	46	100
д Ключники	в Ключнікі	19	26
д Крестиново	в Крыстынова	4	13
д Марьяливо	в Мар'яліва	340	622
д Мочулище	в Мачулішча	4	2
д Новоселки	в Навасёлкі	185	358
д Околица	в Аколіца	1940	1229
аг Острошицкий Городок	аг Астрашыцкі Гарадок	2302	3381
д Раубичи	в Раўбічы	218	551
д Селище	в Селішча	318	302
д Узборье	в Узбор'е	5	19
