= Lashany, Minsk district rural council =

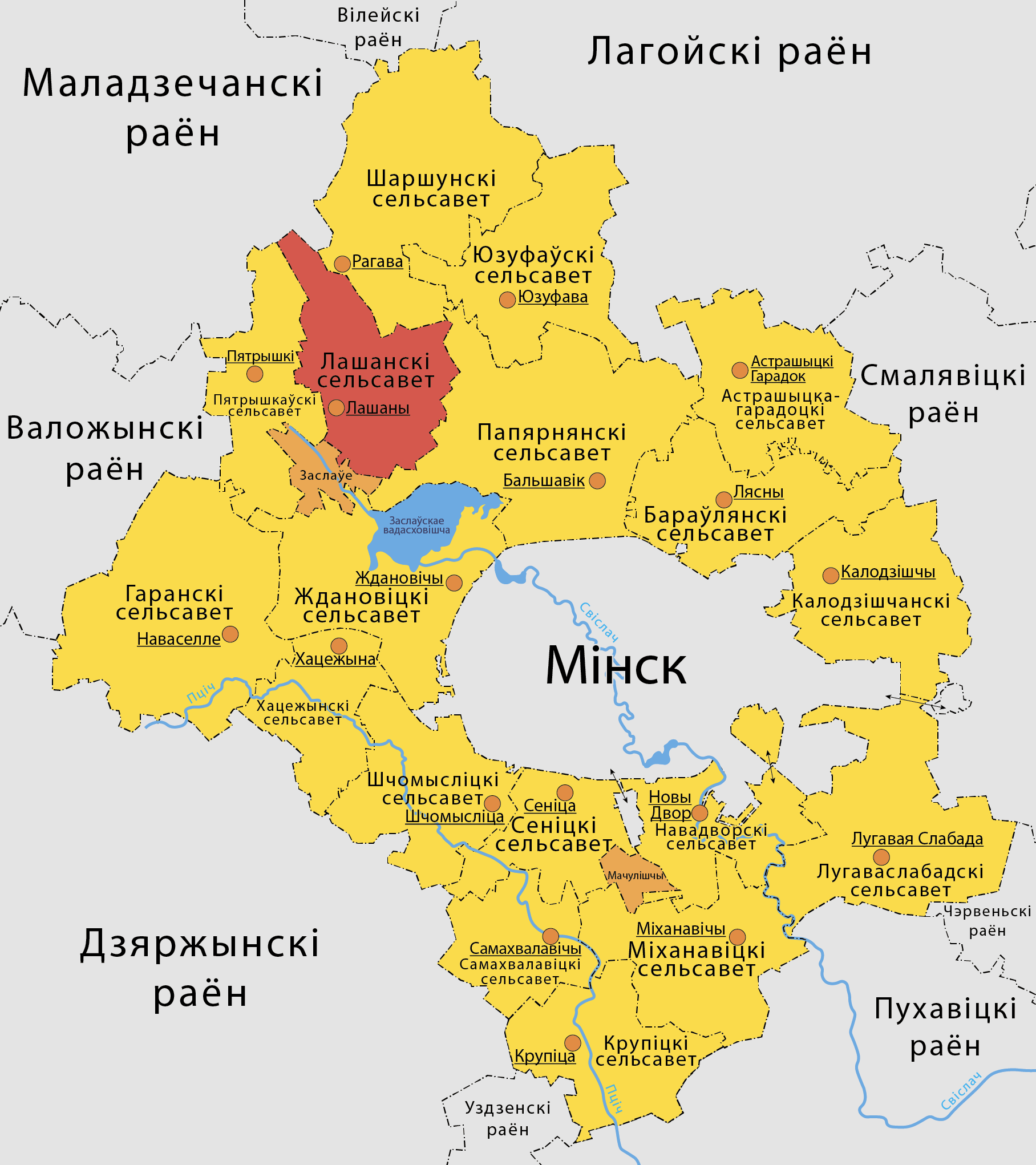
Map of Minsk District

Lashany rural council (Belarusian: Лашанскі сельсавет; Russian: Лошанский сельсовет) is a lower-level subdivision (selsoviet) of Minsk district, Minsk region, Belarus. Its administrative center is the agrotown of Lashany.

== Rural localities ==
The populations are from the 2009 Belarusian census (1,854 total) and 2019 Belarusian census (2,172 total)

Russian name	Belarusian name	Pop. 2009	Pop. 2019
д Агарки	в Агаркі	14	19
д Биньковцы	в Бінькаўцы	-	6
д Бовбли	в Боўблі	3	11
д Бровки	в Браўкі	455	603
д Вышково	в Вышкава	10	1
д Горошки	в Гарошкі	25	22
д Гуя	в Гуя	52	52
д Динаровичи	в Дзінаравічы	33	33
д Кальзберг	в Кальзберг	38	26
д Криницы	в Крыніцы	6	4
д Куты	в Куты	15	17
д Лабенщина	в Лабэншчына	17	36
п Ленина	п Леніна	8	-
д Лисицы	в Лісіцы	14	14
аг Лошаны (Loshany)	аг Лашаны (Lashany)	621	720
д Ломшино	в Ломшына	25	36
д Мацки	в Мацкі	14	11
п Новинка	п Навінка	125	172
д Прудище	в Прудзішча	30	62
д Путники	в Путнікі	99	87
д Рабушки	в Рабушкі	14	9
д Саёвщина	в Саёўшчына	20	20
п Селец	п Сялец	27	28
д Селец	в Сялец	34	21
д Селище	в Селішча	15	12
д Селявщина	в Сяляўшчына	5	9
д Слобода	в Слабада	50	62
д Суковичи	в Сукавічы	21	35
д Шимково	в Шымкава	8	12
д Щербины	в Шчарбіны	56	32
