= Harani, Minsk district rural council =

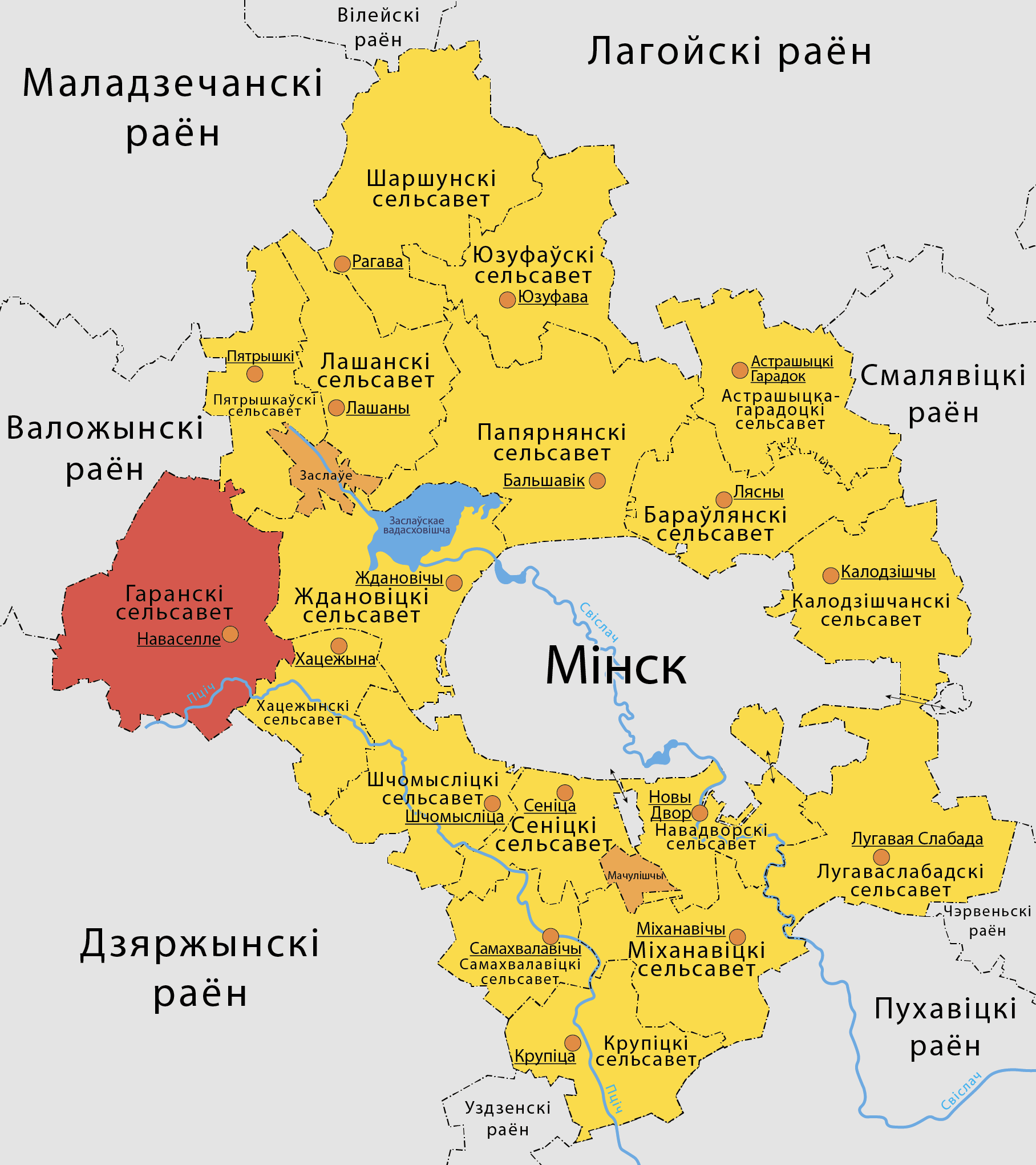
Map of Minsk District

Harani rural council (Belarusian: Гаранскі сельсавет; Russian: Горанский сельсовет) is a lower-level subdivision (selsoviet) of Minsk district, Minsk region, Belarus. Its administrative center is the agrotown of Navasyellye.

== Rural localities ==
The populations are from the 2009 Belarusian census (5,555 total) and 2019 Belarusian census (6210 total)

Russian name	Belarusian name	Pop. 2009	Pop. 2019
д Аксаковщина	в Аксакаўшчына	780	983
д Байдаки	в Байдакі	14	16
д Барсуки	в Барсукі	11	6
д Великая Борздынь	в Вялікая Барздынь	17	9
д Великое Село	в Вялікае Сяло	55	28
д Вишнёвка	в Вішнёўка	56	60
д Воловщина	в Валоўшчына	19	30
д Горани	в Гарані	126	137
д Дуброва	в Дуброва	14	25
д Дуличи	в Дулічы	178	141
д Жуки	в Жукі	19	9
д Закаблуки	в Закаблукі	47	135
п Звенячи	п Звінячы	51	57
д Звенячи	в Звінячы	31	40
д Ислочь	в Іслач	19	12
д Казаки	в Казакі	14	13
д Казельщина	в Казельшчына	24	10
д Капличи	в Каплічы	34	41
д Карасевщина	в Карасеўшчына	27	42
д Красное	в Краснае	15	14
д Крылово	в Крылава	97	94
д Лисовщина	в Лісаўшчына	13	12
д Лихачи	в Ліхачы	17	26
д Лукаши	в Лукашы	30	25
д Ляхи	в Ляхі	15	17
д Малая Борздынь	в Малая Барздынь	3	1
д Малявки	в Маляўкі	22	16
д Микулино	в Мікуліна	3	2
д Новодворщина	в Навадворшчына	4	1
п Новое Поле	п Новае Поле	1019	-
д Новое Поле	в Новае Поле	37	930
аг Новоселье (Novoselye)	аг Наваселле (Navasyellye)	1285	1590
д Падсады	в Падсады	20	10
д Рудаки	в Рудакі	23	19
д Селище	в Селішча	12	31
д Тейки	в Тэйкі	12	20
п Тресковщина	п Траскоўшчына	362	383
д Тресковщина	в Траскоўшчына	18	14
аг Чачково (Chackovo)	аг Чачкава (Chachkava)	1001	1187
д Черёмуха	в Чаромуха	11	24
