= Strochytsa =

Village in Minsk Region, Belarus

Stročytsa / Stročitsa Строчыца / Строчица
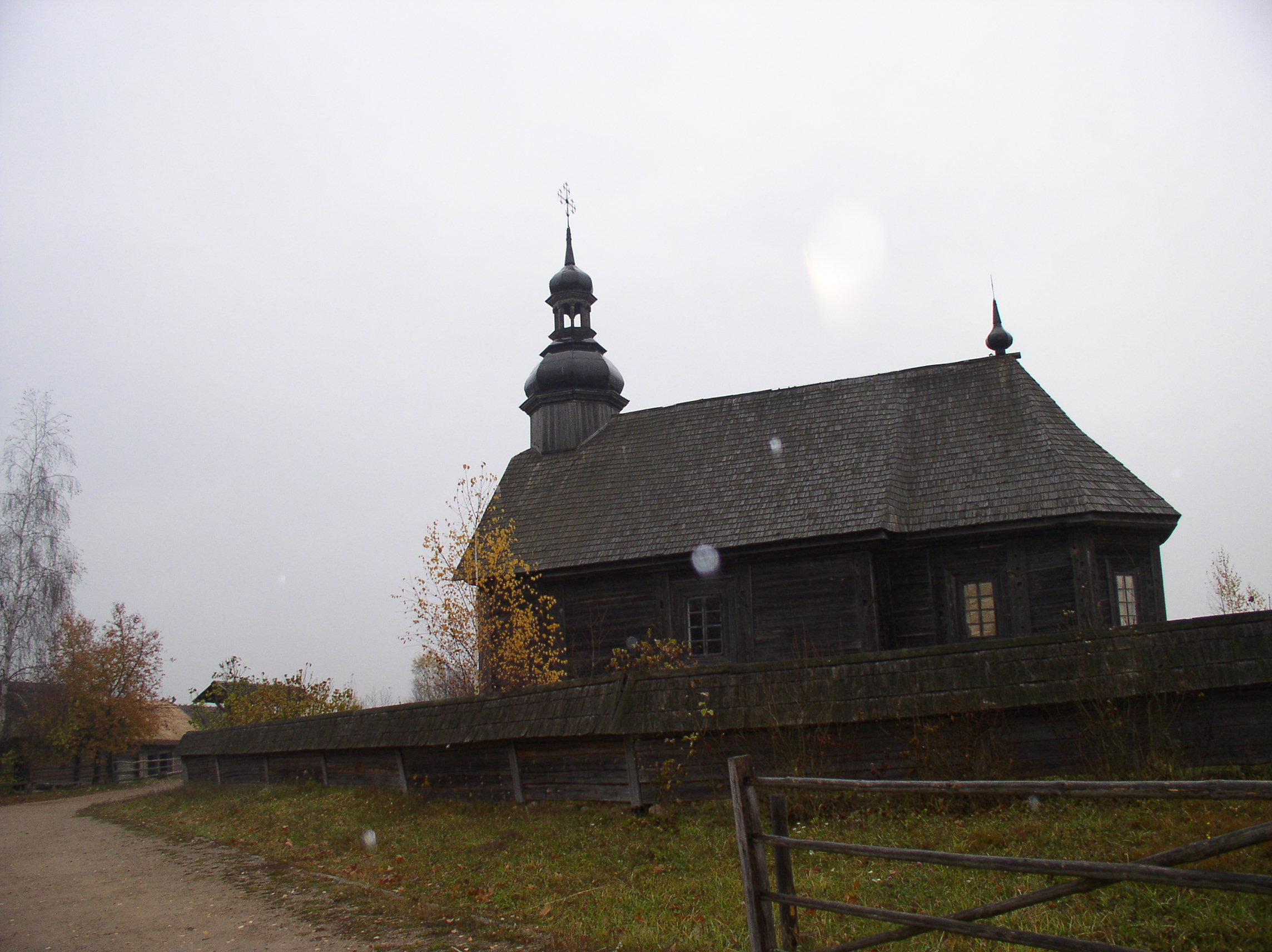
- The Church of Protection of Holy Virgin in the State Museum of Folk Architecture and Life

- Location within Belarus
- Coordinates: 53°49′10.89″N 27°21′54.12″E
- Country Voblast Raion: Belarus; Minsk Region; Minsk District
- Founded: ?
- Elevation: 280 m (920 ft)
- Time zone: UTC+2 (EET)
  - Summer (DST): UTC+3 (EEST)
- Postal code: 223021
- License plate: 5

Strochytsa (Belarusian: Строчыца, Strochytsa - Russian: Строчица), is a village in Minsk District, Minsk Region, Belarus. It is located by the river Ptsich and the Vowkavichy Reservoir (a.k.a. Ptsich Reservoir) on it.

In the 19th century it was called Strochytsy, Polish: Stroczyce.

== Vicinity ==
Northeast across Ptsich, between Strochytsa and Azyartso there is the Belarusian State Museum of Folk Architecture and Life, an open-air museum containing the original wooden Belarusian farmsteads, churches and household buildings.
