= Pyatryshki =

Agrotown in Minsk Region, Belarus

Pyatryshki Пятрышкі (Belarusian) Петришки (Russian)
- Agrotown
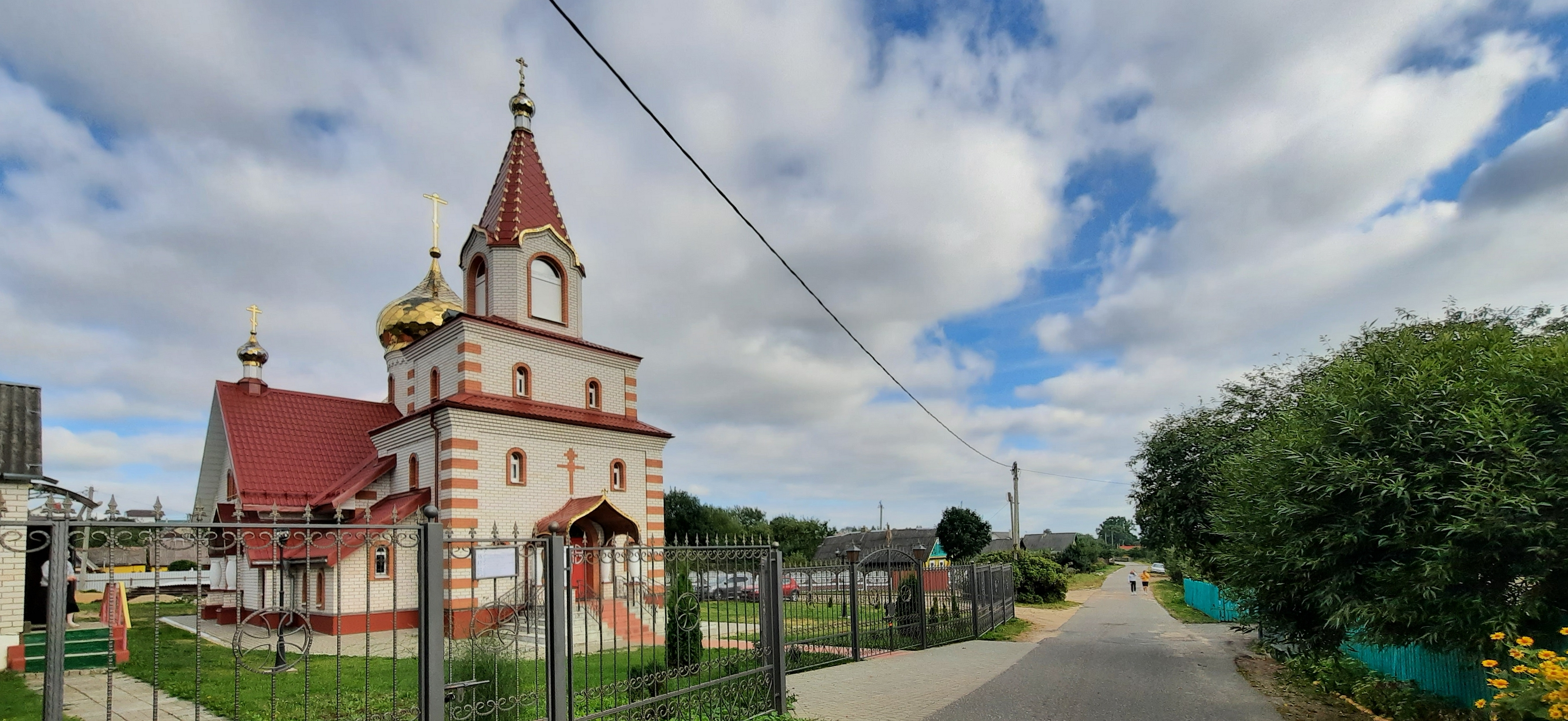

- Location within Belarus
- Coordinates: 54°04′14″N 27°13′06″E
- Country: Belarus
- Region: Minsk Region
- District: Minsk District

Population (2010)
  - Total: 2,005
- Time zone: UTC+3 (MSK)

Pyatryshki (Belarusian: Пятрышкі, romanized: Piatryški; Russian: Петришки, romanized: Petrishki) is an agrotown in Minsk District, Minsk Region, Belarus. It serves as the administrative center of Pyatryshki selsoviet. It is located about 24 kilometres (15 mi) northwest of the capital Minsk. In 2001, it had a population of 1,844. In 2010, it had a population of 2,005.

== History ==
Before World War II, Pyatryshki was a border town in the Byelorussian SSR, in the Soviet Union. A border station was located just outside of Pyatryshki. The border between the Second Polish Republic and the Soviet Union was very close to Pyatryshki.
