= Minsk district =

District of Minsk region, Belarus

Minsk District Мінскі раён (Belarusian) Минский район (Russian)
- District
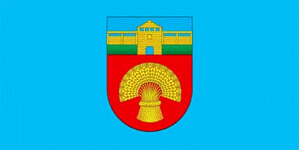
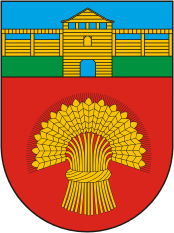
- Flag Coat of arms

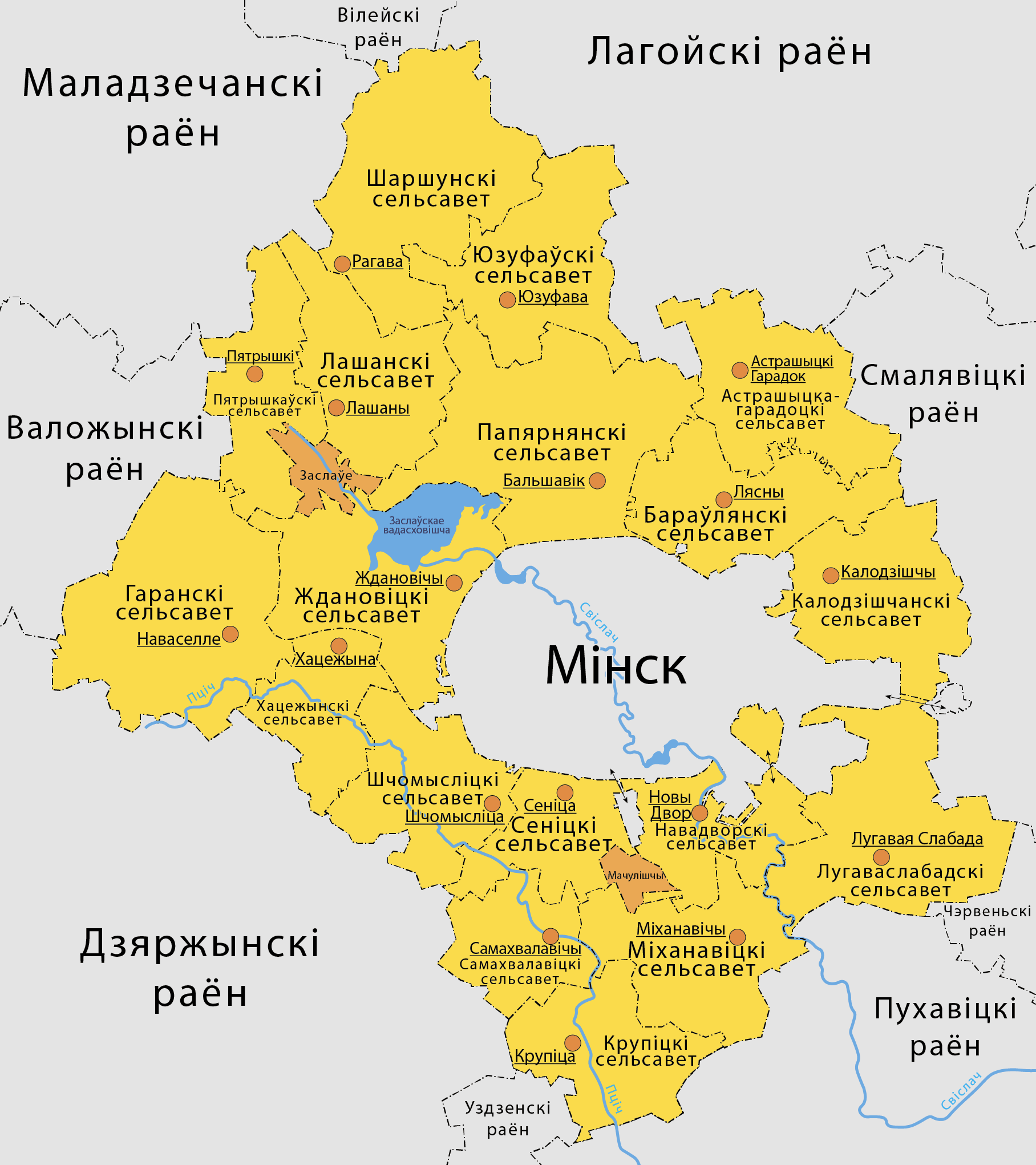
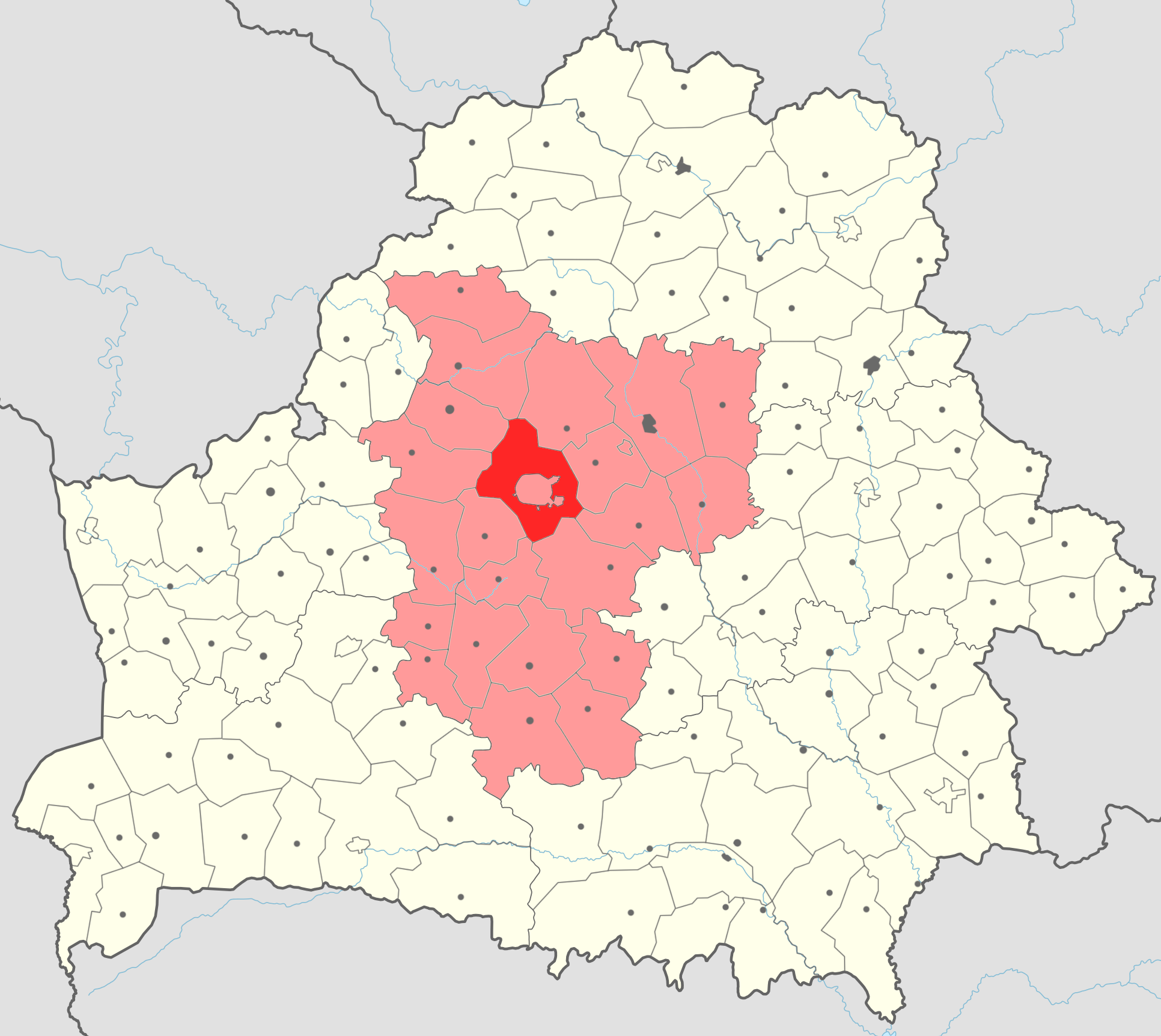
- Coordinates (Minsk): 53°54′N 27°34′E
- Country: Belarus
- Region: Minsk region
- Administrative center: Minsk
- Municipalities: Total: 36 + Minsk

Area
  - Total: 1,943 km^{2} (750 sq mi)

Population (2024)
  - Total: 274,990
  - Density: 141.5/km^{2} (366.6/sq mi)
  - Urban: 27,987
  - Rural: 247,003
- Time zone: UTC+3 (MSK)
- Website: Official website

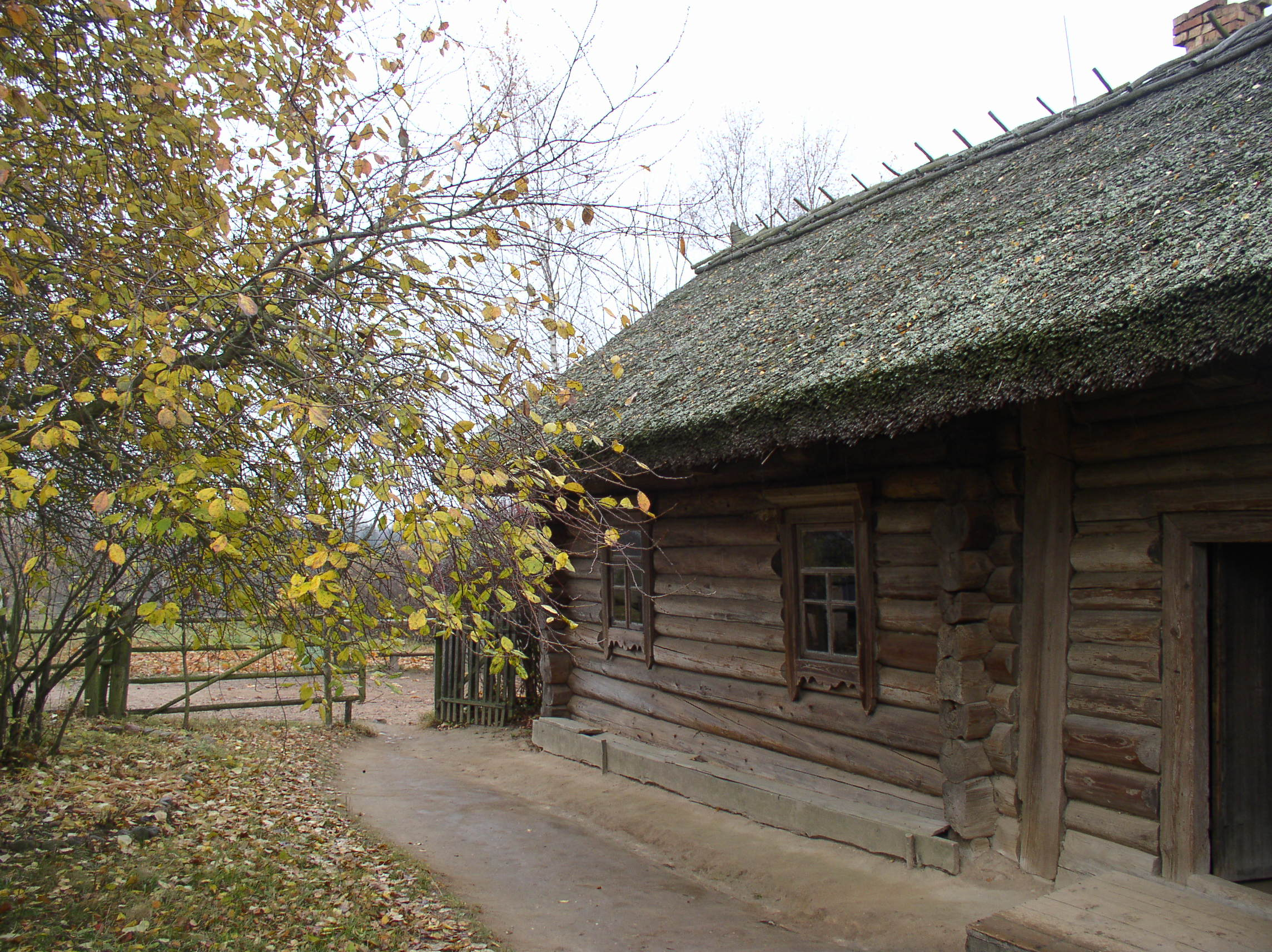
A house in the Belarusian State Museum of Folk Architecture and Life, Strochitsy

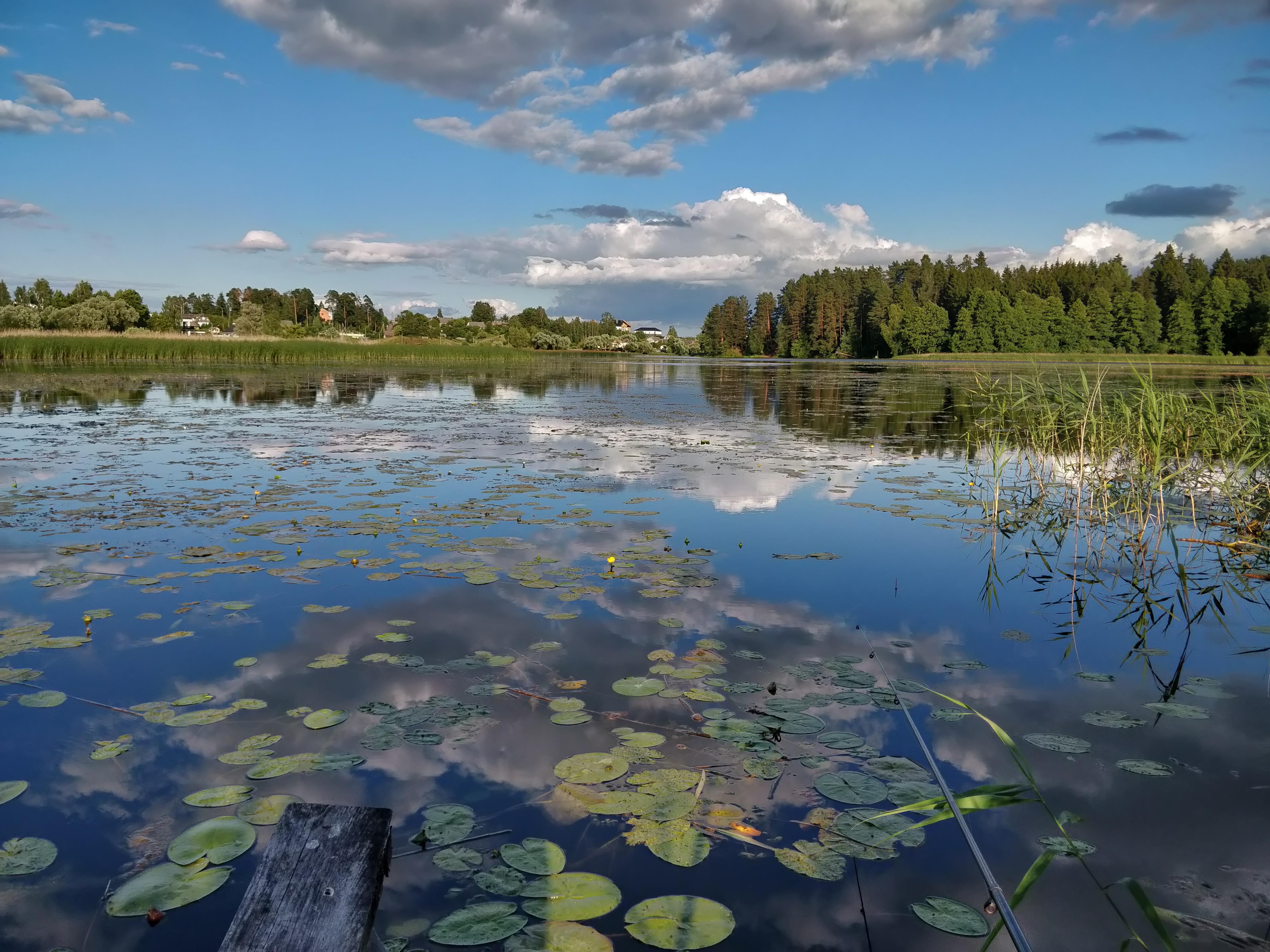
Ostroshitski Gorodok pond

Minsk district (Belarusian: Мінскі раён; Russian: Минский район) is a district (raion) of Belarus in Minsk region. The administrative center is the capital Minsk, which is administratively separated from the district and region. As of 2024, it has a population of 274,990. The most populous town in the district is Zaslawye.

== Geography ==
The district is situated both in the middle of Minsk region and of the Belarus. It is crossed by the Svislach River and the towns around Minsk are part of its metropolitan area.

It borders, from north to south in a clockwise sense, with the districts of Vileyka, Lahoysk, Smalyavichy, Chervyen, Pukhavichy, Uzda, Dzyarzhynsk, Valozhyn and Maladzyechna.

== Administrative divisions ==
Minsk, being the capital of Belarus has a special administrative status and is not subordinated to Minsk district. The district includes two other urban populated places: the town of Zaslawye and the urban-type settlement of Machulishchy. The rural area is subdivided into rural councils (selsoviets). Belarus has settlements of special type, with elements of urban infrastructure, called agrotowns. Despite the name, they have no status of town and subordinated to rural councils. Most of them are administrative centers of rural councils.

The subdivision into rural councils changed over time. As of 2025, the 18 rural councils are: Astrashytski Haradok rural council, Barawlyany rural council, Harani rural council, Kalodzishchy rural council, Khatsyezhyna rural council, Krupitsa rural council, Lashany rural council, Luhavaya Slabada rural council, Mikhanavichy rural council, Novy Dvor rural council, Papiernya rural council, Pyatryshki rural council, Samakhvalavichy rural council, Syenitsa rural council, Sharshuny rural council, Shchomyslitsa rural council, Yuzufova rural council, Zhdanovichy rural council.

See be:Катэгорыя:Былыя сельсаветы Мінскага раёна for former rural councils of Minsk district.

== Notable residents ==
- Yan Matusevich (1946, Komenka village – 1998), first dean of the modern Belarusian Greek Catholic Church
- Ernst Sabila (1932, Dzehciaroŭka village – 2022), Belarusian Protestant religious leader, dissident and Gulag survivor
- Mikhail Puteiko (1913, Revkutyevichi village – 1945), Red Army general during World War II killed at the Battle of Bautzen
- Aleh Sukonka (born 1951), honorary resident, Belarusian public figure, professor of medical sciences

== See also ==
- Minsk Automobile Ring Road
- List of historical and cultural heritage of the Minsk district
