= Aktsyabr =

Aktsyabr (Belarusian: Акцябр, romanized: Akciabr; Russian: Октябрь, romanized: Oktyabr, lit. 'October') may refer to the following places in Belarus:

- Aktsyabr, Asipovichy District, a village in Asipovichy District, Mogilev Region
- Aktsyabr, Babruysk District, a village in Babruysk District, Mogilev Region
- Aktsyabr, Buda-Kashalyova District, a village in Buda-Kashalyova District, Gomel Region
- Aktsyabr, Chachersk District, a village in Chachersk District, Gomel Region
- Aktsyabr, Kobryn District, a village in Kobryn District, Brest Region
- Aktsyabr, Lahoysk District, an agrotown in Lahoysk District, Minsk Region
- Aktsyabr, Rechytsa District, a village in Rechytsa District, Gomel Regio
- Aktsyabr, Salihorsk District, a village in Salihorsk District, Minsk Region
- Aktsyabr, Slutsk District, a village in Slutsk District, Minsk Region
- Aktsyabr, Zhlobin District, a village in Zhlobin District, Gomel Region
