= Rachen =

Agrotown in Minsk Region, Belarus

Rachen Рачэнь (Belarusian) Речень (Russian)
- Agrotown
- Location within Belarus
- Coordinates: 52°44′46″N 27°50′30″E
- Country: Belarus
- Region: Minsk Region
- District: Lyuban District

Population (2011)
  - Total: 693
- Time zone: UTC+3 (MSK)

Rachen (Belarusian: Рачэнь, romanized: Račeń; Russian: Речень, romanized: Rechen) is an agrotown in Lyuban District, Minsk Region, Belarus. It serves as the administrative center of Rachen selsoviet. It is located 15 kilometres (9.3 mi) from Lyuban, 40 kilometres (25 mi) from Urechcha, and 197 kilometres (122 mi) from the capital Minsk. In 2011, it had a population of 693.
