= Dashkawka =

Dashkawka (Belarusian: Дашкаўка) or Dashkovka (Russian: Дашковка) may refer to the following places in Belarus:

- Dashkawka, Vileyka District, a village in Vileyka District, Minsk Region
- Dashkawka, Mogilev District, an agrotown in Mogilev District, Mogilev Region
- Dashkawka, Slawharad District, a former village in Slawharad District, Mogilev Region
