= Sosny, Kamuna selsoviet, Lyuban district =

Agrotown in Minsk Region, Belarus

Sosny Сосны
- Agrotown
- Location within Belarus
- Coordinates: 52°35′08″N 27°59′02″E
- Country: Belarus
- Region: Minsk Region
- District: Lyuban District

Population (2011)
  - Total: 1,074
- Time zone: UTC+3 (MSK)

Sosny (Belarusian: Сосны; Russian: Сосны) is an agrotown in Lyuban District, Minsk Region, Belarus. It serves as the administrative center of Kamuna selsoviet. It is located 25 kilometres (16 mi) from Lyuban, 55 kilometres (34 mi) from Urechcha, and 187 kilometres (116 mi) from the capital Minsk. In 2011, it had a population of 1,074.
