= Asavyets, Asavyets selsoviet, Lyuban district =

Agrotown in Minsk Region, Belarus

Asavyets Асавец (Belarusian) Осовец (Russian)
- Agrotown
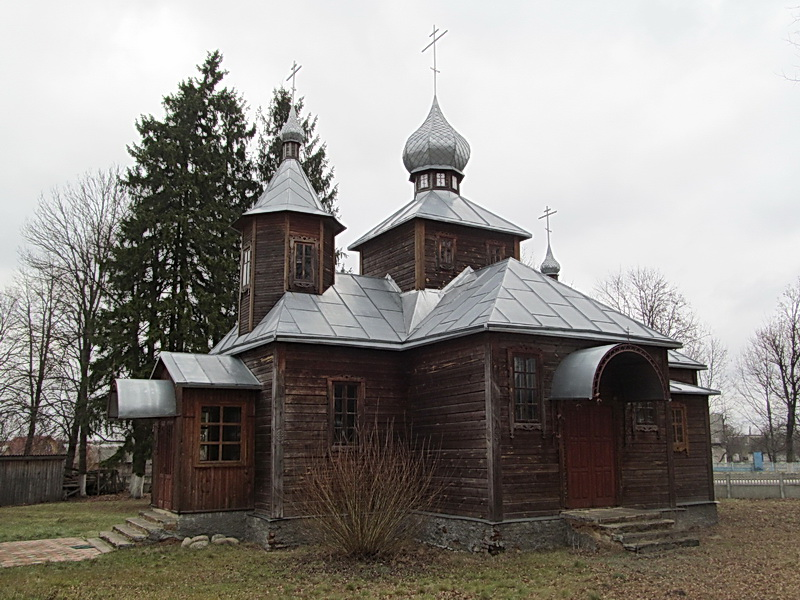

- Location within Belarus
- Coordinates: 52°51′10″N 28°11′27″E
- Country: Belarus
- Region: Minsk Region
- District: Lyuban District

Population (2011)
  - Total: 950
- Time zone: UTC+3 (MSK)

Asavyets (Belarusian: Асавец, romanized: Asaviec; Russian: Осовец, romanized: Osovets) is an agrotown in Lyuban District, Minsk Region, Belarus. It serves as the administrative center of Asavyets selsoviet. It is located 17 kilometres (11 mi) from Lyuban, 42 kilometres (26 mi) from Urechcha, and 168 kilometres (104 mi) from the capital Minsk. In 1994, it had a population of 1,197. In 2011, it had a population of 950.
