= Kosovka =

Kosovka may refer to:

- Kosovka, Minsk Voblast, a town in Belarus
- Kosivka, Kirovohrad Oblast, a village in Ukraine
- Kosivka, Odesa Oblast, a village in Ukraine
- Kosovka (river), Krasnoyarsk Krai, Russia
- Kosovka devojka, a Serbian heroine, see Kosovo Maiden
