= Aboltsy =

Agrotown in Vitebsk Region, Belarus

Aboltsy Абольцы (Belarusian) Обольцы (Russian)
- Agrotown
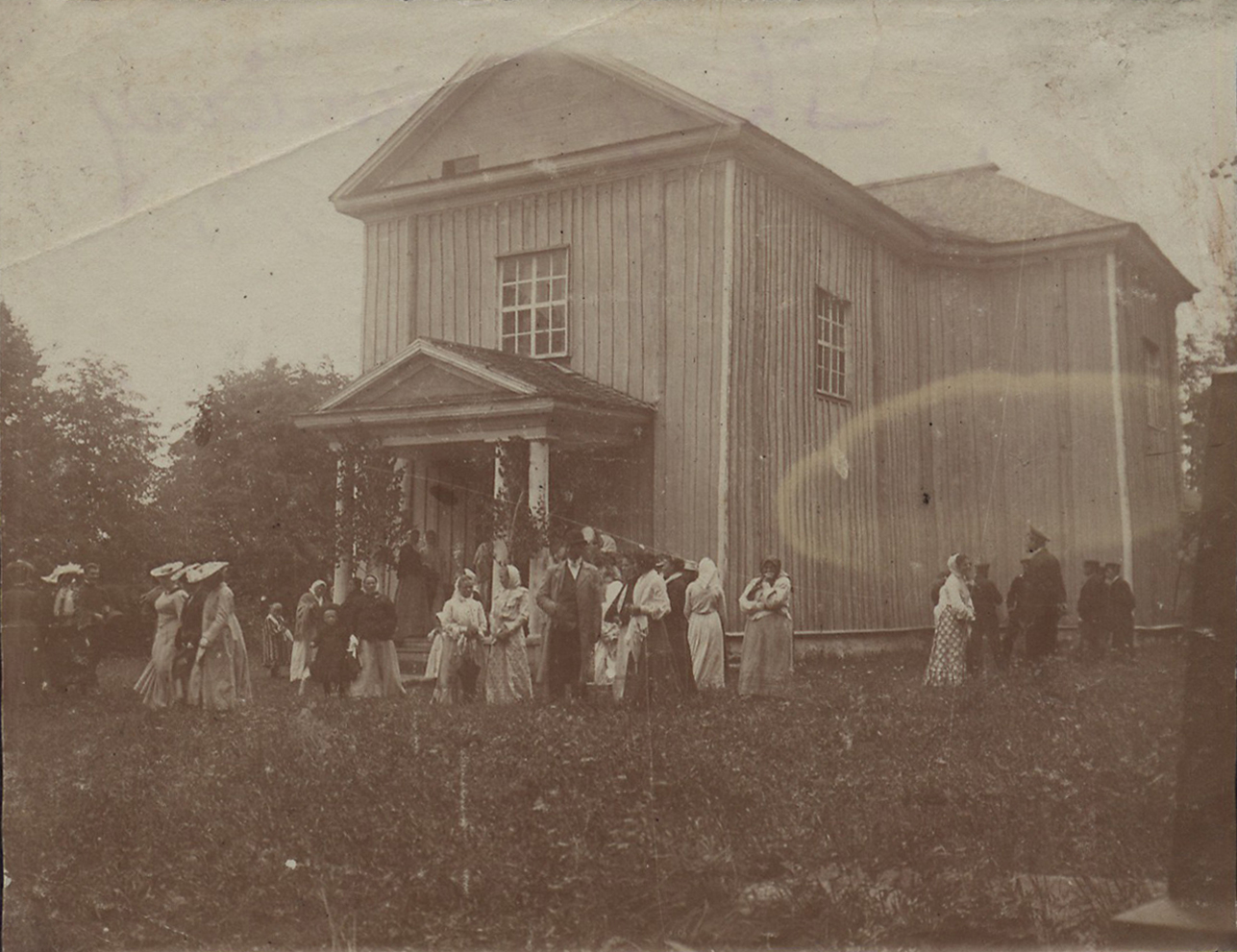

- Location within Belarus
- Coordinates: 54°35′40″N 29°49′44″E
- Country: Belarus
- Region: Minsk Region
- District: Talachyn District
- First mentioned: 1385

Population (1994)
  - Total: 450
- Time zone: UTC+3 (MSK)

Aboltsy (Belarusian: Абольцы, romanized: Aboĺcy; Russian: Обольцы, romanized: Oboltsy) is an agrotown in Talachyn District, Vitebsk Region, Belarus. It is located 40 kilometres (25 mi) west-northwest of Orsha. It serves as the administrative center of Aboltsy selsoviet. In 1994, it had a population of 450.

== History ==
Aboltsy is first mentioned in 1385 under the name Obolchi (Оболчи) as belonging to the Grand Duchy of Lithuania in the List of Russian Cities, Far and Near. In the 15th and early 16th century, it was the center of a powiat within the land of Vitebsk. Following the administrative reforms of 1565–1566, it belonged to the county of Orsha within Vitebsk Voivodeship.

Following its incorporation into the Russian Empire, Aboltsy had a population of 265 in 1885.

In 1923, there were 353 Jews living there out of a total population of 382.

=== World War II ===
During World War II, it was under German military occupation from early July 1941 until June 1944.

The Germans established a ghetto on 14 August 1941 and about 150 people or 25 families were placed in two single-story buildings of a local school. On 5 March 1942, news of the mass murder of Jews in Smalyany reached the ghetto, and at midnight, 60 Jews escaped from the school according to survivors' accounts. The number of escapees may be an exaggeration, but it is known that a number of young Jews from the village later fought for partisan units such as the Zaslonov brigade. The ghetto was liquated on 4 June and approximately 100 Jews were shot.

== Geography ==
Aboltsy is situated 36 kilometres (22 mi) from Talachyn, 116 kilometres (72 mi) from Vitebsk, and nine kilometres (5.6 mi) from the station Lyemnitsa.

== Sources ==
- Беларуская энцыклапедыя: У 18 т. Т. 1: А — Аршын. Minsk: Беларуская энцыклапедыя. 1996. p. 32. ISBN 985-11-0036-6.
- Megargee, Geoffrey P.; Dean, Martin (2012). The United States Holocaust Memorial Museum Encyclopedia of Camps and Ghettos 1933–1945. Volume II. Indiana University Press, United States Holocaust Memorial Museum. p. 1709. ISBN 978-0-253-35599-7.
