= Azyartso =

Azyartso may refer to:

- Azyartso, Brest Region, a village in Ivatsevichy District, Brest Region, Belarus
- Azyartso, Minsk Region, an agrotown in Minsk District, Minsk Region, Belarus
