= Markava, Maladzyechna district =

Agrotown in Minsk Region, Belarus

Markava Маркава (Belarusian) Марково (Russian)
- Agrotown
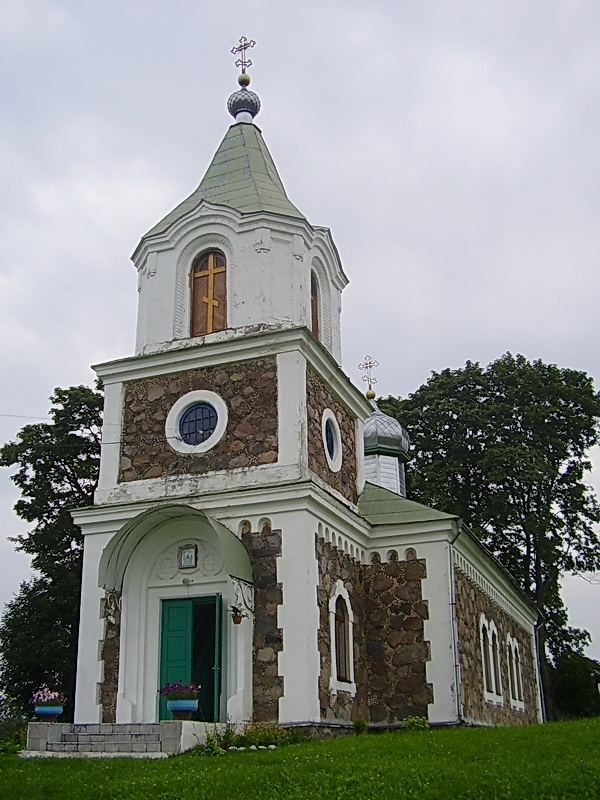

- Location within Belarus
- Coordinates: 54°19′57″N 26°35′51″E
- Country: Belarus
- Region: Minsk Region
- District: Maladzyechna District

Population (2010)
  - Total: 698
- Time zone: UTC+3 (MSK)

Markava (Belarusian: Маркава; Russian: Марково, romanized: Markovo) is an agrotown in Maladzyechna District, Minsk Region, Belarus. It serves as the administrative center of Markava selsoviet. It is located 19 kilometres (12 mi) from Maladzyechna and 97 kilometres (60 mi) from the capital Minsk. In 1999, it had a population of 772. In 2010, it had a population of 698.

== History ==
In the interbellum, Marków, as it was known in Polish, was first administratively located in the Nowogródek Voivodeship of Poland until 1922, and then the Wilno Voivodeship.

Following the invasion of Poland in September 1939, Marków was first occupied by the Soviet Union until 1941, then by Nazi Germany until 1944. On 24 June 1942, a detachment of 'security police' from Wilejka, accompanied by a platoon of Waffen-SS and local auxiliary police, executed at least 500 Jews near the village of Markow, following a forced march from the ghetto in Lebiedziew. In 1944, the settlement was re-occupied by the Soviet Union, which eventually annexed it from Poland in 1945.
