= Sarachy =

Agrotown in Minsk Region, Belarus

Sarachy Сарачы (Belarusian) Сорочи (Russian)
- Agrotown
- Location within Belarus
- Coordinates: 52°47′10″N 28°01′07″E
- Country: Belarus
- Region: Minsk Region
- District: Lyuban District

Population (2011)
  - Total: 1,271
- Time zone: UTC+3 (MSK)

Sarachy (Belarusian: Сарачы, romanized: Saračy; Russian: Сорочи, romanized: Sorochi) is an agrotown in Lyuban District, Minsk Region, Belarus. It serves as the administrative center of Sarachy selsoviet. It is located one kilometre (0.62 mi) from Lyuban, 26 kilometres (16 mi) from Urechcha, and 153 kilometres (95 mi) from the capital Minsk. In 2001, it had a population of 1,432. In 2011, it had a population of 1,271.
