= Svatki =

Agrotown in Minsk Region, Belarus

Svatki Сваткі (Belarusian) Сватки (Russian)
- Agrotown
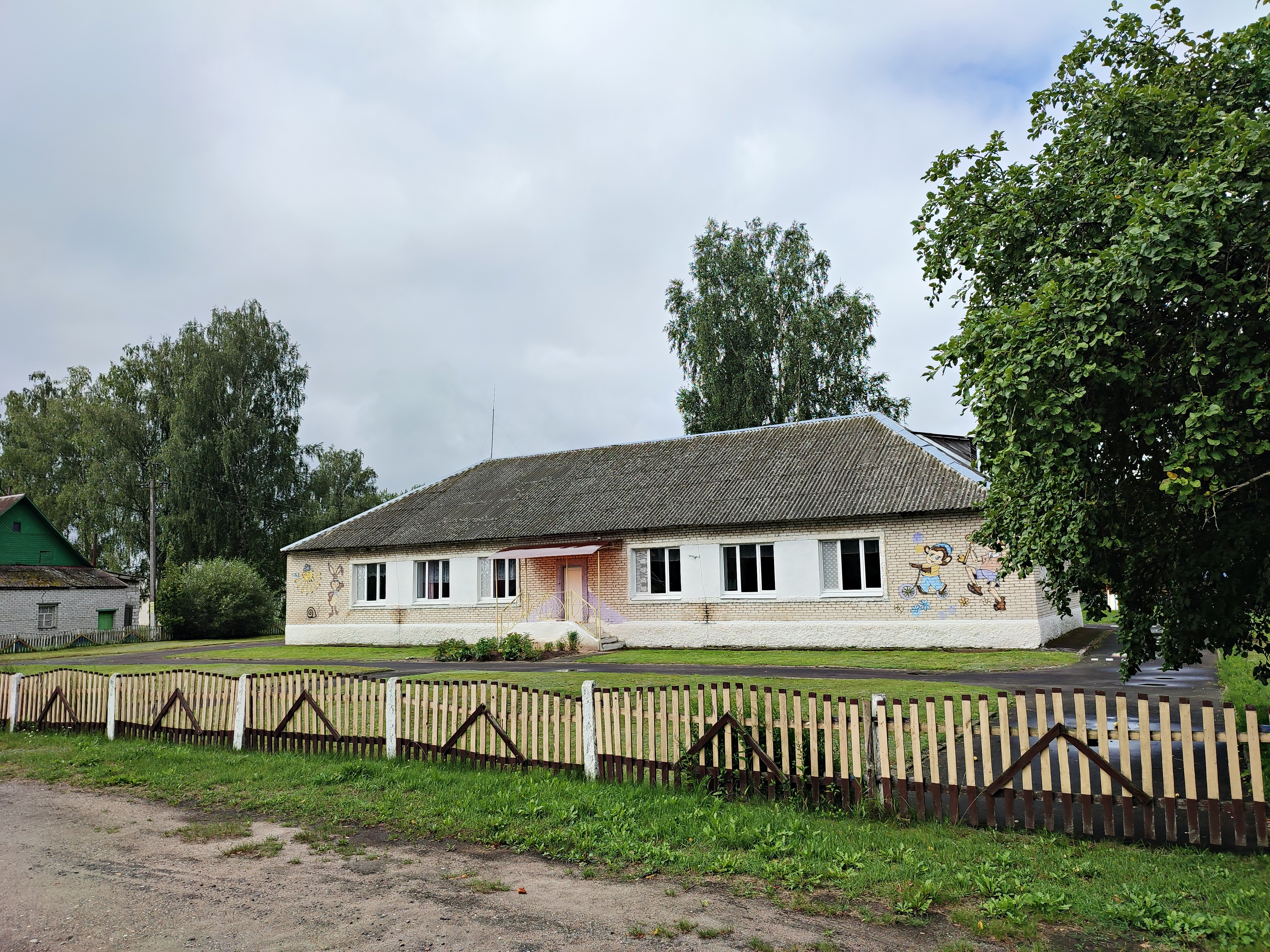

- Location within Belarus
- Coordinates: 54°45′32″N 27°05′04″E
- Country: Belarus
- Region: Minsk Region
- District: Myadzyel District

Population (2011)
  - Total: 516
- Time zone: UTC+3 (MSK)

Svatki (Belarusian: Сваткі; Russian: Сватки) is an agrotown in Myadzyel District, Minsk Region, Belarus. It serves as the administrative center of Svatki selsoviet. It is located 18 kilometres (11 mi) from Myadzyel, 10 kilometres (6.2 mi) from Knyahinin, and 110 kilometres (68 mi) from the capital Minsk. It is located by the Wuzlianka river, a tributary of the Narach. In 2011, it had a population of 516.

== Demographics ==
Population:

- 2001 – 564
- 2011 – 516

== Notable residents ==
Belarusian poet Maksim Tank attended a school in Svatki. There is Tank's museum at the school.
