= Viktor Dubovyk =

Ukrainian lawyer and politician

Head of the Directorate for Legal Policy of the Office of the President of Ukraine
- In office 2024–present
- President: Volodymyr Zelenskyy

Head of the Office for Counteracting Raiding, Ministry of Justice of Ukraine
- In office 2020–2024
- President: Volodymyr Zelenskyy

Personal details
- Born: December 10, 1989 (age 36) Urechcha, Lyuban District, Minsk Region, Byelorussian SSR
- Education: Donetsk National University (named after Vasyl Stus)
- Profession: lawyer, jurist, politician

Viktor Viktorovych Dubovyk (Ukrainian: Віктор Вікторович Дубовик; born December 10, 1989 in Urechcha, Minsk Region, Byelorussian SSR) is a Ukrainian lawyer, jurist and politician. Since May 2024, he has been serving as Director General of the Directorate for Legal Policy in the Office of the President of Ukraine. Previously, he headed the Office for Counteracting Raiding at the Ministry of Justice of Ukraine.

== Biography ==
=== Education ===
Dubovyk graduated from the Donetsk National University with a degree in law and later from the National Academy for Public Administration under the President of Ukraine with a specialization in Economic Policy.

=== Career ===
In 2011, Dubovyk began his legal practice, focusing on legal support for businesses and protection against illegal takeovers and raiding. During this period, he worked as a legal advisor and later as director of the company Viva Lex.

In 2012, he ran for the Verkhovna Rada as part of the Green Planet party list, in 13th position, but was not elected.

From 2013 to 2014, Dubovyk served as an advisor to the First Vice Prime Minister of Ukraine.

In 2015, he ran for the Mykolaiv Regional Council under the party "Batkivshchyna", holding 14th position on the list, but was not elected.

From 2016 to 2020, he was a partner at the law firm "Volkhv" and headed the practice in business protection.

In 2019, he obtained a license to practice law.

=== Activity in the Ministry of Justice of Ukraine ===
In 2020, Dubovyk held the position of Head of the Department for Review of Applications and Complaints in the field of state registration at the Notary and State Registration Department.

From September 18, 2020 to April 18, 2024, Viktor Dubovyk headed the Office for Counteracting Raiding at the Ministry of Justice of Ukraine. During this period, he initiated a number of reforms aimed at strengthening the protection of property rights and countering illegal property seizures. In particular, the number of unauthorized interventions in state registries was reduced to zero, the complaint review process was streamlined, and the registration system was secured during martial law.

=== Activity in the Office of the President of Ukraine ===
In April 2024, Viktor Dubovyk was appointed Director General of the Directorate for Legal Policy in the Office of the President of Ukraine. In this role, he develops the President’s legal initiatives and coordinates the country’s legal system.

=== Corruption charges ===
In August 2026 during operations "Themis" and "Forrest Gump" by National Anti-Corruption Bureau of Ukraine it turned out that Dubovyk was part of a wide ring of top officials involved in multiple corruption, raider attacks and bribery schemes as well as unlawful influence on the courts. On August 26, 2026, Viktor Dubovyk was released from custody after posting 7 million hryvnia bail.

== Social activities ==
Following the full-scale Russian invasion of Ukraine in 2022, Viktor Dubovyk has been actively engaged in communicating with the business community about the specifics of raider attacks during martial law and measures to prevent them. In 2023, he was a candidate for the position of Head of the Asset Recovery and Management Agency but was not selected by the competitive commission.

In 2025, Dubovyk participated in the selection process for the position of Director of the Bureau of Economic Security of Ukraine. During the competition, he publicly raised concerns about systematic violations of openness and transparency by the selection commission.

== Recognition ==
- Honorary Diploma of the Cabinet of Ministers of Ukraine (2020) — for significant contributions to the development of legal policy and combating raiding.
- Award of the Ministry of Justice of Ukraine (2021) — for professionalism and effective leadership of the Anti-Raider Office.
- Medal “For Assistance to the Armed Forces of Ukraine” (2022).
- Medal “For Assistance to Military Intelligence of Ukraine,” 2nd Class, awarded by the Main Directorate of Intelligence of the Ministry of Defence of Ukraine (2022).
- Honoured Lawyer of Ukraine (2026).
