= Volya =

Volya may refer to:

- Pavel Volya (born 1979), Russian television host, actor, and singer
- Volya, from 1917–1918, name of the Russian battleship Imperator Aleksandr III, Imperatritsa Mariya-class dreadnought of the Imperial Russian Navy
- Volya (Russian political party), a political party in Russia with a candidate in the 2013 Moscow mayoral election
- Agrotown Volya, Brest Voblast, Belarus
- Volya (Bulgarian political party), political party in Bulgaria run by Veselin Mareshki
- Volya (Ukrainian political party), political party in Ukraine
- Bluzhev-Volya, a branch of the Bluzhev Hasidic group

== See also ==
- Narodnaya Volya (disambiguation)
- Volia, an extinct crocodylian
- Wola (settlement), or Volia, a type of agricultural village in the Polish-Lithuanian Commonwealth
