= Tal, Minsk region =

Agrotown in Minsk Region, Belarus

Tal Таль
- Agrotown
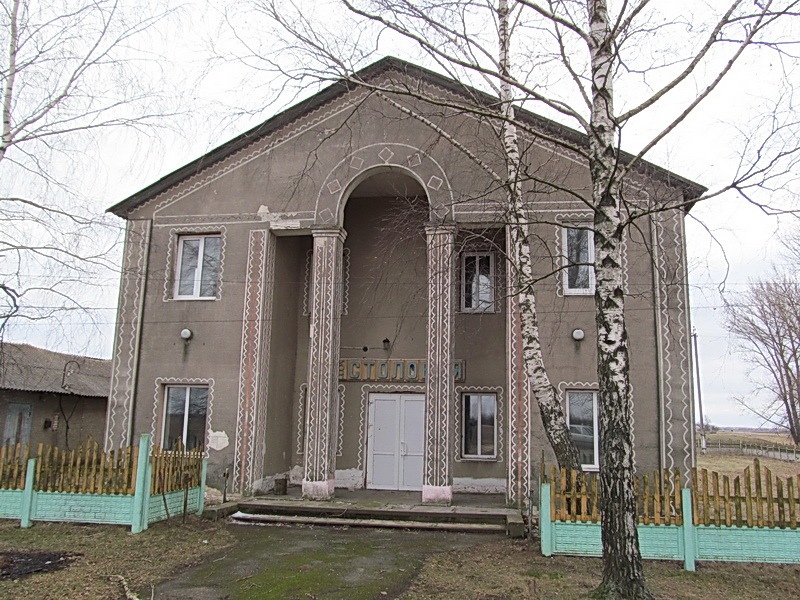

- Location within Belarus
- Coordinates: 52°51′20″N 27°57′20″E
- Country: Belarus
- Region: Minsk Region
- District: Lyuban District

Population (2011)
  - Total: 1,095
- Time zone: UTC+3 (MSK)

Tal (Belarusian: Таль, romanized: Taĺ; Russian: Таль) is an agrotown in Lyuban District, Minsk Region, Belarus. It serves as the administrative center of Tal selsoviet. It is located eight kilometres (5.0 mi) from Lyuban, 17 kilometres (11 mi) from Urechcha, and 144 kilometres (89 mi) from the capital Minsk. In 2002, it had a population of 1,395. In 2011, it had a population of 1,095.
