= Malyya Haradzyatsichy =

Agrotown in Minsk Region, Belarus

Malyya Haradzyatsichy Малыя Гарадзяцічы (Belarusian) Малые Городятичи (Russian)
- Agrotown
- Location within Belarus
- Coordinates: 52°32′43″N 28°19′27″E
- Country: Belarus
- Region: Minsk Region
- District: Lyuban District

Population (2011)
  - Total: 631
- Time zone: UTC+3 (MSK)

Malyya Haradzyatsichy (Belarusian: Малыя Гарадзяцічы, romanized: Malyja Haradziacičy; Russian: Малые Городятичи, romanized: Malyye Gorodyatichi) is an agrotown in Lyuban District, Minsk Region, Belarus. It serves as the administrative center of Malyya Haradzyatsichy selsoviet. It is located 42 kilometres (26 mi) from Lyuban, 67 kilometres (42 mi) from Urechcha, and 194 kilometres (121 mi) from the capital Minsk. In 1999, it had a population of 798. In 2011, it had a population of 631.
