= Haradok, Maladzyechna district =

Agrotown in Minsk Region, Belarus

Haradok Гарадок (Belarusian) Городок (Russian)
- Agrotown
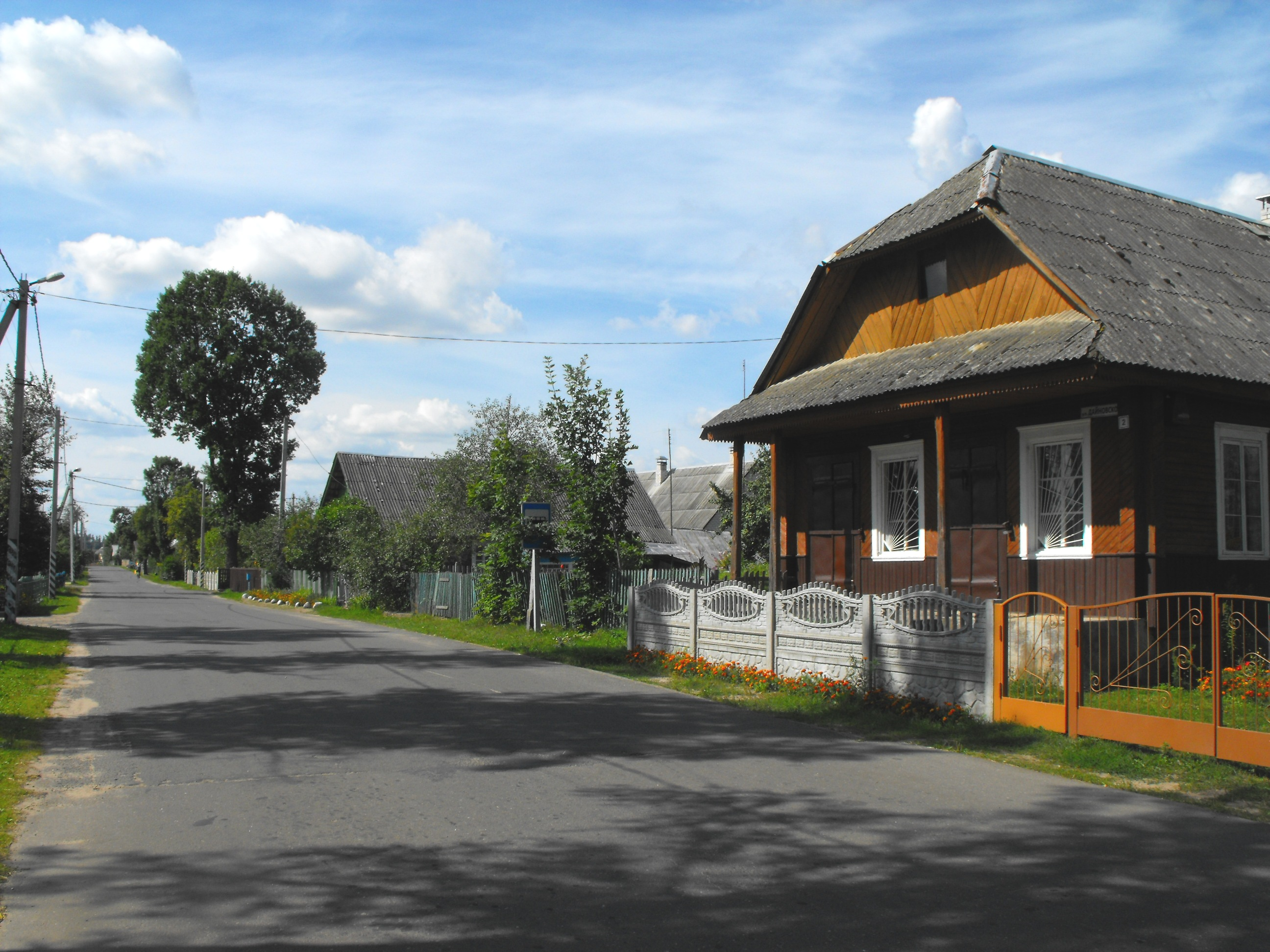

- Location within Belarus
- Coordinates: 54°09′25″N 26°55′10″E
- Country: Belarus
- Region: Minsk Region
- District: Maladzyechna District

Population (2010)
  - Total: 405
- Time zone: UTC+3 (MSK)
- Website: horodok.by

Haradok (Belarusian: Гарадок; Russian: Городок, romanized: Gorodok; Polish: Gródek) is an agrotown in Maladzyechna District, Minsk Region, Belarus. It serves as the administrative center of Haradok selsoviet. It is located 19 kilometres (12 mi) from Maladzyechna and 60 kilometres (37 mi) from the capital Minsk. In 1996, it had a population of 576. In 2010, it had a population of 405.

== History ==
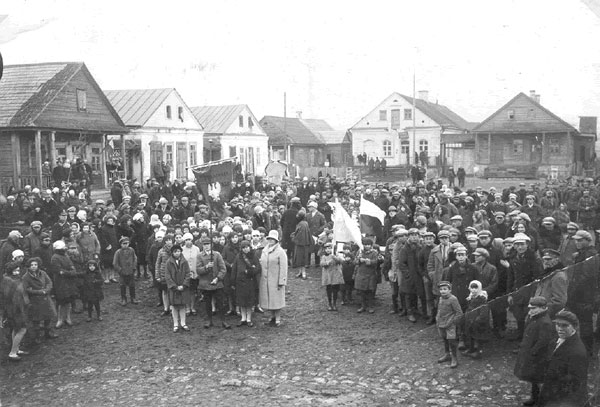
3 May Constitution Day in Gródek in 1929

During the interwar period, it was part of Poland. In the 1921 census, 42.0% people declared Polish nationality, 33.1% declared Jewish nationality, 24.2% declared Belarusian nationality.

Following the invasion of Poland, the town was first occupied by the Soviet Union until 1941, then by Nazi Germany until 1944, and re-occupied by the Soviet Union afterwards.
