= Atolina =

Agrotown in Minsk Region, Belarus

Atolina Атоліна (Belarusian) Атолино (Russian)
- Agrotown
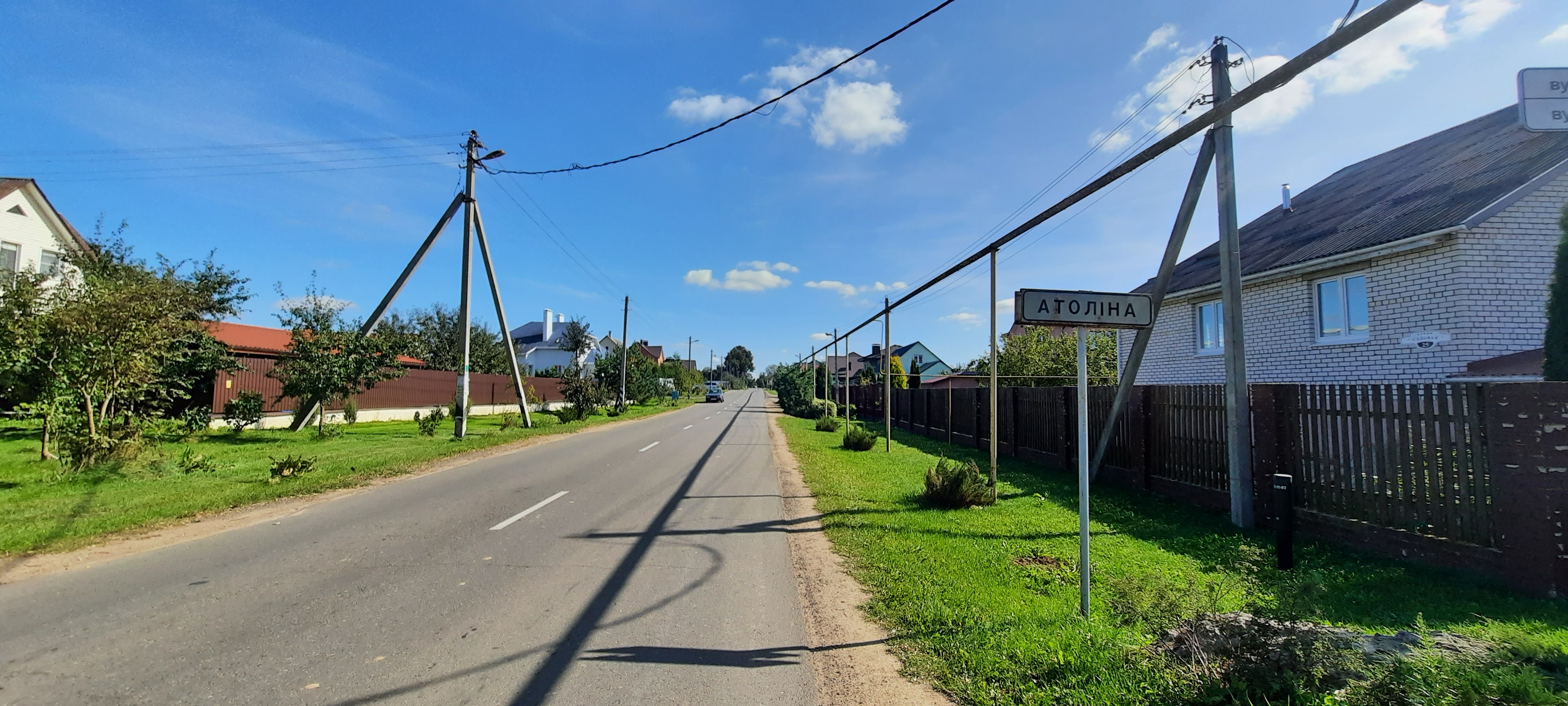

- Location within Belarus
- Coordinates: 53°46′59″N 27°26′06″E
- Country: Belarus
- Region: Minsk Region
- District: Minsk District

Population (2010)
  - Total: 1,418
- Time zone: UTC+3 (MSK)

Atolina (Belarusian: Атоліна; Russian: Атолино, romanized: Atolino) is an agrotown in Minsk District, Minsk Region, Belarus. It is administratively part of Syenitsa rural council. It is located about 7.5 kilometres (4.7 mi) from the Minsk Ring Road, south of the capital Minsk. In 2010, it had a population of 1,418.

== Adamas Invest ==
In 2013 a legal entity Adamas Invest LLC was registered in Atolina, owned by the Administration of the President. It claimed to be the largest manufacturer of artificial diamonds in Europe. In 2020 the owner decided to liquidate it and it was declared bankrupt. In 2022 it was put on auction.
