= Pyeskawtsy, Lida district, Grodno region =

Agrotown in Grodno Region, Belarus

Pyeskawtsy Пескаўцы (Belarusian) Песковцы (Russian)
- Agrotown
- Location within Belarus
- Coordinates: 53°33′45″N 25°10′30″E
- Country: Belarus
- Region: Grodno Region
- District: Lida District
- Time zone: UTC+3 (MSK)

Pyeskawtsy (Belarusian: Пескаўцы, romanized: Pieskaŭcy; Russian: Песковцы, romanized: Peskovtsy) is an agrotown in Lida District, Grodno Region, Belarus. It is administratively part of Byelitsa selsoviet; until 2016, it served as the administrative center of the former Pyeskawtsy selsoviet. It is located approximately 50 kilometres (31 mi) south of Lida and 100 kilometres (62 mi) west of Grodno.
