= Hatava =

Agrotown in Minsk Region, Belarus

Hatava Гатава (Belarusian) Гатово (Russian)
- Agrotown
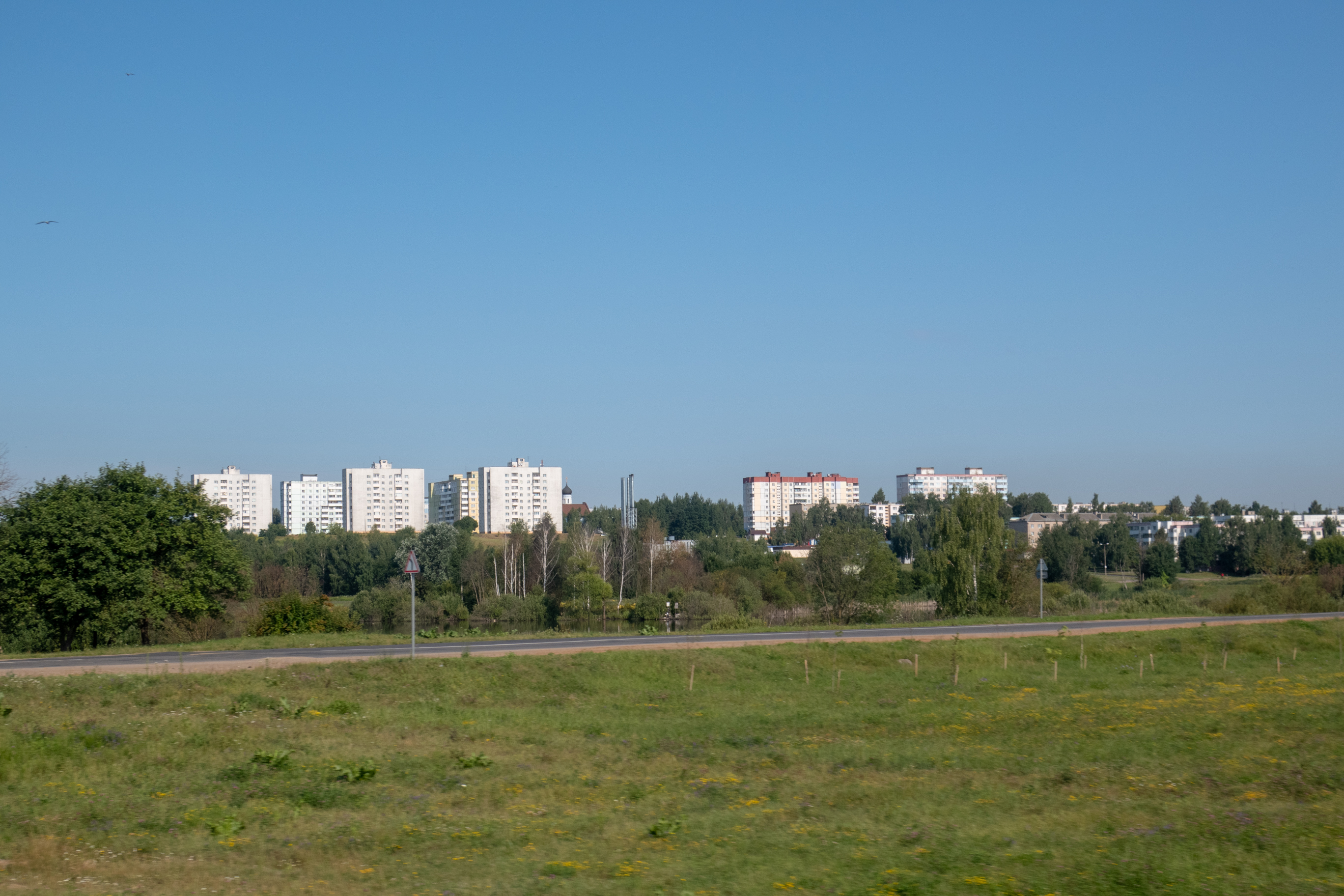

- Location within Belarus
- Coordinates: 53°47′04″N 27°38′34″E
- Country: Belarus
- Region: Minsk Region
- District: Minsk District

Population (2012)
  - Total: 7,262
- Time zone: UTC+3 (MSK)

Hatava (Belarusian: Гатава; Russian: Гатово, romanized: Gatovo) is an agrotown in Minsk District, Minsk Region, Belarus. It is administratively part of Navadvorski selsaviet. It is located five kilometres (3.1 mi) south of the capital Minsk. In 2012, it had a population of 7,262.
