= Kryvichy, Salihorsk district =

Agrotown in Minsk Region, Belarus

Kryvichy Крывічы (Belarusian) Кривичи (Russian)
- Agrotown
- Location within Belarus
- Coordinates: 52°49′20″N 27°23′26″E
- Country: Belarus
- Region: Minsk Region
- District: Salihorsk District
- Time zone: UTC+3 (MSK)

Kryvichy (Belarusian: Крывічы, romanized: Kryvičy; Russian: Кривичи, romanized: Krivichi) is an agrotown in Salihorsk District, Minsk Region, Belarus. It is part of Krasnadvortsy selsoviet.
