= Starytsa, Kapyl district =

Village in Minsk Region, Belarus

Starytsa Старыца (Belarusian) Старица (Russian)
- Agrotown
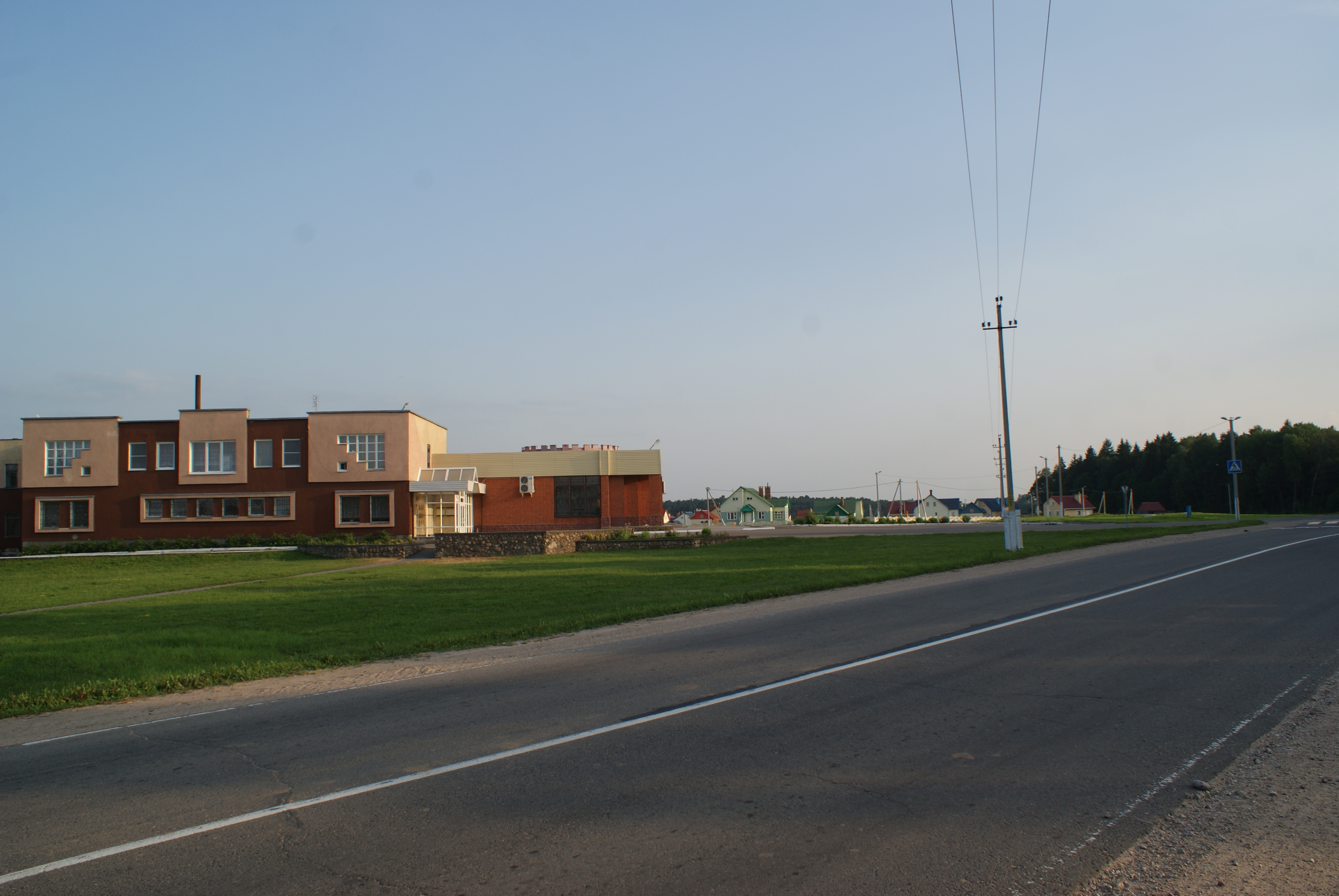

- Location within Belarus
- Coordinates: 53°13′58″N 27°16′12″E
- Country: Belarus
- Region: Minsk Region
- District: Kapyl District

Population (2010)
  - Total: 607
- Time zone: UTC+3 (MSK)

Starytsa (Belarusian: Старыца, romanized: Staryca; Russian: Старица, romanized: Staritsa) is an agrotown in Kapyl District, Minsk Region, Belarus. It is administratively part of Slabada-Kuchynka rural council. It is situated 16 kilometres (9.9 mi) from Kapyl and 104 kilometres (65 mi) from the capital Minsk. In 2010, it had a population of 607.

== History ==
From 1924 to 1954, it was the administrative center of Satrytsa rural council.
