= Lipyen =

Agrotown in Mogilev Region, Belarus

Lipyen Ліпень (Belarusian) Липень (Russian)
- Agrotown
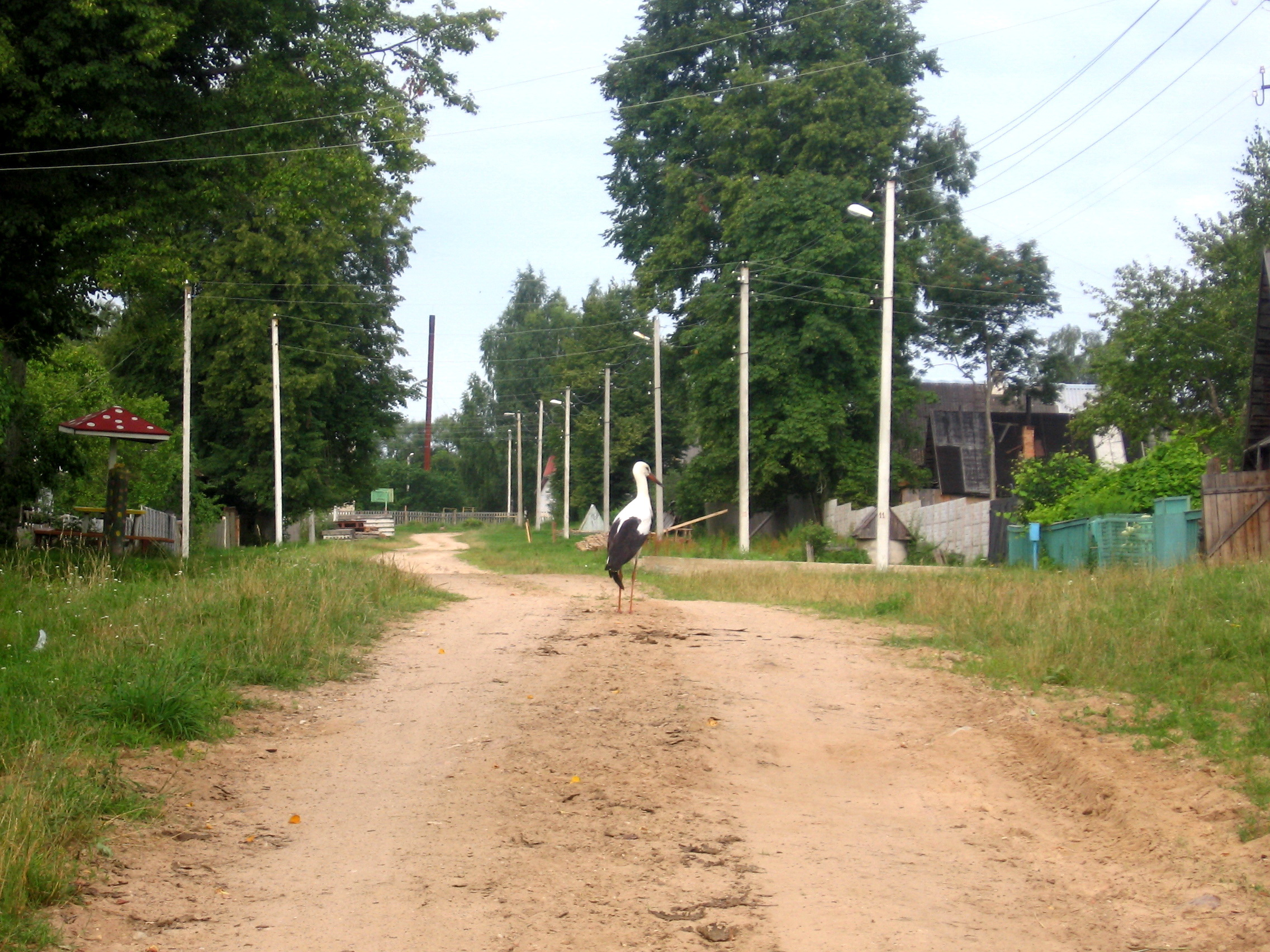

- Location within Belarus
- Coordinates: 53°24′50″N 28°49′11″E
- Country: Belarus
- Region: Mogilev Region
- District: Asipovichy District

Population (1999)
  - Total: 1,000
- Time zone: UTC+3 (MSK)

Lipyen or Lipen (Belarusian: Ліпень, romanized: Lipień; Russian: Липень) is an agrotown in Asipovichy District, Mogilev Region, Belarus. It is located 20 kilometres (12 mi) from Asipovichy and 126 kilometres (78 mi) from Mogilev. It serves as the administrative center of Lipyen selsoviet. In 1999, it had a population of 1,000.

== History ==
According to the 1926 Soviet census, there were 441 Jews living in Lipyen.

=== World War II ===
During World War II, it was under German military occupation from early July 1941 until June 1944. About 200 Jews remained there at the start of the occupation.

In August 1941, all Jews were placed in a ghetto consisting of several houses. The ghetto was liquidated in October and the Germans shot more than 200 Jews near the Svislach River.

== Sources ==
- Megargee, Geoffrey P.; Dean, Martin (2012). The United States Holocaust Memorial Museum Encyclopedia of Camps and Ghettos 1933–1945. Volume II. Indiana University Press, United States Holocaust Memorial Museum. p. 1701. ISBN 978-0-253-35599-7.
- "Ліпень". Беларуская энцыклапедыя: У 18 т. Т. 9: Кулібін — Малаіта (in Belarusian). Minsk: Беларуская энцыклапедыя. 1999. p. 273. ISBN 985-11-0155-9.
