= Agrotown (Belarus) =

Type of rural settlement in Belarus

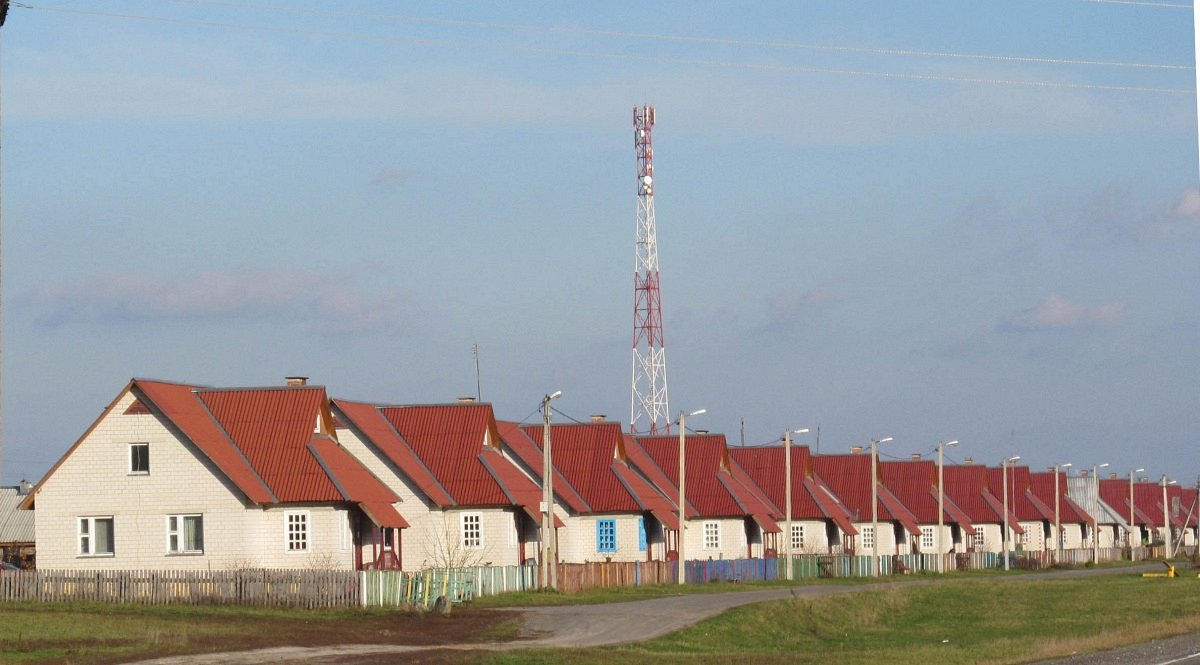
Baravoye agrotown in Lyelchytsy District

An agrotown (Belarusian: аграгарадок, romanized: ahraharadok; Russian: агрогородок, romanized: agrogorodok) is an official type of rural settlement in Belarus introduced by a law passed in 1998. The law defines agrotowns as well-developed rural settlements with industrial and social infrastructure to ensure social standards for population living there and in the surrounding areas.

The law further says that if a selsoviet (rural council) has agrotowns, its administrative center must be in an agrotown. If there is more than one agrotown, the selsoviet center is assigned by the District Council of Deputies.

The Belarusian government launched the program "State program for the revival and development of rural areas, for years 2005-2010" (Russian: Государственная программа возрождения и развития села на 2005—2010 годы), which provided for the establishment of agrotowns. By the end of the time allotted for the program, i.e., by January 2011, 1,512 agrotowns were established in Belarus, with about 8,000 new houses built.

== List of agrotowns ==
=== Brest Region ===
- Aharodniki
- Dzivin
- Kamyanyuki
- Kazhan-Haradok
- Lyasnaya
- Lyeninski
- Makarava
- Milyeyki
- Olshany
- Rasna
- Syalyets
- Tamashowka
- Volya

=== Gomel Region ===
- Baravoye
- Dovsk
- Myalyeshkavichy
- Shchadryn
- Luchyn

=== Grodno Region ===
- Adelsk
- Dzyarechyn
- Hyeranyony
- Hyervyaty
- Kreva
- Lunna
- Muravanaya Ashmyanka
- Pyershamaysk
- Pyeskawtsy
- Subotniki
- Usyelyub
- Vasilishki
- Vowpa
- Zhyrmuny

=== Minsk Region ===
- Abchuha
- Aktsyabr
- Alyakhnovichy
- Asavyets
- Astrashytski Haradok
- Atolina
- Azdzyatsichy
- Azyartso
- Blon
- Balshavik
- Budslaw
- Byerazinskaye
- Bystrytsa
- Chachkava
- Churylavichy
- Dawhinava
- Haradok
- Hatava
- Hresk
- Hrozava
- Ilya
- Kalodzishchy
- Khatsyezhyna
- Khazhova
- Khorastava
- Kishchyna Slabada
- Knyahinin
- Kosawka
- Kraysk
- Krupitsa
- Kryvichy
- Lashany
- Loshnitsa
- Luhavaya Slabada
- Lyasny
- Lyebyedzyeva
- Maisyeyewshchyna
- Malyya Haradzyatsichy
- Markava
- Mikhanavichy
- Nalibaki
- Narach
- Navasyellye
- Novy Dvor
- Novyya Doktaravichy
- Nyeharelaye
- Pahost
- Palachany
- Patsyeyki
- Pryluki
- Pyasochnaye
- Pyatryshki
- Pyerasady
- Rachen
- Rakaw
- Ratamka
- Samakhvalavichy
- Sarachy
- Sharshuny
- Shatsk
- Shchomyslitsa
- Shchytkavichy
- Sinyawka
- Skirmantava
- Slabada
- Sosny
- Sosny 2
- Starabarysaw
- Starytsa
- Staryya Haby
- Svatki
- Syemyezhava
- Syenitsa
- Syomkava
- Tal
- Tsimkavichy
- Vishnyavyets
- Vishnyowka
- Vyalyatsichy
- Vyvyery
- Yuzufova
- Zamastochcha
- Zanarach
- Zembin
- Zhdanovichy

=== Mogilev Region ===
- Dashkawka
- Lapichy
- Lipyen
- Lyasnaya
- Lyenina
- Malyatsichy
- Novy Bykhaw
- Paloshkava
- Svislach
- Tsyatsyeryn

=== Vitebsk Region ===
- Aboltsy
- Astrowna
- Babinavichy
- Druya
- Dunilavichy
- Kamai
- Klyastsitsy
- Luzhki
- Lyady
- Prazaroki
- Smalyany

== See also ==
- List of urban-type settlements in Belarus
