= Blon =

Blon Блонь
- Agrotown
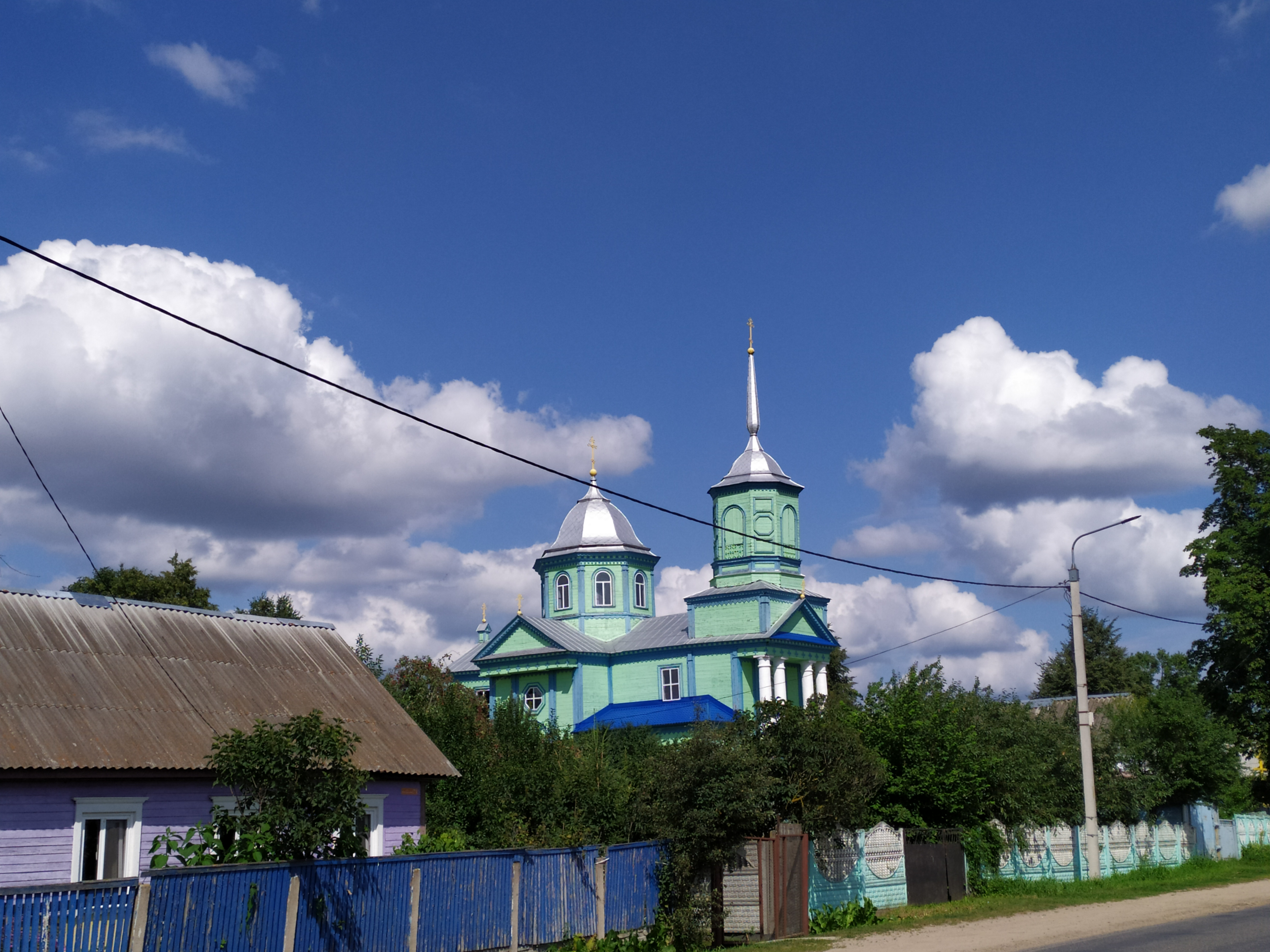

- Location within Belarus
- Coordinates: 53°31′44″N 28°10′38″E
- Country: Belarus
- Region: Minsk Region
- District: Pukhavichy District
- Time zone: UTC+3 (MSK)

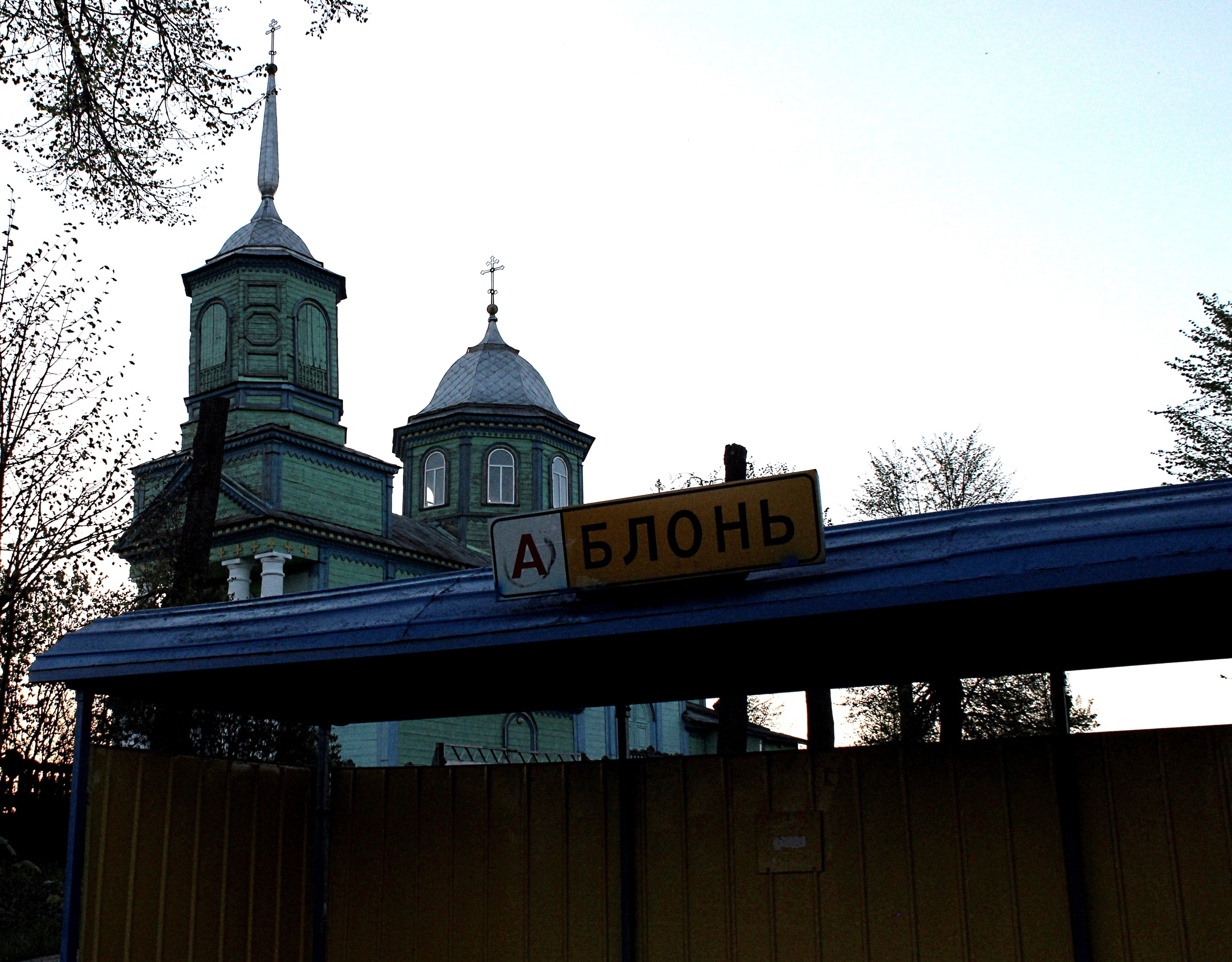
A bus stop for Blon (central)

Blon (Belarusian: Блонь; Russian: Блонь; Polish: Błoń) is an agrotown in Pukhavichy District, Minsk Region, Belarus. It serves as the administrative center of Blon selsoviet.

== History ==
Historically Blon (Błoń) belonged to Igumensky Uyezd in the Russian Empire, which was earlier part of Minsk Powiat in the Grand Duchy of Lithuania. It is associated with Jesuit priest and poet Józef Baka, who established there a Jesuit monastery in about 1745 and a wooden church of John the Baptist around 1748. After his death, it was passed to the Jesuit order, and after the suppression of the Jesuits the properties were seized by a Poniński and later passed to Ossowskis of Dołęga coat of arms. In 1863, they were sequestrated as a punishment for taking part in the January Uprising, and in 1868, they were sold to a civil official, Bończ-Osmołowski (Иосиф Александрович Бонч-Осмоловский), from which lands the properties of włościans (pl:włościanin, a land-owning peasant) were separated, leaving about 2,250 morgen of arable land.
