= Kraysk =

Agrotown in Minsk Region, Belarus

Kraysk Крайск
- Agrotown
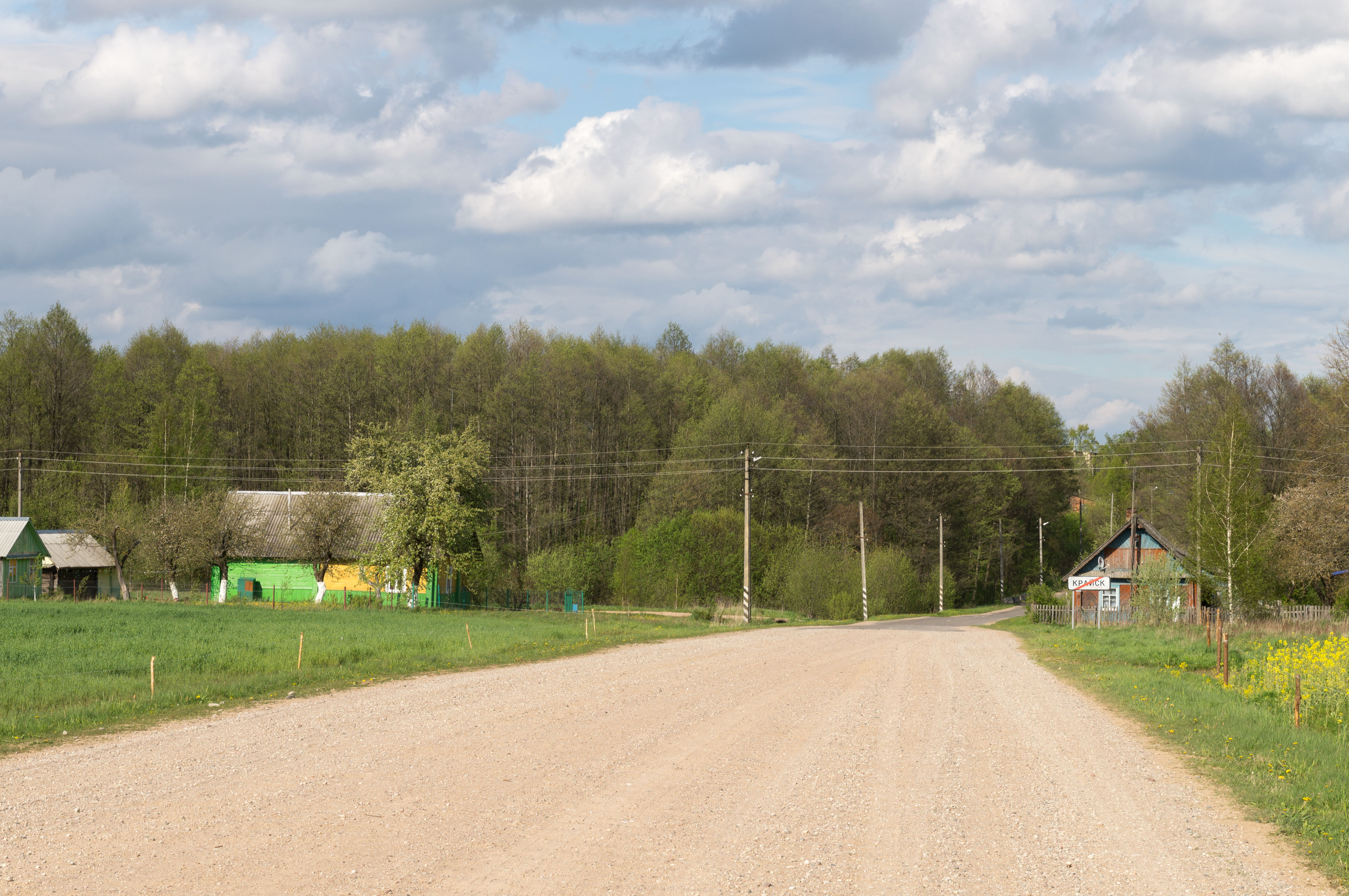

- Location within Belarus
- Coordinates: 54°31′16″N 27°30′00″E
- Country: Belarus
- Region: Minsk Region
- District: Lahoysk District

Population (2010)
  - Total: 346
- Time zone: UTC+3 (MSK)

Kraysk (Belarusian: Крайск, romanized: Krajsk; Russian: Крайск) is an agrotown in Lahoysk District, Minsk Region, Belarus. It serves as the administrative center of Kraysk selsoviet. It is located 58 kilometres (36 mi) from Lahoysk and 97 kilometres (60 mi) from the capital Minsk. In 1998, it had a population of 412. In 2010, it had a population of 346.
