= Baravoye, Lyelchytsy district, Gomel region =

Agrotown in Gomel Region, Belarus

Baravoye Баравое (Belarusian) Боровое (Russian)
- Agrotown
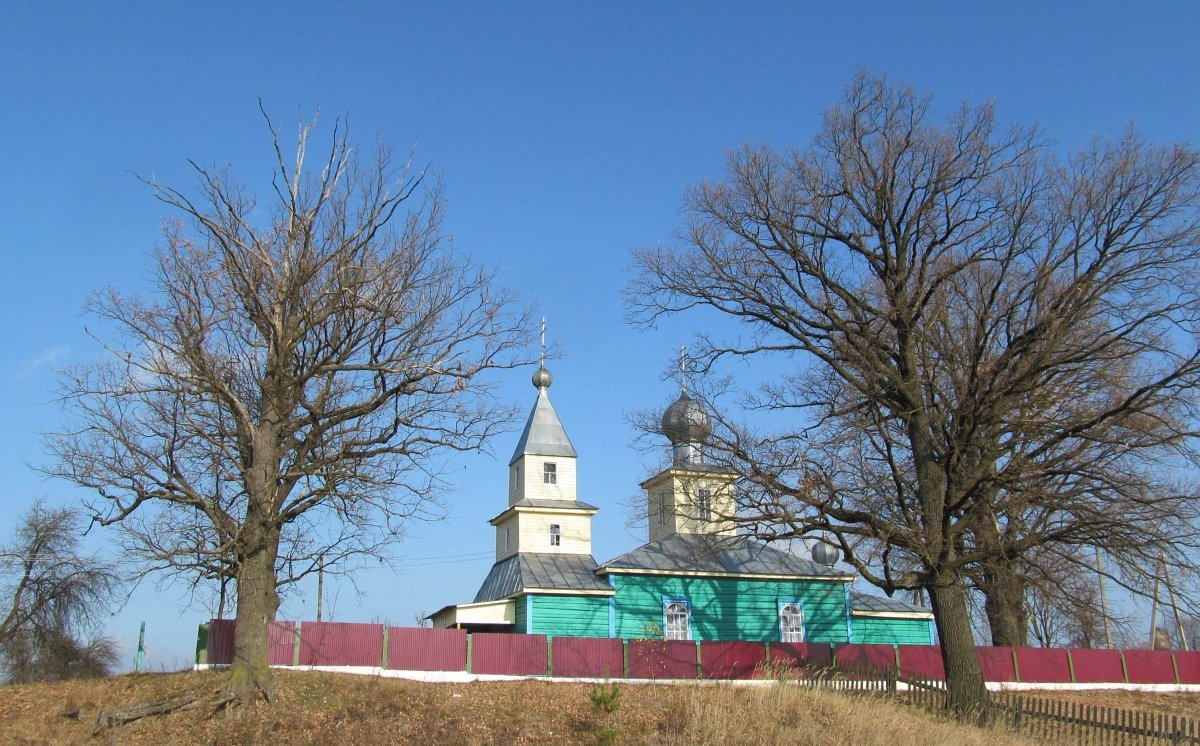

- Location within Belarus
- Coordinates: 51°42′51″N 28°03′15″E
- Country: Belarus
- Region: Gomel Region
- District: Lyelchytsy District
- Time zone: UTC+3 (MSK)

Baravoye (Belarusian: Баравое, romanized: Baravoje; Russian: Боровое, romanized: Borovoye) is an agrotown in Lyelchytsy District, Gomel Region, Belarus. It serves as the administrative center of Baravoye selsoviet.
