= Lapichy =

Agrotown in Mogilev Region, Belarus

Lapichy Лапічы (Belarusian) Лапичи (Russian)
- Agrotown
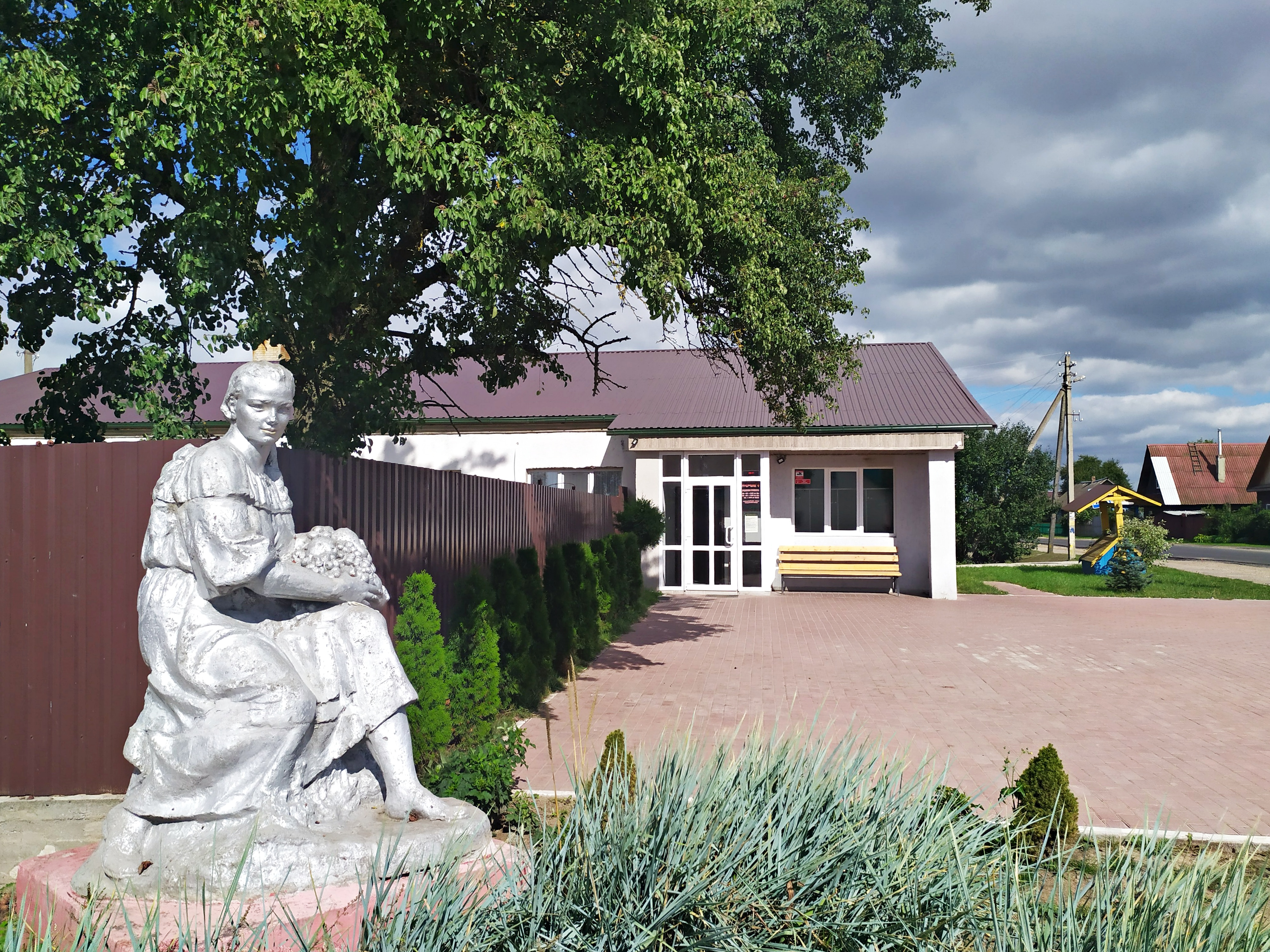

- Location within Belarus
- Coordinates: 53°25′46″N 28°31′15″E
- Country: Belarus
- Region: Mogilev Region
- District: Asipovichy District
- First mentioned: 1560

Population (1998)
  - Total: 1,012
- Time zone: UTC+3 (MSK)

Lapichy (Belarusian: Лапічы, romanized: Lapičy; Russian: Лапичи, romanized: Lapichi) is an agrotown in Asipovichy District, Mogilev Region, Belarus. It is located 25 kilometres (16 mi) from Asipovichy and 186 kilometres (116 mi) from Mogilev. It serves as the administrative center of Lapichy selsoviet. In 1998, it had a population of 1,012.

== History ==
The settlement is first mentioned in 1560 as belonging to the Svislach volost within the Grand Duchy of Lithuania. During the administrative reforms of 1565–1566, it was included in Minsk Voivodeship.

Following its incorporation into the Russian Empire in 1793, it was included in Igumensky Uyezd of Minsk Governorate.

According to the 1926 Soviet census, there were 907 Jews living in Lapichy. By mid-1941, the Jewish population had decreased substantially due to emigration.

=== World War II ===
During World War II, it was under German military occupation from early July 1941 until June 1944. About 300 Jews remained there at the start of the occupation.

The first Aktion took place on 18 August 1941, in which an Einsatzkommando detachment shot 107 Jews who were accused of supporting the partisans. In January 1942, the Germans rounded up the Jews and placed them in three houses. 10 or 12 were kept behind and shot. In April, the Germans gathered the more than 140 remaining Jews and shot them.

== Sources ==
- Megargee, Geoffrey P.; Dean, Martin (2012). The United States Holocaust Memorial Museum Encyclopedia of Camps and Ghettos 1933–1945. Volume II. Indiana University Press, United States Holocaust Memorial Museum. p. 1695. ISBN 978-0-253-35599-7.
- Nasevich, V. L. (1999). "Лапічы". Беларуская энцыклапедыя: У 18 т. Т. 9: Кулібін — Малаіта (in Belarusian). Minsk: Беларуская энцыклапедыя. p. 133. ISBN 985-11-0155-9.
