= Pryluki, Minsk region =

Agrotown in Minsk Region, Belarus

Pryluki Прылукі (Belarusian) Прилуки (Russian)
- Agrotown
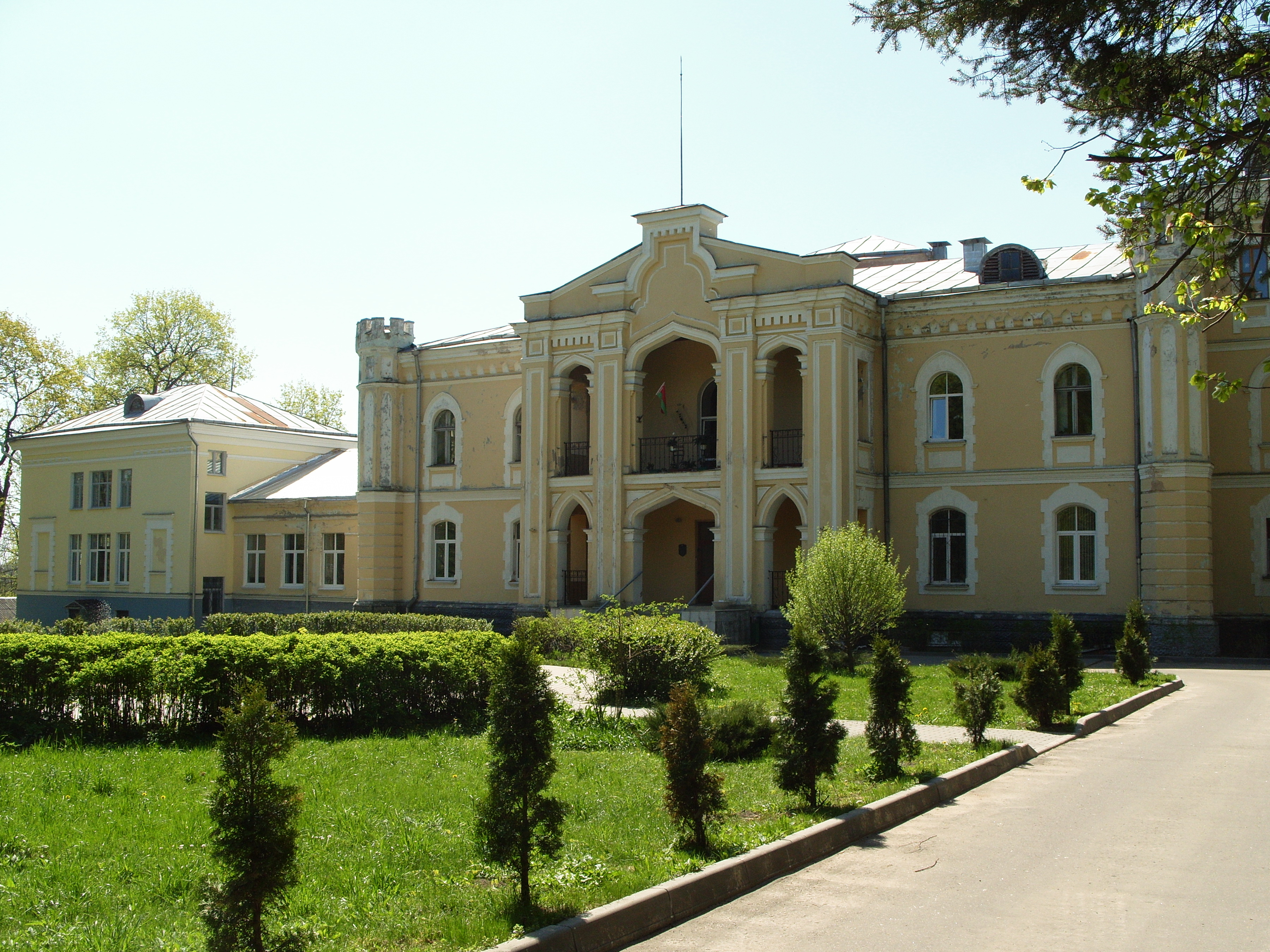

- Location within Belarus
- Coordinates: 53°47′31″N 27°26′58″E
- Country: Belarus
- Region: Minsk Region
- District: Minsk District

Population (2010)
  - Total: 1,828
- Time zone: UTC+3 (MSK)

Pryluki (Belarusian: Прылукі; Russian: Прилуки, romanized: Priluki) is an agrotown in Minsk District, Minsk Region, Belarus. It is administratively part of Syenitsa selsoviet. It is located six kilometres (3.7 mi) south of the capital Minsk. In 2000, it had a population of 1,483. In 2010, it had a population of 1,828.
