= Pyasochnaye =

Agrotown in Minsk Region, Belarus

Pyasochnaye Пясочнае (Belarusian) Песочное (Russian)
- Agrotown
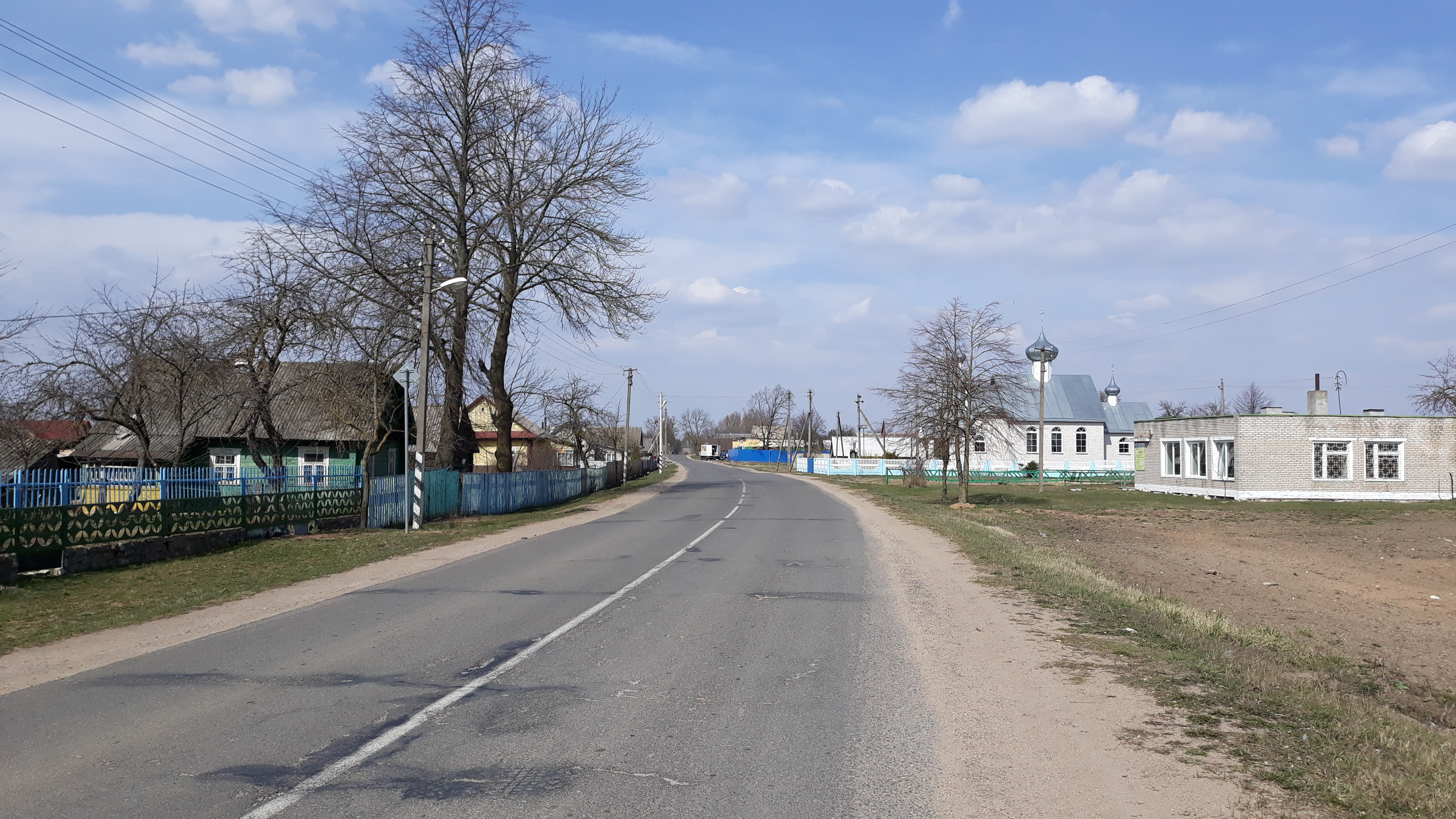

- Location within Belarus
- Coordinates: 53°20′10″N 27°06′03″E
- Country: Belarus
- Region: Minsk Region
- District: Kapyl District

Population (2001)
  - Total: 620
- Time zone: UTC+3 (MSK)

Pyasochnaye (Belarusian: Пясочнае, romanized: Piasočnaje; Russian: Песочное, romanized: Pesochnoye) is an agrotown in Kapyl District, Minsk Region, Belarus. It is administratively part of Babownya selsoviet; it was previously part of Slabada-Kuchynka selsoviet. It is situated 26 kilometres (16 mi) from Kapyl and 93 kilometres (58 mi) from the capital Minsk. In 2001, it had a population of 620.
