= Lyasnaya, Brest region =

Agrotown in Brest Region, Belarus

Lyasnaya Лясная
- Agrotown
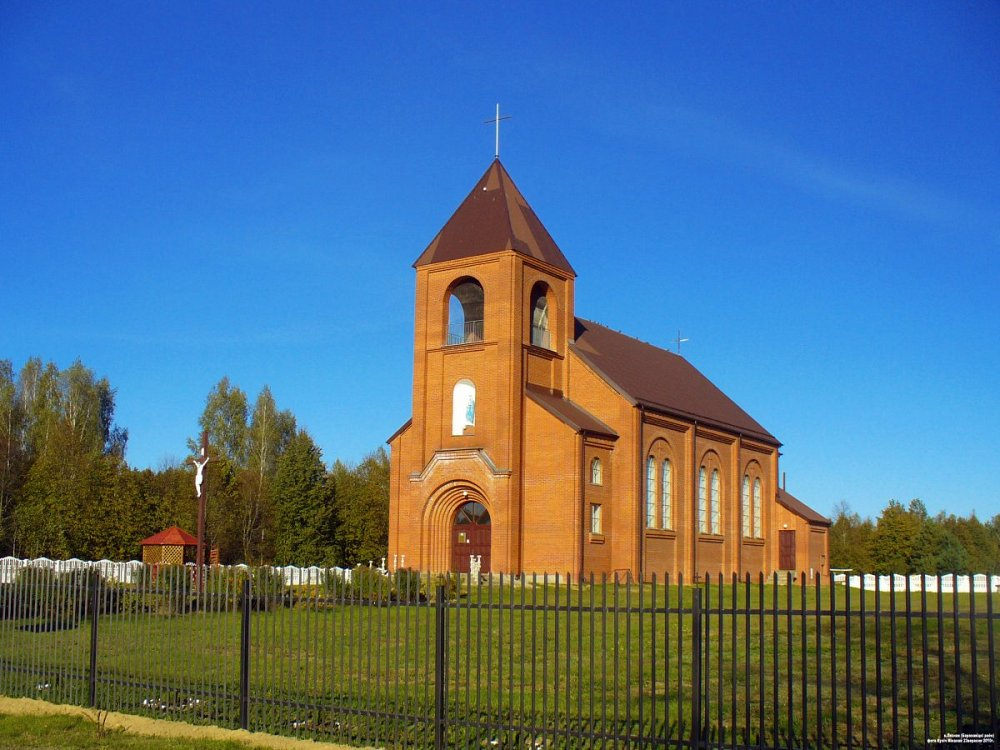
- Church

- Location within Belarus
- Coordinates: 52°59′N 25°46′E
- Country: Belarus
- Region: Brest Region
- District: Baranavichy District
- Time zone: UTC+3 (MSK)

Lyasnaya (Belarusian: Лясная, romanized: Liasnaja; Russian: Лесная, romanized: Lesnaya; Polish: Leśna) is an agrotown in Baranavichy District, Brest Region, western Belarus.

== History ==
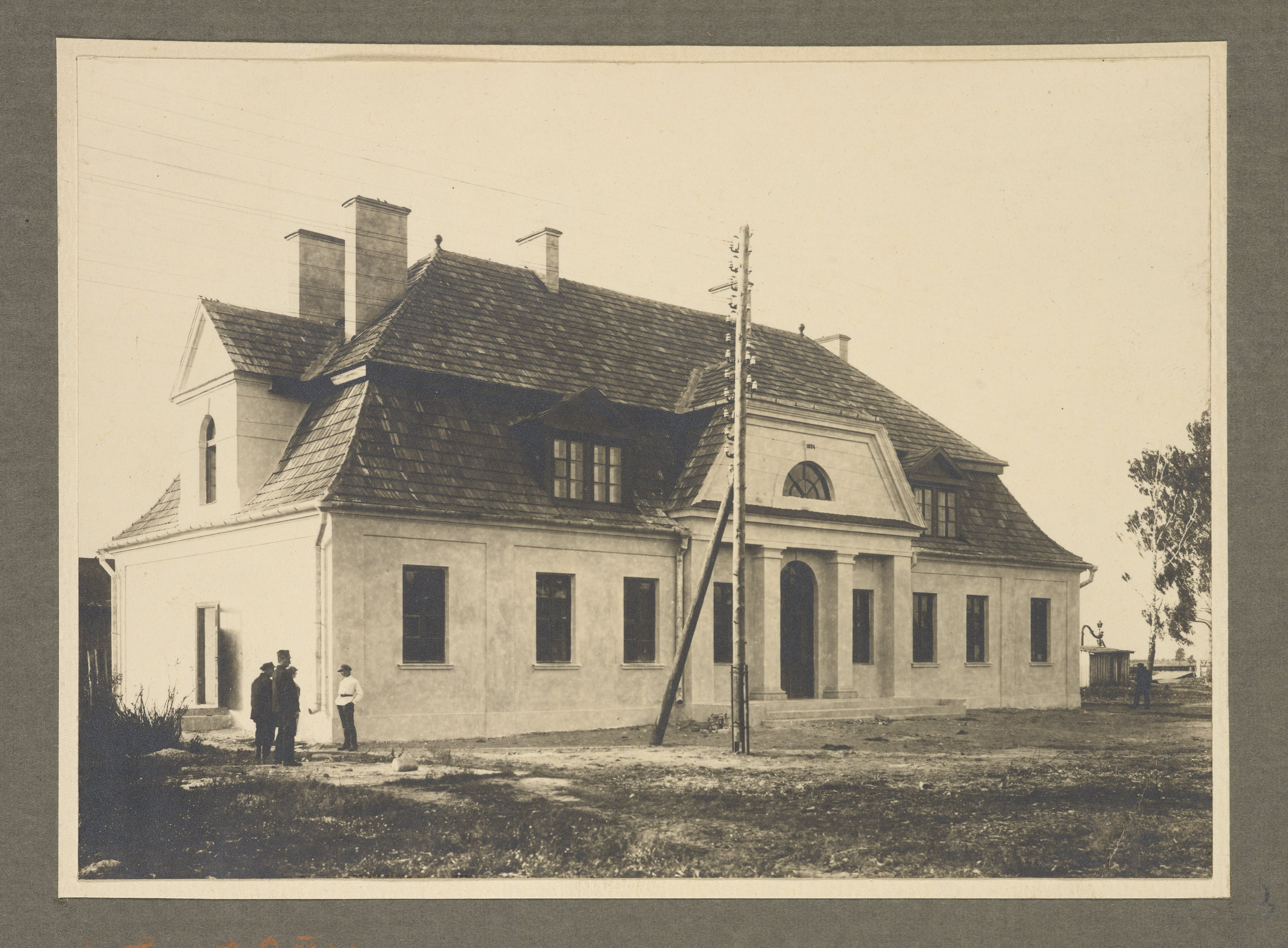
Railway station in 1925

In the interbellum, Leśna, as it was known in Polish, was administratively located in the Baranowicze County in the Nowogródek Voivodeship of Poland. According to the 1921 Polish census, the population was 84.4% Polish and 13.2% Belarusian.

Following the invasion of Poland in September 1939, Leśna was first occupied by the Soviet Union until 1941, then by Nazi Germany until 1944. The Germans operated the Stalag 337 prisoner-of-war camp for some 50,000 POWs at the local railway station with additional subcamps in Baranowicze and Slutsk. The camp was relocated to Mantua, Italy in November 1943. In late 1942, also a ghetto for some 70 Jews, including refugees from the more western part of German-occupied Poland, was established in the settlement, and some Jews were subjected to forced labour. On 13 March 1943, some 70 Jews were mass murdered by the German forces. A woman and her two-year-old child escaped the massacre and survived. In 1944, the settlement was re-occupied by the Soviet Union, which eventually annexed it from Poland in 1945.
