= Slabada, Slabada selsoviet, Myadzyel district =

Agrotown in Minsk Region, Belarus

Slabada Слабада (Belarusian) Слобода (Russian)
- Agrotown
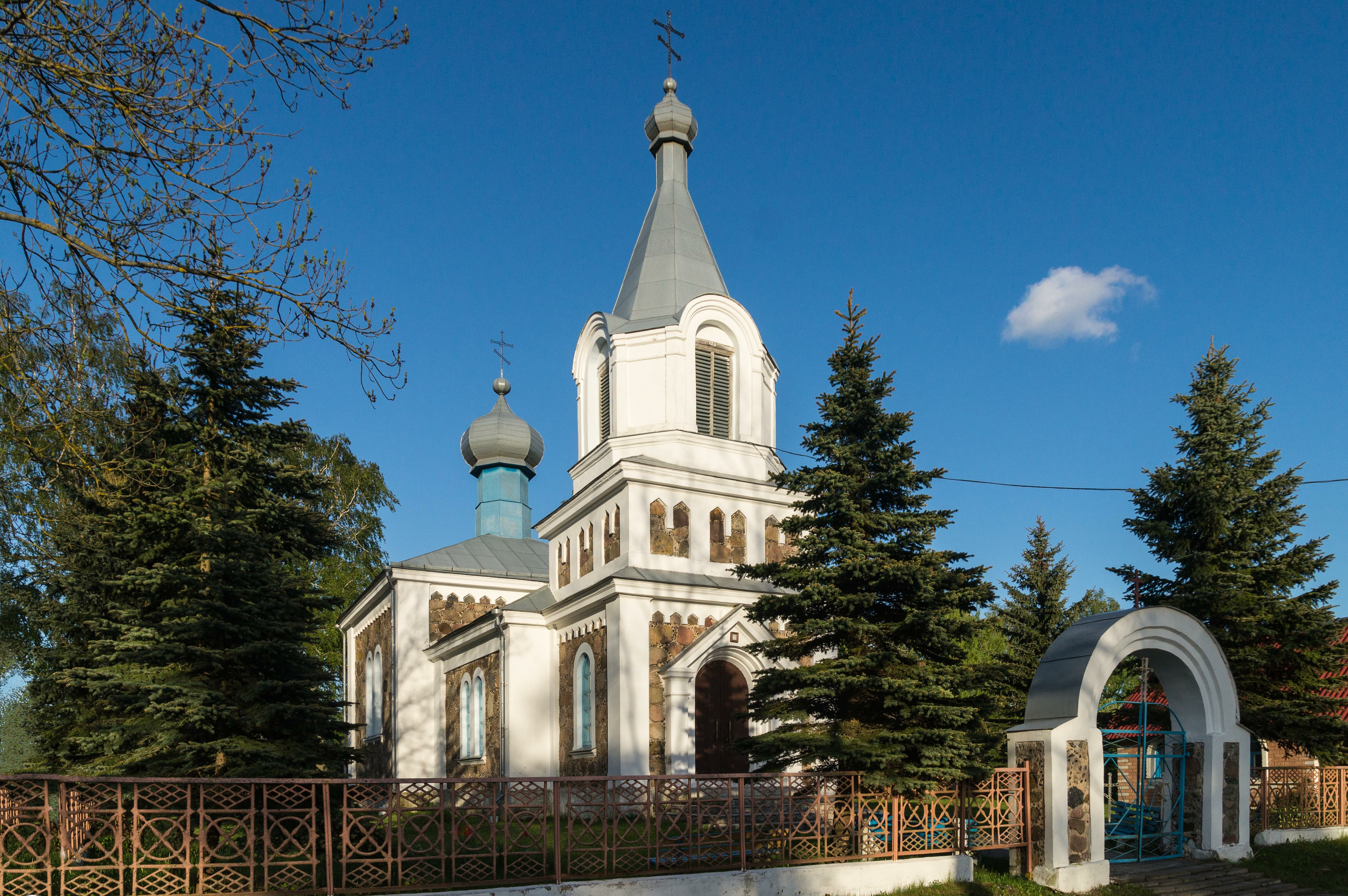

- Location within Belarus
- Coordinates: 54°56′43″N 27°11′07″E
- Country: Belarus
- Region: Minsk Region
- District: Myadzyel District

Population (2011)
  - Total: 516
- Time zone: UTC+3 (MSK)

Slabada (Belarusian: Слабада; Russian: Слобода́, romanized: Sloboda) is an agrotown in Myadzyel District, Minsk Region, Belarus. It serves as the administrative center of Slabada selsoviet. It is located 21 kilometres (13 mi) from Myadzyel, 23 kilometres (14 mi) from Varapayeva, and 171 kilometres (106 mi) from the capital Minsk. In 2001, it had a population of 244. In 2011, it had a population of 218.
