= Staryya Haby =

Agrotown in Minsk Region, Belarus

Staryya Haby Старыя Габы (Belarusian) Старые Габы (Russian)
- Agrotown
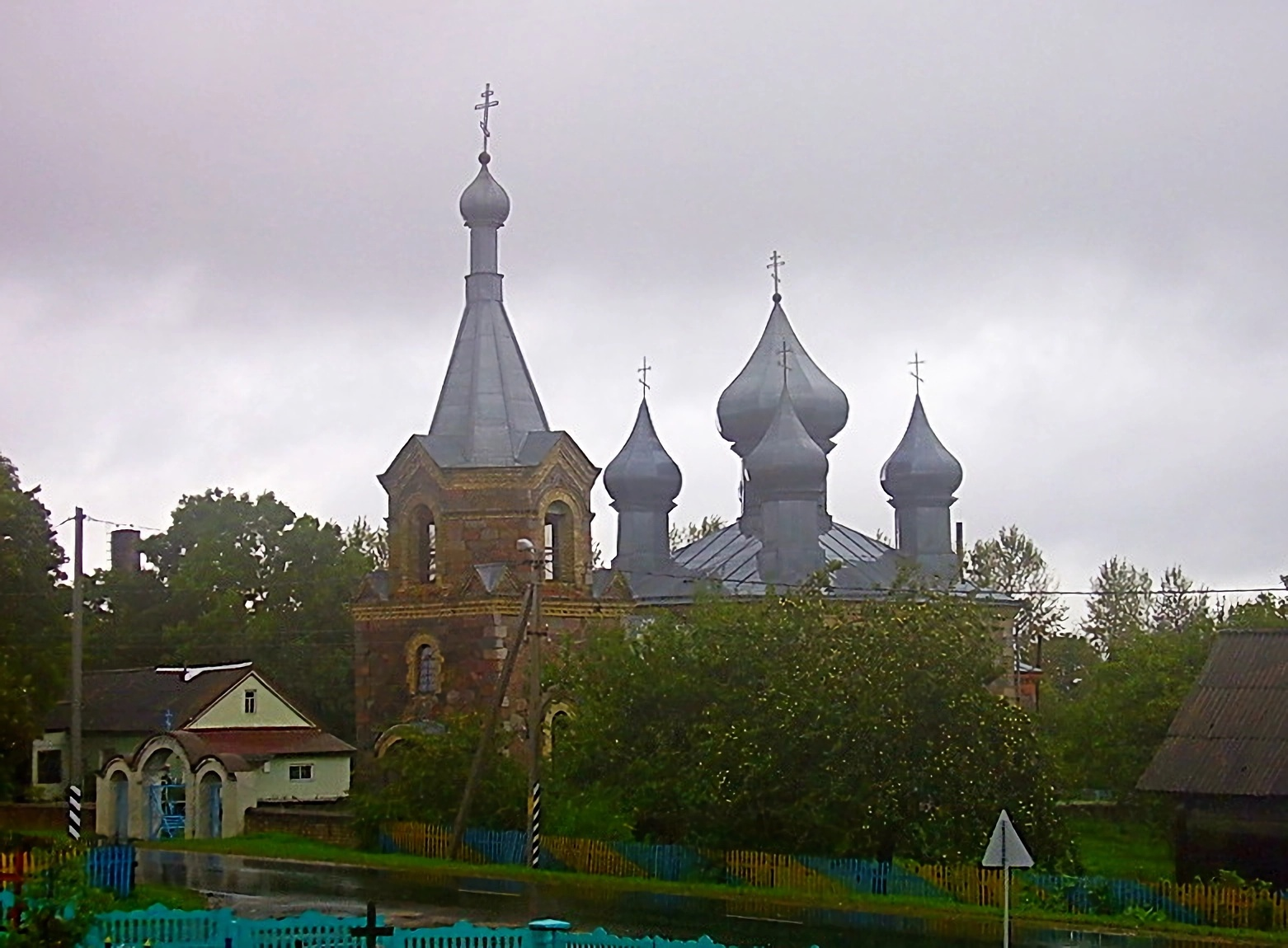

- Location within Belarus
- Coordinates: 54°52′59″N 27°16′28″E
- Country: Belarus
- Region: Minsk Region
- District: Myadzyel District

Population (2011)
  - Total: 316
- Time zone: UTC+3 (MSK)

Staryya Haby (Belarusian: Стары́я Га́бы, romanized: Staryja Haby; Russian: Ста́рые Га́бы, romanized: Staryye Gaby) is an agrotown in Myadzyel District, Minsk Region, Belarus. Since 2013, it is administratively part of Slabada selsoviet; previously it served as the administrative center of the former Staryya Haby selsoviet. It is located 30 kilometres (19 mi) from Myadzyel. In 2001, it had a population of 435. In 2011, it had a population of 316.
