= Churylavichy =

Agrotown in Minsk Region, Belarus

Churylavichy Чурылавічы (Belarusian) Чуриловичи (Russian)
- Agrotown
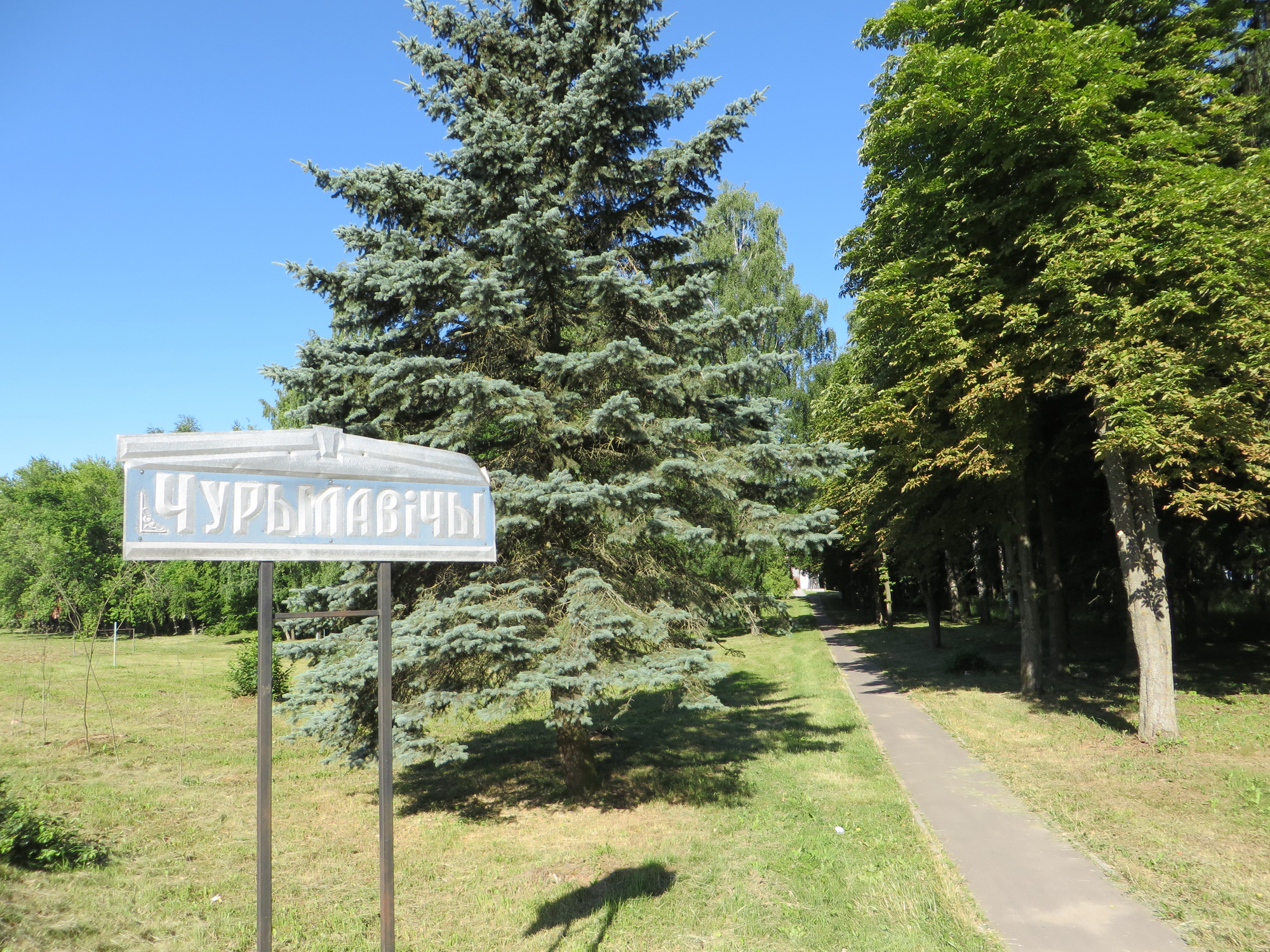

- Location within Belarus
- Coordinates: 53°44′55″N 27°34′10″E
- Country: Belarus
- Region: Minsk Region
- District: Minsk District

Population (2010)
  - Total: 873
- Time zone: UTC+3 (MSK)

Churylavichy (Belarusian: Чурылавічы, romanized: Čurylavičy; Russian: Чуриловичи, romanized: Churilovichi) is an agrotown in Minsk District, Minsk Region, Belarus. It is administratively part of Mikhanavichy selsoviet. It is located nine kilometres (5.6 mi) south of the capital Minsk. In 2010, it had a population of 873.
