= Vishnyowka, Papyernya selsoviet =

Agrotown in Minsk Region, Belarus

Vishnyowka Вішнёўка (Belarusian) Вишнёвка (Russian)
- Agrotown
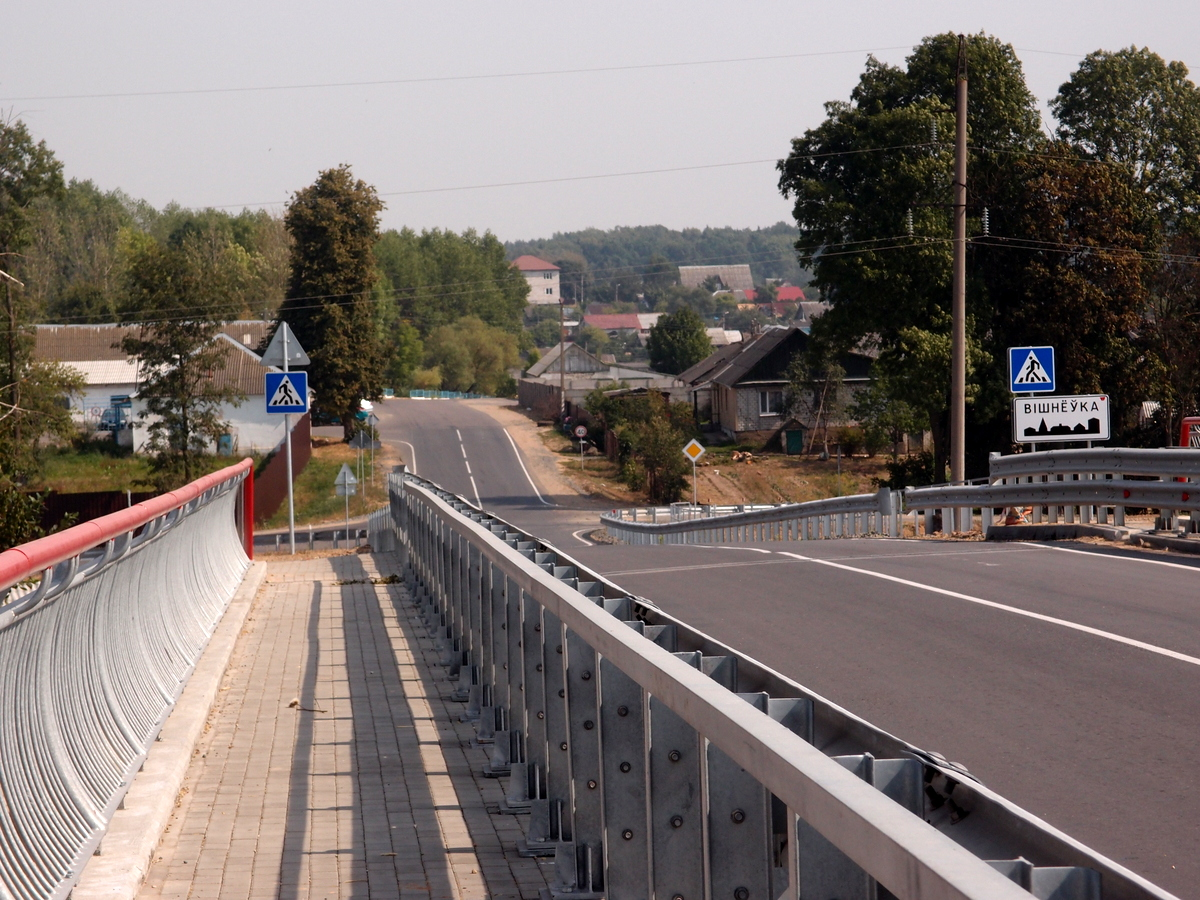

- Location within Belarus
- Coordinates: 54°03′46″N 27°33′17″E
- Country: Belarus
- Region: Minsk Region
- District: Minsk District

Population (2010)
  - Total: 1,034
- Time zone: UTC+3 (MSK)

Vishnyowka (Belarusian: Вішнёўка, romanized: Višnioŭka; Russian: Вишнёвка, romanized: Vishnyovka; also spelled Vishnevka) is an agrotown in Minsk District, Minsk Region, Belarus. It is administratively part of Papyernya selsoviet. It is located 11 kilometres (6.8 mi) from the Minsk Ring Road, north of the capital Minsk. In 1997, it had a population of 786. In 2010, it had a population of 1,034.
