= Milyeyki =

Agrotown in Brest Region, Belarus

Coordinates: 52°47′08″N 25°04′59″E

Milyeyki (Belarusian: Мілейкі, romanized: Miliejki, Russian: Милейки, Polish: Milejki) is an agrotown in Ivatsevichy district, Brest region, in south-western Belarus, the administrative center of Milyeyki rural council. As of 2025, the population is 492.
