= Pyershamaysk =

Agrotown in Grodno Region, Belarus

Pyershamaysk Першамайск
- Agrotown
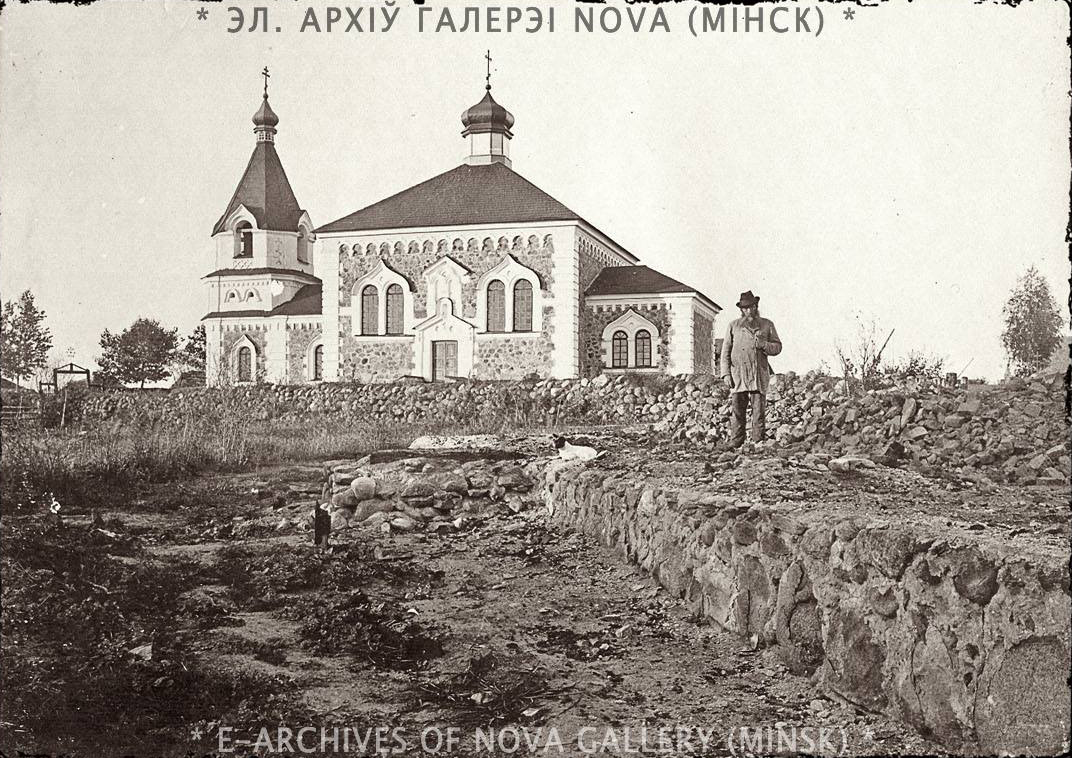
- Local church in c. 1900

- Location within Belarus
- Coordinates: 53°54′N 24°38′E
- Country: Belarus
- Region: Grodno Region
- District: Shchuchyn District
- Time zone: UTC+3 (MSK)

Pyershamaysk (Belarusian: Першамайск, romanized: Pieršamajsk; Russian: Першемайск, romanized: Pershemaysk), formerly Sabakintsy until 1954 (Belarusian: Сабакінцы; Polish: Sobakińce), is an agrotown in Shchuchyn District, Grodno Region, in western Belarus.

== History ==
Sobakińce was granted Magdeburg town rights by King John III Sobieski in 1676, renewed by King Augustus III of Poland in 1755. It was annexed by Russia in the Third Partition of Poland in 1795. Following World War I, Sobakińce, as it was known in Polish, was part of reborn Poland, within which it was the seat of a gmina, administratively located in the Nowogródek Voivodeship of Poland.

Following the invasion of Poland in September 1939, it was first occupied by the Soviet Union until 1941, then by Nazi Germany until 1944, and then re-occupied by the Soviet Union, which eventually annexed it from Poland in 1945.
