= Abchuha =

Agrotown in Mogilev Region, Belarus

Abchuha Абчуга (Belarusian) Обчуга (Russian)
- Agrotown
- Location within Belarus
- Coordinates: 54°29′46″N 29°21′57″E
- Country: Belarus
- Region: Minsk Region
- District: Krupki District

Population (2010)
  - Total: 180
- Time zone: UTC+3 (MSK)

Abchuha (Belarusian: Абчуга, romanized: Abčuha; Russian: Обчуга, romanized: Obchuga) is an agrotown in Krupki District, Minsk Region, Belarus. It is located 140 kilometres (87 mi) northeast of the capital Minsk. It is administratively part of Aktsyabrski selsoviet; it previously served as the administrative center of Abchuha selsoviet before it was abolished in 2013. In 2010, it had a population of 180.

== History ==
In 1923, there were 272 Jews living there, mostly in the center of the town.

=== World War II ===
During World War II, it was under German military occupation from early July 1941 until June 1944.

It is not known exactly when a ghetto was created, but this was at some point before the summer of 1942 when the Jews were placed in ten houses. On 5 May 1942, the Germans and local police surrounded the ghetto and shot most of the 440 Jews. The survivors of the shooting were later shot in June.

Following the war, the status of the settlement was downgraded from town to village due to the significant population loss.

== Sources ==
- Megargee, Geoffrey P.; Dean, Martin (2012). The United States Holocaust Memorial Museum Encyclopedia of Camps and Ghettos 1933–1945. Volume II. Indiana University Press, United States Holocaust Memorial Museum. p. 1708. ISBN 978-0-253-35599-7.
- Гарады і вёскі Беларусі: энцыклапедыя. Т. 8. Мінская вобласць. Кн. 2 (in Belarusian). Minsk: Беларуская Энцыклапедыя імя Петруся Броўкі. 2011. p. 341. ISBN 978-985-11-0554-6.
