= Byerazinskaye =

Agrotown in Minsk Region, Belarus

Byerazinskaye Беразінскае (Belarusian) Березинское (Russian)
- Agrotown
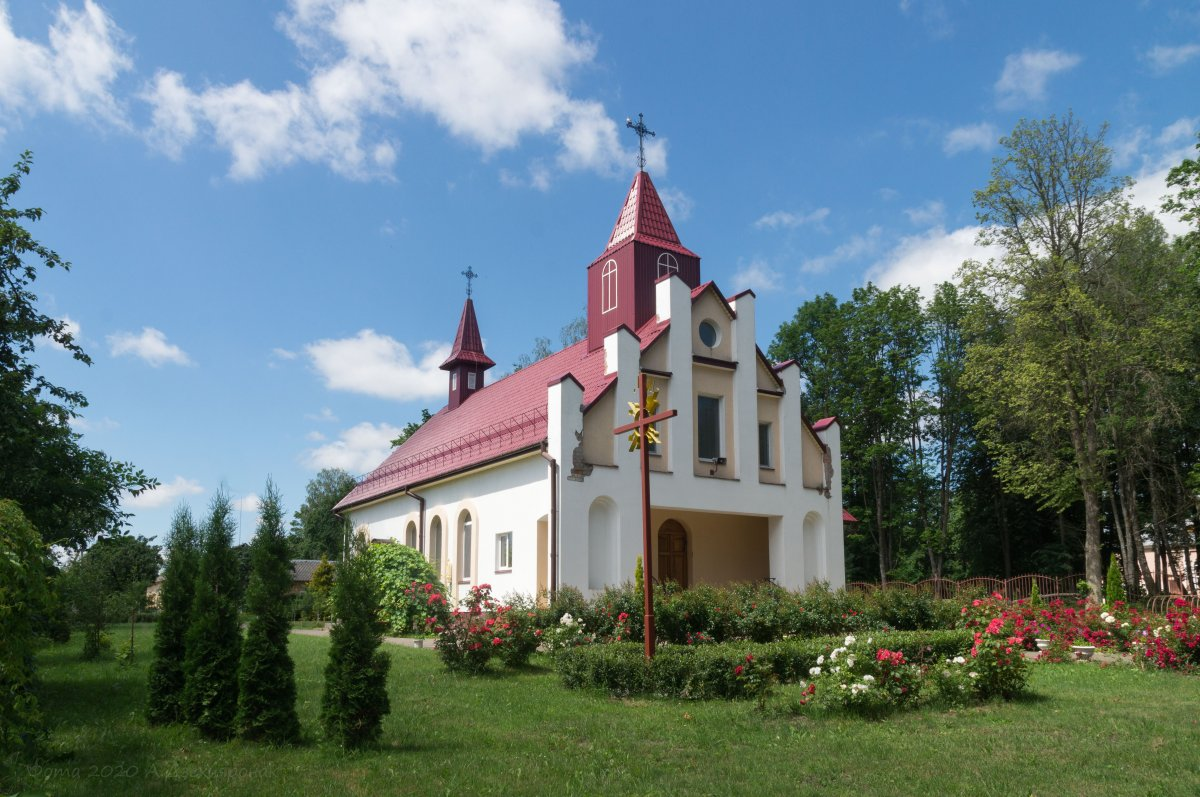

- Location within Belarus
- Coordinates: 54°13′16″N 26°36′53″E
- Country: Belarus
- Region: Minsk Region
- District: Maladzyechna District

Population (2010)
  - Total: 1,645
- Time zone: UTC+3 (MSK)

Byerazinskaye (Belarusian: Беразінскае, romanized: Bierazinskaje; Russian: Березинское, romanized: Berezinskoye) is an agrotown in Maladzyechna District, Minsk Region, Belarus. It is administratively part of Haradzilava selsoviet; it has served as its administrative center since 2008. It is located 25 kilometres (16 mi) from Maladzyechna and 106 kilometres (66 mi) from the capital Minsk. In 2010, it had a population of 1,645.
