= Knyahinin =

Agrotown in Minsk Region, Belarus

Knyahinin Княгінін (Belarusian) Княгинин (Russian)
- Agrotown
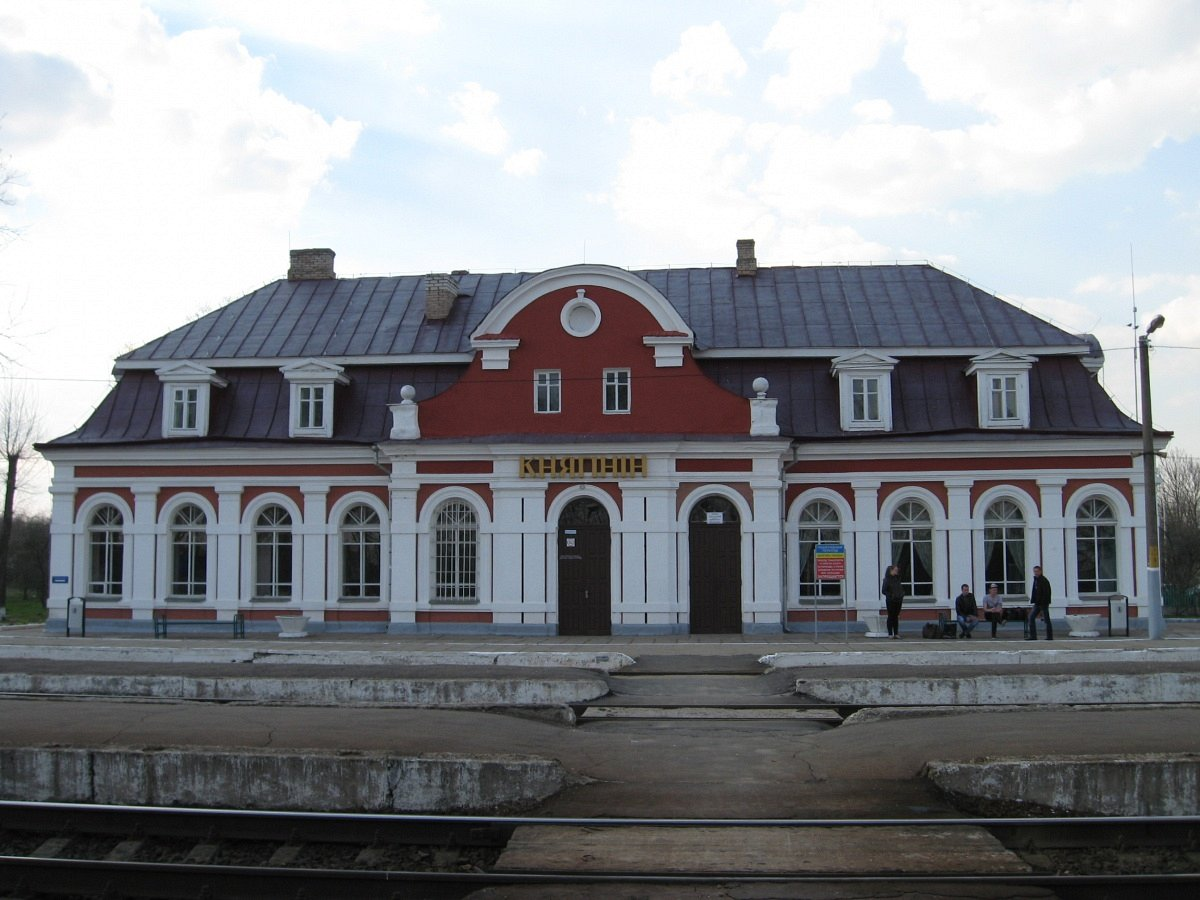

- Location within Belarus
- Coordinates: 54°40′50″N 27°10′17″E
- Country: Belarus
- Region: Minsk Region
- District: Myadzyel District

Population (2010)
  - Total: 834
- Time zone: UTC+3 (MSK)

Knyahinin (Belarusian: Княгінін, romanized: Kniahinin; Russian: Княги́нин, romanized: Knyaginin) is an agrotown in Myadzyel District, Minsk Region, Belarus. It serves as the administrative center of Knyahinin selsoviet. It is located 30 kilometres (19 mi) from Myadzyel and 100 kilometres (62 mi) from the capital Minsk. In 1998, it had a population of 1,056. In 2010, it had a population of 834.
