= Smalyany =

Agrotown in Vitebsk Region, Belarus

Smalyany Смальяны (Belarusian) Смольяны (Russian)
- Agrotown
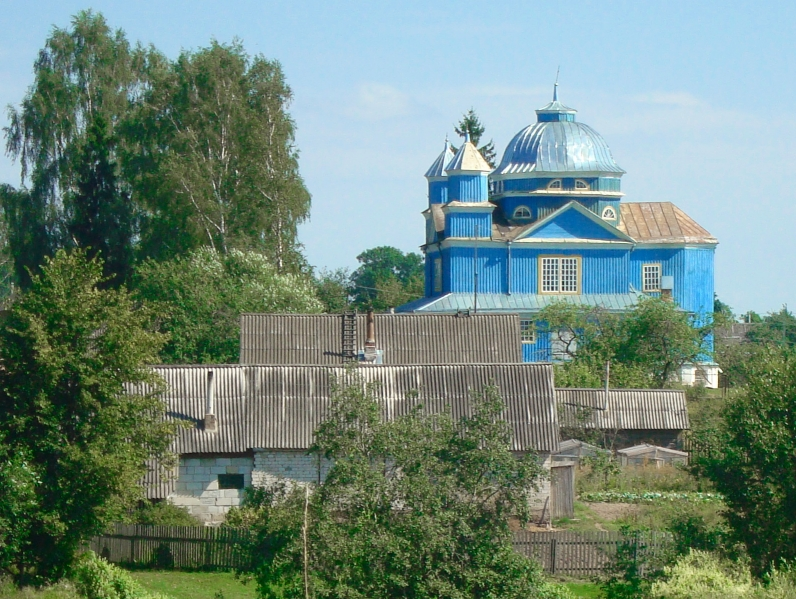

- Location within Belarus
- Coordinates: 54°36′N 30°04′E
- Country: Belarus
- Region: Vitebsk Region
- District: Orsha District
- Time zone: UTC+3 (MSK)

Smalyany (Belarusian: Смальяны, romanized: Smaĺjany; Russian: Смольяны, romanized: Smolyany) is an agrotown in Orsha District, Vitebsk Region, Belarus. It serves as the administrative center of Smalyany selsoviet. It is situated 24 kilometres (15 mi) west-northwest of Orsha.

== History ==
In 1926, 950 Jews lived in the settlement, just over half of the total population. During the German invasion of the Soviet Union, the settlement was captured by German forces of Army Group Centre on 9 July 1941. The Germans established a ghetto, possibly during the fall of 1941; the ghetto was liquidated on 5 April 1942 as a mass shooting of Jews took place. The Soviet Extraordinary State Commission (ChGK) estimated the number of victims to be 610, with a list compiled by the ChGK containing the names of 254 Jews.

== Sources ==
- Megargee, Geoffrey P.; Dean, Martin (4 May 2012). The United States Holocaust Memorial Museum Encyclopedia of Camps and Ghettos, 1933 –1945: Volume II: Ghettos in German-Occupied Eastern Europe. Indiana University Press. ISBN 978-0-253-00202-0.
