= Dashkawka, Mogilev district =

Agrotown in Mogilev Region, Belarus

Dashkawka Дашкаўка (Belarusian) Дашковка (Russian)
- Agrotown
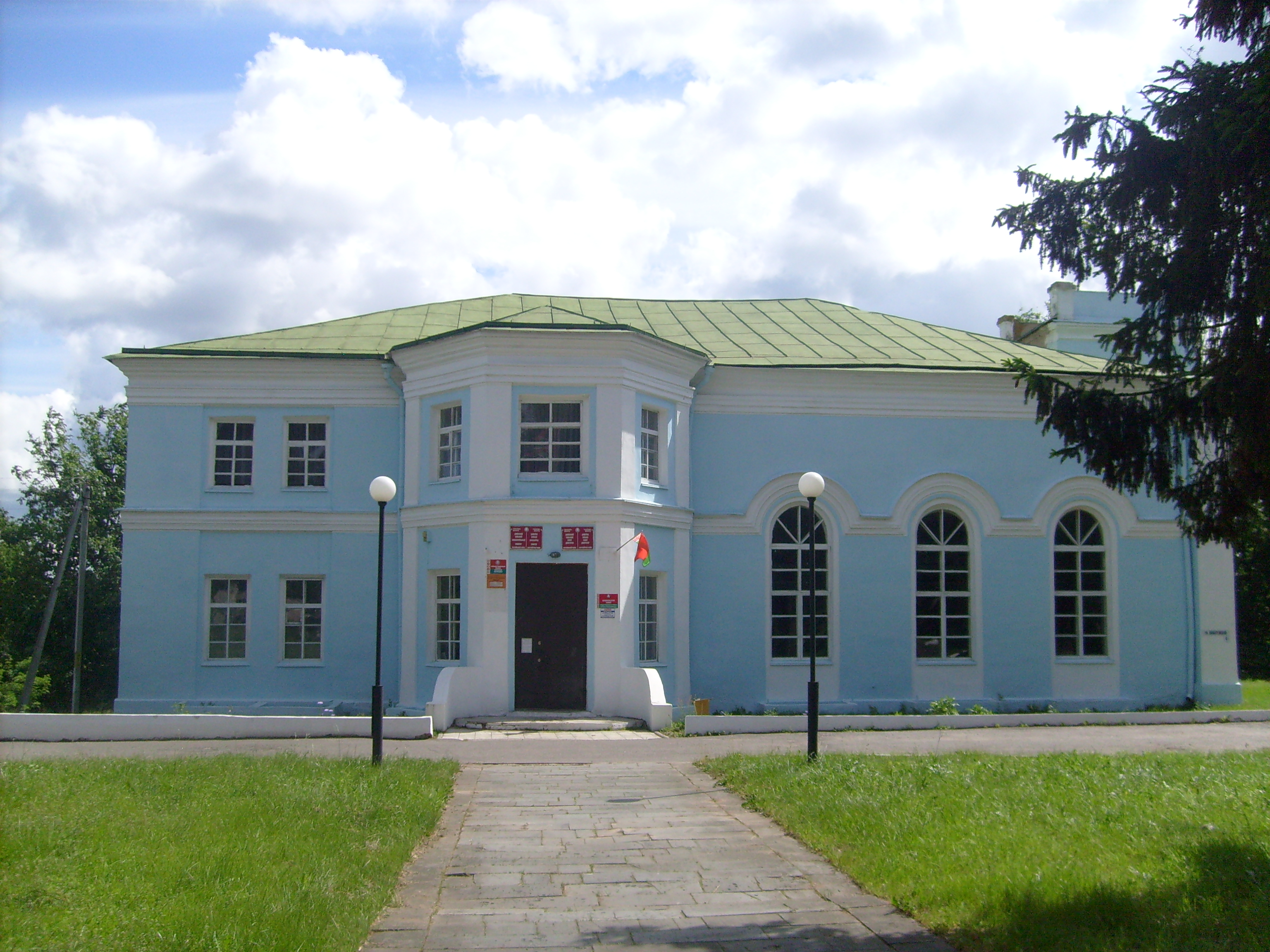

- Location within Belarus
- Coordinates: 53°44′13″N 30°15′40″E
- Country: Belarus
- Region: Mogilev Region
- District: Mogilev District
- Time zone: UTC+3 (MSK)

Dashkawka (Belarusian: Дашкаўка, romanized: Daškaŭka; Russian: Дашковка, romanized: Dashkovka) is an agrotown in Mogilev District, Mogilev Region, Belarus. It serves as the administrative center of Dashkawka selsoviet.
