= Volya, Ivatsevichy district =

Agrotown in Brest Region, Belarus

Volya Воля
- Agrotown
- Location within Belarus
- Coordinates: 52°39′44″N 25°19′26″E
- Country: Belarus
- Region: Brest Region
- District: Ivatsevichy District

Population (2015)
  - Total: 632
- Time zone: UTC+3 (MSK)

Volya (Belarusian: Воля, romanized: Volia; Russian: Воля) is an agrotown in Ivatsevichy District, Brest Region, Belarus. It is part of Zhytlin rural council (selsoviet).
