= Azyartso, Minsk region =

Agrotown in Minsk Region, Belarus

Azyartso Азярцо (Belarusian) Озерцо (Russian)
- Agrotown
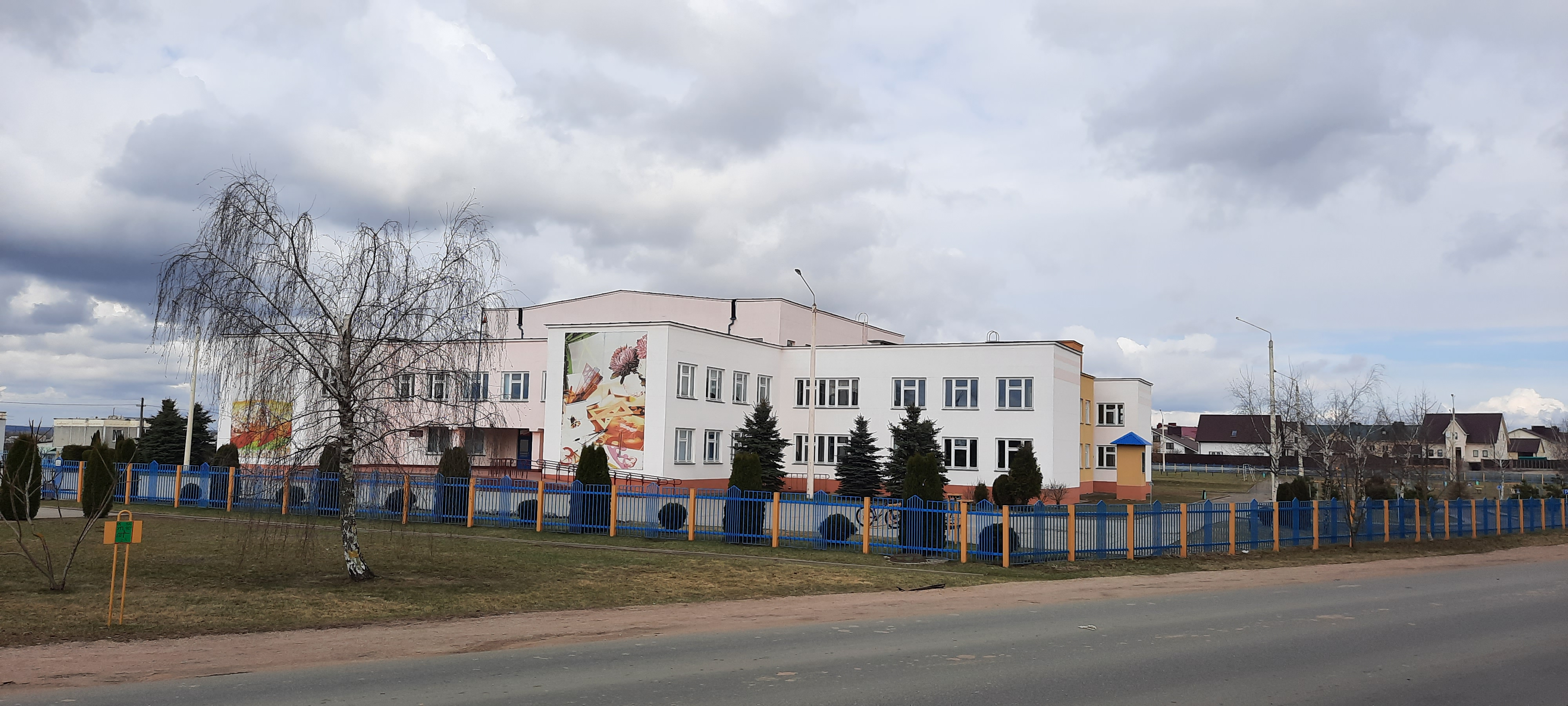

- Location within Belarus
- Coordinates: 53°50′26″N 27°23′36″E
- Country: Belarus
- Region: Minsk Region
- District: Minsk District

Population (2010)
  - Total: 1,320
- Time zone: UTC+3 (MSK)

Azyartso (Belarusian: Азярцо, romanized: Aziartso; Russian: Озерцо, romanized: Ozertso) is an agrotown in Minsk District, Minsk Region, Belarus. It is administratively part of Shchomyslitsa selsoviet. It is located four kilometres (2.5 mi) southwest of the capital Minsk. In 2010, it had a population of 1,320.
