= Lyebyedzyeva, Maladzyechna district =

Agrotown in Minsk Region, Belarus

Lyebyedzyeva Лебедзева (Belarusian) Лебедево (Russian)
- Agrotown
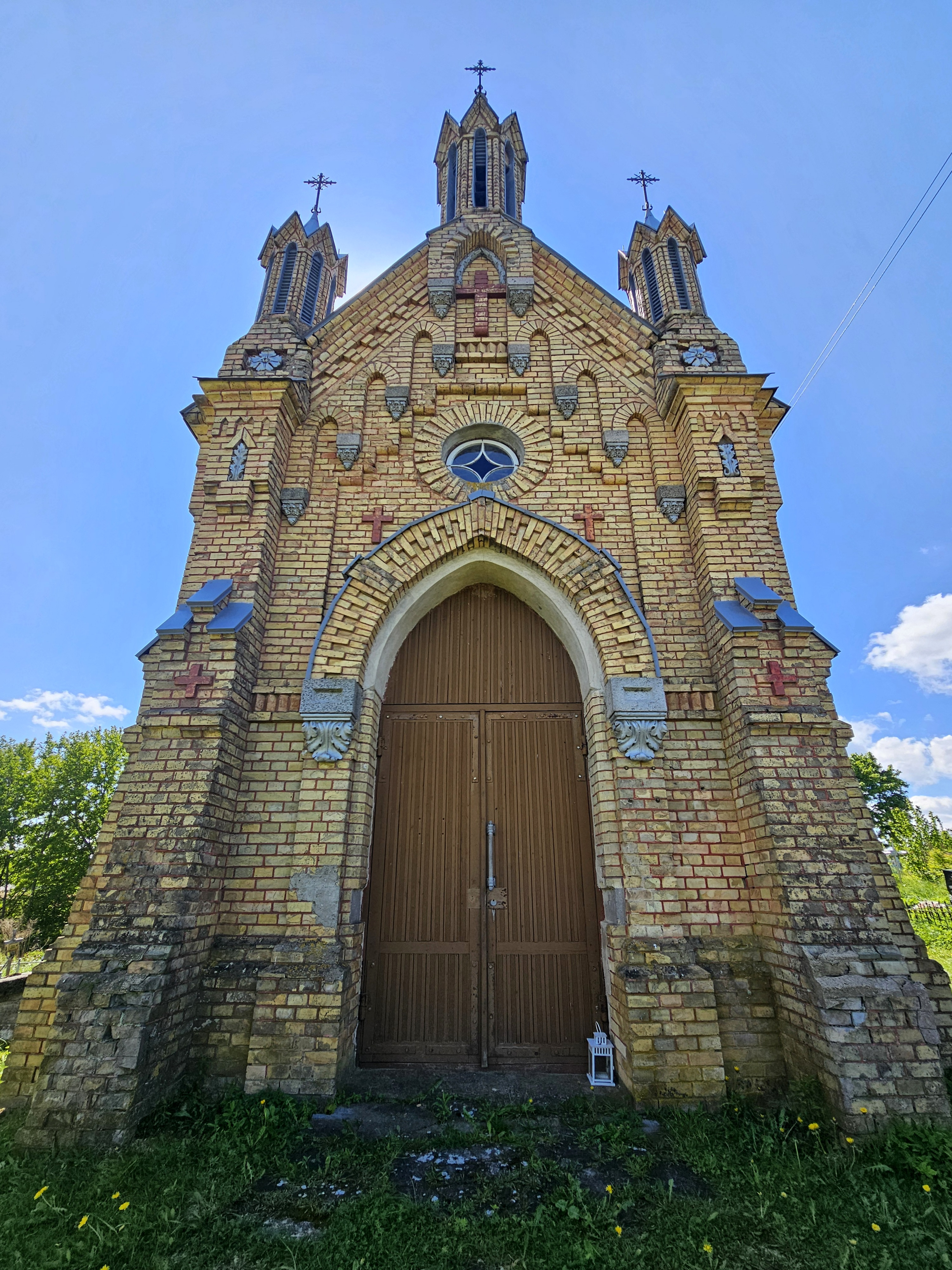

- Location within Belarus
- Coordinates: 54°18′41″N 26°42′28″E
- Country: Belarus
- Region: Minsk Region
- District: Maladzyechna District

Population (2010)
  - Total: 1,086
- Time zone: UTC+3 (MSK)

Lyebyedzyeva (Belarusian: Лебедзева, romanized: Liebiedzieva; Russian: Ле́бедево, romanized: Lebedevo) is an agrotown in Maladzyechna District, Minsk Region, Belarus. It serves as the administrative center of Lyebyedzyeva selsoviet. It is located 12 kilometres (7.5 mi) from Maladzyechna and 90 kilometres (56 mi) from the capital Minsk. In 1998, it had a population of 1,153. In 2010, it had a population of 1,086.
