= Aktsyabr, Lahoysk district =

Agrotown in Minsk Region, Belarus

Aktsyabr Акцябр (Belarusian) Октябрь (Russian)
- Agrotown
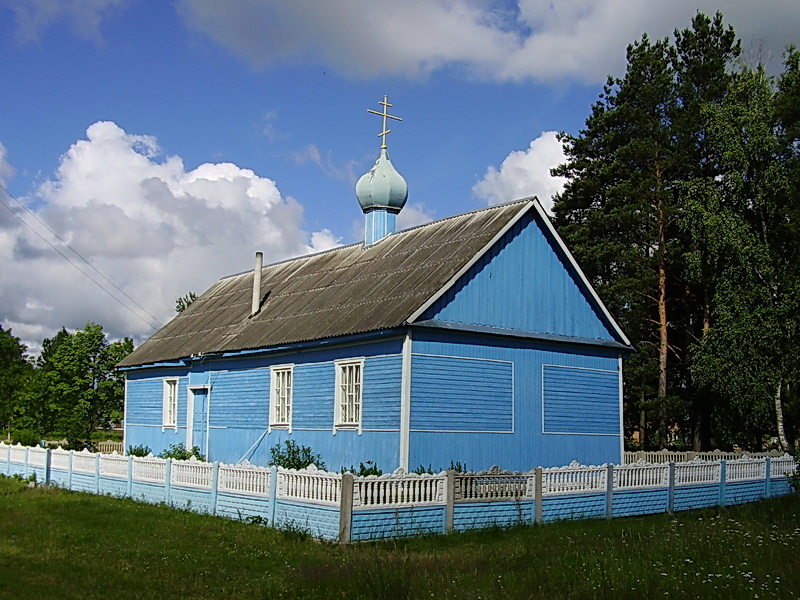

- Location within Belarus
- Coordinates: 54°25′36″N 27°44′07″E
- Country: Belarus
- Region: Minsk Region
- District: Lahoysk District

Population (2010)
  - Total: 635
- Time zone: UTC+3 (MSK)

Aktsyabr (Belarusian: Акцябр, romanized: Akciabr; Russian: Октябрь, romanized: Oktyabr), previously known as Khatayevichy (Note: Belarusian: Хатаевічы, romanized: Chatajevičy; Russian: Хотаевичи, romanized: Khotayevichi.) until 1939, is an agrotown in Lahoysk District, Minsk Region, Belarus. It serves as the administrative center of Aktsyabr selsoviet. It is located 34 kilometres (21 mi) from Lahoysk and 74 kilometres (46 mi) from the capital Minsk. In 2010, it had a population of 635.
