= Kosawka =

Agrotown in Minsk Region, Belarus

Kosawka Косаўка (Belarusian) Косовка (Russian)
- Agrotown
- Location within Belarus
- Coordinates: 53°47′N 29°02′E
- Country: Belarus
- Region: Minsk Region
- District: Byerazino District
- Time zone: UTC+3 (MSK)

Kosawka (Belarusian: Косаўка, romanized: Kosaŭka; Russian: Косовка, romanized: Kosovka) is an agrotown in Byerazino District, Minsk Region, Belarus. It is part of Kaplantsy selsoviet. It is located south of Byerazino.

== Sources ==
- Kosawka at GEOnet Names Server
