= Urechcha =

Urban-type settlement in Minsk Region, Belarus

Urechcha Урэчча (Belarusian) Уречье (Russian)
- Urban-type settlement
- Location within Belarus
- Coordinates: 52°56′43″N 27°53′54″E
- Country: Belarus
- Region: Minsk Region
- District: Lyuban District

Population (2026)
  - Total: 2,264
- Time zone: UTC+3 (MSK)

Urechcha (Belarusian: Урэчча, romanized: Urečča; Russian: Уречье, romanized: Urechye) is an urban-type settlement in Lyuban District, Minsk Region, Belarus. It serves as the administrative center of Urechcha selsoviet. It is located 24 kilometres (15 mi) from Lyuban and 177 kilometres (110 mi) from the capital Minsk. Population: 3,165 (2011); 2,372 (2023); 2,291 (2025); 2,264 (2026).
