= Narach =

Narach or Naroch (Belarusian: Нарач; Russian: Нарочь) may refer to:

- Narach (lake), Belarus
- Narach (resort settlement), Belarus
- Narach (agrotown), Belarus
- Narach (river), Belarus

== See also ==
- Narachanski National Park, Belarus
- Narak (disambiguation)
