= Myadzyel =

Town in Minsk Region, Belarus

Myadzyel Мядзел (Belarusian) Мядель (Russian) Myadel
- Town
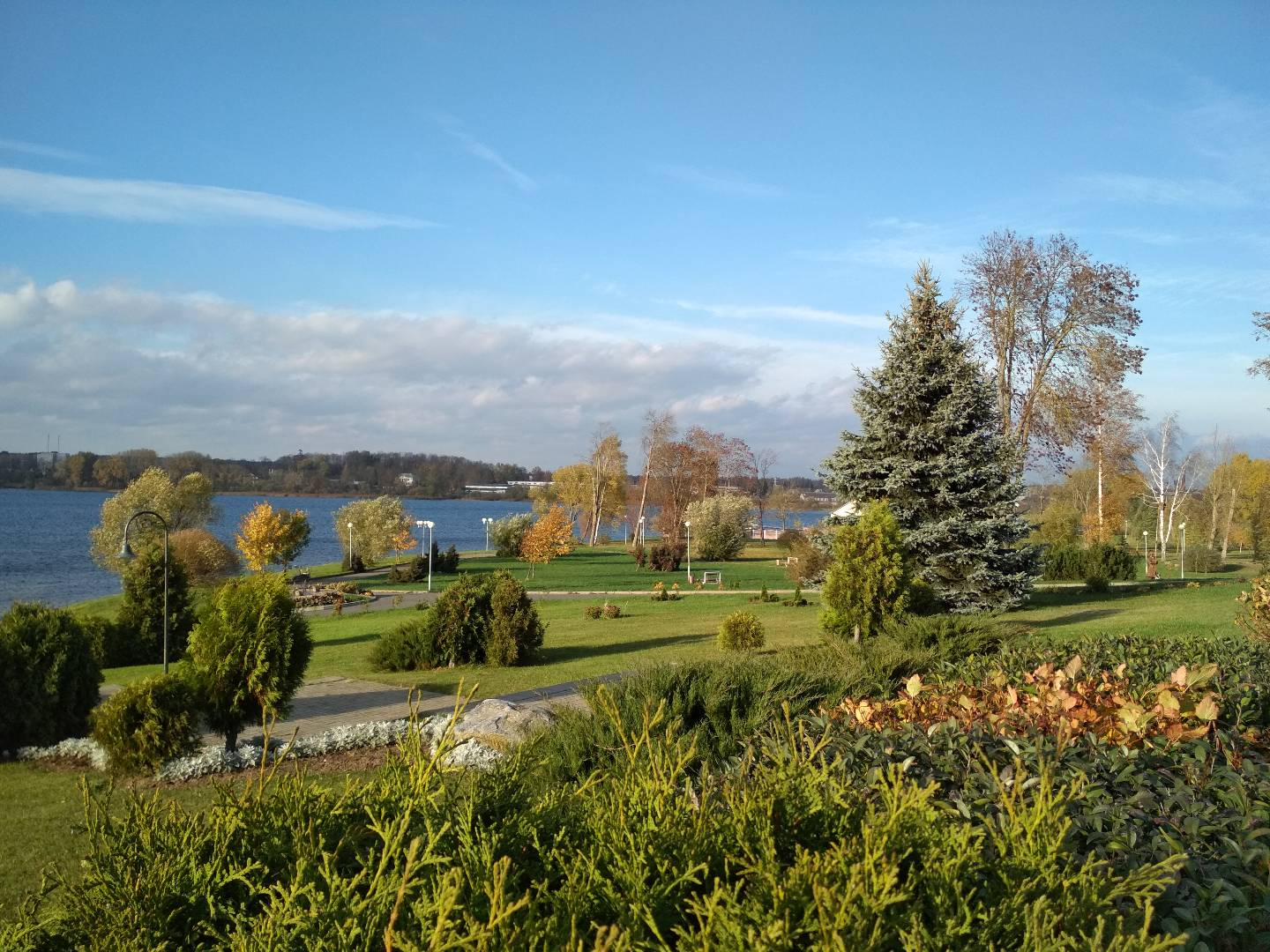

- Flag Coat of arms

- Location within Belarus Location within Europe
- Coordinates: 54°52′N 26°56′E
- Country: Belarus
- Region: Minsk Region
- District: Myadzyel District

Population (2026)
  - Total: 6,822
- Time zone: UTC+3 (MSK)
- Postal code: 222380
- Area code: +375 1797
- License plate: 5

Myadzyel or Myadel (Note: Belarusian: Мядзел, romanized: Miadziel, IPA: [ˈmʲadzʲel]; Russian: Мя́дель, romanized: Myadel; Polish: Miadzioł; Lithuanian: Medilas.) is a town in Minsk Region, Belarus. It serves as the administrative centre of Myadzyel District. Myadzyel is located on the eastern shore of Lake Miastra, part of the Narach lake group in Narachanski National Park. As of 2026, it has a population of 6,822.

== History ==
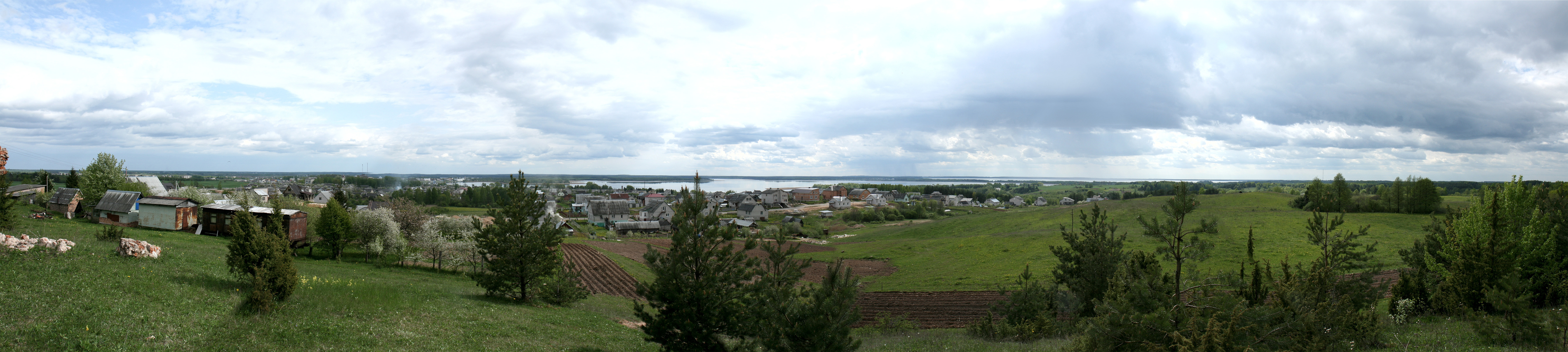

The name of the town is of Uralic origin, specifically of Finno-Ugric heritage connected with Estonian mänd "pine" and Finnish mänty.

Initially, the fortified wooden settlement of Myadzyel was located on the largest island of Lake Myadzyel, where the remains of the fortifications are still preserved today. Probably in the XI century Myadzyel was a border town of the Polotsk land.

In written sources, Myadzyel was first mentioned in 1325 in a Latin-language letter of Grand Duke Gediminas to the Archbishop of Riga, in which he complained about the actions of the brother-knights of the Teutonic Order.

For unknown reasons, the settlement was moved to the northeastern coast of Lake Myastra. By the middle of the XV century the town of Myadzyel was already divided into Old (northern part) and New (southern part) Myadzyel.

New Myadzyel was surrounded by a rampart. On the peninsula of Myastra Lake in the 16th century there was a stone grand-ducal ("royal") Myadzyel castle (the ruins have been preserved). According to some reports, the inhabitants of New Myadzyel received Magdeburg rights from Sigismund I the Old at the request of his wife Bona Sforza.

Within the Grand Duchy of Lithuania, Myadzyel was part of Vilnius Voivodeship. On February 8, 1659, the Battle of Myadel occurred near Myadzyel. In 1754 the Baroque Church of Saint Mary was founded by Antoniy Koshitz. In 1793, Myadzyel was acquired by the Russian Empire in the course of the Second Partition of Poland.

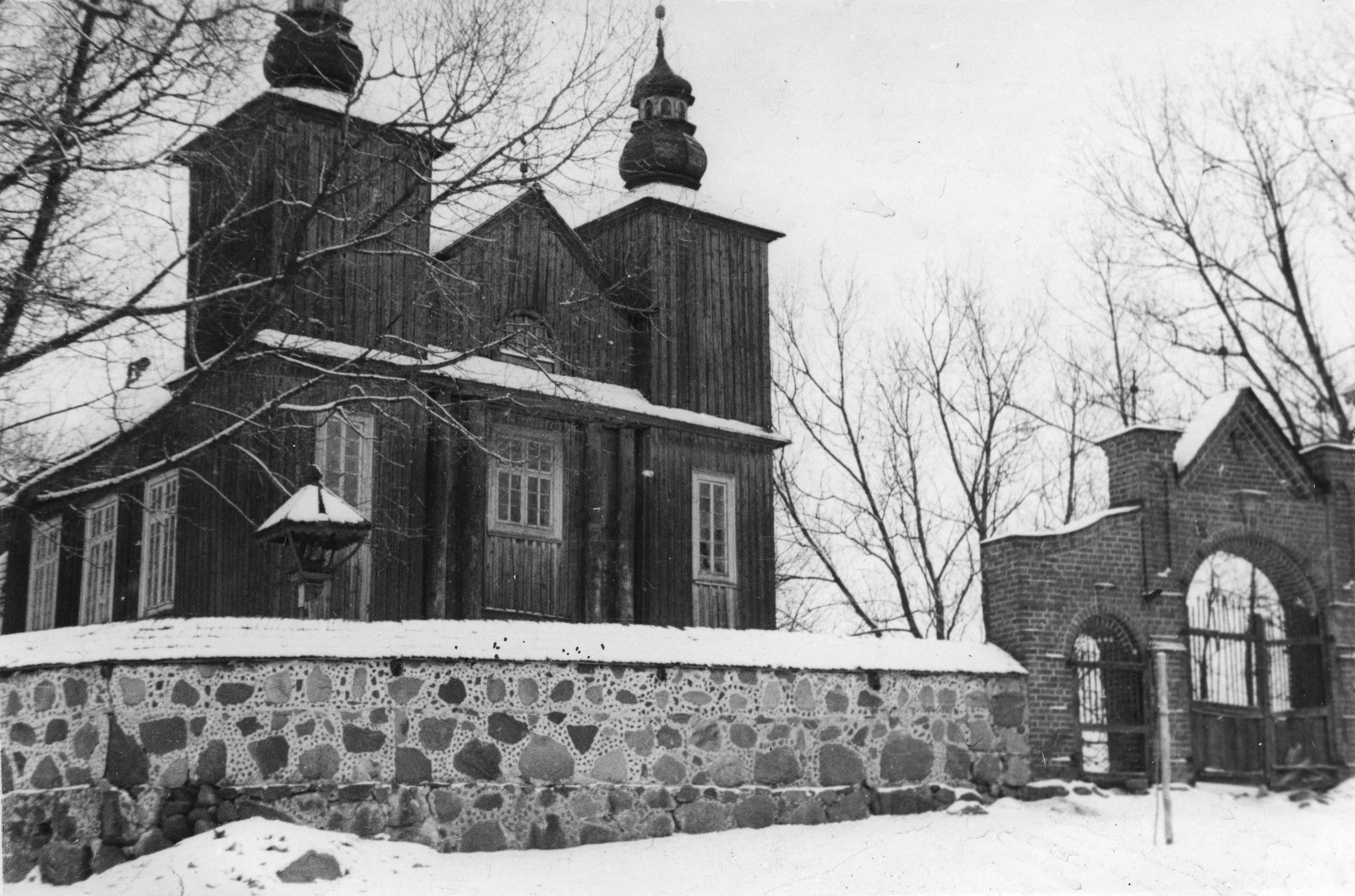
Saint Stanislaus church in the 1930s

From 1921 until 1939, Myadzel (Miadzioł) was part of the Second Polish Republic. According to the 1921 census, the population of Miadzioł Nowy ("New Miadzioł") was 80.7% Polish, 17.5% Belarusian, 1.1% Jewish, and the population of Miadzioł Stary ("Old Miadzioł") was 36.3% Polish, 35.8% Belarusian, 18.4% Jewish (combined 70.4% Polish, 21.7% Belarusian, 5.1% Jewish).

In September 1939, the town was occupied by the Red Army and, on 14 November 1939, incorporated into the Byelorussian SSR. From 2 July 1941 until 4 July 1944, Myadzyel was occupied by Nazi Germany and administered as a part of the Generalbezirk Weißruthenien of Reichskommissariat Ostland.

== Bibliography ==
- Megargee, Geoffrey P.; Dean, Martin (4 May 2012). The United States Holocaust Memorial Museum Encyclopedia of Camps and Ghettos, 1933 –1945: Volume II: Ghettos in German-Occupied Eastern Europe. Indiana University Press. pp. 1146–1148. ISBN 978-0-253-00202-0.
