= Narach (agrotown) =

Narach Нарач (Belarusian) Нарочь (Russian)
- Agrotown
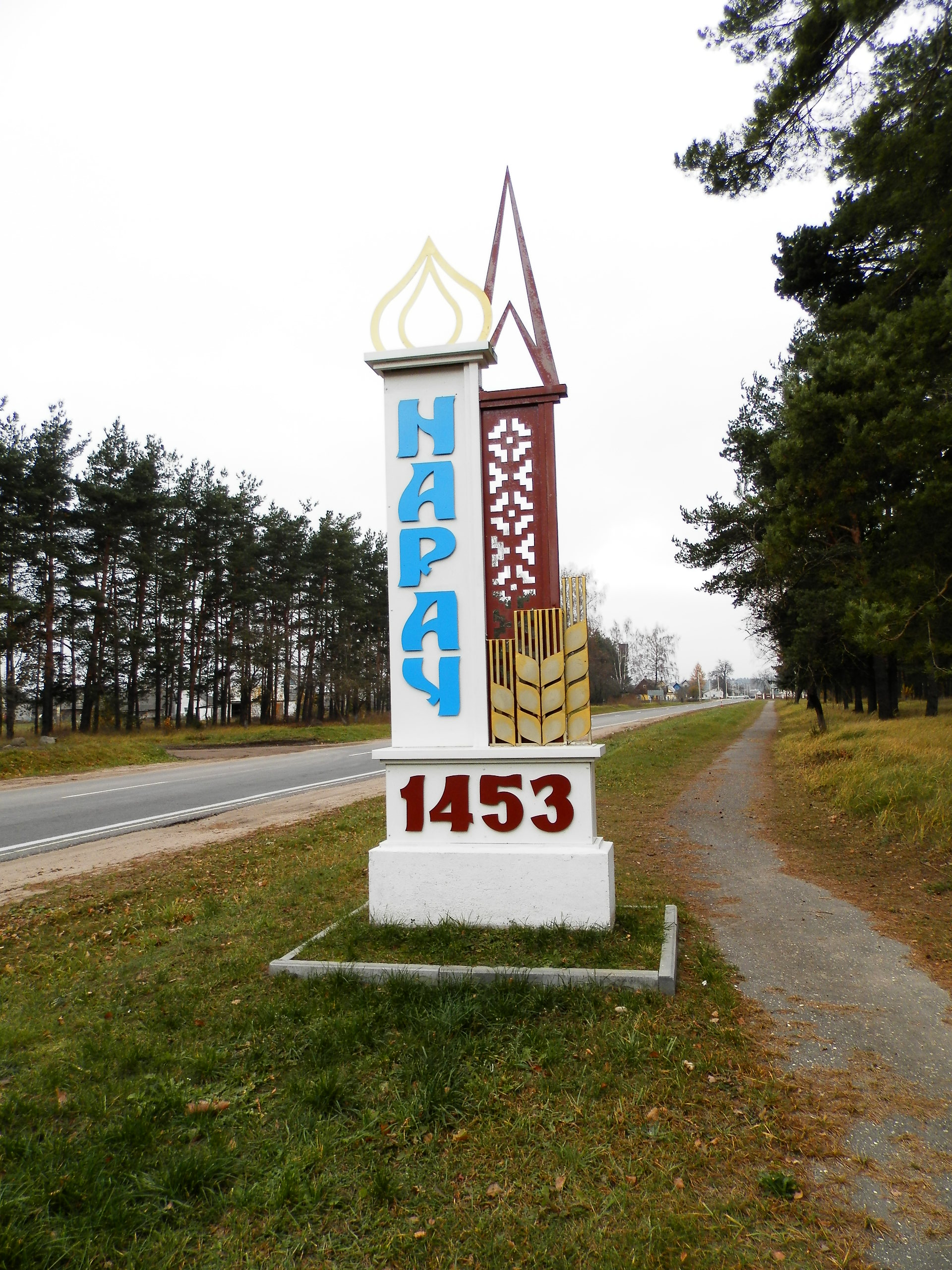

- Location within Belarus
- Coordinates: 54°56′01″N 26°41′19″E
- Country: Belarus
- Region: Minsk Region
- District: Myadzyel District

Population (2006)
  - Total: ~3,400
- Time zone: UTC+3 (MSK)

Narach (Belarusian: На́рач; Russian: На́рочь, romanized: Naroch; Lithuanian: Naročius), previously known as Kabylnik (Belarusian: Кабыльнік) or Kobylnik (Russian: Кобыльник) until 1964, is an agrotown (since 2005) in Myadzyel District, Minsk Region, Belarus. It is situated by Lake Narach.

It is the birthplace of Maria Kaczyńska, who was the First Lady of Poland from 2005 until her death in 2010.

== Religion ==
=== Churches ===
- Church of Saint Andrew Babola
