= Bobr (urban-type settlement) =

Urban-type settlement in Minsk Region, Belarus

Bobr Бобр
- Urban-type settlement
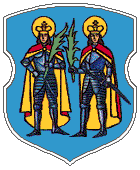
- Coat of arms

- Location within Belarus
- Coordinates: 54°20′32″N 29°16′31″E
- Country: Belarus
- Region: Minsk Region
- District: Krupki District

Population (2026)
  - Total: 855
- Time zone: UTC+3 (MSK)

Bobr (Belarusian: Бобр; Russian: Бобр) is an urban-type settlement in Krupki District, Minsk Region, Belarus. It is located 10 kilometres (6.2 mi) from Krupki and 131 kilometres (81 mi) from the capital Minsk. In 2010, it had a population of 1,110. As of 2026, it has a population of 855.
