= Ukhvala rural council =

Ukhvala rural council is a lower-level subdivision (selsoviet) of Krupki district, Minsk region, Belarus.
