= Pasyomkavichy =

Village in Minsk Region, Belarus

Pasyomkavichy Пасёмкавічы (Belarusian)
- Village
- Location within Belarus
- Coordinates: 54°37′N 29°04′E
- Country: Belarus
- Region: Minsk Region
- District: Krupki District
- Elevation: 163 m (535 ft)

Population (2019)
  - Total: 12
- Time zone: UTC+3 (MSK)
- Postal code: 222033
- Area code: +375 1796
- License plate: 5

Pasyomkavichy or Posemkovichi (Belarusian: Пасёмкавічы, romanized: Pasiomkavičy; Russian: Посёмковичи, romanized: Posyomkovichi) is a village in Krupki District, Minsk Region, Belarus.
