= Khalopyenichy rural council =

Khalopyenichy rural council is a lower-level subdivision (selsoviet) of Krupki district, Minsk region, Belarus.
