= Ihrushka rural council =

Ihrushka rural council is a lower-level subdivision (selsoviet) of Krupki district, Minsk region, Belarus.
