= Svatki rural council =

Svatki rural council is a lower-level subdivision (selsoviet) of Myadzyel district, Minsk region, Belarus.
