= Zanarach rural council =

Subdivision of Myadzyel district, Belarus

Zanarach rural council is a lower-level subdivision (selsoviet) of Myadzyel district, Minsk region, Belarus.
