= Aktsyabrski, Krupki district rural council =

Aktsyabrski rural council is a lower-level subdivision (selsoviet) of Krupki district, Minsk region, Belarus.
