= Slabada, Myadzyel district rural council =

Slabada rural council is a lower-level subdivision (selsoviet) of Myadzyel district, Minsk region, Belarus.
