= Khatsiukhova rural council =

Khatsiukhova rural council is a lower-level subdivision (selsoviet) of Krupki district, Minsk region, Belarus.
