= Bobr rural council =

Bobr rural council is a lower-level subdivision (selsoviet) of Krupki district, Minsk region, Belarus.

== Rural localities ==
The populations are from the 2009 Belarusian census and 2019 Belarusian census

Populations of rural localities in 2009 and 2019
Russian name	Belarusian name	Pop. 2009	Pop. 2019
Бобрский сельсовет	Бобрскі сельсавет	2586	2144
гп Бобр	гп Бобр	1118	928
д Ольшаники	в Альшанікі	-	4
п Бобр	п Бобр	392	324
д Боровец	в Баравец	6	8
д Великий Лес	в Вялікі Лес	56	56
д Виктолино	в Віктоліна	2	-
д Дворище	в Дворышча	53	45
д Долгое	в Доўгае	13	9
д Еленка	в Еленка	-	-
д Ерошовка	в Ярашоўка	10	4
д Заболотское	в Забалоцкае	-	5
аг Замки	аг Замкі	599	554
д Кленовичи	в Кляновічы	18	17
д Колос	в Колас	10	2
д Красновка	в Красноўка	10	10
д Куты	в Куты	16	5
д Липовец	в Ліпавец	8	3
д Мочулище	в Мачулішча	14	12
д Мерецкий Двор	в Мярэцкі Двор	2	2
д Навесы	в Навесы	17	13
д Новосёлки	в Навасёлкі	-	-
д Осово	в Восава	5	4
д Плиса	в Пліса	80	42
д Подсосенка	в Падсосенка	6	-
д Синиченка	в Сінічанка	15	12
д Скаковка	в Скакоўка	21	11
д Соколовичи	в Сакалавічы	77	51
д Стаи	в Стаі	3	2
д Старый Бобр	в Стары Бобр	30	14
д Чернявка	в Чарняўка	2	2
д Шатьки	в Шацькі	3	5
