= Norman Narotzky =

American & Spanish artist

Norman Narotzky (born 1928, Brooklyn, New York City) is an American and Spanish artist living in Barcelona, Spain. His work addresses social issues and the style varies from abstractionism to figurative painting and transitional styles.

== Biography and work ==
Narotzky's father, Harry Aaron Narotzky migrated to the US from the village of Kabylnik (now Narach, Belarus) in 1907. Almost all family remaining in Kabylnik perished during WWII, massacred by the Nazi. Narotzky's mother was an immigrant from Ukraine and worked as a seamstress.

At the age of thirteen, Narotzky was accepted into the High School of Music and Art in New York City from which he graduated in 1945. During this time, he studied on weekends in the studio of Moses Soyer, together with a group of classmates: Harvey Dinnerstein, Burton Silverman, Murray Stern and Herbert Steinberg. He continued his art education at Brooklyn College, where one of his professors was Ad Reinhardt, receiving his BA in 1949. At the same time, he attended the Art Students League of New York. Subsequently, he began working at a Graphic Design Studio and studying at the Cooper Union Art School.

In 1953, Narotzky was drafted into the US Army. He was assigned to the Graphic Arts Section of the Medical Field Service School, in Texas, where he made illustrations. At the end of his service, in 1954, he won a Woolley Foundation Grant to study art in Paris where he worked at Atelier 17, a renowned printmaking space.

He spent the summer of 1955 painting in the village of Cadaqués in Spain and then continued his stay in Paris for a second year with a French government Fellowship. In 1956 a Fulbright Program Fellowship brought him to the Academy of Fine Arts, in Munich. In 1957, he returned to New York City to paint and study art history at the New York City Graduate School. In 1958 Narotzky moved to Barcelona.

== Topics and styles ==
Narotzky works mostly in painting but has also created prints throughout his career, one of which earned the Philadelphia Museum of Art Purchase Prize in 1956. In the late 1950s, his work was a form of abstract expressionism, inspired by the light and colors of the Costa Brava. In the early 1960s, his brushstrokes fused into large areas of color suggesting the human figure. These paintings were exhibited at the VI São Paulo Art Biennial, Brazil, in 1961, and one of them was included in "Recent Painting USA: the Figure” at the MOMA, New York, in 1962. In the mid 1960s the images became more concrete, representing historical and popular figures of the US and Spain. In a solo show in 1967 at the Galería René Metras in Barcelona, he exhibited a double portrait of Queen Isabella I of Castile and King Ferdinand II of Aragon, known as “Los Reyes Católicos", criticising their support of the Spanish Inquisition. These paintings were a protest raising awareness about all religious, racial, and political persecution throughout history, taking the Spanish Inquisition as a point of departure. When news of this reached the authorities in Madrid, it created an uproar in the Franco government, which considered it to be a direct attack on its ideology.

In the 1970s, Narotzky created a series of paintings entitled "Images of Life and Death", provoked by the Vietnam War, the civil rights movement, and the anti-war protests. The images denounce violence and destruction and celebrate the hope for life and love. Following this, in the 1980s he returned to nature for inspiration. "Living Landscapes" portray the Catalan mountains and coastal landscapes as potent living forms. He continued this search by painting the cityscapes of Barcelona and New York, focusing on the anthropomorphic architectural details which are frequently overlooked by the passers-by. In the series "Chimeneas de l’Empordà" he focused on the expressive "physiognomy" of chimneys in the old buildings of the region.

In 2014, Narotzky began his latest series of paintings, "Ocaso" ("sunset" in Spanish). It also means decadence, decline, end and death. It is a figurative warning to humanity about the fragility of existence and the threat of self-destruction through wars, terrorism and the continuing damage to the earth and the environment.

Narotzky has had over 60 solo shows and numerous group exhibitions. His works are included, among others, in the collections of the Philadelphia Museum of Art, the Mills College Art Museum, the Cincinnati Art Museum, the Stavanger Museum in Norway, the Museo Nacional Centro de Arte Reina Sofía ("Queen Sofia National Museum Art Centre") in Madrid, the National Art Museum of Catalonia and the James A. Michener Collection in the Blanton Museum of Art in Austin, Texas.

== Family ==
Narotzky's wife Mercedes Molleda is a retired geography and history professor and an art critic. The couple has two daughters and two grandsons.

== External images ==
- Participation in an exhibition in Museum of Modern Art, New York.
