= Syalyava =

Lake in Minsk Region, Belarus

Syalyava Сялява Селява
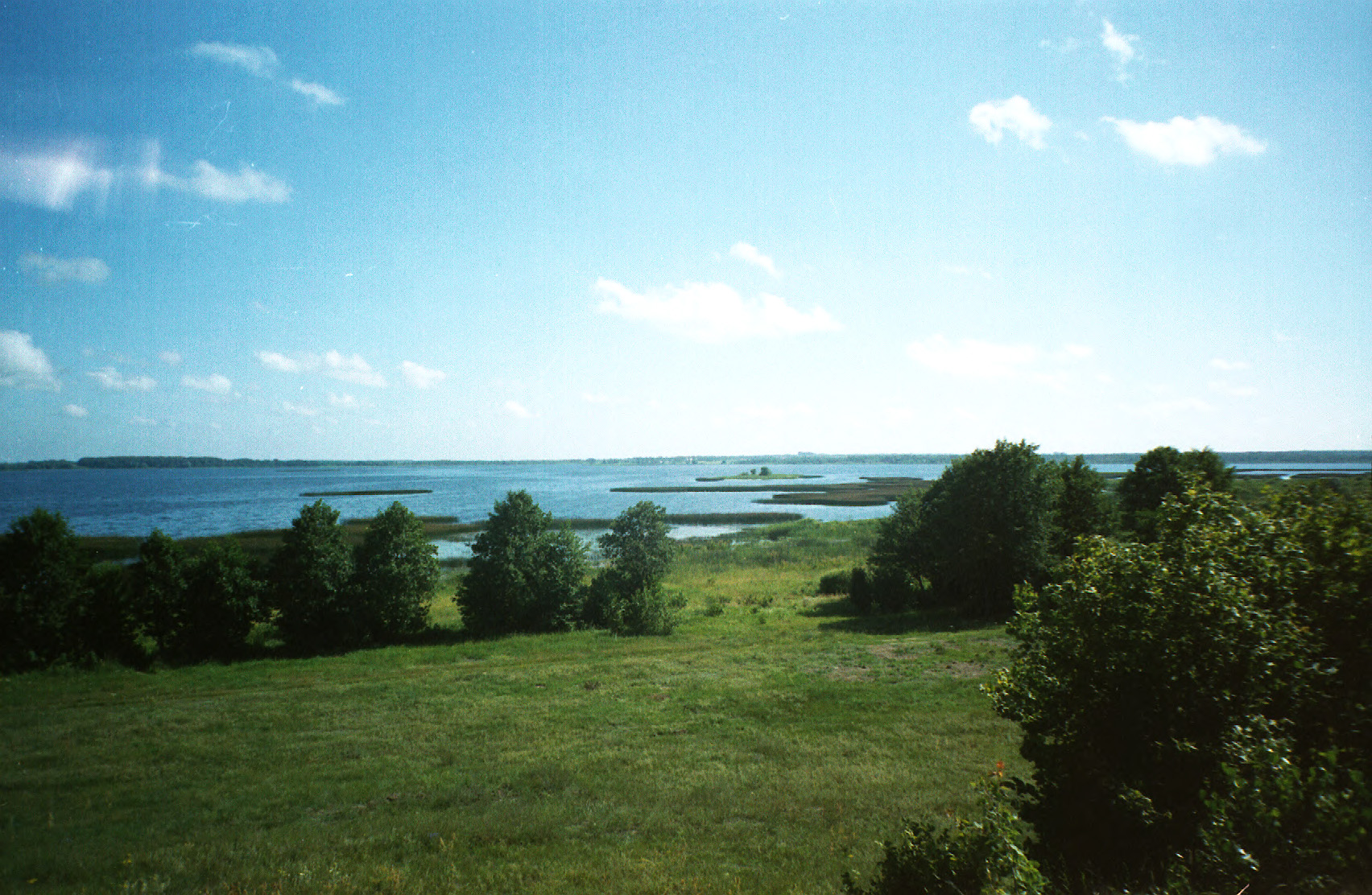

- Location within Belarus
- Location: Minsk Region
- Coordinates: 54°33′03″N 29°08′38″E
- Basin countries: Belarus
- Max. length: 14.4 km (8.9 mi)
- Max. width: 2.5 km (1.6 mi)
- Surface area: 15 km^{2} (5.8 sq mi)
- Average depth: 6.3 m (21 ft)
- Max. depth: 17.6 m (58 ft)
- Water volume: 94.8 million cubic metres (3.35×10^{9} cu ft)
- Shore length^{1}: 44.3 km (27.5 mi)
- ^{1} Shore length is not a well-defined measure.

Syalyava or Selyava (Belarusian: Сялява; Russian: Селява) is a lake in Krupki District, Minsk Region, Belarus. It is located 20 km from Krupki.

== Geography ==
Ribbon lake Syalyava is located on a lowland, gently undulating terrain, among moraine hills with slopes of 6–8 m high, in the north descending to a height of 3–5 m. The shores of the lake are sandy, partly in the north, they gently slope towards the water (in the south, they smoothly merge into the slopes of the nearby hills); overgrown with shrubs or forest, wetlands near the inlet of watercourses (especially in the north-west). The catchment area of the lake - with an area of 324 km^{2} - is largely arable land, only about a quarter of it is covered with forest.

The reservoir is irregularly shaped and stretches along the north–south axis. It consists of a larger northern body of water and a long, winding southern bay. Its total length is about 15 km, and the maximum width is appr. 3 km. The coastline is very diversified, 44.3 km long. Lake bottom has a complex structure. The shallow zone is relatively narrow, the deep water zones alternate with the shallows. The deepest point (17.6 m) is located in the south-western part of the main reservoir. A northern body of water with an average depth of 4–8 m, with shallow, numerous peninsulas and three islands. The largest of them, with an area of approx. 2 km^{2}, in the past was connected to the mainland from the west by a sandy dyke. Currently, this embankment is below the surface of the water, the depth of which, however, allows it to be reached on foot (in the 1990s the maximum depth at this point was estimated at 2.2 m). The southern body of water is narrower and deeper. The bottom of the lake to a depth of 4-6 and sometimes 10 m is covered with sandy and sand-gravel sediments, also with a layer of clay; below the aforementioned limit covered with sapropel. The content of organic matter in the bottom sediments is up to 27%.

Sielawa is located in the basin of Dvina, in the basin of the river Łukomka, it has the character of flow-through lake. It is fed by five streams and two small rivers, the Rakitouka (to the east) and the Vysokaya (to the south). In the west, the lake is connected with Lake Chudawiec by a 500-meter canal, and in the north, it gives the waters to Lake Abida by a wide fistula. After the construction of a small hydroelectric power plant on the Juhna River in 1965 (starting in Lake Abida and flowing nearby to Łukomka, flowing from Lake Lukomlskoye), the water level in Syalyava rose by about 1 m. This led to flooding of the coastal vegetation strip, but the extent of waterlogging was limited due to the relatively high relative heights and steepness of the banks (especially in the southern part).

The water in the lake is relatively clean, with a transparency of 2–3 m (in the 1980s). The structure of the bottom of the reservoir, including the occurring depths, significantly reduce water mixing and its heating outside upper layers (anothermia). Water reaction is close to neutral, slightly alkaline at the surface. The total salinity is about 200 mg / dm³.

There are a number of villages on the shore of the lake, among them Janauszczyna, Barki, Chudawa and Starożyszcza.

== Flora and fauna ==
The reservoir is eutrophic. Initial phytoplankton research conducted in the 1980s showed the presence of 57 species of algae and cyanobacteria (the amount of biomass 38.5 g / m³). Water blooms occur in the summer.

The flora includes 578 plant species, including 11 rare and endangered species entered into the Red Book of Belarus (including spotted crow, European flower, tile gladiolus, water lily, fine water lily, bilberry willow, small-fruited cranberry, small flowered sedge). Along the shores of the lake there is a narrow, intermittent strip of sedges, reeds and rushes and, in marshy regions, calamus. In the depths there are knotweed, tolls, and moat. Further overgrowth is prevented by the small width of the littoral belt of 20–80 m (up to a depth of 2–2.5 m).

The number of zoobenthos representatives in 1983 was estimated at 34 species (1.7 g / m³). The dominant group are rowers, which in the 1980s accounted for 62% of the total biomass volume. The most common species of zooplankton is daphnia (water flea), which is the food of the fish found in the reservoir. The benthic fauna is represented by bloodworms, oligochaetes and molluscs (2.72 g / m^{2}).

Rich ichthyofauna is represented by 19 species; zander, bream, perch, roach, pike, silver bream, bleak, burbot and tench are numerous. Birds are represented by 142 species. There are 40 species of mammals, 10 species of amphibians and 5 species of reptiles in the area. From among those mentioned, 20 are included in the Belarusian Red Book (osprey, gadożer, greater spotted eagle, lesser spotted eagle, bittern, little bittern, black stork, baguette, nap, kestrel, hazelnut, brown bear, badger).

== Nature protection ==
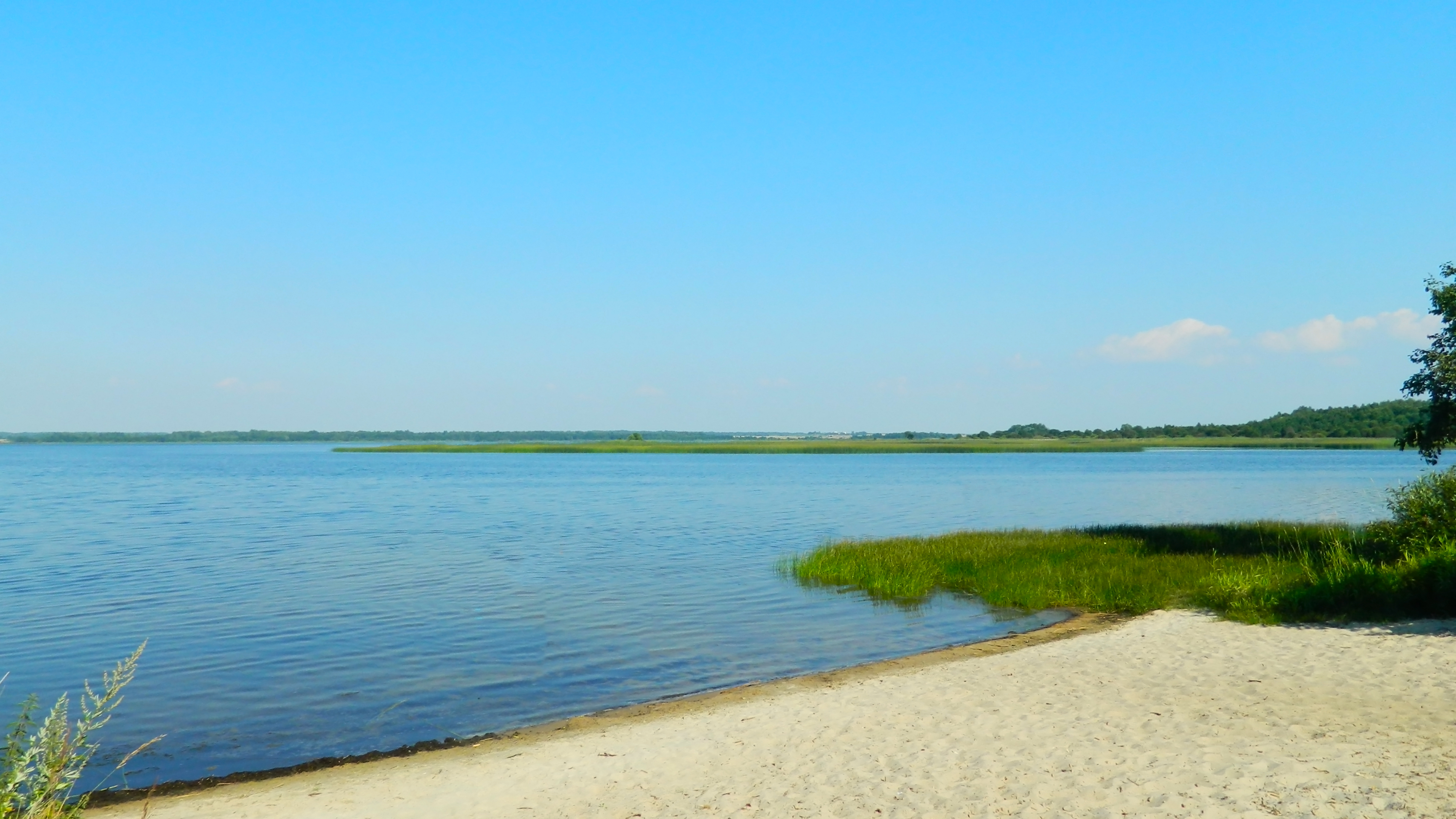
Selyava

In 1999, the area of the lake and its vicinity were placed under the protection of the newly created landscape reserve "Selyava". Its area is 19,364.83 ha. In order to achieve the objectives of nature protection, ecological education and sustainable tourism, the reserve has several educational and hiking trails, and a number of recreational facilities, educational campaigns are also conducted.

== History ==
On the largest island of the lake (proper name: Выспа, Wyspa) there is an archaeological site with traces of settlement from the Chalcolithic and Neolithic periods (6th-1st centuries BCE) and from the next millennium (1st – 8th centuries CE). Two smelting furnaces, ritual burial sites, amulets, ornaments, jewelry, fragments of bronze vessels and flint tools were found there. In addition, a number of Byzantine and Scandinavian coins were excavated from the ground among the remains from the 9th – 11th centuries. The finds are in the Krupski historical and sightseeing museum.

There was also a palace on the island, already in ruins at the end of the 19th century.

There is a local legend that on August 28, 1942, a Pe-8 bomber with 4 tons of gold crashed into the lake; gold supposed to be transported to Great Britain as a prepayment for the supply of products under a lend-lease.

== Etymology ==
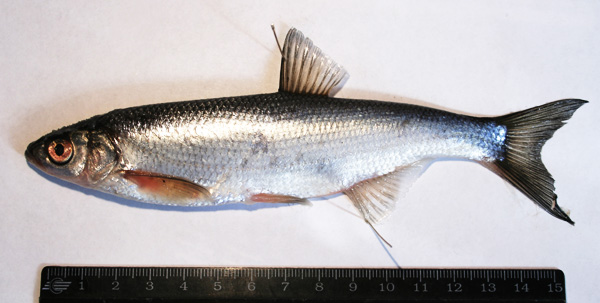
Sielawa fish

The Polish names of the lake listed in the 19th-century geographical dictionary of the Kingdom of Poland are Sielawa and alternatively Starożyszcze or Długie. According to the same source, the name Sielawa was to come from the numerous fish of the species called sielawa found in the lake.
