= Narach (resort settlement) =

Narach Нарач (Belarusian) Нарочь (Russian) Naroch
- Urban-type settlement
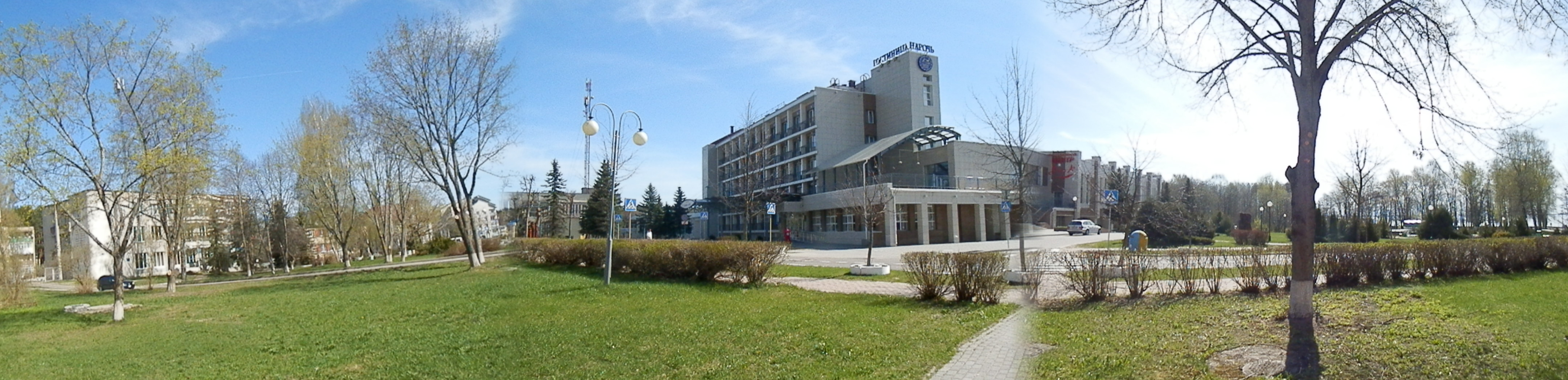

- Location within Belarus
- Coordinates: 54.9312°N 26.6884°E
- Country: Belarus
- Region: Minsk Region
- District: Myadzyel District

Population (2026)
  - Total: 3,736
- Time zone: UTC+3 (MSK)

Narach or Naroch (Note: Belarusian: Нарач, romanized: Narač; Russian: Нарочь, romanized: Naroch; Polish: Kupa; Lithuanian: Naročius.) is an urban-type settlement (a resort settlement) in Myadzyel District, Minsk Region, Belarus. It is located near Lake Narach. As of 2026, it has a population of 3,736.

== History ==
It was established in 1964 in place of the former village Kupa.
