= Church of Saint Andrew, Narach =

Coordinates: 54°53′N 26°44′E

Church of Saint Andrew Babola
- Касцёл святога Андрэя апостала
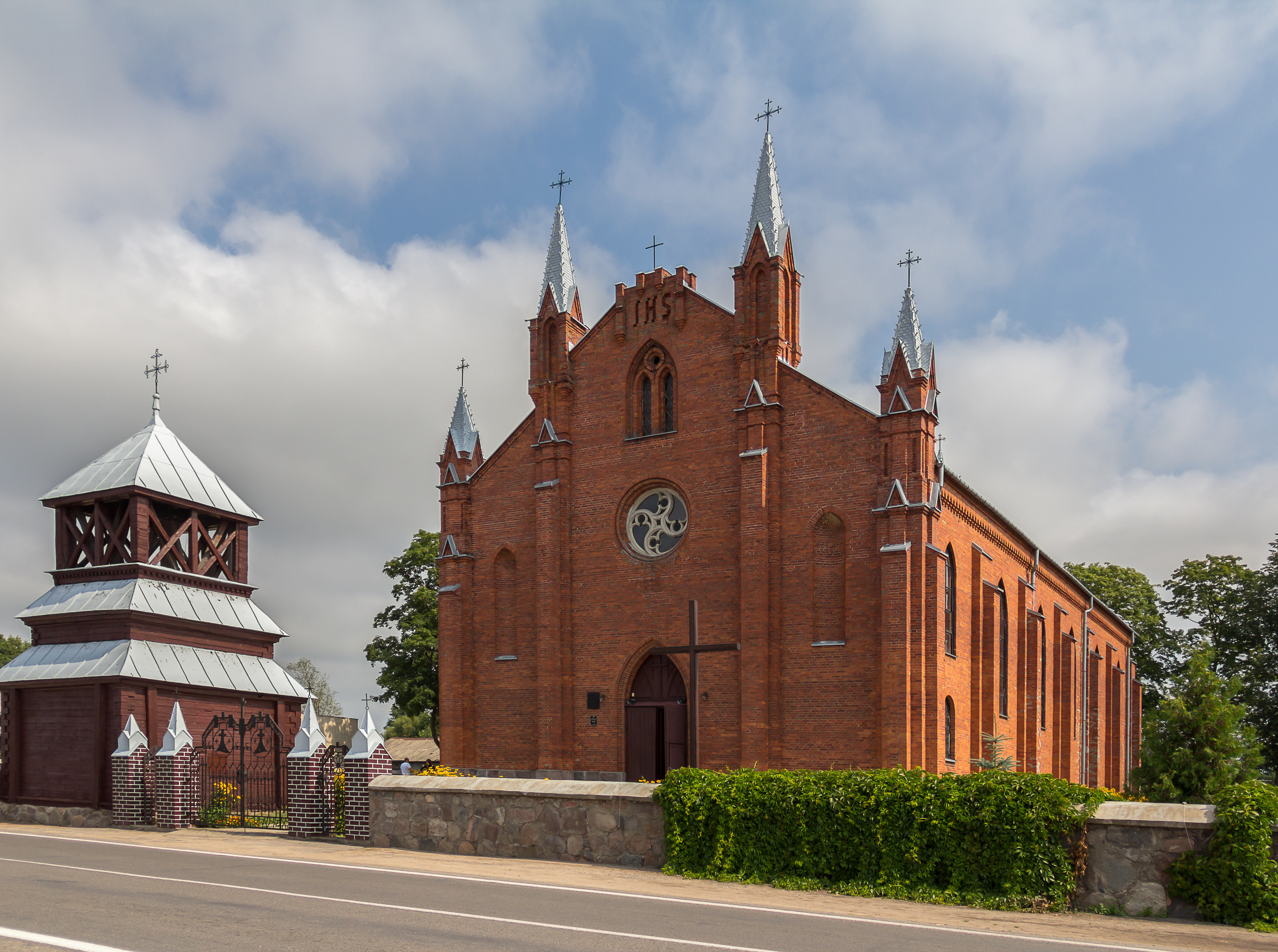
- The Church and the Belltower in 2012
- Church of Saint Andrew Babola
- Location: Narach
- Country: Belarus
- Denomination: Roman Catholic church
- Religious institute: Carmelites

Architecture
- Completed: 1897-1901

Church of Saint Andrew Babola in Narach is a Neo-Gothic Roman Catholic church in Minsk region, Belarus, built in 1897–1901. Nowadays the church belongs to the Discalced Carmelites.

== History ==
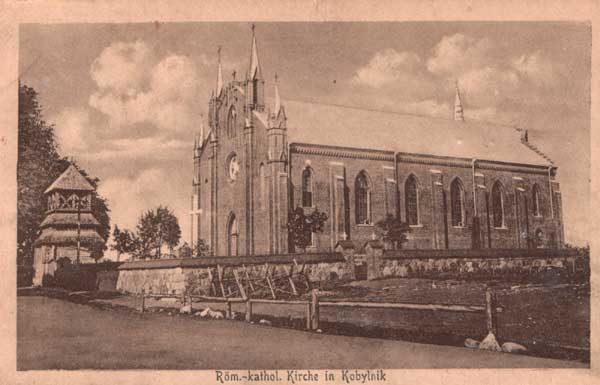
Before 1917

The first wooden church on this site was built around 1651. By 1746 it decayed and was reconstructed by Marcin Teodor Oskierka. The written documents of that time describe the church as a huge construction with six altars.

In 1862 a fire damaged the building; it was restored on donations of the prior and the parish. A painting of Alfred Izydor Romer allows us to imagine the appearance of the church in that time. It was decorated according to Uniate tradition.

The cornerstone of the new church was laid on September 2, 1897, by the efforts of Ignazy Rossolovsky. The money for the construction was donated by the local parish. The red bricks were brought from Pastavy, the wood was given by sir Skirmunt from Szemetowo. The works were finished by August 4, 1901. When the stone church was constructed, the old wooden one was demolished (however, the historical wooden bell tower is still intact, it was restored in 1995 and 2019).

The new church was consecrated on September 9, 1901. The works on the interiors resumed and only three years later the temple was officially opened by the bishop Eduard von der Ropp. In 1902 the pipe organ was installed.

The parish registers were keeping records of all births, deaths and marriages in the parish up to 1938. After the World War II the church was closed by order of the Soviet authorities. The services resumed only after the dissolution of the Soviet Union, then the Discalced Carmelites took over.

== XXI Century ==
On August 22, 2019, a memorial plaque was installed in the church in honor of Lech Kaczyński's wife Maria.
