= Church of Saint Mary, Myadzyel =

Church in Minsk Region, Belarus

Coordinates: 54°52′56″N 26°55′21″E

Church of Saint Mary
- Касцёл Маці Божай Шкаплернай
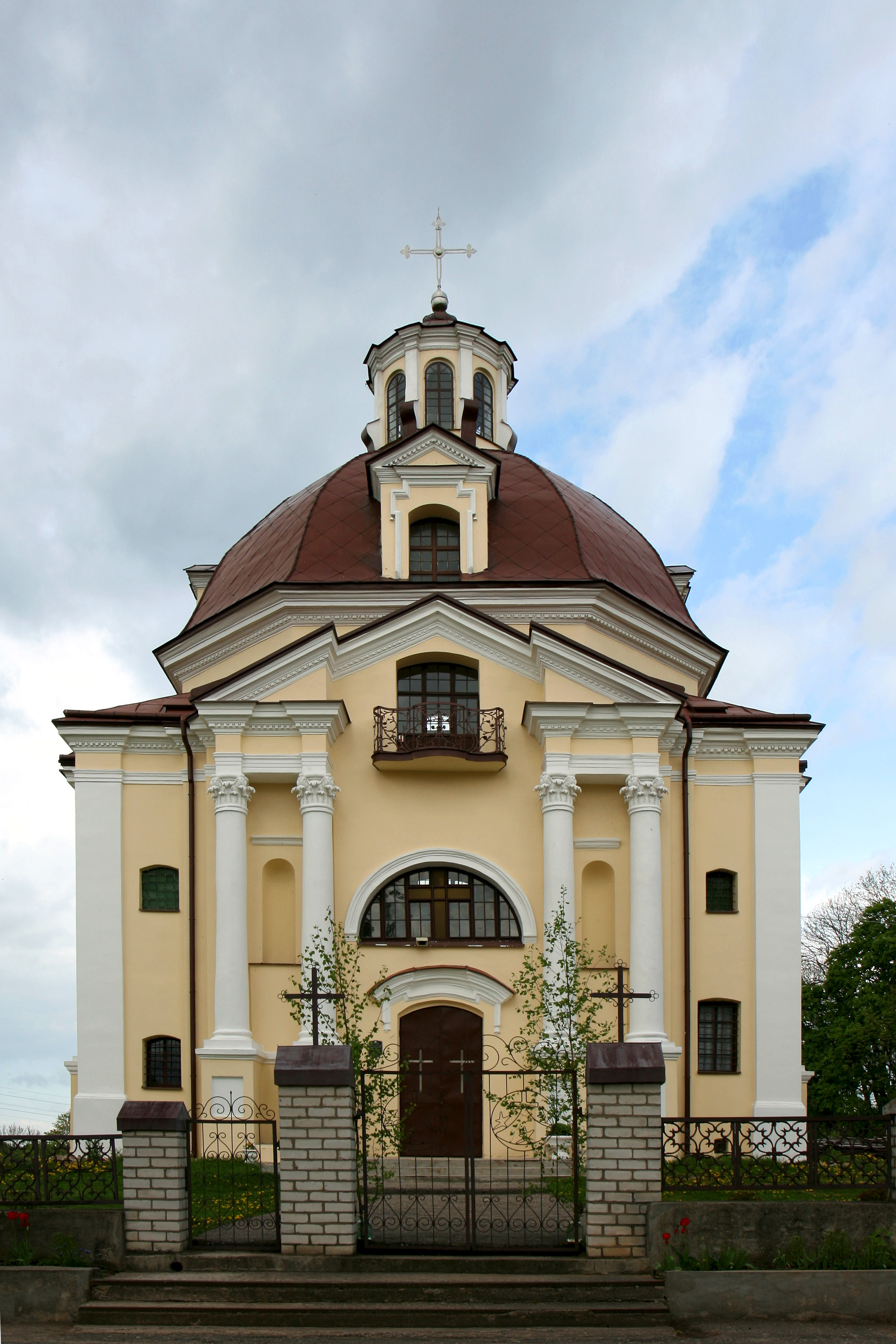
- Church of Saint Mary
- Location: Myadzyel, Gagarina str., 19/2
- Country: Belarus
- Denomination: Roman Catholic church
- Religious institute: Discalced Carmelites

Architecture
- Style: Baroque
- Completed: 1754

Administration
- Diocese: Roman Catholic Archdiocese of Minsk–Mohilev

The Church of Saint Mary in Myadzyel, Belarus, is a Catholic church, listed as a Cultural Heritage object. The church was constructed in 1754 for the Discalced Carmelites' monastery.

== History ==
=== 15th–19th centuries ===
According to the Kodeks dyplomatyczny katedry i diecezji wileńskie, or Codex diplomaticus ecclesiae cathedralis necnon Dioeceseos Vilnensis, a collection of medieval manuscripts in the Latin language, in 1457 the Voivode Andrius Sakaitis donated provisions to the church, established by him and consecrated by bishop Nikolaj. The document was signed by several high-ranked priests and noblemen.

The stone church for the Discalced Carmelites was built in 1754 by Miadziel's owner Antoniy Koshitz. An Octagon on cube type, it was topped with a faceted dome, frescoes covered the inner walls. The church was consecrated on August 15, 1754. By 1830, the local parish had more than 865 members. In the aftermath of the November Uprising all Carmelite monasteries within the borders of modern Belarus were closed. The monastery in Miadziel was disbanded in 1832, in 1863 all its buildings and the church of St Mary were given to the Orthodox church.

=== 20th century ===
In 1921 Miadziel became a part of the Second Polish Republic, in 1927 the monastery was returned to the Carmelites. They began the restoration that lasted up to 1941. During the Second World War, the monastery supported the Home Army. Its buildings were burned down in 1943 by the Soviet partisans, after the war the church was used as a warehouse for agricultural machinery.

In 1982 archaeologists Zianon Pazniak and Michael Chernyavskiy (archaeologist) began excavations near the church and discovered a massive stone foundation and a fragment of a brick wall, that presumably was the Uniate church of the XVII century.

The church was consecrated again in 1990.

=== 21st century ===
In 2016 the church was restored. In January 2019 Belarusian media published the news about sensational discoveries in the church. In one of the walls the researchers found hallows of Pope Gregory I and Saint Cecilia.

== Gallery ==
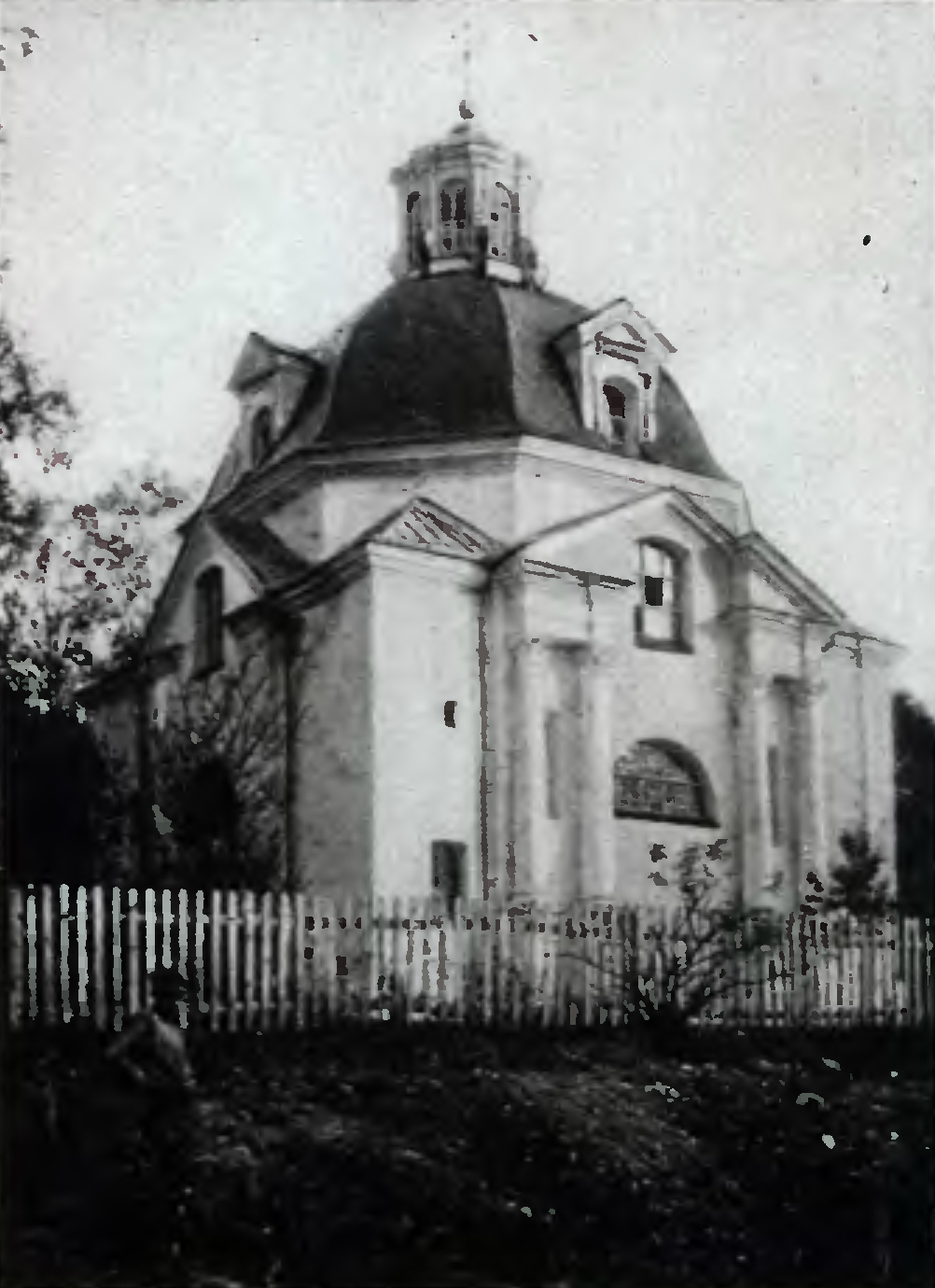
The church before 1930

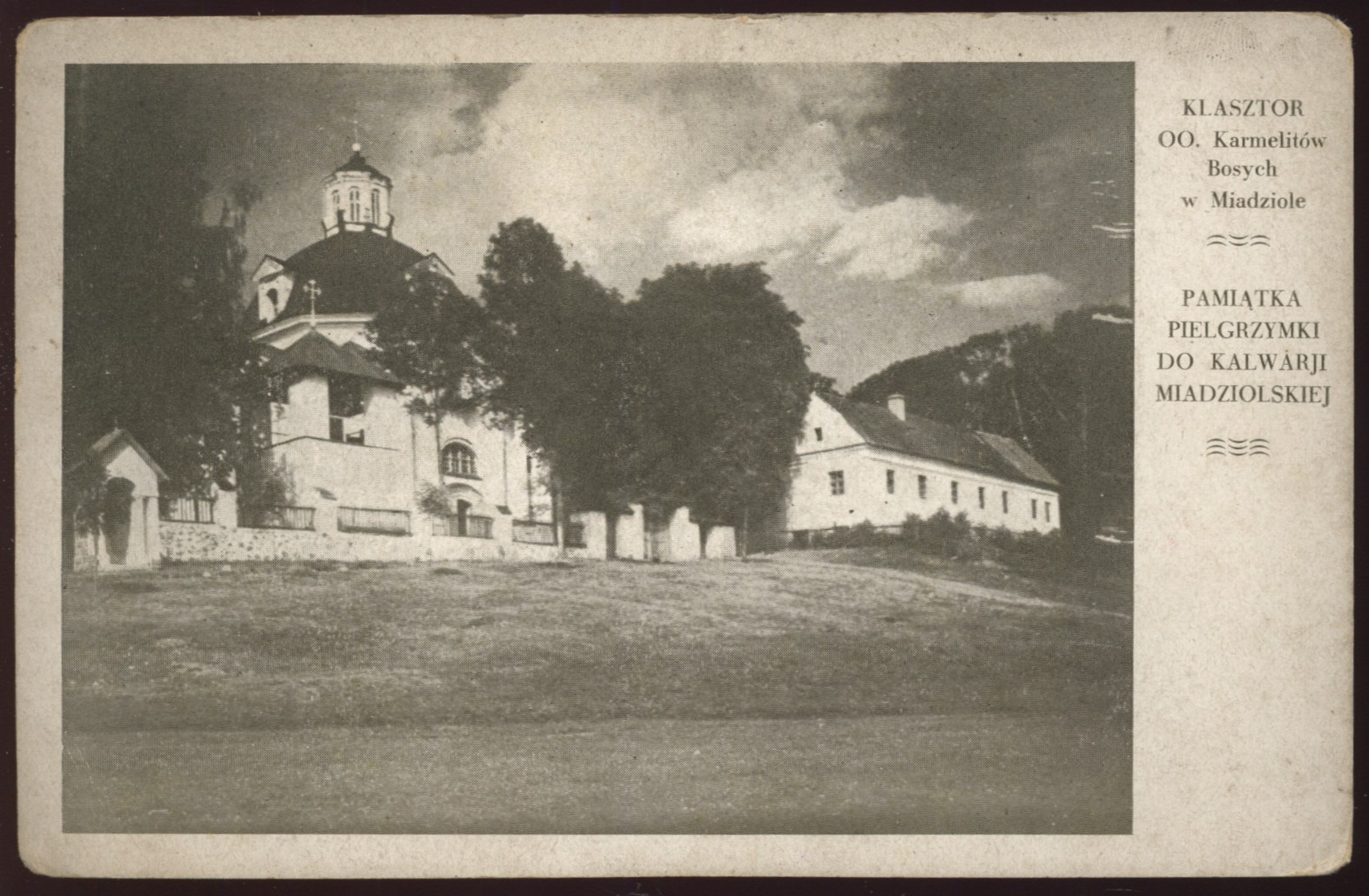
Church before 1939

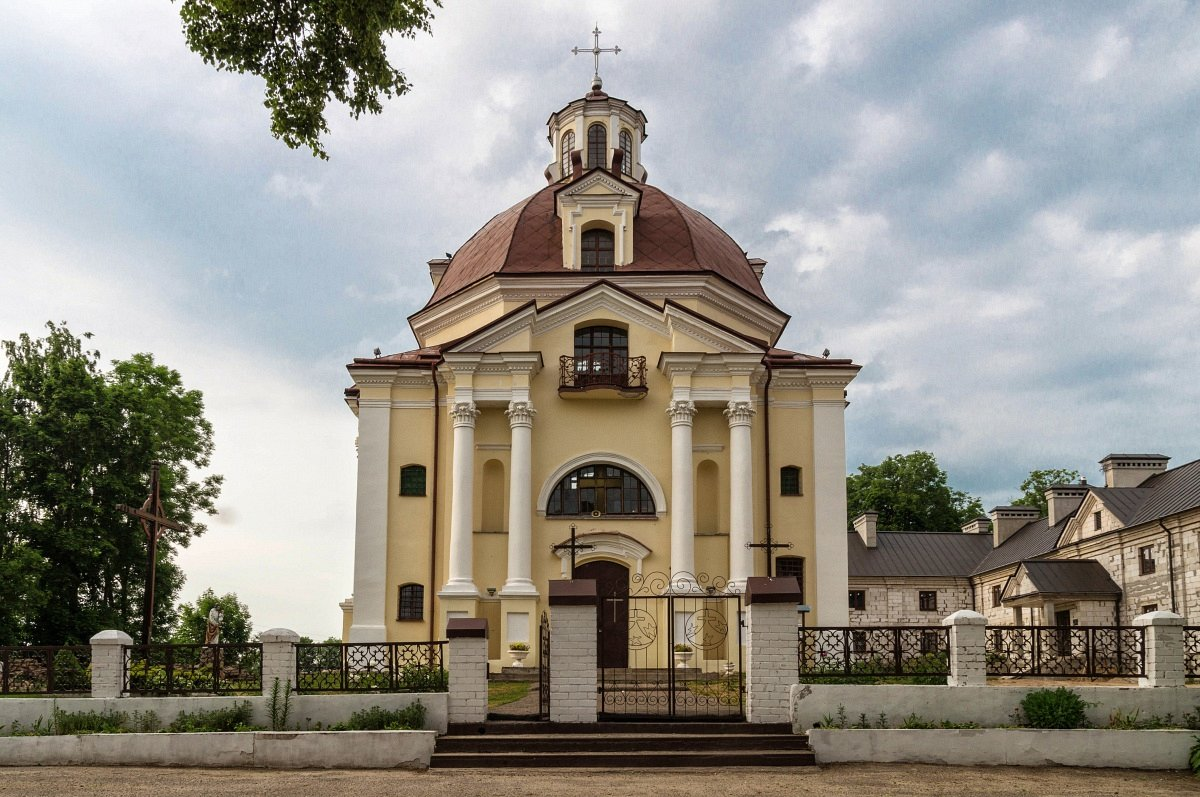
The church in 2015

== Sources ==
- Fijałek, W. J.; Semkowicz, W. (1948). Kodeks dyplomatyczny katedry i diecezji wileńskiej = Codex diplomaticus ecclesiae cathedralis necnon Dioeceseos Vilnensis, part 1 (1387—1507). Kraków. pp. 252–253.
- Kulagin, A. M. (1993). Архітэктура Беларусі. Энцыклапедычны даведнік» [Belarusian Architecture: Encyclopedia]. Minsk: «Беларуская Энцыклапедыя імя Петруся Броўкі». p. 413. ISBN 5-85700-078-5.
- Gabrus, T. V. (2001). Мядзел. Касцёл Маці Божай Шкаплернай [Miadziel: Church of Saint Mary]. Minsk: Мураваныя харалы беларускага барока. ISBN 985-04-0499-X.
