= Flag of Minsk region =

Flag of Minsk Region

The flag of Minsk Region is the official flag of Minsk Region, Belarus. It was approved on November 22, 2007, by decree #595 of the President. The flag has a red field whose obverse side is charged with the coat of arms of Minsk Region. It has a 1:2 ratio.
