= Narachanski National Park =

National park in Belarus

- Нарачанскі нацыянальны парк (Belarusian)
- IUCN category II (national park)
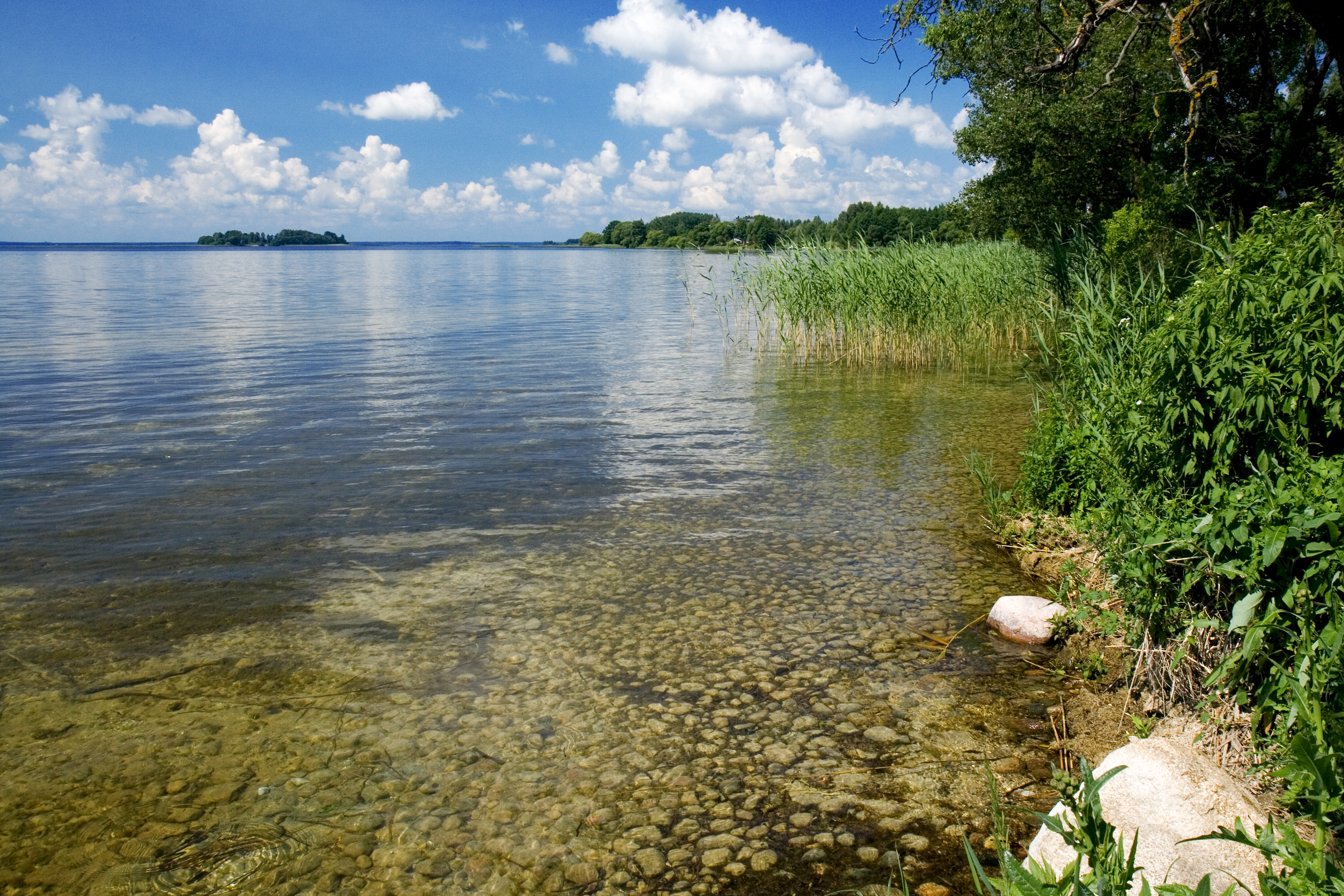
- Lake Narach

- Location within Belarus
- Interactive map of Narachanski National Park
- Location: Minsk Region in Belarus
- Coordinates: 54.85°N 26.7333°E
- Area: 933 km^{2} (360 sq mi) (2015)
- Established: 1999

Narаchanski (Narochansky) National Park (Belarusian: Нарачанскі, Naračanski; Russian: Нарочанский, Naročanskij) is a national park in Belarus that is named after Lake Narach.

== History ==
Park was created on July 28, 1999, and covers an area of more than 87,000 hectares.

== Park fauna ==
Mammal species inhabiting in the park include the red deer, raccoon dog, European badger, marten, and otter; existing fish species include common bream, silver bream, and crucian carp. The national park also includes 218 other species of birds, such as the bittern, osprey and the common crane

== See also ==
- List of national parks in the Baltics
