= Krupki =

Town in Minsk Region, Belarus

Krupki Крупкі (Belarusian)
- Town
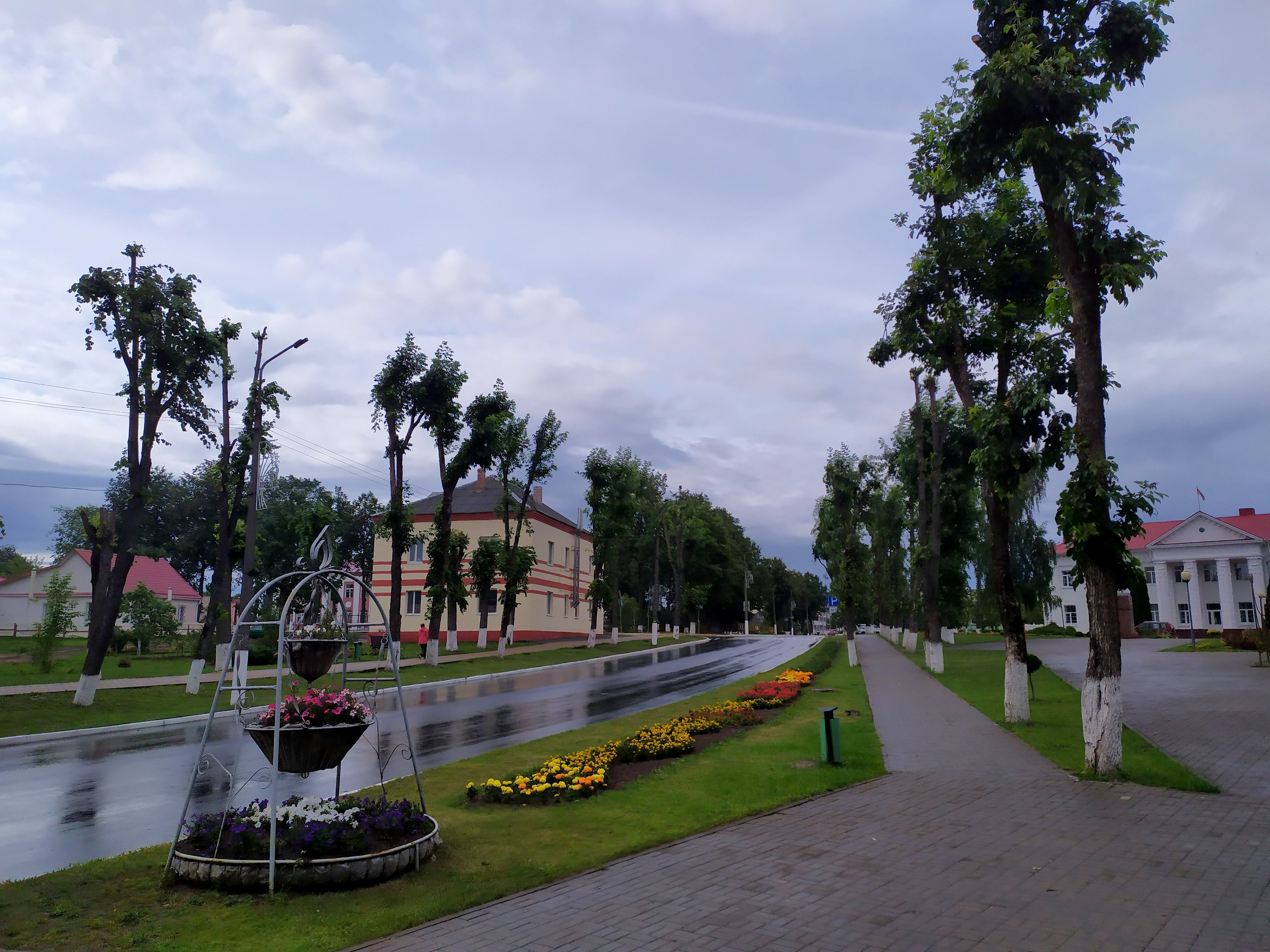

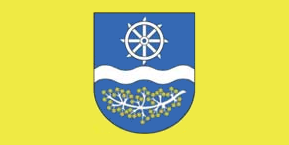
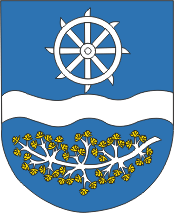
- Flag Coat of arms

- Location within Belarus
- Coordinates: 54°19′N 29°08′E
- Country: Belarus
- Region: Minsk Region
- District: Krupki District
- Established: 1067

Government
  - Chairman: Igor Chesnok
- Elevation: 174 m (571 ft)

Population (2026)
  - Total: 8,276
- Time zone: UTC+3 (MSK)
- Postal code: 222001-222002
- Area code: +375 1796

Krupki (Note: Belarusian: Крупкі; Russian: Крупки; Polish: Krupki; Lithuanian: Krupkos.) is a town in Minsk Region, in east-central Belarus. It serves as the administrative center of Krupki District. As of 2026, it has a population of 8,276.

== History ==
=== Early history ===
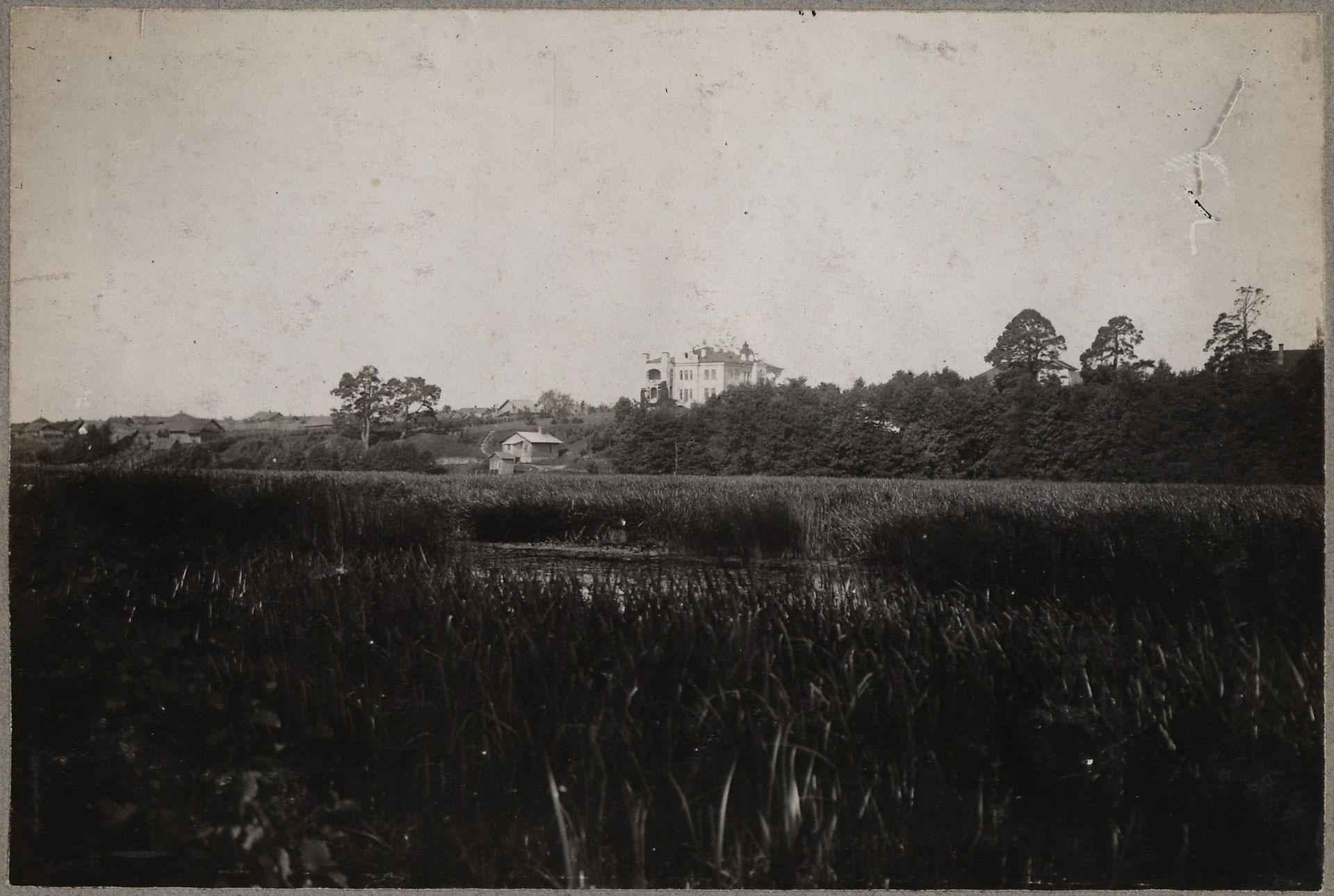
Krupki in 1910

Krupki was founded in 1067. Krupki was absorbed into the Grand Duchy of Lithuania and then formed part of the Polish–Lithuanian Commonwealth, after which, the district was annexed by the Russian Empire in 1793. Krupki became the administrative centre of its district and got its own council in 1900. The town’s coat of arms is a white, blue and yellow shield.

The old, wooden Bogoroditskaya Church in the nearby village of Hodovcy is a tourist site and of historic value.

The town's population was 1,800 (mostly Jewish) people in 166 houses, according to an 1895 Russian Encyclopedia, and 2,080 (largely non 'Hebrews') in 1926 according to a similar reference book of 1961. There is no apparent evidence that any of Russia's endemic famines or pre-Revolutionary bread riots had broken out in Krupki town or its immediate environs.

=== Jewish community ===
The Yiddish Jewish settlement in Krupki is first noted in the 17th century and was thriving by the middle of the 18th century. About 40% of the Jews were employed as laborers and craftsmen and a Yiddish school was established in the town. There were three Hebrew schools in Krupki by the 1890s according to the 1895 Russian Encyclopedia.

About 75% of the local Jews fled the town during the Russian Revolution and subsequent Russian Civil War, for either Western Europe or the United States. Only 870 of them remained in situ by 1939. There were also small Polish, Poleszuk, Lithuanian and Roma settlements in Krupki.

=== World War I and World War II ===
The town was briefly taken by a small unit of Prussian troops during the later part of the First World War. Belarus first declared independence on 25 March 1918, forming the Democratic Republic of Belarus and later the Soviet Socialist Republic of Byelorussia. As a result, Krupki was incorporated into the Soviet Union after western Belarus and the border city of Brest were given to Poland and the eastern parts, along with the city of Minsk, joined the USSR, between the two world wars.

Nazi Germany invaded the Soviet Union in 1941. On 18 September 1941 the entire Jewish Ghetto, a community of 1,000 people was killed by the Nazis. The massacre was described in the diary of one of the German perpetrators. The first massacre involved 100 deaths near the graveyard, but a later killing spree killed roughly 900 other Jews in a different location.

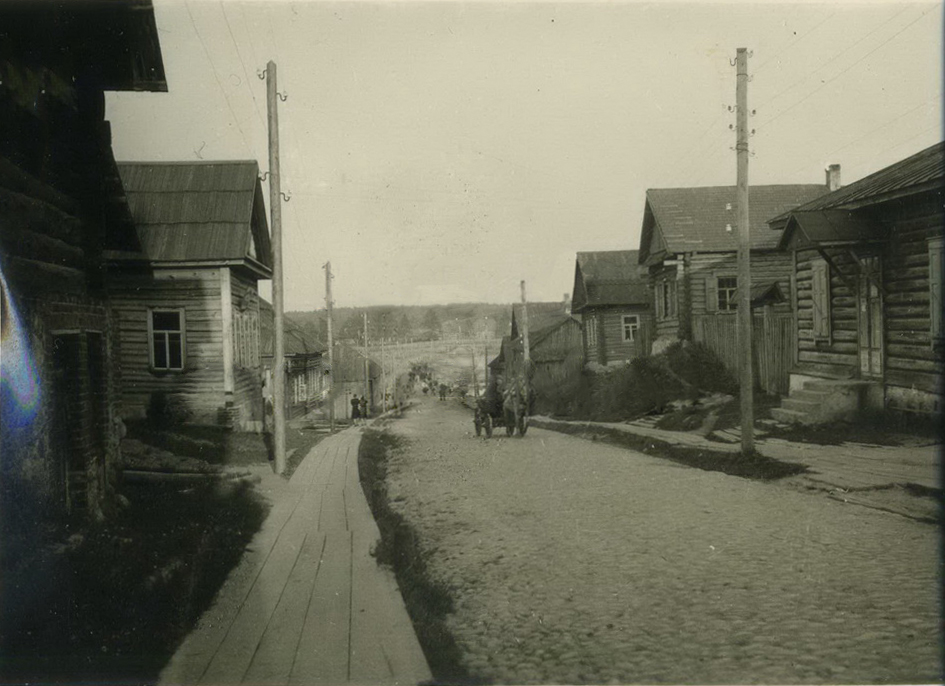
Krupki in 1943

At first, the Germans told the Jews to gather together because they were being deported to Germany. But as the German forced them into a ditch, it was evident what the Germans had in mind. At this point, panic ensued.

Ten shots rang out, ten Jews popped off. This continued until all were dispatched. Only a few of them kept their countenances. The children clung to their mothers, wives to their husbands. I won’t forget this spectacle in a hurry...

Some of the Germans and Austrians involved in the incident were also injured during the panic. Very few, if any, of the local Belarusians, Roma/Gypsies or Poles supported the anti-Semitic attack and a few even actively opposed Nazi rule in their town altogether. Krupki was liberated by the Red Army in June 1944. Belarus was the hardest hit Soviet Republic in the war and remained in Nazi hands until it was liberated in 1944 during the Minsk Offensive. The Jewish population of Belarus was devastated and never recovered.

==== Krupki and Wehrmacht Complicity ====
The Krupki massacre of September 1941 has played a role in the Historikerstreit and is analyzed by historian Waitman Wade Beorn in his study of German atrocities in Belarus. Given the direct participation of Wehrmacht soldiers in this killing operation— in this case, the 354th Infantry, including the 3rd Battalion under Major Johannes Waldow— Beorn believes it provides an early example of Wehrmacht complicity in the Holocaust. He argues that the majority of regular German soldiers "were not volunteers but did not evade participation." The involvement of the 354th was largely restricted to security or support roles for the SS, rather than direct killing of civilians, but other units in Belarus would gradually assume more direct roles in SS mass killing operations. The Krupki murders serve as an illuminating starting point in the study of Wehrmacht involvement in Nazi atrocities. Though the work of shooting civilians was admittedly grisly, the organizational culture of the Wehrmacht pressured the common soldier to "accept unpleasant necessities" in the furtherance of larger military or racial goals.

=== During the Cold War ===
The town was violently assailed by KGB-related elements. It would remain part of the Belorussian SSR until 1991, when it became part of the state of Belarus. Krupki's population had reached 5,000 by 1977.

Junior Sergeant/Rifleman Vladimir Olegovich Kriptoshenko was awarded the Order of the Red Banner and Order of the Red Star (both posthumously) after being killed by grenade explosion during the 1988 Battle for Hill 3234 whilst serving in the Soviet occupation of Afghanistan.

Map of radiation levels in 1996 around Chernobyl.

The Oblast was moderately irradiated in the Chernobyl disaster.

=== The post-Soviet era ===
Krupki became a part of the state of Belarus in 1991 after the collapse of the Soviet Union. A memorial cross dedicated to the victims of the Soviet purge was destroyed by neo-Communists in 2009. There are various memorials, dedicated to, among others, Alena Kolesova, U.M. Martinkevich, and astronaut Vladimir Kovalyonok.

== Geography ==
Krupki lies 65 mi (110 km) to the East of Minsk and is located at an altitude of 174 m. The name means either to grind grain or the (grain) mill.

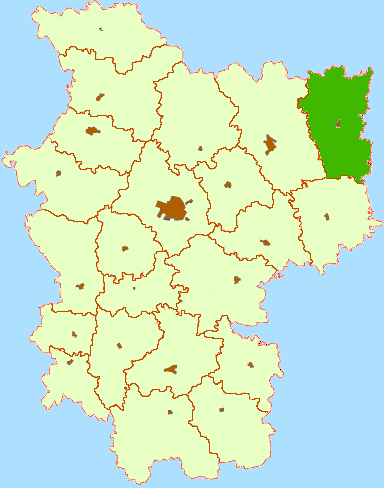
Krupki District inside Minsk Region.

The Bobr river flows through the town. The climate of Krupki is moderately continental, a transitional form from maritime to continental with relatively mild winters and warm summers.

== Demographics ==
It is mostly inhabited by Belarusians, but also has Russian, Polish, Ukrainian and Jewish minorities. The population was around 5,000 in 1977. Krupki has Eastern Orthodox, Catholic, Protestant and Jewish communities. There is a synagogue and several churches in the town and the nearby wooden Orthodox church.

Historical population

Year	Pop.	±%
1939	3,455	—
1959	4,749	+37.5%
1970	5,940	+25.1%
1979	8,123	+36.8%
1989	8,726	+7.4%
2006	8,643	−1.0%

Year	Pop.	±%
2018	8,650	+0.1%
2023	8,487	−1.9%
2024	8,410	−0.9%
2025	8,393	−0.2%
2026	8,276	−1.4%

Source: :

== Economy and transportation ==
It consists of both woodworking, flax, forestry, the farming of fruit and vegetables and food processing. It once used to make pottery, produce bread and manufacture matches.

The roads are mostly tarmacked and are of an average grade for Belarusian road ways. The nearest airports are in Minsk and Krupki has a railway station.
