= Krupki district =

District of Minsk region, Belarus

Krupki district Крупскі раён (Belarusian) Крупский район (Russian)
- District
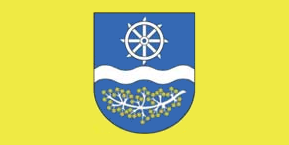
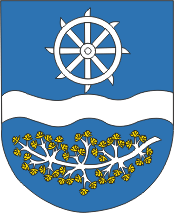
- Flag Coat of arms

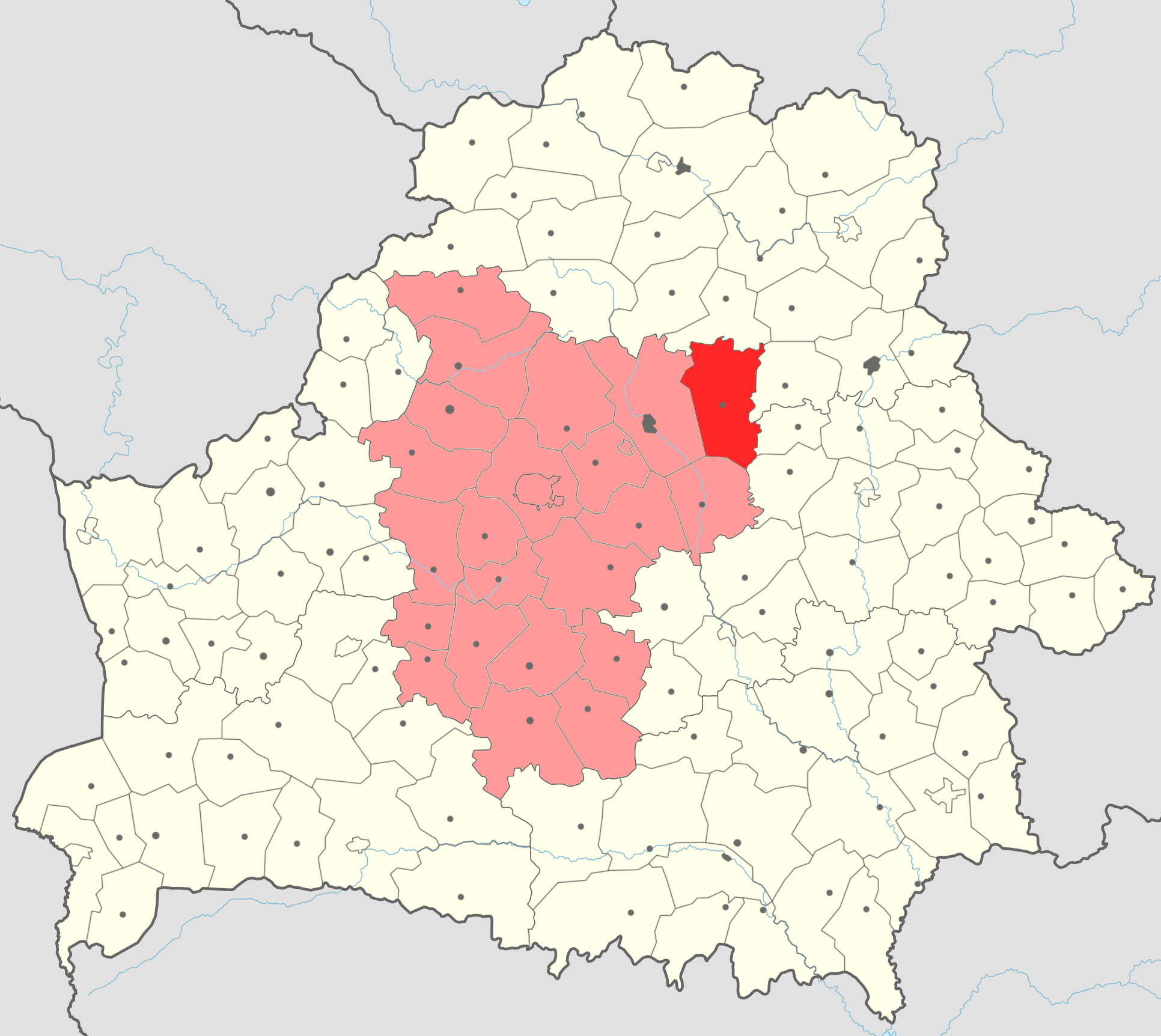
- Coordinates: 54°19′30″N 29°08′10″E
- Country: Belarus
- Region: Minsk region
- Administrative center: Krupki

Area
  - District: 2,138 km^{2} (825 sq mi)

Population (2024)
  - District: 21,723
  - Density: 10.16/km^{2} (26.32/sq mi)
  - Urban: 10,641
  - Rural: 11,082
- Website: Krupki ispolkom website

Krupki district (Belarusian: Крупскі раён; Russian: Крупский район) is a district (raion) of Minsk region in Belarus. Its administrative center is the town of Krupki. Also located in the district are the urban-type settlements of Bobr and Khalopyenichy. As of 2024, it has a population of 21,723.

The largest lake of the district is Syalyava, the 14th-largest lake in Belarus.

== Notable residents ==
- Vladimir Kovalyonok (1942, Belaje village), Soviet Belarusian cosmonaut
- Ales Pushkin (1965, Bobr village – 2023), Belarusian non-conformist painter, theater artist, performer, art curator, and political prisoner
