= Myadzyel district =

District of Minsk region, Belarus

Myadzyel district Мядзельскі раён (Belarusian) Мядельский район (Russian)
- District
- Flag Coat of arms

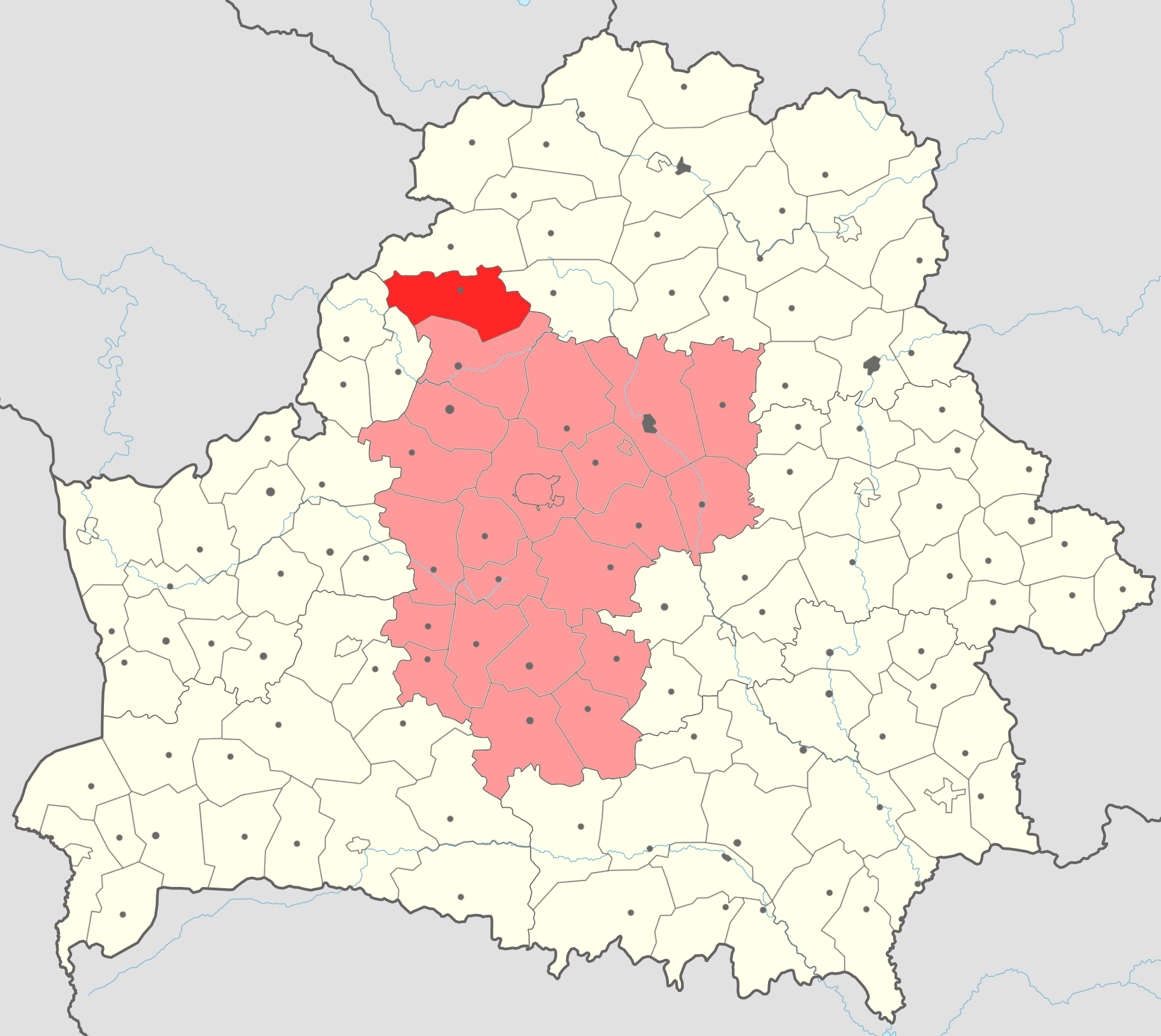
- Coordinates: 54°52′32″N 26°56′19″E
- Country: Belarus
- Region: Minsk region
- Administrative center: Myadzyel

Area
  - District: 1,967 km^{2} (759 sq mi)

Population (2024)
  - District: 24,326
  - Urban: 12,846
  - Rural: 11,480
- Time zone: UTC+3 (MSK)
- Website: Myadzyel ispolkom website

Myadzyel district or Miadziel district (Belarusian: Мядзельскі раён, romanized: Miadzielski rajon; Russian: Мядельский район) is a district (raion) of Minsk region in Belarus. Its administrative center is the town of Myadzyel. As of 2024, it has a population of 24,326.

Four of the main lakes of Belarus are situated in this district: Narach (the largest one), Svir (8th largest), Myadel (11th largest) and Myastro (15th largest).

== Notable residents ==
- Maksim Tank (1912–1995), journalist, poet and translator
- Dr. Vincent Žuk-Hryškievič (1903–1989), Belarusian emigre politician, President of the Rada of the Belarusian Democratic Republic between 1971 and 1982
