= Minsk region =

Region of Belarus

Minsk region Мінская вобласць (Belarusian) Минская область (Russian)
- Region
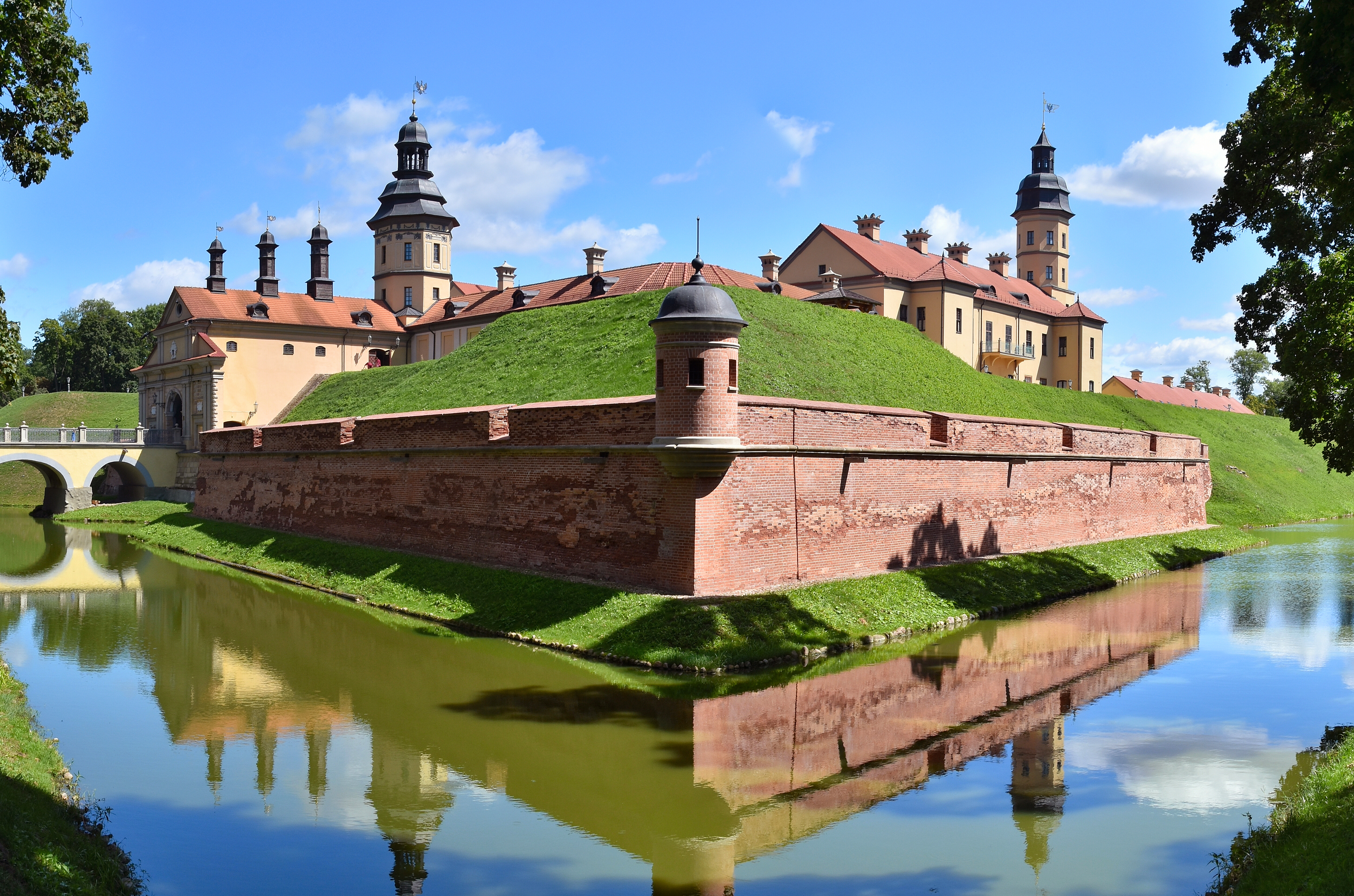
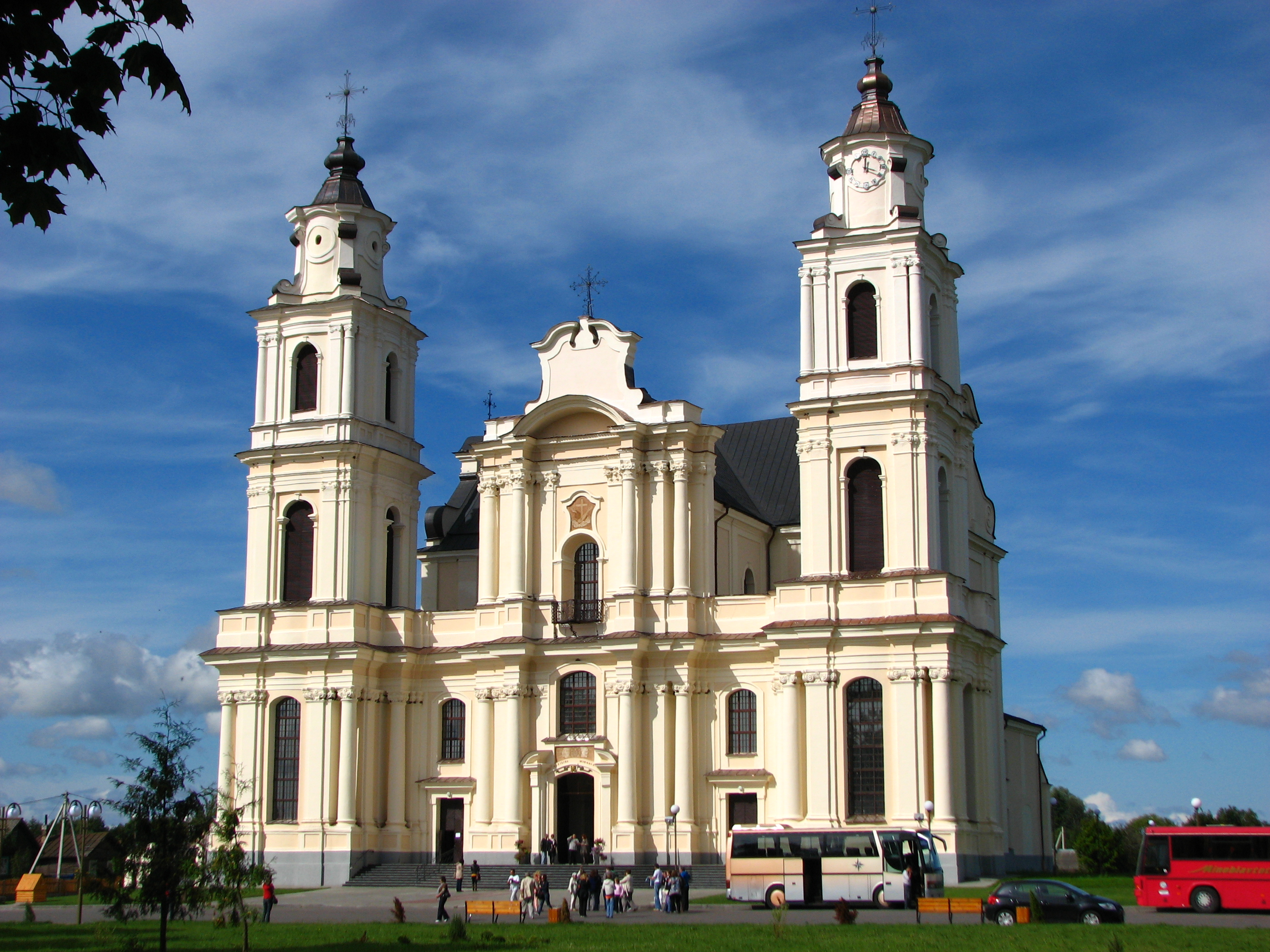
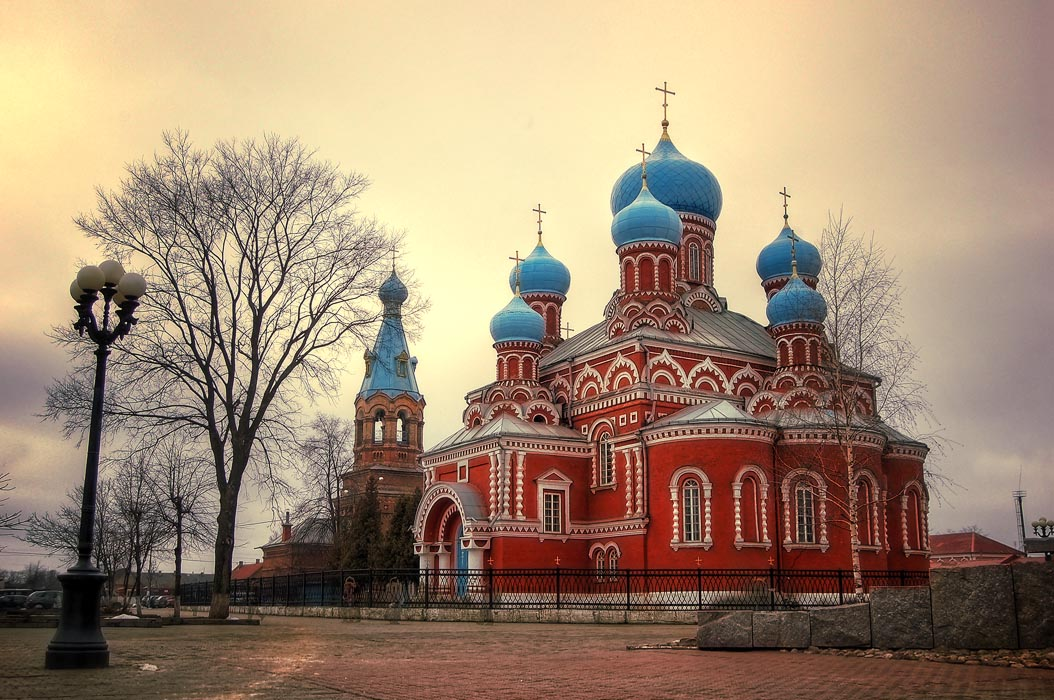
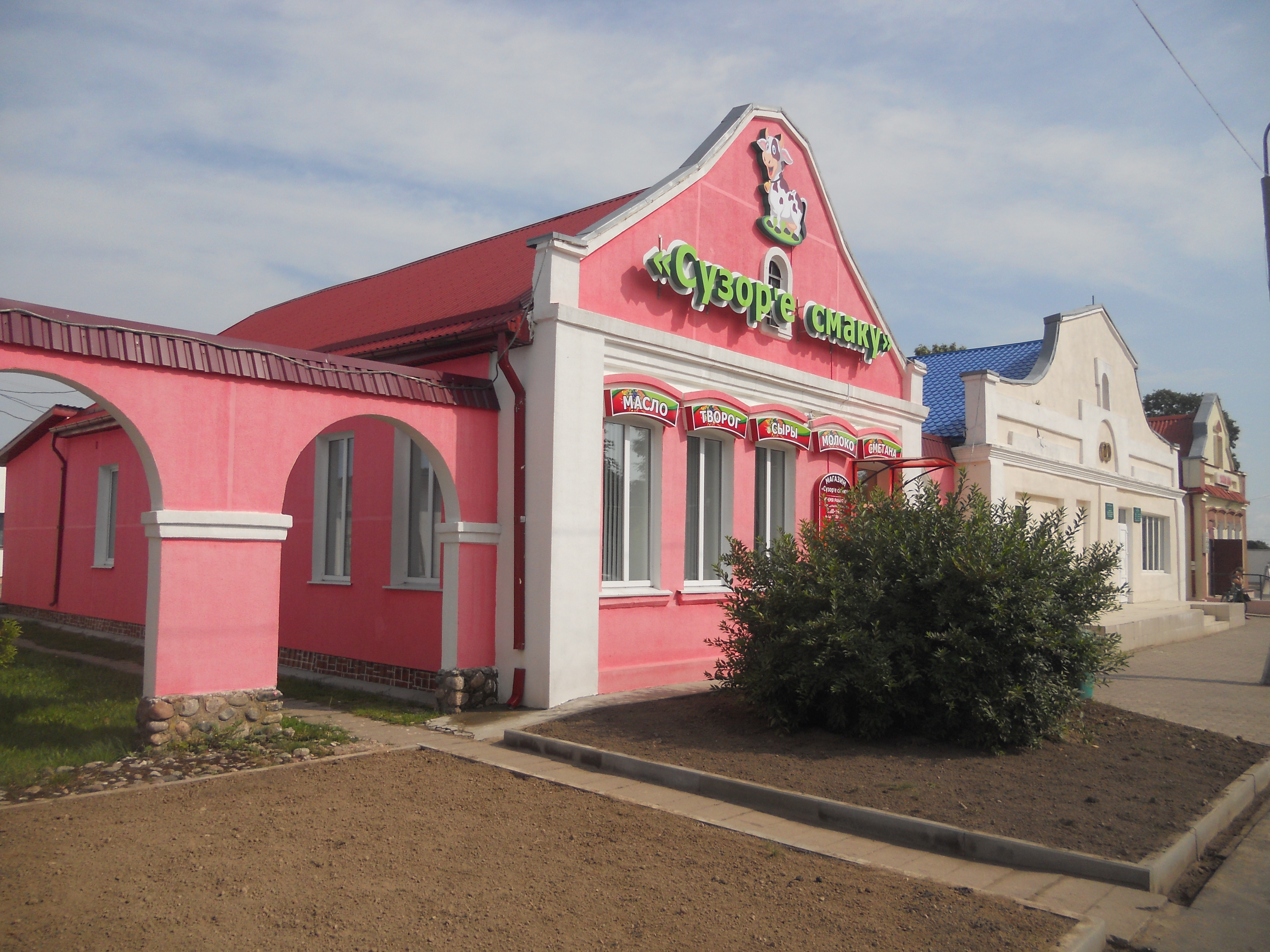
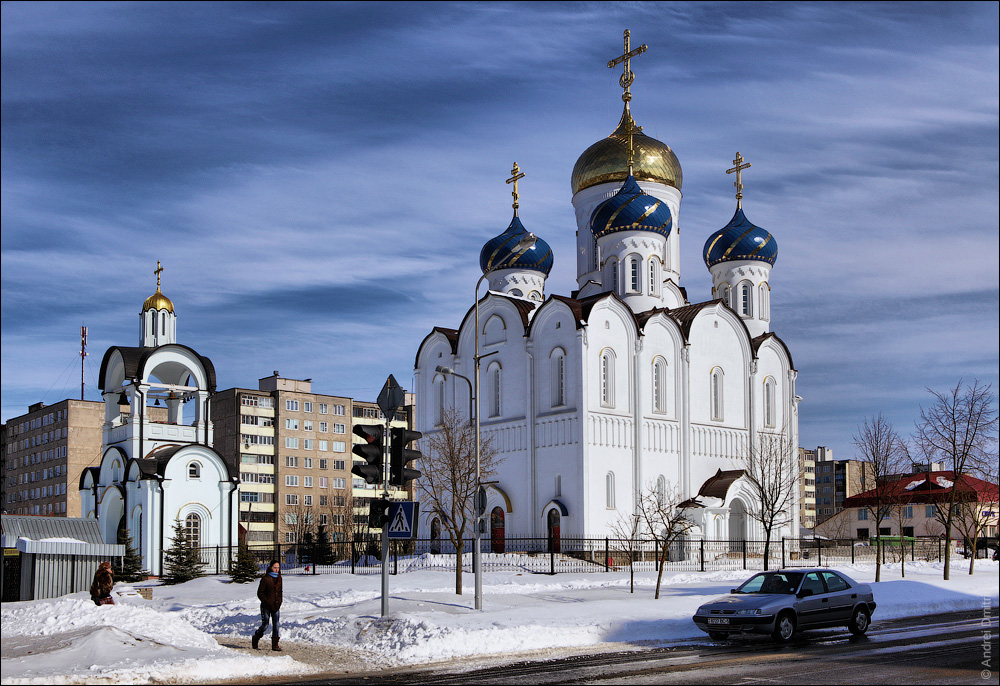
- From the top to bottom-right: Nesvizh Castle, Church of the Assumption of the Blessed Virgin Mary in Budslaw, Church of the Resurrection of Christ in Barysaw, Kapyl, Maladzyechna

- Flag Coat of arms

- Interactive map of Minsk region
- Coordinates: 53°40′N 27°45′E
- Country: Belarus
- Administrative center: Minsk
- Largest cities: Barysaw: 150,400; Salihorsk: 101,400; Maladzyechna: 98,514
- Districts: 22 (and 1 subordinate city); Cities: 22; Urban localities: 20
- City districts: 8

Government
  - Chairman: Alexey Kushnarenko

Area
  - Total: 39,912.35 km^{2} (15,410.24 sq mi)
- Highest elevation: 345 m (1,132 ft)

Population (2024)
  - Total: 1,460,289
  - Density: 36.58740/km^{2} (94.76092/sq mi)

GDP (nominal,2024)
  - Total: Br 48.276 billion (US$14.787 billion)
  - Per capita: Br 33,104 (US$10,140)
- Area code: +375 17
- ISO 3166 code: BY-MI
- HDI (2022): 0.811 very high · 1st
- Website: www.minsk-region.gov.by

Minsk region, also known as Minsk oblast (Note: Russian: Минская область, romanized: Minskaya oblast'.) or Minsk voblasts, (Note: Belarusian: Мінская вобласць, romanized: Minskaja voblasć, IPA: [ˈmʲinskaja ˈvɔblasʲt͡sʲ].) is one of the six regions of Belarus. Its administrative center is Minsk, although it is a separate administrative territorial entity of Belarus. The region's population was recorded at 1,411,500 in 2011.

== Geography ==
Minsk region covers a total area of 39,900 square kilometres (15,400 sq mi), about 19.44% of the total area of the entire country. Lake Narach, the largest lake in the country, is located in the northern part of the region. There are four other large lakes in this region: Svir (8th largest), Myadel (11th largest), Syalyava (14th largest) and Myastro (15th largest). It is the only region of Belarus to not border a foreign country.

== History ==
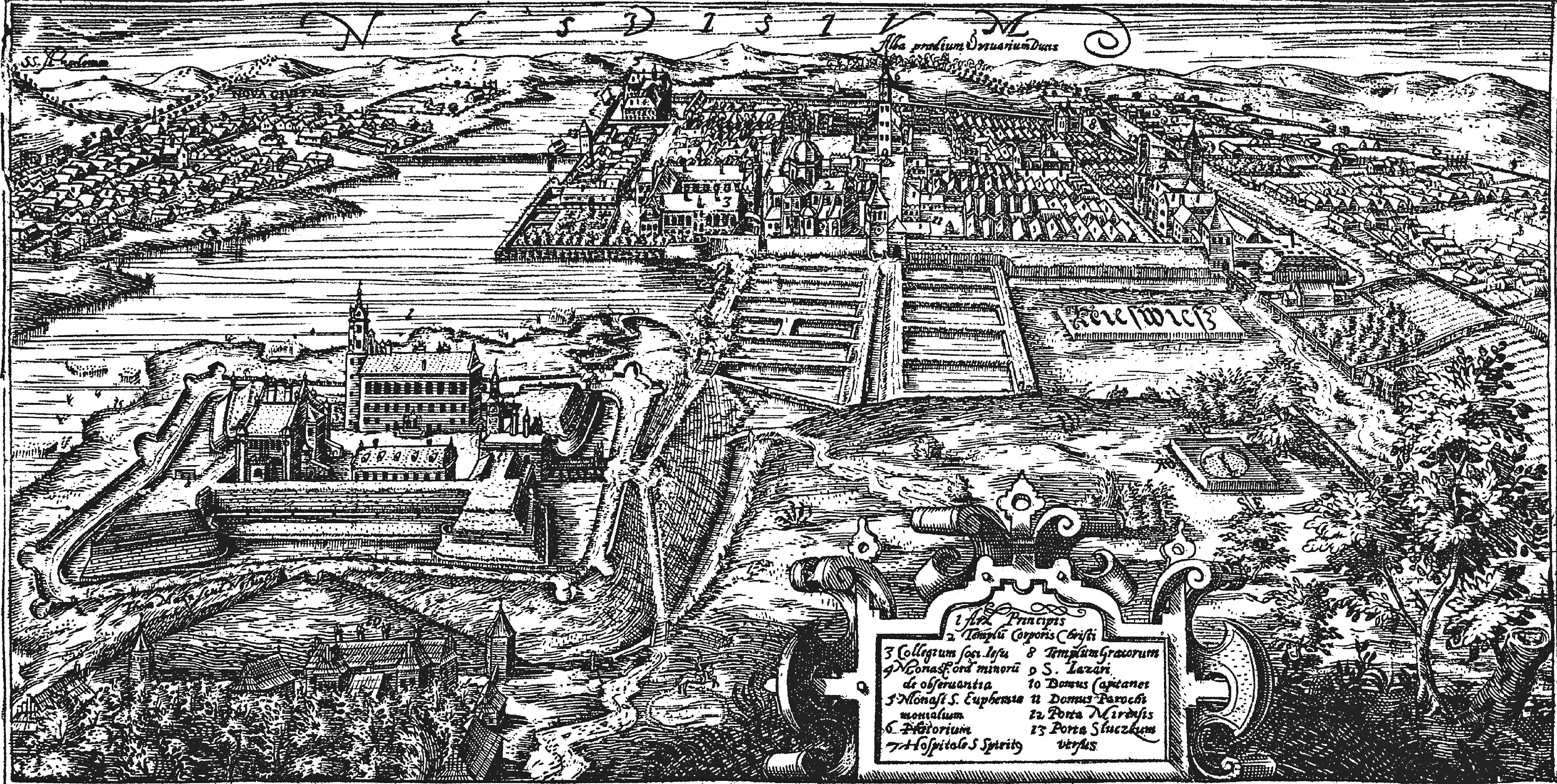
17th-century view of Nyasvizh, important residential city of the powerful magnate Radziwiłł family

Beginning the 10th century, the territory of the current Minsk region was part of Kievan Rus', the Principality of Polotsk, and later it was included in the Grand Duchy of Lithuania. With the unification of the Grand Duchy of Lithuania and the Kingdom of Poland, the territory became part of the Polish–Lithuanian Commonwealth.

In 1793, as a result of the Second Partition of Poland, the area was annexed by Russia as the Minsk region. During the collapse of the Russian Empire due to the Civil War, the western part was annexed to Poland in 1921, while the east became Soviet Belarus. The Polish National District with its capital in Dzyarzhynsk was located in the Soviet-controlled part of the current oblast in the interwar period.

The Minsk region was established on 15 January 1938, based on the amendment of the Constitutional Law of the USSR. As of 20 February 1938, the area included 20 districts. Following the Soviet invasion of Poland on September 17, 1939 at the start of World War II, the former eastern lands of the Second Polish Republic were annexed in accordance with the Molotov–Ribbentrop Pact partitioning Poland and added to the Minsk region.

On 20 September 1944, by the decree of the Presidium of the Supreme Soviet of the USSR, the Gressky, Kopyl, Krasnoslobodski, Luban, Slutsky, Starobin, Starodorozhski districts and the city of Sluck were removed from the Minsk region and transferred to the newly formed Bobruisk region.

On 8 January 1954, by the decree of the USSR Presidium of the Supreme Soviet, the Nesvizhski and Stolbtsovsky districts from the abolished Baranovichi region, as well as the Glusk, Gressky, Kopyl, Krasnoslobodski, Luban, Slutsky, Starobin, Starodorozhski districts and the city of Sluck from the abolished Bobruisk region, were added to the Minsk region.

In 1960, following the abolition of Molodechno region, its southern part became the northern part of the Minsk region.

== Tourism ==
The number of travel agencies in Minsk region grew from twelve in 2000 to seventy in 2010. The most popular tourist destinations of the region are Zaslavskoye Lake, the Zhdanovichi area which has health resorts, Nesvizh Palace and its surroundings, as well as the alpine ski resorts of Lahojsk and Silichy.

== Administrative subdivisions ==
The Minsk region comprises 22 districts (raions), 307 selsovets, 22 cities, 8 city municipalities, and 20 urban-type settlements.

=== Districts of Minsk region ===
- Barysaw District
- Byerazino District
- Chervyen District
- Dzyarzhynsk District
- Kapyl District
- Kletsk District
- Krupki District
- Lahoysk District
- Lyuban District
- Maladzyechna District
- Minsk District
- Myadzyel District
- Nyasvizh District
- Pukhavichy District
- Salihorsk District
- Slutsk District
- Smalyavichy District
- Staryya Darohi District
- Stowbtsy District
- Uzda District
- Valozhyn District
- Vilyeyka District

=== Cities and towns ===
Population of cities and towns in Minsk region according to 2023 estimates:

English	Belarusian	Russian	Pop. (2023)
Barysaw	Барысаў	Борисов	136,409
Salihorsk	Салігорск	Солигорск	98,590
Maladzyechna	Маладзечна	Молодечно	89,268
Zhodzina	Жодзiна	Жодино	64,000
Slutsk	Слуцк	Слуцк	60,376
Dzyarzhynsk	Дзяржынск	Дзержинск	29,811
Vilyeyka	Вілейка	Вилейка	26,811
Smalyavichy	Смалявічы	Смолевичи	21,820
Maryina Horka	Мар'іна Горка	Марьина Горка	20,242
Fanipal	Фаніпаль	Фаниполь	17,768
Stowbtsy	Стоўбцы	Столбцы	17,640
Zaslawye	Заслаўе	Заславль	17,419
Nyasvizh	Нясвіж	Несвиж	15,907
Lahoysk	Лагойск	Логойск	15,515
Byerazino	Беразіно	Березино	11,395
Lyuban	Любань	Любань	11,360
Kletsk	Клецк	Клецк	11,350
Staryya Darohi	Старыя Дарогі	Старые Дороги	10,972
Uzda	Узда	Узда	10,677
Chervyen	Чэрвень	Червень	10,542
Kapyl	Капыль	Копыль	10,087
Valozhyn	Валожын	Воложин	10,064
Krupki	Крупкі	Крупки	8,487
Myadzyel	Мядзел	Мядель	6,999

== Demographics ==
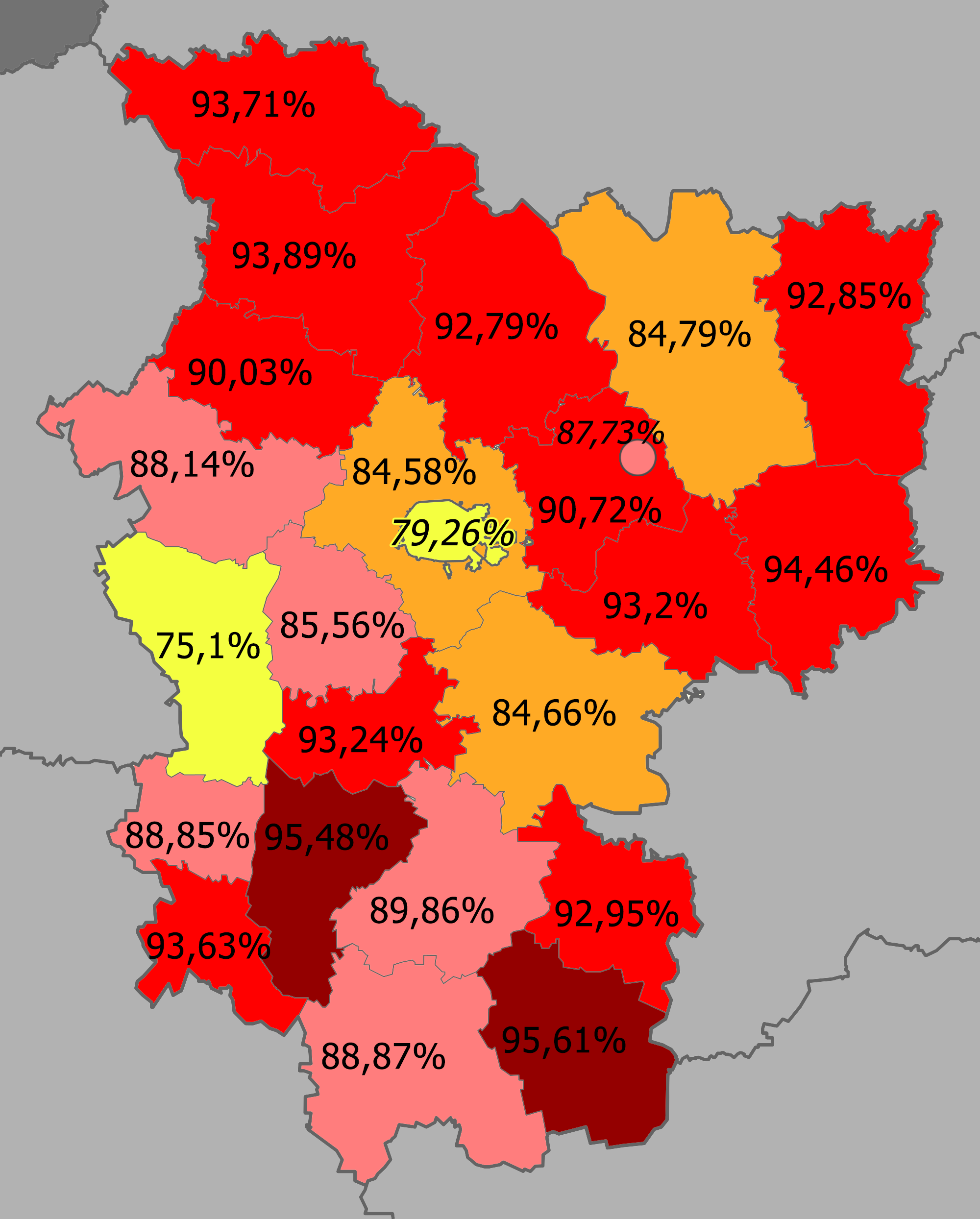
Belarusians in the region
>95%
90–95%
85—90%
80–85%
<80%

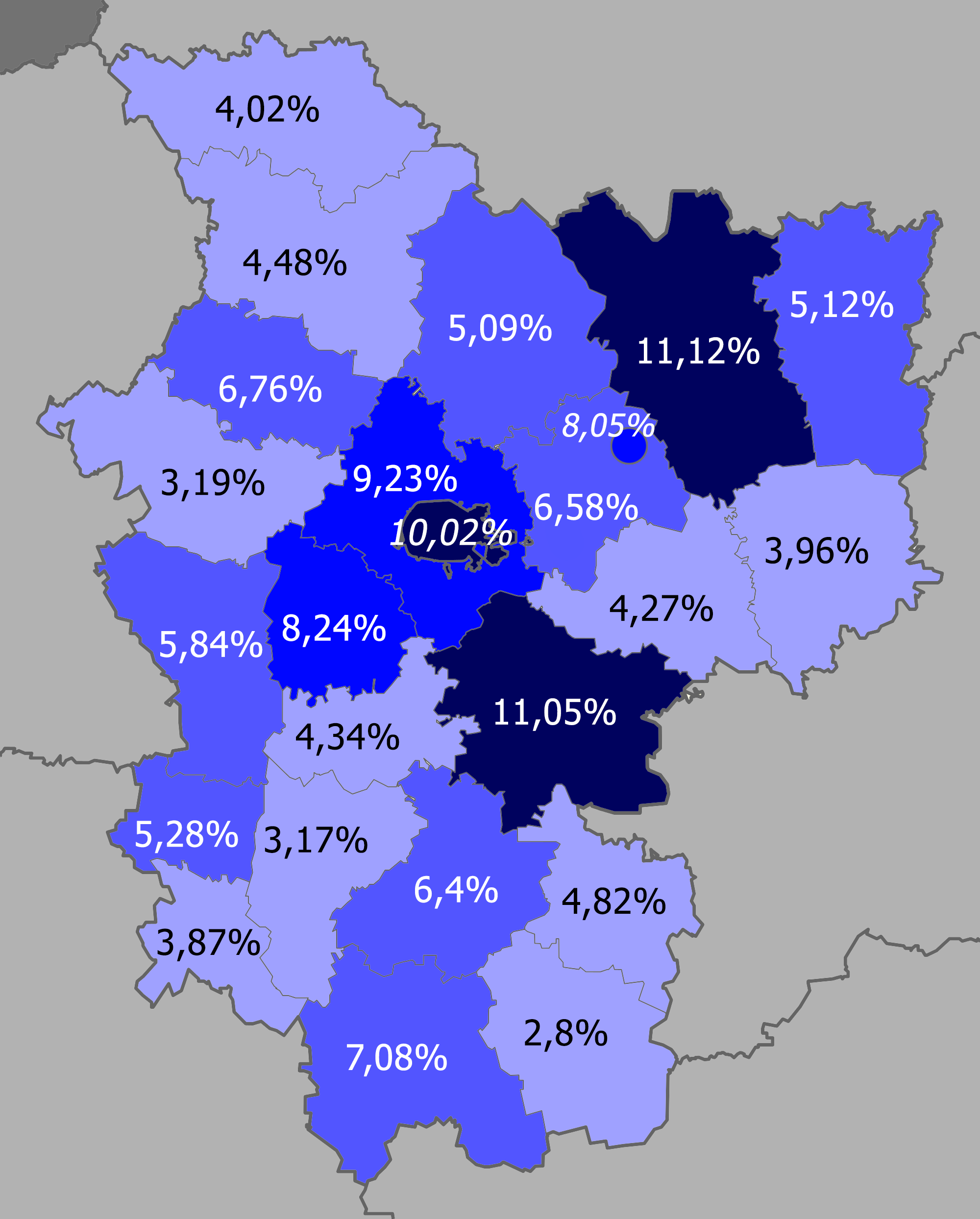
Russians in the region
>10%
8–10%
5–8%
<5%

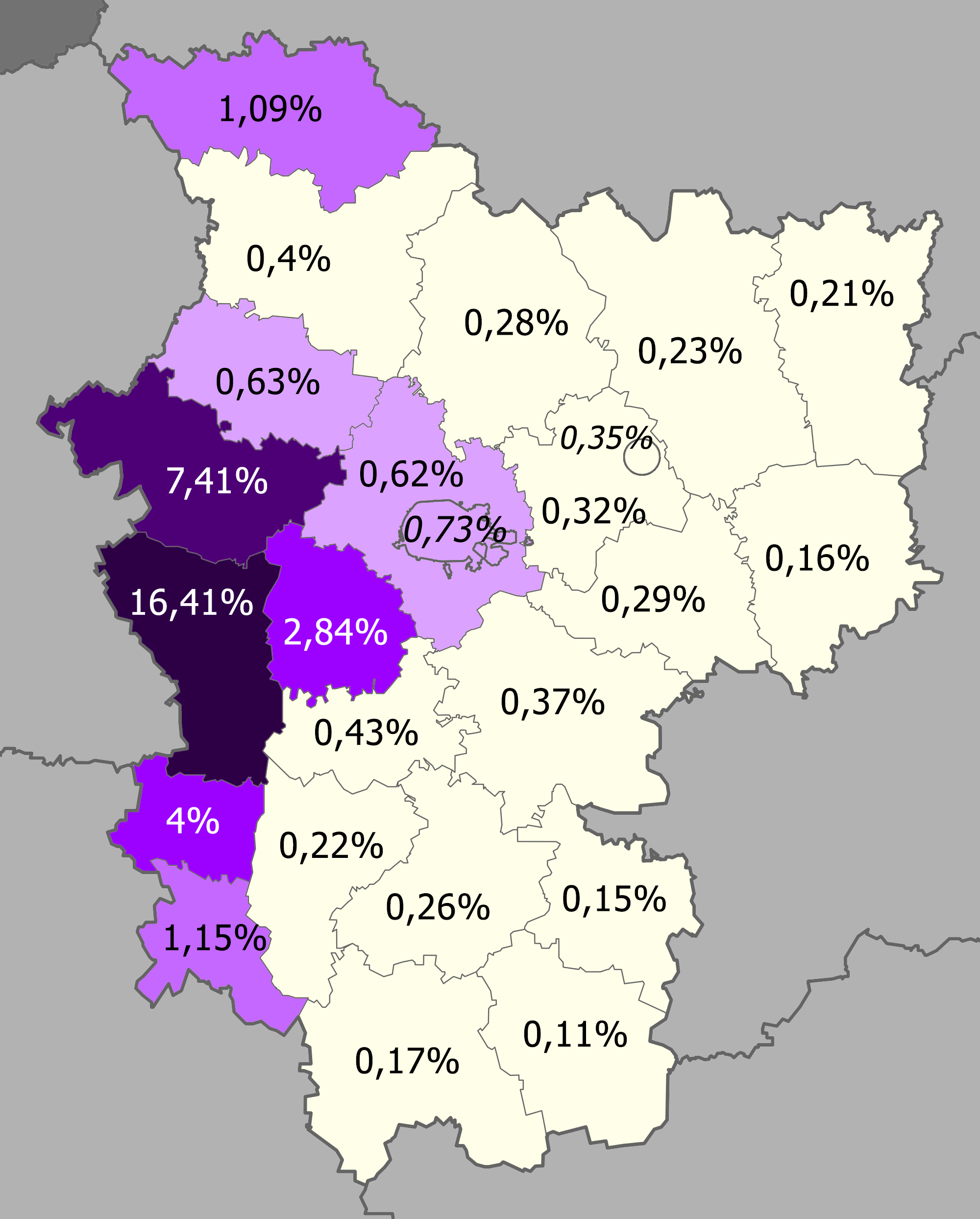
Poles in the region
>15%
5–15%
2–5%
1–2%
0.5–1%
<0.5%
