= Operation Hornung =

1943 German anti-partisan operation in Belarus

- Part of World War II
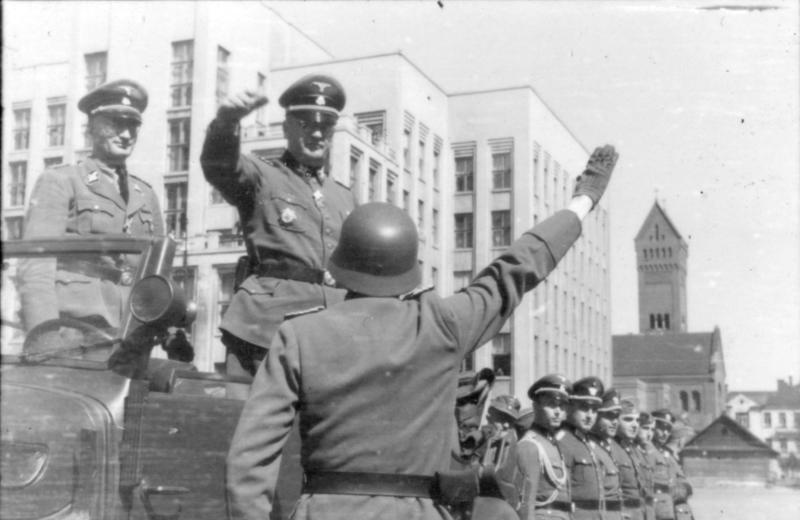
- Erich von dem Bach-Zelewski and Ordnungspolizei in Minsk, ca 1943.
Date	February 8–26, 1943
Location	Hancewicze, Morocz, Lenin, Łuniniec, Belarus
Result	German victory

Belligerents
Germany: Russian Volunteers	(Byelorussian Soviet Socialist Republic) Belarusian partisans

Commanders and leaders
Oskar Dirlewanger; Franz Magill; Siegfried Binz	Vasily Korzh

Strength
Dirlewanger Special Battalion, Russian company, Combat Group Binz, Einsatzgruppe B with the collaborator battalion Rodionov	Unknown

Casualties and losses
29 killed 133 weapons captured	12,897 partisans killed

Operation Hornung (German: Unternehmen Hornung, referring to an old German name for February) was an anti-partisan operation during the Occupation of Belarus by Nazi Germany, carried out in February 1943. It was directed against the area Hancewicze-Morocz-Lenin-Łuniniec, a thinly populated area of about 4,000 square kilometers southwest of Słuck on the southern border of the Regional Commissariat White Ruthenia. It came in the sequence of three actions (including Erntefest I and Erntefest II) that had taken place in January further to the northeast, in the area of Słuck-Osipowicze; it claimed over 12,000 victims.

== Background ==
The aim of this operation, carried out by Curt von Gottberg, was to prevent any further advance of partisans from the northern Polesie region who had entered the Regional Commissariat White Ruthenia and the Reichskommissariat Ukraine, from the east and to prevent damage to the Brześć-Homel railway along the Prypeć River; domination of this area was of key importance. According to the reconnaissance reports of the commander of Sicherheitspolizei and SD Minsk, a careful estimate suggested a population of 10,000 people and a number of 'bandits', a total in the order of 34,000 men. Allegedly, there existed a veritable Soviet republic with command offices, centers of recruitment and the military training of young men; also, new sports arenas, churches and schools. The population of the area was from the start saddled with collective liability and its extermination was planned. 'Given the current weather it must be expected that in all villages of the mentioned area the bandits have found shelter', was the feeble justification of the Dirlewanger Special Battalion. Two members of a propaganda company sent as observers, put it rather more clearly: In order to keep the bands from once more gaining a foothold in this area, the order had been issued to turn this area into a no man's land.

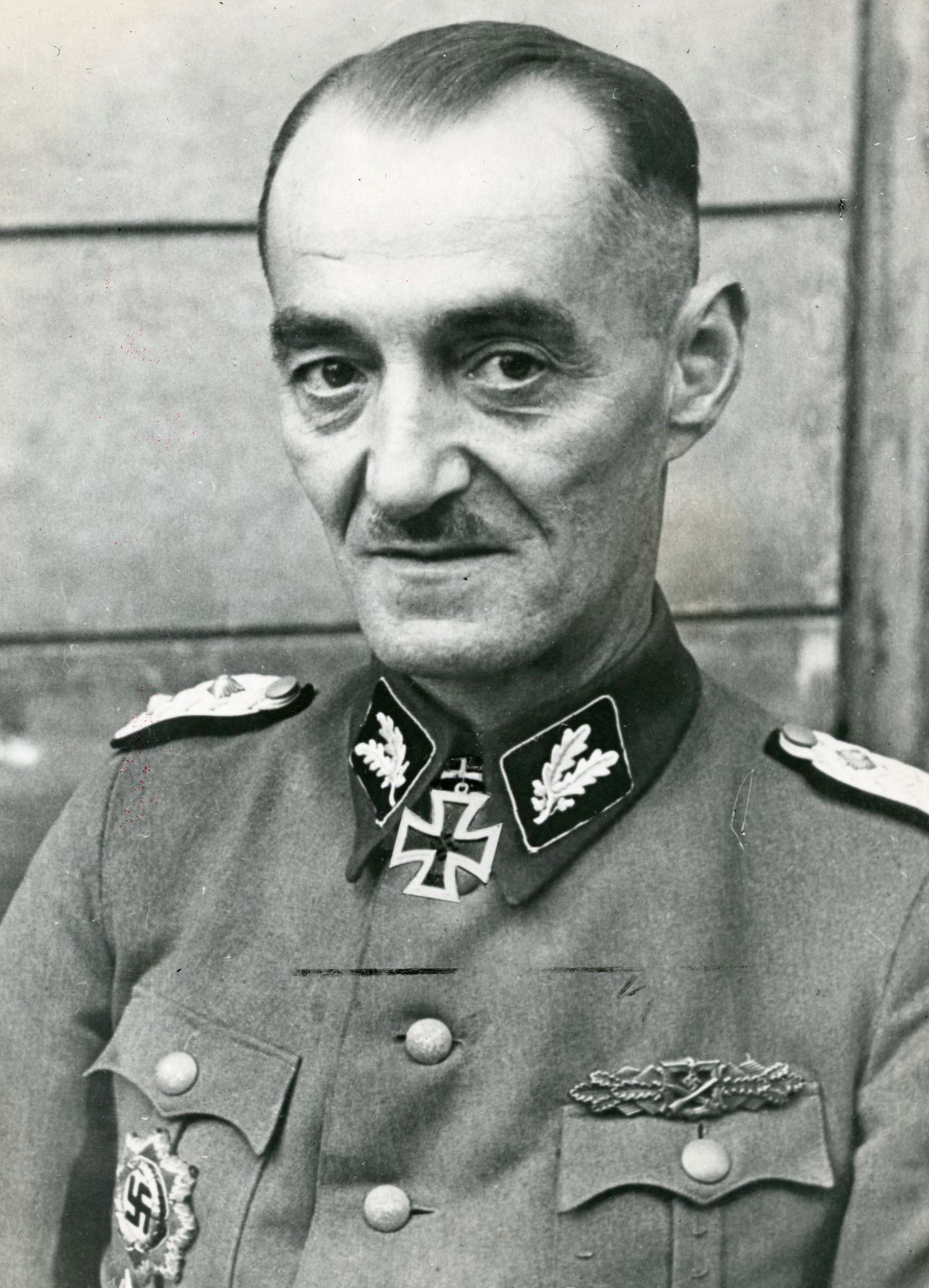
Oskar Dirlewanger in 1944.

== The Operation ==
The preamble of Operation Hornung was the destruction of the Słuck ghetto on February 8, 1943 by the almost completely employed unit of the commander of security police and SD Minsk with the help of several other police units. They murdered more than 3,000 people there. Within the following week, the area of the operation was concentrically crossed by 13 battalions and numerous smaller units of the participating forces in five combat groups. The population, which was to be murdered at the end of the operation, was pacified with the assurance that only actual partisans were being targeted. But there was hardly any fighting. On February 14/15, the tactic was changed, as had been established already before the operation, and the last and in this case longest phase began. The wounded Oskar Dirlewanger was replaced by Franz Magill, the deputy commander of Special Battalion Dirlewanger, who issued the following order:

The battalion is to again comb through the combat zone of February 15 to February 17 up to the line Starobin-Powarczycze. Everything that may give shelter or protection is to be destroyed. The area is to become no mans land. All inhabitants are to be shot. Cattle, grain and other products are to be taken and delivered to Starobin. The Russian company is to go back into the combat zone and destroy everything and lead the cattle out in a northerly direction. The sled column is to be kept so far from the location to be destroyed that the civilian drivers are not present at the executions.

Combat Group Binz of Police Regiment 23 (SS-Polizei Regiment 23) issued the following radio message:

The radical destruction of all buildings, even the smallest and most remote and the destruction of all persons not required to drive cattle or collect agricultural products where possible (flachs); the area is to become no mans land. The commander of combat group north takes complete responsibility for this.

The order had not been issued by a major of the Schutzpolizei (gendarmerie), Siegfried Binz, however, but at a higher level. At first there had been a total collection of agricultural products for the final phase of the operation, which boded no good for the population. All participating combat groups in the operation area adopted this procedure, not only Combat Group Binz. Last but not least, Erich von dem Bach-Zelewski, according to his own statements, arrived at the (Headquarters of?) Combat Group Staff von Gottberg on February 15 probably a day earlier, and thus in time to give the order himself or at least be present when it was issued. Until then, apart from the Jews of Słuck, 2,483 people had been killed. This was also one of the first operations in which the SS-Special Battalion Dirlewanger took part since Bach-Zelewski had put it at von Gottberg's disposal. Its deputy commander, Magill, was head of SS for special tasks at Bach-Zelewski's staff and had been specifically detached to von Gottberg. Magill thus had the chance to continue in this region what he had already begun with the SS Cavalry Regiment 2 in 1941. Other units taking part in Operation Hornung included a detachment of Einsatzgruppe B with the collaboration of the Rodionov battalion, which in turn came from the rear area of Army Group Centre and was noted for its brutality. The contemporary Wehrmacht commander in White Ruthenia, Bronislaw Pawel, stated that the immediate direction of the operation had been carried out by von Gottberg but that the overall direction had resided with Bach-Zelewski.

== Extermination ==
Various sources and accounts describe the subsequent extermination campaign. Two Wehrmacht propagandists reported the attempt to transform the area into a no-man's-land by systematically slaughtering the population of villages and farms, including every infant. All houses were burned, and cattle and food supplies were confiscated and removed from the area. They also noted the widespread panic, which even affected the seasoned Belarusian auxiliary policemen, who continued to discuss the events months later.

A particularly strong impression was left by accounts from members of the former Drushina I Battalion, who in February were witnesses to extermination actions against the Russian civilian population south of Słuck.

Descriptions of German cruelty, for instance cramming women and children into burning houses, spread rapidly among the civilian population.

Survivors from this region have movingly described how they felt when placed inside a dead zone. Gana Michalowna Grincewicz remembered: In my fear it seemed to me that no one was left in the world, that all had been killed.

This action stands out for the extermination of many large villages by the Germans. 1,046 people died in Lenin, 780 in Pusiczi, 787 in Adamowo and 426 in Kopacewiczi. A final total of 12,718 dead, among them 3,300 Jews, (from Słuck), were recorded. Only 65 prisoners were mentioned. Indeed, the SS and police deported only 72 people as a labor force in the course of fighting in the Regional Commissariat White Ruthenia in February 1943. Between November 1942 and March 1943, no more than 3,589 persons had been made available to the so-called Sauckel Commission in the course of eleven major operations, during which at least 33,378 people were murdered.
