= Khorastava rural council =

Rural council of Belarus

Khorastava rural council Хорастаўскі сельсавет (Belarusian) Хоростовский сельсовет (Russian)
- Rural council
- Interactive map of Khorastava rural council
- Coordinates: 52°29′53″N 27°16′59″E
- Region: Minsk
- District: Salihorsk
- Rural council: Khorastava

Population (2019)
  - Total: 1,203
- Time zone: UTC+3 (MSK)

Khorastava rural council (Belarusian: Хорастаўскі сельсавет; Russian: Хоростовский сельсовет) is a lower-level subdivision (selsoviet) of Salihorsk district, Minsk region, Belarus. Its administrative center is the agrotown of Khorastava.

== History ==
Khorastava rural council was established in 1939. On January 14, 1963 it was transferred from Lyuban district, Minsk region to Luninyets district, Brest region. On April 30, 1965 it was transferred from Luninyets district to Salihorsk district.

Five kilometers to the east of the village of Chalanets there was a village Yamnoye, Ямное (Yamnaye, Ямнае), which was burned down together with 84 residents by the Germans during World War II on February 14, 1943. A memorial mark for the mass grave was installed there.

== Geography ==
The administrative unit borders Hotski and Dowhawski rural councils of the district.

== Notable residents ==
- Vasily Korzh (1899–1967), Soviet partisan was born in Khorastava. A monument to Korzh was erected in Khorastava in 1975 and later a bust by Korzh Street was installed in 1994.
