= Damanavichy rural council =

Damanavichy rural council is a lower-level subdivision (selsoviet) of Salihorsk district, Minsk region, Belarus. Its administrative center is Damanavichy.
