= Krasnadvortsy rural council =

Krasnadvortsy rural council is a lower-level subdivision (selsoviet) of Salihorsk district? Minsk region, Belarus. Its administrative center is Krasnadvortsy.
