= Starobin rural council =

Subdivision of Minsk region, Belarus

Starobin rural council is a lower-level subdivision (selsoviet) of Salihorsk district, Minsk region, Belarus. Its administrative center is Starobin.
