= Khorastava =

Agrotown in Minsk region, Belarus

Khorastava Хорастава (Belarusian) Хоростово (Russian)
- Agrotown
- Location within Belarus
- Coordinates: 52°29′53″N 27°16′59″E
- Country: Belarus
- Region: Minsk region
- District: Salihorsk district

Population (2003)
  - Total: 917
- Time zone: UTC+3 (MSK)

Khorastava (Note: Belarusian: Хорастава, romanized: Chorastava; Russian: Хоростово, romanized: Khorostovo, Polish: Chorostów.) is an agrotown in Salihorsk district, Minsk region, Belarus. It serves as the administrative center of Khorastava rural council. It is situated 49 kilometres (30 mi) from Salihorsk and 180 kilometres (110 mi) from the capital Minsk. In the interbellum it was located in Second Polish Republic, in the Polesie Voivodeship, in the Łunin County, in the Sosnkowicze commune. In 2003, it had a population of 917.

== Notable people ==
- Vasily Korzh (1899–1967), Soviet partisan
