= Zazhevichy rural council =

Zazhevichy rural council is a lower-level subdivision (selsoviet) of Salihorsk district, Minsk region, Belarus. Its administrative center is Zazhevichy.
