= Chorostów =

Chorostów is a Polish village name, now known as:

- Khorastava, agrotown in Salihorsk district, Minsk region, Belarus
- Khvorostiv, a village in Volodymyr Raion, Volyn Oblast, Ukraine

== See also ==
- Chorostków
- Chorostecki
