= Kapatsevichy rural council =

Kapatsevichy rural council is a lower-level subdivision (selsoviet) of Salihorsk district, Minsk region, Belarus. Its administrative center is Novapalyeski.
