= Chyrvonaya Slabada rural council =

Chyrvonaya Slabada rural council is a lower-level subdivision (selsoviet) of Salihorsk district, Minsk region, Belarus. Its administrative center is Chyrvonaya Slabada.
