= Chyzhevichy rural council =

Coordinates: 52°49′40″N 27°30′04″E

Chyzhevichy rural council is a lower-level subdivision (selsoviet) of Salihorsk district, Minsk region, Belarus. Its administrative center is agrotown Zhabin.
