= House of Crafts, Hantsavichy =

Coordinates: 52°45′34″N 26°26′09″E

House of Crafts
- Established: 1997
- Location: Hantsavichy, Belarus
- Type: Ethnographic museum
- Director: Marharyta Salanievič
- Website: http://gnckult.by/dom-remesel

The Hantsavichy District House of Crafts (Belarusian: Ганцавіцкі раённы Дом рамёстваў, romanized: Hancavicki rajonny Dom ramiostvaŭ) was established in Belarus in 1997 to study, revive and develop folk crafts.

== History ==
The House of Crafts has worked since 1997 and groups artisans of Hantsavichy District who work in the field of traditional crafts.

== Aims and functions ==
=== Aims ===
- to support and create conditions for natural existence and revival of local folk craft traditions;
- competent collection, storage, classification and systematisation of traditional crafts of Hantsavichy District.

== Activities ==
Research work: expeditions around the district to gather materials about crafts and their current state.

Methodical fund: the House of Crafts provides methodical and practical help to rural culture institutions in organization and conducting of workshops in arts and crafts, collects and classifies materials on the modern types of arts and crafts, informs leaders of study groups, cultural workers and all interested parties.

Weaving, embroidery and belt weaving groups work under the House of Crafts.

== Collection ==
A rich collection of traditional ručnik and items of local clothes has been gathered in the House of Crafts since its foundation. The collection of woven ručnik numbers nearly 50 items.

== Awards ==
- Special award of the President of Belarus for workers of culture and arts for revival and preservation of folk crafts and awaking youth's interest to traditional culture (2011)
- І place of VI Republican Fair-Festival of Crafts "Viasnovy Bukiet" (2014)
- І place of VII Republican Fair-Festival of Crafts "Viasnovy Bukiet" (2015)

== Participation in celebrations, fairs and festivals ==
- Slavianski Bazar International Art Festival (Vitebsk, 2008)
- Republican Day of Belarusian Literature (Hants, 2011)
