= Starobin, Belarus =

Urban-type settlement in Minsk Region, Belarus

Starobin Старобін (Belarusian) Старобин (Russian)
- Urban-type settlement
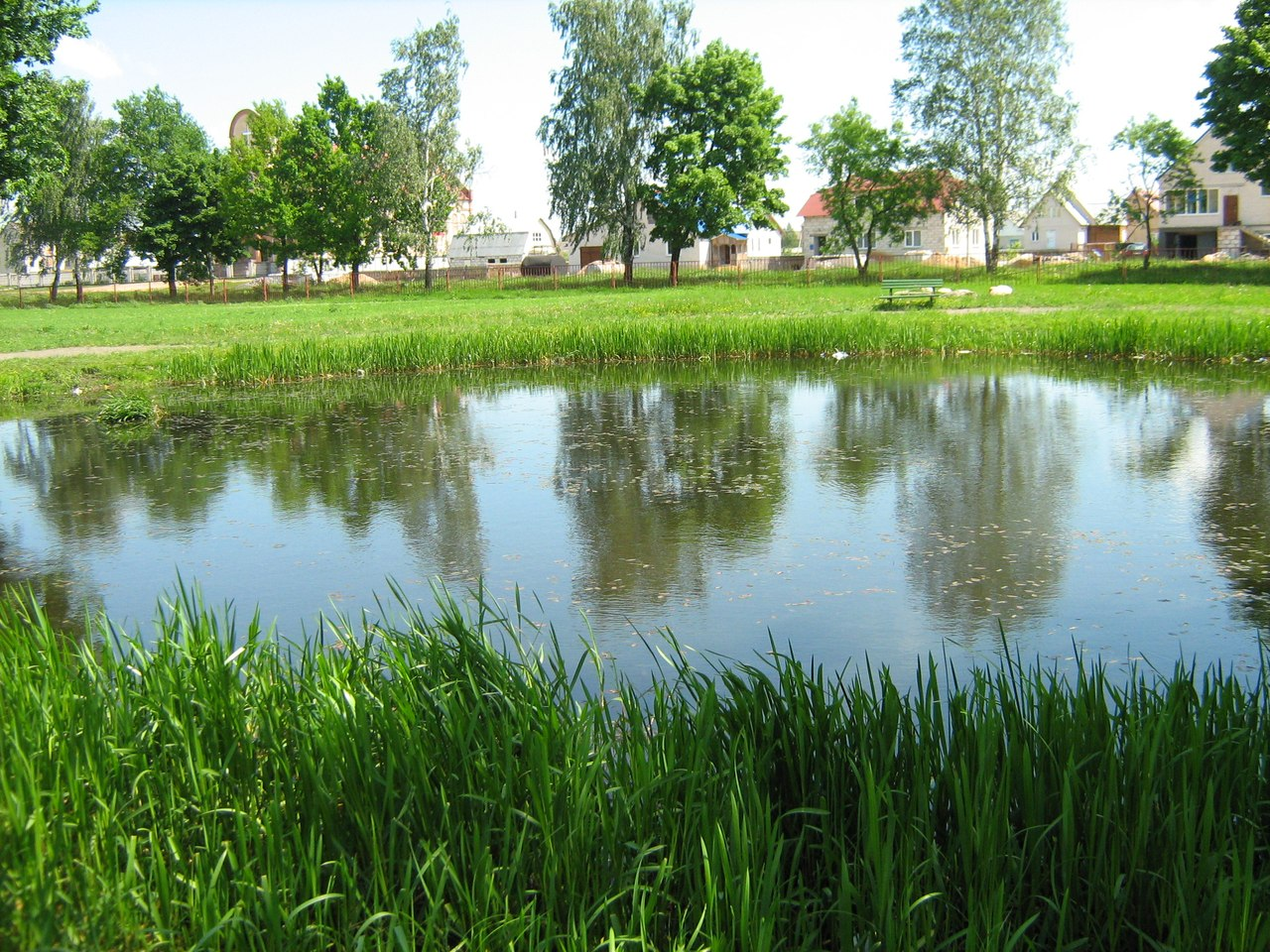

- Location within Belarus
- Coordinates: 52°44′N 27°28′E
- Country: Belarus
- Region: Minsk Region
- District: Salihorsk District

Population (2026)
  - Total: 6,418
- Time zone: UTC+3 (MSK)

Starobin (Belarusian: Старобін; Russian: Старобин) is an urban-type settlement in Salihorsk District, Minsk Region, Belarus. It serves as the administrative center of Starobin rural council. It is situated 12 kilometres (7.5 mi) from Salihorsk and 145 kilometres (90 mi) from the capital Minsk. As of 2026, it has a population of 6,418.

== History ==
Starobin is known from the 16th century as a part of the Principality of Slutsk within the Grand Duchy of Lithuania. Following its incorporation into the Russian Empire, Starobin had a population of 496 in 1886.

From 1924 to 1962, it served as the administrative center of Starobin District. In 1938, it received the status of urban-type settlement. It was part of Lyuban District from 1962 and then Salihorsk District from 1965.

=== World War II ===
During World War II, Starobin was under German occupation from 26 June 1941 until the summer of 1944. It was administered as part of Generalbezirk Weißruthenien within Reichskommissariat Ostland. Prior to the war, there were 1,210 Jews residing in Starobin, making up 35.43 percent of the population.

The first Aktion took place on 18–19 July 1941, according to Soviet sources, when a motorized detachment of the Wehrmacht shot 372 Jewish men. Numerous mass shootings occurred during the occupation, with the 150 to 200 Jews who survived the various shootings in August 1941 being placed in a ghetto. The ghetto was finally liquidated in the spring of 1943, with only one Jewish family surviving before they were murdered by the Germans in 1944 as they retreated.

== Sources ==
- Megargee, Geoffrey P.; Dean, Martin (4 May 2012). The United States Holocaust Memorial Museum Encyclopedia of Camps and Ghettos, 1933 –1945: Volume II: Ghettos in German-Occupied Eastern Europe. Indiana University Press. pp. 1284–1286. ISBN 978-0-253-00202-0.
- Ramanovich, Z. V. (2002). "Старобін". Беларуская энцыклапедыя: У 18 т. Т. 15: Следавікі-Трыо (in Belarusian). Mìnsk: Беларуская энцыклапедыя. p. 161. ISBN 985-11-0251-2.
