= Dowhaye rural council =

Dowhaye rural council is a lower-level subdivision (selsoviet) of Salihorsk district, Minsk region, Belarus. Its administrative center is Dowhaye.
