= Hotsk rural council =

Hotsk rural council is a lower-level subdivision (selsoviet) of Salihorsk district, Minsk region, Belarus. It contains a single populated place, an agrotown of Hotsk.
