= Chyrvonaya Slabada =

Urban-type settlement in Minsk Region, Belarus

Chyrvonaya Slabada Чырвоная Слабада (Belarusian) Красная Слобода (Russian)
- Urban-type settlement
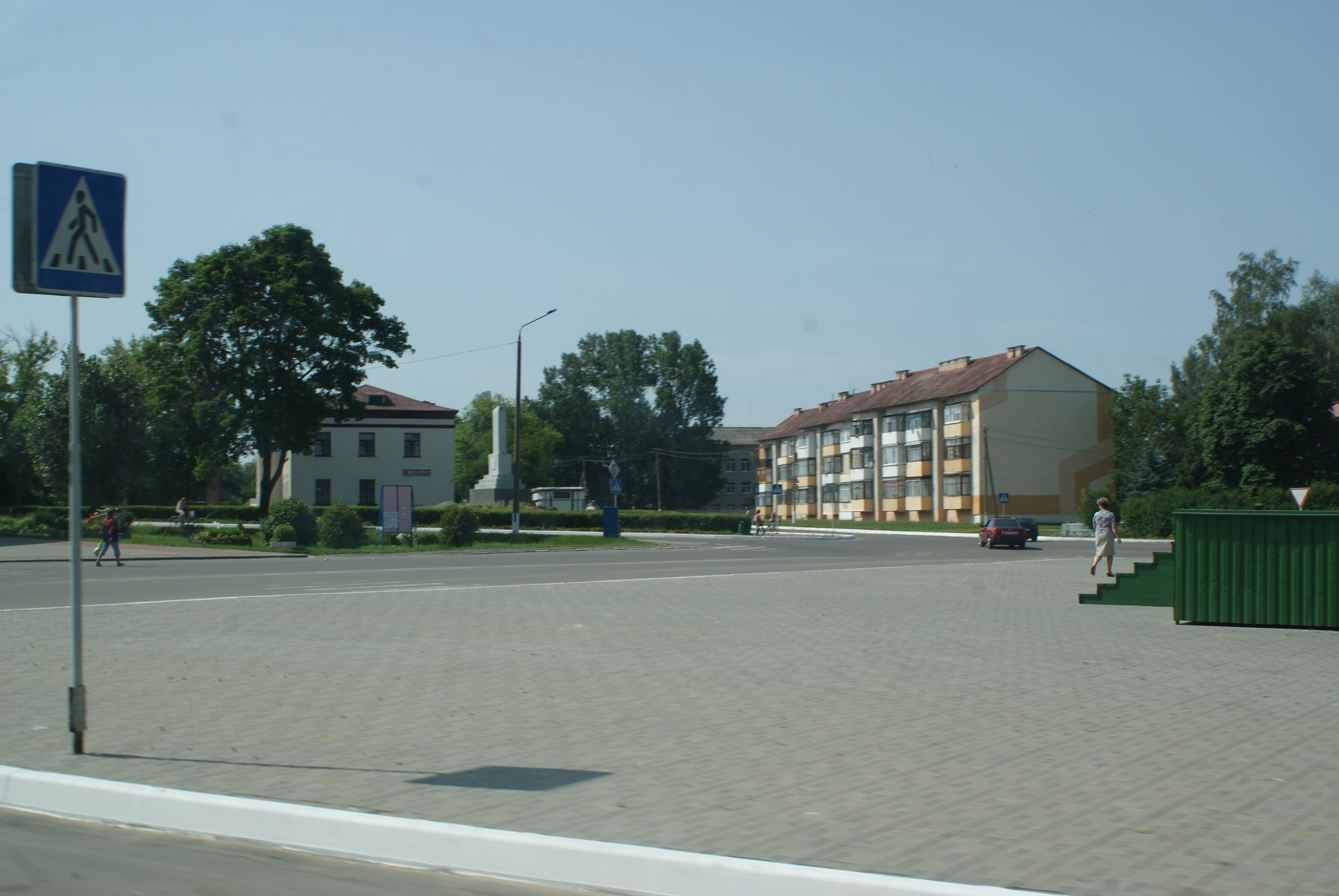

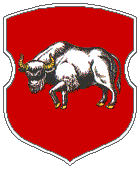
- Coat of arms

- Location within Belarus
- Coordinates: 52°51′N 27°09′E
- Country: Belarus
- Region: Minsk Region
- District: Salihorsk District

Population (2026)
  - Total: 3,866
- Time zone: UTC+3 (MSK)

Chyrvonaya Slabada (Belarusian: Чырвоная Слабада, romanized: Čyrvonaja Slabada; Russian: Красная Слобода, romanized: Krasnaya Sloboda), formerly known as Vyzna (Вызна) until 1923, is an urban-type settlement in Salihorsk District, Minsk Region, Belarus. It serves as the administrative center of Chyrvonaya Slabada rural council. As of 2026, it has a population of 3,866.
