= Hantsavichy district =

District of Brest region, Belarus

Hantsavichy district Ганцавіцкі раён (Belarusian)
- District
- Flag Coat of arms

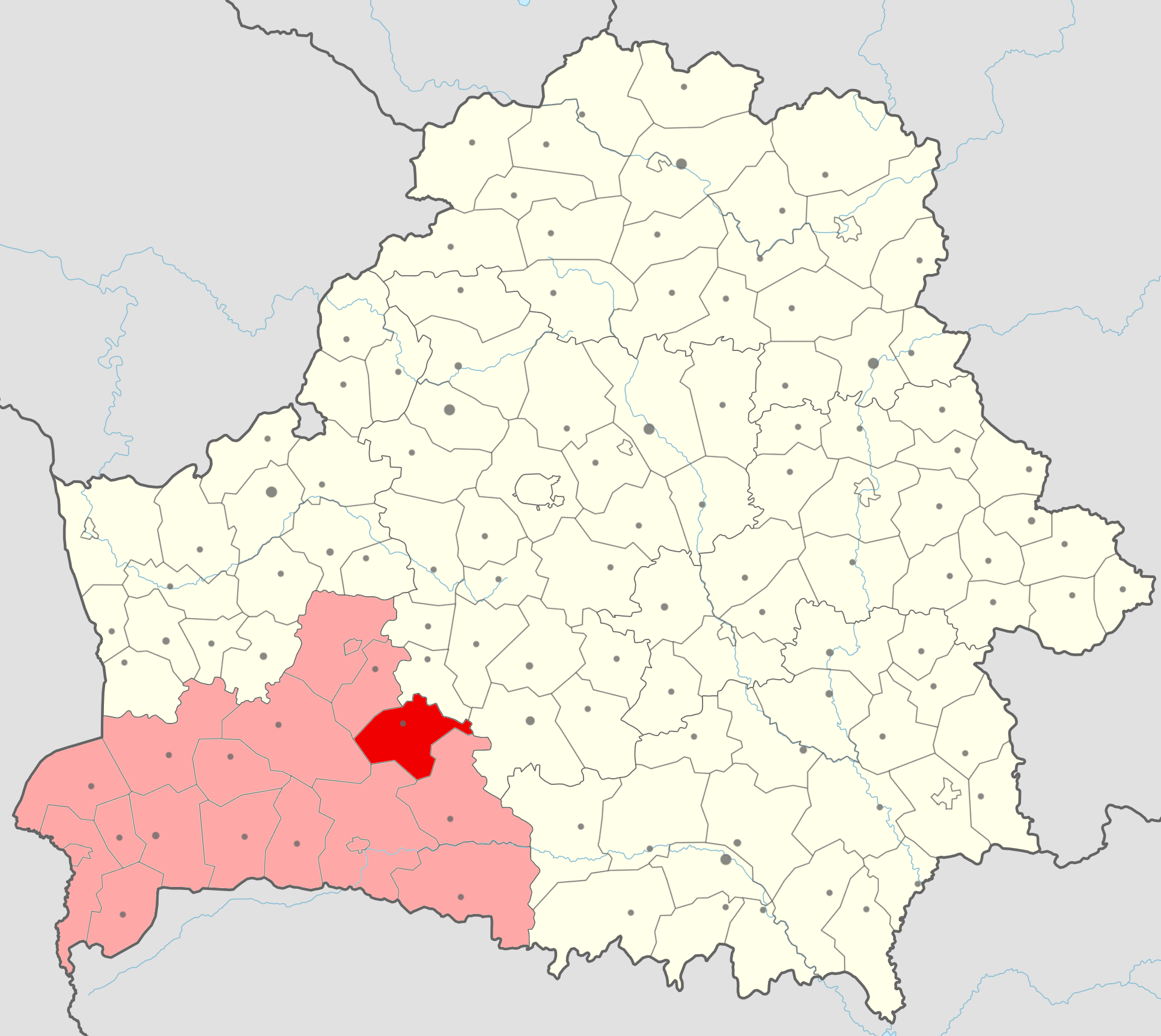
- Coordinates: 52°45′30″N 26°25′53″E
- Country: Belarus
- Region: Brest region
- Formed: January 15, 1940
- Administrative center: Hantsavichy

Area
  - District: 1,709.58 km^{2} (660.07 sq mi)

Population (2024)
  - District: 24,327
  - Density: 14.230/km^{2} (36.855/sq mi)
  - Urban: 13,355
  - Rural: 10,972
- Time zone: UTC+3 (MSK)
- Website: gantsevichi.brest-region.gov.by

Hantsavichy district or Hancavičy district (Belarusian: Ганцавіцкі раён; Russian: Ганцевичский район) is a district (raion) of Brest region in Belarus. Its administrative center is Hantsavichy. As of 2024, it has a population of 24,327.

== Demographics ==
At the time of the 2009 Belarusian census, Hantsavichy district had a population of 31,170. Of these, 95.6% were of Belarusian, 2.2% Russian, 1.2% Polish and 0.6% Ukrainian ethnicity. 90.5% spoke Belarusian and 8.5% Russian as their native language. In 2023, it had a population of 24,774.

== See also ==
- House of Crafts, Hantsavichy
