= Hantsavichy =

Town in Brest Region, Belarus

Hantsavichy Ганцавічы (Belarusian) Ганцевичи (Russian)
- Town
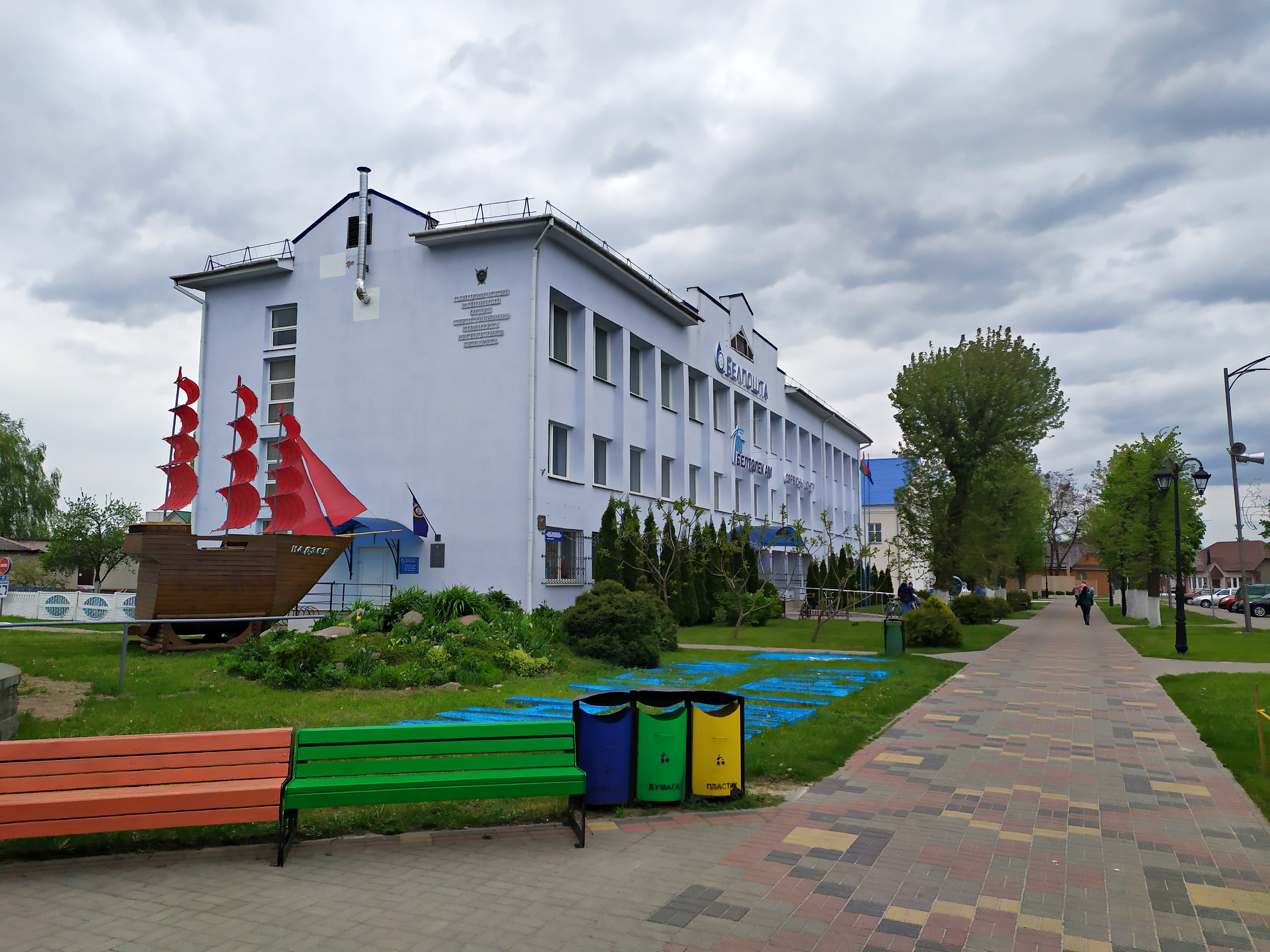

- Coat of arms

- Location within Belarus
- Coordinates: 52°51′27″N 26°28′55″E
- Country: Belarus
- Region: Brest Region
- District: Hantsavichy District
- Founded: 1898

Population (2026)
  - Total: 13,155
- Time zone: UTC+3 (MSK)
- Postal code: 225432
- Area code: +375 1646
- License plate: 1

Hantsavichy or Gantsevichi (Note: Belarusian: Ганцавічы, romanized: Hantsavičy, IPA: [ˈɣant͡savʲitʂɨ]; Russian: Ганцевичи, IPA: [ˈɡantsəvʲɪtɕɪ]; Polish: Hancewicze.) is a town in Brest Region, Belarus. It serves as the administrative center of Hantsavichy District. As of 2026, it has a population of 13,155.

The Hantsavichy Radar Station is a part of the Russian early warning radar system.

== Etymology ==
According to Belarusian toponymist Vadzim Žučkievič, the name Hantsavichy comes from the surname Hantsavich.

== History ==
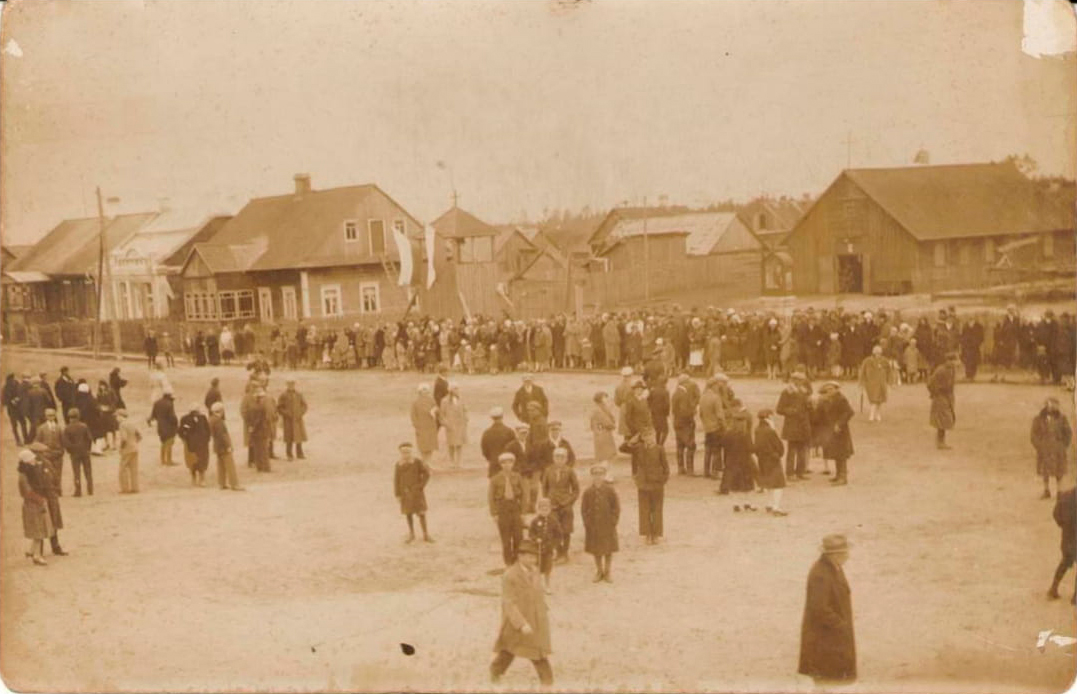
3 May Constitution Day celebrations in 1934

In the interwar period, Hancewicze, as it was called in Polish, was administratively located in the Łuniniec County in the Polesie Voivodeship of Poland.

Before World War II, 60% of the population was Jewish. In the 1920s and 1930s there were four synagogues, a Jewish library, an orphanage, a Tarbut school and school in Yiddish.

=== World War II ===
Following the invasion of Poland in September 1939, it was first occupied by the Soviet Union and annexed to the Byelorussian Soviet Socialist Republic. From June 30, 1941 to July 7, 1944, it was under German occupation.

From June 30 to July 1, 1941, a pogrom occurred in which 16 Jews were murdered. On August 15, 1941, 350 Jewish men were executed in the forest 11 kilometres (6.8 mi) away from Hantsavichy. 600 Jews were shot in the town's market place. During another action 1,000 Jewish men were taken to the forest one kilometre (0.62 mi) away and shot dead. A concentration work camp was established in November 1941. Besides the local Jews, there were 230 Lenin Jews and 120 native to Pogost. Small executions of 70-150 Jews took place constantly. During one of those executions, 100 Jewish refugees from Warsaw, along with two local families, Fish and Zeiger, were executed and buried in the Peski ravine. On August 14, 1942, more than 300 Jews fled the camp and others were shot. In all, during the occupation, 3,500 Jews were murdered by the Nazis in the district of Hantsavichy, including 1,500 women and 850 children.

== Climate ==
Climate data for Hantsavichy (1991–2020)
Month	Jan	Feb	Mar	Apr	May	Jun	Jul	Aug	Sep	Oct	Nov	Dec	Year
Record high °C (°F)	5.4 (41.7)	7.6 (45.7)	15.0 (59.0)	23.3 (73.9)	27.7 (81.9)	30.1 (86.2)	31.2 (88.2)	30.9 (87.6)	26.3 (79.3)	20.5 (68.9)	12.9 (55.2)	7.0 (44.6)	31.2 (88.2)
Mean daily maximum °C (°F)	−1.1 (30.0)	0.4 (32.7)	5.9 (42.6)	13.8 (56.8)	19.6 (67.3)	22.8 (73.0)	24.7 (76.5)	24.1 (75.4)	18.4 (65.1)	11.6 (52.9)	4.6 (40.3)	0.2 (32.4)	12.1 (53.8)
Daily mean °C (°F)	−3.6 (25.5)	−2.8 (27.0)	1.4 (34.5)	8.0 (46.4)	13.6 (56.5)	17.2 (63.0)	18.9 (66.0)	17.9 (64.2)	12.7 (54.9)	7.1 (44.8)	2.1 (35.8)	−2.0 (28.4)	7.5 (45.5)
Mean daily minimum °C (°F)	−6.0 (21.2)	−5.6 (21.9)	−2.4 (27.7)	2.5 (36.5)	7.5 (45.5)	11.1 (52.0)	13.1 (55.6)	11.9 (53.4)	7.6 (45.7)	3.2 (37.8)	−0.2 (31.6)	−4.3 (24.3)	3.2 (37.8)
Record low °C (°F)	−20.0 (−4.0)	−17.8 (0.0)	−12.1 (10.2)	−4.9 (23.2)	−0.4 (31.3)	4.1 (39.4)	7.3 (45.1)	5.1 (41.2)	−0.7 (30.7)	−5.2 (22.6)	−9.9 (14.2)	−15.3 (4.5)	−20.0 (−4.0)
Average precipitation mm (inches)	39.1 (1.54)	34.7 (1.37)	36.6 (1.44)	41.2 (1.62)	66.4 (2.61)	78.3 (3.08)	94.8 (3.73)	58.7 (2.31)	50.2 (1.98)	46.4 (1.83)	44.9 (1.77)	42.1 (1.66)	633.4 (24.94)
Average precipitation days (≥ 1.0 mm)	9.7	9.4	8.7	7.4	9.9	10.2	10.7	7.3	7.1	7.9	9.0	9.9	107.2
Source: NOAA

== Population ==
- 1897 – 633;
- 1909 – 1,026;
- 1970 – 5,200;
- 1973 – 6,900;
- 1991 – 14,500;
- 2006 – 14,700;
- 2008 – 14,800;
- 2015 – 14,043;
- 2024 – 13,355;
- 2025 – 13,248;
- 2026 – 13,155.

== Education ==
There are 3 schools, 1 gymnasium, agricultural lyceum and a special boarding school in Hantsavichy.
