= Rural councils of Belarus =

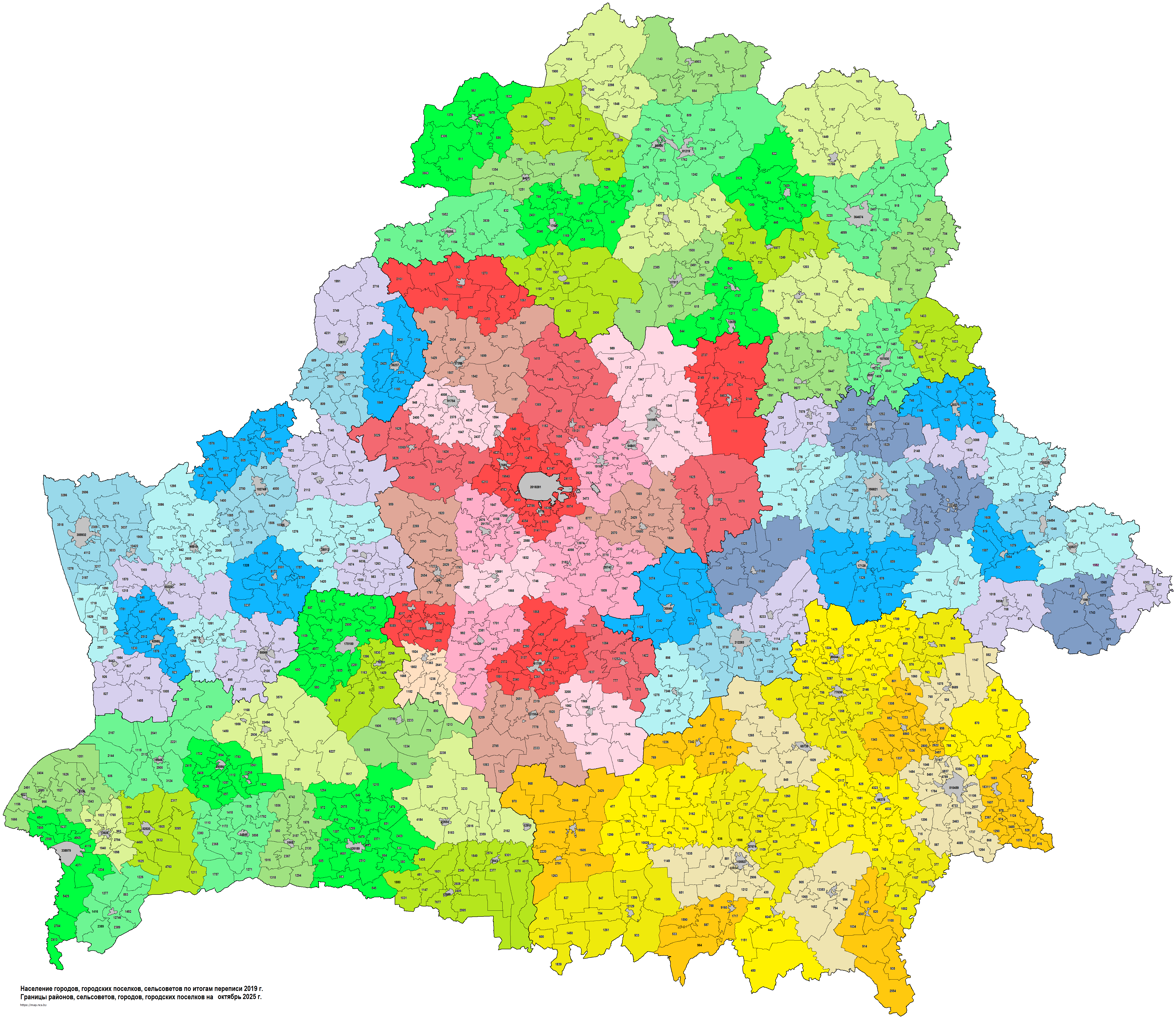
All administrative divisions of Belarus, April 2025

Rural councils of Belarus (Belarusian: сельсаветы, Russian: сельсоветы, selsoviets) are the lowest-level rural territorial units of the country. They are subordinated to districts of Belarus. If a rural council includes agrotowns, then one of them is the administrative center of the rural council, with some exceptions.

The system was introduced in 1924, when the whole Soviet Union replaced its administrative division inherited from the Russian Empire.

According to the 2009 Belarusian census, the numbers of rural councils were:

- Brest region: 222
- Gomel region: 259
- Grodno region: 178
- Minsk region: 294
- Mogilev region: 192
- Vitebsk region: 200

According to the 2019 Belarusian census, the numbers of rural councils were:

- Brest region: 195
- Gomel region: 242
- Grodno region: 155
- Minsk region: 216
- Mogilev region: 152
- Vitebsk region: 191
