= Vasily Korzh =

Soviet Belarusian military leader

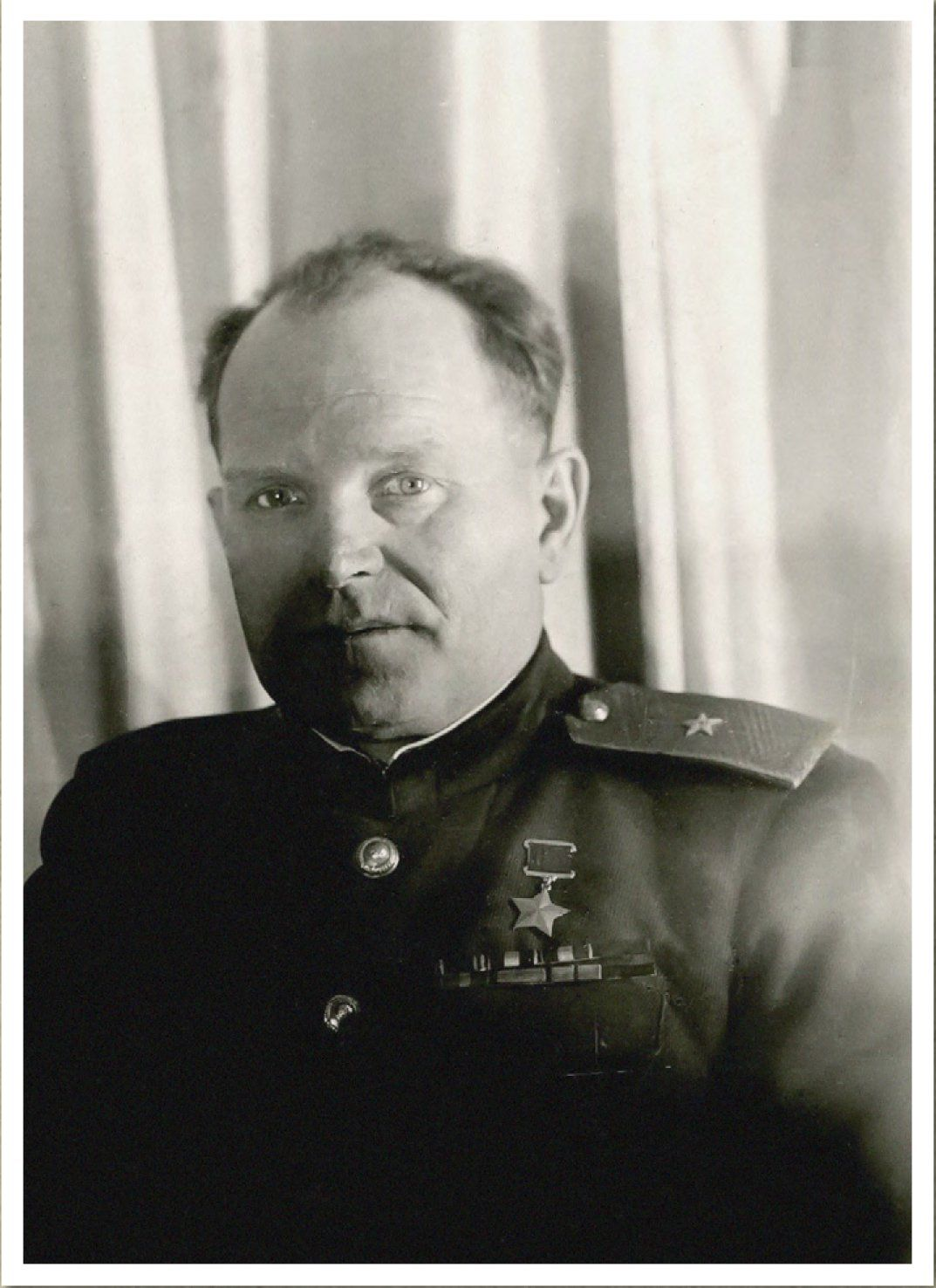
- Born: 13 January 1899; Khorostovo, Russian Empire (now Belarus)
- Died: 5 May 1967 (aged 68) Minsk, Byelorussian SSR, Soviet Union
- Allegiance: Soviet Union
- Conflicts: Spanish Civil War; Second World War; Operation Bagration

Vasily Zakharovich Korzh (Belarusian: Васіль Захаравіч Корж, Russian: Василий Захарович Корж; 13 January 1899 – 5 May 1967), also known under the Soviet partisan nom de guerre Komarov, was a Soviet Byelorussian communist activist, partisan, and one of the leaders of the Belarusian resistance during World War II.

A kolkhoz chairman, NKVD officer, and volunteer with the Spanish Republican forces in the Spanish Civil War, he is best remembered for organizing and leading one of the first Soviet partisan units during the 1941-1944 occupation of the Byelorussian Soviet Socialist Republic by Nazi Germany.

On account of his partisan service, Korzh was made a major general of the Red Army in 1943 and was awarded the honorary title Hero of the Soviet Union in August 1944.

== Biography ==
Born into a peasant Belarusian family in Khorostovo (south of Minsk, then part of the Russian Empire) in 1899, Korzh spent his early years assisting his family's toils on the agricultural lands owned by the noble House of Golitsyn.

A supporter of the communist cause, Korzh participated in the guerrilla struggles of the pro-Soviet Belarusian anti-Polish resistance movement in the 1920s in Western Byelorussia (first occupied by Józef Piłsudski and then officially ceded to the Second Polish Republic after the 1921 Treaty of Riga in the aftermath of the 1919-1921 Polish-Soviet War). He had initially been conscripted into the Polish Army during the conflict, but deserted from it after a fight with a Polish commander, provoked by the abuse inflicted on the Belarusian soldiers in the army's ranks.

Arriving in the Soviet Union in 1925, Korzh began working in agriculture and became a kolkhoz chairman after organizing the first peasants' commune in the village of Metyavichi, though not yet a member of the All-Union Communist Party. After joining the party's ranks in 1929, Korzh went on to join the NKVD in 1931. He left in 1936 in order to fight as a volunteer with the International Brigades on the side of the leftist Spanish Republicans against the Nationalist forces of Francisco Franco in the Spanish Civil War, returning to the Soviet Union in 1939 as a decorated fighter. He managed a sovkhoz in 1939-1940 and became head of the local Communist Party's Pinsk Region organization in 1940.

Korzh began organizing resistance cells in western Belarus immediately after the invasion of the Soviet Union by Nazi Germany on 22 June 1941. Within a month, Korzh's unit was already battling the German troops, having first engaged the German tanks accompanying the 293rd Wehrmacht Infantry Division on 28 June.

Having served out most of the war in the rank of "brigade commander" or "kombrig" among the Soviet partisans (the Red Army also had not fully transitioned to the traditional officer ranks' system by the beginning of the German invasion), he was made a major general in 1943. He subsequently was recognized with the honorary title of Hero of the Soviet Union on 15 August 1944, during the last days of Operation Bagration, the Red Army's successful effort to liberate the remaining German-held Byelorussian territory.

Korzh received his discharge from the military on account of poor health in 1946. He subsequently worked as an assistant to the Forestry Minister of the Byelorussian Soviet Socialist Republic in 1949–1953, before returning to the Byelorussian countryside from Minsk in 1953. Upon his return, he was again elected as kolkhoz chairman of a Belarusian village.

Korzh died on 5 May 1967.

== Honours and awards ==
- Hero of the Soviet Union
- Two Orders of Lenin
- Two Orders of the Red Banner
- Order of the Patriotic War 1st class
- Order of the Red Star
- Medal "Partisan of the Patriotic War" 1st class
- Medal "For the Victory over Germany in the Great Patriotic War 1941–1945"
