= Salihorsk =

Town in Minsk Region, Belarus

Salihorsk Салігорск (Belarusian) Солигорск (Russian) Soligorsk
- Town
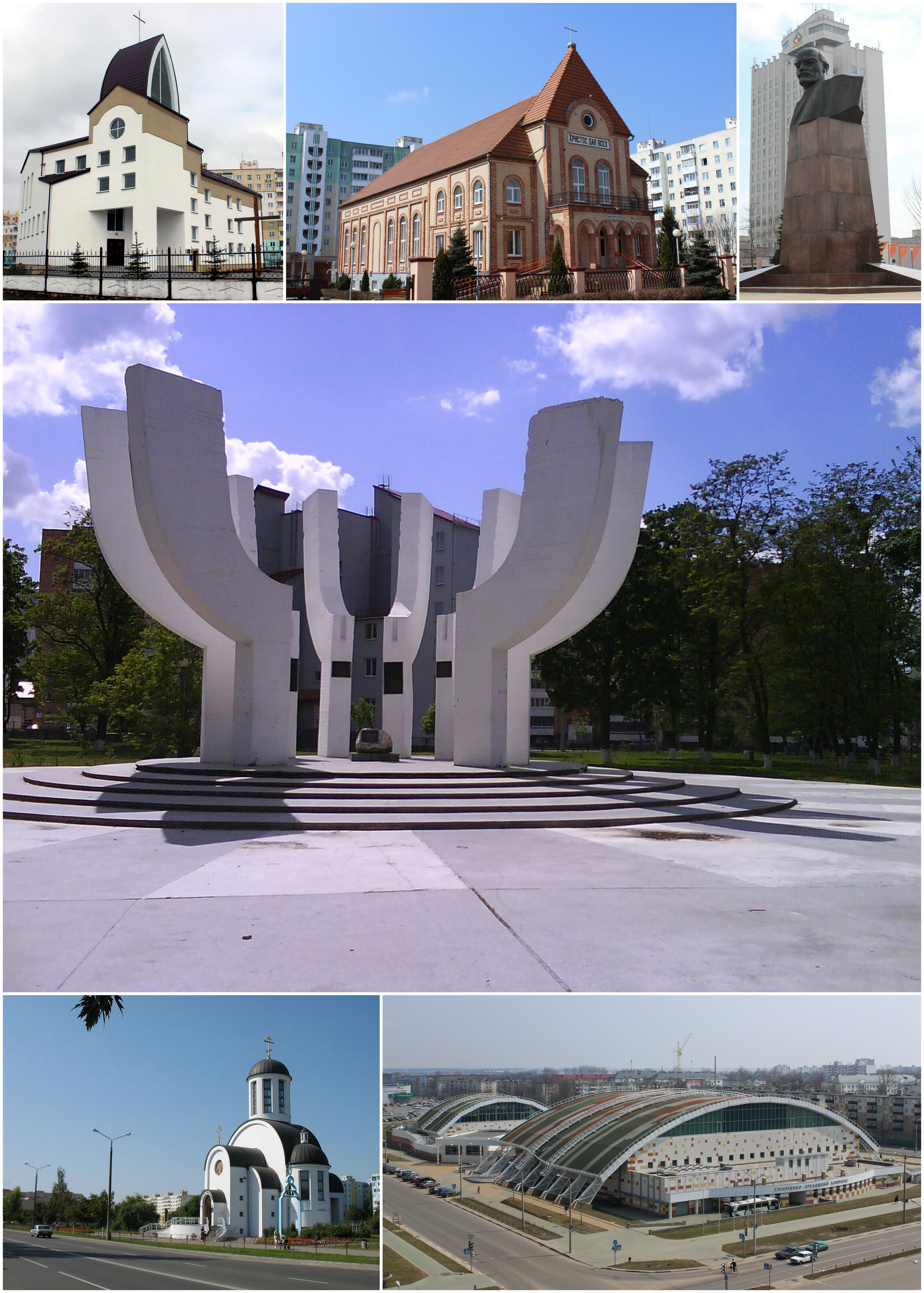

- Flag Coat of arms

- Location within Belarus
- Coordinates: 52°48′N 27°32′E
- Country: Belarus
- Region: Minsk Region
- District: Salihorsk District
- Founded: 1958

Area
  - Town: 9.19 km^{2} (3.55 sq mi)
- Elevation: 153 m (502 ft)

Population (2026)
  - Urban: 96,418
- Time zone: UTC+3 (MSK)
- Postal code: 223710
- Area code: +375 174
- License plate: 5
- Website: Official website

Salihorsk or Soligorsk (Belarusian: Салігорск, IPA: [salʲiˈɣorsk]; Russian: Солигорск, IPA: [səlʲɪˈɡorsk]) is a town in Minsk Region, Belarus. It serves as the administrative center of Salihorsk District. As of 2026, it has a population of 96,418.

== History ==
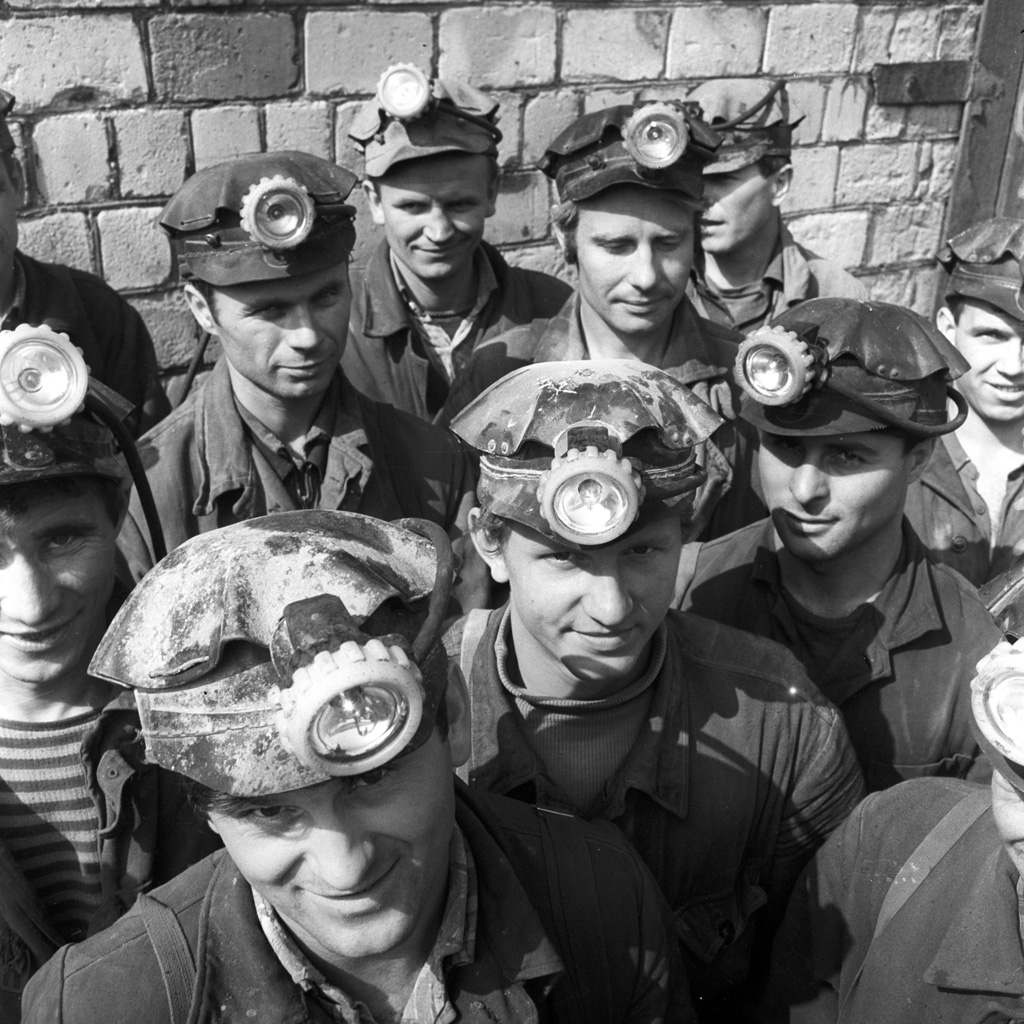
Workers of the Soligorsk potash plant, 1968

The city is one of the country's newest settlements; its construction began in 1958.

In May 1963, Salihorsk gained the status of a city/town (gorod), and by January 1964, the town already had more than 18,000 inhabitants.

In Dec 2002, Salihorsk hosted the Belarusian shooting championships.

== Geography ==
Salihorsk lies in the south of Minsk Region near Slutsk, around 120 km (75 mi) from Minsk.

== Demographics ==
Historical population

Year	Pop.	±%
1970	38,255	—
1979	65,148	+70.3%
1989	92,742	+42.4%
2006	101,253	+9.2%
2018	106,627	+5.3%

Year	Pop.	±%
2023	98,590	−7.5%
2024	97,818	−0.8%
2025	96,993	−0.8%
2026	96,418	−0.6%

== Sport ==
Salihorsk is the home city of Shakhtyor Soligorsk football club as well as HC Shakhtyor Soligorsk in the Belarusian Extraliga ice hockey league.

== Twin towns – sister cities ==
- Kohtla-Järve, Estonia
