= Lenin, Belarus =

Settlement in Belarus

Lenin Ленін
- Agrotown
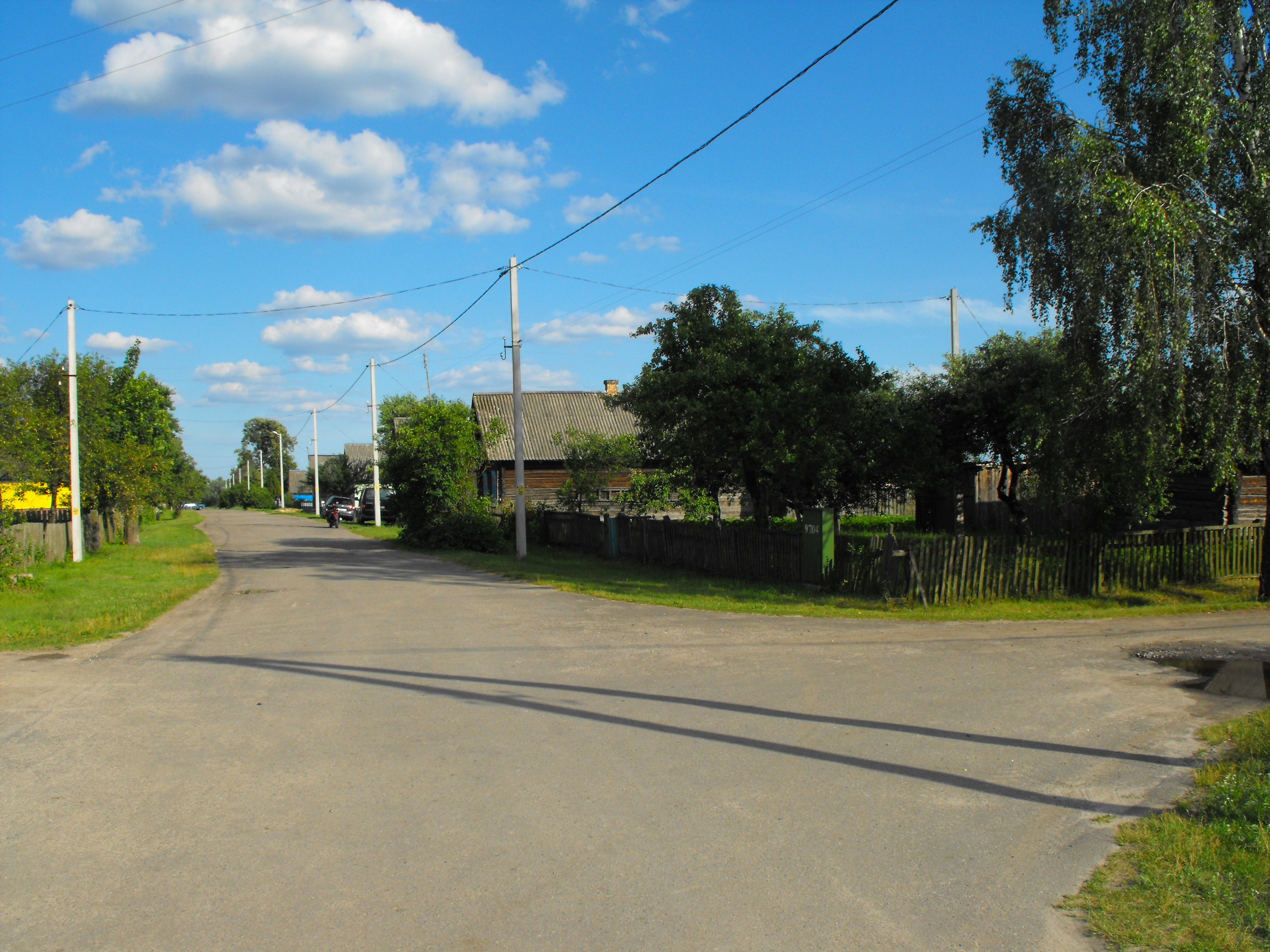

- Location within Belarus
- Coordinates: 52°26′N 27°30′E
- Country: Belarus
- Region: Gomel
- District: Zhytkavichy
- Time zone: UTC+3 (MSK)

Lenin (Belarusian: Ленін, Polish: Sosnkowicze) is an agrotown in the Gomel Region in southern Belarus.

== History ==
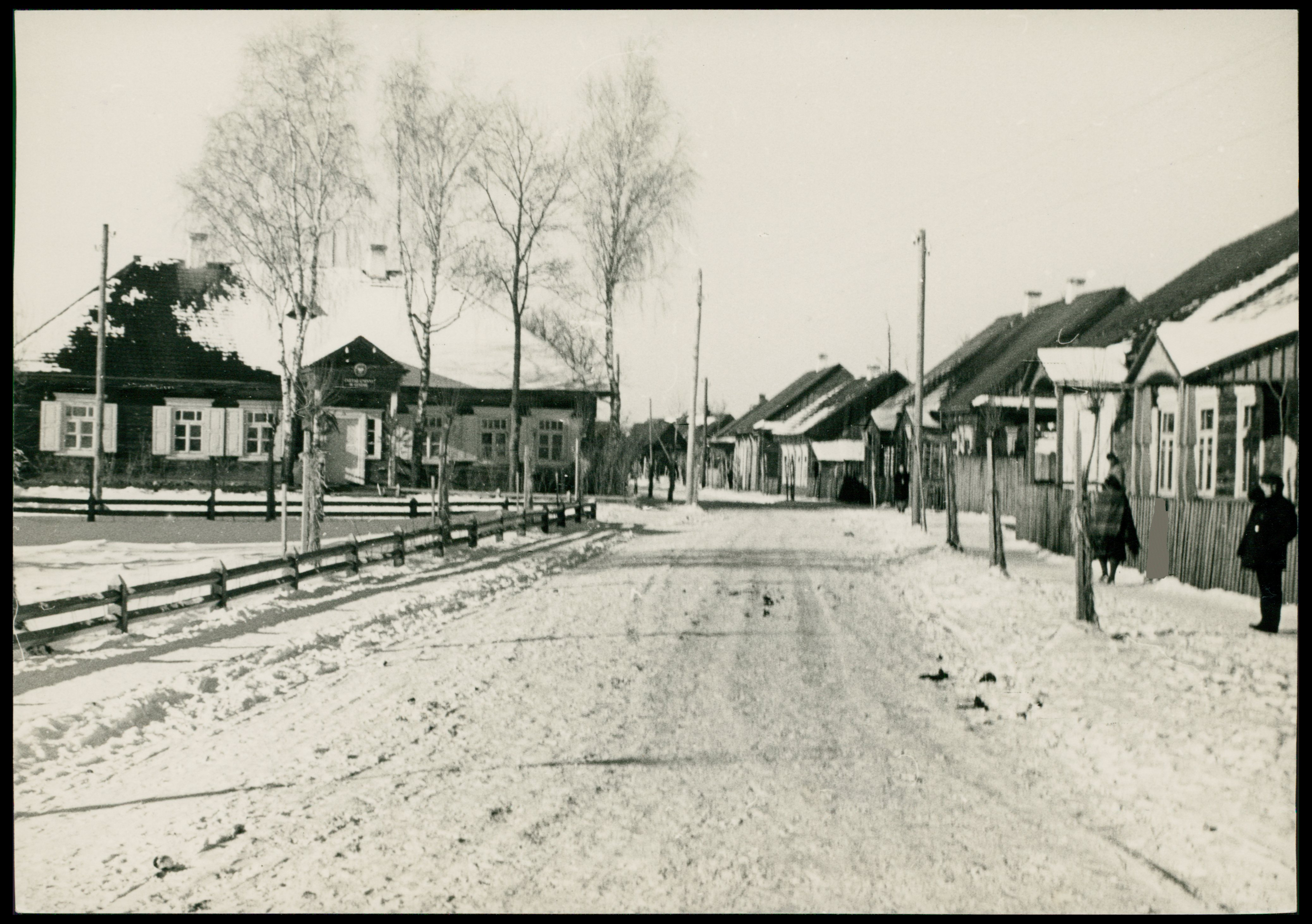
Lenin in the 1930s

Lenin was a private town of the Olelkowicz and Radziwiłł families, administratively located in the Nowogródek Voivodeship of the Polish–Lithuanian Commonwealth until the Partitions of Poland, when it was annexed by Russia, within which it was part of the Mozyrsky Uyezd in the Minsk Governorate. Following World War I, Lenin was part of reborn Poland, within which it was administratively located in the Łuniniec County in the Polesie Voivodeship. In May 1939, the settlement was renamed to Sosnkowicze.

Following the joint German-Soviet invasion of Poland, which started World War II in September 1939, the settlement was occupied by the Soviet Union until 1941, and then by Nazi Germany until 1944. The German occupiers subjected local Jews to forced labour, and in 1942 established a ghetto. On 14 August 1942, the occupiers committed a massacre of the Jews, keeping 28 alive to work for the Germans. In 1944 it was re-occupied by the Soviet Union, which eventually annexed it from Poland in 1945.
