= Selsoviet =

Rural council in Russia and Belarus

A selsoviet (Belarusian: сельсавет, Łacinka: sielsaviet; Russian: сельсовет, romanized: sel'sovet, IPA: [sʲɪlʲsɐˈvʲet]) is the shortened name for Selsky soviet, i.e., rural council (Belarusian: се́льскi саве́т; Russian: се́льский сове́т, Ukrainian: Сільська рада, romanized: Silska rada). It has closely related meanings:

- The administration (soviet) of a certain rural area.
- The territorial subdivision administered by such a council.
- The building of the selsoviet administration.

Selsoviets were the lowest level of administrative division in rural areas in the Soviet Union. After the dissolution of the Soviet Union, they were preserved as a third tier of administrative-territorial division throughout Belarus, and many of the federal subjects of Russia.

A selsoviet is a rural administrative division of a raion (district) that includes one or several smaller rural localities and is in a subordination to its respective raion administration.

The name refers to the local rural self-administration, the rural soviet (council), a part of the Soviet system of administration. The head of a selsoviet is called chairman, who had to be appointed by higher administration.

== Soviet Union ==
A December 24, 1917 decree of Sovnarkom initiated the reform of the administrative division inherited from the Russian Empire by which all local power must belong to soviets of the corresponding level of hierarchy. The reform was finalized in 1924.

For a considerable period of Soviet history, passports of rural residents were stored in selsoviet offices, and people could not move outside their area of residence without the permission of selsoviet.

== Belarus ==
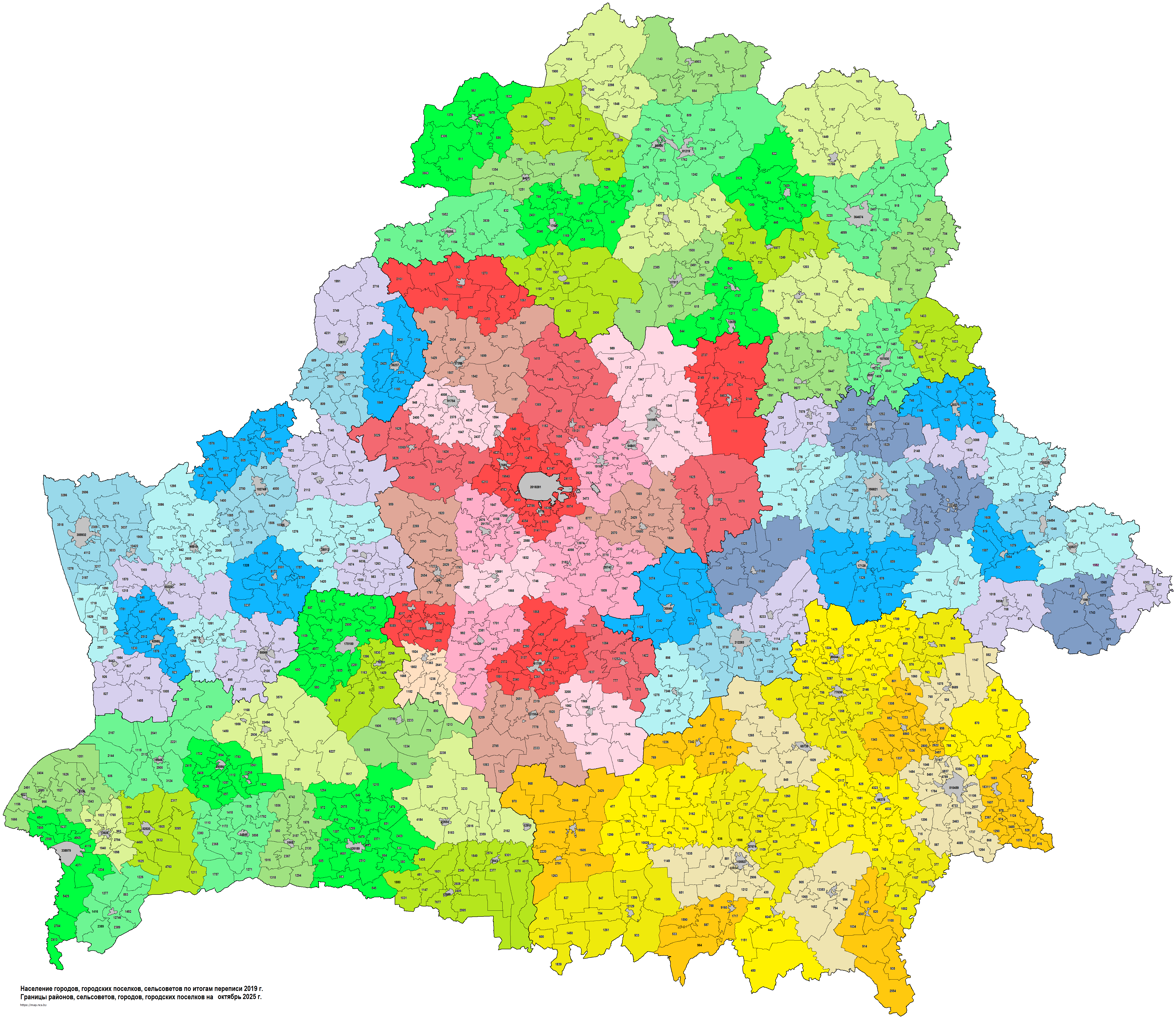
All administrative divisions of Belarus, April 2025

Rural councils of Belarus are subordinated to districts of Belarus. If a rural council includes agrotowns, then one of them is the administrative center of the rural council, with some exceptions.

The system was introduced in 1924, when the whole Soviet Union replaced its administrative division inherited from the Russian Empire.

== Russia ==
Division into selsoviets as administrative-territorial units remained after the dissolution of the Soviet Union in many of the federal subjects of Russia.

In modern Russia, a selsoviet is a type of an administrative division of a district in a federal subject of Russia, which is equal in status to a town of district significance or an urban-type settlement of district significance, but is organized around a rural locality (as opposed to a town or an urban-type settlement). In some federal subjects, selsoviets were replaced with municipal rural settlements, which, in turn, were granted status of administrative-territorial units.

Prior to the adoption of the 1993 Constitution of Russia, this type of administrative division had a uniform definition on the whole territory of the Russian SFSR. After the adoption of the 1993 Constitution, the administrative-territorial structure of the federal subjects is no longer identified as the responsibility of the federal government or as the joint responsibility of the federal government and the federal subjects. This state of the matters is traditionally interpreted by the governments of the federal subjects as a sign that the matters of the administrative-territorial divisions are the sole responsibility of the federal subjects themselves. As a result, the modern administrative-territorial structures of the federal subjects vary significantly from one federal subject to another; that includes the manner in which the selsoviets are organized and the choice of a term to refer to such entities.

As of 2013, the following types of such entities are recognized:

- Inhabited locality (населённый пункт): in Krasnoyarsk Krai (together with selsoviets)
- Rural administration (сельская администрация): in the Republic of Kalmykia and in Tula Oblast (together with rural okrugs, rural territories, and volosts)
- Rural administrative okrug (сельский административный округ): in Bryansk Oblast
- Rural okrug (сельский округ): in the Mari El Republic, the Republic of North Ossetia–Alania, and the Sakha Republic; in Krasnodar Krai (together with stanitsa okrugs); in Belgorod, Kaliningrad, Kirov, Omsk, Ryazan, Tula (together with rural administrations, rural territories, and volosts), Tyumen, Ulyanovsk, and Yaroslavl Oblasts
- Rural settlement (сельское поселение): in the Altai and the Chuvash Republics; in Amur, Moscow, Rostov, Smolensk, Tver, and Voronezh Oblasts
- Rural territory (сельская территория): in Kemerovo Oblast and Tula Oblast (together with rural administrations, rural okrugs, and volosts)
- Rural-type settlement administrative territory (административная территория – посёлок сельского типа): in the Komi Republic (together with selo administrative territories)
- Selo administrative territory (административная территория – село): in the Komi Republic (together with rural-type settlement administrative territories)
- Selsoviet (сельсовет): in the Republics of Bashkortostan, Buryatia (together with somons), Dagestan, Khakassia (together with settlement councils), Mordovia, and the Udmurt Republic; in Altai (together with settlement administrations), Krasnoyarsk (together with inhabited localities), and Stavropol Krais; in Arkhangelsk, Astrakhan, Chelyabinsk, Kurgan, Kursk, Lipetsk, Nizhny Novgorod, Orenburg (together with settlement councils), Oryol, Penza, Tambov, Volgograd, and Vologda Oblasts; in Nenets Autonomous Okrug (together with settlements)
- Settlement (поселение): in Kostroma and Novgorod Oblasts
- Settlement (посёлок): in Nenets Autonomous Okrug (together with selsoviets)
- Settlement administration (поселковая администрация): in Altai Krai (together with selsoviets)
- Settlement council (поссовет): in the Republic of Khakassia (together with selsoviets) and in Orenburg Oblast (together with selsoviets)
- Settlement municipal formation (муниципальное образование со статусом поселения): in Leningrad Oblast
- Somon (сомон): in the Republic of Buryatia (together with selsoviets)
- Sumon (сумон): in the Republic of Tuva
- Stanitsa okrug (станичный округ): in Krasnodar Krai (together with rural okrugs)
- Territorial okrug (территориальный округ): in Murmansk Oblast
- Volost (волость): in Pskov Oblast and Tula Oblast (together with rural administrations, rural okrugs, and rural territories)

== Ukraine ==
Post-Soviet concepts of "soviets" (rural, settlement) as territorial units were phased out during 2015–2020 Administrative-territorial reform in Ukraine (Адміністративно-територіальна реформа в Україні), according to the 2015 law "On Voluntary Association of Territorial Communities" (Ukrainian: Про добровільне об’єднання територіальних громад). and the term "рада" ("council") now refers only to the local government bodies in hromadas; se Local government in Ukraine.

== See also ==
- Municipal council
- Rural councils of Belarus
