= Salihorsk district =

District of Minsk region, Belarus

Salihorsk district Салігорскі раён (Belarusian) Солигорский район (Russian)
- District
- Flag Coat of arms

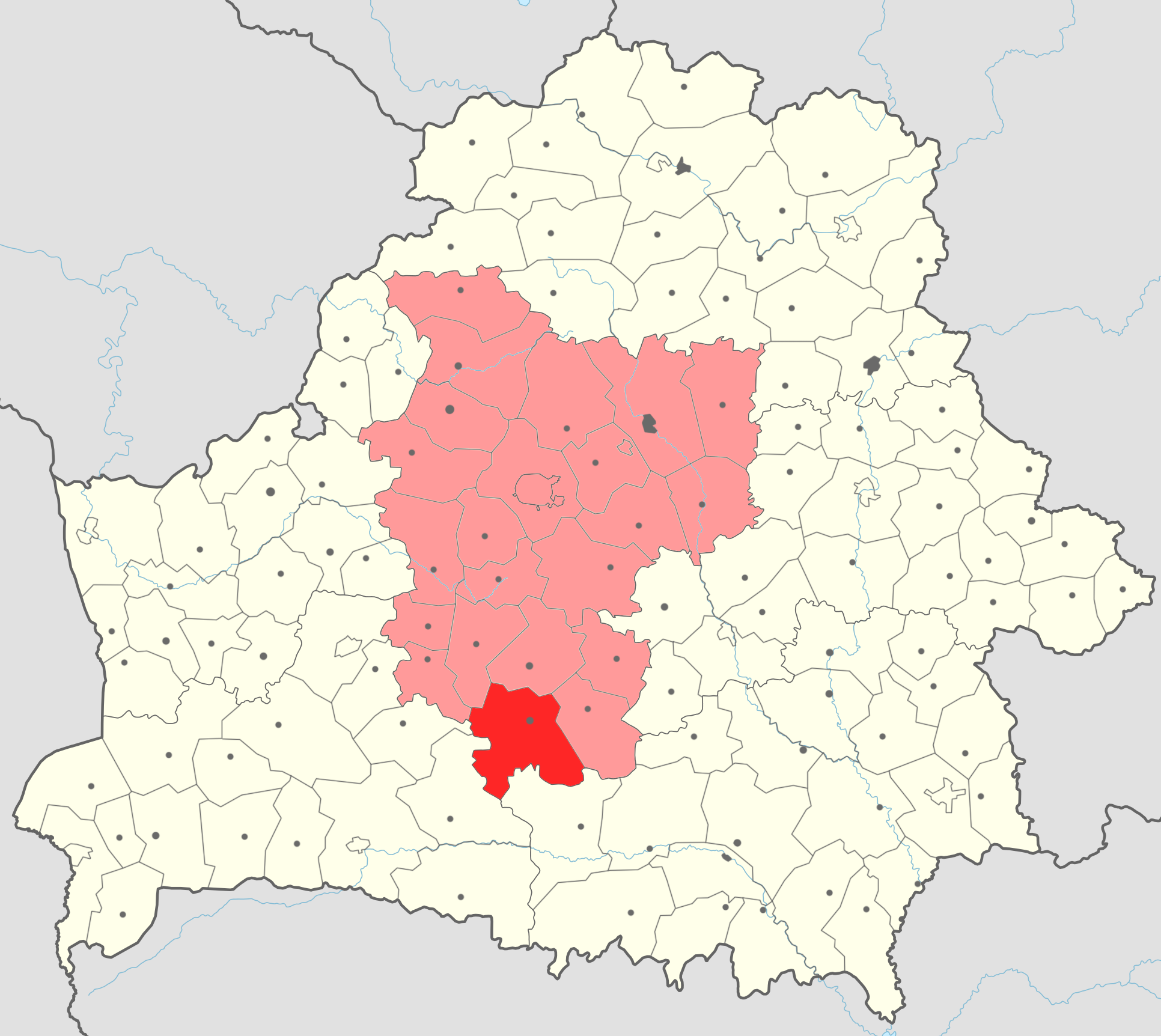
- Coordinates: 52.8167°N 27.5333°E
- Country: Belarus
- Region: Minsk region
- Administrative center: Salihorsk

Area
  - District: 2,498.91 km^{2} (964.83 sq mi)

Population (2024)
  - District: 126,495
  - Density: 50.6201/km^{2} (131.105/sq mi)
  - Urban: 108,279
  - Rural: 18,216
- Time zone: UTC+3 (MSK)
- Website: eng.soligorsk.gov.by

Salihorsk district (Belarusian: Салігорскі раён, romanized: Salihorski rajon; Russian: Солигорский район) is a district (raion) of Minsk region in Belarus. The administrative center of the district is Salihorsk. As of 2024, it has a population of 126,495.
