= Vyalyatsichy =

Vyalyatsichy (Belarusian: Вяляцічы) or Velyatichi (Russian: Велятичи) may refer to the following places in Belarus:

- Vyalyatsichy, Brest Region, a village in Pinsk District, Brest Region
- Vyalyatsichy, Minsk Region, an agrotown in Barysaw District, Minsk Region
