= Pahost, Byerazino district rural council =

Subdivision of Byerazino district, Belarus

Pahost rural council (Belarusian: Пагосцкі сельсавет; Russian: Погостский сельсовет) is a lower-level subdivision (selsoviet) of Byerazino district, Minsk region, Belarus. Its administrative center is Pahost, Byerazino district. (administratively not included into the subdivision).
