= Zembin rural council =

Zembin rural council (Belarusian: Зембінскі сельсавет; Russian: Зембинский сельсовет) is a lower-level subdivision (selsoviet) of Byerazino district, Minsk region, Belarus. Its administrative center is Zembin.
