= Vesyalova rural council =

Vesyalova rural council (Belarusian: Весялоўскі сельсавет; Russian: Веселовский сельсовет) is a lower-level subdivision (selsoviet) of Byerazino district, Minsk region, Belarus. Its administrative center is Vesyalova, Barysaw district.
