= Byerazino rural council =

Byerazino rural council (Belarusian: Бярэзінскі сельсавет) may refer to:

- Byerazino, Byerazino district rural council, Minsk region, Belarus
- Byerazino, Dokshytsy district rural council, Vitebsk region, Belarus
