= Pryharadny rural council =

Pryharadny rural council (Belarusian: Прыгарадны сельсавет; Russian: Пригородный сельсовет) is a lower-level subdivision (selsoviet) of Byerazino district, Minsk region, Belarus. Its administrative center is Starabarysaw.
