= Ikany rural council =

Ikany rural council (Belarusian: Іканскі сельсавет; Russian: Иканский сельсовет) is a lower-level subdivision (selsoviet) of Byerazino district, Minsk region, Belarus. Its administrative center is Ikany.
