= Hlivin rural council =

Subdivision in Belarus

Hlivin rural council (Belarusian: Глівінскі сельсавет; Russian: Гливинский сельсовет) is a lower-level subdivision (selsoviet) of Byerazino district, Minsk region, Belarus. Its administrative center is Hlivin.
