= Bahushevichy rural council =

Bahushevichy rural council (Belarusian: Багушэвіцкі сельсавет; Russian: Богушевичский сельсовет) is a lower-level subdivision (selsoviet) of Byerazino district, Minsk region, Belarus. Its administrative center is Bahushevichy, Byerazino district
