= Mstsizh rural council =

Mstsizh rural council (Belarusian: Мсціжскі сельсавет; Russian: Мстижский сельсовет) is a lower-level subdivision (selsoviet) of Barysaw district, Minsk region, Belarus. Its administrative center is Mstsizh.
