= Kaplantsy rural council =

Kaplantsy rural council (Belarusian: Капланецкі сельсавет; Russian: Капланецкий сельсовет) is a lower-level subdivision (selsoviet) of Byerazino district, Minsk region, Belarus. Its administrative center is Kaplantsy.
