= Myotcha rural council =

Myotcha rural council (Belarusian: Мётчанскі сельсавет; Russian: Метченский сельсовет) is a lower-level subdivision (selsoviet) of Byerazino district, Minsk region, Belarus. Its administrative center is Novaya Myotcha.
