= Pyerasady rural council =

Pyerasady rural council (Belarusian: Перасадскі сельсавет; Russian: Пересадский сельсовет) is a lower-level subdivision (selsoviet) of Byerazino district, Minsk region, Belarus. Its administrative center is Pyerasady.
