= Dzmitravichy, Byerazino district rural council =

Dzmitravichy rural council (Belarusian: Дзмітравіцкі сельсавет; Russian: Дмитровичский сельсовет) is a lower-level subdivision (selsoviet) of Byerazino district, Minsk region, Belarus. Its administrative center is Dzmitravichy (administratively not included into the subdivision).
