= Maisyeyewshchyna rural council =

Maisyeyewshchyna rural council (Belarusian: Маісееўшчынскі сельсавет; Russian: Моисеевщинский сельсовет) is a lower-level subdivision (selsoviet) of Byerazino district, Minsk region, Belarus. Its administrative center is Maisyeyewshchyna.
