= Vyalyatsichy, Barysaw district rural council =

Vyalyatsichy rural council (Belarusian: Вяляціцкі сельсавет; Russian: Велятичский сельсовет) is a lower-level subdivision (selsoviet) of Byerazino district, Minsk region, Belarus. Its administrative center is Vyalyatsichy.
