= Paplavy rural council =

Paplavy rural council (Belarusian: Паплаўскі сельсавет; Russian: Поплавский сельсовет) is a lower-level subdivision (selsoviet) of Byerazino district, Minsk region, Belarus.
