= Nemanitsa rural council =

Nemanitsa rural council (Belarusian: Неманіцкі сельсавет; Russian: Неманицкий сельсовет) is a lower-level subdivision (selsoviet) of Byerazino district, Minsk region, Belarus. Its administrative center is Nemanitsa.
