= Novaya Myotcha =

Village in Minsk Region, Belarus

Novaya Myotcha Новая Мётча
- Village
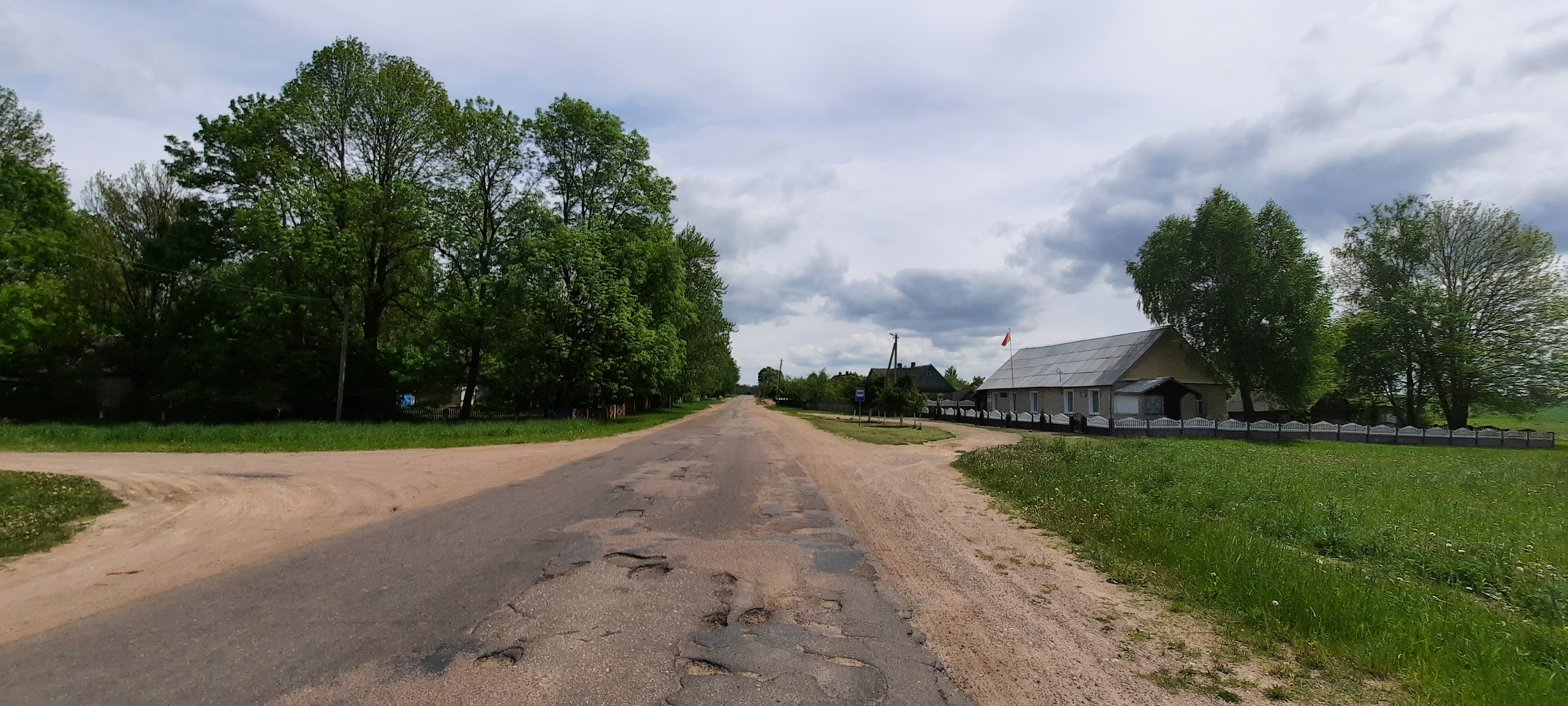

- Location within Belarus
- Coordinates: 54°11′17″N 28°44′21″E
- Country: Belarus
- Region: Minsk Region
- District: Barysaw District
- Time zone: UTC+3 (MSK)

Novaya Myotcha (Belarusian: Новая Мётча, romanized: Novaja Miotča; Russian: Новая Мётча) is a village in Barysaw District, Minsk Region, Belarus. It serves as the administrative center of Myotcha rural council. Novaya Myotcha is located 20 kilometres (12 mi) southeast from Barysaw and 96 kilometres (60 mi) from the capital Minsk. In 2000, it had a population of 86.
