= Maisyeyewshchyna =

Agrotown in Minsk Region, Belarus

Maisyeyewshchyna Маісееўшчына (Belarusian) Моисеевщина (Russian)
- Agrotown
- Location within Belarus
- Coordinates: 54°33′41″N 28°41′53″E
- Country: Belarus
- Region: Minsk Region
- District: Barysaw District
- Time zone: UTC+3 (MSK)

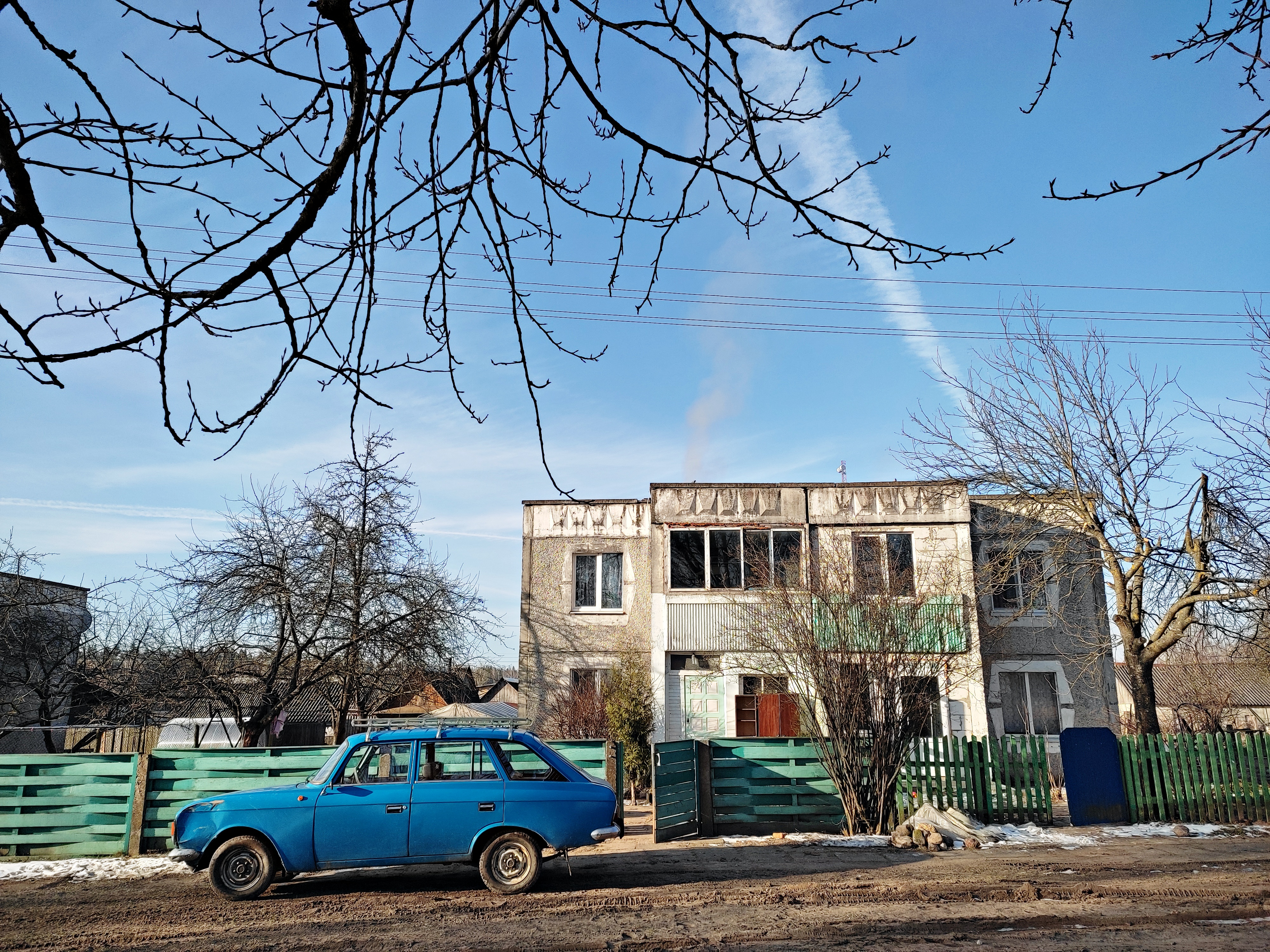
Maisyeyewshchyna

Maisyeyewshchyna (Belarusian: Маісееўшчына, romanized: Maisiejeŭščyna; Russian: Моисеевщина, romanized: Moiseyevshchina) is an agrotown in Barysaw District, Minsk Region, Belarus. It serves as the administrative center of Maisyeyewshchyna rural council.
