= Kishchyna Slabada =

Agrotown in Minsk Region, Belarus

Kishchyna Slabada Кішчына Слабада (Belarusian) Кищина Слобода (Russian)
- Agrotown
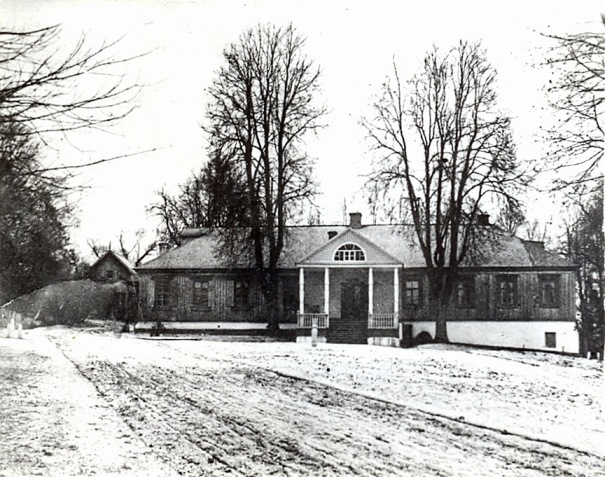
- Kiščyna Słabada, Ciundziavicki manor

- Location within Belarus
- Coordinates: 54°23′25″N 28°27′59″E
- Country: Belarus
- Region: Minsk Region
- District: Barysaw District
- Time zone: UTC+3 (MSK)

Kishchyna Slabada (Belarusian: Кішчына Слабада, romanized: Kiščyna Slabada; Russian: Кищина Слобода, romanized: Kishchina Sloboda) is an agrotown in Barysaw District, Minsk Region, Belarus. It is administratively part of Pryharadny selsoviet; until 2010, it served as the administrative center of the former Kishchyna Slabada selsoviet.
