= Starabarysaw =

Agrotown in Minsk Region, Belarus

Starabarysaw Старабарысаў (Belarusian) Староборисов (Russian)
- Agrotown
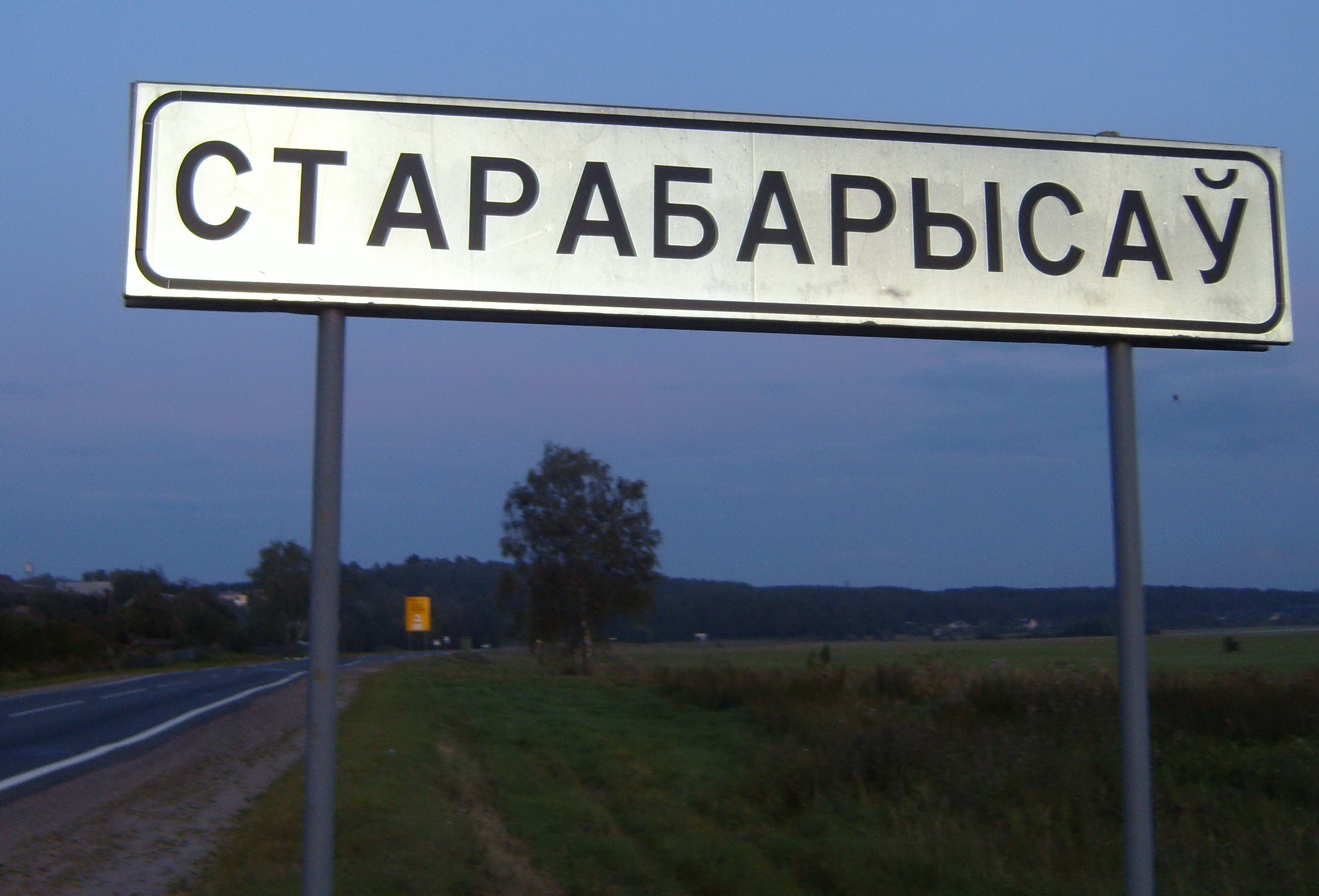

- Location within Belarus
- Coordinates: 54°16′50″N 28°28′49″E
- Country: Belarus
- Region: Minsk Region
- District: Barysaw District
- Time zone: UTC+3 (MSK)

Starabarysaw, or Staroborisov, (Note: Belarusian: Старабарысаў, romanized: Starabarysaŭ; Russian: Староборисов, Старо-Борисов, romanized: Staroborisov, Staro-Borisov.) is an agrotown in Barysaw District, Minsk Region, Belarus. It serves as the administrative center of Pryharadny rural council. It is located seven kilometres (4.3 mi) from Barysaw and 75 kilometres (47 mi) from Minsk.

== History ==
The settlement was first mentioned in 1102 when the prince Rogvolod Vseslavich ordered its construction.

== Bibliography ==
- Štychaŭ, H. V. (2002). Беларуская энцыклапедыя: У 18 т. Т.15: Следавікі — Трыо. Minsk: Беларуская энцыклапедыя. p. 153. ISBN 985-11-0035-8.
