= Pahost, Byerazino district =

Pahost Пагост (Belarusian)
- Agrotown
- Location within Belarus
- Coordinates: 53°50′49″N 29°8′51″E
- Country: Belarus
- Region: Minsk Region
- District: Byerazino District

Population (2009)
  - Total: 611
- Time zone: UTC+3 (MSK)
- Postal code: 223310
- Area code: +375 1715
- License plate: 5

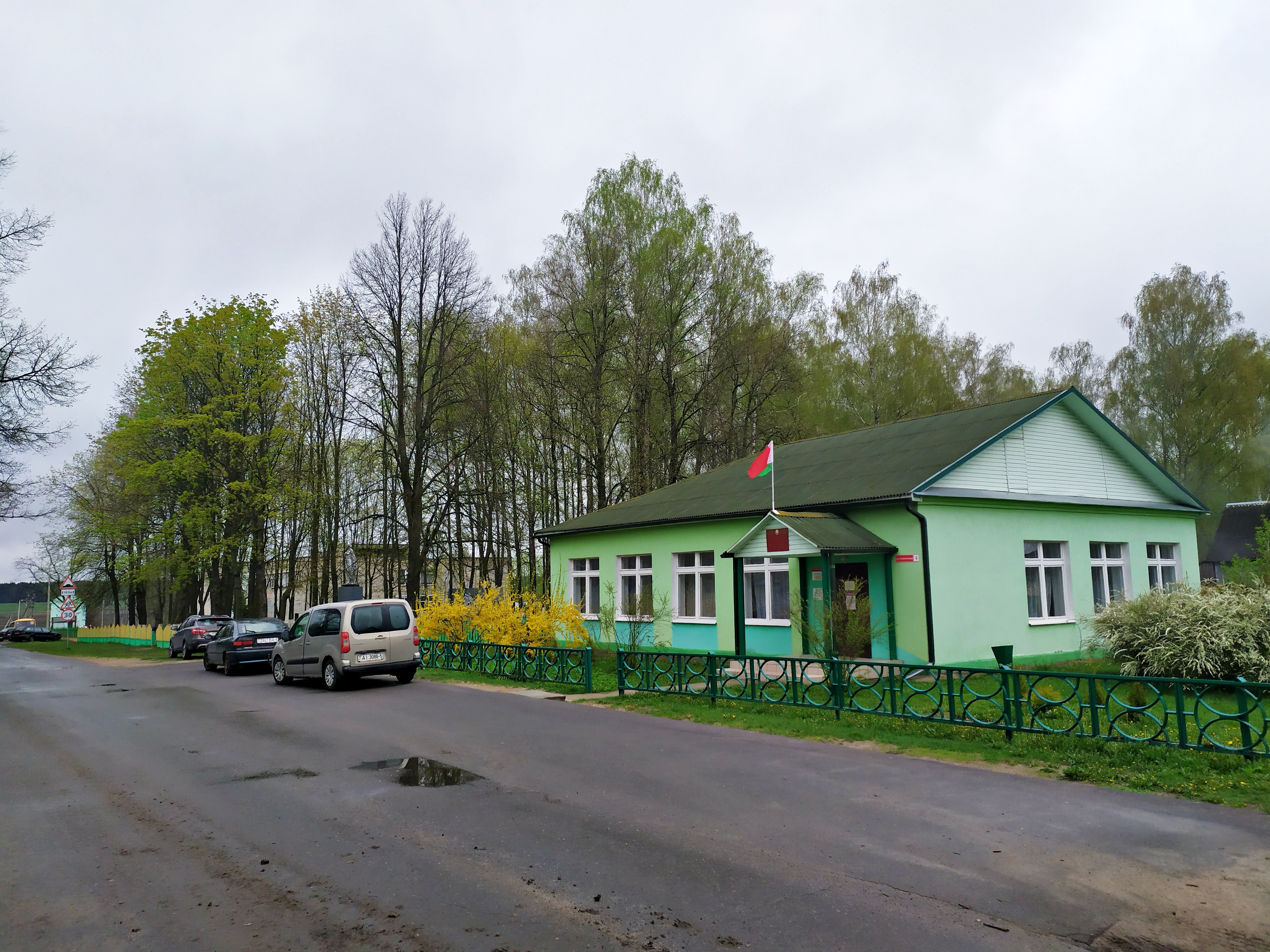

Pahost or Pogost (Belarusian: Пагост; Russian: Погост; Yiddish: פּאָהאָסט, romanized: Pohost) is an agrotown in Byerazino District, Minsk Region, Belarus. It serves as the administrative center of Pahost selsoviet. It had a population of 611 according to the 2009 census.

== History ==
Pahost was first shown on the maps of the Grand Duchy of Lithuania during the 16th century as part of Lubuszany Parish, Minsk Powiat of Minsk Voivodeship. In 1668, it was granted the status of miasteczko by John II Casimir Vasa. Between 16 and 17 June 1708, on his way to Lubuszany during the Great Northern War, Charles XII of Sweden passed through Pahost, devastating the region. In 1721 Pahost had nine dwellings and was in Orsha Powiat, owned by a landowner. Augustus III of Poland affirmed the miasteczko privileges of Pahost in 1746.

After the Second Partition of Poland in 1793, Pahost become part of the Russian Empire. From 12 December 1796, it was a town in the Igumensky Uyezd of Minsk Governorate. It was owned by Ludwik Tyszkiewicz in 1799 and a year later had 132 dwellings and 691 residents, with a Uniate church, parsonage, tavern, and mill. In 1810 or 1816, a new church was built using peasant resources. In 1845 the town was the property of Countess Wańkowicz and had 403 inhabitants. Its population grew to 444 in 1858, when it was owned by Count Potocki. A primary school was opened in 1863, and by 1892, it had 50 students. In 1866, Pahost had 775 inhabitants, a water mill, a church, a synagogue, and a prayer school. Pahost continued to grow and in the Russian Empire Census of 1897 was recorded as having a population of 1,435, a church, three prayer schools, a bakery, 14 shops, an inn and a tavern.

== Transport ==
Pahost is 10 kilometers (6.2 mi) east of Byerazino near the M4 highway and 39 kilometers (24 mi) from the Stajalava railway station of the Asipovichy–Mogilev line.

== Bibliography ==
- Byalov, T.U., ed. (2010). "Пагост". Гарады і вёскі Беларусі: энцыклапедыя (in Belarusian). Vol. 8. Мінская вобласць. Кн. 1. Minsk: BelEn. pp. 301–302.
