= Azdzyatsichy =

Agrotown in Minsk Region, Belarus

Azdzyatsichy Аздзяцічы (Belarusian) Оздятичи (Russian)
- Agrotown
- Location within Belarus
- Coordinates: 54°05′46″N 28°49′30″E
- Country: Belarus
- Region: Minsk Region
- District: Barysaw District
- Time zone: UTC+3 (MSK)

Azdzyatsichy (Belarusian: Аздзяцічы, romanized: Azdziacičy; Russian: Оздятичи, romanized: Ozdyatichi) is an agrotown in Barysaw District, Minsk Region, Belarus. It is part of Myotcha selsoviet; until 2013, it served as the administrative center of the former Azdzyatsichy selsoviet.
