= Pyerasady =

Agrotown in Minsk Region, Belarus

Pyerasady Перасады (Belarusian) Пересады (Russian)
- Agrotown
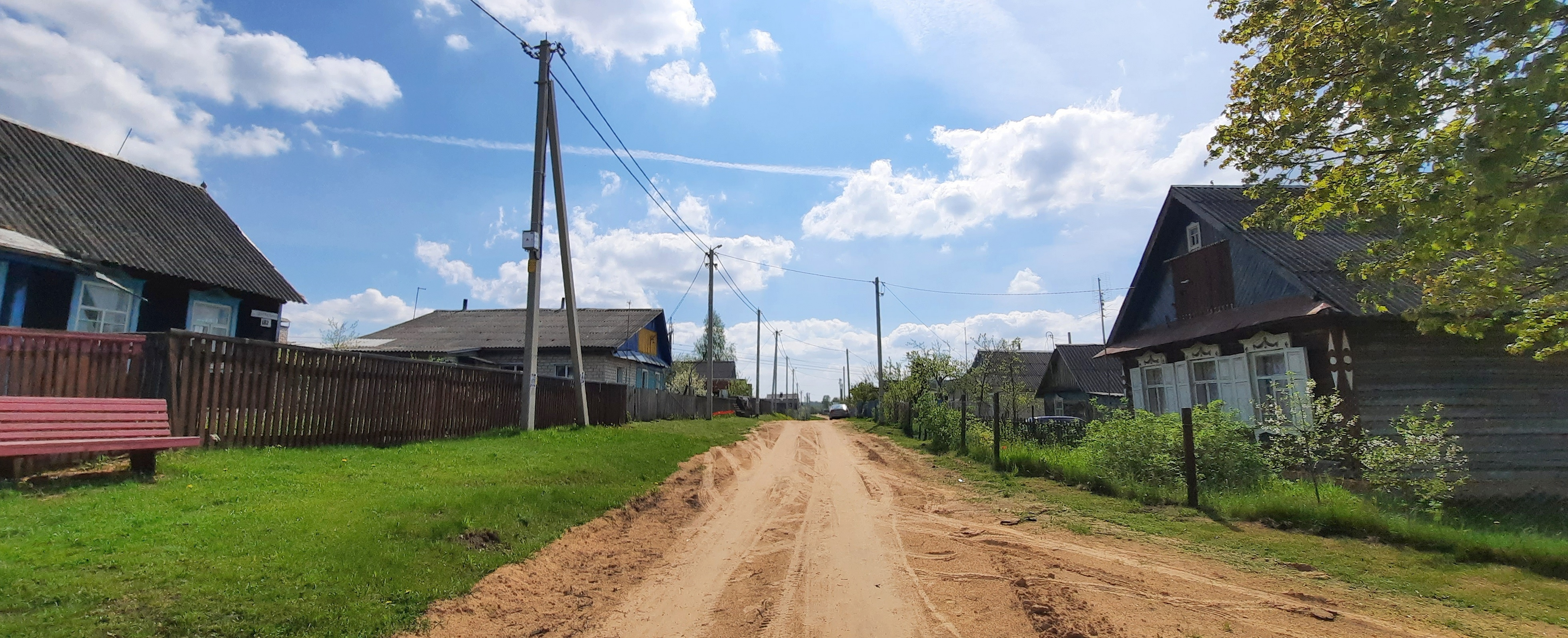

- Location within Belarus
- Coordinates: 54°07′55″N 28°25′00″E
- Country: Belarus
- Region: Minsk Region
- District: Barysaw District
- Time zone: UTC+3 (MSK)

Pyerasady (Belarusian: Перасады, romanized: Pierasady; Russian: Пересады, romanized: Peresady) is an agrotown in Barysaw District, Minsk Region, Belarus. It serves as the administrative center of Pyerasady rural council.
