= Byerazino, Byerazino district rural council =

Subdivision of Byerazino district, Belarus

Byerazino rural council (Belarusian: Бярэзінскі сельсавет; Russian: Березинский сельсовет) is a lower-level subdivision (selsoviet) of Byerazino district, Minsk region, Belarus. Its administrative center is the town of Byerazino (administratively not included into the subdivision).
