= Vyalyatsichy, Minsk region =

Agrotown in Minsk Region, Belarus

Vyalyatsichy Вяляцічы (Belarusian) Велятичи (Russian)
- Agrotown
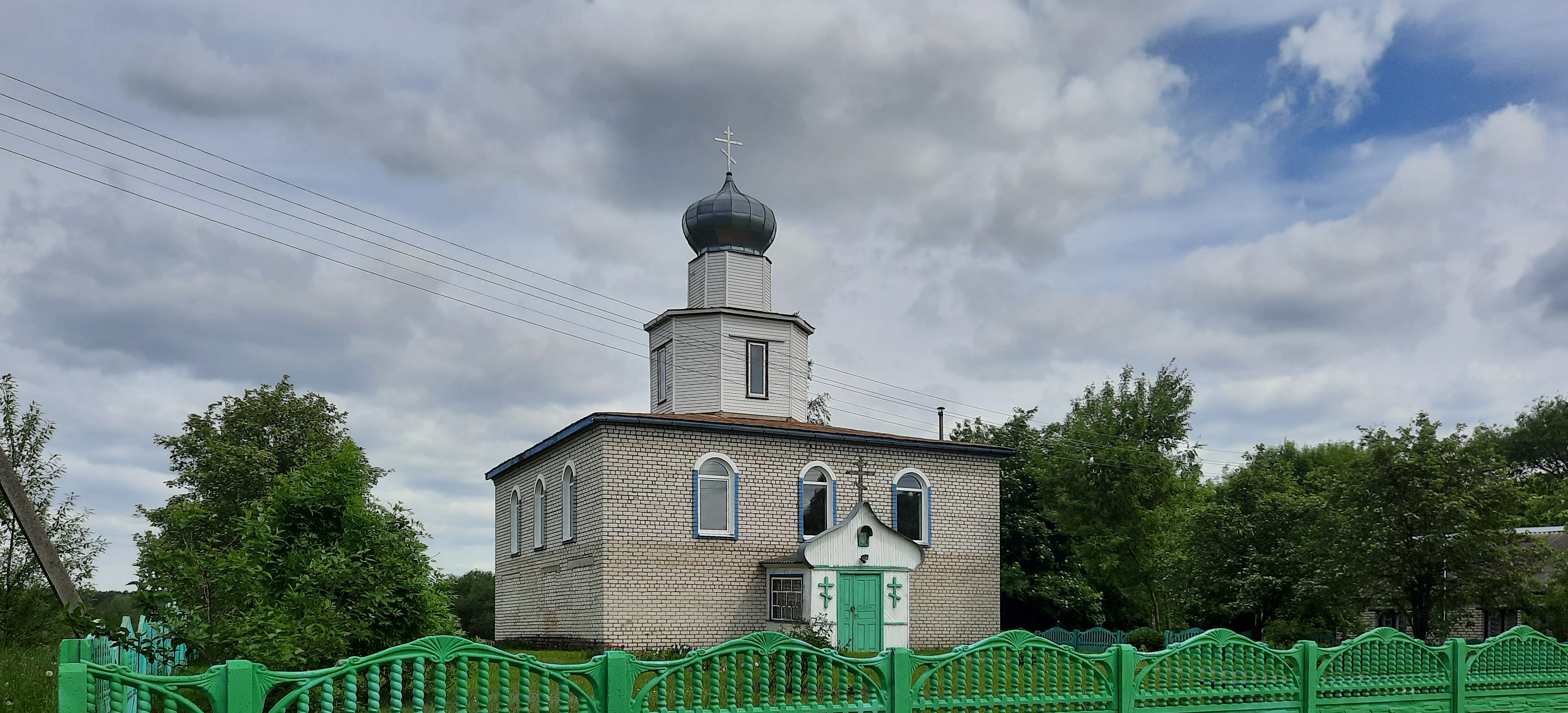

- Location within Belarus
- Coordinates: 54°09′N 28°55′E
- Country: Belarus
- Region: Minsk Region
- District: Barysaw District
- Time zone: UTC+3 (MSK)

Vyalyatsichy (Belarusian: Вяляцічы, romanized: Vialiacičy; Russian: Велятичи, romanized: Velyatichi) is an agrotown in Barysaw District, Minsk Region, Belarus. It serves as the administrative center of Vyalyatsichy rural council.
