= Zembin =

Agrotown in Minsk Region, Belarus

Zembin Зембін (Belarusian)
- Agrotown
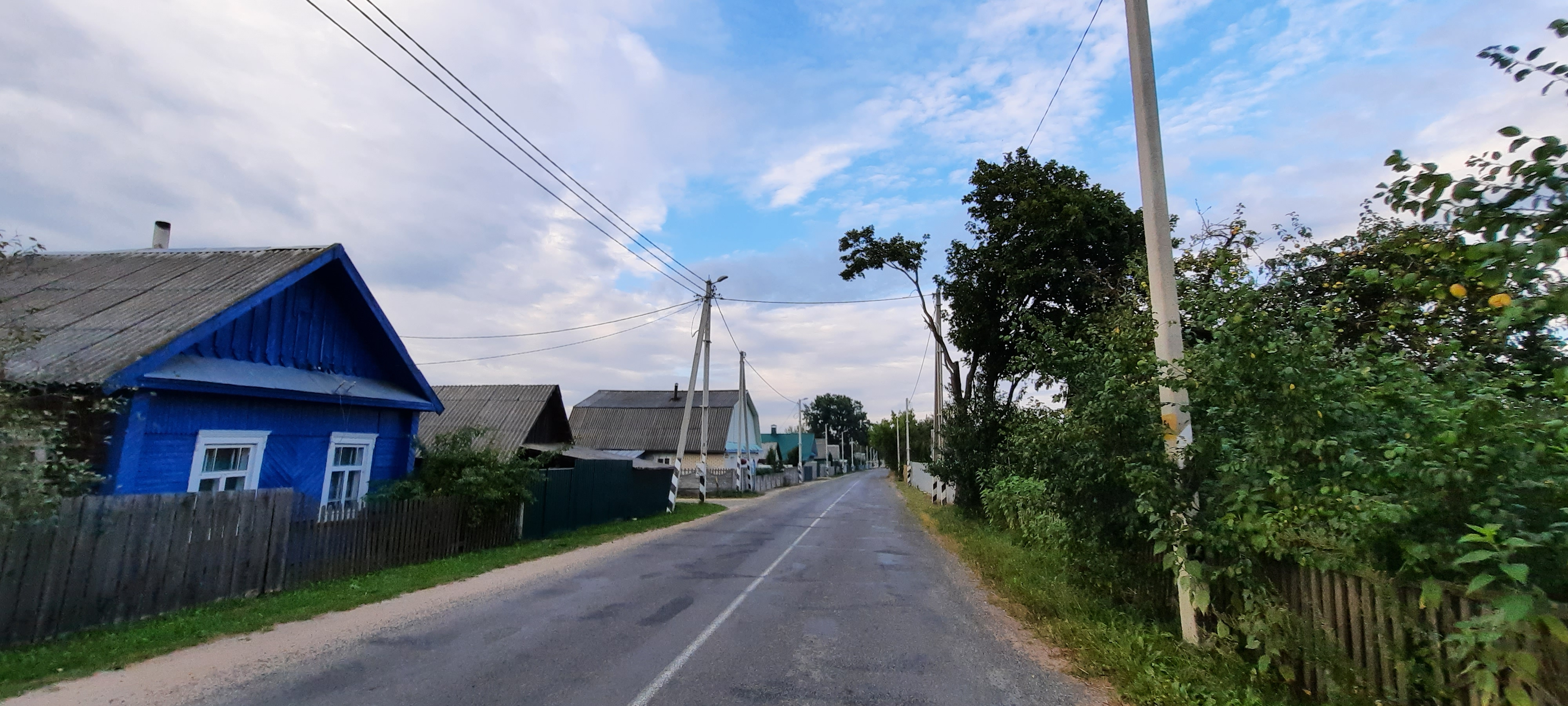

- Location within Belarus
- Coordinates: 54°22′N 28°13′E
- Country: Belarus
- Region: Minsk Region
- District: Barysaw District

Population (2014)
  - Total: 713
- Time zone: UTC+3 (MSK)
- Postal code: 222133
- Area code: +375 177
- License plate: 5

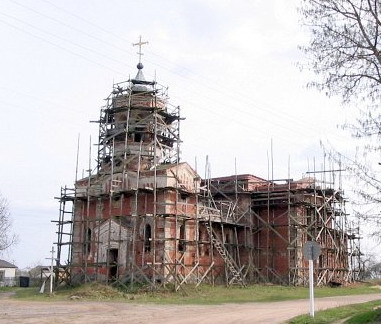
The Church of St Michael the Archangel (1908)

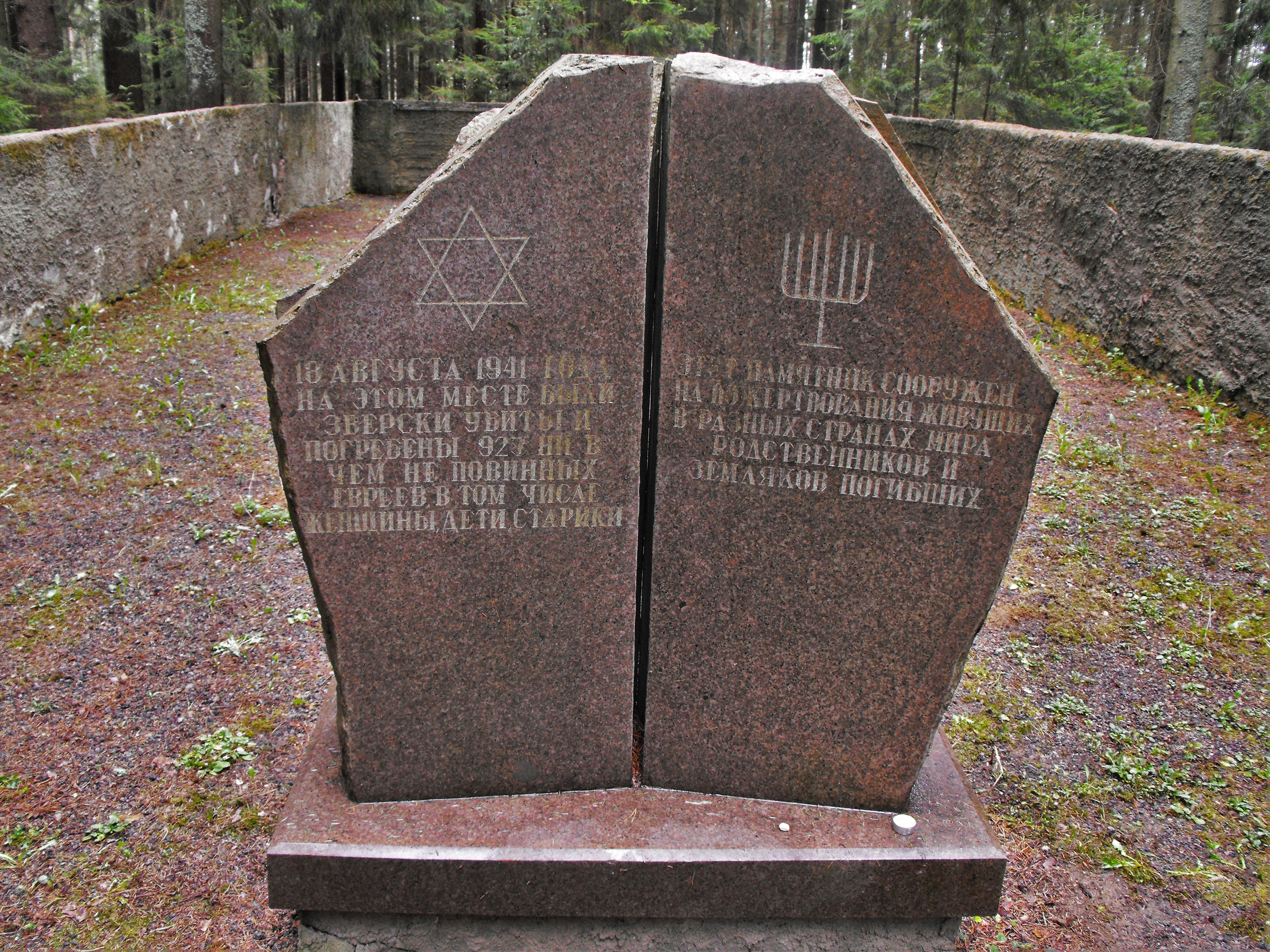
The monument at the site of shooting the prisoners of Zembin ghetto

Zembin (Belarusian: Зембін; Russian: Зембин; Polish: Ziembin) is an agrotown in Barysaw District, Minsk Region, Belarus. It serves as the administrative center of Zembin selsoviet.

== History ==
=== Origins and Polish-Lithuanian period ===
According to the research of the 19th century, Zembin is the oldest settlement among the adjacent villages, though the exact date of its foundation is unknown. The first record is dated only 1526. At that time there was a large estate owned by the Radziwills. Over the centuries, Zembin belonged to a number of eminent szlachta dynasties.

The prosperity of Zembin was in the 16th century. At that time it had a township status. From the middle of the 17th century, because of the war and its consequences, Zembin endured decay. Battles during the Great Northern War did not touch the township, though a long dislocation of a Moscow host headed by A. Menshikov here resulted in utter ruin. For that reason Zembin lost the status of a township. As of 1777 there were 38 homesteads, an inn, a brew-house and 2 watermills.

The year 1783 marked a watershed in the history of Zembin. The then its owner Khreptovich returned the settlement the status of a township and invited to settle all free people and provided favourable conditions for trading. The Jews henceforth settled in Zembin, and its began to develop quickly.

=== Under the Russian Empire ===
As a result of the Second Partition of the Polish-Lithuanian Commonwealth (1793) Zembin became a part of the Russian Empire in Borisovsky Uyezd. The new authorities dispossessed Iokhim Khreptovich of his township but in 1807 returned it to his son Irinei. In 1795, a post office was opened in Zembin. There were 4 postmen and 8 horses.

During the war of 1812, Napoleon spent here the first night after the tragic crossing the river Berezina. A badly wounded French general made his confession in church. He died and was buried in Zembin. The war between the Russian Empire and France, later the uprisings of the 19th century prevented the township from developing. Before 1800, there were 52 homesteads, in 1864, there were only 50. In later years, Zembin grew quickly. In 1880, there were already 635 inhabitants and 139 homesteads (101 of them belonged to the Jews). The township became the administrative centre of a volost. As of 1890, it consisted of 124 populated localities with total population 9,209.

As of 1908 in Zembin, there were 1189 inhabitants. It a quarter greater than of today total population. There was a watermill, 4 smithies, a school, 23 shops, a hospital 3 taverns and 5 inns. During the First World War, between February and December 1918, the township was occupied by German troops.

=== Soviet period and present time ===
In 1919, Zembin was included into the BSSR, in 1927 lost the district center status, which it had received three years earlier. As of 1926 Zembin was inhabited by 1,199 people, 838 of them were the Jews. There was a sewing workshop, a shoe-repair shop, 2 joinery shops, 3 tanneries, 5 smithies, a stream-meals, 2 bakeries, 2 oil-mills. 27 September 1933 the status of the place was reduced to a village.

During the Second World War from July 1941 till 30 June 1944, Zembin was under German occupation. In July 1941 Nazis set up Zembin ghetto, situated next to Jewish cemetery in The Workers' and Peasants' Street (now Izzy Kharik). 18 August 1941 as a result of mass executions of 927 Jews Zembin ghetto was liquidated. In 1967, the relatives of the dead enclosed the place of execution with a concrete fence and set up a commemorative plaque. In 2001 a monument was erected here.
