= Barysaw district =

District of Minsk region, Belarus

Barysaw district Барысаўскі раён (Belarusian) Борисовский район (Russian)
- District
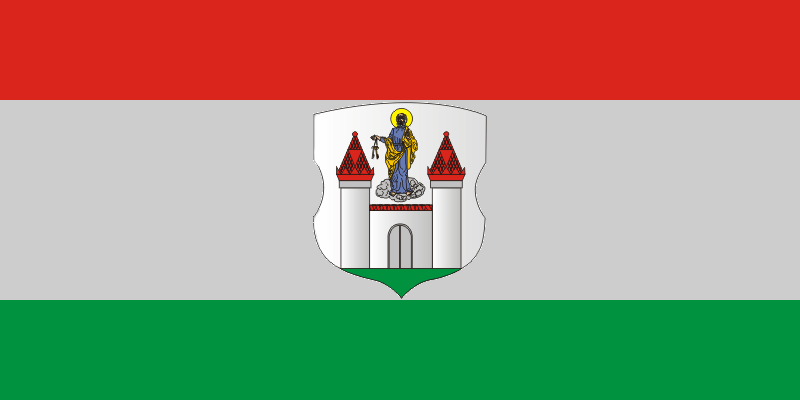
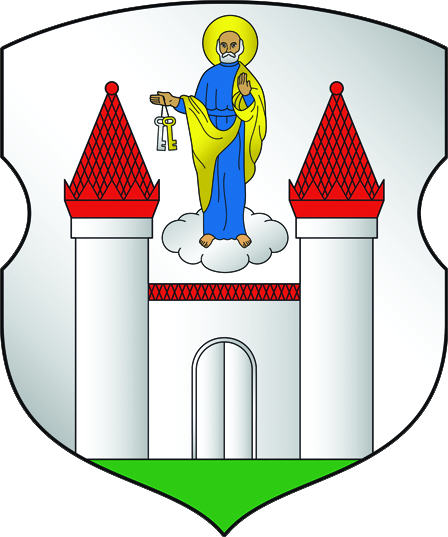
- Flag Coat of arms

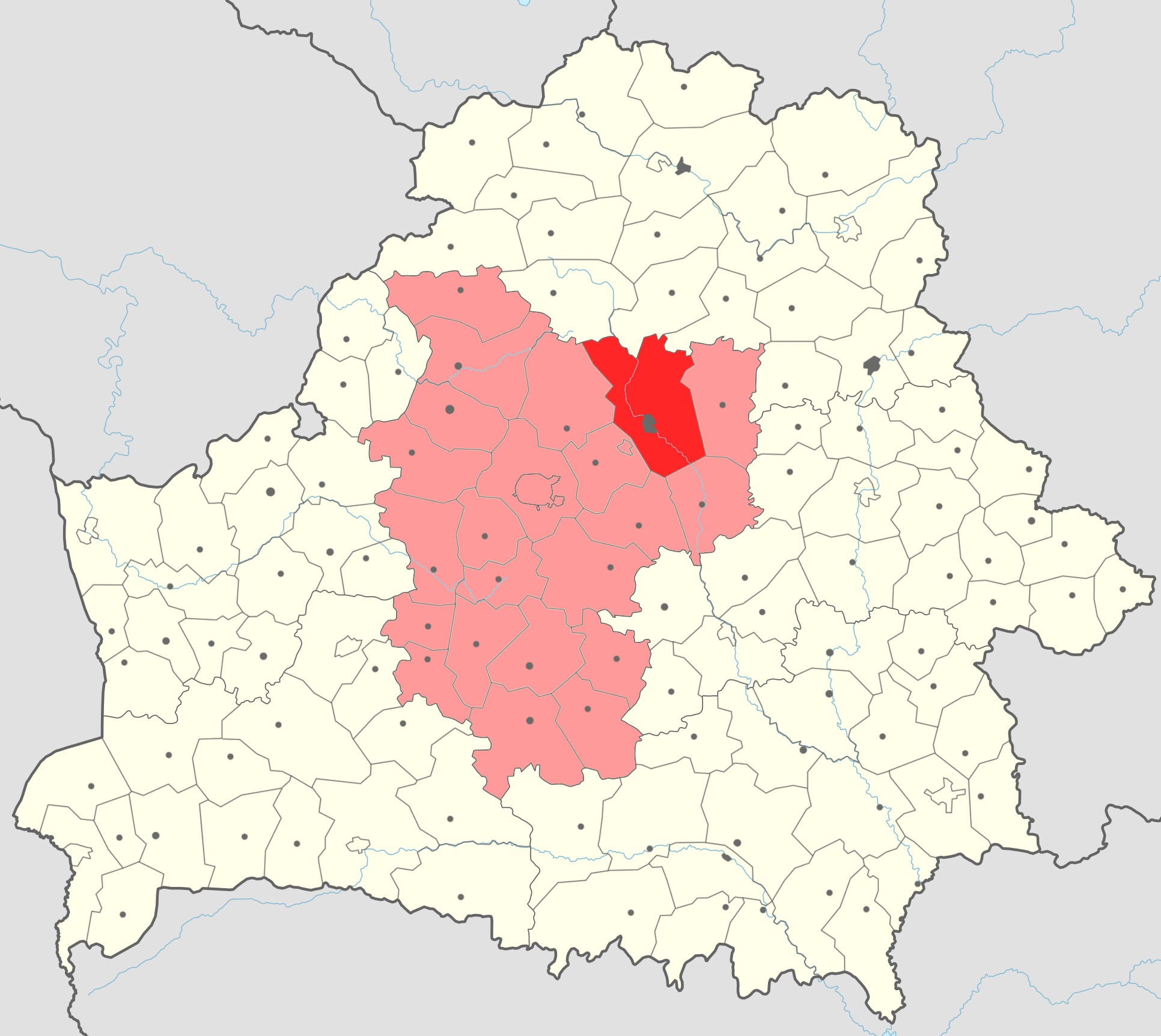
- Coordinates: 54.2333°N 28.5000°E
- Country: Belarus
- Region: Minsk region
- Administrative center: Barysaw

Area
  - District: 2,987.63 km^{2} (1,153.53 sq mi)

Population (2024)
  - District: 168,672
  - Density: 56.4568/km^{2} (146.222/sq mi)
  - Urban: 135,696
  - Rural: 32,976
- Time zone: UTC+3 (MSK)
- Website: Official website

Barysaw district or Barysaŭ district (Belarusian: Барысаўскі раён; Russian: Борисовский район) is a district (raion) of Minsk region in Belarus. Its administrative center is the city of Barysaw. As of 2024, it has a population of 168,672.

== Settlements ==
- Azdzyatsichy
- Barysaw
- Kishchyna Slabada
- Loshnitsa
- Maisyeyewshchyna
- Novaya Myotcha
- Pyerasady
- Starabarysaw
- Vyalyatsichy
- Zembin

== Notable residents ==
- Ivan Yermachenka (1894–1970), Belarusian politician, diplomat and writer
