= Ivan Yermachenka =

Belarusian Axis collaborator politician

Col. Ivan Yermachenka
- Іван Ермачэнка
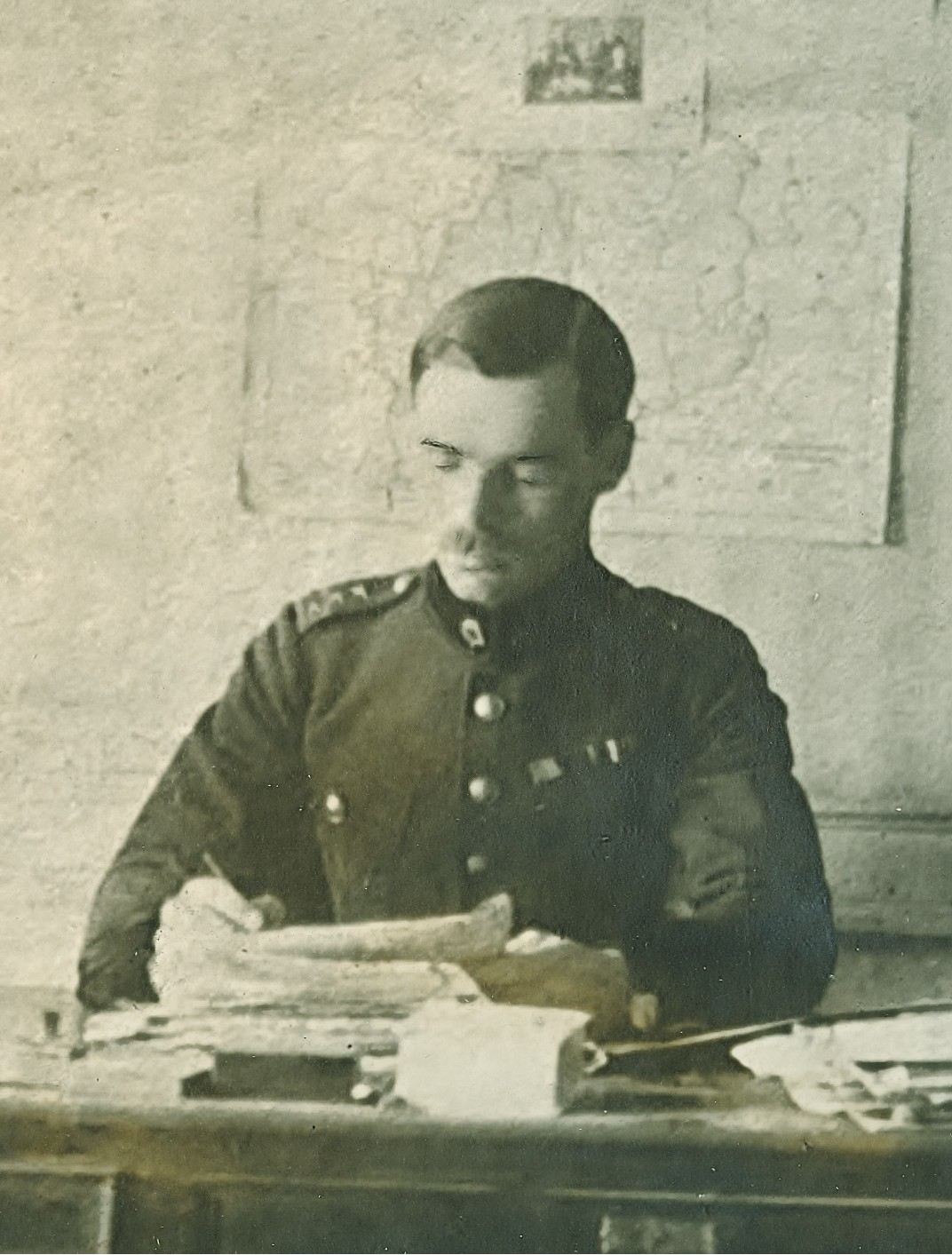
- Born: May 13, 1894; Barysau, Russian Empire (now Belarus)
- Died: February 25, 1970 (aged 75); Binghamton, New York
- Military career
- Allegiance: Russian Empire (Russia) White Army (Belarus) Belarusian Democratic Republic
- Service years: 1914–1922
- Rank: Colonel

Ivan Abramavich Yermachenka (Belarusian: Іван Абрамавіч Ермачэнка; Russian: Иван Абрамович Ермаченко; May 13, 1894 - February 25, 1970), name sometimes translated to John Ermachenko, was a Russian military officer as well as a Belarusian politician, diplomat and writer.

== Early life ==
Ivan Yermachenka was born into a peasant family near Barysaw. Soon the family moved to Moscow, where the head of the family worked on the railway. He graduated from the gymnasium in Moscow, entered the electrical engineering faculty, but his studies were interrupted by the First World War.

== World War I and the Russian Civil War ==
During World War I, he was in an ensign school, served in the Imperial Russian army and was sent to the front, where he rose to the rank of lieutenant. He was awarded several times. In 1918, he was captured and escaped. During the Russian Civil War, Yermachenka was an officer in the White Army, adjutant of General Pyotr Wrangel, and reached the rank of lieutenant colonel.

== Interwar ==
In 1920, he was evacuated to Istanbul, where he joined the Belarusian nationalist movement. In 1921 Yermachenka was appointed ambassador of the Belarusian Democratic Republic in Istanbul and general consul for the Balkans. He established Belarusian consulate missions in Bulgaria and in Yugoslavia.

In 1922 he was appointed deputy foreign minister of the democratic Belarusian government in exile in Kaunas. He then moved to Prague where in 1929 he graduated from the Medical Faculty of Charles University.

From 1938 Ivan Yermachenka worked on cooperation between the Belarusian exiled government and Nazi Germany. On 20 April 1939 Yermachenka sent together with Vasil Zacharka, the president of the Belarusian Democratic Republic in exile, a seventeen-page memorandum to Adolf Hitler personally asking him to take into account the interests of Belarus in any future developments.

== World War II ==
In October 1941 Yermachenka travelled to German-occupied Minsk to set up Belarusian Self-Help, the only legal Belarusian organization at that time. He later became advisor to Wilhelm Kube, the German Generalkommissar of Belarus. In June 1942, Yermachenka tried creating the Belarusian Self Defence Corps that was supposed to consist of three divisions, although only 20 battalions were created, which were not armed by the Germans, and thus they were disbanded in spring of 1943.

In the spring of 1943 Yermachenka was dismissed from all his posts as a result of an operation of the SS and the German police against Kube. On April 27, 1943, he was expelled to Prague where the Gestapo arrested him in relation to the September 1943 assassination of Kube. In early 1945 Yermachenka went to Germany.

== Cold War ==
In 1948 Yermachenka emigrated to the US, where he worked as doctor at the Binghamton State Hospital. He co-founded the United Belarusian-American Help Committee in South River, New Jersey and became an active member of the Belarusian community in the United States.

He died in Binghamton, New York in 1970.

== Sources ==
- Rein, Leonid (2011). The Kings and the Pawns: Collaboration in Byelorussia during World War II. New York: Berghahn Books. ISBN 978-0857450432.
- Munoz, Antonio J.; Romanko, Oleg V. (2003). Hitler's White Russians: Collaboration, Extermination and Anti-partisan Warfare in Byelorussia, 1941–1944. Bayside NY: Europa Books. ISBN 1-891227-42-4.
- Tucker-Jones, Anthony (19 July 2009). Stalin's Revenge: Operation Bagration & the Annihilation of Army Group Centre. Pen & Sword Books. ISBN 9781844685448.
