= Byerazino district =

District of Minsk Region, Belarus

Byerazino district Бярэзінскі раён (Belarusian) Березинский район (Russian)
- District
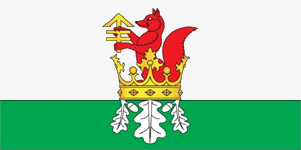
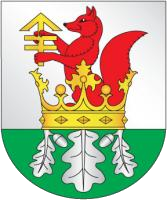
- Flag Coat of arms

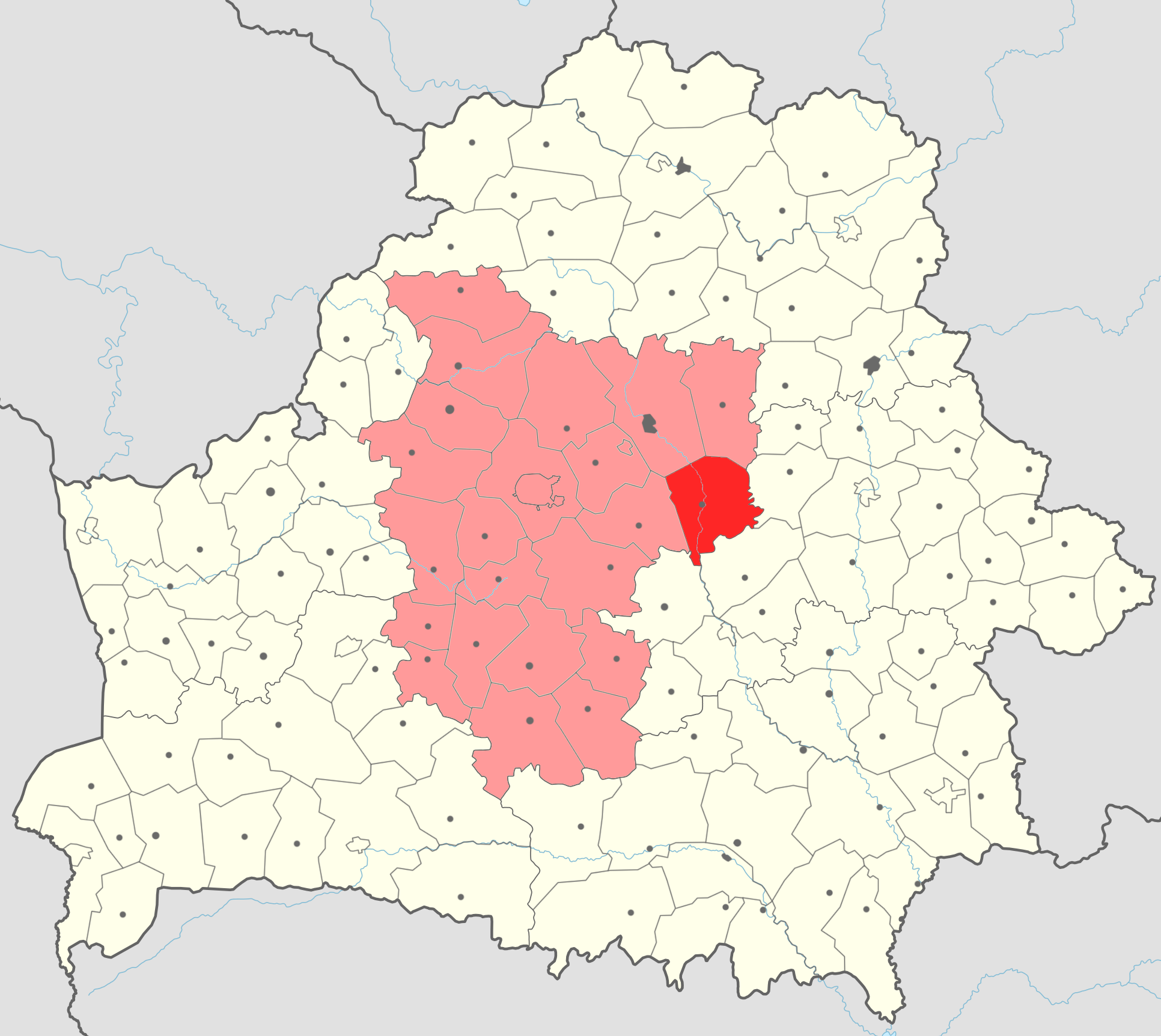
- Coordinates: 53°50′N 28°59′E
- Country: Belarus
- Region: Minsk region
- Administrative center: Byerazino

Area
  - District: 1,941 km^{2} (749 sq mi)

Population (2024)
  - District: 21,570
  - Density: 11.11/km^{2} (28.78/sq mi)
  - Urban: 11,366
  - Rural: 10,204
- Time zone: UTC+3 (MSK)
- Website: Berezino ispolkom website

Byerazino district or Bierazino district (Belarusian: Бярэзінскі раён; Russian: Березинский район) is a district (raion) of Minsk Region in Belarus. Its administrative center is Byerazino. As of 2024, it has a population of 21,570.

== Notable residents ==
- Mikola Ravienski (1886–1953), Belarusian composer, conductor and music critic, author of the music for the hymn Mahutny Boža (Almighty God)
- Walenty Wańkowicz (1799. Kałużyce estate (now village) – 1842), painter
