= Mikhailo Olelkovich =

Lithuanian prince (died 1481)

Prince of Kopyl
- Reign: 1443–1481
- Predecessor: Olelko Vladimirovich
- Successor: Simeon II

Prince of Slutsk
- Reign: 1454–1481
- Predecessor: Simeon Olelkovich
- Successor: Simeon II

Prince of Novgorod
- Reign: 1470–1471
- Died: August 30, 1481; Vilnius
- Issue: Simeon Mikhailovich Slutsky
- Family: Olelkovich branch of Gediminids
- Father: Aleksandras Olelka
- Mother: Anastasia Vasilievna
- Religion: Eastern Orthodox

Mikhailo or Mikhail Olelkovich (Russian: Михаил Олелькович; died August 30, 1481) was a noble from the Olelkovich family of the Grand Duchy of Lithuania who served as the appanage prince of Kopyl and Slutsk. He was the younger brother of Simeon Olelkovich, the prince of Kiev, and a cousin of Ivan III, the grand prince of Moscow. Mikhailo was allegedly involved both in bringing the Judaizers to Novgorod and the failed defection of the city's nobles to the Grand Duchy of Lithuania in 1471. He also organized a coup against Casimir IV Jagiellon, the king of Poland and grand duke of Lithuania, but was discovered and executed in 1481. Mikhailo's son Simeon continued the family line.

== Life ==
=== Early life ===
Following the death of his father Alexander in 1454, Mikhailo's older brother Simeon became the prince of Kiev and Mikhailo became the prince of Slutsk.

=== Novgorod affair ===
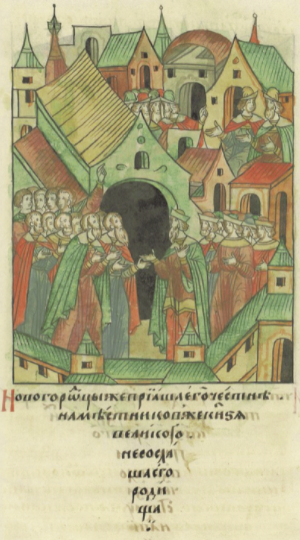
Novgorodians accepting Mikhailo as their prince, miniature from the Illustrated Chronicle of Ivan the Terrible (16th century)

According to the 1456 Treaty of Yazhelbitsy, the Novgorod Republic became dependent on the Grand Principality of Moscow and was not allowed to conduct an independent foreign policy. In a bid to regain independence, Novgorod began negotiations for an anti-Muscovite alliance with Casimir IV Jagiellon, the grand duke of Lithuania. It was alleged in an account purportedly drawn up in the archiepiscopal scriptorium in the mid-1470s that Mikhailo, as regent for Casimir IV, arrived in Novgorod initially to marry Marfa Boretskaya, the matriarch of the pro-Lithuanian faction in the city (or else to have her married to an unnamed Lithuanian nobleman).

Moscow accused Novgorod not only of violating the treaty, but also of religious treachery; there were also allegations that the marriage would have brought Novgorod over to Catholicism, but Gail Lenhoff and Janet Martin argue that the pro-Lithuanian, pro-Catholic allegations are highly suspect and, indeed, very unlikely. Mikhailo was an Orthodox Christian (as was Marfa Boretskaya), and he and his brother had strong differences of opinion with Casimir IV Jagiellon.

Mikhailo entered Novgorod on November 8, 1470 with a large retinue, and remained in the city until March 15, 1471. His large retinue included a certain Skhariya, who gained a following in Novgorod. The heresy spread from there to Moscow in 1479, when the grand prince Ivan III transferred several heretical priests to Moscow. The affair ended when Mikhailo withdrew from the city and Ivan III defeated the Novgorodians at the Battle of Shelon in July 1471. Robert O. Crummey says that Mikhailo was of "impeccably Russian and Orthodox background", but quickly became disillusioned with the new office and plundered the southern territories of the republic as he left.

The treaty of 11 August 1471 repeated the provisions of the 1456 accord, including that Novgorod could not have dealings with the grand prince's enemies and that the archbishops of Novgorod could be consecrated only in Moscow with the approval of the Russian metropolitan. In 1478, Moscow took direct control of the city and dismantled Novgorod's system of government.

=== Coup of 1481 ===
After the death of his brother Simeon in 1470, the Principality of Kiev was converted into the Kiev Voivodeship, and was governed by appointed officials (voivodes). This was a serious setback to the Olelkovich family as it claimed the principality as their possession since Mikhailo's grandfather Vladimir, son of Algirdas. The loss of Kiev could be attributed to Olelkovich's faith (Eastern Orthodoxy rather than Catholicism) and their close kinship with the grand princes of Moscow, who threatened Lithuania's eastern borders. For example, in 1479, Mikhailo acted as intermediary in arranging the marriage of Ivan the Young, son of Ivan III, and Elena, daughter of Stephen III of Moldavia. Disappointed by the Lithuanian politics, Mikhailo Olelkovich organized opposition to Casimir IV. In 1481, he, together with his relatives Iwan Olshanski-Dubrovicki and Feodor Ivanovich Belsky, organized a coup against the grand duke. However, the plot was discovered, possibly by the Kievan voivode Ivan Chodkiewicz, and Mikhailo and Iwan were executed on 30 August in Vilnius. Feodor managed to escape to the Moscow grand principality.

Mikhailo and 12 other Ruthenian nobles signed a letter to Pope Sixtus IV in 1476, authored by Misail Pstruch, the metropolitan of Kiev. The letters expressed loyalty to the Council of Florence and supported a church union between Catholicism and Eastern Orthodoxy. It also contained complains that the Catholics were discriminating the Orthodox Christians, and asked the Pope for protection. There are doubts whether the letter was authentic and not a later forgery.

== Ancestry ==
Ancestors of Mikhailo Olelkovich

16. Gediminas, Grand Duke of Lithuania
8. Algirdas, Grand Duke of Lithuania
17. Jewna of Polatsk
4. Vladimir Olgerdovich, Grand Prince of Kiev
18. Yaroslav, Prince of Vitebsk
9. Maria of Vitebsk
2. Alexander Olelka, Grand Prince of Kiev
1. Prince Mikhailo Aleksandrovich Olelkovich
24. Ivan II of Moscow, Grand Prince of Moscow
12. Dmitry Donskoy, Grand Prince of Moscow
25. Alexandra Velyaminova
6. Vasily I of Moscow, Grand Prince of Moscow
26. Dmitry Konstantinovich, Grand Prince of Nizhny Novgorod
13. Eudoxia of Moscow
27. Vasilisa of Rostov
3. Princess Anastasia Vasilievna
28. Kęstutis, Duke of Trakai
14. Vytautas, Grand Duke of Lithuania and Duke of Trakai
29. Birutė
7. Sophia of Lithuania
15. Anna, Grand Duchess of Lithuania
