= Anastasia Slutskaya =

- Born: circa 1470; Mstsislaw, Grand Duchy of Lithuania
- Died: circa 1523; Slutsk, Grand Duchy of Lithuania
- Spouse: Simeon II Olelkovich
- Issue: Yuri I Olelkovich, Tatiana, Alexandra
- House: Gediminids (by birth), Olelkovich (by marriage)
- Father: Ivan Yurievich Mstislavskiy
- Mother: Ulyana
- Religion: Eastern Orthodox

Anastasia Slutskaya (née Ivanovna; late 15th century – c. 1526) was a noblewoman. She was the regent of the Principality of Slutsk (then part of the Grand Duchy of Lithuania) during the minority of Yury (Prince of Slutsk) in 1503–1512.

== Biography ==
She was the daughter of Ivan Yurievich, Prince of Mstislavl, from his first marriage with Ulyana (Russian: Ульяна). Through her father, Anastasia was a descendant of Algirdas, Grand Duke of Lithuania and were closely associated with the Jagellonian dynasty. Anastasia had an older sister, Ulyana; who was married to Mikhail Ivanovich Zaslavsky, who inherited Mstislav due to their father lacking male heirs.

In the early 1490s, Anastasia married Semion Mikhailovich Slutsky, Prince of Slutsk and Kopyl, who died in 1503. Since their son, Yuri, was still too young, Anastasia became the ruler of the principality. She also had a daughter Alexandra who was married to Konstanty Ostrogski

At the time, the Tatars often attacked the principality. Prince Semion had to repel multiple attacks. After his death, Princess Anastasia led the troops to fight the invaders. She managed to protect the Principality of Slutsk from 1505 to 1508, although the land was devastated after the raids.

The young widow had many suitors. The most famous of Anastasia's admirers was Prince Mikhail Glinksi, a prominent Lithuanian lord. According to Maciej Stryjkowski, a late 16th-century Polish historian, Anastasia and Mikhail had an affair. However, when Mikhail proposed in 1508, she turned the offer down. To win her over, the suitor made two attempts to take Slutsk by force, both unsuccessful. Later, Glinsky and his brothers went to serve Grand Duke of Moscow Vasily III. In his message to Vasily III, Mikhail Glinski confessed that it was his relative Andrew Drozhdzh who had besieged Slutsk, not him.

When Anastasia's son Yuri grew older, he became the ruler of the principality while his mother stepped down.

Nothing is known about the last years of Anastasia's life. She died at the age of 55 (circa 1526), and her death is recorded in the Suprasl Necrology.

== Personal life ==
Husband:

- Simeon II Olelkovich (died on November 14, 1503), Prince of Slutsk and Kopyl since 1481

Children:

- Yuri (1492–1542), Prince of Slutsk since 1503. Married Helena Radziwiłł, daughter of the magnate Mikolaj II Radziwill, and had issue.
- Tatiana
- Alexandra, married to Konstantin Ivanovich Ostrogski (1460 or 1463 – September 11, 1530)

== Representation in art ==
Some East Slavic epics are directly or indirectly dedicated to Slutskaya as a brave female warrior.

In 2003, Belarusfilm production company produced a movie Anastasia Slutskaya. Her role was played by Svetlana Zelenkovskaya.

In September 2016, a monument to Slutskaya was erected in Slutsk, Belarus.

On October 30, 2018, the ballet "Anastasia" premiered at the National Academic Grand Opera and Ballet Theatre of Belarus to music by the contemporary Belarusian composer Vyacheslav Kuznetsov. The ballet was directed by Yuri Troyan, People's Artist of Belarus.

== Bibliography ==
- І. Масяляніцына. (1996). "Княгіня-амазонка". Belarusʹ: Litaraturna-Mastatski I Gramadska-Palitychny Chasopis (Журнал) (in Belarusian). 7 (691) (Беларусь ed.). Мн.: Полымя: 19. ISSN 0320-7544.
- Легенды и были. Жанна Д'Арк из Белой Руси. "Архивировано". Archived from the original on 2019-04-15. 12 мая 2012 года.
- "Анастасия Слуцкая". Archived from the original on 2004-11-08.
- Анастасия Слуцкая. <meta /> "Архивировано". 12 мая 2012 года.
