= Principality of Slutsk =

European state

Coordinates: 53°0′N 27°30′E

The Principality of Slutsk (18.) in 1385.

The Principality of Slutsk (Belarusian: Слуцкае княства, romanized: Słuckaje knjastva) was originally a specific Turov Principality of land in the 12th through 14th centuries. It stood out in 1160 and took shape in the 1190s. It became a large feudal principality in the Grand Duchy of Lithuania.

== History ==
=== Surviving sources ===
In the Hypatian Codex's continuation of the Primary Chronicle (PVL), the town of Slutsk (Sluchesk) is mentioned sub anno 6624 (circa 1116) as having been set on fire by Gleb Vseslavich, the first known prince of Minsk, who had been fighting against the Dregoviches. As Gleb showed no remorse about these acts, Volodimer Monomakh of Kyiv assembled a coalition army, conquered Drutsk and forced Gleb to surrender under threat of besieging Minsk. After "warning Gleb about everything", Monomakh gave him back Minsk; nothing is said about what happened to Slutsk and the Dregoviches. This passage is considered the oldest reliable mention of Slutsk, and has traditionally been considered the "founding date" of Slutsk.

Every now and then, certain claims are made that Slutsk is in fact older than 1116. The town is supposedly mentioned in archival documents as early as 1086; the Bishop of NS Sestrentsovich purportedly mentioned it in 1096; news of Slutsk allegedly appears in the Slutsk hymnals of the 11th century; but the original documents proving this are not available. The so-called charter "On the establishment of the Turov eparchy", by which Volodimer I of Kiev supposedly created the Eparchy of Turov in the year 6513 (1005), and gave Sluchesk and other towns to it, is probably a 14th-century forgery, that was not included in surviving editions of the Kyiv Caves Patericon until the 17th century by editor Joseph Trizna. Nevertheless, this charter was used by the city council of Slutsk in 2022 to justify moving the founding date of Slutsk 111 years backwards from 1116 to 1005.

After 1116, the next reliable mentions of Slutsk are found in the Kyivan Chronicle, where the first indication of it serving as a princely residence appears in 1162. The 16th-century Slutsk Chronicle (also called the Uvarov manuscript) was probably partially recorded in Slutsk. The margins of the manuscript contain some information about the history of the Princes of Slutsk. On this basis, it has commonly been assumed that the manuscript was created in the city of Slutsk (or Sluck, originally Sluchesk), in modern-day Belarus. This is where it got its name Slutsk Chronicle from.

=== Origins ===
The principality occupied the territory of the Neman and Lani to Bird and Pripyat, the city included Slutsk, Kapyl Petric, Timkovichi, Urechye, Luban, Old Road, Umgovichi, Tal, Tundra and others.

The Kyivan Chronicle narrates sub anno 1149 that Sviatoslav Olgovich of Chernihiv took "the cities Slutsk and Kletsk and all the Dregovich land" from Iziaslav (probably Iziaslav II, who had just been deposed as prince of Kyiv by Yuri Dolgoruky). At this time, it does not appear to have been the place of residence of a prince, and therefore not a principality. While the Kyivan Chronicle reports sub anno 1159 that Rogvolod Borysovych attempted to claim a land for his own by going to Slutsk, he was only (briefly) accepted as prince in Drutsk and later Polatsk (until 1162, when Rogvolod was ousted, fled, and briefly stayed in Slutsk for three days).

In 1160–1162, Volodimer Mstislavich (a grandson of Volodimer Monomakh) apparently took ownership of Slutsk. Against him a coalition of princes was formed in 1162, led by his brother, the Prince of Kiev Rostislav Mstislavich. Their armies threatened to besiege Slutsk, so Volodimer Mstislavich decided to make peace with them. As Volodimer appears to be the first prince residing in Slutsk, historians have customarily concluded that the Principality of Slutsk originated with him around 1160. Two years later, in 1164, the principality was taken by the descendants of Prince George Jaroslavich Turov.

In 1387, a document referred to Prince Yury Slutsky, the last of the dynasty.

=== Lithuanian period ===
At the beginning of the 13th century, the Slutsk principality, as well as other fiefdoms on Turov land, became dependent on the principality of Galicia-Volhynia. In 1320 the Slutsk principality joined the Grand Duchy of Lithuania. In 1395, the Grand Duke of Lithuania Vytautas, passed Slutsk principality to the brother of the Polish King Jagiello Prince Vladimir Olgerdovich. It was part of the Grand Duchy of Lithuania, and for two centuries, Slutsk was one of the political and cultural centers of the state. Until the end of the 14th century, it was ruled by Rurikids of the Turov-Pinsk line. After Vladimir Olgerdovich's death in 1440, together with Slutsk, Kapyl went to his son Aleksandras Olelka and subsequently his heirs Simeon, Mikhailo, Yurii and Simeon II.

Olelko Volodymyrovych, in 1440, received the principality of Kiev, and the governor left the principality of Slutsk to Olelko's eldest son, Semen. After the 1454 death of Olelko, Semen received the principality of Kiev and the youngest son Mikhail began to reign in Slutsk by 1481. After Semen's death, Mikhail expected the throne of Kiev, but was unsuccessful. He and supporters Prince Fedor Ivanovich Belsky and Ivan Yu. Holshansky decided to overthrow the Grand Duke of Lithuania Casimir IV and to build on the Lithuanian throne Mikhail, as a descendant of Grand Duke Algirdas. But the plot was exposed, and Mikhail was executed in 1481 in the town square of Vilnius. Slutsk principality executed Mstislav Anna (daughter of Prince Ivan Mstsislavsky) and young son Simeon II, who was prince from 1481 to 1503. Slutsk was the last of the independent principalities of the Grand Duchy of Lithuania. It was the only bastion of Orthodoxy in the area, besides being a bastion of Jewishness.

By the 17th century, Slutsk was still the largest town in the Principality of Slutsk and Kopyl, inhabited by a majority of Orthodox and Jews, whilst also including smaller Catholic and Protestant communities. From 1691 to 1764, the Slutsk kahal was one of the five members of the Council of Lithuania (Vaad Medinat Lita, which in 1623 had withdrawn from the Council of Four Lands, dominated by the Polish kahals of Poznań and Kraków, and the Ukrainian kahals of Lviv and Ostroh.)

== Princely court ==
The princely court from 1670 to 1705 hosted a printing house. From 1738 to 1755, a cloth manufacturer was there. In the years 1730–1884, a manufacturer of silk belts and from 1751 to 1760 Radziwill theater shared the space.

In 1791, the principality was liquidated, becoming Slutsk County (Случарэцкі павет), and in 1793/95 the Novogrudsky Uyezd of the Russian Empire.

With the second partition of Poland in 1793 Slutsk land was ceded to Russia, forming Slutsky District in the Minsk Voblast. Stephanie Radziwill, last in the royal line in Slutsk, moved to live with her husband the Count Ludwig Wittgenstein.

== Princely clans of Slutsk ==
The following Princes and Princesses of Slutsk are known by name:

Monomakhovichi

- 1161–1162: Volodymyr Mstyslavych, also briefly prince of Kyiv in early 1171 during the succession crisis following the death of Gleb of Kyiv

Gediminids

- 1394–1399: Volodymyr Olgerdovych, also prince of Kyiv, son of Algirdas

Olelkovichi and Slutsky

From 1399 onwards, Slutsk and Kapyl were reigned over by the Olelkovichi, starting with Aleksandras Olelka (son of Volodymyr Olgerdovych), until the Slutsky branch died out in 1612 with Zofia of Słuck.

- c. 1399~1443 : Aleksandras Olelka
- c. 1440~1454: Simeon Olelkovich, also the last Prince of Kyiv
- 1455–1481: Mikhailo Olelkovich
- 1481–1503: Simeon II Olelkovich
- 1503–1542: Yuri I Olelkovich
- 1586–1612: Zofia of Słuck (under regency of Chodkiewicz governors until she married Janusz Radziwiłł (1579–1620) in 1600 at the age of 14; may have been a princess regnant from the age of majority until her death)

There was also a Princess Olena Mykolayivna Rodivilovych of Slutsk.

Radziwiłł

From 1612 onwards, Slutsk was reigned over by the Radziwiłł family.

- 1612–1620: Janusz Radziwiłł (1579–1620) (became Prince of Slutsk upon the death of his wife Zofia of Słuck in 1612)

== See also ==
- Slutsk
- Slutsk Chronicle
- Olelkovich

== Literature ==
- Ulashchik, N.N., ed. (1980b). "Слуцкая летопись (иначе Уваровская) (опис)" [Slutsk Chronicle (alias Uvarov) (description)]. Bilorusjko-lytovsjki litopysy Білорусько-литовські літописи [The Belarusian–Lithuanian Chronicles]. Complete Collection of Rus' Chronicles (PSRL) (in Russian). Vol. 35. Moscow: Nauka / Izbornyk. p. 7. Archived from the original on 8 August 2025.
- Mytsyk, Yuri Andriyovych (2010). "Слуцький літопис" [Slutsk Chronicle]. Encyclopedia of History of Ukraine (in Ukrainian). Vol. 9. Kyiv: Institute of History of Ukraine. p. 664. Archived from the original on 22 August 2025.
- Pendzich, Barbara M. (1993). "The Jewish community of Sluck after the Polish-Muscovite War of 1654-1667". Proceedings of the World Congress of Jewish Studies. 11. World Union of Jewish Studies: 173–180. ISSN 0333-9068. JSTOR 23536313.
