= Aleksandras Olelka =

Prince of Kyiv from 1443 to 1454

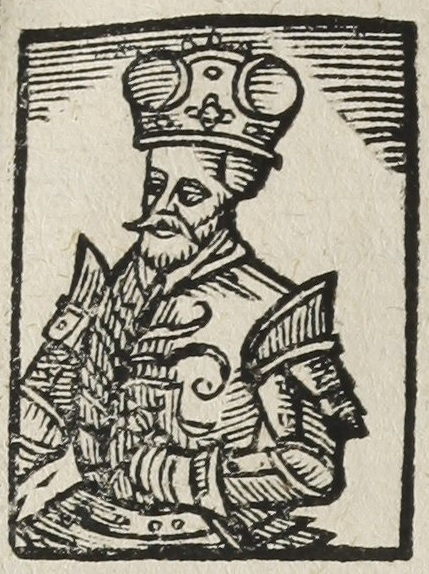
- Aleksandras Olelka, depicted in 1578

Duke of Kapyl–Slutsk
- Reign: Early 15th century–1454
- Predecessor: Vladimir Olgerdovich

Prince of Kiev
- Reign: 1443–1454
- Predecessor: Vladimir Olgerdovich
- Successor: Simeon Olelkovich
- Born: Early 15th century
- Died: 1454; Kyiv, Grand Duchy of Lithuania
- Burial: Kyiv Pechersk Lavra
- Spouse: Anastasia Vasilievna
- Issue more...: Simeon Olelkovich; Mikhailo Olelkovich; Evdochia of Kiev; Feodora Olelkovna; Yuliana Olelkovna; Barbara Aleksandrówna
- Dynasty: Olelkovich branch of Gediminids
- Father: Vladimir Olgerdovich

Aleksandras Olelka (Ukrainian: Олександр Олелько Володимирович; Early 15th century – 1454) was the Duke of Kapyl–Slutsk and subsequently from 1443 was the Prince of Kiev until his death in 1454.

Olelka was a patrilineal member of the Lithuanian ruling dynasty the Gediminids and founded its Olelkovich branch. Nevertheless, he was an Eastern Orthodox Christian, unlike the Grand Dukes of Lithuania who since the Christianization of Lithuania were Catholics.

== Biography ==
Olelka was the eldest son of Vladimir Olgerdovich, Prince of Kyiv, and grandson of Algirdas, Grand Duke of Lithuania. In 1394, the Lithuanian Grand Duke Vytautas the Great took away the rule of the Principality of Kiev from Olelka's father Vladimir Olgerdovich and instead gave him to rule the Duchy of Kapyl–Slutsk. Since 1395 the Alšėniškiai representatives began ruling the Principality of Kiev, however Vladimir Olgerdovich and his descendants retained aspirations to regain the rule of the Principality of Kiev.

Olelka was the founder of the Olelkovich branch of the Gediminids. Initially, Olelka held titles of the Duke of Kapyl and Slutsk. Olelka was of Eastern Orthodox faith. Olelkovichs supported the spread of writing.

Olelka was married with Anastasia Vasilievna, a daughter of Vasily I of Moscow (Grand Prince of Vladimir and Moscow) and Sophia of Lithuania (Regent of Moscow), and granddaughter of the Lithuanian Grand Duke Vytautas the Great. With her he had two sons: Simeon Olelkovich and Mikhailo Olelkovich, as well as four daughters: Evdochia of Kiev, Feodora Olelkovna, Yuliana Olelkovna, Varvara Olelkovna.

In 1422, Olelka, together with his brothers Ivan and Andrius, was a witness of the Treaty of Melno between the Teutonic Knights and an alliance of the Kingdom of Poland and the Grand Duchy of Lithuania at Lake Melno. The treaty resolved territorial disputes between the Teutonic Knights and Lithuania regarding Lithuania Minor and Samogitia, and determined the Prussian–Lithuanian border, which afterwards remained unchanged for about 500 years.

In 1428, together with other dukes, Olelka accompanied the Lithuanian Grand Duke Vytautas the Great on his march to the Novgorod Republic.

Olelka actively participated in internal politics of the Grand Duchy of Lithuania. In 1430–31, Olelka supported the Lithuanian Grand Duke Švitrigaila in his conflict against another claimant to the Lithuanian throne Sigismund Kęstutaitis and in 1431 witnessed the Treaty of Christmemel between Paul von Rusdorf, Grand Master the Teutonic Knights, and the Lithuanian Grand Duke Švitrigaila. However, since 1431 Olelka started to support Sigismund Kęstutaitis and personally witnessed his treaties with the Kingdom of Poland in Grodno in 1432 and 1433. Moreover, Olelka personally participated with Jonas Goštautas and Petras Mangirdaitis in the dethroning of Švitrigaila from the Lithuanian throne on the night of 31 August 1432 – 1 September 1432 in Ashmyany Manor. The insurgents captured the chancellery, regalia and the Lithuanian Grand Duchess Anna of Tver, a pregnant wife of Švitrigaila. In the last moments Jonas Manvydas warned Švitrigaila and he together with Jurgis Gedgaudas, a Voivode of Vilnius, and duke Manvydas escaped from the insurgents and on 3 September 1432 arrived to Polotsk, later departed to Smolensk. Sigismund Kęstutaitis and his supporters captured Trakai and the Lithuanian capital city Vilnius. It is believed that in 1433 Olelka continued to support Švitrigaila and in 1434 he arrived to Kyiv with aims to rule it, however he already found another supporter of Švitrigaila ruling Kyiv. In 1433–1435, Olelka was arrested by the Lithuanian Grand Duke Sigismund Kęstutaitis and imprisoned in Kernavė, his estates were confiscated and his family was held in Utena. Olelka remained imprisoned until 1440.

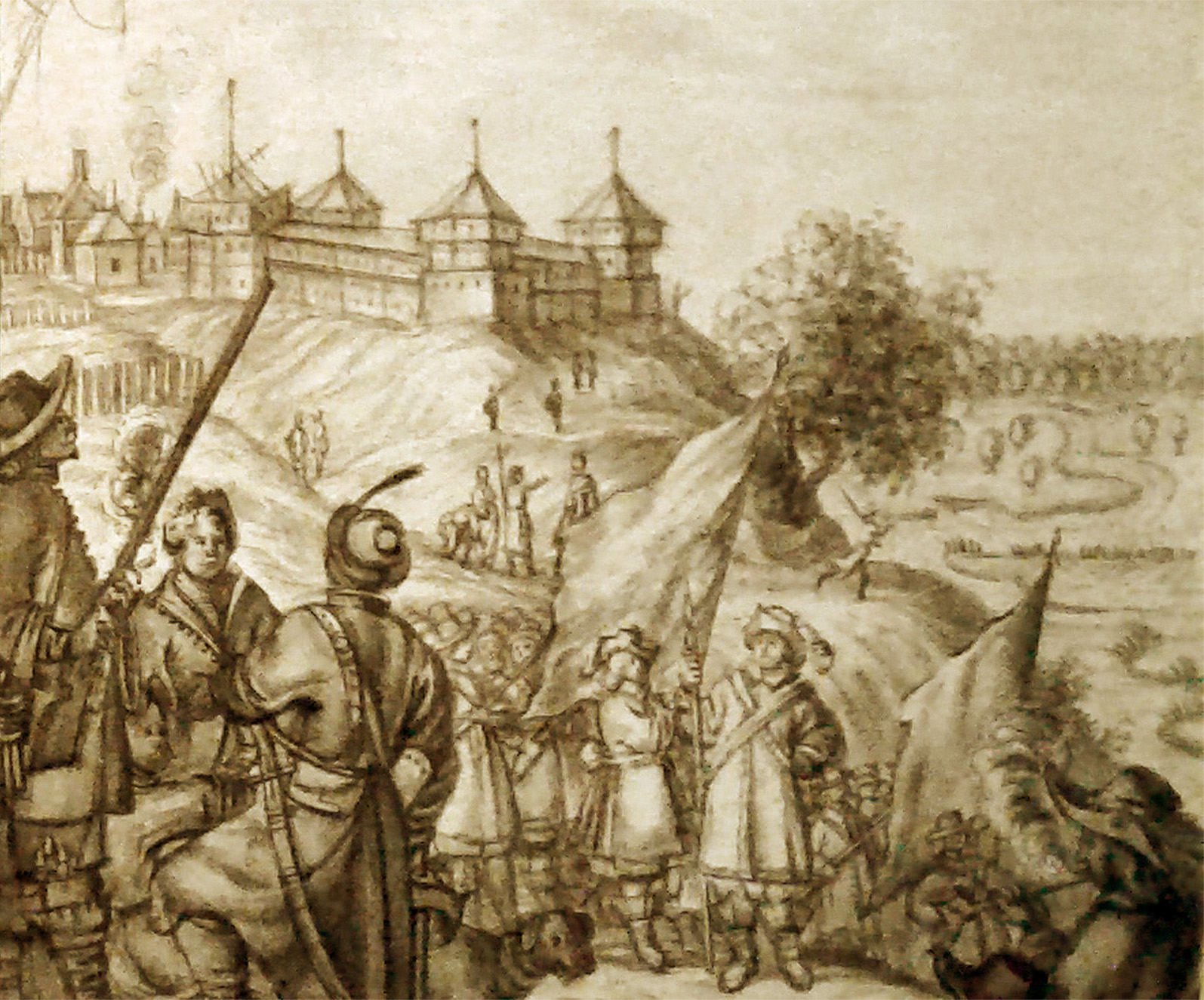
A 1651 drawing by Abraham van Westerveld of the Kyiv Castle which was a residence of the Princes of Kiev

Following the revolt and assassination of the Lithuanian Grand Duke Sigismund Kęstutaitis on 20 March 1440, Olelka and his family was freed and he returned to Kapyl. Subsequently Olelka joined the dukes led by Jonas Goštautas that captured the rule in the Grand Duchy of Lithuania and had elevated Casimir IV Jagiellon to the Lithuanian throne on 29 June 1440. According to the historian Maciej Stryjkowski, Olelka was discussed as a successor to the Lithuanian throne, however he had aspirations to only recover the rule of the Principality of Kiev, which was lost by his father Vladimir Olgerdovich. In 1440, the new Lithuanian Grand Duke Casimir IV Jagiellon gave the rule of Kyiv to Olelka and in early 1441 Olelka visited Casimir IV Jagiellon in the Lithuanian capital city Vilnius to humbly request in front of the Lithuanian Council of Lords to return his father's lands. In 1442, Olelka was appointed as the Prince of Kiev. He has ruled the Principality of Kiev until his death in 1454. He was a supporter of the Lithuanian Orthodox Church. Olelka was buried at the Kyiv Pechersk Lavra, where his father Vladimir Olgerdovich and the Lithuanian Grand Duke Švitrigaila were already laid to rest.

Olelka's son Simeon Olelkovich succeeded the rule of the Principality of Kiev and was the last Prince of Kiev in 1454–1470. In 1471, the Principality of Kiev was converted into the Kiev Voivodeship, a unit of administrative division and local government in the Grand Duchy of Lithuania. In 1463, Olelka's daughter Evdochia of Kiev married Stephen the Great, a Prince of Moldavia. Another Olelka's son Mikhailo Olelkovich objected the conversion of the remaining duchies within the Grand Duchy of Lithuania into the voivodeships and in 1481 was one of the commanders of an attempted coup d'état against the Lithuanian Grand Duke Casimir IV Jagiellon, however the coup d'état was discovered and Mikhailo Olelkovich was sentenced to a capital punishment.
