= Kyiv Castle =

Coordinates: 50°27′45″N 30°30′39″E

- Київський замок
- Zamkova Hora (Castle Hill) in Kyiv
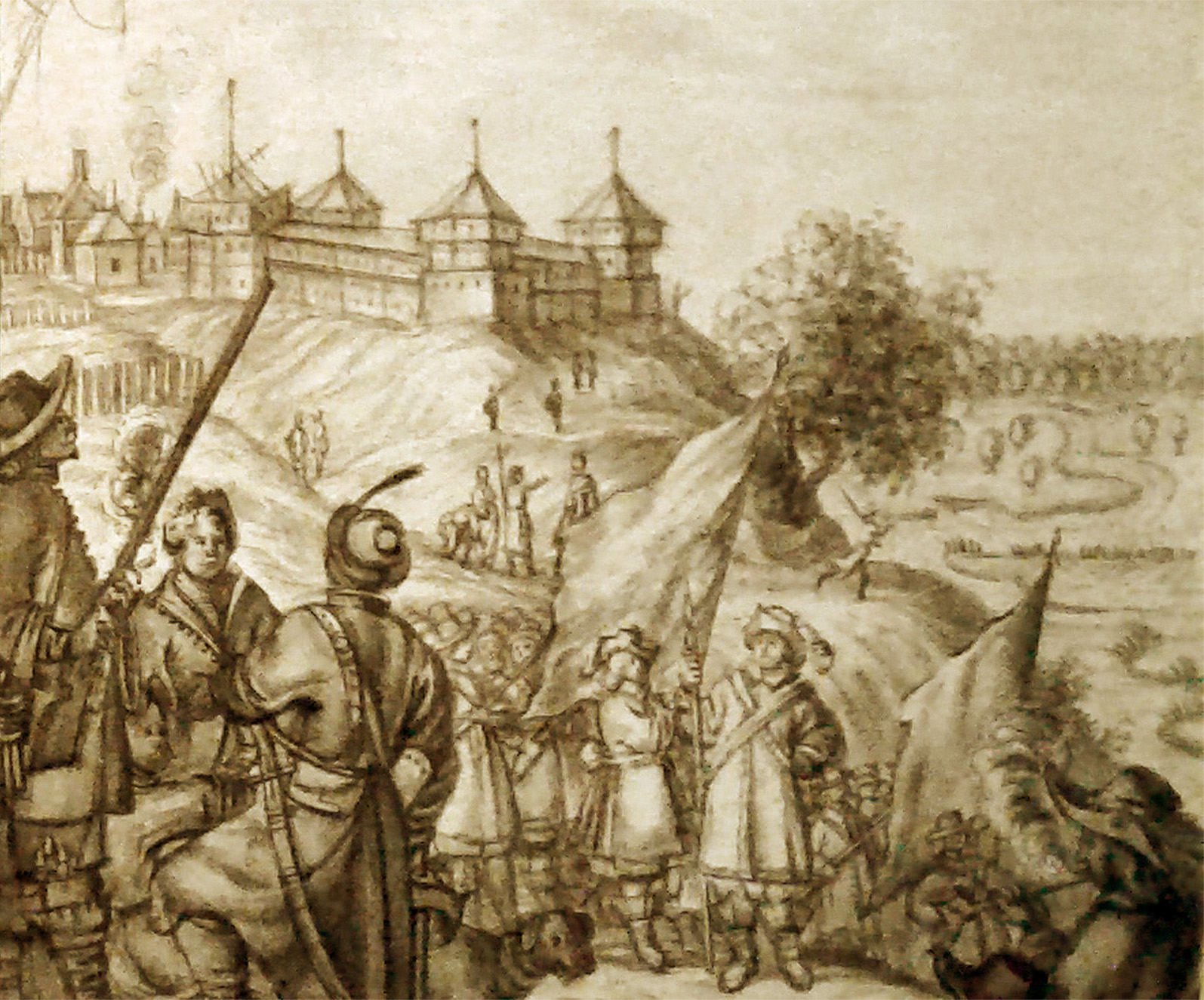
- Kyiv Castle by Abraham van Westerveld (1651)

Site information
- Type: Castle
- Condition: dismantled

Site history
- Built: 14th century
- Demolished: 1654

Kyiv Castle (Ukrainian: Київський замок, romanized: Kyjivsjkyj zamok) was the most powerful fortress in Dnieper Ukraine between the 14th and first half of the 16th century. It was built in the 14th century on Zamkova Hora (Castle Hill) in Kyiv (Lithuanian: Kyjivas). It had wooden fortifications, two gates, about 20 buildings, the only clock in the city until the 17th century, at various times from 3 to 15 three-tiered watchtowers, from 1 to 4 wells 60 metres deep, and during its heyday (1552) — 3 Orthodox and 1 Catholic churches. It existed from the end of the 14th to the middle of the 17th century. Following a period of decay, the remains of the dilapidated castle were dismantled in 1654.

== History ==
The castle was the residence of the Kievan prince Volodymyr Olgerdovych (1362–1394), his son Semen (1440–1455) and grandson Olelko (1455–1470). During the reign of Volodymyr Olgerdovych, the castle housed a mint where the first Ukrainian coin was minted.

In 1416, the castle withstood the sack of Kiev by the Golden Horde under the leadership of Emir Edigei.

In 1471, after the liquidation of the Principality of Kiev, Kyiv Castle became the official residence of the voivodes of Kiev, including Konstanty Ostrogski (1559–1608), Stanisław Żółkiewski (1608–1620), and Adam Kisiel (1649–1653).

Important historical events related to Kyiv Castle include: the Tatar sieges in 1416 and 1482; the capture by the Tatars in 1482 and the imprisonment of Kievan voivode Ivan Khodkevich and his wife; in 1592 and 1596, the castle was owned by the Cossack rebel leaders Krzysztof Kosinski and Severyn Nalyvaiko.

In 1523, the Kievan voivode Andrzej Niemirowicz wrote in a letter to the King of Poland, Grand Duke of Lithuania Sigismund I the Old, about the need to repair its damaged areas, the lack of a gunner, gunpowder, and the small number of ‘servants’. The king ordered that the situation be rectified, but this was not done in a timely manner. Therefore, at the Council on 10 December 1524, he harshly criticised the delay. The complete restoration of the castle and its provision took place in 1535. The castle's artillery in 1535 consisted of 4 ‘gufnyts’, 2 ‘tarasnyts’, 12 “pivtarasnyts”, 12 ‘serpentins’, and 59 hook guns.

According to a description from 1552, 12 criers served in the castle, ‘standing at the gate during the day and walking around at night with crenelles and calling out.’

At the Crown Sejm in Warsaw on 15 October 1592, Kievan voivode Prince Konstanty Ostrogski was issued a "certificate" that he had warned the Rzeczpospolita's government about the decline and decay of the Kyiv Castle. In 1594, Erich Lassota von Steblau claimed that the castle was located high on a separate mountain, very spacious, wooden, and plastered with lime. According to Reynold Haydnstein, the castle had almost completely decayed by 1596.

In 1605, the castle was struck by lightning and burned to the ground. Restoration work did not begin until 1616.

In 1630, the voivode Janusz Tyszkiewicz Łohojski allowed the Orthodox church of the castle to be demolished to build a church.

On 6 November 1649, Adam Kisiel arrived in Kiev and lived for several weeks in the empty Kyiv Castle. On 13 May 1650, he came to the city again with the commissioners, and was offended by the fact that he was met without proper honours. On 16 May, in the castle, he had talks with Bohdan Khmelnytsky, who was accompanied by colonels, centurions, and up to 2000 "blacks"; the castle was surrounded by Cossacks and Tatars (about 200 soldiers). In memory of Adam Kisiel, Zamkova Hora was given another name — ‘Kiselivka’.

The Castle Hill Museum (музей «Замкова гора») is located on the site of the former Kyiv Castle.

== Gallery ==
Kyiv Castle (reconstruction)

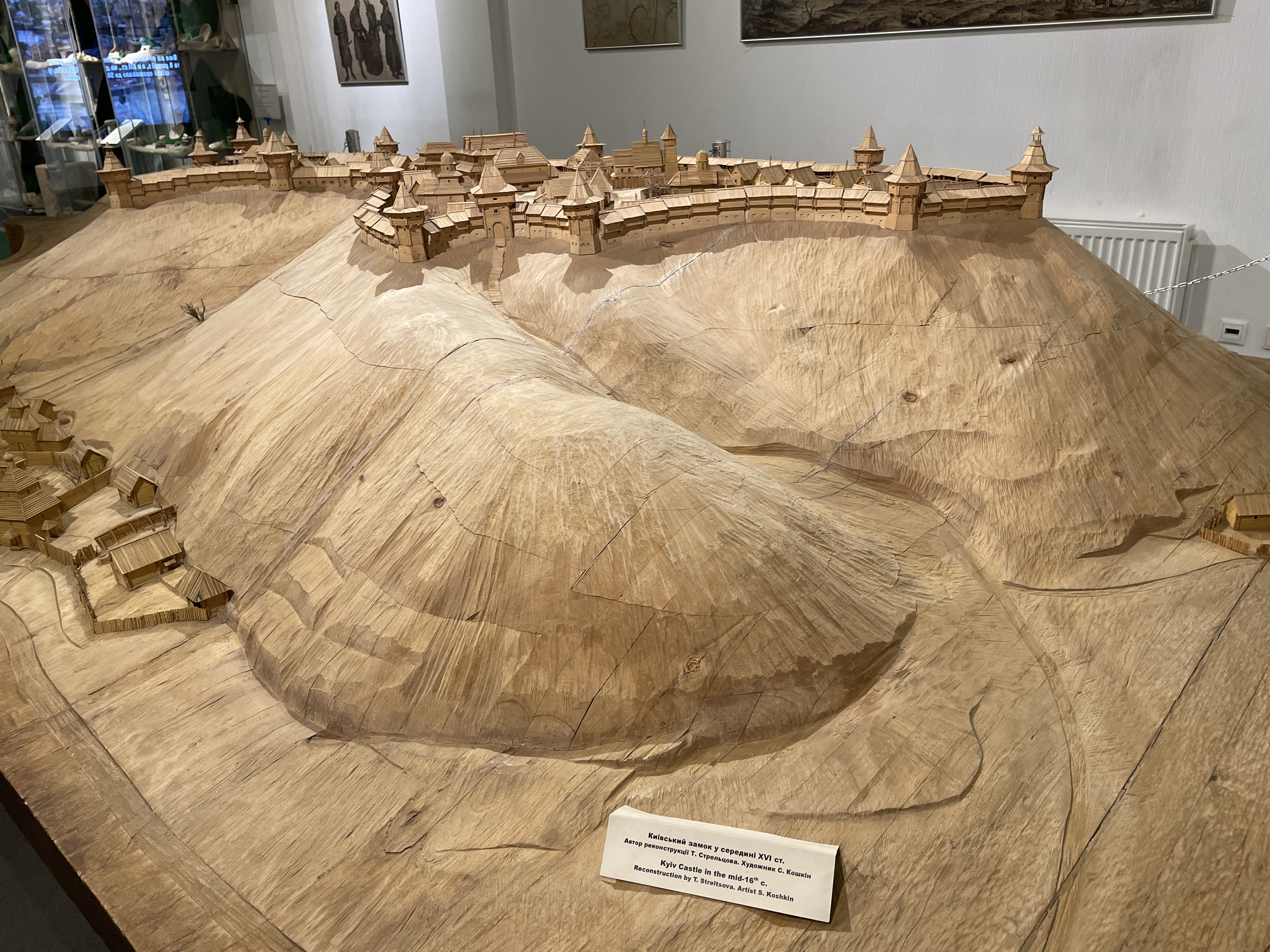
Kyiv Castle in the middle of the 16th century
Kyiv History Museum.
The author of the reconstruction is T. Streltsova. Artist S. Koshkin.
Castle Hill (Khorivytsia, Kyselivka)

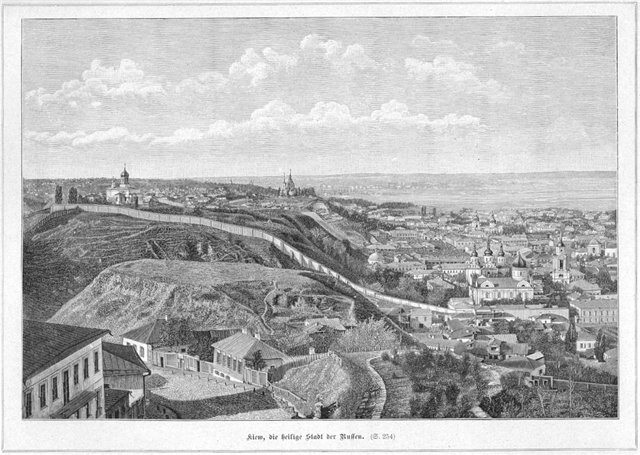
The view of Castle Hill in the 19th century,
engraving 1890

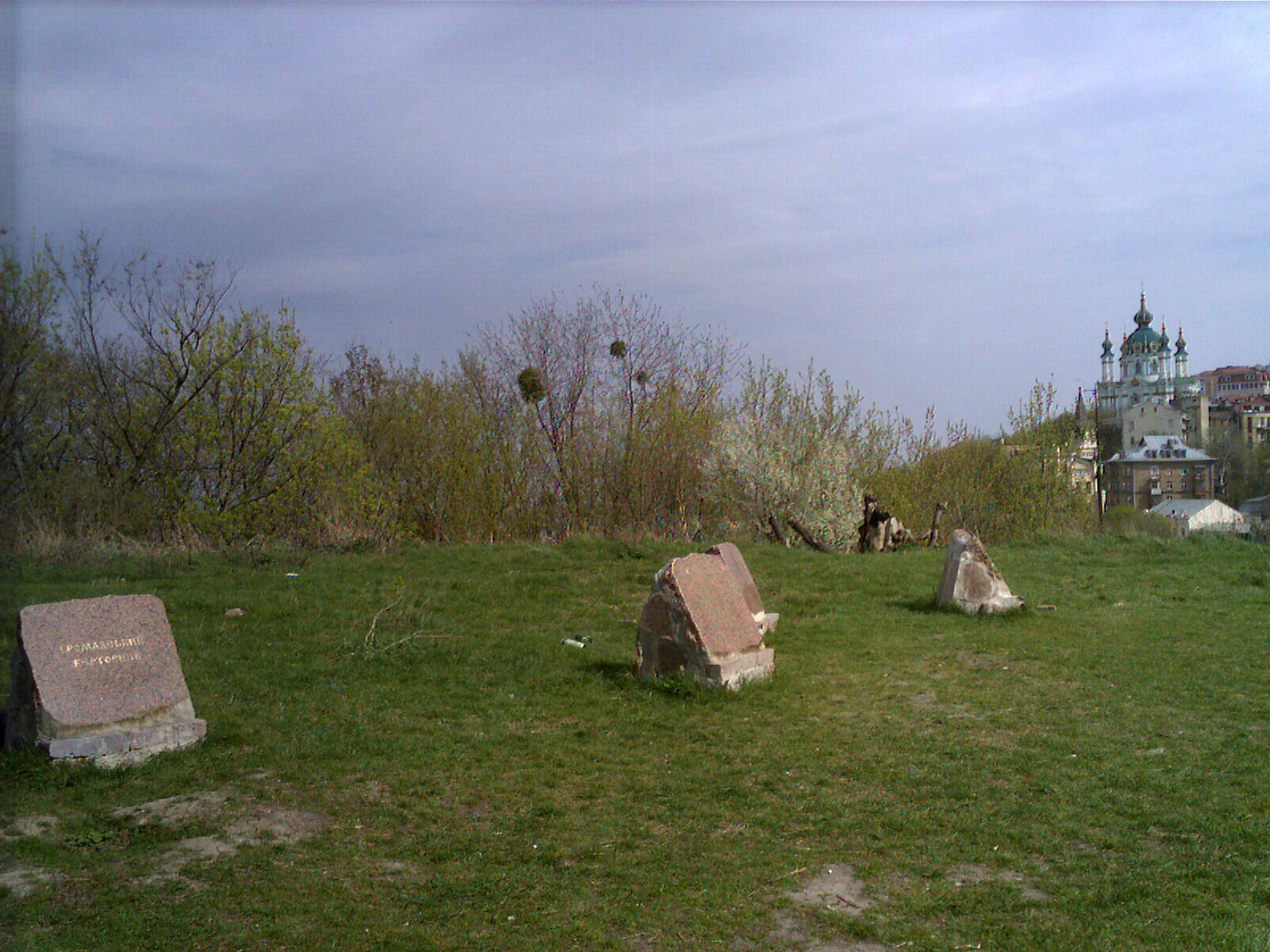
Memorial signs in honour of the legendary founders of Kyiv

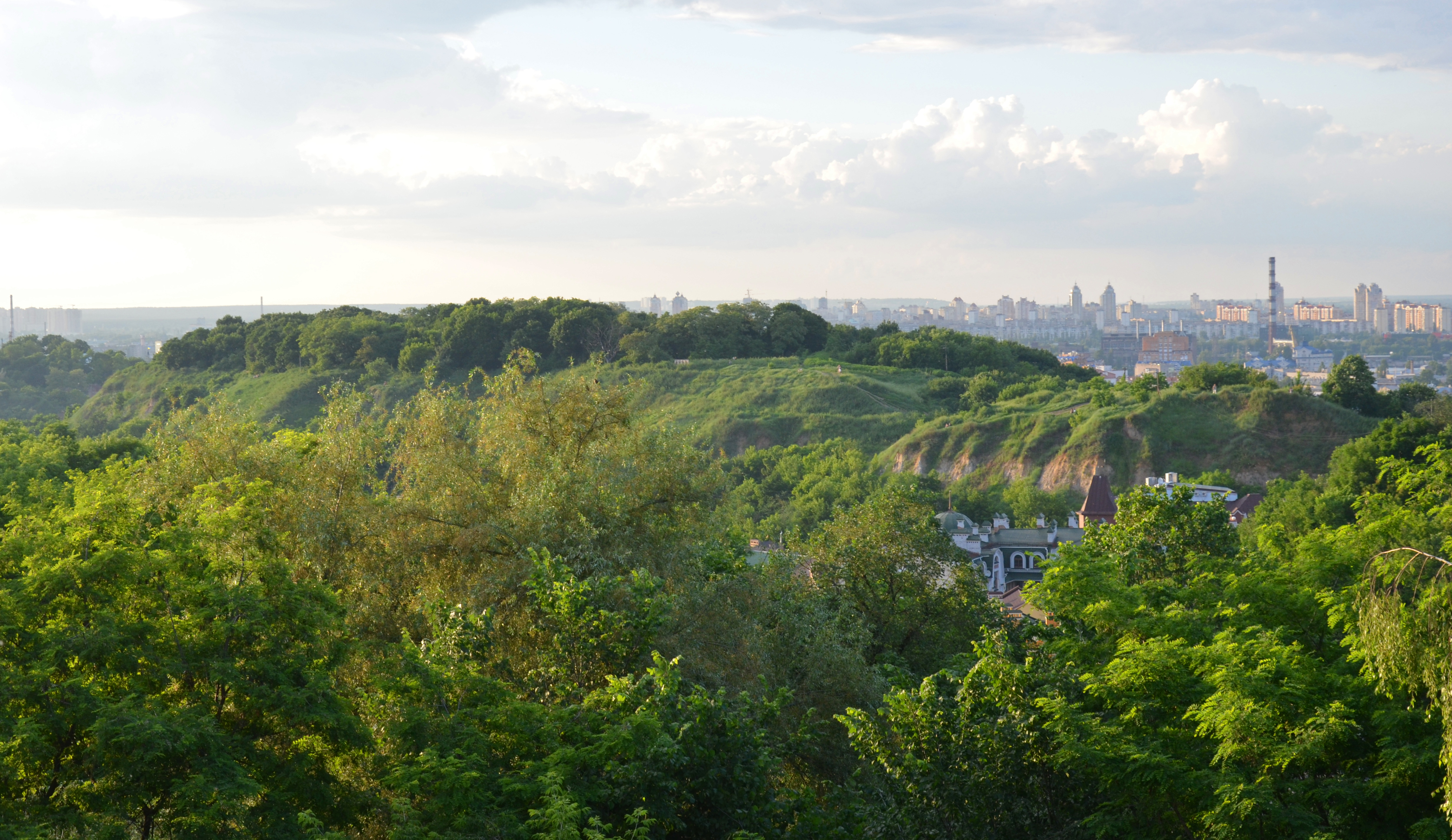
Castle Hill view (2014)

== See also ==
- History of Kyiv (1362–1657) – the Lithuanian and Polish period

== Sources ==
- Vortman, D. Ya. (2021). "Київський замок" [Kyiv Castle]. Encyclopedia of History of Ukraine (in Ukrainian). Vol. 1. Kyiv: Institute of History of Ukraine. p. 771. Archived from the original on 27 October 2026.
- Anon. (1886). "Description of the Kiev Castle in 1552". Архив Юго-западной России [Archive of South-Western Russia] (in Ukrainian). Vol. 7–1. Kyiv, Ukraine: Temporary Commission for the Analysis of Ancient Acts. pp. 101–122.
- Antonovych, Volodymyr Bonifatiyovych; Ternovsky, F. (1874). "Collection of materials for the historical topography of Kiev and its environs". Описаніе Кіева и Кіевскаго замка королевскими люстраторами 1545 [Description of Kiev and Kiev Castle by royal inspectors, 1545]. Kyiv, Ukraine: E.Y. Federov.
- Novitsky, Ivan Petrovych (1995). Shcherbak, V. (ed.). Адам Кисіль, воєвода київський [Adam Kysil, Voivode of Kyiv] (in Ukrainian). Kyiv, Ukraine: Naukova Dumka. ISBN 5-319-01072-9.
- Yakovenko, Natalia Mykolayivna (1980). "Inventory of Kyiv Castle on 21 June 1619". Archives of Ukraine (in Ukrainian) (2). Archived from the original on 19 February 2020.
- Замкова гора
- Київський замок. Зображення.
