= Anastasia Slutskaya (film) =

2003 film by Yuri Yelkhov

- Directed by: Yuri Yelkhov
- Written by: Anatoli Delendik
- Starring: Svetlana Zelenkovskaya
- Production company: Belarusfilm
- Release date: 2003
- Running time: 93 min
- Country: Belarus
- Languages: Belarusian, Russian and Tatar

Anastasia Slutskaya (Belarusian: Анастасія Слуцкая), also known as Princess Slutskaya, is a 2003 Belarusian historical drama film by Belarusfilm Production Company.

== Plot ==
The action takes place in the early 16th century. The Tatars attacked the prosperous Belarusian lands located at the intersection of trade routes, which were part of the Grand Duchy of Lithuania. The Crimean Tatar cavalry raided all Belarusian cities without exception. The aggressors stormed fortresses, robbed and enslaved the locals leaving behind only ashes.

However, the Tatars have to face the army squad and brave residents of Slutsk, who have not been defeated yet. The defenders are led by Princess Anastasia Slutskaya after the death of her husband, Prince Semen Olelkovich (1505).

== Cast ==
- Svetlana Zelenkovskaya – Anastasia Slutskaya
- Gennadiy Davydko – Semen Olelkovich
- Anatoly Kot – Knight Vladimir Drutskiy

== Voice-over ==
Anastasia Slutskaya – Lubov Germanova

== Production Unit ==
- Director: Yuri Yelkhov
- Writer: Anatoli Delendik
- Camera: Tatyana Loginova (Tulusheva)
- Music: Victor Copytsko
- Production designer: Valeriy Nazarov

== Awards ==
- International Film Festival of historical films "Veche" (Veliky Novgorod, Russia, August 2003): Jury Diploma and Faith Award.
- The 6th International Film Festival "Brigantina" (Berdyansk, Ukraine, September 2003):
  - Diploma and Jury Prize in the Best Film category to director Yuri Elkhov
  - Jury Prize in the Best Supporting Male Role category to Anatoly Kot
  - Jury Prize in the Best Debut category to Svetlana Zelenkovskaya
- Listapad Festival Grand Prix, Belarus
- The 37th Houston International Film Festival (Houston, Texas, USA, April 2004): Platinum Prize and a diploma in the Adventure film category
- State Prize 2005 of the Federation of Belarusian Trade Unions in the field of literature, art, and cinematography: Medal and Laureate Diploma.
- Hangzhou International Film Festival (China, October 2006): Crystal Jellyfish Prize.
