= Yuri I Olelkovich =

Prince of Kopyl and Slutsk from 1503 to 1542

Yuri Olelkovich
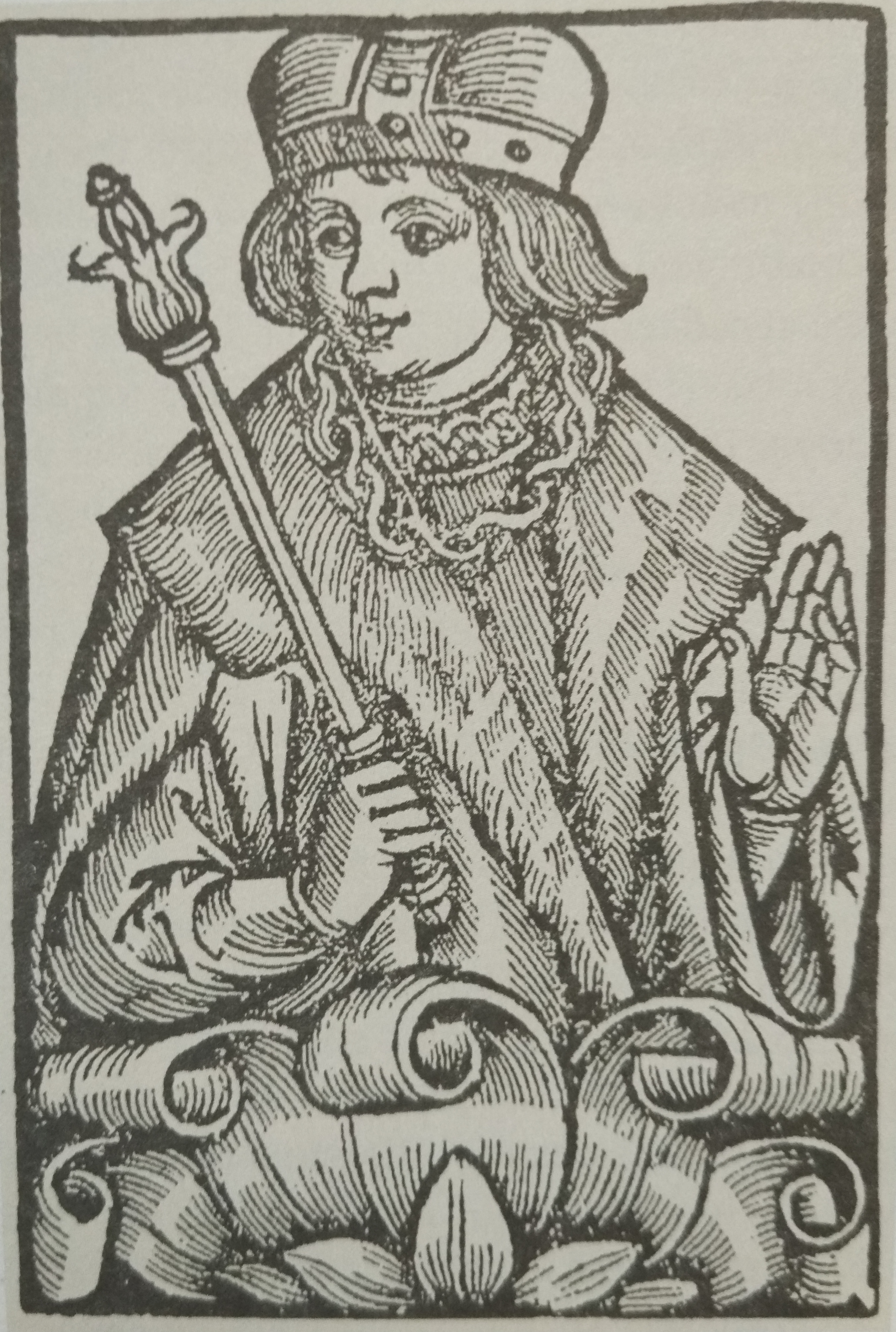
- Posthumous portrait by Bartosz Paprocki (1579)

Prince of Kopyl and Slutsk
- Reign: 1503–1542
- Predecessor: Simeon Mikhailovich Slutsky
- Successor: Simeon Yuryevich
- Born: c. 1492
- Died: 17 April 1542
- Noble family: Olelkovich
- Father: Simeon Mikhailovich Slutsky

Yuri Simeonovich (Note: Russian: Юрий Семёнович, romanized: Yury Semyonovich; Belarusian: Юрый Сямёнавіч Алелькавіч, romanized: Yuryy Syamyonavich Alelkavich; Polish: Jerzy Semenowicz Olelkowicz, Jurij Semenowicz Olelkowicz) (c. 1492 – 17 April 1542) was the prince of Kopyl and Slutsk from 1503 until his death in 1542. He was from the Olelkovich family of the Grand Duchy of Lithuania and was a son of Simeon Mikhailovich Slutsky and Anastasia Slutskaya.

== Life ==
Yury was born c. 1492. He became the prince of Kopyl and Slutsk in 1503 after his father Simeon died. He was an influential member of the Lithuanian Council of Lords.

He participated in the Battle of Olshanitsa and in the Battle of Orsha

In about 1531, Simeon married Helena from the Radziwiłł family, a daughter of Mikolaj II Radziwill.

Yury died on 17 April 1542, and was succeeded by his son Simeon as prince.

== Issue ==
Simeon, briefly married to Elizaveta Ostrogska,daughter of Ilia Ostrogski. Simeons aunt had been married to Ostrogskas grand-father. The marriage was annulled on the order of Sigismund II Augustus, the king of Poland.

Yuri, married Katarzyna Tęczyńska and had issue.

Sophia, married Jerzy Chodkiewicz and had issue.

== Bibliography ==
- Pazdnyakow, Valery (2005). Вялікае княства Літоўскае: Энцыклапедыя (in Belarusian). Minsk: Беларуская Энцыклапедыя. pp. 217–219. ISBN 985-11-0314-4.
