= Vyacheslav Kuznetsov (composer) =

Belarusian composer

- Born: 15 June 1955 (age 70)
- Occupation: Composer

Vyacheslav Vladimirovich Kuznetsov (Belarusian: Вячаслаў Кузьняцоў; Russian: Вячеслав Владимирович Кузнецов; born 15 June 1955 in Vienna) is a Belarusian classical music composer.

== Selected works ==
- Diary of a Madman (Записки сумасшедшего), Opera in 1 act after Nikolai Gogol
- Capriccio (Капрыччио) for viola solo (1988)
- Heterophony (Гетэрафонія) for oboe, violin and viola (1993)
