= Simeon II Olelkovich =

Prince of Kopyl and Slutsk from 1481 to 1503

Simeon Mikhailovich
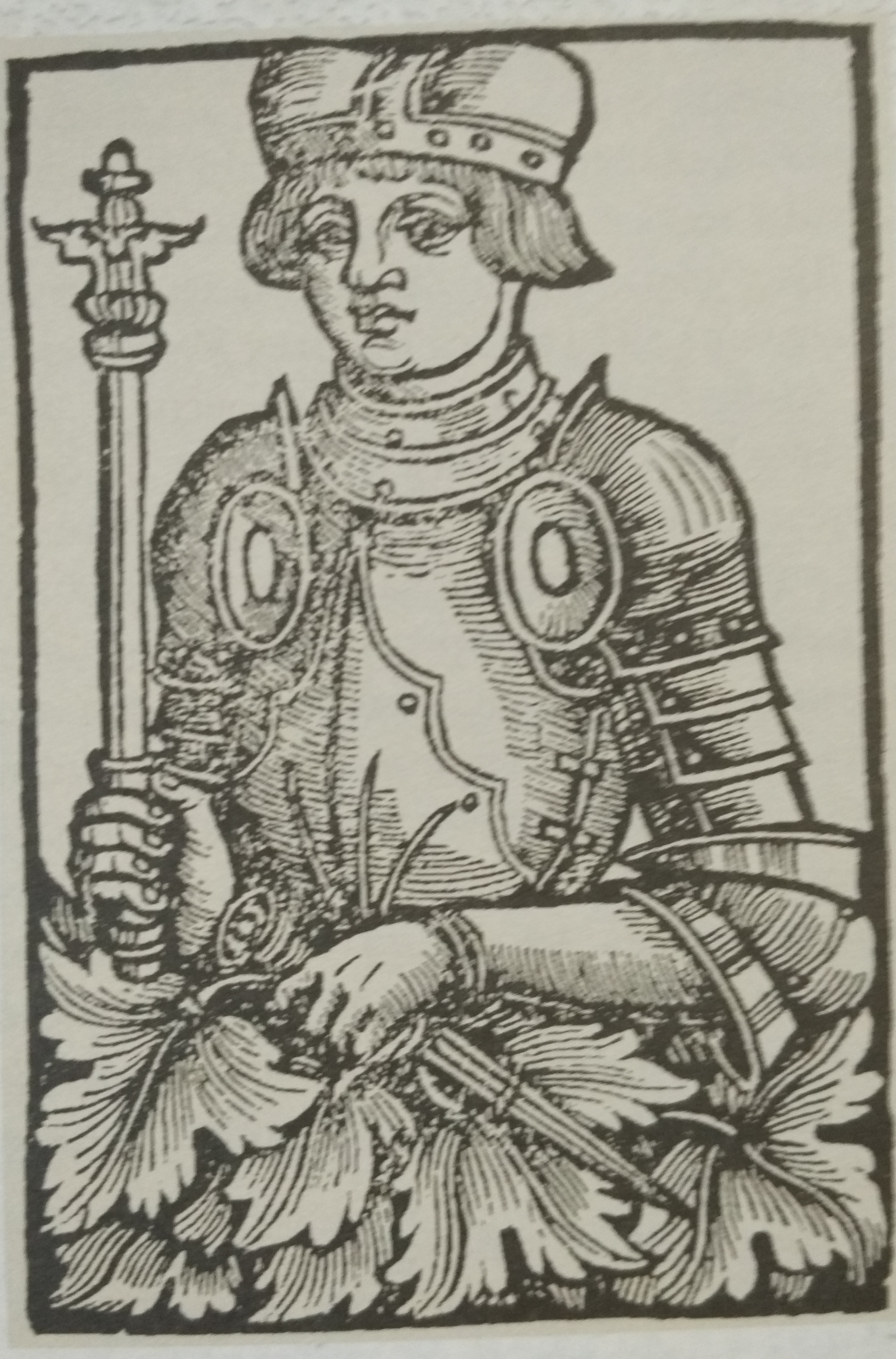
- Posthumous portrait by Bartosz Paprocki (1579)

Prince of Kopyl and Slutsk
- Reign: 1481–1503
- Predecessor: Mikhailo Olelkovich
- Successor: Yuri I Olelkovich
- Died: 14 November 1503
- Noble family: Olelkovich branch of Gediminids
- Issue: Yuri I Olelkovich
- Father: Mikhailo Olelkovich

Simeon Mikhailovich Slutsky (Note: Russian: Семён Михайлович Слуцкий, romanized: Semyon Mikhaylovich Slutsky; Belarusian: Сямён Міхайлавіч Слуцкі, romanized: Syamyon Mikhaylavich Slutski) (c. 1460 – 14 November 1503) was the prince of Kopyl and Slutsk from 1481 until his death in 1503. He was from the Olelkovich family of the Grand Duchy of Lithuania and the only son of Mikhailo Olelkovich.

== Life ==
Simeon was born c. 1460. He became the prince of Kopyl and Slutsk in 1481 after his father Mikhailo Olelkovich died. Simeon died on 14 November 1503 and was succeeded by his son Yuri as prince.

== Family ==
Simeon married Anastasia Ivanovna, a daughter of Ivan Yuryevich Mstislavsky. Together they had a son, Yuri (c. 1492 – 1542).

== Bibliography ==
- Pazdnyakow, Valery (2005). Вялікае княства Літоўскае: Энцыклапедыя (in Belarusian). Minsk: Беларуская Энцыклапедыя. pp. 217–219. ISBN 985-11-0314-4.
