= Simeon Olelkovich =

Prince of Kiev from 1454 to 1470

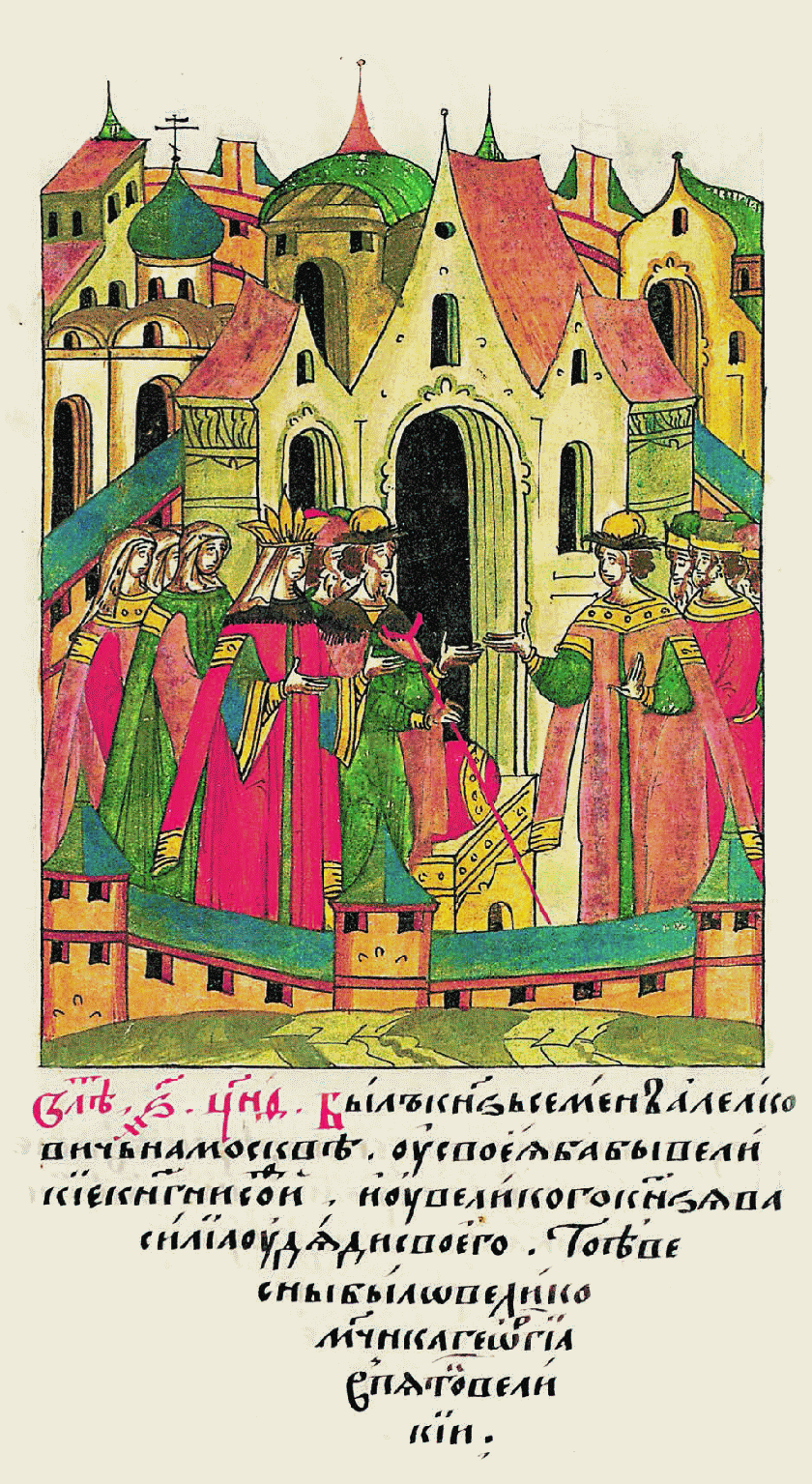
- Simeon visiting his grandmother and uncle in Moscow, miniature from the Illustrated Chronicle of Ivan the Terrible (16th century)

Prince of Kiev
- Reign: 1454–1470
- Predecessor: Alexander Olelko
- Successor: Position abolished
- Born: 1420; Slutsk
- Died: 1470 (aged 50); Kiev
- Burial: Kiev Pechersk Lavra
- Spouse: Maria, daughter of Jonas Goštautas
- Dynasty: Olelkovich branch of Gediminids
- Father: Aleksandras Olelka
- Mother: Anastasia Vasilievna
- Religion: Eastern Orthodox

Simeon or Simon Olelkovich (Note: Belarusian: Сямён Алелькавіч; Ukrainian: Семен Олелькович; Russian: Семён Олелькович; Lithuanian: Simonas Olelkaitis.) (1420–1470) was the last prince of Kiev from 1454 to 1470. He was also the prince of Slutsk from 1443 to 1455.

== Life ==
A member of the Olelkovich family, he descended from Ruthenianized Eastern Orthodox branch of the Gediminid dynasty, and was a great-grandson of Algirdas, the grand duke of Lithuania. After his father's death, he inherited the Principality of Kiev.

He conducted an independent policy, fought with the Crimean Tatars, maintained close ties with the Principality of Moldavia, the Genoese colonies and the Principality of Theodoro in the Crimea. However soon after, the Principality of Theodoro was conquered by the emerging Crimean Khanate.

He married Maria (d. 1501), daughter of Jonas Goštautas, by whom he had three children, Vasily Semyonovich (d. 1495), Alexandra, wife of Fedor Ivanovich Borovsky, and Sophia (d. 1483), wife of Mikhail III of Tver, the last prince of Tver.

After the death of Simon Olelkovich, the Principality of Kiev was transformed into the Kiev Voivodeship. His son received the Principality of Pinsk as compensation, but he died young and was succeeded first by his mother, Maria, and then by his brother-in-law, Fedor, after her death. None of his children had any issue.

== Sources ==
- F. Shabuldo. Simon Olelkovich // Encyclopedia of History of Ukraine, 2012. p 522. (in Ukrainian)
- Леонтій ВОЙТОВИЧ. КНЯЗІВСЬКІ ДИНАСТІЇ СХІДНОЇ ЄВРОПИ (кінець IX — початок XVI ст.): склад, суспільна і політична роль. Історико-генеалогічне дослідження. - Львів, 2000 р (in Ukrainian)
- Г. Івакін. Історичний розвиток Києва XIII — середина XVI ст. — К., 1996. — С. 42-108. (in Ukrainian)
- Długosz Jan. Dziejów polskich... — Tom V. — 1870 — S. 515 (in Polish)
- Semkowicz W. Gasztołd Jan (Iwaszko) // Polski Słownik Biograficzny. — Kraków, 1948–1958. — t. VII. — S. 298. (in Polish)

Simeon Olelkovich Gediminids Born: 1420 Died: 1470
Royal titles
Preceded by Aleksandras Olelka	Prince of Kiev; 1454–1470	Transformed to Kiev Voivodeship
Preceded by Aleksandras Olelka	Prince of Slutsk; 1443–1455	Succeeded by Mikhailo Olelkovich
