= Zofia of Słuck =

Lithuanian Orthodox saint (1585–1612)

Saint Zofia of Słuck
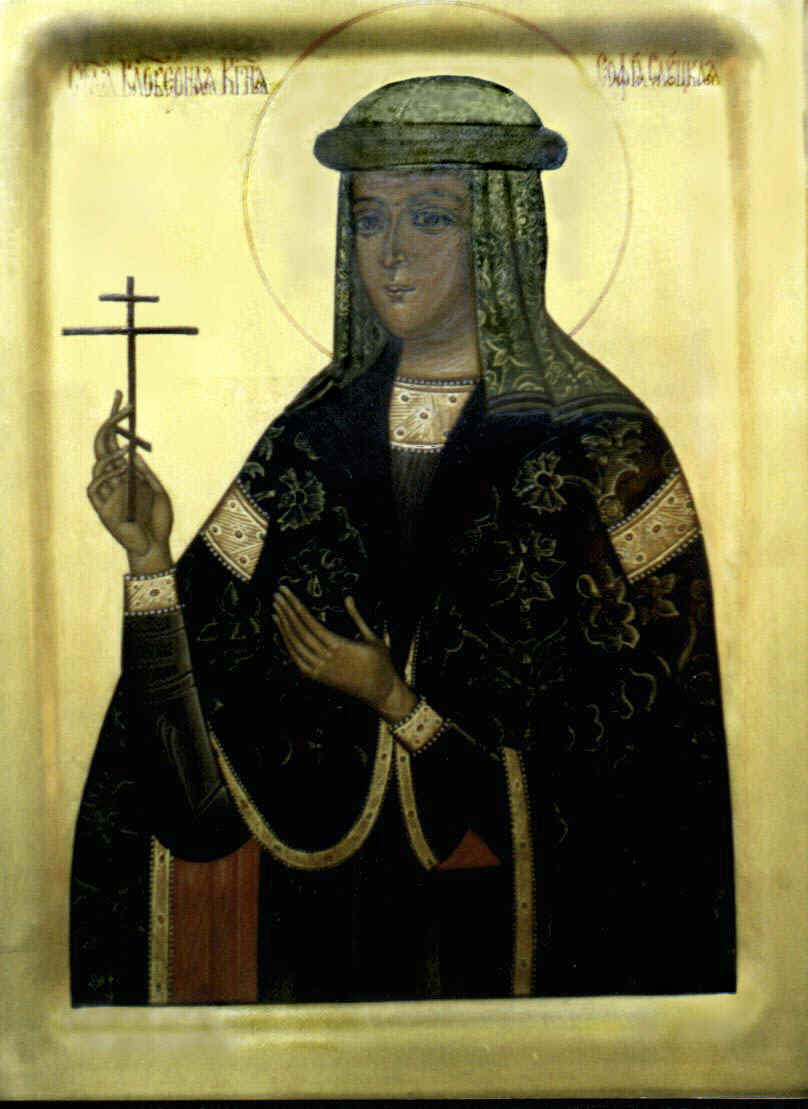
- Icon of Saint Zofia

Righteous, Princess of Slutsk
- Born: 1 May 1585; Slutsk, Polish–Lithuanian Commonwealth
- Died: 19 March 1612 (aged 26); Chervyen, Polish–Lithuanian Commonwealth
- Venerated in: Eastern Orthodox Church
- Canonized: 1983
- Major shrine: Holy Spirit Cathedral, Minsk
- Feast: 19 March
- Patronage: Pregnant women, women in labor, infants and children, orphans. Healer of headaches. Guardian from fires and hunger. Patroness of pious marriages. Intercessor in litigation with authorities and peacemaker.

Zofia Radziwiłł (née Olelkowicz), also Zofia of Słuck (Lithuanian: Sofija Olelkaitė-Radvilienė; Polish: Zofia Olelkowiczówna, 1 May 1585 – 19 March 1612) is a Polish-Lithuanian Orthodox Christian saint. She was the last descendant of the Olelkowicz–Słucki family – princes of Slutsk and Kopyl – who were descended from Lithuanian Grand Duke Algirdas.

She was canonized by the Orthodox Church in 1983. The church of St. Sophia of Slutsk in Minsk is named in her honour.

== Early life ==
Zofia was born on 1 May 1585. Her mother, Barbara (née Kiszka), died the same year, and her father, Prince Jurij Semenowicz Olelkowicz, died on 6 May 1586. Zofia was raised by distant relatives, first by the governor of Samogitia province Jerzy Chodkiewicz, of the Chodkiewicz family, who took her to Vilnius, and then by the governor of Brest province, Hieronim Chodkiewicz.

== Wedding ==
Because of debts the Chodkiewicz family owed to the Radziwill family, it became expedient to make a match between Zofia and Janusz Radziwill, Prince of Nesvizh and a son of the governor of Vilnius, Prince Krzysztof Radziwill. At that time Zofia was eleven years old. The wedding between Zofia and Janusz was scheduled for 6 February 1600 in Vilnius. Before this happened there was a falling out between the Chodkiewicz and the Radziwill families, almost certainly over the financial arrangements that the wedding was contingent upon. The matter proceeded to a court but the decision was in favour of the Radziwills, possibly because the judge rendering the verdict was Jerzy Radziwill.

Rather than accept the verdict the Chodkiewicz family retreated with Zofia to their castle in Vilnius. Janusz Radziwill’s father Krzysztof collected 6,000 troops in Vilnius and prepared for battle against the Chodkiewicz camp with their 2,500 troops. The tense situation was only calmed when four senators sent by the Polish King Sigismund III Vasa arrived and began to sue for peace through negotiations. A compromise was hammered out whereby the property claims of the Radziwills against the Chodkiewicz were declared void and the latter were indemnified for their handling of the assets of Princess Zofia.

== Orthodox faith ==
Janusz Radziwill petitioned Pope Clement VIII for permission to marry Zofia on 20 July 1600. Because Zofia was adamant in her decision to remain Orthodox and raise any children in the Orthodox faith this led to a written discussion on the subject of interdenominational marriage between the Pope and the Patriarch of Constantinople. The Union of Brest of 1596 realigning the Belarusian Church and the Ukrainian Church from the Patriarchate of Constantinople to the Holy See in Rome caused enormous grief for Zofia as she did not wish to convert to Catholicism, which was being practiced by most of the Polish and Lithuanian nobility (although apparently not by her husband-to-be Janusz, who was at that stage Calvinist).

The marriage between Zofia and Janusz took place in one of the cathedrals of Brest in accordance with the Orthodox rite on 1 October 1600. Due to the strength of Zofia’s passion about her Orthodox beliefs, she was instrumental in the promulgation of measures allowing the inhabitants of her ancestral lands (in present-day Belarus) to choose to stay Orthodox rather than convert to Catholicism. Other measures were enacted forbidding Eastern Catholic priests from replacing Orthodox priests when the latter died. Zofia was generous in her donations to churches, monasteries, and the clergy. In part due to her efforts, Slutsk became a bastion of Orthodoxy and a religious centre.

Zofia died in childbirth at Myleniec (Omelevo), near the town of Chervyen on 19 March 1612 at the age of 26. Originally buried in the castle church of the Holy Trinity in Slutsk, her relics are currently deposited in the Holy Spirit Cathedral in Minsk.

Her feast day is 19 March in the Church calendar.
