= Olelkovich =

Lithuanian princely family

Olelkovich Olelkaičiai Олельковичі
- Coat of arms
- Parent family: Gediminids and Rurikids
- Origin: Ruthenia
- Founder: Aleksandras Olelka
- Members: Simeon Olelkovich; Mikhailo Olelkovich; Simeon II Olelkovich; Yuri I Olelkovich; Zofia Olelkowicz
- Connected families: Radziwiłł
- Traditions: Eastern Orthodox Church
- Estate: Principality of Slutsk

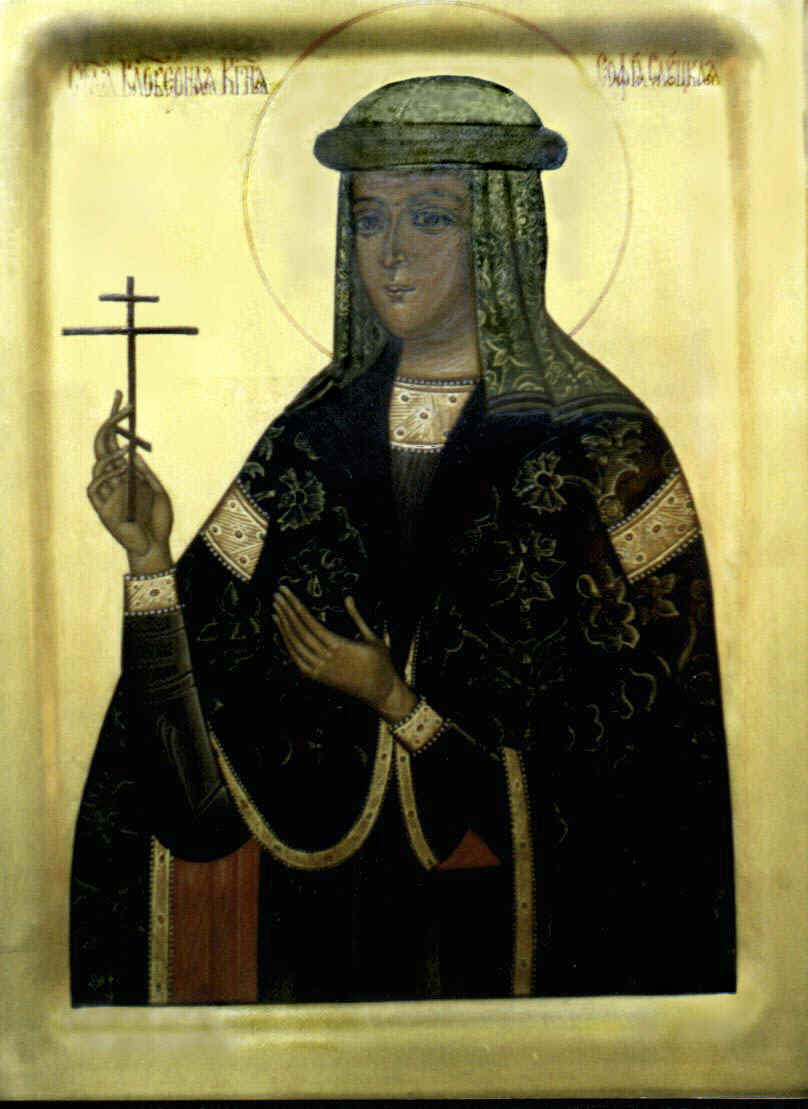
Saint Sofia, princess of Slutsk

The House of Olelkovich (Note: Belarusian: Алелькавічы; Lithuanian: Olelkaičiai; Polish: Olelkowicze; Ukrainian: Олельковичі.) was a princely family from the Grand Duchy of Lithuania in the 15th and 16th centuries. Their main possession was the Duchy of Slutsk–Kapyl. They are sometimes known as Slutskys. (Note: Polish: Olelkowicze-Słuccy.) They were descended from the Lithuanian Gediminids (male line) and Ruthenian Rurikids (female line). According to the 1528 military census, the family was the fourth wealthiest magnate family in the Grand Duchy. However, its influence declined after the Union of Lublin (1569). The last member of the family was Zofia Olelkowicz (1585–1612), wife of Janusz Radziwiłł. She was elevated to sainthood in the Eastern Orthodox Church in 1983. As part of her marriage negotiations, she insisted on remaining a member of the Eastern Orthodox Church, despite her future husband's allegiance to Calvinism. She died in childbirth, as did the child. After her death, her considerable wealth and the Principality of Slutsk passed to the Radziwiłł family.

== Family history ==
Aleksandras Olelka was the ancestor of the family. He was a son of Vladimir, the prince of Kiev, and grandson of Algirdas, the grand duke of Lithuania. Alexander inherited his father's domains in the Principality of Slutsk–Kapyl, and in 1440, restored the family's dynastic interest in the Principality of Kiev, which was confiscated from Vladimir in 1395 after a power struggle with Grand Duke Vytautas and given to Skirgaila. Alexander married Anastasia, daughter of Sophia of Lithuania and Vasily I of Moscow, and had two sons: Simeon (died 1470) and Mikhailo (died 1481).

Simeon married Maria, a daughter of Jonas Goštautas. In the mid-1450s, Goštautas planned to depose Grand Duke Casimir IV Jagiellon and to install his son-in-law Simeon Olelkovich. Simeon inherited the Principality of Kiev, but after his death it was converted into the Kiev Voivodeship. His descendants continued to claim the rights to the region, but the voivodeship was ruled by appointed officials (voivodes) from other noble families. The loss of Kiev could be attributed to Olelkovich's faith (Eastern Orthodoxy rather than Catholicism) and their close kinship with the grand princes of Moscow, who threatened Lithuania's eastern borders. However, the Principality of Slutsk–Kapyl was not converted into a powiat and remained in the family's hands. Disappointed by prevailing politics, Mikhailo Olelkovich organized opposition to Casimir IV and even attempted a coup in 1481. The plot was uncovered, possibly by the voivode of Kiev, Ivan Chodkiewicz, and Mikhailo was executed. In 1471, Mikhailo had also been involved in a brief alliance when Novgorod Republic invited him to become its ruler in a bid to break away from Moscow's influence. However, the attempt ended in a decisive defeat at the Battle of Shelon.

After Mikhailo's death, the Olelkovichs did not occupy any state offices. They submitted bids for the throne of the Grand Duke in 1492 and 1572, but gained little support. Simeon moved his court from Kapyl to Slutsk, thus establishing the so-called Slutsk line. His descendants are often known as Slutsky. During the Muscovite–Lithuanian Wars, Simeon also won a battle near Babruysk in September 1502 against the Crimean Khanate. Yuri also had possessions in Veisiejai, where he funded the building of a Catholic church, and Liškiava.

== Family tree ==
Vladimir, son of Algirdas
Olelko Vladimirovich (died in 1455)	Ivan of Bely (died after 1445)	Andrei Vladimirovich
Simeon Olelkovich (died in 1470)	Mikhailo Olelkovich (died in 1481)	Evdochia (wife of Stephen III of Moldavia)	Theodosia	Belsky family
Vasily (Prince of Pinsk, died in 1495)	Sophia (wife of Mikhail III of Tver, died in 1483)	Alexandra (wife of Fedor Ivanovich Borovsky)	Simeon II Olelkovich (died in 1503)
Yuri I Olelkovich (died in 1542)
Yuri II (died in 1578)	Simeon III (died in 1560)	Sophia (wife of Yurii Chodkiewicz)
Yuri III (died in 1586)	Simeon IV (died in 1592)	Alexander (died in 1591)
Sophia Olelkovich (1585–1612)
