= Kiev Voivodeship =

Subdivision of the Grand Duchy of Lithuania and the Kingdom of Poland

Coordinates: 50°27′00″N 30°31′24″E

Kiev Voivodeship Kyiv Voivodeship Palatinatus Kioviensis (Latin) Województwo kijowskie (Polish) Київське воєводство (Ukrainian)
- Voivodeship of Lithuania (1471–1569), then Poland (1569–1793)
- 1471–1793
- Coat of arms

- The Kiev Voivodeship in the Polish–Lithuanian Commonwealth in 1635.
- Capital: Kijów (Kyiv; 1471–1667); Żytomierz (Zhytomyr; 1667–1793)
- Demonym: Kievan
- Area
  - 1793: 200,000 km^{2} (77,000 sq mi)
- Population
  - 1793: 500,000
- Government
- Voivode
  - 1471–1475: Martynas Goštautas (first)
  - 1559–1608: Konstanty Wasyl Ostrogski (transition)
  - 1791–1793: Antoni Protazy Potocki (last)
- History
  - death of Simeon Olelkovich: 1471
  - 2nd Muscovite–Lithuanian War: 1503
  - Union of Lublin: 1569
  - Khmelnytsky Uprising: 1648
  - Truce of Andrusovo: 1667
  - Second partition: 1793
- Political subdivisions: counties: 9 (1471–1569); 7 (1569–1667); 3 (1667–1793)
| Preceded by | Succeeded by |
| Principality of Kiev | Cossack Hetmanate; Kiev Viceroyalty |
- Today part of: Ukraine, partially Belarus

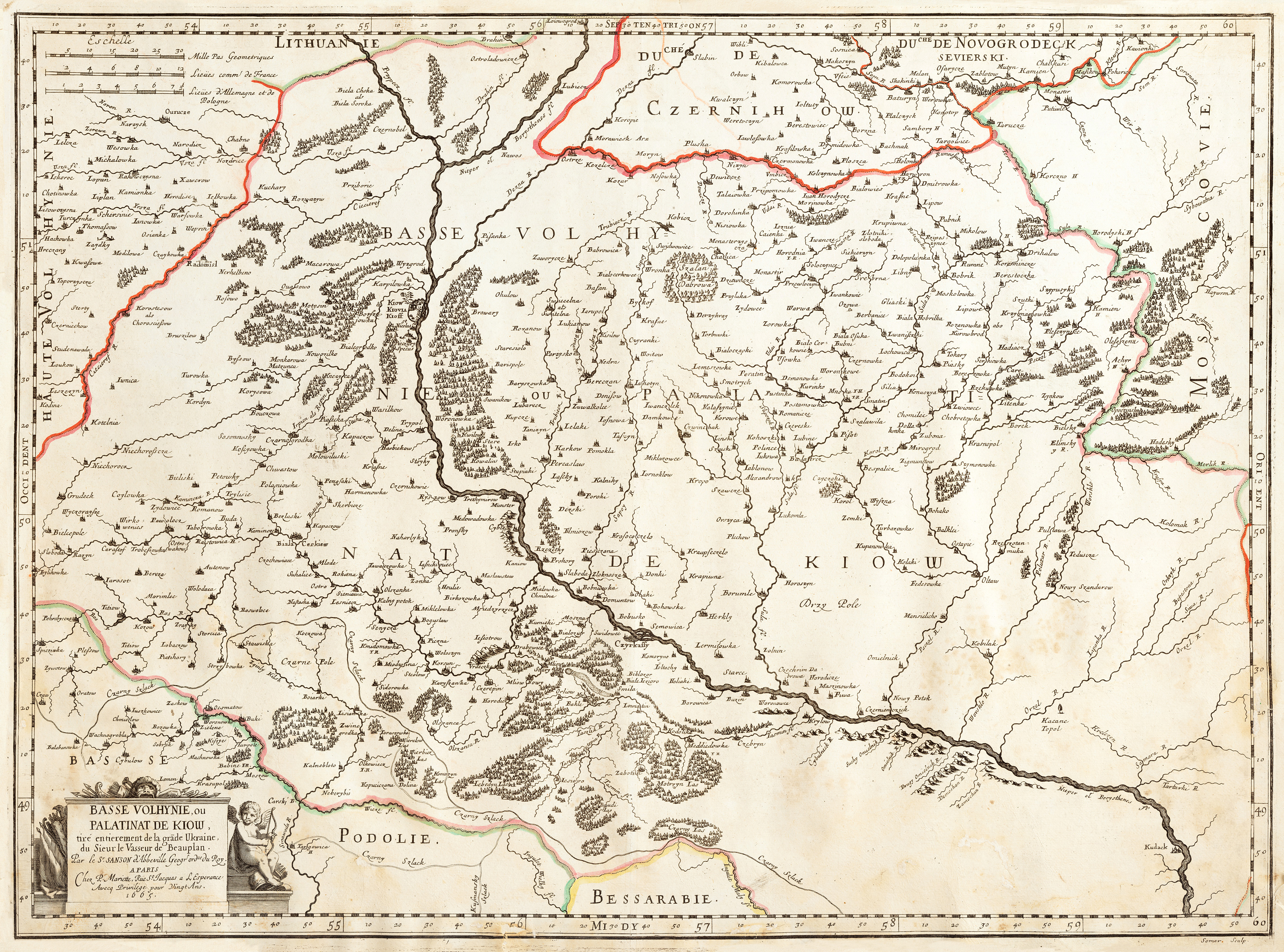
Basse Volhynia (Lower Volhynia) or Kiow Palatinate in 1665

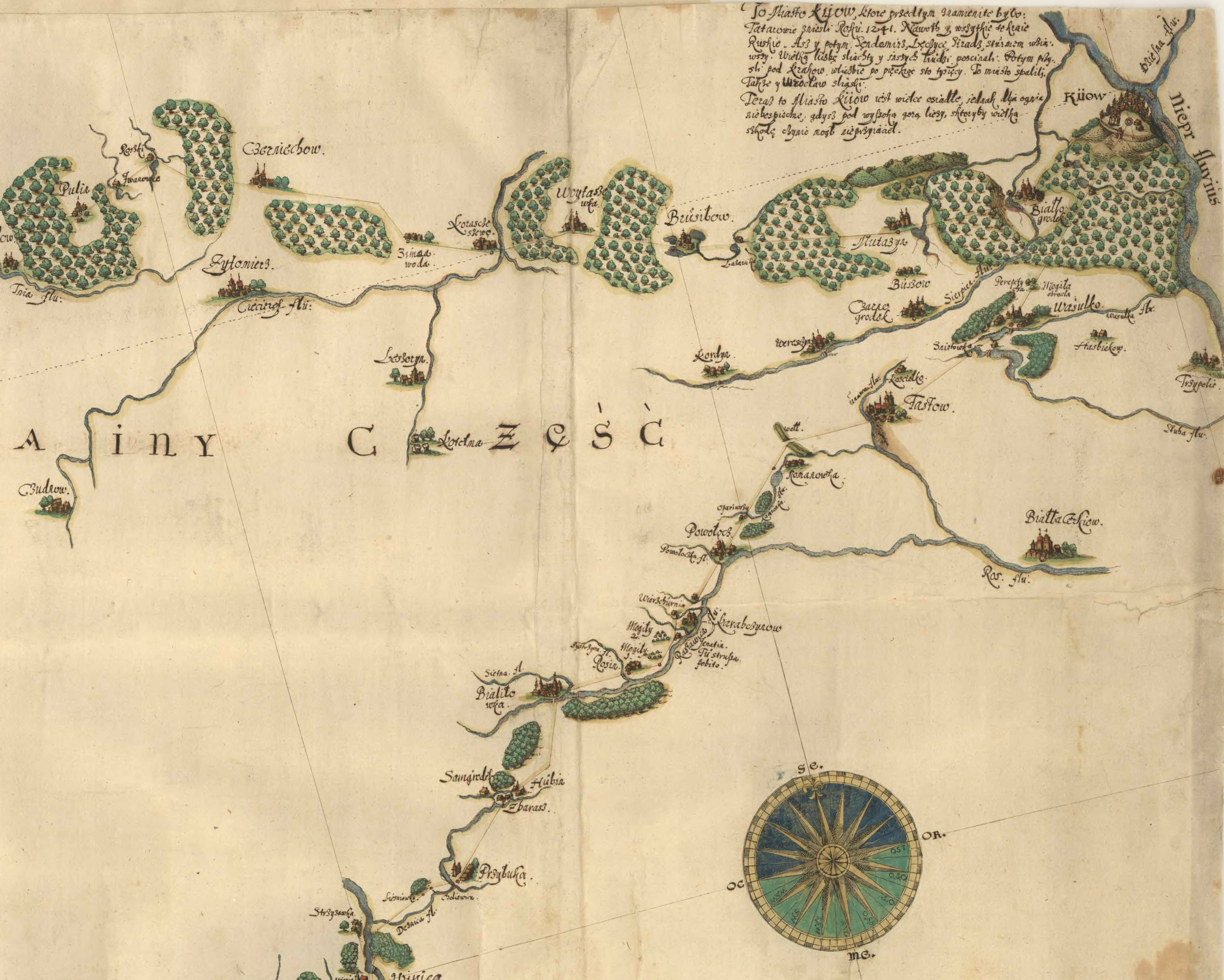
Map from 1635 covering the western part of the Kiev Voivodeship.

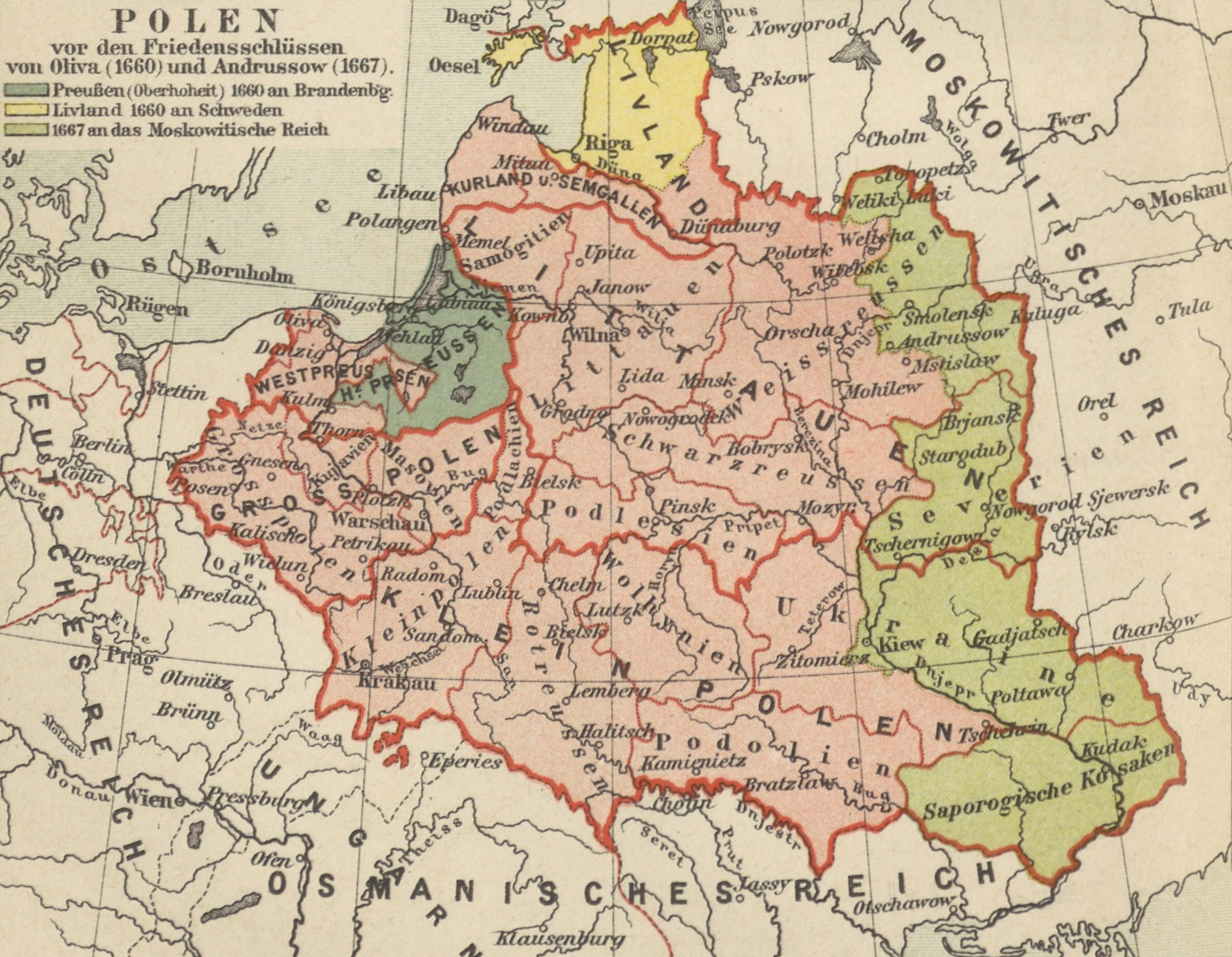
Map of the Polish–Lithuanian Commonwealth and its territorial losses in the mid 17th century.

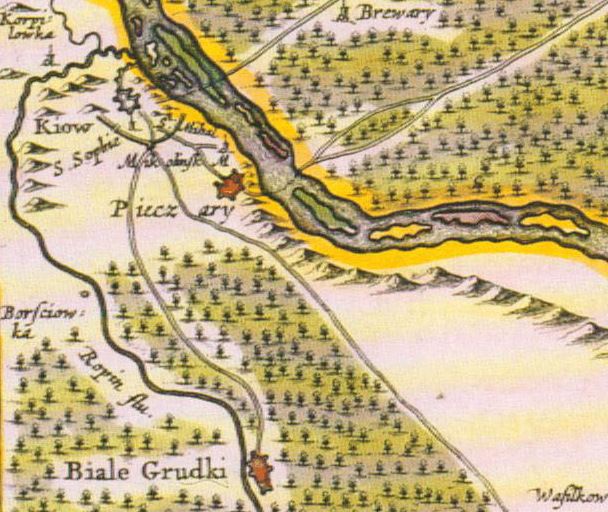
Kiev (Kiow) on a fragment of piece Tractus Borysthenis Vulgo Dniepr at Niepr dicti. Map by Jan Janssonius (Amsterdam, 1663).

The Kiev Voivodeship or Kyiv Voivodeship (Polish: Województwo kijowskie; Latin: Palatinatus Kioviensis; Ukrainian: Київське воєводство, romanized: Kyivske voievodstvo) was a unit of administrative division and local government in the Grand Duchy of Lithuania from 1471 until 1569 and of the Crown of the Kingdom of Poland from 1569 until 1793, as part of Lesser Poland Province of the Polish Crown. On some maps Kiev Voivodeship was also named as the Lower Volhynia.

The voivodeship was established in 1471 upon the death of the last prince of Kiev Simeon Olelkovich and transformation of the Duchy of Kiev (appanage duchy of the Grand Duchy of Lithuania) into the Voivodeship of Kiev.

== Description ==
The voivodeship was established in 1471 under the order of King Casimir IV Jagiellon soon after the death of Semen Olelkovich. It had replaced the former Principality of Kiev, ruled by Lithuanian-Ruthenian Olelkovich princes (related to House of Algirdas and Olshansky family).

Its first administrative center was Kiev, but when the city was given to Tsardom of Russia in 1667 by Treaty of Andrusovo, the capital moved to Zhytomyr (Polish: Żytomierz), where it remained until 1793.

It was the biggest voivodeship of the Polish–Lithuanian Commonwealth by land area, covering, among others, the land of Zaporizhian Cossacks.

== Municipal government ==
The governor of the voivodeship was voivode (List of voivodes of Kiev). In the Polish–Lithuanian Commonwealth the other two major administrative positions were castellan and bishop (biskup kijowski).

- List of voivodes of Kiev
- Castellan of Kijow (city governor)
- Vogt of Kijow

== Flag and coat of arms ==
The flag on one side had the Coat of arms of Lithuania on red field and on other side black bear on white field with his front left paw raised up.

== Regional council (sejmik) ==
- Zhytomyr

=== Regional council (Polish: sejmik generalny) for all Ruthenian lands ===
- Sudova Vyshnia

=== Regional council (Polish: sejmik poselski i deputacki) seats ===
- Kive
- Ovruch
- Zhytomyr

== Administrative division ==
=== Counties ===
- Kijow County, Kijow (Biała Cerkiew, Bila Tserkva, since 1659)
- Owrucz County, Owrucz
- Żytomierz County, Żytomierz

==== Other former counties ====
- Putywl County, Putywl (lost after the second Muscovite–Lithuanian War)
- Mozyrz County, Mozyrz (transferred to Minsk Voivodeship under the Union of Lublin)
- Czerkasy County, Czerkasy (liquidated in 1566)
- Czarnobyl County, Czarnobyl (liquidated in 1566)

==== Former counties lost under the Treaty of Andrusovo ====
- Lubecz County, Lubecz
- Oster County, Oster
- City of Kijow

=== Elderships (Starostwo) ===
Instead of some liquidated counties in 1566 there were established elderships: Biała Cerkiew, Kaniów, Korsun, Romanówka, Czerkasy, Czigrin.

==== Free royal cities ====
- Berezań
- Biała Cerkiew
- Bohusław
- Czehryń
- Czerkasy
- Jagodzin
- Kaniów
- Kijów
- Korsuń
- Myrhorod
- Oster
- Owrucz
- Stebliw
- Trechtymirów
- Żytomierz

== Neighbouring Voivodeships and regions ==
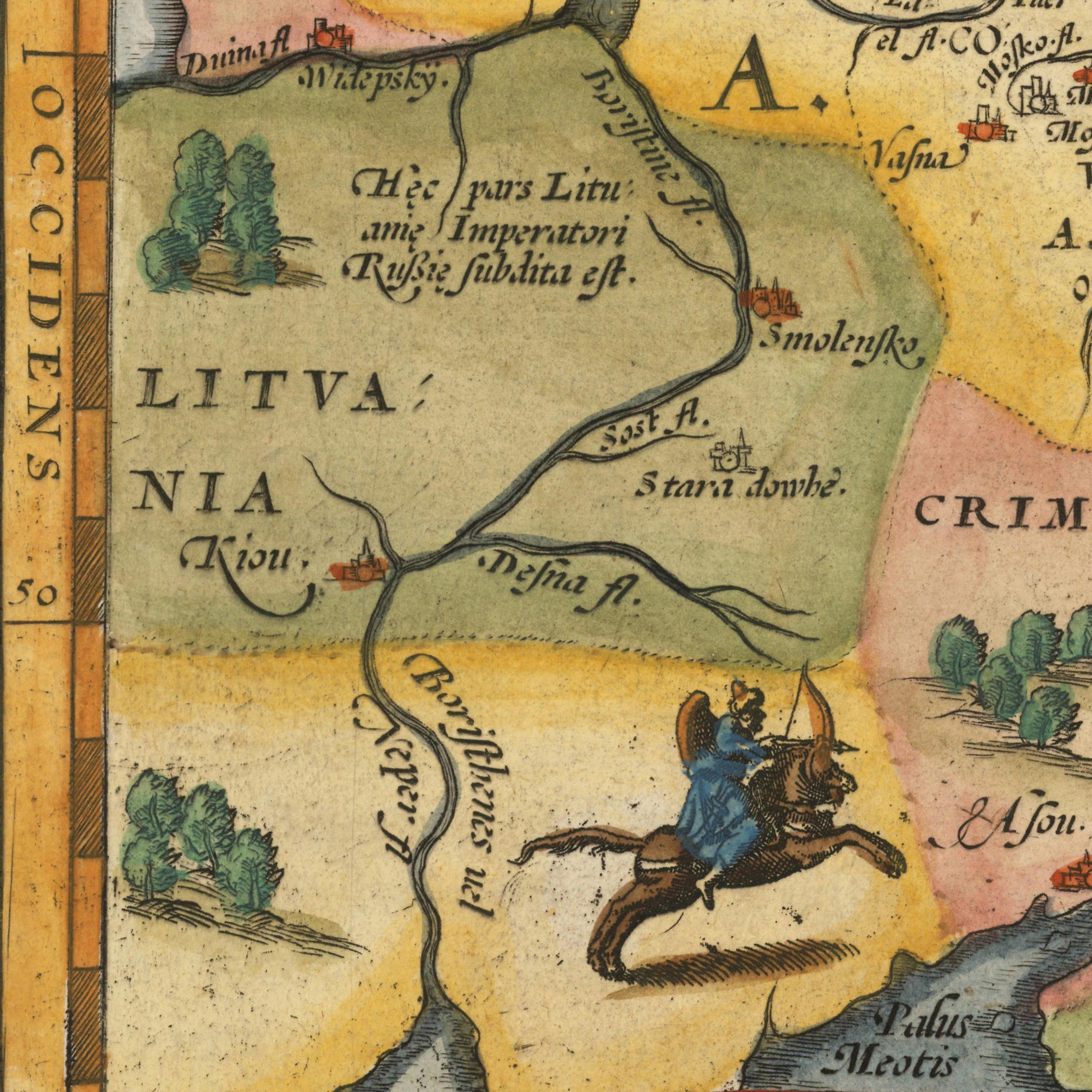
Kiev (Kiou). A fragment of Russiae, Moscoviae et Tartariae map by Anthony Jenkinson (London 1562) published by Ortelius in 1570.

- Bratslav Voivodeship
- Podolian Voivodeship
- Brest Litovsk Voivodeship
- Minsk Voivodeship
- Chernihiv Voivodeship
- Grand Duchy of Moscow
- Crimean Khanate
- Yedisan

== See also ==
- List of voivodes of Kiev

== Sources ==
- Kijow Voivodeship, description by Zygmunt Gloger
