= Principality of Kiev =

Medieval East Slavic state

- 1132–1471
- Left: Coin issued by Prince Vladimir Olgerdovich of Kiev (1388–1392); Right: Coin of unknown prince with Saint Michael motif, the common figure of various Kievan coins

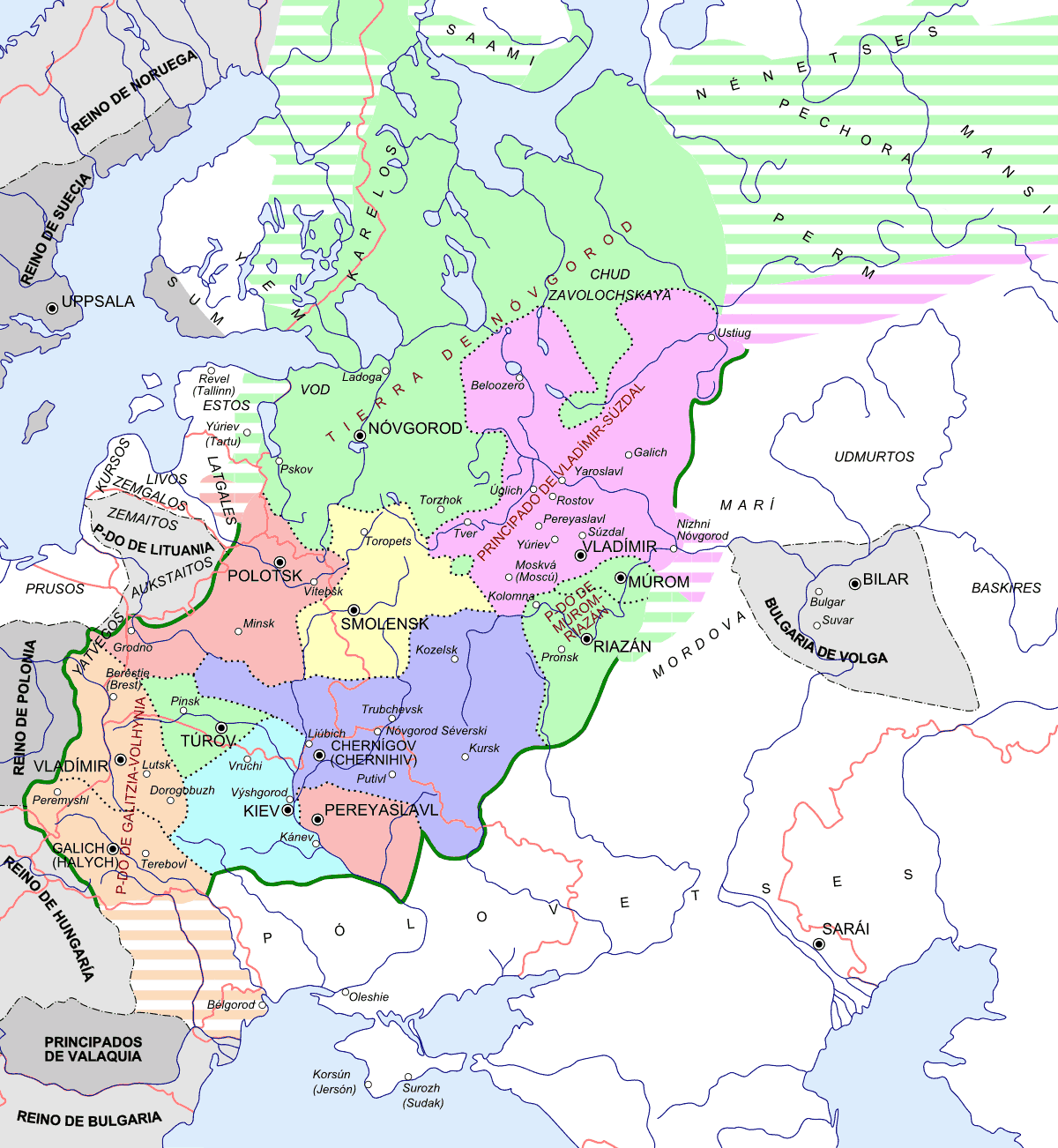
- Principality of Kiev (light blue) in 1237
- Status: Principality within Kievan Rus' (1132–1240); Vassal of the Golden Horde (1243–1271); Part of the Kingdom of Galicia–Volhynia (1271–1301); Vassal of the Golden Horde (1301–1362); Part of the Grand Duchy of Lithuania (1362–1471)
- Capital: Kiev
- Religion: Eastern Orthodox
- Government: Monarchy
- Grand Prince
  - 1132–1139: Yaropolk II Vladimirovich
  - 1454–1471: Simeon Olelkovich
- History
  - Established: 1132
  - Destruction of Kiev by Batu Khan: 1240
  - Death of Simeon Olelkovich: 1471
Preceded by	Succeeded by
Kievan Rus'	Kiev Voivodeship (Lithuania)
- Today part of: Ukraine; Belarus (partially)

The inner Principality of Kiev (Note: Ukrainian: Київське князівство, romanized: Kyivske kniazivstvo; Russian: Киевское княжество, romanized: Kiyevskoye kniazhestvo.) was a medieval principality centered on the city of Kiev.

The principality was formed during the process of political fragmentation of the Kievan Rus' in the early 12th century. As a result of that process, the effective rule of the grand princes of Kiev was gradually reduced to central regions of Kievan Rus' around its capital city Kiev, thus forming a reduced princely domain, known as the inner Principality of Kiev. It existed as a polity until the middle of the 14th century, when it was annexed by the Grand Duchy of Lithuania.

== History ==
=== Kievan Rus' period ===
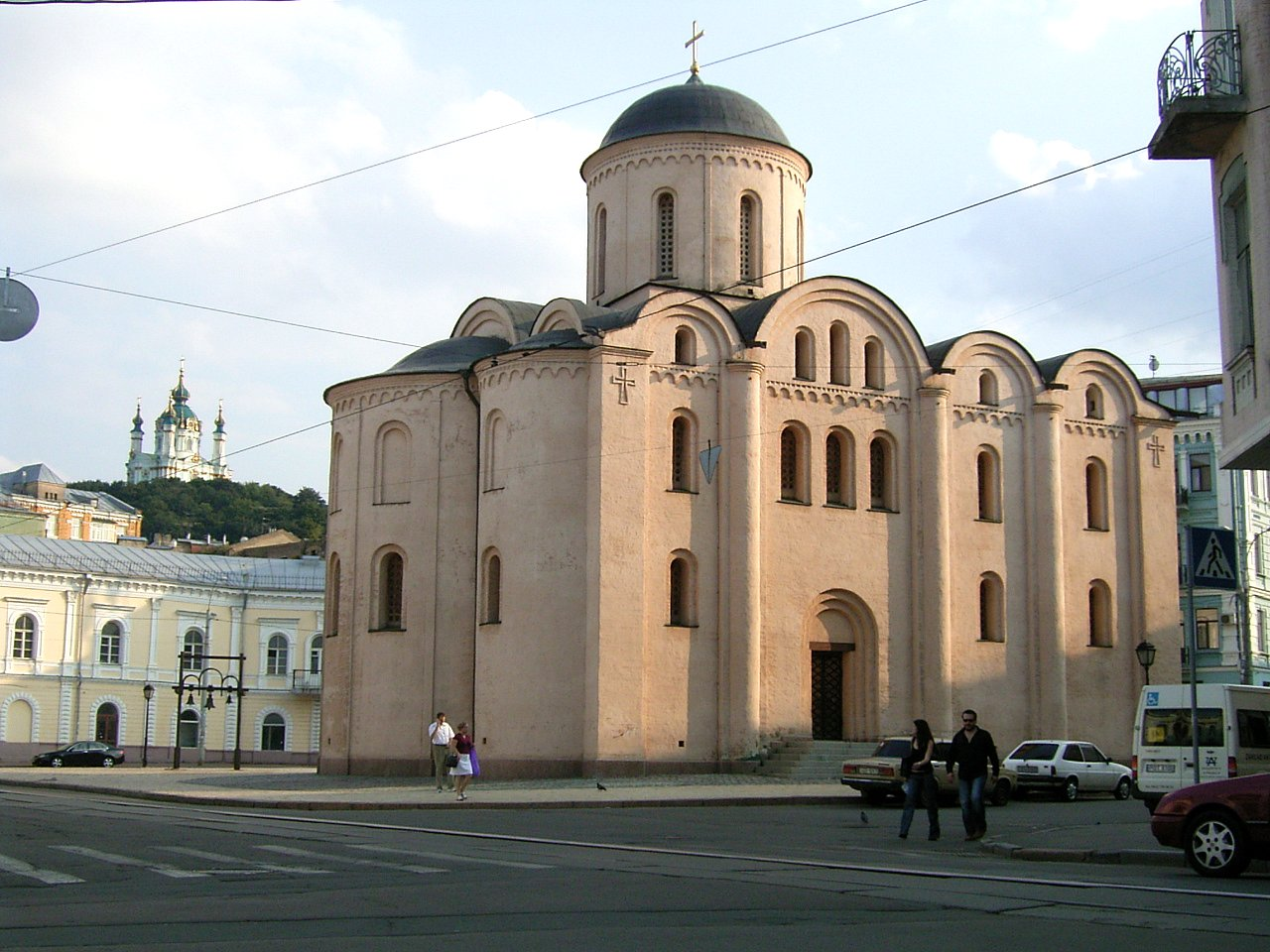
Reconstructed Orthodox church in Kiev

During the era of Kievan Rus', the princely clan was assumed to maintain the unity of the state under the reign of their senior who held the grand princely throne of Kiev; however, the state disintegrated due to rivalry between the clans.

The region of the Kievan Rus' fragmented in the early 12th century and several semi-autonomous successor states arose. Kiev remained the core of the country and was the centre of spiritual life with the office of the Metropolitan of the Eastern Orthodox Church in Kiev.

Following the death of Mstislav I of Kiev in 1132, the semi-autonomous states were de facto independent and so led to the emergence of the Principality of Kiev as a separate state.

The importance of the Kievan Principality began to decline. In the years 1150–1180 many of its cities such as Vyshhorod, Kaniv, and Belgorod sought independence as individual principalities. The emergence of the principalities of Vladimir-Suzdal and Galicia-Volhynia resulted in the transition of the political and cultural centre of Rus' as well as the migration of citizens to cities like Vladimir and Halych.

=== Golden Horde and Lithuanian periods ===
The Mongol invasion of Kievan Rus' left the Principality of Kiev in a severely ruined state. Following the invasion, it was now under the formal suzerainty of the Grand Prince of Vladimir-Suzdal, Alexander Nevsky, who in turn was a vassal to the Mongols. After the Battle of Irpen in 1321, Kiev was the object of desire for the Lithuanian Grand Duke Gediminas, and it was incorporated into the Grand Duchy of Lithuania in 1362. The Principality formally existed as a distinct entity until 1471, when it was converted into the Kiev Voivodeship.

== Geography ==
The inner Principality of Kiev occupied land areas on both banks of the Dnieper River, bordering the Principality of Polotsk to the north-west, the Principality of Chernigov to the north-east, Poland to the west, the Principality of Galicia to the south-west and Cumania to the south-east. Later, Kiev would be bordered by the separated Principality of Turov-Pinsk to the north and the joined Kingdom of Galicia–Volhynia to the west.

== List of princes ==
=== Grand princes ===
- Yaropolk II Vladimirovich (1132—1139)
- Viacheslav Vladimirovich (1139)
- Vsevolod II Olgovich (1139—1146)
- Igor II Olgovich (1146)
- Iziaslav II Mstislavich (1146—1149)
- Yuri Dolgorukiy (1149—1151)
- Viacheslav Vladimirovich & Iziaslav II Mstislavich (Joint Rule) (1151–1154)
- Rostislav Mstislavich (1154)
- Izyaslav III Davidovich (1154—1155)
- Yuri Dolgorukiy (Second Term) (1155—1157)
- Izyaslav III Davidovich (Second Term) (1157–1158)
- Rostislav Mstislavich (Second Term) (1159–1162)
- Izyaslav III Davidovich (Third Term) (1162)
- Rostislav Mstislavich (Third Term) (1162–1167)
- Vladimir III Mstislavich (1167)
- Mstislav II Izyaslavich (1167–1169)
- Gleb Yuryevich (1169)
- Mstislav II Izyaslavich (Second Term) (1169–1170)
- Gleb Yuryevich (Second Term) (1170–1171)
- Vladimir III Mstislavich (1171)
- Roman Rostislavich (1171—1173)
- Vsevolod III Yuryevich (1173)
- Rurik Rostislavich (1173)
- Sviatoslav III Vsevolodovich of Kiev (1174)
- Yaroslav II Iziaslavich (1174–1175)
- Roman Rostislavich (Second Term) (1175–1177)
- Sviatoslav Vsevolodovich of Vladimir (1177–1180)
- Rurik Rostislavich (Second Term) (1180–1181)
- Sviatoslav Vsevolodovich of Vladimir (1181–1194)
- Rurik Rostislavich (Third Term) (1194–1201)
- Ingvar Yaroslavich (1201—1203)
- Rurik Rostislavich (Fourth Term) (1203)
- Rostyslav Rurykovych (1203–1205)
- Rurik Rostislavich (Fifth Term) (1206)
- Vsevolod IV Svyatoslavich (1206—1207)
- Rurik Rostislavich (Sixth Term) (1207–1210)
- Vsevolod IV Svyatoslavich (Second Term) (1210–1214)
- Ingvar Yaroslavich (Second Term) (1214)
- Mstislav Romanovich (1214–1223)
- Vladimir IV Rurikovich (1223–1235)
- Iziaslav IV Vladimirovich (1235–1236)
- Yaroslav II of Vladimir (1236–1238)
- Mikhail Vsevolodovich (1238—1239)
- Rostislav Mstislavich of Smolensk (1240–1241)
- Mikhail Vsevolodovich (Second Term) (1241–1243)

=== After the Mongol invasion ===
Principality did not have its own ruler and was ruled by viceroys (voivodes).

- Yaroslav II of Vladimir (Second Term) (1243–1246)
- Alexander Nevsky (1246—1263)
- Yaroslav III Yaroslavich (???-???)

=== Olgovichi ===
The principality was ruled by princes of Olshanski and Olgovichi.

- Vladimir Ivanovich (???–1300-???)
- Stanislav Terence (???–1324)
- Fyodor (1324–1362)

=== Grand Duchy of Lithuania ===
The principality was ruled by princes of Olshanski and Olelkovichi.

- Vladimir Olgerdovich (1362—1395) *Start of Lithuanian Rule*
- Skirgaila (1395–1397)
- Ivan Olshansky (1397–1399)
- ??? (???–???)
- Olelko Vladimirovich (1443—1454)
- Simeon Olelkovich (1454—1471) *Principality became Kiev Voivodeship*

== Bibliography ==
- Christian, David. A History of Russia, Mongolia and Central Asia. Blackwell, 1999.
- Fennell, John, The Crisis of Medieval Russia, 1200–1304. (Longman History of Russia, general editor Harold Shukman.) Longman, London, 1983. ISBN 0-582-48150-3
- Martin, Janet, Medieval Russia 980–1584. Cambridge University Press, Cambridge, 1993. ISBN 0-521-36832-4
- Magocsi, Paul R. (2010). A History of Ukraine: The Land and Its Peoples. Toronto: University of Toronto Press. ISBN 978-1442610217.
- Obolensky, Dimitri (1974) [1971]. The Byzantine Commonwealth: Eastern Europe, 500–1453. London: Cardinal. ISBN 9780351176449.
