= Janusz Radziwiłł (1579–1620) =

Polish–Lithuanian magnate

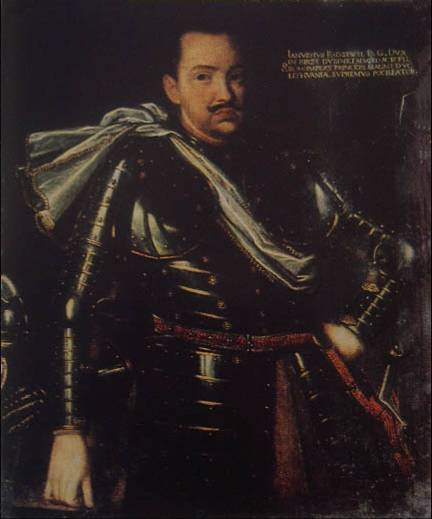
- Portrait of Janusz Radziwiłł
- Born: 2 July 1579; Vilnius, Grand Duchy of Lithuania
- Died: 3 December 1620 (aged 41); Czarlin, Polish–Lithuanian Commonwealth
- Spouse(s): Zofia Olelkowicz Słucka; Elisabeth Sofie von Brandenburg
- Children: with Elisabeth Sophia of Brandenburg: Elżbieta Eleonora Radziwiłł; Jan Jerzy Radziwiłł; Zofia Agnieszka Radziwiłł; Bogusław Radziwiłł
- Parent(s): Krzysztof Mikołaj "Perkūnas" Radziwiłł; Katarzyna Ostrogska

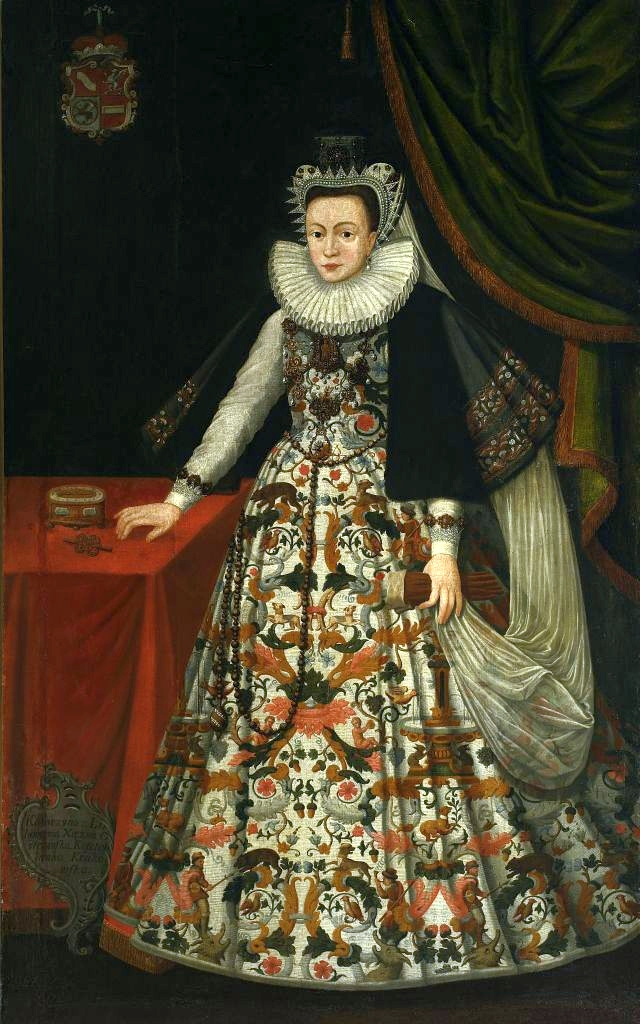
Mother

Janusz Radziwiłł (Lithuanian: Jonušas Radvila; 2 July 1579 – 3 December 1620) was a Polish–Lithuanian magnate. He was the Lithuanian deputy cup-bearer since 1599, the castellan of Vilnius since 1619, and the starost of Borysów. Radziwiłł also held the title of Reichsfürst (Imperial Prince) of the Holy Roman Empire.

He married Zofia of Słuck on 1 October 1600. She died in 1612, and was canonized by the Belarusian Orthodox Church as saint Sofia of Slutsk thanks to her charity and miracles on the grave. Zofia's large estate (seven castles and palaces and some thirty-two villages) contributed to the already significant Radziwłł's wealth. His second marriage was to Elisabeth Sophia of Brandenburg, daughter of John George, Elector of Brandenburg, on 27 March 1613 in Berlin.

It was during Radziwiłł's life that the interests between his family and the Polish Crown began to drift apart, as the Radziwiłłs sought to increase their wealth and power, safeguard Protestantism and support ethnically Lithuanian culture.

In 1606 he joined the opposition against King Sigismund III Vasa and became one of the leaders of the Zebrzydowski rebellion. This Confederation, an armed and legal rebellion, was aimed at weakening the king.

Trąby coat of arms, used by the Radziwiłł family. In the Holy Roman Empire, the Trąby coat of arms was situated in the center of a black eagle in a golden shield.

Janusz Radziwiłł is one of the characters on the painting by Jan Matejko: Sermon of Piotr Skarga.
