= Vladimir Olgerdovich =

Prince of Kiev from 1362 to 1394

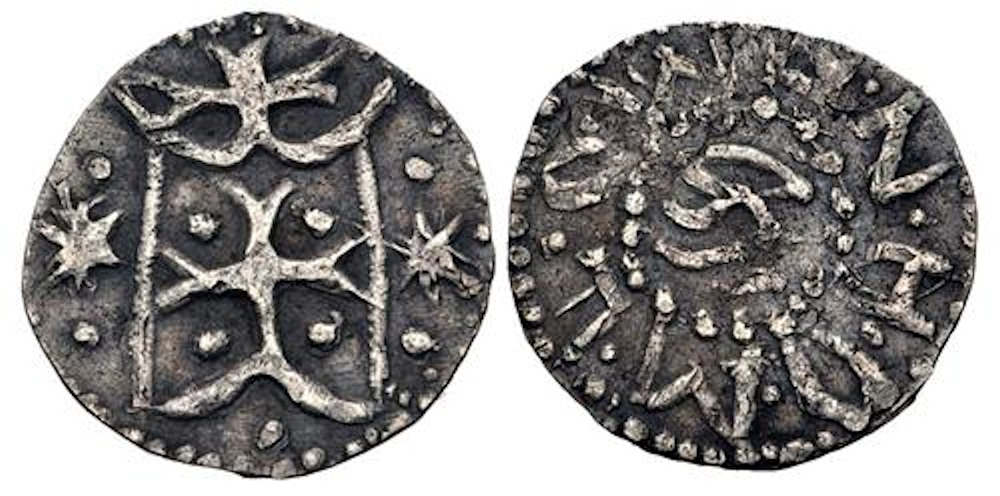
Vladimir Olgerdovich. 1362-1394. Kiev mint. Military standard, swallowtail banner decorated with cross and pellets set on curved arm surmounted by cross, Cyrillic legend

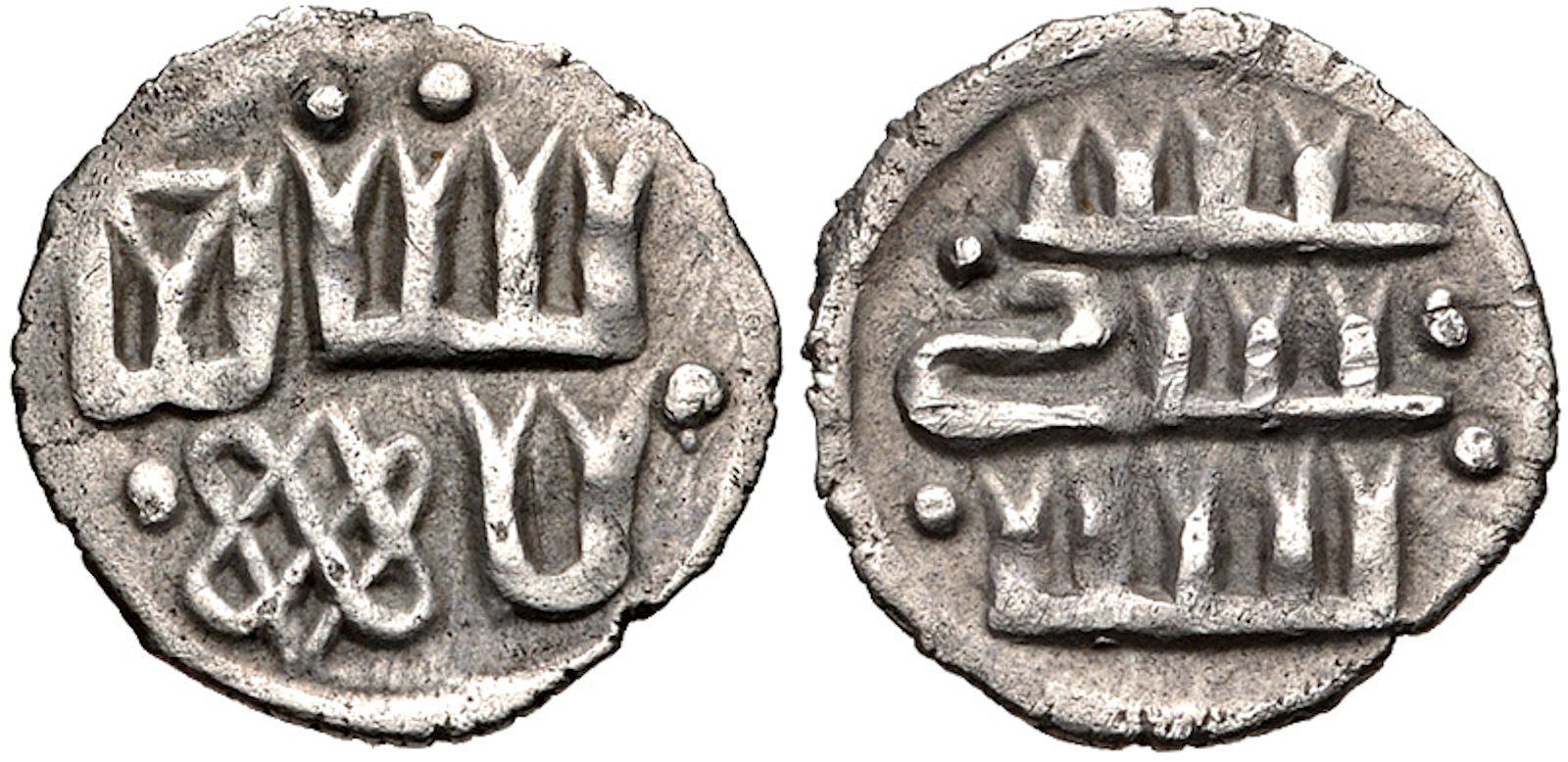
Coin of the Principality of Kiev, around the time of Vladimir Olgerdovich (1362-1394), imitating a Gulistan mint dang of Golden Horde ruler Jani Beg (Jambek). Uncertain Kiev region mint. Pseudo-Arabic legend.

Vladimir Olgerdovich (Note: Belarusian: Уладзімір Альгердавіч; Lithuanian: Vladimiras Algirdaitis; Polish: Włodzimierz Olgierdowic; Ukrainian: Володимир Ольгердович; Russian: Владимир Ольгердович) (died after 1398) was the son of Algirdas, Grand Duke of Lithuania and his first wife, Maria of Vitebsk. He was the Prince of Kiev from 1362 to 1394. His sons Ivan and Alexander started the Belsky and Olelkovich families.

== Prince of Kiev ==
After the Battle of Blue Waters in 1362, the Principality of Kiev was attached to the Grand Duchy of Lithuania. It is believed that Vladimir was installed in Kiev right after the battle and replaced Fiodor of Kiev. Vladimir conducted independent politics and minted his own coins. Initially the coins were heavily influenced by the numismatic traditions of the Golden Horde and copied symbolism from coins minted by Khans Jani Beg and Muhammad Bolak. However, later the coins replaced the Tatar symbols (i.e. tamga) with letter K (for Kiev) and a cross (for Eastern Orthodox faith). This could indicate that for a while the Principality still had to pay tribute to the Horde. These were the first coins minted in the territory of the Grand Duchy of Lithuania.

In late 1384, Vladimir's troops detained Dionysius, the a metropolitan bishop, who died in captivity a year later. This was part of the power struggle between Dionysius, Pimen, and Cyprian for the title of Metropolitan of Kiev and all Rus' (which at that time had residence in Moscow).

== Removal from Kiev ==
When Jogaila became King of Poland in 1386, Vladimir swore loyalty to him. After the 1392 Ostrów Agreement, Vytautas became the Grand Duke of Lithuania and began to eliminate regional dukes replacing them with appointed regents. This campaign could have been launched to discipline disloyal dukes, but turned into a systematic effort to centralize the state. In 1393, Vytautas confiscated Volodymyr-Volynskyi from Feodor, son of Liubartas, Novhorod-Siverskyi from Kaributas, Vitebsk from Švitrigaila. In 1394, Vytautas and Skirgaila marched against Vladimir, who surrendered without a battle. Skirgaila was installed in Kiev while Vladimir received the Principality of Slutsk.

Vladimir, last mentioned in written sources in October 1398, was the 4th great-grandfather of Elizabeth Báthory.

== Death ==
Vladimir Olgerdovich died after 1398 and was buried at the Kiev Pechersk Lavra.
