= Kapyl =

Town in Minsk Region, Belarus

Kapyl Капыль (Belarusian) Копыль (Russian) Kopyl
- Town
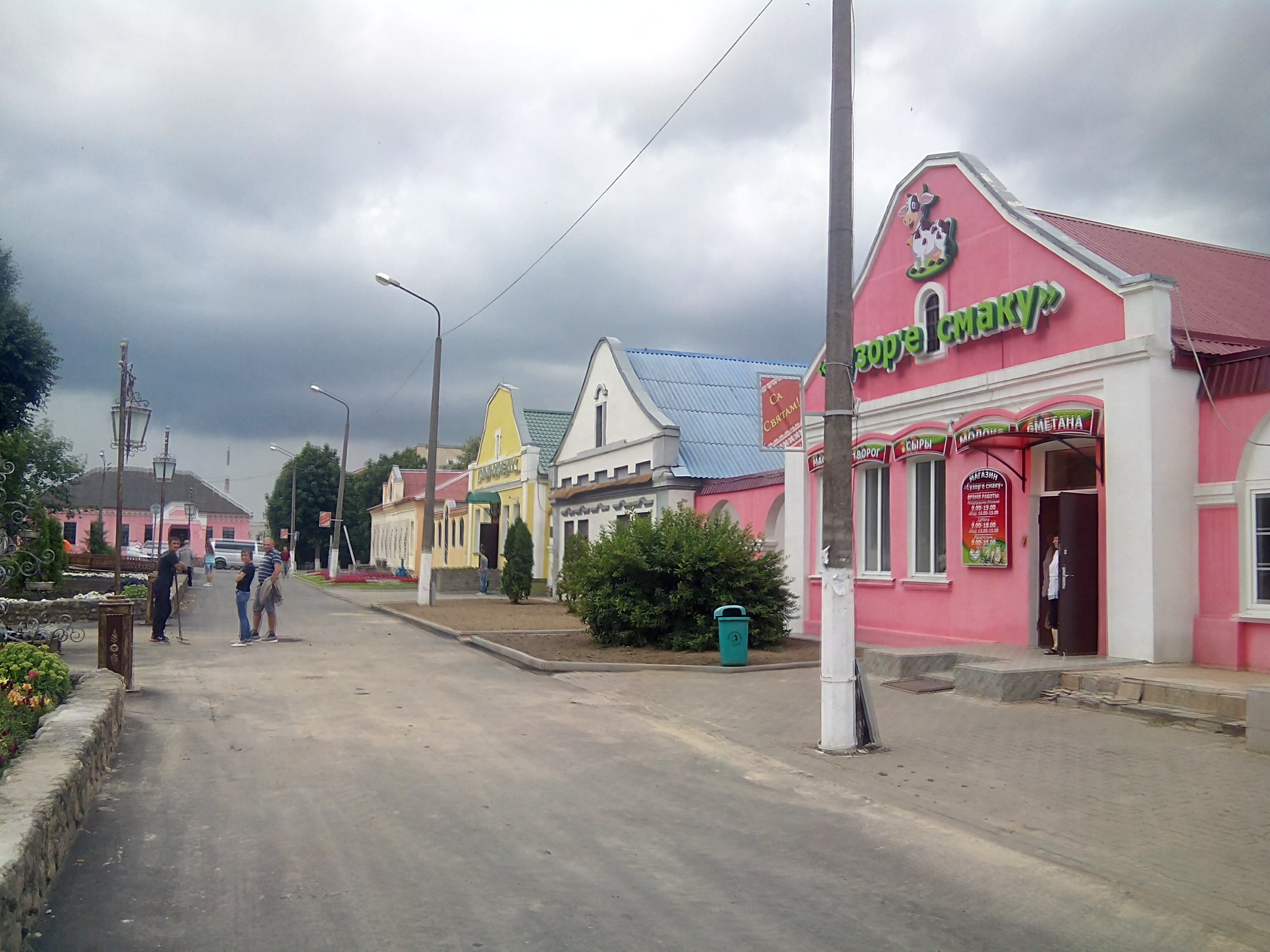

- Flag Coat of arms

- Location in Belarus
- Coordinates: 53°09′0″N 27°05′30″E
- Country: Belarus
- Region: Minsk Region
- District: Kapyl District
- First mentioned: 1274
- Town rights: 1652

Population (2026)
  - Total: 9,767
- Time zone: UTC+3 (MSK)
- Postal code: 223 910, 223 927
- Area code: +375 1719
- License plate: 5

Kapyl (Note: Belarusian: Капыль, romanized: Kapyĺ; Russian: Копыль, romanized: Kopyl; Polish: Kopyl; Lithuanian: Kapylius; Yiddish: קאפּוליע.) is a town in Minsk Region, Belarus. It serves as the administrative center of Kapyl District. It is located 34 kilometers (21 mi) west-northwest of Slutsk and 90 kilometers (56 mi) south-southwest of the capital Minsk. As of 2026, it has a population of 9,767.

== History ==
Kapyl, first mentioned in 1274, was a walled town that was noteworthy by the 14th century, and is listed in the atlas of Ortelius of 1574. During the 14th century the town was part of the Grand Duchy of Lithuania. In 1395 it came into the possession of Prince Vladimir Olgerdovich and his heirs, the Olelkovich family, where it remained until 1612. Kapyl was part of the dowry of Zofia Olelkowicz Słucka and was one of the seven fortified towns left to her husband Janusz Radziwill upon her death in 1612. Kapyl was attacked by the Tatars numerous times and was sacked on at least one occasion during the 16th century.

On August 27, 1652, King King John II Casimir Vasa granted Kapyl Magdeburg rights and its own seal, a coat of arms depicting a hunting horn on a gold field. John II Casimir also established local markets and annual horse and cattle fair. During the 16th century weaving became established in the town, including the production of velvet. Six guilds came into existence as a result of the growth of the weaving industry. The town rights were confirmed in 1658, 1665 and 1706.

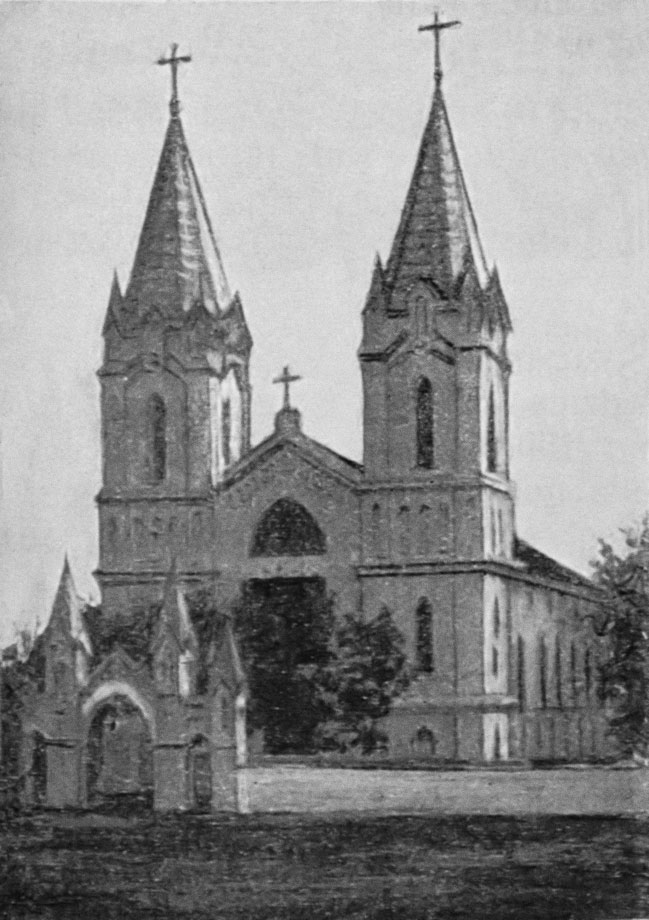
Former Catholic Church of Saints Peter and Paul

After the Second Partition of Poland in 1793 Kapyl became part of the Russian Empire. From 1832 it became a personal holding of Prince Wittgenstein. During the 19th century local businesses included a brewery, 2 water mills, and 6 shops. Other local institutions included 3 schools, churches (including a Calvinist church), and 2 Jewish synagogues.

Towards the end of the 19th century Kapyl had over 350 houses and over 2000 inhabitants. At that time a majority of the town's population was Jewish. By 1900 the Jewish population was 2,671.

In 1924, Kapyl became the capital city of the Kapyl District.

During World War II the Slutsk-Kapyl area was the subject of a German military operation code-named Erntefest II (Harvest Festival) which ended in February 1943. Although ostensibly aimed at suppressing the activities of Soviet partisans in the area the operation resulted in the deaths of 2,325 of the local inhabitants (against the loss of six German soldiers), which can only be characterized as a campaign of genocide and terror.

One of Kapyl district's major architectural monuments is a 19th-century church in the town itself.

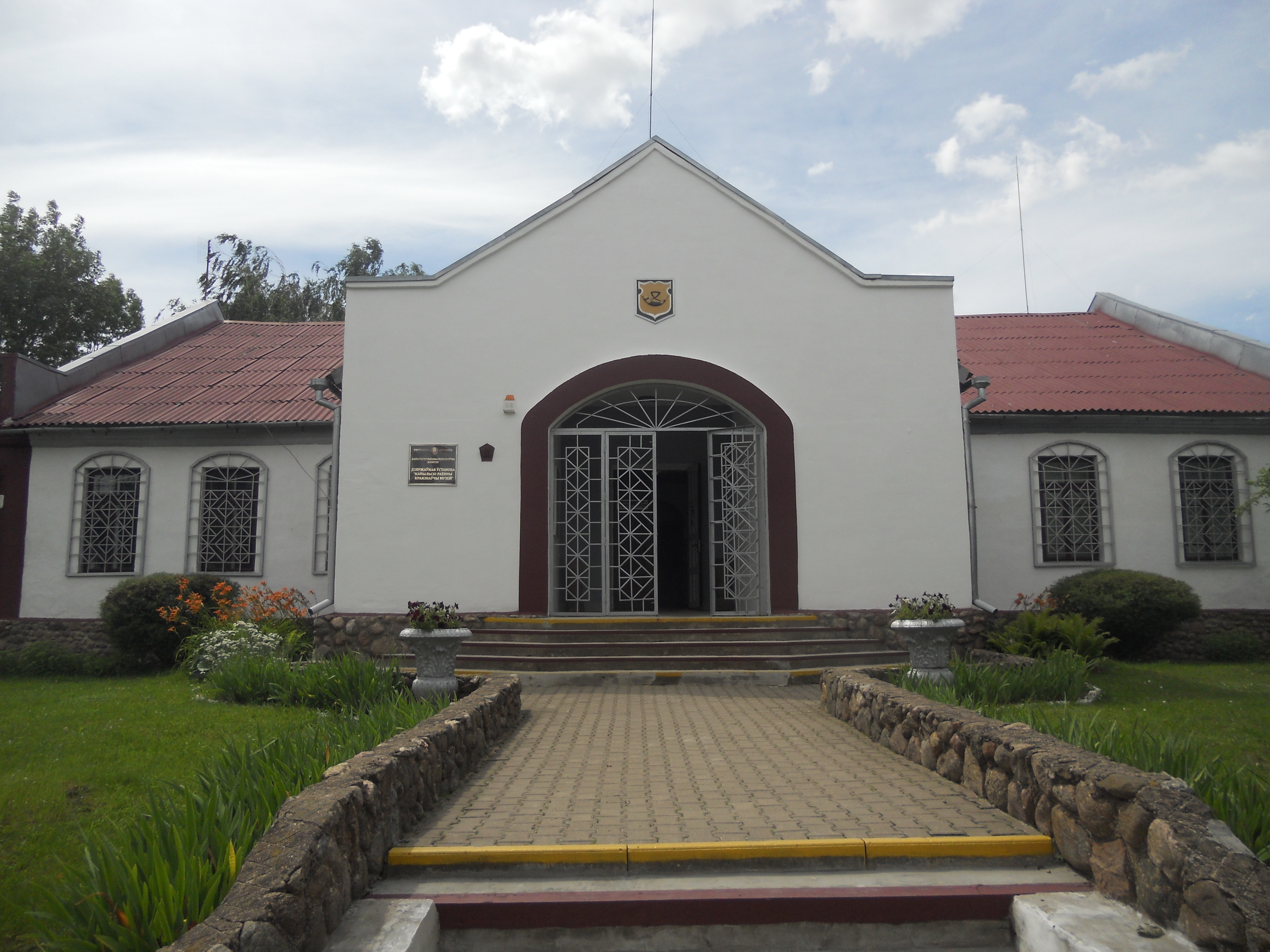
Local museum

== Notable people ==
- Abraham Jacob Paperna, educator and author
- Mendele Mocher Sforim, author
- Renald Knysh, gymnastics coach
- Zmicier Zhylunovich, writer and political leader

== Sister cities ==
- Joniškis, Lithuania

== See also ==
- List of towns with German town law
