= Battle of Shelon =

1471 battle between Moscow and Novgorod

Coordinates: 58°12′N 30°46′E

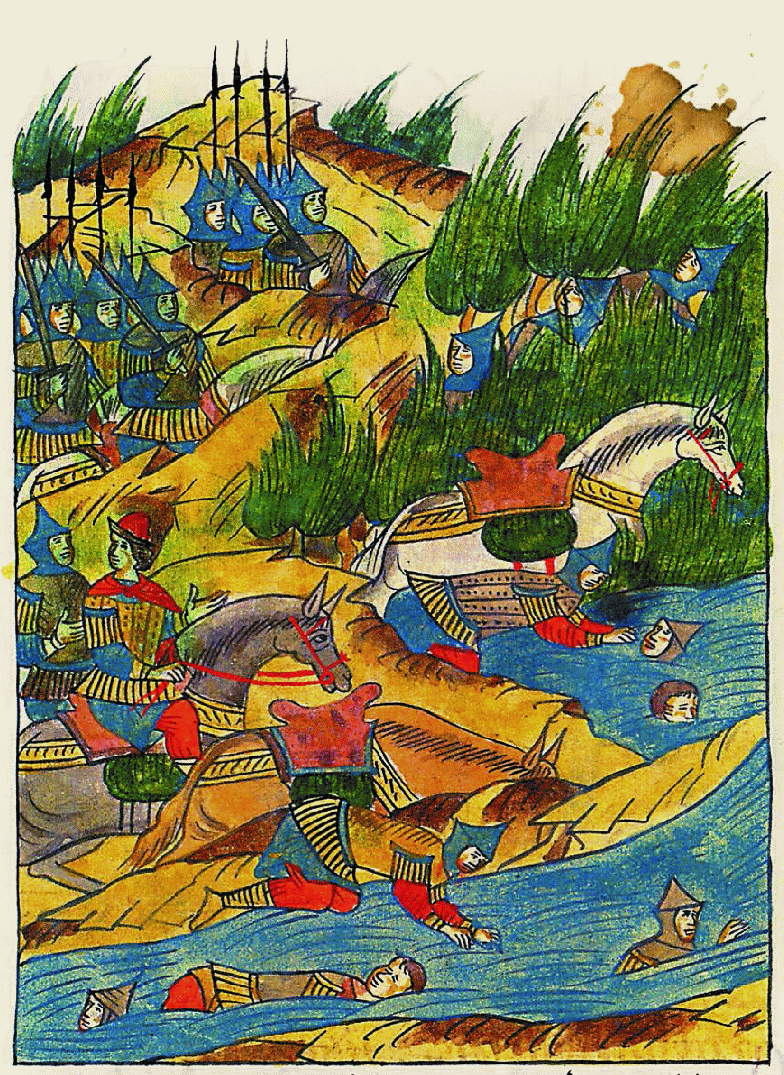
- They rode for a long time; even their horses had grown weary, and they began throwing themselves from their horses into the water. Miniature from the Illustrated Chronicle of Ivan the Terrible, 16th century.
Date	14 July 1471
Location	Shelon River, Russia
Result	Muscovite victory

Belligerents
Novgorod	Moscow

Commanders and leaders
Dmitry Boretsky (executed); Vasily Kazimer (POW)	Daniil Kholmsky

Strength
10,000+	4,000–5,000

The Battle of Shelon (Russian: Шелонская битва, romanized: Shelonskaya bitva) was a decisive battle between the forces of the Grand Principality of Moscow under Ivan III (r. 1462–1505) and the Novgorod Republic, which took place on the Shelon River on 14 July 1471.

Although Novgorod traditionally recognized the authority of the Russian grand princes, relations between Moscow and Novgorod deteriorated in the 15th century over issues relating to autonomy. The pro-Lithuanian faction in Novgorod also grew stronger during this period. Following Novgorod's invitation of the Lithuanian prince Mikhailo Olelkovich, Ivan III accused Novgorod of betraying the Orthodox faith and violating the Treaty of Yazhelbitsy, signed in 1456.

Novgorod suffered a major defeat and the city became subordinate to Moscow, although its autonomy and republican institutions remained intact. Novgorod was then formally annexed by Moscow in 1478. The incorporation of Novgorod marked an important step in Moscow's process of establishing dominance over the Russian lands.

== Background ==
Although the Novgorod Republic traditionally recognized the authority of the Russian grand princes, the Grand Duchy of Lithuania extended its influence in Novgorod in the early 15th century under Vytautas, who resorted to diplomacy and the threat of war instead of direct military confrontation. Relations between Novgorod and Lithuania improved under Casimir IV Jagiellon, during whose reign several Lithuanian princes were sent for kormleniye ('feeding'). Grand Duke Casimir IV and Grand Prince Vasily II of Moscow signed treaties in 1449 that delineated their spheres of influence, with Casimir recognizing the republics of Pskov and Novgorod as dependencies of the Grand Principality of Moscow.

During the Muscovite Civil War, the Novgorodian authorities sympathized with Dmitry Shemyaka. After Vasily II regained the throne in 1450, Dmitry fled to Novgorod and occupied the traditional residence of the prince of Novgorod in Gorodishche. Dmitry relied on support from Novgorod and was able to capture Ustyug. However, he soon died in 1453 after being poisoned. Vasily II accused the Novgorodian nobles of treason, and in 1456, his forces defeated the Novgorodian army, leading to the signing of the Treaty of Yazhelbitsy, which required Novgorod to make concessions. In particular, Novgorod was no longer allowed to conduct an independent foreign policy.

The pro-Lithuanian faction in Novgorod grew stronger and increasingly sought Lithuanian support, leading to the invitation of the Lithuanian prince Mikhailo Olelkovich in 1470. Mikhailo arrived in November but left four months later, apparently due to the death of his brother. Although the deputies of Grand Prince Ivan III continued to exercise authority, negotiations for an alliance began and a treaty was drafted on behalf of Novgorod. The treaty was likely not approved by Casimir IV; however, a mutual aid agreement cannot be ruled out. According to the treaty, Novgorod recognized the suzerainty of the grand duke of Lithuania, although his authority was limited. One of the conditions was "not to deprive us of our Greek Orthodox faith". In addition, the grand duke's deputy had to convert to Orthodoxy and it was forbidden to erect Catholic churches.

Despite this, Novgorod was accused of apostasy. The invitation of a Lithuanian prince and the attempt to form an alliance with Lithuania were also viewed as violations of the 1456 peace treaty with Moscow. Ivan III and the Russian metropolitan accused the Novgorodians not only of political treachery, but of attempting to abandon Eastern Orthodoxy and convert to Catholicism. Following the death of Jonah, the archbishop of Novgorod, in November 1470, the pro-Lithuanian faction sought to send the new archbishop for ordination under Metropolitan Gregory, recognized by the patriarch of Constantinople and the pope, instead of Metropolitan Philip I, head of the Russian Orthodox Church in Moscow, which declared itself de facto autocephalous in 1448. In response, Ivan III sent his ambassadors to Novgorod, declaring Novgorod to be his patrimony since the reign of Rurik. In addition, the Russian Church intervened on behalf of Ivan III, with Philip I denouncing the move, but this only exacerbated tensions.

On 23 May 1471, Ivan III went to war with Novgorod. He was joined by Pskov and the Principality of Tver. Meanwhile, Vyatka conducted a raid on Sarai, the capital of the Great Horde, whose ruler Ahmed Khan bin Küchük was absent. The khan, who likely negotiated with Casimir IV in regard to Novgorod, could only respond in 1472. The Moscow chronicle compilation of 1479 states that Ivan III went to war against them "not as Christians, but as foreign pagans and apostates from Orthodoxy," as "his great-grandfather, his faithful Dmitry Ivanovich, [went] against the godless Mamai and his godless Tatar army". According to the historian Hélène Carrère d'Encausse, the war "had features of a crusade".

== Battle ==
The battle took place on the morning of 14 July on the left bank of the Shelon River, which flows into Lake Ilmen southwest of Novgorod. The Novgorodian army numbered at least 10,000 and was led by Dmitry Boretsky and Vasily Kazimer. The Muscovite army was led by Daniil Kholmsky and numbered 4,000–5,000 men. The Muscovite troops crossed the river and its right tributary, the Dryan. A surprise attack by a detachment of Tatars from Kasimov led the Novgorodians to retreat, and the pursuit continued to the Mshaga River. Historians have paid special attention to the organization of the Novgorodian army, which was composed largely of citizens without military experience; it is believed to have been based on militias of the five kontsy ('ends') of Novgorod.

The Novgorodian Fourth Chronicle reports that Feofil, the archbishop-elect of Novgorod, ordered his cavalry to not attack the Muscovite forces, but only the forces of Pskov, thus limiting its room to maneuver. As a result, the chronicler places disorder and lack of communication within the army as the main reason for the defeat. In addition, the pro-Moscow faction in Novgorod became active, with the Chronicle stating that a "great deal of talk" began in Novgorod: "some people wished to follow the Prince, others wished to follow the King of Lithuania." The "best people", referring primarily to the boyars, were accused of "having brought the Grand Prince to Novgorod".

According to the Moscow chronicle compilation of 1479, more than 12,000 Novgorodians were killed. However, this figure is considered to be an exaggeration. The source also places the size of the Novgorodian army at 40,000, and although there is uncertainty over this figure, it is likely that the Novgorodians enjoyed numerical superiority over the grand prince's forces. An additional 1,700–2,000 were taken prisoner. The number of losses on the Muscovite side is unknown.

== Aftermath ==
Novgorod signed the Treaty of Korostyn, which required it to recognize itself as a patrimony of the grand prince. It also gave up attempts to "surrender" itself to Lithuania and was prohibited from inviting Lithuanian princes. In addition, Novgorod recognized the exclusive right of the Russian metropolitan to appoint its archbishop, and thus the independence of Novgorod was severely restricted, although it retained its autonomy and republican government.

On 24 July, Ivan III executed the Novgorodian commander, Dmitry Boretsky, a member of the Boretsky clan, which, led by Marfa Boretskaya, had championed the city's opposition to Moscow. In the longer term, the defeat at Shelon severely weakened Novgorod. According to some sources, Ivan III confiscated significant amounts of land from the archiepiscopal administration and several of the largest monasteries immediately after the battle, although most sources date these confiscations to 1478. These measures weakened the independence of the Novgorodian archbishopric. He also returned to the city several times in the 1470s and arrested important boyars or entire boyar clans. However, he only took direct control of the city-state in January 1478 after further strained relations with Archbishop Feofil and the Novgorodian boyars led him to send his armies against the city in the winter of 1477–1478. The incorporation of Novgorod marked an important step in Moscow's process of establishing dominance over the Russian lands.

== Sources ==
- Crummey, Robert O. (6 June 2014) [1987]. The Formation of Muscovy 1300–1613. Routledge. ISBN 978-1-317-87200-9.
- Galeotti, Mark (5 November 2024). Forged in War: A Military History of Russia from Its Beginnings to Today. Bloomsbury USA. ISBN 978-1-4728-6251-8.
- Kuchkin, V. A. (1 September 2022). "The First Campaign of Ivan III to Novgorod in 1471". Herald of the Russian Academy of Sciences. 92 (5): S355–S366. doi:10.1134/S1019331622110089. ISSN 1555-6492.
- Lukin, P. V.; Polekhov, S. V. (1 September 2022). "Why Did Lord Novgorod the Great Fall? The Novgorod Republic and Its Neighbors in 1470–1471". Herald of the Russian Academy of Sciences. 92 (5): S367–S384. doi:10.1134/S1019331622110090. ISSN 1555-6492.
- Nesin, M. A. (2017). "Шелонская битва 1471". In Kravets, S. L. (ed.). Большая российская энциклопедия. Том 34: Хвойка — Шервинский (in Russian). Большая российская энциклопедия. pp. 790–791. ISBN 978-5-85270-372-9. Archived from the original on 26 May 2026.
- Paul, Michael C. (March 2007). "Secular Power and the Archbishops of Novgorod before the Muscovite Conquest". Kritika: Explorations in Russian and Eurasian History. 8 (2): 231–270. doi:10.1353/kri.2007.0020.
- Powell, John (2001). "Novgorod, Muscovite Conquest of". Magill's Guide to Military History. Vol. 3. Salem Press. p. 1140. ISBN 978-0-89356-017-1.
- Shaikhutdinov, Marat (2021). Between East and West: The Formation of the Moscow State. Academic Studies Press. doi:10.2307/j.ctv249sgn2. ISBN 978-1-64469-713-9.
