= List of Horizon in the Middle of Nowhere episodes =

An anime television series based on the light novel Horizon in the Middle of Nowhere was announced in the March 2011 issue of Dengeki Bunko Magazine. Produced by Sunrise, the anime series debuted in Japan on October 1, 2011. The series has been licensed by Sentai Filmworks in North America and was simulcasted through the Anime Network on October 4, 2011, followed by a home video release in 2012. Sentai has also licensed the second season for streaming and home video release in 2013. The opening theme song for the first season is "TERMINATED" by Minori Chihara. The first ending theme used is "Pieces -Side Ariadust-" by AiRI and the second ending theme used is "Stardust Melodia -Side Horizon-" by Ceui. For the second season, the opening theme is "ZONE//ALONE" by Minori Chihara. The first ending theme is "Kanashimi wa Dare no Negai Demonai -Side Sunset-" (悲しみは誰の願いデモナイ -Side Sunset-) by Aira Yūki and the second ending theme is "Sora no Uta -Side Sunrise-" (空の詩 -Side Sunrise-) by Masami Okui.

== Episode list ==
=== Season 1 ===
| No. | Title | Original release date |
|---|---|---|
| 1 | "Those Lined Up Before the Horizon"; Transliteration: "Kyōkai-sen Mae no Seiretsu-sha-tachi" (Japanese: 境界線前の整列者達) | October 1, 2011 |
It is the year 1648 of the Testament Era. Aboard the Far East's massive ship Musashi, the students of the Musashi Ariadust Academy are challenged by their homeroom teacher Makiko Oriotorai to land a hit on her before she reaches her office across town. Despite all of their advanced skills and unique efforts, none of them succeed. At the end of the race, the class president Tori Aoi, one with a raunchy personality, arrives to reveal that he will propose his love to his childhood friend Horizon Ariadust, which confuses his classmates as she had officially died ten years before.
| 2 | "Innocents at the Table"; Transliteration: "Shokujiba no Seijun-sha" (Japanese: 食事場の清純者) | October 8, 2011 |
The students learn about Far East's history during class. This is the same day that Masazumi Honda will enter the academy. At her mother's tombstone, Masazumi has an encounter with an android known as P-01s. She explains to P-01s that she underwent a partial sex change surgery in order to inherit her family name. As the Musashi docks at the city of Mikawa, Tori keeps discussing with his classmates about the proper way to confess his feelings to Horizon. However, this gets out of hand when he wants to be able to grope her breasts when meeting her.
| 3 | "Commandos In Town"; Transliteration: "Machinaka no Yūgeki-shu" (Japanese: 街中の遊撃手) | October 15, 2011 |
Much of the students make preparations for a party by Tori's request. Masazumi is assigned to room with Miriam Poqou, a disabled academy student. Kimi Aoi watches over her brother Tori, who seems to be frightened by Horizon's place of death. Margot Naito, who is talking with Malga Naruze, gives Masazumi a packaged video game to deliver it to Tori. In the woods, Masazumi hears from her father about the tragedy that befell Horizon and the remorse that impacted Tori ten years past. Meanwhile, the Musashi is approached by ships from K.P.A. Italia and Trés España, two of the Harmonic Divine States with unknown intentions. The students stay at the academy overnight to exorcise any spirits within the area.
| 4 | "Covert Ops Under the Night Sky"; Transliteration: "Yaten-ka no An'yaku-sha" (Japanese: 夜天下の暗躍者) | October 22, 2011 |
Tadatsugu Sakai, the Musashi Ariadust Academy President, is introduced to Futayo Honda, colonel of the Mikawa Guard, offering her to attend his academy soon. During the time when the students stay at the academy overnight, Sakai finds out that Yasumasa Sakaibara is found dead inside his house. With all of its inhabitants evacuated, Tadakatsu Honda and Lord Montonobu Matsudaira have started a meltdown to destroy the city of Mikawa, code-named the Genesis Project. This prompts the forces of Trés España to attack them in response. Nonetheless, Kazuno, Tadakatsu's android maid, takes out the forces unaided.
| 5 | "Graduates Under the Moon"; Transliteration: "Gekka no Sotsugyō-sha" (Japanese: 月下の卒業者) | October 29, 2011 |
Muneshige Tachibana of Trés España confronts Tadakatsu with his Mortal Sin Armament, the Lypē Katathlipsē. As the earth pulse reactor heightens, Monotobu reveals that he put Horizon's soul into an android body called P-01s, which has the ninth Deadly Sin Armament, Ólos Phthonos, containing envy. Muneshige fails to prevent the city of Mikawa from being obliterated when he is stabbed in the chest by Tadakatsu's weapon, the Slicing Dragonfly. In the end, only Monotobu and Tadakatsu perish in the explosion. Meanwhile, the forces of K.P.A. Italia board the Musashi and capture P-01s, confirmed to be Horizon herself.
| 6 | "Advocate at the Confession Grounds"; Transliteration: "Kokuhaku-ba no Daiben-shu" (Japanese: 告白場の代弁手) | November 5, 2011 |
Gin Tachibana previously retrieved Muneshige after he was stabbed in the chest, bringing him to the hospital to be treated. Pope Innocentius of K.P.A. Italia, the Testament Union president, declares that Horizon is to be executed for illegal possession of one of the Mortal Sin Armaments and to take responsibility for the destruction of Mikawa. Heidi Augesvarer discusses with the other students of Musashi what course of action they must take in regard to it, concluding that they must first ally with Masazumi. Muneshige and Gin gives Futayo her father's Slicing Dragonfly as proof of his death. Tomo Asama reads aloud an essay written by Suzu Mukai, who talks about how she first met Tori and Horizon on the day of the welcome ceremony and how they helped her climb the staircase due to her blindness. After hearing this story himself, this gives Tori the motivation to devise a plan to save Horizon.
| 7 | "Musashi's Knight"; Transliteration: "Musashi no Kishi" (Japanese: 武蔵の騎士) | November 12, 2011 |
After deciding to rescue Horizon by their own efforts, the students are confronted by Masazumi, who opposes the idea, along with her classmates Nate Argenté Loup Mitotsudaira and Naomasa. Both sides agree to solve the matter in a series of three one-on-one matches. In the first match, Naomasa is defeated by the council accountant Shirojiro Bertoni, who overcomes her God of War with his money-related abilities. The second match pits Mitotsudaira against her friend Suzu, and she accidentally wins when Suzu trips and falls into her arms. The final match, a debate between Tori and Masazumi, has a surprising outcome when he manages to turn the rules of the discussion against her.
| 8 | "Ruler of the Land"; Transliteration: "Zen'iki no Shiji-sha" (Japanese: 全域の支持者) | November 19, 2011 |
With no way to continue the debate according to the established rules, Tori and his friends try to convince Masazumi to join their cause, claiming that they can take the opportunity not only to rescue Horizon, but to obtain independence from the Harmonic States. Tired of just watching the situation, Innocentius tells Masazumi that must reach a peaceful agreement first. She plans to gather all finances into one management and issue a shrine protest for an informal reevaluation of the situation. However, the pope puts her in a situation to choose between admitting defeat or waging war. After Tori has given his full support to Masazumi, she officially declares independence. Soon after, Innocentius order his aide Galileo to attack the students, using his Mortal Sin Armament, Stithos Porneia. Fortunately, Futayo intervenes at the last second.
| 9 | "The Summit's Flower"; Transliteration: "Takane no Hana" (Japanese: 高嶺の花) | November 26, 2011 |
Yoshinao, the king of Musashi, arrives on the scene and orders Innocentius to stop interfering, thus the pope orders Galileo to retreat. With the debate between Tori and Masazumi considered a draw, the decision to take arms and rescue Horizon is finally settled in a final match between Futayo and Kimi. Being an expert in erotic dancing, Kimi has Futayo confused from her attacks. Tomo explains that after Horizon died ten years ago, Kimi snapped Tori out of depression by beating him up until he cried out his remaining tears. Kimi slaps Futayo for not understanding the importance of saving Horizon. With Kimi winning the debate, Yoshinao promises that he will appoint Horizon and Tori as viceroys. However, Innocentius still plans to extract the Moral Sin Armaments out of Horizon after she is executed. As Oriotorai declares the Musashi as the victor of the debate, the students set off to rescue Horizon.
| 10 | "The Trumpeter at the Start Line"; Transliteration: "Sutātorain no Rappafuki" (Japanese: スタートラインのラッパ吹き) | December 3, 2011 |
Toussaint Neshinbara will be in charge of the battle strategy of attack for the Musashi. Behind the gate is the combined forces of K.P.A. Italia on the ground and Trés España in the sky. Adéle Balfette operates an armored God of War capable of withstanding missiles shot from the K.P.A. Italia. Persona uses her as a shield to advance the Musashi closer to their destination. Tomo fires a powerful bow and arrow to take out one of the Trés España airships. Margot and Malga use their enhanced witch powers to take out an airborne God of War. Margot is soon blasted by the God of War, but, as she regains consciousness, she destroys it in one blow.
| 11 | "Musashi's Mr. Impossible"; Transliteration: "Musashi no Fukanō Otoko" (Japanese: 武蔵の不可能男) | December 10, 2011 |
As it seems that the K.P.A. Italia soldiers have the Musashi warriors cornered, Mitotsudaira and Naomasa join in the battle against the enemies. Innocentius gains the upper hand when he activates the Stithos Porneia, disabling all his opponents' weapons and rendering them useless. Tori comes with a way for Tomo to harness a portion of the Musashi's energy supply and make use of it to power up his companions and start a counterattack. Masazumi challenges Innocentius to a duel, which in turn cancels the power of the Stithos Porneia, but he later realizes her bluff and orders his men to fight once more. Noriki faces off against Galileo. Nevertheless, Galileo's theory-themed abilities are no match against Noriki's fist punches. Futayo encounters Muneshige in the forest, and they engage in a fierce battle, only for her to be defeated by his speed attacks.
| 12 | "Opposition Against Crossing Over the Parallel Lines"; Transliteration: "Heikōsen-jō eno Aitai-sha" (Japanese: 平行線上への相対者) | December 17, 2011 |
Muneshige gains the opportunity to end the conflict when he is about to take down the Musashi with a direct shot, but Futayo, rises up again, managing to defeat him for good and confiscating Lypē Katathlipsē, causing the Trés España forces to fall back. Meanwhile, Tori manages to reach Horizon at a holographic barrier, but she claims that he should not risk the future of the Far East just for her sake, and the two has a long discussion about it. Even though he confesses his love for her, Horizon concludes that she is inversely parallel to Tori, stating that she has perfect judgment of thought rather than of emotion, but he convinces her that she is a human being. He later accidentally passes his hand through the barrier and touches her, and the two enter into the memory leading up to her childhood death. As they both begin to disintegrate, they reach out their hands in agreement of affection, breaking free from the barrier and making it out alive.
| 13 | "Those Lined Up Above the Horizon"; Transliteration: "Kyōkaisen-jō no Seiretsu-sha-tachi" (Japanese: 境界線上の整列者達) | December 24, 2011 |
Horizon is officially being enrolled in Musashi Ariadust Academy. Mitotsudaira launches Nenji from the supply ship and transforms into a hand to grab Tori and Horizon back onto the ship. However, Innocentius plays one last card to defeat them, having a warship attack one of the academy's supply ship. Horizon, alongside Tori, takes possession of Lypē Katathlipsē and make use of its full power to stop the warship, forcing the pope to retreat. Horizon has regained her state of mind, aware that her emotions are within her. Afterwards, the students celebrate their victory on their ship at night. The next morning, the Trés España airships make an attempted assault on the Musashi, yet all the students manage to fend them off.

=== Season 2 ===
| No. | Title | Original release date |
|---|---|---|
| 1 | "Members of the Vermilion Grounds"; Transliteration: "Ake no Ba no Buin-tachi" (Japanese: 朱の場の部員達) | July 7, 2012 |
As the students of Musashi continue to fend off the Tres España forces, it is revealed that Gin Tachibana is responsible for leading the Tres España forces to attack the Musashi, all to avenge her husband's defeat. To escape the vicious attack of the Tres España forces, the Musashi sets course to the territorial waters of England. However, as the English have a neutral position in the conflict between the Far East and the Testament Union, the England forces are sent to fight the Musashi to prevent them from reaching port.
| 2 | "Herald on the Stage"; Transliteration: "Butai-jō no Senkoku-sha" (Japanese: 舞台上の宣告者) | July 14, 2012 |
Toussaint Neshinbara confronts Thomas Shakespeare using playwright abilities, but Shakespeare defends herself using his Mortal Sins Armament, Aspida Phylargis, putting a curse on Toussaint, which emits a greenish light from his hand. Toussaint orders to have the Musashi orbiting around England and crashing onto the shore, looking for an excuse to let the England provide them asylum. As Tenzo Crossunite saves some civilians from being crushed by one of Musashi's supply ships, he comes across a strange cloaked figure whom he also protects from harm. At an orphanage, Gin speaks with Juana about her trust with Felipe Segundo, who she claims to have lost his reason to life. Later that night, Segundo, walking inside a room, spills a box of letters while Juana is asleep, and Gin mistakes him to be caressing Juana when he grabs some letters that were attached to her. Segundo reads a letter written by a young girl whom he once saved her life during a war long ago, and it is hinted that it was written by Juana.
| 3 | "Those Descending to the Surface"; Transliteration: "Do Jō no Kudari-mono" (Japanese: 土上の下り者) | July 21, 2012 |
On his way to clean the cemetery, Tenzo chances upon the stranger he once met before. Segundo tells Gin that Muneshige Tachibana has been stripped of his title because of Juana. As Tenzo provides aid to the stranger by gathering swords to be piled, the stranger trips and falls, tearing the cloak, accidentally discovered to be Scarred, a beautiful woman with several scars around her body. Having successfully taken refuge on England, Shirojiro Bertoni, accompanied by Heidi Augesvarer, engages in negotiations with English treasurer Charles Howard looking for a way for the deal to not be seen as an act of treason by the Testament Union. Shirojiro suggests to prepare and hold a meat festival, and Howard gives in to agree to thirteen days. Suzu Mukai and Adéle Balfette are respectively requested to be the diplomat and bodyguard to represent the Far East.
| 4 | "Ruler of the Theatre"; Transliteration: "Gekijou no Shihaisha" (Japanese: 劇場の支配者) | July 28, 2012 |
With the initial negotiations with England finished, the students of Musashi have a barbecue party. Tenzo attends the festivities accompanied by Scarred, but concealing her identity from the others. Tenzo and Scarred go to the hot spring alone together, though Tenzo is hesitant to join her. Meanwhile, Tori Aoi and Horizon Ariadust resume their discussion about his motives to stand against the Testament Union and why he is so determined to gather the other Mortal Sin Armaments and have her reclaim her lost emotions. Scarred realizes that if she has used her spell on the cargo ship, it would have reflected back to the civilians. As the festival organized by the students of the Far East and England begins, Thomas returns and challenges Toussaint to another match.
| 5 | "The Hunting Ground's Humanitarians"; Transliteration: "Ryouba no Jindoushugisha" (Japanese: 猟場の人道主義者) | August 4, 2012 |
Some members of Oxford Academy challenge some students of Musashi Academy in a series of hidden duels as part of the queen's plan to put them under her mercy. Oblivious to the events surrounding them, Tori and Horizon enjoy the festival together while Mary shows Tenzo around the capital. Both Kiyonari Ulquiaga and Margot Naito manage to defeat and break through the dimensional barriers respectively set by Nicholas Bacon and John Hawkins. However, when Malga Naruze is overpowered by Francis Drake, Gin appears and takes over the match.
| 6 | "The Man and Woman in the Plaza"; Transliteration: "Hiroba no Danjou" (Japanese: 広場の男女) | August 11, 2012 |
Nate Argenté Loup Mitotsudaira is brutally injured in her battle against F. Walsingham. Gin successfully defeats Drake by the use of a banana peel slip, and Kimi Aoi later retrieves Malga. Shakespeare confronts Toussaint about the promise he made to her during their childhood days to become well-known writers when they grow up. Masazumi Honda is being chased by Christopher Hatton and his army of skeletons, but Tomo Asama luckily finds and rescues her. Tori believes that Horizon has acquired positive emotions to negate the feelings of sorrow she goes through. Tenzo comes across another girl with a striking resemblance to Scarred.
| 7 | "Storyteller in the Hall"; Transliteration: "Hiroma no Kataribe" (Japanese: 広間の語り部) | August 18, 2012 |
Scarred is revealed to be Mary, the one who has been sentenced to death at the Tower of London on account of murder, and the other girl is realized as Queen Elizabeth, the twin sister of Mary. Later that day, some students of Musashi have an audience with Elizabeth, who intends to have them fight for England's sake in the impending naval battle against Tres España. Masazumi has a heated debate with the queen regarding this and other matters. She explains that Musashi needs to collect the Mortal Sin Armaments beforehand, convincing a trade alliance with England to fix history from collapsing. The debate is soon interrupted by Gin of Tres España, along with her envoy Diego Velázquez.
| 8 | "The Decision Maker on High"; Transliteration: "Kousho no Ketteisha" (Japanese: 高所の決定者) | August 25, 2012 |
Toshiee Maeda from P.A. ODA suddenly appears and threatens to make use of his abilities to destroy the Musashi. Even though that Mary should be executed if it is meant to fulfill history, Tori plans to save Mary so Horizon can understand human emotions better. Masazumi proposes to have the Musashi take the place of the English navy in the battle with Tres España. Maeda leaves after he sees that Masazumi has never been to Avalon. The queen later brings Masazumi to Avalon, revealing the nature of the strange phenomena rumored to bring the apocalypse on the entire world is caused by remnants of her past. Tenzo plans to save Mary from execution, much to Tori's amazement, and even King Yoshinao gives his support in this.
| 9 | "One Parting Under the Night Sky"; Transliteration: "Yozora no Betsurisha" (Japanese: 夜空の別離者) | September 1, 2012 |
As the festival comes to a close, some of the students of Musashi join Tenzou's effort to stop Mary's execution, aside from Horizon's absence of emotions, while the rest of the students stay behind to battle against the Tres España armada. Adéle says that the Musashi will circle around England, engaging in four battles against the Tres España. However, the armada splits into two groups, one heading towards England and the other retreating back to Tres España. However, this was just a ruse for the Tres España to attack the Musashi from both sides, yet the Musashi manages to fend off the Tres España to have them fall back.
| 10 | "Howler at the Theatre"; Transliteration: "Gekijou no Houkousha" (Japanese: 劇場の咆哮者) | September 8, 2012 |
As Malga protects Tenzo from Robert Dudley and William Cecil, Kimi Aoi arrives to assist her and confronting them to open a way for Tenzo to reach Mary. Segundo reveals his master plan to keep his country's navy relatively intact by using his previous depleted army from the Battle of Lepanto several years earlier in a suicide run against Musashi. Toussaint takes the opportunity to settle his unfinished business with Shakespeare. Masazumi, being chased by Hatton and his army of skeletons, is saved by the help of Tomo once again. Mitotsudaira engages in battle with Walsingham, and this time manage to defeat her. The Musashi disconnects all eight of its cargo ships to attack the Tres España head on. Toussaint reverses the curse from his hand by altering the script of the play, taking the Aspida Phylargia away from her and making peace with one another.
| 11 | "Successful Candidate in the Flower Garden"; Transliteration: "Hanabatake no Goukakusha" (Japanese: 花畑の合格者) | September 15, 2012 |
After getting past Walter Raleigh, Tenzo finally reaches Mary. Malga and Kimi overpower Dudley and Cecil in their match. Tenzo convinces Mary to give up on the idea of being sacrificed in order to restore the reenactment of history. Tenzo revives England's legendary sword Excalibur Caliburn, which is revealed to contain another set of swords called Excallibur Collbrande, with the Elizabeth receiving the first and Mary the latter. As Tenzou flees with Mary after proposing to her, the students of Musashi Academy brings their full attention to the naval battle, where Juana returns to rescue Segundo and attempt to take the upper hand.
| 12 | "Where the One Scarred by Swords Belongs"; Transliteration: "Ibasho no Ninjou-mochi" (Japanese: 居場所の刃傷持ち) | September 22, 2012 |
Gin, irritated upon hearing that Futayo Honda made love to Muneshige fifty times in the past (due to Futayo claiming it when she actually meant training and did not know training is not sex), confronts Futayo, looking to restore the honor of her husband. Noriki, facing Pedro Valdés and Flores Valdés, finds a way to send back the fireballs thrown at him. When the computer screens of Musashi's ship are disabled, Suzu uses her sensory abilities to transmit visual data into sound in order to perceive the flight path of the ship. Shirojiro is up against Takakane Hironaka, who uses his baseball bat to counteract against Shirojiro's coin attacks, but this proves difficult when the coins flood a cargo ship. Mitotsudaira and Walsingham help Shirojiro defeat Takakane, sending him off the cargo ship. Fusae Era is intervened by Naomasa, and the two fight to the finish in their Gods of War, in which Naomasa sends Fusae plummeting off the ship as well. Gin, nostalgic of her sword fight with Muneshige when she was younger, loses against Futayo in their match.
| 13 | "The Greedy Ones who Cross Borders"; Transliteration: "Sakai-watari no Yokubukimono-tachi" (Japanese: 境渡りの欲深き者達) | September 29, 2012 |
Margot and Malga take out a raid of Tres España airships. Much to Segundo and Juana's surprise, Adéle has the main Musashi ship do an aerial back flip to attack the main Tres España ship from behind. The naval battle finally reaches a conclusion when Tori and Horizon join the fight assisted by the Aspida Philargia, and Tenzo and Mary activate the Excallibur Collbrande to seal the victory for the Musashi forces. After the battle, Mary starts living with Tenzo at the Musashi Academy, while Gin and Muneshige, stripped of their titles, decide to join the academy as well.
