= List of Horizon in the Middle of Nowhere characters =

The following is a list of characters from the Horizon in the Middle of Nowhere anime series.

== Main characters ==
Tori Aoi (葵・トーリ, Aoi Tōri)
Voiced by: Jun Fukuyama (Japanese); Jessie James Grelle (English)
Handle name: Me (俺, Ore)
Tori is the head of the Musashi Ariadust Academy's Supreme Federation, as well as President of the student council. His athletic ability and grades are described as relatively average. Tori is consistently cheerful and rarely somber. He is seen crying only on one occasion, which is shortly after the discovery of the death of his childhood friend. Although he consistently jokes around, he is largely respected by the student body. After it is declared that he is Viceroy of Musashi, Tori gains access to 1/4 of the ship's energy supply. After signing a contract with the Asama Shrine, he gains a power that allows him to channel energy to his allies. This ability is used to activate Ólos Phthonos and unlock the power of the Mortal Sin Armaments. In order for Tori to make the ability work, he must remain cheerful and happy for the rest of his life. Despite his cheerful and joking personality, he is seen as a capable leader and consistently comes up with unexpected solutions.

P-01s (ピー・ゼロワンエス, Pī Zerowan'esu) / Horizon Ariadust (ホライゾン・アリアダスト, Horaizon Ariadasuto)
Voiced by: Minori Chihara (Japanese); Emily Neves (English)
Handle name: Horako (ホラ子, Horako)
P-01s is an android, employed at the bakery shop "Blue Thunder", which is largely popular among the Musashi students. She has no memories prior to her sudden appearance outside Blue Thunder, a year before the beginning of the story. Although she is incapable of emotion and largely unsociable, she works considerably hard at Blue Thunder. She is also the reason Tori consistently came to Blue Thunder, due to her resemblance to his childhood friend/love interest, Horizon. Later though, it turns out that she is in fact, Horizon. Although, as P-01s, she has access to the ninth Mortal Sin Armament. Her emotions are spread out into the Nine Mortal Sin Armaments, which Tori vows to gather for her. Towards the end of the story, she comes into possession of the emotion of sadness. After obtaining the Mortal Sin Armament of Ambition, she promises to make use of her newfound greed to have her classmates stop the apocalypse and claim a better future for all of Musashi.

== Minor Characters from Musashi ==
=== Musashi Ariadust Academy students ===
Masazumi Honda (本多・正純, Honda Masazumi)
Voiced by: Miyuki Sawashiro (Japanese); Genevieve Simmons (English)
Handle name: Vice President (副会長, Fukukaichou)
Masazumi Honda is the vice president of the student council and a skilled debater. In the past, she attempted gender-reassignment surgery, but unknown circumstances forced her to stop. As a result, she is still treated as a girl, although she used to wear male clothing after the reassignment. After a lecture by Innocnentius, she began to again wear female clothing.

Futayo Honda (本多・二代, Honda Futayo)
Voiced by: Yu Kobayashi (Japanese); Kendall McClellan (Season 1), Carli Mosier (Season 2) (English)
Handle name: Dragonfly Cutter (蜻蛉切, Tonbokiri)
Futayo Honda is the head of Mikawa Security Corps. She is also Honda Masazumi's second cousin, and the daughter of Tadakatsu Honda, who is one of the four divine Matsudaira kings. Due to strict training from her father, she became a skilled fighter, although she was generally clueless about social norms and the outside world. She is also easily embarrassed, causing her to consistently drop her guard. After the death of her father, she inherited a Divine Weapon, entitled Tonbokiri. A contract with her god, granted Futayo increased speed for each swing of her weapon, giving her an endless speed boost. After her defeat in a battle with kimi, she enrolls at Musashi Ariadust Academy.

Toussaint Neshinbara (トゥーサン・ネシンバラ, Tūsan Neshinbara)
Voiced by: Mutsumi Tamura (Japanese); Beth Lazarou (English)
Handle name: Novice (未熟者, Mijukumono)
Toussaint Neshinbara is the secretary for student council. He has a dry personality and often does not react to goofing around. AltHs a romanticist who deeply loves history, and hopes at some point to be wrcomeia ter. During the war of nations, he was put in charge of drafting and commanding strategies.

Shirojiro Bertoni (シロジロ・ベルトーニ, Shirojiro Berutōni)
Voiced by: Takehito Koyasu (Japanese); Justin Doran (Season 1), Kyle Downing (Season 2) (English)
Handle name: Miser (守銭奴, Shusendo)
Shirojiro Bertoni, is the accountant for the student council, and was previously a merchant at Musashi's business association. He has a contract with the god of commerce that allows his attacks to be more powerful based on his personal wealth. His decisions are consistently based on what would earn him more money. His name originates from Chaya Shirojiro, which is the name of a series of wealthy and influential merchants in Kyoto, from 1545 until the late 1700s.

Heidi Augesvarer (ハイディ・オーゲザヴァラー, Haidi Ogezavarā)
Voiced by: Kaori Nazuka (Japanese); Cynthia Martinez (English)
Handle name: Marubeya (○べ屋, Marubeya)
Heidi Augesvarer is Shirojiro's partner. She is consistently happy and always accompanied by Erimaki, her fox-like Maus.

Tenzo Crossunite (点蔵・クロスユナイト, Tenzō Kurosuyunaito)
Voiced by: Daisuke Ono (Japanese); John Gremillion (Season 1), Mike Yager (Season 2) (English)
Handle name: Tenzo (十ZO, Ten-ZO) (kanji for 10 read as "Ten")
Tenzo Crossunite is the first Special Duty Officer of the Supreme Federation. He was a ninja who specialized in close combat. Although he was a nice person, he was quite perverted and had a fetish for big-breasted blonde girls. His face always covered his eyes cast in shadow. He was most notable by wearing a ballcap that had animated eyes, showing his hidden expressions. Tenzo was the first to encounter Mary when she was in her Scarred disguise. When her identity was revealed, Tenzo fell in love with her and decided to rescue her from the Tower of London. When she transfersredto the Musashi, they shared a room together as husband and wife.

Mary (メアリ, Meari)
Voiced by: Yui Horie (Japanese); Shelley Calene-Black (English)
Handle name: Scarred (傷有り, Kizuari)
Mary was introduced in the second season of the series. Firstly, she was introduced as Scarred, who hid their identity with a cloak, revealing nothing but a scar on her face and iron shackles on her ankles. She is later revealed to be named Mary Stuart, and to be the twin sister of Queen Elizabeth. Previously, she was given the role of Mary Tudor, and was destined to be executed. But she was rescued by Tenzo, whom she later married.

Kiyonari Ulquiaga (キヨナリ・ウルキアガ, Kiyonari Urukiaga)
Voiced by: Takaya Kuroda (Japanese); Sam Roman (English)
Handle name: Ukii (ウキー, Ukii)
Kiyonari Ulquiaga is a half dragon and second Special Duty Officer of the Supreme Foundation.

Margot Naito (マルゴット・ナイト, Marugotto Naito)
Voiced by: Nao Tōyama (Japanese); Kris Carr (Season 1), Allison Sumrall (Season 2) (English)
Handle name: Maru-Gold (金○, Kin Maru)
Margot is the third Special Duty Officer at the Supreme Foundation, and a lesbian. She was lovers with Malga Naruze, whom she rebelled against the Catholic Church with.

Malga Naruze (マルガ・ナルゼ, Maruga Naruze)
Voiced by: Emi Nitta (Japanese); Brittney Karbowski (English)
Handle name: Maru-Ga (● 画, Maru Ga)
The fourth Special Duty Officer was a white witch with black wings. She and Margot were lovers, which made the two lesbian witches openly rebel against the Catholic Church. Malga was also a manga artist.

Nate "Argenté Loup" Mitotsudaira (ネイト・ミトツダイラ, Neito Mitotsudaira)
Voiced by: Marina Inoue (Japanese); Rebekah Stevens (English)
Handle name: Silver Wolf (銀 狼, Ginrou)
Nate "Argente Loup" Mitotsudaira was a half-wolf and a knight from Hexagone Francaise. She was the only active duty knight in Musashi, due to the age and inexperience of the other knights, or those that had been forced out due to graduation.

Naomasa (直政, Naomasa)
Voiced by: Kei Shindo (Japanese); Shelley Calene-Black (Season 1), Maggie Flecknoe (Season 2) (English)
Handle name: Cigarette Woman (煙草女, Tabako Onna)
Naomasa was the sixth Special Duty Officer of the Supreme Foundation, and a citizen of Qing-Takeda, as well as a member of the Musashi Engineering Club. Her right arm is mechanical, she also rides a Bushin (a giant mechanized unity. She was also nicknamed the "Tobacco Lady" due to her smoking habits.

Kimi Aoi (葵・喜美, Aoi Kimi)
Voiced by: Chiwa Saitō (Japanese); Maggie Flecknoe (English)
Handle name: Wise Sister (賢 姉様, Ken Neesama)
Kimi Aoi is the older sister of Tori Aoi. She is constantly seen picking on him, although she cares greatly for him. She cried over the sadness of her brother after the death of his childhood friend, Horizon. She began a contract with the god of dance and sensuality, giving her protection from being touched by anyone she did not wish to be touched by. Her specialty is using dancing to avoid any attack.

Tomo Asama (浅間・智, Asama Tomo)
Voiced by: Ami Koshimizu (Japanese); Luci Christian (English)
Handle name: Asama (あさま, Asama)
Tomo Asama is a Shinto priestess of the Asama Shrine, and a childhood friend of Tori. Due to a rule emat Tomo cannot bring harm to anyone, she shoots down planes instead, as it does not directly harm the occupant.

Adéle Balfette (アデーレ・バルフェット, Adēre Barufetto)
Voiced by: Ayuru Ōhashi (Japanese); Monica Rial (English)
Handle name: Poor Retainer (貧従士, Hinjyuushi)
A girl from Hexagone Française who worked as a retainer for knights was the commander of the Musashi when the vessel was engaged in ship warfare. Despite fighting with heavy weaponry, she had impressive mobility. During land battles, she wore heavy armor and even used Persona as a shield.

Suzu Mukai (向井・鈴, Mukai Suzu)
Voiced by: Aoi Yūki (Japanese); Meg McDonald (English)
Handle name: Bell (ベ ル, Be Ru)
Suzu Mukai is a blind girl, who has a crush on Tori.

Noriki (ノリキ, Noriki)
Voiced by: Daisuke Hirakawa (Japanese); John Gremillion (Season 1), David Matranga (Season 2) (English)
Handle name: Hardworker (労働者, Roudousha)
Noriki works several part-time jobs to support his family, and specializes in physical attacks.

Ginji Ohiroshiki (御広敷・銀二, Ohiroshiki Ginji)
Voiced by: Minoru Shiraishi (Japanese); Andrew Love (Season 1), Bryan Leach (Season 2) (English)
Handle name: Man of Worship (礼賛者, Raisansha)
A fat student who ate a lot, was a member of the academy's cooking club. He was an otaku and a lolicon, although he constantly denies being a lolicon. He was also a sponsor to most child caretaking facilities in Musashi.

Persona (ペルソナ君, Perusona-kun)
Handle name: Buckets (ばけつ, Baketsu)
A giant, strong man who wore a bucket helmet.

Kenji Ito (伊藤・健児, Itō Kenji)
Voiced by: Eiji Miyashita (Japanese); Chris Hutchison (Season 1), David Wald (Season 2) (English)
Handle name: Obscenity (いんび, Inbi)
A naked and muscular incubus with a cheerful personality could transform into gas and absorb energy from other creature.

Nenji (ネンジ, Nenji)
Voiced by: Daisuke Hirakawa (Japanese); John Gremillion (Season 1), David Matranga (Season 2) (English)
Handle name: Sticky King (粘着王, Nenchaku-Ou)
A slime spirit had 3 HP but he was able to regenerate himself after being destroyed to pieces and capable of limited shape shifting.

Hassan Fullbush (ハッサン・フルブシ, Hassan Furubushi)
Voiced by: Daisuke Ono (Japanese); Andrew Love (Season 1), John Gremillion (Season 2) (English)
Handle name: Hassan (83, Ha San)
An Indian student who loved curry, his attacks always involve curry.

Miriam Poqou (ミリアム・ポークウ, Miriam Pōkuu)
Voiced by: Ai Matayoshi (Japanese); Joy Saxton (English)
A paralyzed girl used a wheelchair. Due to her disability, she was home-schooled inside her boarding room at the dormitory.

Azuma (東, Azuma)
Voiced by: Rika Morinaga (Japanese); Jennifer Alyx (Season 1), Molly Searcy (Season 2) (English)
Handle name: Azuma (あずま, Azuma)
The Crown Prince of the Divine States was a half-god and enrolled in the academy despite his status. Despite having his power as half-god sealed, his status as crown prince still held great influence to the peoples. He was Miriam's roommate.

Hiro Mishima (三科 大, Mishima Hiro)
Voiced by: Megumi Toyoguchi (Japanese); Joy Saxton (English)
Handle name: Mishina (347, Mi Shi Na)
Leader of the Musashi Machinery Department. She was originally from Qing-Takeda's Jueluo Academy before transferring to Musashi Ariadust Academy. She was a longtime colleague of Naomasa and a machine otaku.

=== Musashi Ariadust Academy faculty ===
Makiko Oriotorai (オリオトライ・真喜子, Oriotorai Makiko)
Voiced by: Ryoko Shiraishi (Japanese); Elizabeth Bunch (English)
The homeroom teacher for Class 3-Plum at Musashi Ariadust Academy. She has highly athletic skills, to the point where she is called a "Real Amazon".

Mitsuki Sanyou (三要・光紀, San'yō Mitsuki)
Voiced by: Ai Shimizu (Japanese); Elizabeth Bunch (English)
The homeroom teacher for Class 3-Bamboo at Musashi Ariadust Academy, next door to Class 3-Plum.

Tadatsugu Sakai (酒井・忠次, Sakai Tadatsugu)
Voiced by: Taiten Kusunoki (Japanese); George Manley (English)
The president of Musashi Ariadust Academy. He used to be one of the Four Heavenly Kings of the Matsudaira.

Yoshinao (ヨシナオ, Yoshinao)
Voiced by: Mitsuaki Madono (Japanese); David Wald (Season 1), Justin Doran (Season 2) (English)
The current king of Musashi and vice-principal of Musashi Ariadust Academy. Tori often makes fun of his appearance that looks similar to the king in a deck of cards.

=== Other Musashi citizens ===
Musashi (武蔵, Musashi)
Voiced by: Mai Nakahara (Japanese); Rozie Curtis (English)
An automaton managing the vessel of the same name. Under her are eight automatons that acts as the respective captains of the eight vessels that formed Musashi.

Yoshiki Aoi (葵・善鬼, Aoi Yoshiki)
Voiced by: Miho Yamada (Japanese); Susan Koozin (English)
The owner of the Blue Thunder and the mother of Tori and Kimi.

== Mikawa ==
Motonobu Matsudaira (松平・元信, Matsudaira Motonobu)
Voiced by: Sho Hayami (Japanese); Andy McAvin (English)
The Lord of Mikawa and Horizon Ariadust's father, he's also the creator of the Mortal Sin Armaments. He is responsible for the area's current isolation policy. He provokes the meltdown of the Ley Reactor on the Shin-Nagoya Castle in Mikawa in order to start his "Genesis Project", despite dying in said meltdown.

Tadakatsu Honda (本多・忠勝, Honda Tadakatsu)
Voiced by: Sumi Naomi (Japanese); Mike Yager (English)
Futayo's father and former wielder of the Divine Weapon Tonbokiri. Very loyal to Motonobu Matsudaira, he took part in the Mikawa Meltdown, fighting Muneshige Tachibana. Even though he defeats Muneshige, when Gin Tachibana confronts him, he simply hands over Tonbokiri to her to be given to Futayo. He then stays behind alongside Kazuno, dying in the meltdown.

Kazuno (鹿角, Kazuno)
Voiced by: Ryōko Shintani (Japanese); Hilary Haag (English)
An automaton who works for the Honda family in Mikawa. Not only are both the cooking and sword skills of Tadakatsu’s late wife perfectly replicated, but her sharp tongue is as well. She's capable of controlling gravity. She remains with Tadakatsu during the Mikawa Meltdown, revealing that she also holds his late wife's soul, dying alongside him.

== Tres España ==
Felipe Segundo (フェリペ・セグンド, Feripe Segundo)
Voiced by: Tetsu Shiratori (Japanese); Mark X. Laskowski (English)
Chancellor of the academy Alcalá de Henares and the student council president. Despite his status, he does not want to get involved with politics, specially since during the reenactment of the Battle of Lepanto, it costed the life of his wife, children and many of his friends. When he tries to die in the battle against Musashi, he's saved by Juana.

Juana (フアナ, Fuana)
Voiced by: Rie Tanaka (Japanese); Holland Vavra (Season 1), Kalin Coates (Season 2) (English)
Vice president and accountant of the student council. She is one of the Eight Great Dragon Kings and possesses the Mortal Sin Armament Akēdia Katathlipsē. During her childhood, she was saved by Felipe then is his most loyal subordinate, eventually confessing her love for him after she rushes to save his life during the naval battle against the Musashi.

Diego Velázquez (ディエゴ・ベラスケス, Diego Berasukesu)
Voiced by: Kenta Miyake (Japanese); David Wald (English)
Secretary of Alcalá de Henares student council. He is the owner of the Testament Armament Crus Temperantia Novum. He is also a famous eroge novelist

Muneshige Tachibana (立花・宗茂, Tachibana Muneshige)
Voiced by: Tomokazu Sugita (Japanese); Illich Guardiola (Season 1), Adam Gibbs (Season 2) (English)
Handle name: Tachibana (Husband) (立花夫, Tachibana Otto)
First Special Duty of the academy Alcalá de Henares. He possesses the Mortal Sin Armament Lypē Katathlipsē. He has a serious personality, but is also amiable. He is named after the samurai Tachibana Muneshige.

Gin Tachibana (立花・誾, Tachibana Gin)
Voiced by: Minako Kotobuki (Japanese); Shannon Emerick (English)
Handle name: Tachibana (Wife) (立花妻, Tachibana Tsuma)
Muneshige's wife with prosthetic arms. She can summon heavy artillery with her power. She is clueless about the world and is prone to misunderstanding things. She is named after the samurai Muneshige's wife, Tachibana Ginchiyo.

Takakane Hironaka (弘中・隆包, Hironaka Takakane)
Voiced by: Hiroki Yasumoto (Japanese); Andrew Love (English)
Vice-chancellor of Alcalá de Henares and the husband of Fusae Era. He is the head of the academy's baseball club and uses a baseball bat for fighting. He lives on as a ghost having been previously killed during the Battle of Lepanto. He's also the wielder of the Testament Armament Crus Temperantia Vetus.

Fusae Era (江良・房栄, Era Fusae)
Voiced by: Masumi Asano (Japanese); Amy Bruce (Season 1), Shannon Hill (Season 2) (English)
2nd Special Agent of the Chancellor's Board of Alcalá de Henares and the wife of Takakane Hironaka. Also known as Álvaro de Bazán, she owns the God of War called Michiyukibyakko. She lives on as a ghost having been previously killed during the Battle of Lepanto.

Pedro Valdés (ぺデロ・バルデス, Pedero Barudesu)
Voiced by: Yoshihisa Kawahara (Japanese); Kalob Martinez (Season 1), Mark X. Laskowski (Season 2) (English)
4th Special Agent of the Chancellor's Board of Alcalá de Henares and the older brother of Flores. He fights by pitching baseballs fused with explosives.

Flores Valdés (フローレス・バルデス, Furooresu Barudesu)
Voiced by: Yūko Sanpei (Japanese); Beth Lazarou (Season 1), Brittney Karbowski (Season 2) (English)
5th Special Agent of the Chancellor's Board of Alcalá de Henares and the younger sister of Pedro. She fights by pitching softballs.

== K.P.A. Italia ==
Innocentius (インノケンティウス, Innokentiusu)
Voiced by: Jōji Nakata (Japanese); Rob Mungle (Season 1), David Matranga (Season 2) (English)
Handle name: Pope (教 皇, Kyou Ou)
The Pope-President of the academy K.P.A. Scuola. He is a highly ambitious leader who intends to expand his power and influence under the pretext of recreating history. He is named after the Pope Innocent X.

Galileo (ガリレオ, Garireo)
Voiced by: Tsuyoshi Koyama (Japanese); Jovan Jackson (Season 1), Patrick Poole (Season 2) (English)
Handle name: Professor (教授, Kyouju)
An archdevil. He uses Ptolemaic and Copernican theories for his abilities. He was a principal at K.P.A. Scuola in the past. He has become one of his most trusted followers in order to resolve a degenerate world. He is named after the astronomer Galileo Galilei.

Olimpia (オリンピア, Orinpia)
Handle name: Pope’s Little Sister (教皇妹, Kyouou Imouto)
Innocentius’ younger sister, shown in a brief flash in the last episode of second season during the communication between Innocentius and Galileo.
She’s from a race that “grow old” backward, meaning she started elderly and became a child as she 'aged'.

Dosetsu Tachibana (立花・道雪, Tachibana Dousetsu)
Handle name: Lightning Cutter (雷切, Kaminari Kiri)
Gin Tachibana’s father and the former “Peerless Man of the West”. Currently living in a God of War and works for K.P.A. Italia.

== England ==
Elizabeth (エリザベス, Erizabesu)
Voiced by: Yukari Tamura (Japanese); Shelley Calene-Black (English)
Handle name: Queen (女王, Jouou)
The current ruling queen of England and the president of TRUMPS, the chancellor's board and student council of England's Oxford Academy. She is a half-fairy.

Robert Dudley (ロバート・ダッドリー, Robāto Daddorī)
Voiced by: Miho Yamada (Japanese); Luci Christian (English)
Handle name: Vice President (副 長, Fukuchou)
The vice-chancellor of TRUMPS. She is frail and that causes her to have high blood pressure. The chain around her wrist and ankle is as symbol that she’s being imprisoned, as part of her role as Robert Dudley. She's also the wielder of the Testament Armament Brachium Justitia Novum.

William Cecil (ウイリアム・セシル, Uiriamu Seshiru)
Voiced by: Natsuko Kuwatani (Japanese); Elizabeth Bunch (English)
Handle name: Cecil (セシル, Seshiru)
The student council vice-president of TRUMPS. She has an egg-shaped body and likes to participate in eating contests. Her ability is to restrain an enemy by making it as heavy as her.

Ben Johnson (ベン・ジョンソン, Ben Jonson)
Voiced by: Masaya Onosaka (Japanese); Leraldo Anzaldua (English)
Handle name: Medicinal Poet (薬詩人, Yakushijin)
The student council secretary of TRUMPS. He is an athlete-poet and heads the academy's literary club.

Thomas Shakespeare (トマス・シェイクスピア, Tomasu Sheikusupia)
Voiced by: Momoko Saito (Japanese); Jessica Boone (English)
Handle name: Eyeglasses (眼 鏡, Megane)
A student at Oxford Academy and the famous writer in England. She is an elf and owner of the Mortal Sin Armament calle Aspida Phylargis. Having a history with Toussaint, she challenges him during the Musashi's incursion on England, not only forcing him to retreat but afflicting him with the spell "Curse of Macbeth" that would force him to kill Aoi just as Macbeth from Shakespeare's play of the same name killed his king. During their rematch, Toussaint alters the nature of the curse to use it at his favor and defeat Thomas, finally getting on terms with her before she surrenders Aspida Phylargis to him.

Nicholas Bacon (ニコラス・ベーコン, Nikorasu Bēkon)
Voiced by: Yūko Sanpei (Japanese); Clint Bickham (English)
Handle name: Seal Kid (印鑑子, Inbanko)
Assistant secretary of TRUMPS. A fairy that guarded the state seal of England.

Charles Howard (チャールズ・ハワード, Chāruzu Hawādo)
Voiced by: Ken Narita (Japanese); David Wald (English)
Handle name: Simple Trade (地味商, Jimishou)
Treasurer of Oxford Academy and 7th in TRUMPS. As treasurer, he’s the owner of the English naval fleet, but because he doesn’t have any ability in battle he settled back to fleet management and let holds the command during battles.

F. Walsingham (F・ウオルシンガム, F. Uorushingamu)
Voiced by: Natsuko Kuwatani (Japanese); Kendall McClellan (English)
Handle name: Guard Dog (番犬, Banken)
An automaton and student at Oxford Academy, who only speaks in english. She can control gravity.

Francis Drake (フランシス·ドレーク, Furanshisu Dorēku)
Voiced by: Ryota Takeuchi (Japanese); John Gremillion (English)
A werewolf and a member of TRUMPS. He owns the Testament Armament Brachium Justitia Vetus.

John Hawkins (ジョン·ホーキンス, Jon Hōkinsu)
Voiced by: Susumu Chiba (Japanese); Blake Shepard (English)
A member of TRUMPS and the head of the swimming club. He can summon a sphere of water so that he can fight using his underwater combat abilities.

Thomas Cavendish (トーマス·キャベンディッシュ, Tōmasu Kyabendisshu)
Voiced by: Ryoka Yuzuki (Japanese); Wendy Martin (English)
Handle name: Koto Mermaid (琴人魚, Koto ningyou)
A mermaid and a member of TRUMPS. She is the wife of Hawkins.

Grace O'Malley (グレイス・オマリ, Gureisu Omari)
Voiced by: Megumi Toyoguchi (Japanese); Kendall McClellan (English)
Handle name: O'mari (御 鞠, Omari)
A sea pirate and best friend of Elizabeth. A tree spirit with specialty in healing magic. Captain of the ship Granuaile. She’s married with many children.

Walter Raleigh (ウオルター・ローリー, Uorutā Rōrī)
Voiced by: Tōru Ōkawa (Japanese); Summar Salah (English)
Handle name: Yama (山, Mountain)
An instructor in land-based battle at Oxford Academy. He is a samurai who also goes by the name of Yukimori Yamanaka.

Christopher Hatton (クリストファー·ハットン, Kurisutofā Hatton)
Voiced by: Tōru Ōkawa (Japanese); Andrew Love (English)
Handle name: Death (デス夫, Desu O)
A kinematic skeleton priest. Has the habit of saying “desu” as “Death”.

Milton (ミルトン, Miruton)
Voiced by: Yoshihisa Kawahara (Japanese); Mark X. Laskowski (English)
A three-legged crow who serves Mary. He used to be known as Yokomichi.

== P.A. ODA ==
Nobunaga Oda (織田・信長, Oda Nobunaga)
The Chancellor and Student Council President of the P.A. ODA academy P.A.M. Her physical existence has been hidden in order to prevent the Testament Union from killing her by history recreation. She is an automaton named P-01m who has control of Horizon Ariadust's original human body, as well as Horizon's old memories. She uses Toukichirou Hashiba's body to interact with the outside world since Horizon's body was so badly injured Nobunaga herself can only be active for two hours a day. As part of the Genesis Project, Nobunaga will be linked to destiny via the second moon (the ether one), act as a vessel for destiny's personality, and be executed.

Katsuie Shibata (柴田・勝家, Shibata Katsuie)
Handle name: Great Senpai (大先輩)
Top member of the Five Great Peaks and P.A.O.M. Vice-Chancellor. A mighty demon-type elf, the husband of Oichi (whom he deeply loves) and Nobunaga Oda's brother-in-law. Dual-successor of Katsuie Shibata and the Count of Tilly names.

Mitsuhide Akechi (明智・光秀, Akechi Mitsuhide)
Student Council Vice-President of P.A.M. academy and one of the Five Great Peaks.

Nagahide Niwa (丹羽・長秀, Niwa Nagahide)
The secretary of P.A. ODA academy P.A.M. and one of the Five Great Peaks.

Toshiie Maeda (前田・利家, Maeda Toshiie)
Voiced by: Toshiyuki Toyonaga (Japanese); Blake Shepard (English)
Handle name: You (お前田, Omaeda)
The treasurer of P.A. ODA academy P.A.M. and one of the Five Great Peaks. He is also known as King Albrecht von Wallenstein.

Matsu (お松, Omatsu)
Assistant treasurer of P.A. ODA academy. Wife of Toshiie Maeda and a mini ghost girl. Because she’s transformed into an ability, she consume ether all the time to survive and has high upkeep cost.

Narimasa Sassa (佐々・成政, Sassa Narimassa)
Handle name: Lily (百合花)
Toshiie Maeda's partner and also owner of the Divine Weapon Israfil. He is also one of the Five Great Peaks. A rude, quick-tempered but also methodical young officer that looks like a delinquent, but acts in accordance to hierarchy. He also inherited the name of Baba Aruj.

Oichi (御市様, Oichi)
Handle name: O-12 (o-ichi-ni)
The younger sister of Nobunaga Oda and the wife of Katsuie Shibata. A very competent and calm person with a skill for cooking and a knack for gardening. However, she possesses a "battle switch" of sorts, which transforms her personality into a frightening killing machine when triggered.

== Hexagone Français ==
Louis Exiv
The Chancellor of École de Paris Academy. He's one of the Eight Great Dragon Kings and possesses the Mortal Sin Armament Phos Kenodoxia. He has divine blood and he's also the wielder of the Testament Armament Corpus Prudentia Vetus.

Turenne (テュレンヌ, Tyurennu)
Handle name: Active Lady (現役娘)
Vice-chancellor of École de Paris Academy, a werewolf known as Reine de Garou and Nate Mitotsudaira's mother. She wields the Divine Weapon Argent Croix.

Terumoto Mori (毛利・輝元, Mori Terumoto)
Handle name: A bad girl in former times (元ヤン)
The Student Council President of École de Paris Academy and Louis Exiv's wife. She is also one of the Eight Great Dragon Kings and possesses the Mortal Sin Armament Phuos Hyperēphania. She's also the wielder of the Testament Armament Corpus Prudentia Novum. Sometimes she hits her husband because he goes naked all the time.

Anne D'Autriche
A student of École de Paris Academy, Hexagone Française’s previous chancellor and student council president. Louis Exiv’s younger sister.

Luynes (リュイヌ, Ryuinu)
Handle name: Dragon Dog (竜犬)
An automaton, Anne's aide and the Student Council Vice-President of École de Paris Academy.

== Qing-Takeda ==
Yoshitsune Kurou Minamoto (源・九郎・義経, Minamoto Kurou Yoshitsune)
A full-blooded elf and Chancellor and Student Council President of Jueluo Academy. Despite her young appearance, she is actually a person who already has three digits worth of history behind her, only second to the Emperor himself. She also inherited the names of Kublai Khan and Shingen Takeda.

Yoshiyori Satomi (里見・義頼, Satomi Yoshiyori)
Handle name: Yatsufusa (八房)
The chancellor and leader of Satomi Academy, one of the academies of Qing-Takeda. A kind-hearted peaceful man with a compassionate smile who wants to prevent the meaningless deaths caused by the Testament Union and its History Recreation.

Yoshiyasu Satomi (里見・義康, Satomi Yoshiyasu)
Handle name: Justice (義)
The Student Council President of Satomi Academy. A very serious and obstinate young elf girl with a serious sense of duty and responsibility, she is Yoshiyori's "Little Sister". She pilots the God of War: Justice.

== Union of Indian States ==
Ujinao Houjou (北条・氏直, Hōjō Ujinao)
The Chancellor and Student Council President of the Sanadawara Academy. She used to be an elf, but due to health problems her soul was transferred to an automaton. She uses giant gravity swords as her weapon of choice. She likes Noriki, despite his antisocial appearance.

== M.H.R.R. ==
Matias
Chancellor and Student Council President of A.H.R.R.S., who also wields the Mortal Sin Armament Pheugos Gastrimargia.

Hideyoshi Toukichirou Hashiba (羽柴・藤吉郎・秀吉, Hashiba Toukichirou Hideyoshi)
A student of P.A.O.M. and Student Council Vice President of M.H.R.R. She is also ranked sixth in P.A. ODA's Five Great Peaks. An automaton with a petite build that resembles a young girl, her face is occluded by a monkey mask. She also inherited the name of Melchior Klesl.

Tomoe Gozen (巴御前, Gozen Tomoe)
Handle name: Gozen sama (午前様, Gozen sama)
The Student Council Secretary of A.H.R.R.S. A Demon-type elf and the wielder of the Testament Arma Animus Caritas Vetus. She also inherited the name of Martin Luther.

== Sibir Interior State ==
Masamune Date (伊達・政宗, Date Masamune)
The Chancellor and Student Council President of the Sendai Date Academy. She is also a daughter of a dragon.

Narumi Date (伊達・成実, Date Narumi)
Handle name: Indomitable (不退転)
Vice-Chancellor of the Sendai Date Academy. She is cool and mature. But she isn't so diplomatic. She has prosthetic arms and legs. These arms can be summoned and exchanged immediately when she fight.

Yoshiaki Mogami (最上・義光, Mogami Yoshiaki)
A half-fox and head of the Mogami Family, acting as its Chancellor and Student Council President. She owns the flying ship Yamagatajou. She is also the owner of the Divine Weapon Onikiri.

== Sviet Rus ==
Kagekatsu Uesugi (上杉・景勝, Uesugi Kagekatsu)
The Chancellor of J.M.K academy. He also inherited the names of Ivan the Terrible

Kanetsugu Naoe (直江・兼続, Naoe Kanetsugu)
The Vice-Chancellor and Vice-President of the Student Council of J.M.K. academy.

Shigenaga Honjou (本庄 繁長, Honjō Shigenaga)
3rd Special Unit of J.M.K. academy.

Marfa Boretskaya
The Mayor of Novgorod, she's also one of the Eight Dragon Kings, wielding the Mortal Sin Armament Maska Orgē, who later gives it back to Horizon.

== Terminology ==
=== General terms ===
Testament
A history book that records the history of the former earth. To ensure mankind's eventual return to space, the original History is recreated by reenacting its main events in the chronological order with selected individuals reprising the role of historical figures of said events. For some reason the recreation of History is halted in 1648 with the last event predicted to be reenacted being the Peace of Westphalia. There are rumors that this occurs because the apocalypse is set to happen after these particular events. In these events, the Far East currently play a neutral role as by that time in the original History, Japan was under the Shogunate of Tokugawa, isolated from the rest of world, thus having little to no participation at all in events occurring overseas.

Harmonic Divine States
Administrative divisions ruled by different countries in the Testament era. The Harmonic Divine States are the Far East (ruled by Japan), Tres España (Spain and Portugal), K.P.A. Italia (Italy), Hexagone Française (France), England, Qing-Takeda (China), Sviet Rus (Russia), P.A. ODA (Ottoman Empire), M.H.R.R. (Holy Roman Empire), United States of India and the Africa Union. Several areas were left undeveloped by purpose to be occupied in the future as the recreation of History continues, like the New Continent (Americas).

Maus
A miniature contractor god that can enhance the user's fighting capabilities.

Divine Transmission (通神, Tsūshin)
The way of wireless communication in this era. It's a pun with the word 通信 (Tsūshin), which means communication.

Haiki (拝気)
The energy used to use abilities in the series.

Ether (流体, Ryūtai)
The basic substance that gives form to all existence. Mankind at that point is advanced enough to harness the Ether itself and use it as energy source and to construct materials directly from it. It is believed that the impending apocalypse is to be caused by a strange phenomena that recently appeared that consumes all Ether it comes in contact with and upon taking heed of it, the Harmonic Divine States start working together to keep it from spreading, to the point of sharing all research they make about it.

=== Armaments ===
Armaments (武装, Busō) are technology used in this era.

==== Ships ====
Musashi
A quasi-behemoth-class ship. Composed of eight individual ships, it essentially serves as a flying city and also as an independent territory of the same name. Overall managed by an automaton of the same name with eight automatons that compromise the other ships under her.

Asakusa : First port ship. Freighter ship with four derricks installed.
Murayama : Second port ship. Serves as the administration, diplomacy, and tourism sections of the Musashi.
Oume : Third port ship. Contains Musashi's residential and industrial areas.
Shinagawa : First starboard ship. Same as Asakusa.
Tama : Second starboard ship. Same as Murayama.
Takao : Third starboard ship. Same as Oume.
Musashino : Center leading ship. Holds the "Inadequate HQ" command center of Musashi.
Okutama : Center trailing ship. Holds the Musashi Ariadust Academy, student dormitories, as well as Remorse Way.

==== God of War ====
A God of War (武神, Bushin) is a gigantic mechanized unit controlled by either the pilot (as data through disintegration) or through remote. Mass-produced or custom-built, these units can replicate human reaction times in real-time, therefore making it the most superior among all mechanized units. The Gods of War are classified based on their overall weight (i.e. light, medium, and heavy).

==== Weapons ====
===== Divine Armaments =====
Divine Armaments (神格武装, Shinkaku Busō) are the general weapons with abilities. They have 2 activations: Normal Activation (通常駆動, Tsūjō Kudō) and Superior Activation (上位駆動, Jōi Kudō). They have an ether limit which needs to be filled when empty, and thus prevents the user from constantly using high level activations.

Tonbokiri (蜻蛉切)
Normal Activation: Cut anything physical reflected by the blade
Superior Activation: Cut the concept imagined by the user

Tadakatsu Honda's Divine Armament, before his end he gave it to Gin which later she gave to Futayo.

Argent Chaîné (銀鎖 (アルジョント・シエイナ))
Normal Activation:
Superior Activation:

Mitotsudaira's Divine Armament, it has a consciousness and will act by itself if Mitotsudaira is in danger. When it wants to express its feelings it uses the chains to shape out words.

===== Mortal Sin Armaments =====
Mortal Sin Armaments (大罪武装, Taizai Busō), known as Logismoi Óplo (Greek: Λογισμοι όπλο; Japanese: ロイズモイ・オプロ, Roizumoi Opuro) are weapons of destructive power, powered by the power of sins. They are made using Horizon's emotions, thus stripping most of Horizon's personality by the completion, with only the feeling of envy left. They have Normal Activation like Divine Armaments, but instead of Superior Activation they have Overdrive Activation (超過駆動, Chōka Kudō). In addition, all Mortal Sin Armaments have another activation called Soul Activation (魂の駆動, Tamashii no Kudō), which is only limited for Horizon to use. However, to use Soul Activation, she will need Tori's ability. Reclaiming all of them is Musashi's goal of the series. As of volume 4C of the novel, Horizon has 3 in possession, with the exception of Olos Phtonos. The user of any Mortal Sin Armaments are referred as Eight Great Dragon Kings (八大竜王, Hachidai Ryūō), with the exception of Horizon.

Lypē Katathlipsē (リピ・カタスリプシ, Ripi Katasuripushi) (Greek: Λύπη Κατάθλιψη; Japanese: 悲嘆の怠惰, Hitan no Taida)
Motif: Anguish (part of sloth)
Normal Activation: Cut anything reflected by the blade
Overdrive Activation: Destroys anything 3km in front of its cannon blast (wheel-like).

A gunblade-type armament used by Muneshige Tachibana of Tres España. It was recovered by Futayo when she defeated Muneshige.

Stithos Porneia (ステイソス・ポルネイア, Suteinsu Poruneia) (Greek: Στήθος Πορνεία, Breast of Lustfulness; Japanese: 淫蕩の御身, Intō no Onmi (Embodiment of Lust))
Motif: Lust
Normal Activation: Anything it touches with an attacking will are neutralized. Also dismantles weapon type armaments.
Overdrive Activation: Same as Normal Activation, but affects everything within a 3 km radius.

A mace type armament used by Galileo and Innocentius of K.P.A. Italia. Tori was disappointed that he couldn't recover this when Innocentius fled.

Akēdia Katathlipsē (アーケデイア・カタスリプシ, Akedeia Katasuripushi) (Greek: Ακηδία Κατάθλιψη; Japanese: 嫌気の怠惰, Iyake no Taida)
Motif: Dejection (part of sloth)
Normal Activation: Unknown
Overdrive Activation: Binds the opponents to the part/s of themselves that they dislike about the most.

A longsword-type armament used by Juana of Tres España.

Aspida Phylargia (アスピザ・フィラルジア, Asupiza Firarujia) (Greek: Ασπίδα Φιλαργυρία, Shield of Avarice; Japanese: 拒絶の強欲, Kyozetsu no Gōyoku (Avarice of Rejection))
Motif: Greed
Normal Activation: Defense
Overdrive Activation: Transfer the pain inflicted onto the user into ether

A shield type armament used by Thomas Shakespeare of England. Later recovered by Toussaint Neshinbara.

Phos Hyperēphania (フオス・ハイペリファニア, Fuosu Haiperifania) (Greek: Φως Ὑπερηφανία; Japanese: 傲慢の光臨, Gōman no Kōrin)
Motif: Pride
Normal Activation: The user is invincible as long the user continues to be full of pride upon activation

A twin club type armament used by Louis XIV of Hexagone Francaise. It does not have an Overdrive Activation because the motif was split in two, weakening the power of the weapon.

Phos Kenodoxia (フオス・ケノドクシア, Fuosu Kenodokusia) (Greek: Φως Κενοδοξία; Japanese: 虚栄の降臨, Kyoei no Kōrin)
Motif: Vanity (Part of Pride)
Normal Activation: The user has unlimited defense as long the user continues to be full of vanity upon activation

A backsword type armament used by Terumoto Mouri of Hexagone Francaise. She battles together with her husband Louis XIV due to the nature of their armaments.

Pheugos Gastrimargia (フイオゴス・ガストリマルジア, Fuiogosu Gasutorimarujia) (Greek: Φεύγως Γαστριμαργία, Abandoning Gluttony; Japanese: 飽食の一撃, Hōshoku no Ichigeki)
Motif: Gluttony
Normal Activation: Unknown
Overdrive Activation: Unknown

A crossbow type armament used by Matias of M.H.R.R. While its activations are unknown, its arrows can overload the opponent's armament causing it to explode. Matias destroyed Futayo's Tonbokiri using this.

Maska Orgē (マスカ・オルジィ, Masuka Orujii) (Greek: Μάσκα Οργή; Japanese: 憤怒の閃撃, Funnu no Sengeki)

Motif: Wrath
Normal Activation: Unknown
Overdrive Activation: Unknown

A bow type armament used by Malfa Volekaya of Svet Russia. Its activations are unknown, but the user can create arrows powered by the user's wrath to strike an opponent in the heart. Unlike Pheugos Gastrimargia, which can hit multiple opponents at the same time, Maska Orge can only attack one target at a time. Later on Malfa returned this armament to Horizon.

Ólos Phthonos (オロス・フトノース, Orosu Futonosu) (Greek: Όλος Φθόνος, Entirety of Yearning; Japanese: 焦がれの全域, Kogare no Zen'iki)

Motif: Envy
Normal Activation: Enables the user to use Mortal Sin Armaments at 100% power (Soul Activation)

An OS type armament belongs to Horizon Ariadust of Musashi. Horizon's soul and automaton body are bound to this armament. The model number of this OS is Phtonos-01s (フトノースゼロワンエス), which was shortened to P-01s before Horizon's real identity was revealed.

===== Testament's Apparent Armament =====
Testament's Apparent Armament (聖譜顕装 (テスタメンタ・アルマ), Seifu Kensō; Tesutamenta Aruma)

===== Summit 5 Use Armament =====
Summit 5 Use Armament (五大頂専用武装) are Armaments that can be used only by P. A. Oda's Summit 5.
