= Marfa Boretskaya =

15th-century Russian noblewoman

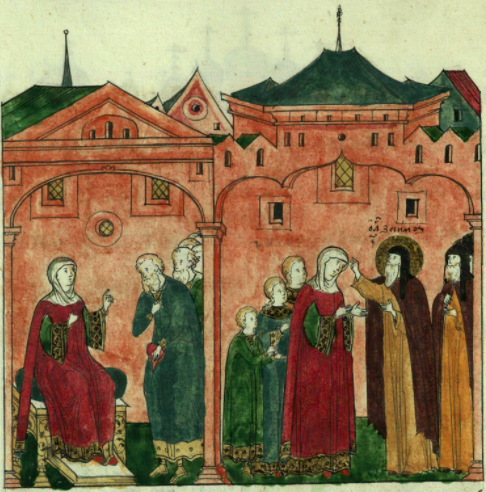
Marfa Boretskaya and Zosimas of Solovki, early 17th-century miniature

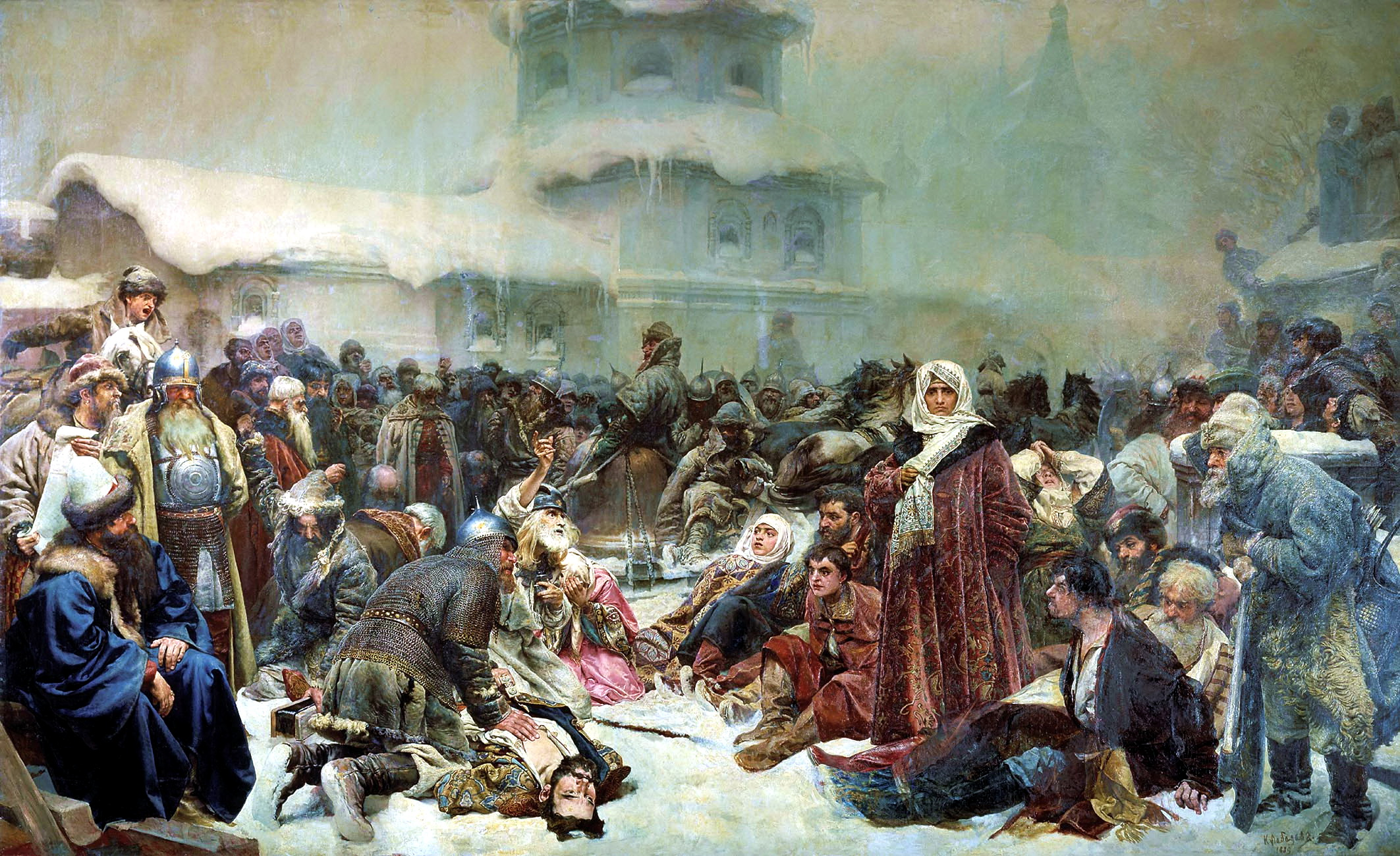
Martha the Mayoress at the Destruction of the Novgorod Veche, by Klavdiy Lebedev, 1889

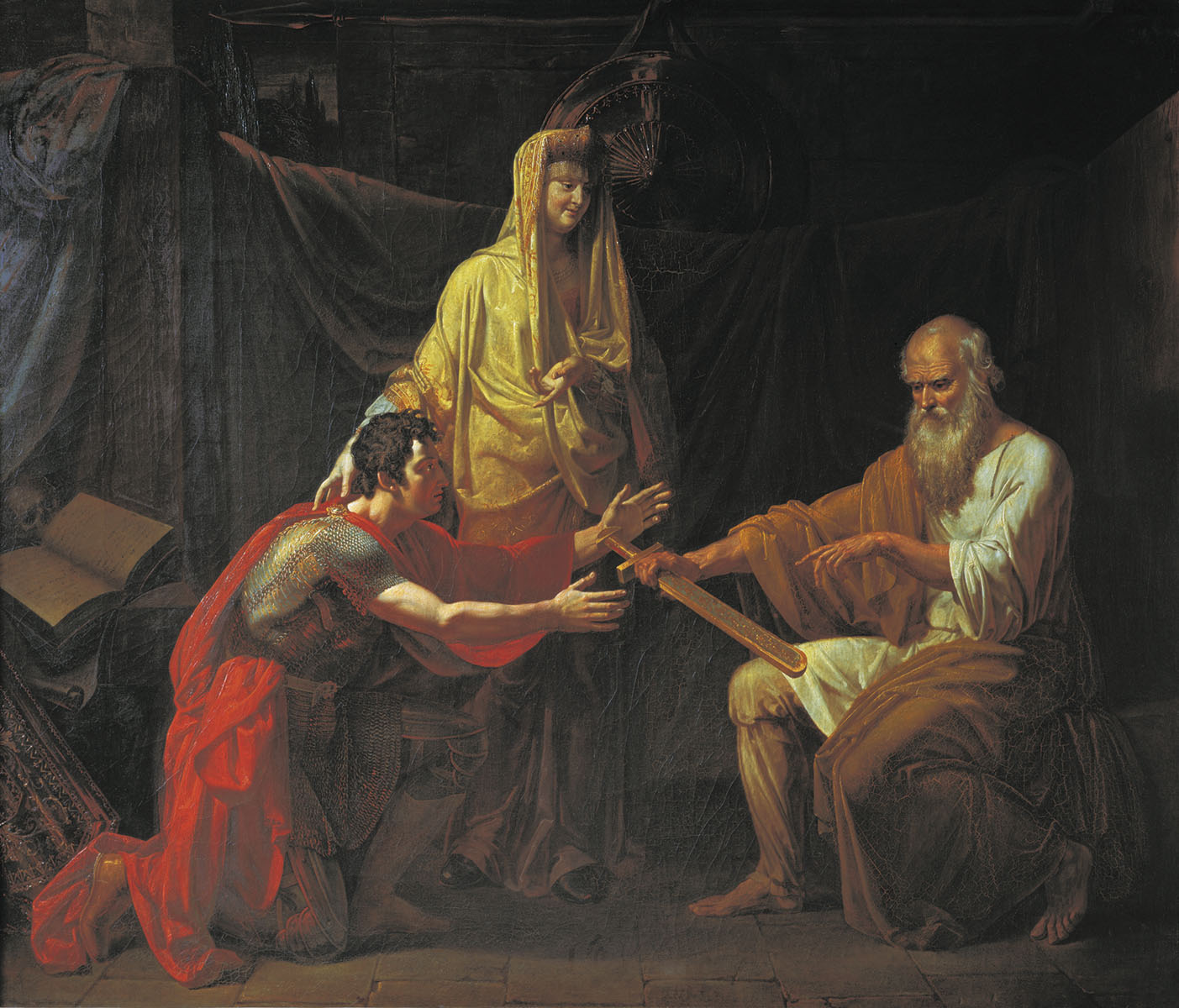
Theodosy Boretsky gives Ratmir's sword to Miroslav, chief of Novgorodians and Martha's selected husband for her daughter Xenia, by Dmitry Ivanov, 1808

Marfa Boretskaya (Russian: Марфа Борецкая), also known as Martha the Mayoress (Russian: Марфа Посадница, romanized: Marfa Posadnitsa), was a Russian businesswoman and noblewoman. She was the wife of Isaak Boretsky, a posadnik of Novgorod in the 15th century.

In the final decades of Novgorod's independence, she played a leading role in the city's politics. According to historical tradition and legend, she led the struggle against Moscow until the city's final annexation by Grand Prince Ivan III in 1478. The incorporation of Novgorod marked the final step in Moscow's process of establishing dominance over the Russian lands.

== Name ==
While she is referred to as a mayoress, this was in no way a formal office. Russians traditionally referred to the wife of certain officials by the feminine equivalent, hence the priest's (pop) wife may be referred to a "priestess" or a general's wife may be referred to a "general-ess" without it meaning that she herself exercised any actual power. In the case of Marfa, she may have been the focal point of the anti-Muscovite faction and had considerable charisma or influence as the matriarch of the clan, but never held actual office in Novgorod as they were confined to the male land-owners. It would be equivalent to the title of first lady in modern English.

== Career ==
Marfa Boretskaya was the daughter of Ivan Loshinsky. She married the boyar (noble) Isaak Boretsky, who served as the posadnik (mayor) of Novgorod until his death in the 1460s. Together they had two sons: Dmitry and Fyodor. Marfa was one of the wealthiest people in Novgorod; she owned extensive land estates which produced products including flax and fur. Because of her husband's influential position, she was known as Marfa the Mayoress. Following her husband's death, she expanded her holdings with the colonization of unsettled lands along the Onega River, leading her to become the third-largest landholder in Novgorod.

Although Novgorod recognized the grand prince of Moscow as the prince of Novgorod, relations between the two cities were damaged due to disputes over autonomy and taxes. Since the 10th century, Novgorod had served as Russia's main port for the Baltic trade, and from the 12th century, it enjoyed autonomy from the Russian grand princes. Novgorodian nobles governed the city on their own and invited outside princes to defend their territories, dismissing them at will. By the 1460s, Marfa was leading the boyar faction that opposed Moscow's policy of centralization.

In 1471, Marfa and her sons, Dmitry and Fyodor, as the last representatives of the anti-Muscovite Boretsky family, attempted to negotiate with Casimir IV Jagiellon the terms of the city's handover to the Grand Duchy of Lithuania, provided that the city's ancient privileges and rights will be retained. They also invited Mikhailo Olelkovich to become city's ruler. On hearing about Marfa's manoeuvres, which violated the earlier Treaty of Yazhelbitsy, (Note: This treaty of 1456 forbade Novgorod from conducting its foreign affairs without the grand prince's approval. See: S. N. Valk, ed., Gramoty Velikogo Novgoroda i Pskova (Moscow and Leningrad: AN SSSR, 1949), Document Nos. 22–23, pp. 39–43.) Ivan III advanced against Novgorod and defeated the Novgorodian volunteer army in the Battle of Shelon. In the wake of this disaster, Marfa's son, Dmitry, who had led the Novgorodian army, was executed on July 24, 1471, at the behest of the grand prince.

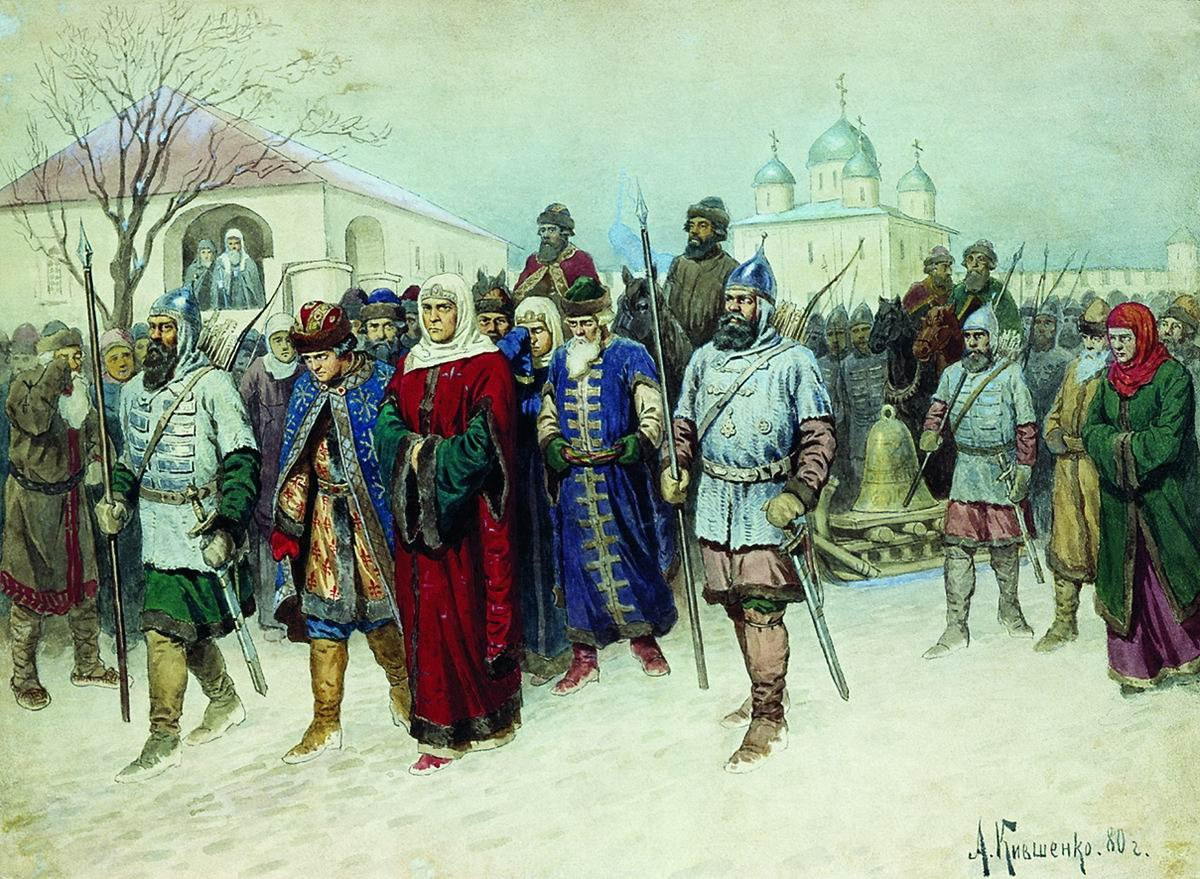
Martha the Mayoress Escorted to Moscow by Aleksey Kivshenko, 1880

Fyodor and Marfa's brother, Ivan, paid homage to the grand prince, but he had them arrested in 1475 and exiled in Murom. Ivan III paid an extended visit to Novgorod during the winter of 1475–1476 and the arrest occurred within a week of his arrival at Gorodishche. The arrest was not explicitly political, as the grand prince responded to complaints from residents who accused a group of nobles, including Marfa's son and brother, of causing a civil disturbance. Following the investigation and hearing, the other nobles were also arrested, including two for explicitly supporting Lithuania, although Marfa's son and brother were not levied charges for pro-Lithuanian sympathies.

Although Marfa continued to rely on Lithuania's support and intrigue against Moscow, Ivan III finally subjugated Novgorod seven years later. Marfa and her grandsons were then taken into custody and escorted to Moscow on February 7, 1478; her lands were confiscated. The incorporation of Novgorod marked the final step in Moscow's process of establishing dominance over the Russian lands.

According to tradition, Marfa was forced to take the veil in Nizhny Novgorod, but Gail Lenhoff argues that her fate after her arrest is uncertain, as are the date and circumstances of her death.

== Personal life ==
Little is known of Marfa's personal life. She was widowed at some time in the 1460s and remained one of the wealthiest Novgorodian landowners (based on the Pistsovye Knigi or land cadasters compiled by Muscovite officials beginning in the 1490s) until Ivan III's confiscations of land in the 1470s and 1480s. It was probably to defend her wealth that she opposed the Muscovite grand princes who had sought to take over Novgorodian estates going back into the late 14th century.

== Assessment and memory ==
According to the 15th-century Sofia Chronicle, Marfa is identified as the "evil woman" who was responsible for the alliance with Lithuania. The Chronicle alleges that she intended to marry a Lithuanian noble and to place Novgorod under Lithuanian suzerainty. It also claims that she conspired with a steward to the archbishop of Novgorod to place the diocese of Novgorod under the jurisdiction of the Uniate church. Although these claims are not found in other sources, this account in the Chronicle became the basis of her reputation.

More recent research argues that Marfa was scapegoated by Archbishop Feofil of Novgorod (r. 1470–1480) to disguise his role in Novgorod's failure to fulfill its treaty obligations. The story of Marfa's duplicitous behavior toward the grand prince was apparently first written down in the archbishop's scriptorium in Novgorod in the mid-to-late 1470s.

Marfa's tragic career and struggle for the republican government won her a good deal of sympathy and attention from Russian writers and historians, especially those with a romantic streak. She was fictionalized in Nikolai Karamzin's short novel Martha the Mayoress, or the Fall of Novgorod as well as in a book by Fedotov entitled Marfa Posadnitsa. Karamzin in particular referred to her as the "supreme republican woman". Her career fascinated Pushkin who dedicated his 1830 essay to her. Sergey Esenin wrote a historical poem about Marfa the Mayoress in 1914.

Marfa's statue is part of the Millennium of Russia monument in Novgorod.

== Sources ==
- Clements, Barbara Evans (2012). A History of Women in Russia: From Earliest Times to the Present. Indiana University Press. ISBN 978-0-253-00104-7.
- Lenhoff, Gail; Martin, Janet (2000). "Marfa Boretskaia, Posadnitsa of Novgorod: A Reconsideration of Her Legend and Her Life". Slavic Review. 59 (2): 343–368. doi:10.2307/2697056. ISSN 0037-6779.
- Martin, Janet (2008). "Boretskaia, Marfa". In Smith, Bonnie G. (ed.). The Oxford Encyclopedia of Women in World History. Oxford University Press. p. 249. ISBN 978-0-19-514890-9.
- Paul, Michael C (March 2007). "Secular Power and the Archbishops of Novgorod before the Muscovite Conquest". Kritika: Explorations in Russian and Eurasian History. 8 (2): 231–270. doi:10.1353/kri.2007.0020.
- Pushkareva, Natalia (16 September 2016) [1997]. Women in Russian History: From the Tenth to the Twentieth Century. Routledge. ISBN 978-1-315-48043-5.
