= Klavdy Lebedev =

Russian painter (1852–1916)

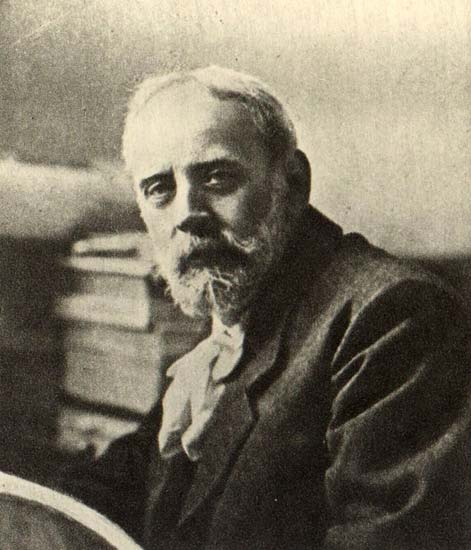
- Born: October 16, 1852
- Died: September 21, 1916 (aged 63); Moscow, Moscow Governorate, Russian Empire
- Education: Member Academy of Arts (1897); Full Member Academy of Arts (1906)
- Alma mater: Stroganov Moscow State Academy of Arts and Industry; Moscow School of Painting, Sculpture and Architecture
- Known for: Painting
- Movement: Peredvizhniki

Klavdy Vasilyevich Lebedev (Russian: Клавдий Васильевич Лебедев; 28 October [O.S. 16 October] 1852 – 21 September [O.S. 8 September] 1916) was a Russian painter. He was a member of the Peredvizhniki movement.

== Biography ==
Lebedev came from a peasant family, studied at the Stroganov Moscow State Academy of Arts and Industry and the Moscow School of Painting, Sculpture and Architecture under Vasily Perov and Evgraf Sorokin. From 1890 he taught there.

In 1881 he was awarded a large silver medal of the Imperial Academy of Arts and received the title of a class artist. Member of The Wanderers group (1891).

The title of academician of painting of the Imperial Academy of Arts (1897). The title of full member of the Academy of Arts (1906).

Consisted full-time professor of the Academy of Arts (1894–1898).

== Work ==
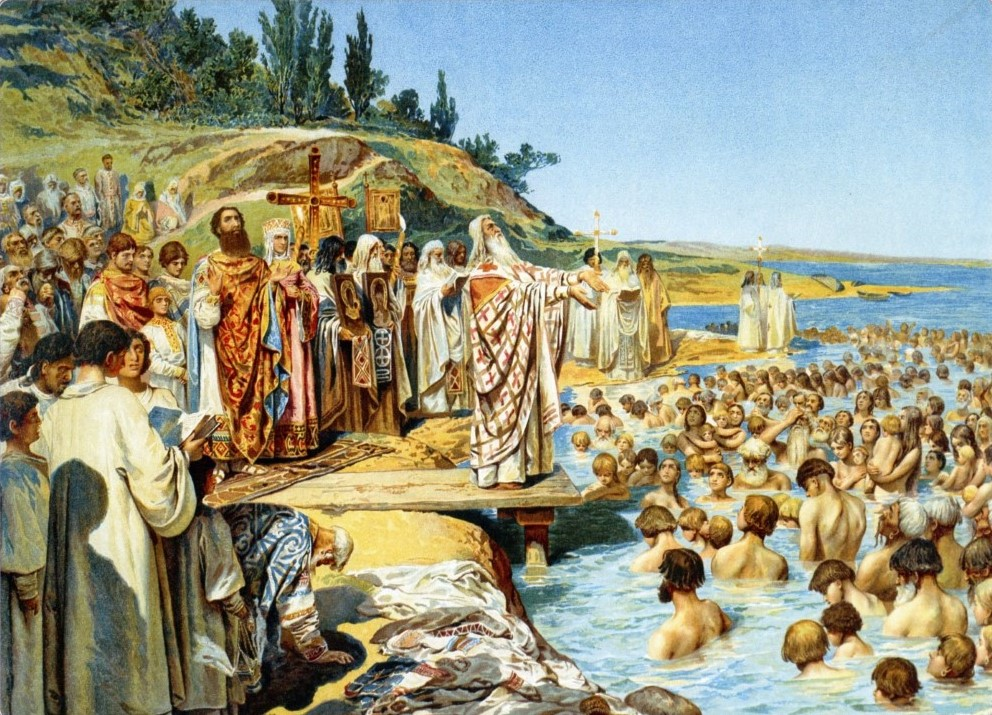
Baptism of Kiev

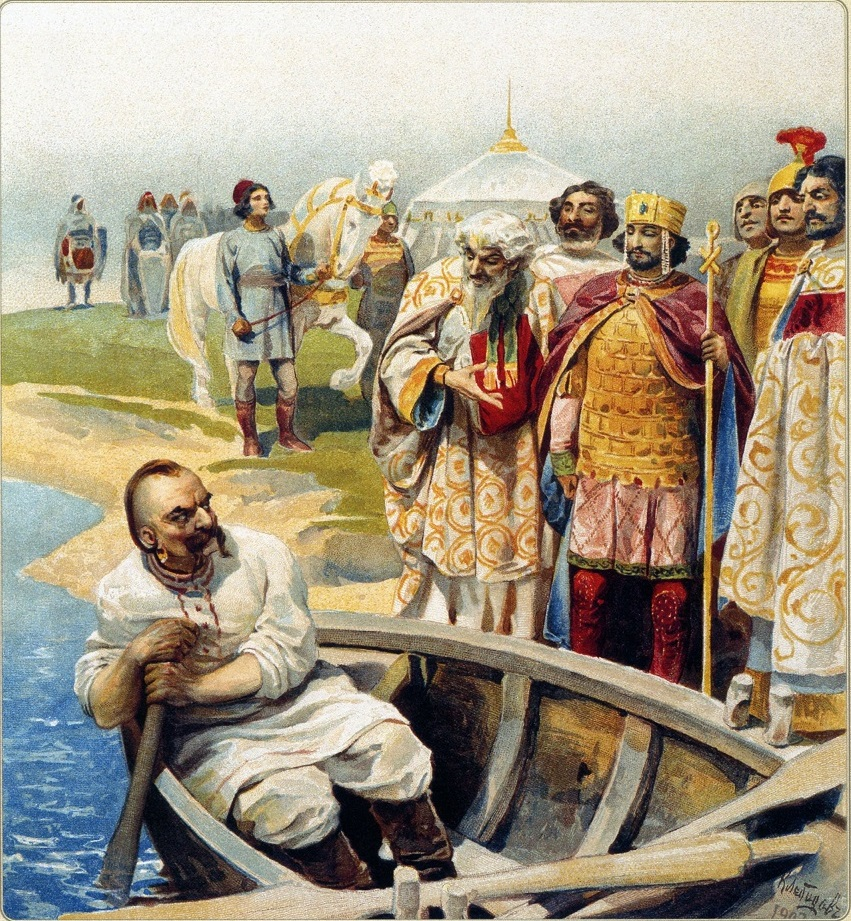
Svyatoslav's meeting with Emperor John, as described by Leo the Deacon

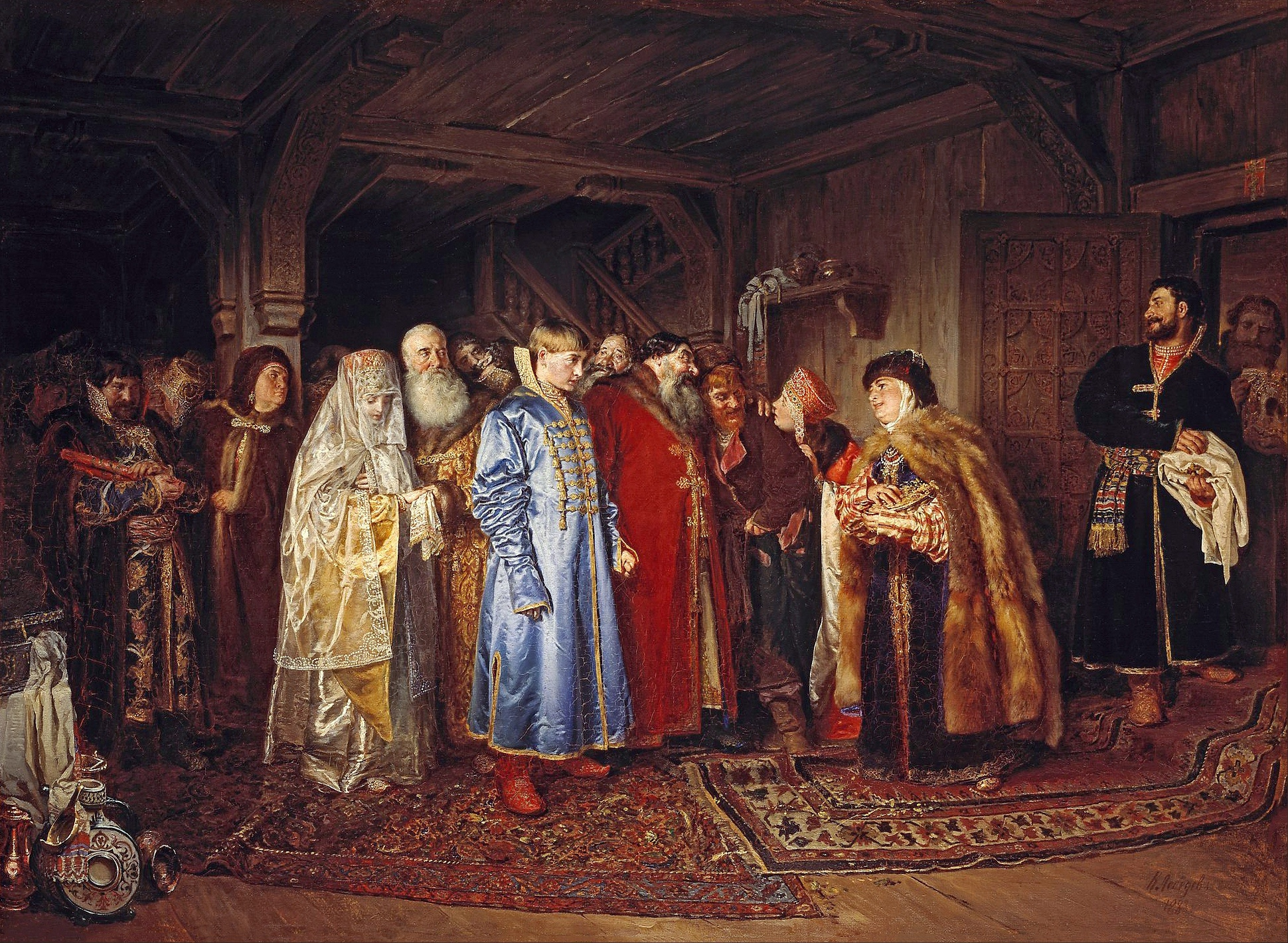
Boyar wedding (1883)

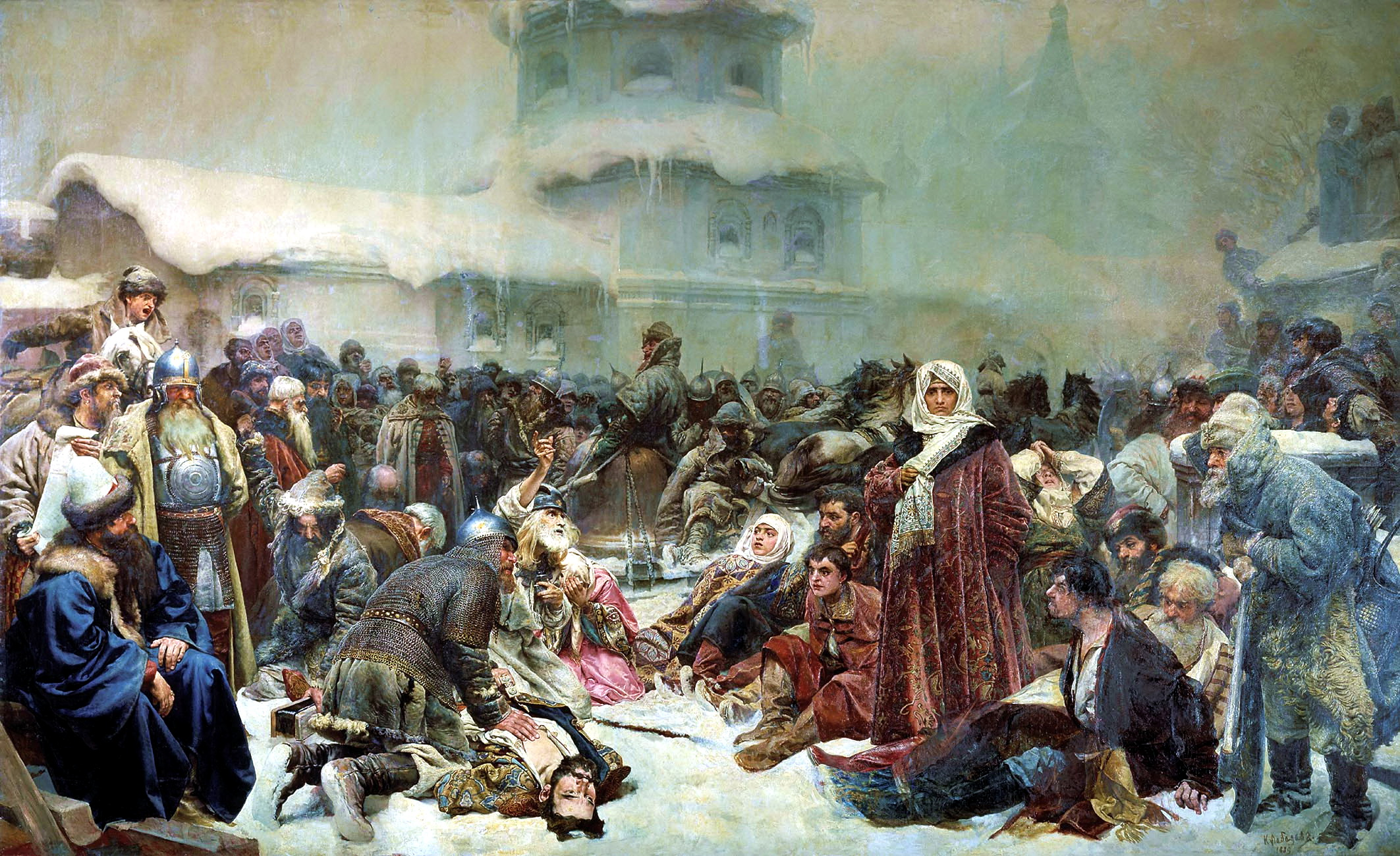
Martha the Mayoress at the Destruction of the Novgorod Veche (1889)

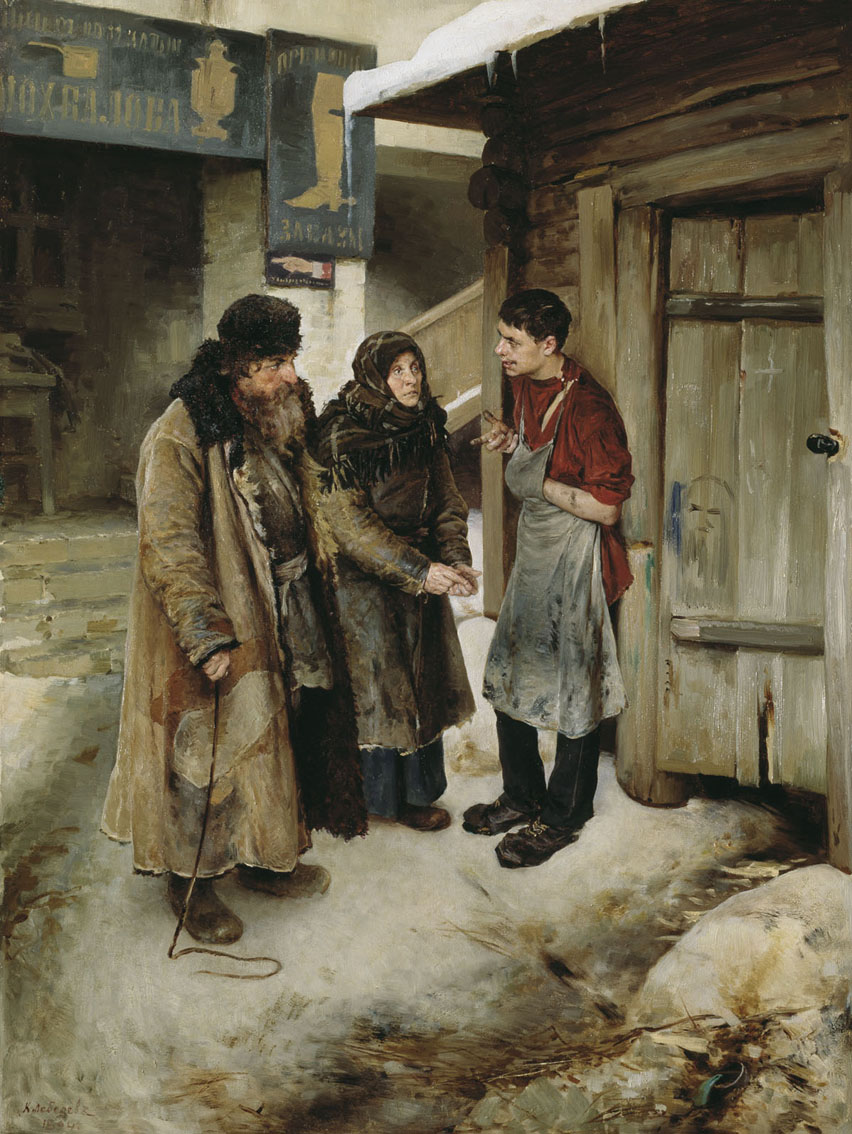
To son (1894)

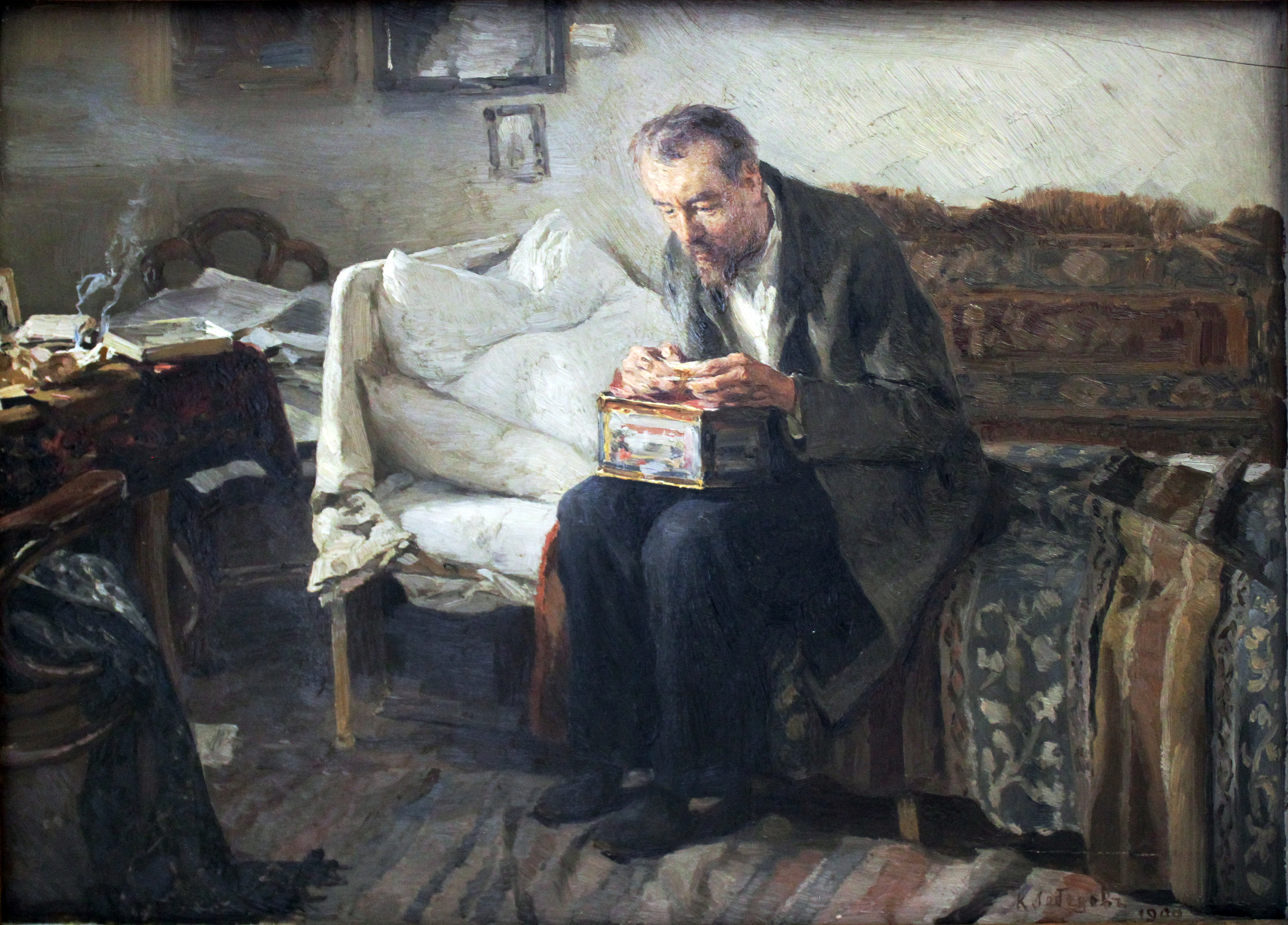
Old bachelor (1900)

== Sources ==
- С. Н. Кондаков (1915). Юбилейный справочник Императорской Академии художеств. 1764-1914 (in Russian). Vol. 2. p. 111.
