= Dmitry Boretsky =

Russian noble (died 1471)

Posadnik of Novgorod

Personal details
- Died: 24 July 1471
- Parents: Isaak Boretsky (father); Marfa Boretskaya (mother)

Military service
- Battles/wars: Battle of Shelon

Dmitry Isaakovich Boretsky (Russian: Дмитрий Исаакович Борецкий; died 24 July 1471) was a Russian nobleman who served as a posadnik (mayor) of Novgorod in 1471. He was the eldest of the two sons of Isaak Boretsky by his wife Marfa Boretskaya.

== Life ==
Dmitry Isaakovich Boretsky was the eldest of the two sons of Isaak Boretsky by his wife Marfa Boretskaya (née Loshinskaya).

Under the influence of his mother, he and his brother Fyodor advocated for the subjugation of Novgorod to Polish king Casimir IV. He was elected posadnik (mayor) in February 1471. Despite this, he gained the favor of Grand Prince Ivan III and was elevated to the rank of boyar in Moscow. However, with the outbreak of war between Novgorod and Moscow, he led the Novgorodian army at the Battle of Shelon on 14 July 1471. He was captured and sent to Moscow, where he was tried and executed on 24 July.

== Sources ==
- "Борецкие" . Brockhaus and Efron Encyclopedic Dictionary (in Russian). 1906.
- Boguslavsky, Vladimir V.; Kuksina, Elena I. (2001). "Борецкий, Дмитрий Исаакович". Славянская энциклопедия. Киевская Русь — Московия. Т. 1: А–М (in Russian). Vol. 1. Moskva: ОЛМА Медиа Групп. p. 98. ISBN 9785224022502.
- Ikonnikov, V. (1908). "Борецкий, Дмитрий Исаакович". Русский биографический словарь. Т. 3: Бетанкур — Бякстер. Русский биографический словарь. pp. 221–222.
- Kuchkin, V. A. (1 September 2022). "The First Campaign of Ivan III to Novgorod in 1471". Herald of the Russian Academy of Sciences. 92 (5): S355–S366. doi:10.1134/S1019331622110089. ISSN 1555-6492.
- Nesin, M. A. (2017). "Шелонская битва 1471". In Kravets, S. L. (ed.). Большая российская энциклопедия. Том 34: Хвойка — Шервинский (in Russian). Большая российская энциклопедия. pp. 790–791. ISBN 978-5-85270-372-9. Archived from the original on 26 May 2026.
