= Isaak Boretsky =

Russian noble (died after 1456)

Posadnik of Novgorod

Personal details
- Died: after 1456
- Spouse: Marfa Boretskaya
- Children: 2, including Dmitry

Isaak Andreyevich Boretsky (Russian: Исаак Андреевич Борецкий; died after 1456) was a Russian nobleman who served as a posadnik (mayor) of Novgorod in the 15th century.

== Life ==
Isaak Boretsky was born into a noble family descended from Yury Mishinich (d. 1316), according to the historian Valentin Yanin. The family owned the volost (rural district) of Borok, from which it derived its surname. He is first mentioned in 1417 defending that volost from raiders who had arrived from Vyatka and Ustyug.

He was elected as posadnik (mayor) of Novgorod sometime before 1428. A treaty was signed in 1439, according to which Boretsky forbade German merchants from leaving Novgorod until Russian merchants were returned from Dorpat and Reval. As a result of tensions with the Hanseatic League, the Novgorodian authorities feared that releasing foreign merchants prematurely would lead to the arrest of more Russian merchants.

In 1453, Boretsky had a secret conversation with the deacon Stefan Bradaty, a confidant of Grand Prince Vasily II who had arrived from Moscow. Stefan brought poison to Boretsky, who then bribed one of Dmitry Shemyaka's cooks to put it in his food. As a result, Dmitry died a few days later.

He is last mentioned in a 1456 charter by Vasily II addressed to Novgorodian governors, which refers to complaints by his peasants from Ustyug about goods taken from them on the Dvina by the stewards of the boyars Mikhail Tucha and Isaak Boretsky. Vasily II insisted that those who had suffered "from robbery" be compensated, and likely soon after this, Boretsky died. Yanin believed he died in the 1460s.

== Family ==
He married Marfa. It is not known when they married. Together, they had two sons: Dmitry and Fyodor. Dmitry later became posadnik in February 1471.

== Sources ==
- "Борецкие" . Brockhaus and Efron Encyclopedic Dictionary (in Russian). 1906.
- Kuchkin, V. A. (1 September 2022). "The First Campaign of Ivan III to Novgorod in 1471". Herald of the Russian Academy of Sciences. 92 (5): S355–S366. doi:10.1134/S1019331622110089. ISSN 1555-6492.
- Lenhoff, Gail; Martin, Janet (2000). "Marfa Boretskaia, Posadnitsa of Novgorod: A Reconsideration of Her Legend and Her Life". Slavic Review. 59 (2): 343–368. doi:10.2307/2697056. ISSN 0037-6779.
- Lukin, P. V.; Polekhov, S. V. (1 September 2022). "Why Did Lord Novgorod the Great Fall? The Novgorod Republic and Its Neighbors in 1470–1471". Herald of the Russian Academy of Sciences. 92 (5): S367–S384. doi:10.1134/S1019331622110090. ISSN 1555-6492.
- Rudakov, Vasily Yegorovich (1908). "Борецкий, Исаак Андреевич". Русский биографический словарь. Т. 3: Бетанкур — Бякстер. Русский биографический словарь. pp. 222–223.
