= Vasily Kazimer =

Russian noble (died after 1481)

Posadnik of Novgorod

Personal details
- Died: after 1481

Military service
- Battles/wars: Battle of Shelon

Vasily Aleksandrovich Kazimer (Note: Also referred to as Vasily Fyodorovich Kazimer.) (Russian: Василий Александрович Казимер; died after 1481) was a Russian nobleman who served as a posadnik (mayor) of Novgorod in the 1470s.

== Life ==
Vasily Kazimer is first mentioned in Russian chronicles under the year 1456 as one of the Novgorodians who distinguished themselves at the Battle of Rusa. He is next mentioned in 1459 as a tysyatsky (chiliarch), when he accompanied the archbishop of Novgorod to Moscow. He is mentioned as a posadnik (mayor) in 1471, 1476, and 1478. According to the historian Valentin Yanin, he could not have become a posadnik earlier than 1459. Vasily's brother, Yakov Korobov, is also mentioned as a posadnik during this period.

He was one of the leaders of the Novgorodian army at the Battle of Shelon on 14 July 1471. Following his capture, he was sent to Kolomna. However, Vasily was soon released following the signing of the Treaty of Korostyn at the request of Archbishop Feofil of Novgorod. On 16 November 1475, he participated in the reception of Grand Prince Ivan III. According to the chronicles of Pskov, he was one of the nobles arrested by Ivan III; however, Yanin says that this is erroneous as the Sofia First Chronicle, which describes in detail the escort of the nobles, does not mention his name.

As Ivan III proceeded to complete the annexation of Novgorod in 1478, Vasily met him outside the city and presented him with gifts while also acting as a mediator. However, in 1481, Ivan III decided to exile him along with other Novgorodian nobles.

== Sources ==
- "Казимер, Василий Федорович" . Brockhaus and Efron Encyclopedic Dictionary (in Russian). 1906.
- Boguslavsky, Vladimir V.; Kuksina, Elena I. (2001). "Казимер, Василий Федорович". Славянская энциклопедия. Киевская Русь — Московия. Т. 1: А–М (in Russian). Vol. 1. Moskva: ОЛМА Медиа Групп. p. 525. ISBN 9785224022502.
- Ekzemplyarsky, Andrey V. (1897). "Казимер, Василий Федорович". Русский биографический словарь. Т. 8: Ибак — Ключарев. Русский биографический словарь. pp. 383–384.
- Nesin, M. A. (2017). "Шелонская битва 1471". In Kravets, S. L. (ed.). Большая российская энциклопедия. Том 34: Хвойка — Шервинский (in Russian). Большая российская энциклопедия. pp. 790–791. ISBN 978-5-85270-372-9. Archived from the original on 26 May 2026.
- Yanin, Valentin L. (2003). Новгородские посадники [Novgorodian posadniks] (in Russian). Языки славянской культуры. ISBN 978-5-94457-106-9.
