= Treaty of Yazhelbitsy =

1456 treaty between Moscow and Novgorod

The Treaty of Yazhelbitsy (Russian: Яжелбицкий мирный договор) was a peace treaty signed by Vasili II, Grand Prince of Moscow and Vladimir, and the government of Novgorod the Great in the village of Yazhelbitsy in February 1456. This treaty was a significant setback for Novgorod, which would culminate, almost quarter of a century later, in the city being brought under the direct control of the Muscovite Grand Prince in 1478.

In 1456, the Novgorodians sustained a crushing defeat at the hands of the Muscovite forces at the end of a long succession struggle in which Grand Prince Vasily II triumphed over his cousin, Prince Dmitry Shemyaka; Shemyaka himself had been poisoned in Novgorod in 1453 probably at the hands of grand princely agents, although some scholars suggest that Archbishop Evfimy II (1429–1458) had him poisoned as a liability to Novgorodian interests. Shemyaka's widow had subsequently fled to the Grand Duchy of Lithuania with her son, Ivan Dmitriyevich ("Ivan, son of Dmitry").

Following the defeat, the citizens of Novgorod convened a veche and, according to the sources, turned to Archbishop Evfimy II with a request that he travel to the grand prince’s headquarters in Yazhelbitsy and ask what his peace terms were. After several days of intense negotiations, the parties signed the Treaty of Yazhelbitsy. The text of the treaty survived in two copies, one signed by Muscovy and the other one by Novgorod. Today, both of these documents may be found in the Russian National Library in Saint Petersburg. The texts of the treaty, however, are not identical in each of the two copies.

The personal involvement of Evfimii II is uncertain. According to the end of the Dubrovskii Redaction of the Novgorodian Fourth Chronicle, the archbishop headed the delegation himself, and he blesses the treaty in the preamble of the Novgorodian version; however, he is not mentioned among the delegates in the Muscovite version of the treaty, so it is not clear if he himself took part in the negotiations or merely blessed the undertaking. In any event, the Novgorodians managed to include in this treaty a few customary provisions of non-intervention of the grand prince into Novgorod’s internal affairs, but the text also contained several new provisions. First, Novgorod pledged not to admit Vasili’s enemies within its lands. Second, it was deprived of its right to conduct an independent foreign policy and pass its own legislation. Third, the Grand Prince of Moscow became the court of the highest instance. Fourth, the stamp of the Novgorod veche and the stamps of all the posadniks were replaced with the princely stamp.

After the treaty had been signed, Novgorod’s sovereignty was seriously undermined. Direct Muscovite rule was not yet established, but the independent republican system was seriously curtailed. Vasili II was so content with this treaty that he made some minor territorial concessions to Novgorod. Most of the provisions of the Treaty of Yazhelbitsy were observed by both sides. For example, the Novgorodian stamps (for notarizing documents) were exchanged for Muscovite ones immediately after the conclusion of the treaty. Some provisions, however, were constantly violated, which could be explained by discrepancies and controversial wording in the two different versions of the treaty. The Novgorodians continued to admit the enemies of Muscovy to their city in violation of the provision that they not make peace with the grand prince's enemies. Vasili II (and later his successor Ivan III), in turn violated the articles of the treaty regarding territorial integrity of the republic, adjudicating cases in favor of Muscovite boyars who were seizing Novgorodian estates. Both sides were constantly accusing each other of violating the treaty within the course of the next 15 years. In the end, the discrepancies and controversial wording of the Treaty of Yazhelbitsy led to another confrontation between Moscow and Novgorod in 1471 which further weakened Novgorod. Finally in 1478, Ivan III took direct control of the city.
