= Kormleniye =

System of local administration in medieval Russia

Kormleniye or kormlenie (Russian: кормление, lit. 'feeding') was a system of local administration in medieval Russia whereby a prince's official received food and lodging by the local population during his stay; over time, it was replaced with monetary payments, goods, or equivalent services.

A kormlennaya gramota was a charter given to local government officials, such as the namestnik, who, instead of receiving a salary, were granted income from the local population. Over time, this korm (lit. 'food') consisted of monetary compensation. The system was finally abolished in the mid-16th century, during the reign of Ivan the Terrible (r. 1533–1584); however, the practice still continued in parts of the country in the latter half of the 16th century.

== History ==
One of the oldest extant charters, written by the grand prince of Moscow, Dmitry Donskoy (r. 1359–1389), supports the assumption that the system of kormleniye significantly predates the earliest written evidence and likely originated during the reign of the Kievan grand princes. The system can be traced back to the practice of poliudie as well as later princely tours of cities. The practice whereby representatives of the prince collected money and food from the local population while carrying out one-time or periodically recurring duties is mentioned in the mid-11th century during the reign of Yaroslav the Wise, and was later codified in the Russkaya Pravda. The Pravda mentions kormy ('feedings') to be given to agents of the prince's court and to a town's administrators.

By the 13th and 14th centuries, an entire system of local administration had been created on the basis of kormleniye. During the 14th and 15th centuries, the system became widespread, with the grand prince or various appanage princes sending local officials known as namestniki, who served in place of the prince, and volosteli, who served in rural districts, with the local population required to support them. After the political fragmentation of Russia came to an end, the negative aspects of the system were revealed, and it was seen as an obstacle to centralization. The grand princes of Moscow also began regulating the incomes of those who relied on the system. For instance, a charter could be issued; a kormlennaya gramota allowed local government officials to be granted an income from the local population instead of receiving a salary.

Russian historians have generally dated the end of the kormleniye system to a 1555 or 1556 decree by Ivan the Terrible. Ivan referred to the abuses of the system as an example of the crimes committed by the boyars. In northern Russia, local officials were instead elected. The official record has not been preserved, but the Nikon Chronicle explains in detail how Ivan issued a decree; however, some historians believe that such a decree abolishing the system was never issued and that the Chronicle was simply summarizing the most significant reforms in previous years.

== Sources ==
- "Кормление" . Brockhaus and Efron Encyclopedic Dictionary (in Russian). 1906.
- Feldbrugge, Ferdinand J. M. (2017). A History of Russian Law: From Ancient Times to the Council Code (Ulozhenie) of Tsar Aleksei Mikhailovich of 1649. Brill. ISBN 978-90-04-35214-8.
- Madariaga, Isabel de (25 September 2006). Ivan the Terrible. Yale University Press. ISBN 978-0-300-11973-2.
- Nazarov, V. D. (2010). "Кормление". Большая российская энциклопедия. Том 15: Конго — Крещение (in Russian). Большая российская энциклопедия. pp. 321–322. ISBN 978-5-85270-346-0. Archived from the original on 6 October 2025.
- Nosov, N. E. (1980). "Kormlenie". In Wieczynski, Joseph L. (ed.). The Modern Encyclopedia of Russian and Soviet History. Gulf Breeze: Academic International Press. pp. 189–190.
- Perrie, Maureen (2005). "The Muscovite Monarchy in the Sixteenth Century: "National," "Popular" or "Democratic"?". Cahiers du Monde russe. 46 (1/2): 233–241. ISSN 1252-6576.
