= Buchatsina rural council =

Buchatsina rural council is a lower-level subdivision (selsoviet) of Kapyl district, Minsk region, Belarus. Its administrative center is Buchatsina.
