= Tsimkavichy =

Agrotown in Minsk Region, Belarus

Tsimkavichy Цімкавічы (Belarusian) Тимковичи (Russian)
- Agrotown
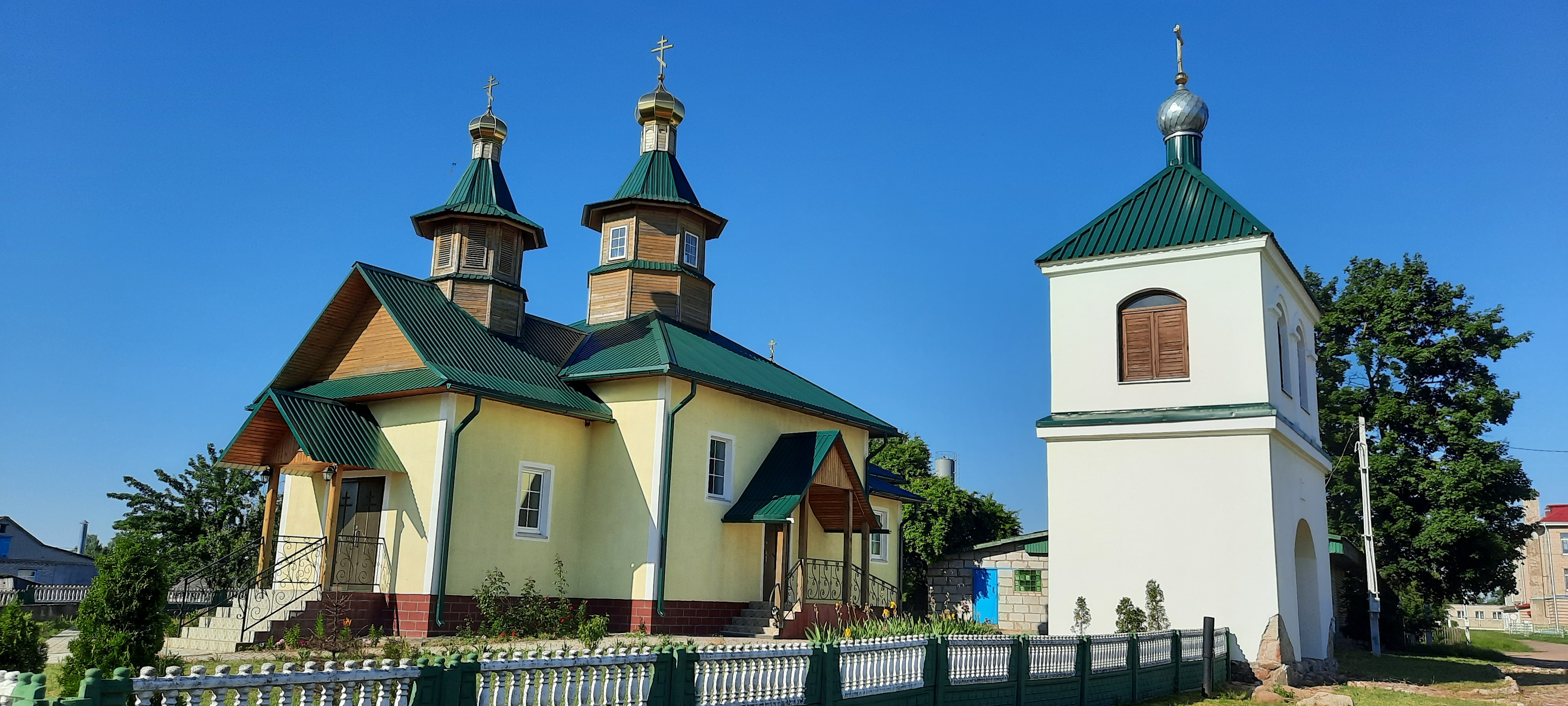

- Location within Belarus
- Coordinates: 53°04′36″N 27°00′34″E
- Country: Belarus
- Region: Minsk Region
- District: Kapyl District

Population (2010)
  - Total: 1,278
- Time zone: UTC+3 (MSK)

Tsimkavichy (Belarusian: Цімкавічы, romanized: Cimkavičy; Russian: Тимковичи, romanized: Timkovichi) is an agrotown in Kapyl District, Minsk Region, Belarus. It serves as the administrative center of Tsimkavichy rural council. It is situated 12 kilometres (7.5 mi) from Kapyl and 132 kilometres (82 mi) from the capital Minsk. In 2003, it had a population of 2,009. In 2010, it had a population of 1,278.
