= Tsimkavichy rural council =

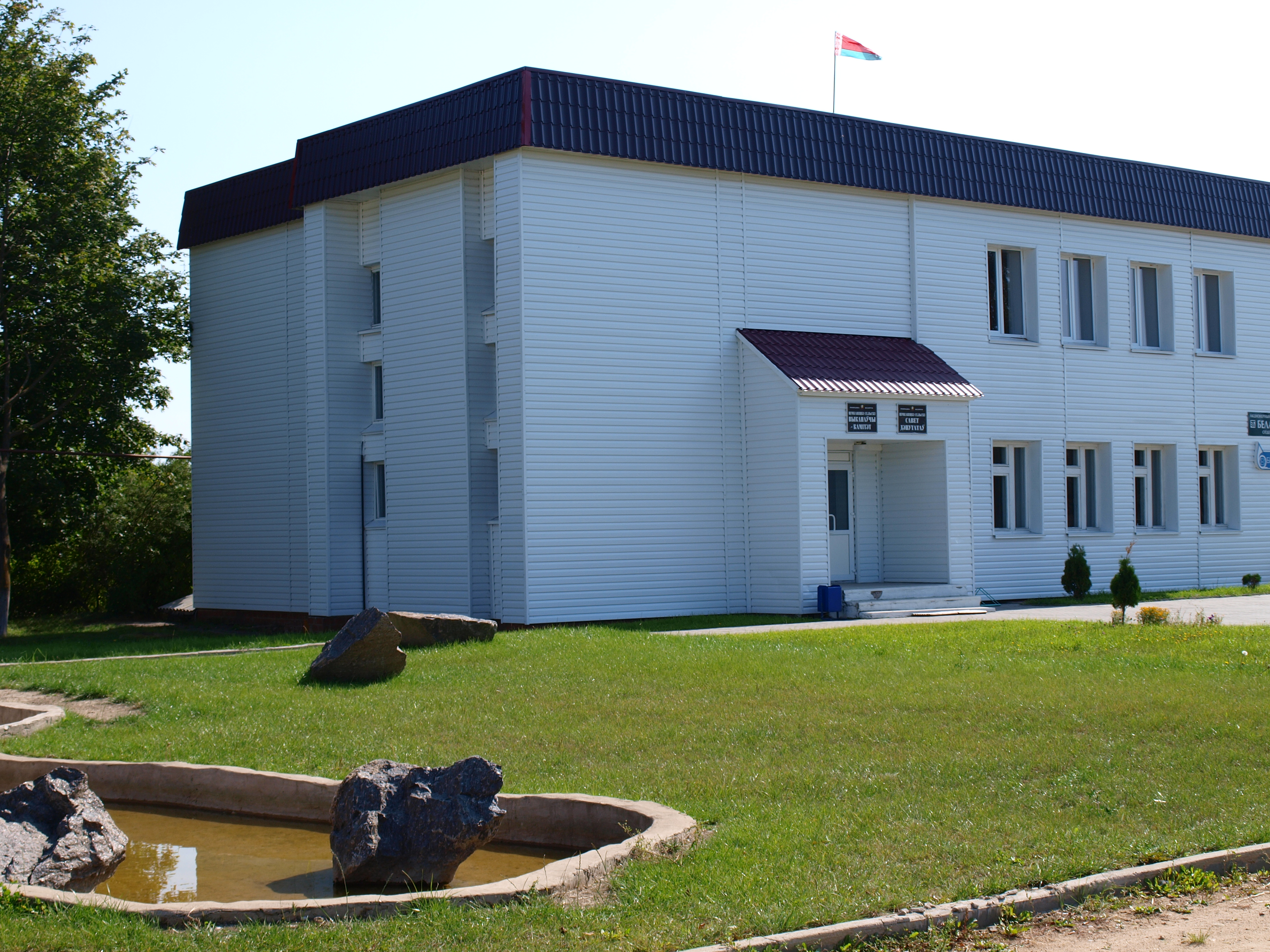
Tsimkavichy village executive committee building

Tsimkavichy rural council is a lower-level subdivision (selsoviet) of Kapyl district, Minsk region, Belarus. Its administrative center is Tsimkavichy.
