= Hrozava =

Agrotown in Minsk Region, Belarus

Hrozava Грозава (Belarusian) Грозово (Russian)
- Agrotown
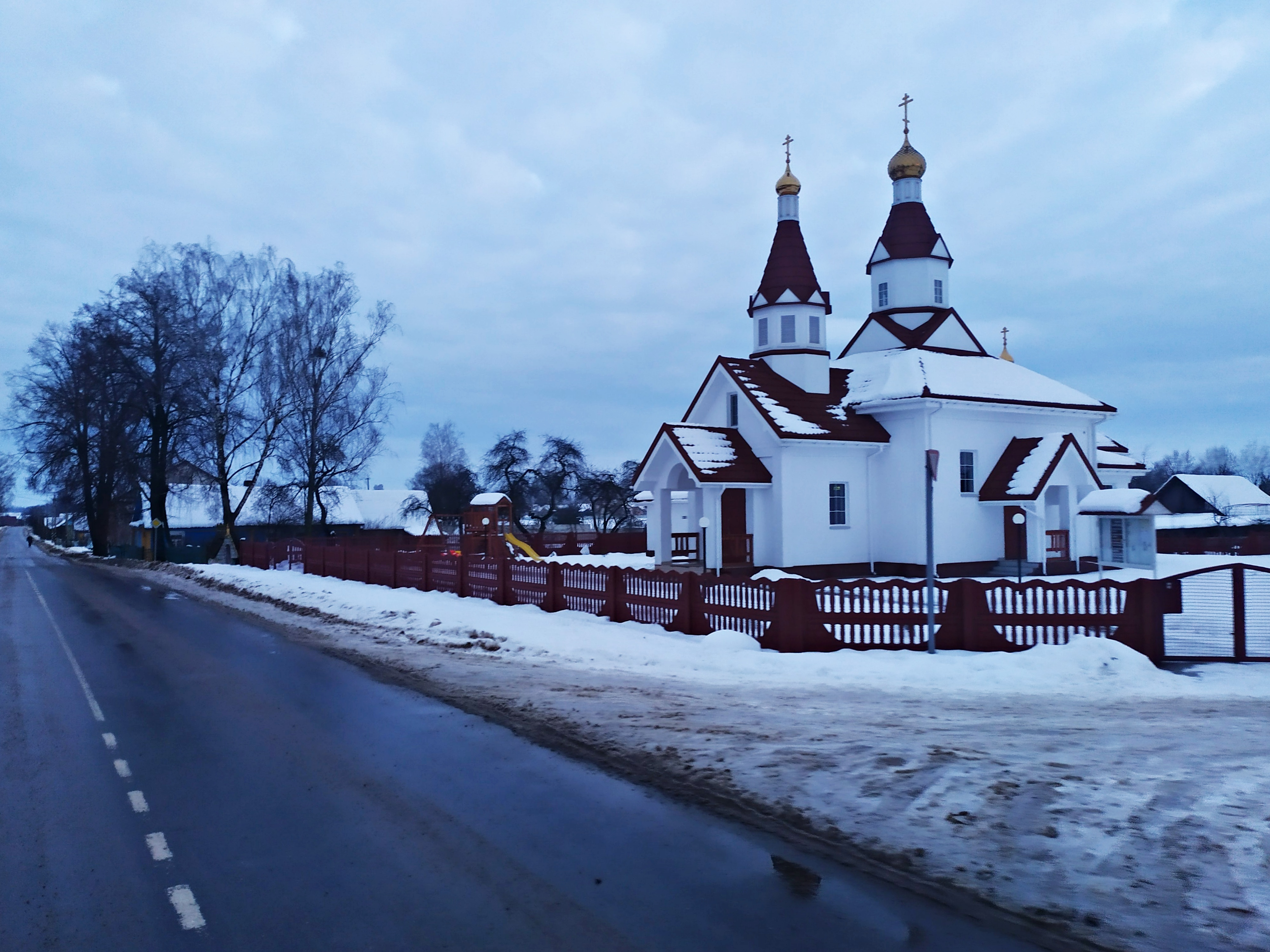

- Location within Belarus
- Coordinates: 53°10′16″N 27°20′03″E
- Country: Belarus
- Region: Minsk Region
- District: Kapyl District

Population (2010)
  - Total: 427
- Time zone: UTC+3 (MSK)

Hrozava (Belarusian: Грозава; Russian: Грозово, romanized: Grozovo), also known as Hrozaw (Belarusian: Грозаў, romanized: Hrozaŭ), is an agrotown in Kapyl District, Minsk Region, Belarus. It serves as the administrative center of Hrozava rural council. It is located 18 kilometres (11 mi) from Kapyl and 102 kilometres (63 mi) from the capital Minsk. In 1997, it had a population of 481. In 2010, it had a population of 427.
