= Slabada-Kuchynka rural council =

Slabada-Kuchynka rural council is a lower-level subdivision (selsoviet) of Kapyl district, Minsk region, Belarus. Its administrative center is Slabada-Kuchynka.
