= Vasil Bykaŭ =

Belarusian writer, human rights activist, and politician (1924–2003)

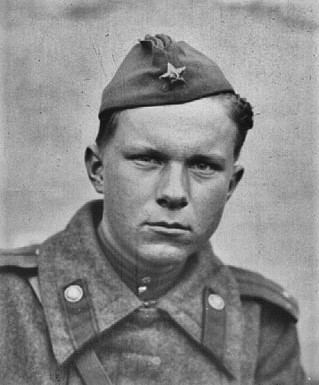
- Bykaŭ in Romania, 1944
- Native name: Васіль Уладзіміравіч Быкаў
- Born: 19 June 1924 Byčki, Byelorussian SSR, Soviet Union (now Belarus)
- Died: 22 June 2003 (aged 79) Minsk, Belarus
- Language: Belarusian, Russian
- Genre: War novel
- Subject: World War II
- Literary movement: Lieutenant prose
- Years active: 1960–2003
- Military career
- Allegiance: Soviet Union
- Branch: Red Army
- Service years: 1941–1945; 1949–1955
- Rank: Junior lieutenant
- Conflicts: World War II

Vasil Uladzimiravič Bykaŭ (also spelled Vasil Bykov; Belarusian: Васі́ль Уладзі́міравіч Бы́каў; Russian: Василь Влади́мирович Быков, romanized: Vasil' Vladimirovich Bykov; 19 June 1924 – 22 June 2003) was a Belarusian dissident and opposition politician, junior lieutenant, and author of novels and novellas about World War II. A significant figure in Soviet and Belarusian literature and civic thought, his work earned him endorsements for the Nobel Prize nomination from, among others, Nobel Prize laureates Joseph Brodsky and Czesław Miłosz.

== Life and career ==
Vasil Bykaŭ was born in the village Byčki, not far from Vitebsk in 1924. In 1941 he was in Ukraine when Operation Barbarossa began. Seventeen-year-old Bykaŭ was drafted into the Red Army, where he was assigned to digging trenches. As the war progressed, he later joined the fight against the Germans, rising to the rank of junior lieutenant. After the war, Bykau was demobilized, but later returned to the Red Army, serving from 1949 to 1955. He then began work as a journalist for the Hrodzenskaya Prauda newspaper. In the same decade his first novellas began to be published, of which the most famous are "The Ordeal", "The Obelisk", "To Go and Not Return", and "To Live Till Sunrise". "The Ordeal" inspired director Larisa Shepitko's film The Ascent, released in 1977 and winner of the Golden Bear award at the 27th Berlin International Film Festival. During and after Perestroika, he participated in the Belarusian Popular Front. From 1990 to 1993, Bykaŭ was the first president of the World Association of Belarusians. In October 1993, he signed the Letter of Forty-Two.

Bykaŭ sharply criticized the regime of Alexander Lukashenko, believing that an alliance with the West, not Russia, would be better for Belarus. He warned against the excesses of Russian imperialism and condemned the First Chechen War, accusing the Kremlin of annihilating "the heroic Chechen people". Bykau considered the increasing Russification policy to be a threat to the Belarusian language. As a result, he was hounded by the state press, and censorship banned the publication of his works.

Bykaŭ headed the organizing committee of an opposition rally that took place on March 24, 1996 during the Minsk Spring. The meeting took place on the eve of the signing of the first integration agreements with Russia.

Bykaŭ lived abroad for several years (first in Finland, then in Germany and the Czech Republic), but returned to his homeland a month before his death in 2003. The memory of his turbulent life and uncompromising stance on the war have only enhanced his reputation at home and abroad ever since.

== Literary work ==
Bykaŭ's literary achievement lies in his sternly realistic, albeit touched by lyricism, depictions of World War II battles, typically with a small number of characters. In the ferociousness of encounter they face moral dilemmas both vis-a-vis their enemies and within their own Soviet world burdened by ideological and political constraints. This approach brought vicious accusations of "false humanism" from some Red Army generals and the Communist Party press. Other reviews praised the uncompromising writing. "Vasil Bykov is a very courageous and uncompromising writer, rather of the Solzhenitsyn stamp," wrote Michael Glenny in Partisan Review in 1972. Bykaŭ was one of the most admired writers in the Soviet Union. In 1980 he was awarded the honorific title of People's Writer of the Byelorussian SSR.

Several of Bykaŭ's novellas are available in English, such as "The Dead Feel No Pain", "The Ordeal", "Wolf Pack" and "Sign of Misfortune". However, most of the translations were done on the basis of Russian rendering. Bykaŭ wrote all of his works in his native Belarusian language, and translated several of them into Russian by himself. Vasil Bykaŭ's status in his home country remains enormous.

== Awards ==
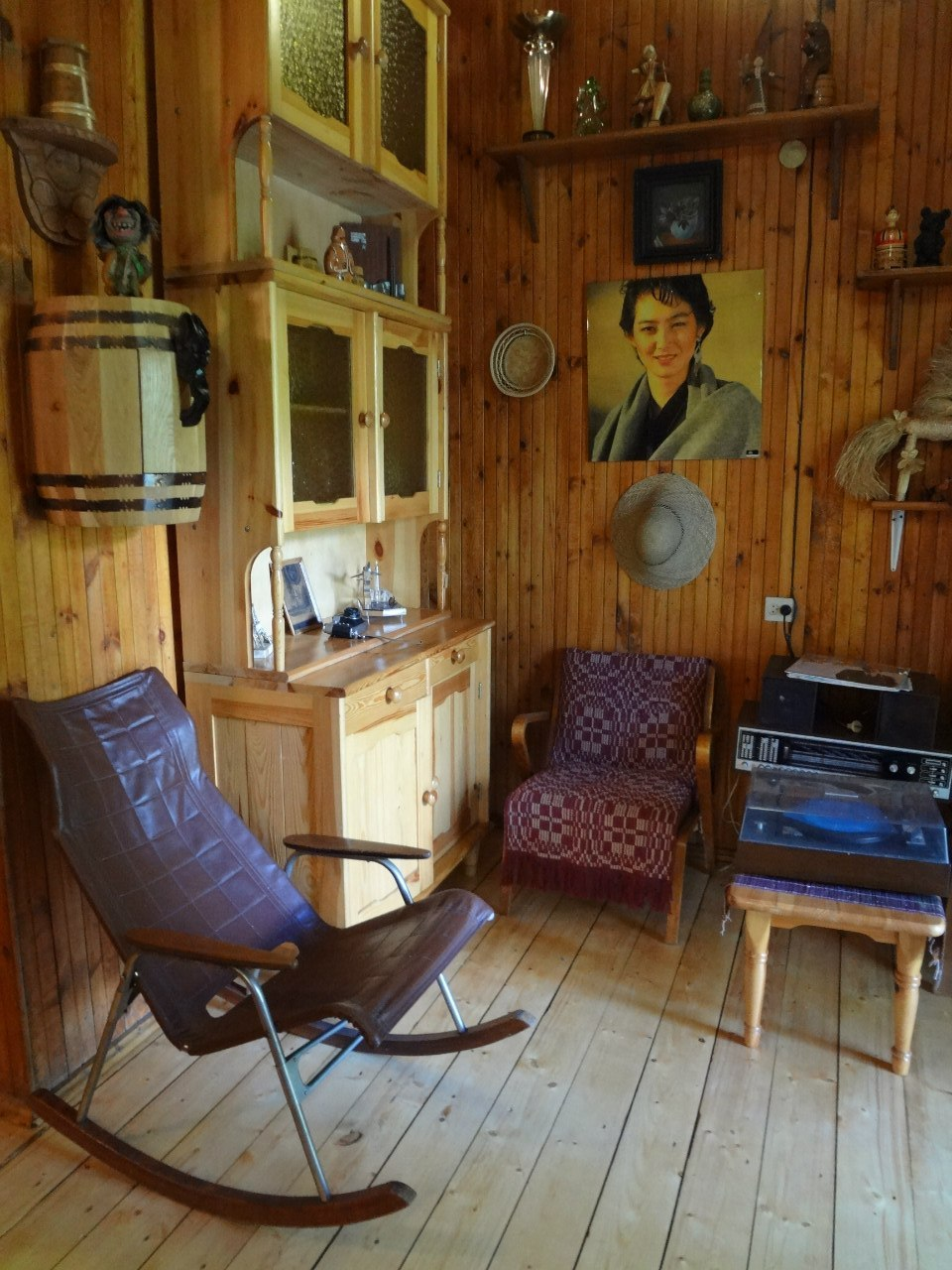
A room at the Bykaŭ Museum

- Order of the Red Star (1944)
- Jakub Kolas State Prize of the Belarusian SSR (for the story "The Third Rocket", 1964)
- Order of the Red Banner of Labour (1974)
- USSR State Prize (for To Live till Sunrise, 1974)
- Jakub Kolas State Prize of the Belarusian SSR (for the story "Wolf Pack", "His battalion", 1978)
- People's Writer of the Belarusian SSR (1980)
- Hero of Socialist Labour (1984)
- Order of Lenin (1984)
- Order of the Patriotic War, 1st class (1985)
- Lenin Prize (for Sign of Misfortune, 1986)
- Order of Friendship of Peoples (1994)
- Order of Francysk Skaryna (Belarus, 1994)
- San-Valentino International Golden Prize (1998).

== Works ==
- 1960 – "Crane's Cry" ("Жураўліны крык")
- 1960 – "Knight Move" ("Ход канём")
- 1962 – "Third Rocket" ("Трэцяя ракета")
- 1964 – "The Alpine Ballad" ("Альпійская балада")
- 1965 – "One Night" ("Адна ноч")
- 1970 – "The Ordeal" ("Ліквідацыя" ["Liquidation"]; originally published as "Сотнікаў" ["Sotnikov"])
- 1971 – "The Obelisk" ("Абеліск")
- 1973 – "To Live Till Sunrise" ("Дажыць да світання")
- 1974 – "Wolf Pack" ("Воўчая зграя")
- 1975 – "His Battalion" ("Яго батальён")
- 1978 – "To Go and Not Return" ("Пайсці і не вярнуцца")
- 1983 – "Sign of Misfortune" ("Знак бяды")
- 1989 – "In the Fog" ("У тумане")
- 1994 – "On Black Slash-and-Burn Fields"
  Na Chornykh Lyadakh drama film (1995) was based on it
- 1997 – "The Wall" ("Сцяна")
- 2003 – "The Long Road Home" ("Доўгая дарога да дому")

== Legacy ==
Streets in the cities of Zhdanovichi, Zhlobin, Zhytkavichy, Luninyets, Lyelchytsy, Mogilev, Smalyavichy, Fanipal, Zakabluki, and Velika Severynka (Ukraine) are named after the writer.

On September 9, 2020, a memorial plaque to Bykaŭ was unveiled in Minsk. Further memorial plaques can be found in Vitebsk and the Ukrainian village of Velika Severynka.

On June 15, 2021, a monument to Vasil Bykaŭ was erected in Ushachy, next to a monument to his friend Ryhor Baradulin.

In September 2025, it was announced that, on the initiative of the Belarusian community RAZAM, a commemorative plaque for Bykaŭ would be erected in Frankfurt am Main.

== Personal life ==
First wife - Nadzeya Kulahina (1923—1982), schoolteacher. The couple had two sons.

Second wife (from 1978) — Iryna Suvorava (1927—2026), staff member at the Hrodzenskaya Prauda newspaper.

== See also ==
- The Wall
- In the Fog, 2012 film based on Bykaŭ's 1989 story of the same name
