= Bystrytsa, Kapyl district =

Agrotown in Minsk Region, Belarus

Bystrytsa Быстрыца (Belarusian) Быстрица (Russian)
- Agrotown
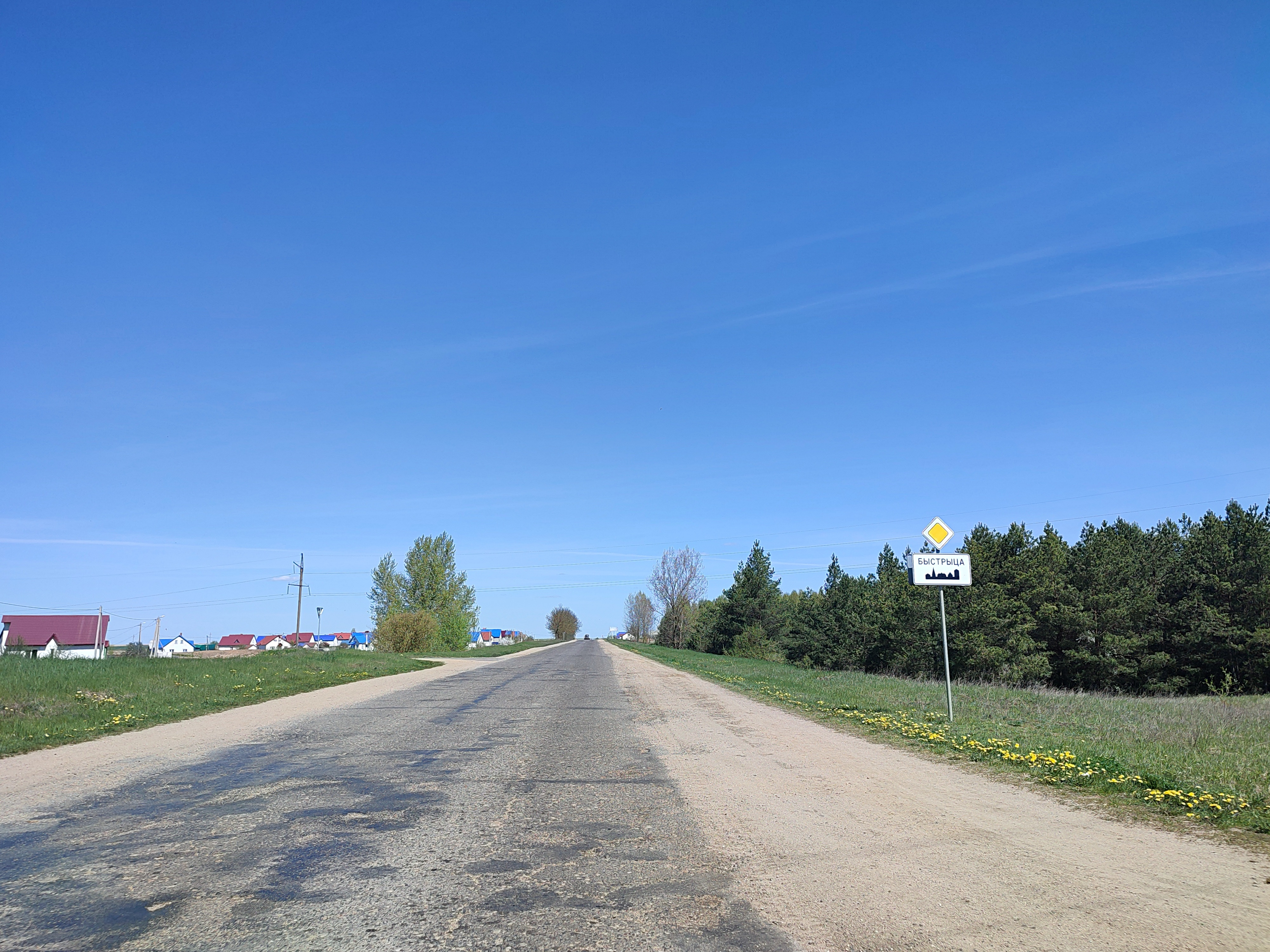

- Location within Belarus
- Coordinates: 53°02′02″N 27°04′40″E
- Country: Belarus
- Region: Minsk Region
- District: Kapyl District
- Time zone: UTC+3 (MSK)

Bystrytsa (Belarusian: Быстрыца, romanized: Bystryca; Russian: Быстрица, romanized: Bystritsa) is an agrotown in Kapyl District, Minsk Region, Belarus. It serves as the administrative center of Blyewchytsy rural council.

== History ==
In 2008, it received the status of agrotown and became the administrative center of Blyewchytsy rural council.
