= Doktaravichy rural council =

Doktaravichy rural council is a lower-level subdivision (selsoviet) of Kapyl district, Minsk region, Belarus. Its administrative center is Novyya Doktaravichy.
