= Patsyeyki rural council =

Patsyeyki rural council is a lower-level subdivision (selsoviet) of Kapyl district, Minsk region, Belarus. Its administrative center is Patsyeyki.
