= Kapyl rural council =

Kapyl rural council is a lower-level subdivision (selsoviet) of Kapyl district, Minsk region, Belarus. Its administrative center is Kapyl.
