= Buchatsina =

Village in Minsk Region, Belarus

Buchatsina Бучаціна (Belarusian) Бучатино (Russian)
- Village
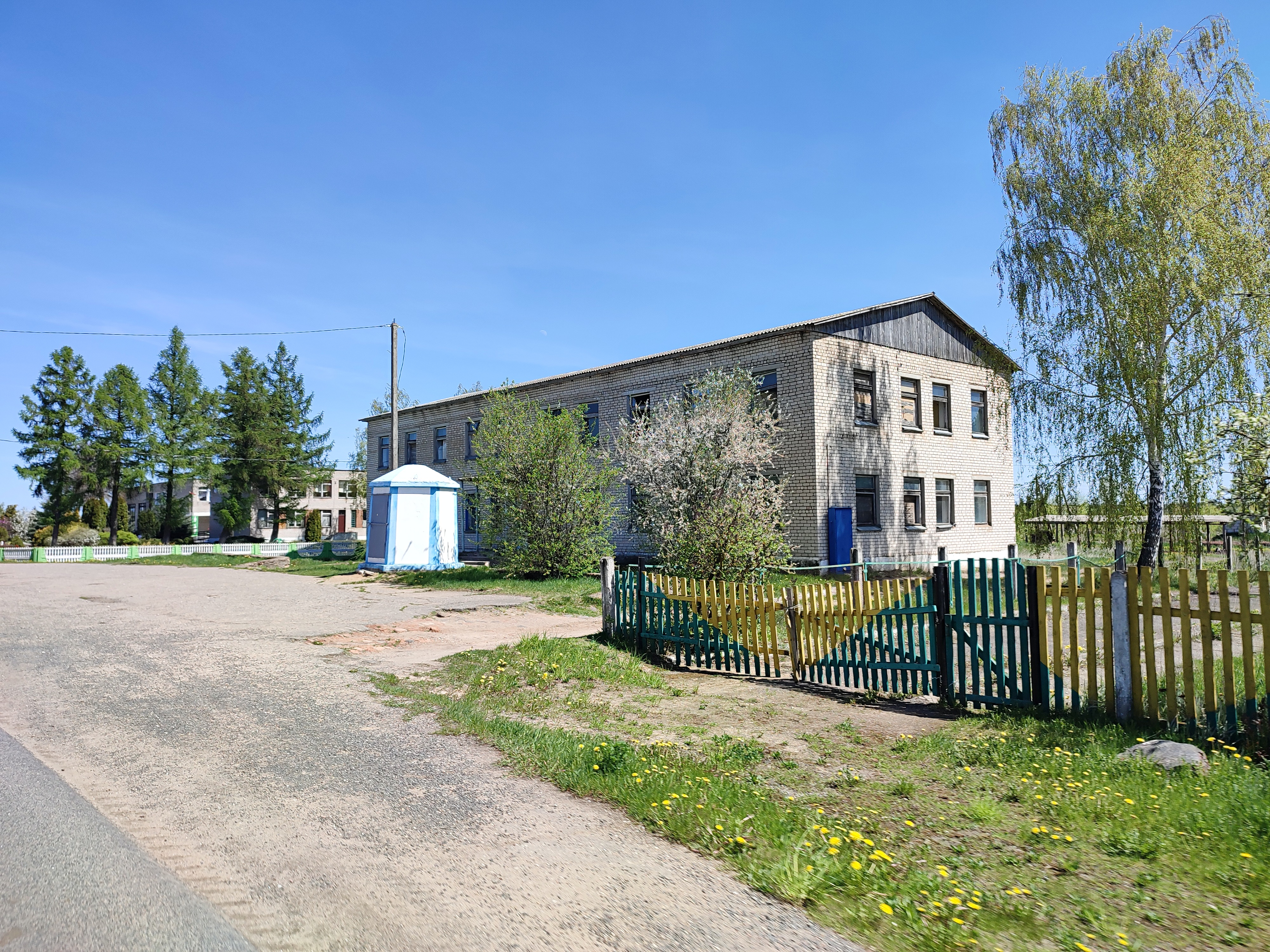

- Location within Belarus
- Coordinates: 52°54′48″N 27°05′00″E
- Country: Belarus
- Region: Minsk Region
- District: Kapyl District

Population (2010)
  - Total: 507
- Time zone: UTC+3 (MSK)

Buchatsina (Belarusian: Бучаціна, romanized: Bučacina; Russian: Бучатино, romanized: Buchatino) is a village in Kapyl District, Minsk Region, Belarus. It serves as the administrative center of Buchatsina rural council. It is located 34 kilometres (21 mi) from Kapyl and 147 kilometres (91 mi) from the capital Minsk. In 1995, it had a population of 673. In 2010, it had a population of 507.
