= Patsyeyki =

Agrotown in Minsk Region, Belarus

Patsyeyki Пацейкі (Belarusian) Потейки (Russian)
- Agrotown
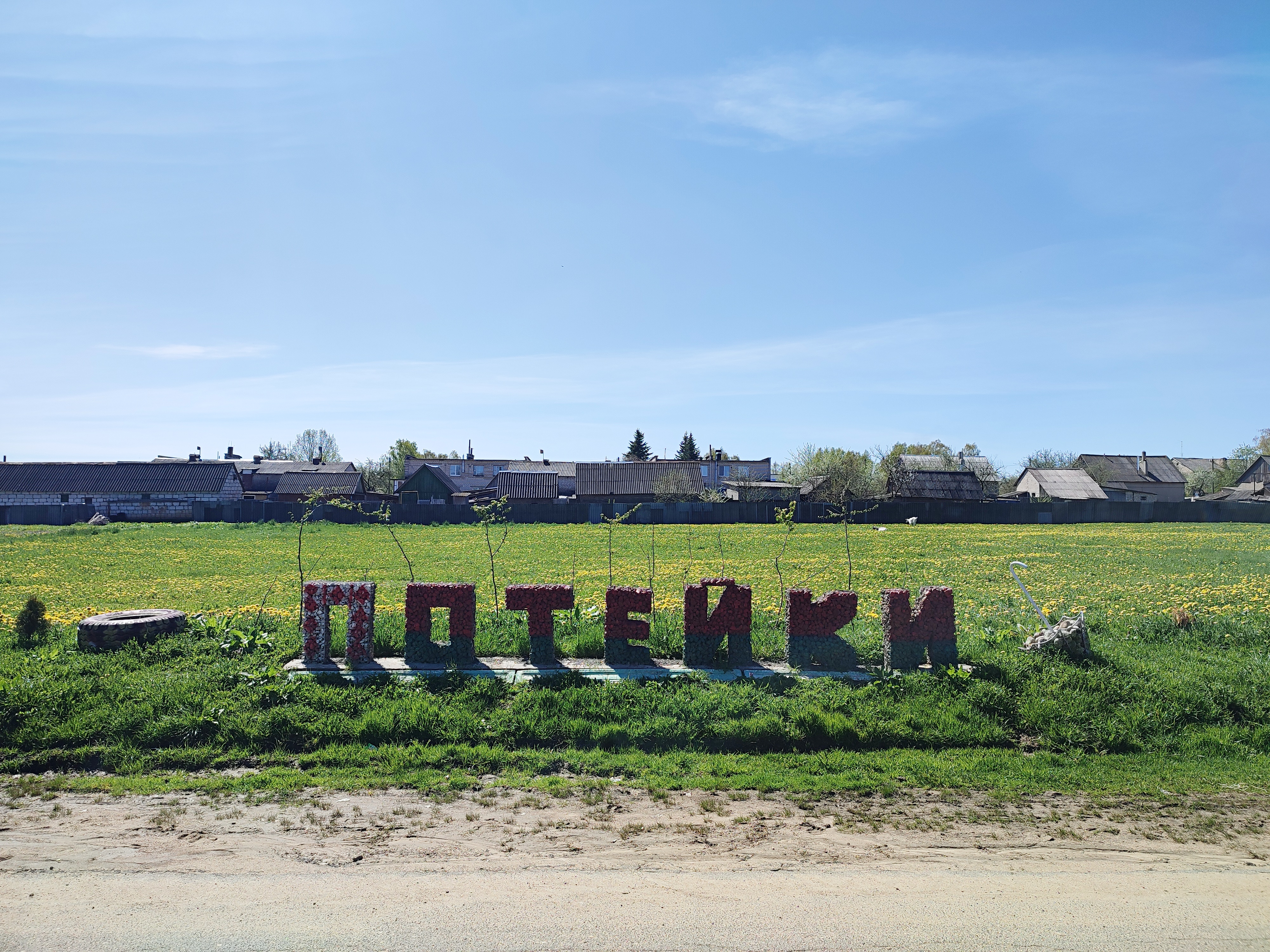

- Location within Belarus
- Coordinates: 53°10′43″N 26°57′28″E
- Country: Belarus
- Region: Minsk Region
- District: Kapyl District

Population (2010)
  - Total: 419
- Time zone: UTC+3 (MSK)

Patsyeyki (Belarusian: Пацейкі, romanized: Paciejki; Russian: Потейки, romanized: Poteyki) is an agrotown in Kapyl District, Minsk Region, Belarus. It serves as the administrative center of Patsyeyki rural council. It is situated 10 kilometres (6.2 mi) from Kapyl and 130 kilometres (81 mi) from the capital Minsk. In 2000, it had a population of 421. In 2010, it had a population of 419.
