= Syemyezhava rural council =

Syemyezhava rural council is a lower-level subdivision (selsoviet) of Kapyl district, Minsk region, Belarus. Its administrative center is Syemyezhava.
