= Babownya rural council =

Babownya rural council is a lower-level subdivision (selsoviet) of Kapyl district, Minsk region, Belarus. Its administrative center is Babownya.
