= Babownya =

Village in Minsk Region, Belarus

Babownya Бабоўня (Belarusian) Бобовня (Russian)
- Village
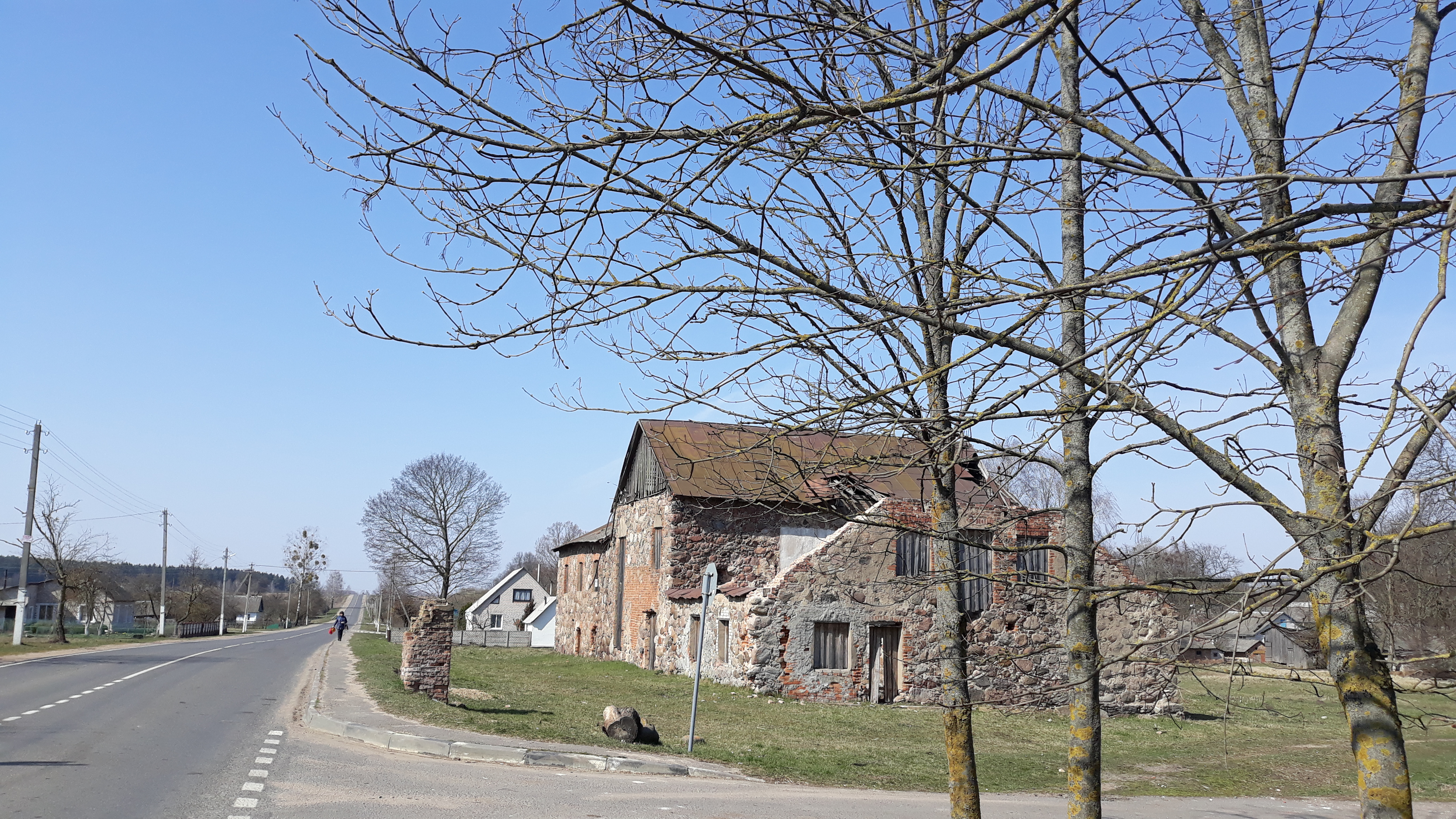

- Location within Belarus
- Coordinates: 53°15′27″N 26°57′11″E
- Country: Belarus
- Region: Minsk Region
- District: Kapyl District
- First mentioned: 1582

Population (1995)
  - Total: 491
- Time zone: UTC+3 (MSK)

Babownya (Belarusian: Бабоўня, romanized: Baboŭnia; Russian: Бобовня, romanized: Bobovnya) is a village in Kapyl District, Minsk Region, Belarus. It is administratively part of Babownya rural council. It is situated 15 kilometres (9.3 mi) from Kapyl and 120 kilometres (75 mi) from the capital Minsk. In 1995, it had a population of 491.

== History ==
The settlement is first mentioned in 1582 as belonging to the landowner Malinovsky.
