= Hrozava rural council =

Hrozava rural council is a lower-level subdivision (selsoviet) of Kapyl district, Minsk region, Belarus. Its administrative center is Hrozava.
