= Siarhei Bulba =

Belarusian politician

- Сяргей Бульба
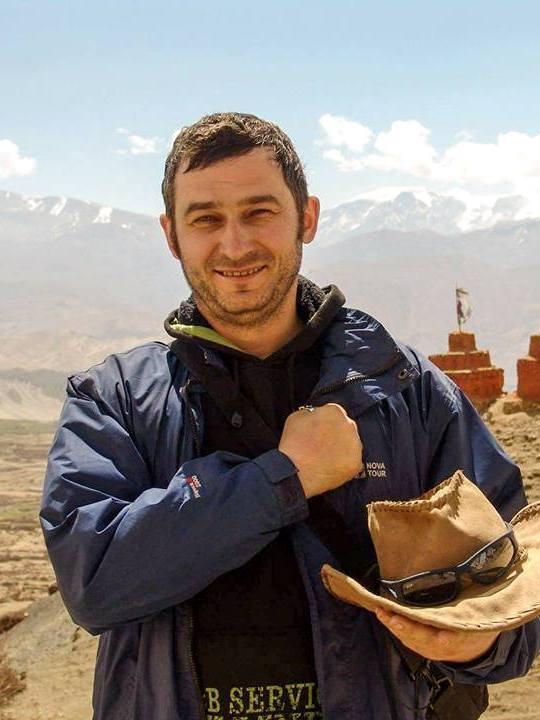
- Bulba in 2016

Personal details
- Born: Siarhei Chyslau; April 15, 1967 Minsk, Byelorussian SSR, Soviet Union
- Party: Belarusian Popular Front (early 1990s)
- Children: 2
- Education: Military Academy of Belarus
- Awards: Belarusian Democratic Republic 100th Jubilee Medal (2018)

Siarhei Bulba (né Chyslau; (Note: Belarusian: Сяргей Чыслаў) Belarusian: Сяргей Бульба, born April 15, 1967) is a Belarusian politician and military expert. He is the former leader of the paramilitary organisation White Legion (Belarusian: Белы легіён).

== Biography ==
Bulba graduated from a secondary school in Minsk and later the Minsk Higher Engineering Anti-Aircraft Missile School in 1989. While still a cadet, he co-founded a patriotic group called "Movement-63," inspired by the 1863 uprising led by Kastus Kalinouski. In 1989, Bulba was one of the few active army officers among the founders of the Belarusian Popular Front.

After his mandatory military service in the Russian Far East, Bulba returned to Belarus and became involved in various youth military formations, eventually leading to the formation of the White Legion in 1995. The organisation trained young Belarusians in military tactics and aimed to resist the regime of President Alexander Lukashenko. The group operated in secrecy and was reportedly involved in training future officers to be infiltrated in Belarusian security structures. Bulba also participated in parliamentary elections in 2003 and 2008 but was not elected.

In 2008 Bulba relocated abroad, living in countries like Nepal, India, and Ukraine. He has been involved in the World Association of Belarusians, and in 2023, he took over as head of the Belarusian Youth Hub in Warsaw. In 2024, Bulba became the leader of the paramilitary training organisation Paspalitaje Rushenne.

After the Russian invasion of Ukraine, Bulba has also been a frequent commentator on regional security in Belarusian, Ukrainian and other media.

== Political positions ==
Bulba is a proponent of a strategic union between Belarus and Ukraine.

== Personal life ==
Bulba is married and has two sons. In 2012, he officially changed his surname from Chyslau to Bulba. He also runs a business in the IT sector.
