= Novyya Doktaravichy =

Agrotown in Minsk Region, Belarus

Novyya Doktaravichy Новыя Доктаравічы (Belarusian) Новые Докторовичи (Russian)
- Agrotown
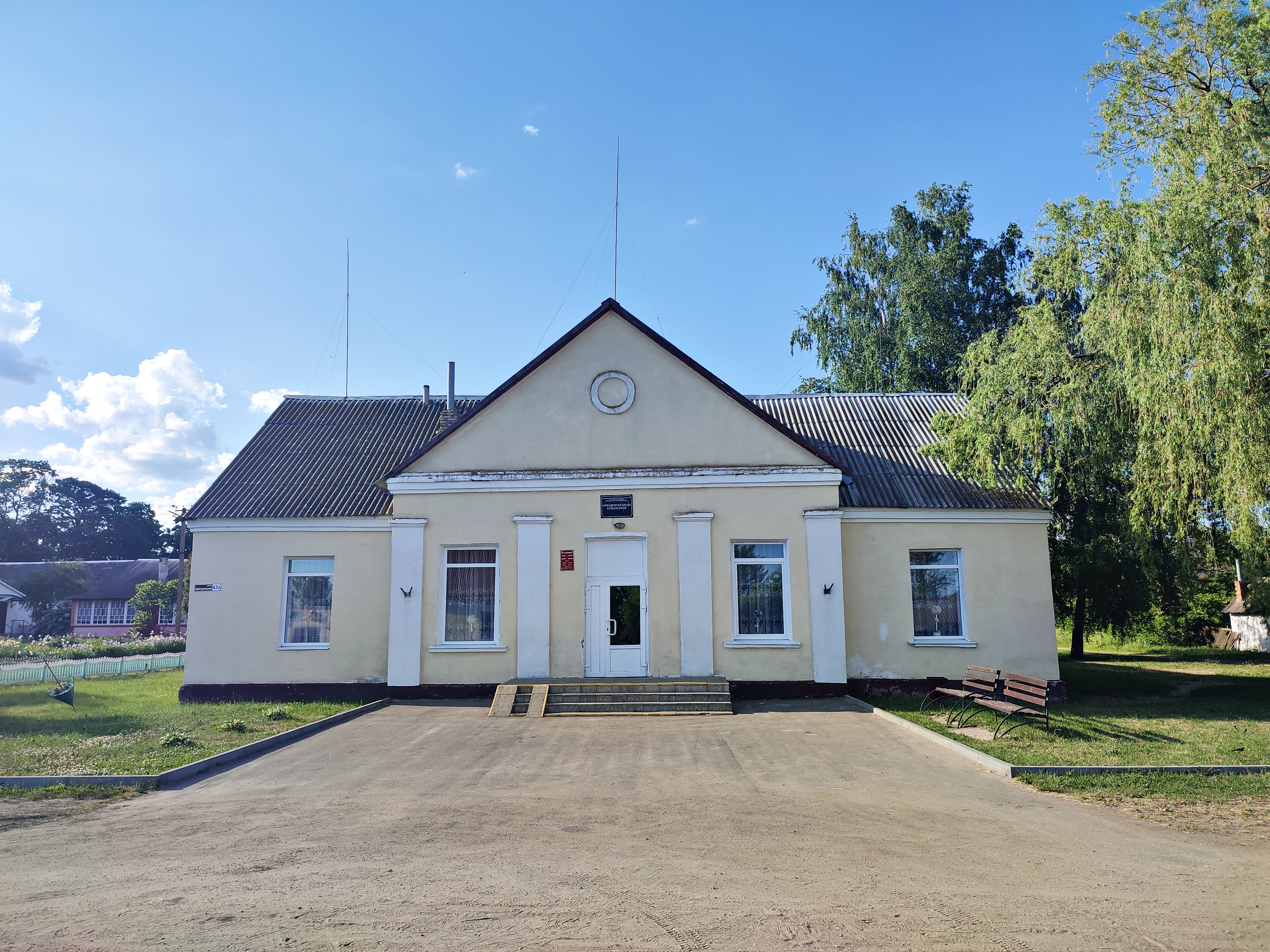

- Location within Belarus
- Coordinates: 53°05′44″N 27°14′36″E
- Country: Belarus
- Region: Minsk Region
- District: Kapyl District

Population (2010)
  - Total: 211
- Time zone: UTC+3 (MSK)

Novyya Doktaravichy (Belarusian: Новыя Доктаравічы, romanized: Novyja Doktaravičy; Russian: Новые Докторовичи, romanized: Novyye Doktorovichi) is an agrotown in Kapyl District, Minsk Region, Belarus. It serves as the administrative center of Doktaravichy rural council. It is located 10 kilometres (6.2 mi) from Kapyl and 125 kilometres (78 mi) from the capital Minsk. In 2000, it had a population of 446. In 2010, it had a population of 211.
