= Blyewchytsy rural council =

Subdivision of Kapyl district, Minsk region, Belarus

Blewchytsy rural council is a lower-level subdivision (selsoviet) of Kapyl district, Minsk region, Belarus. Its administrative center is Bystrytsa.
