= Slabada-Kuchynka =

Village in Minsk Region, Belarus

Slabada-Kuchynka Слабада-Кучынка (Belarusian) Слобода-Кучинка (Russian)
- Village
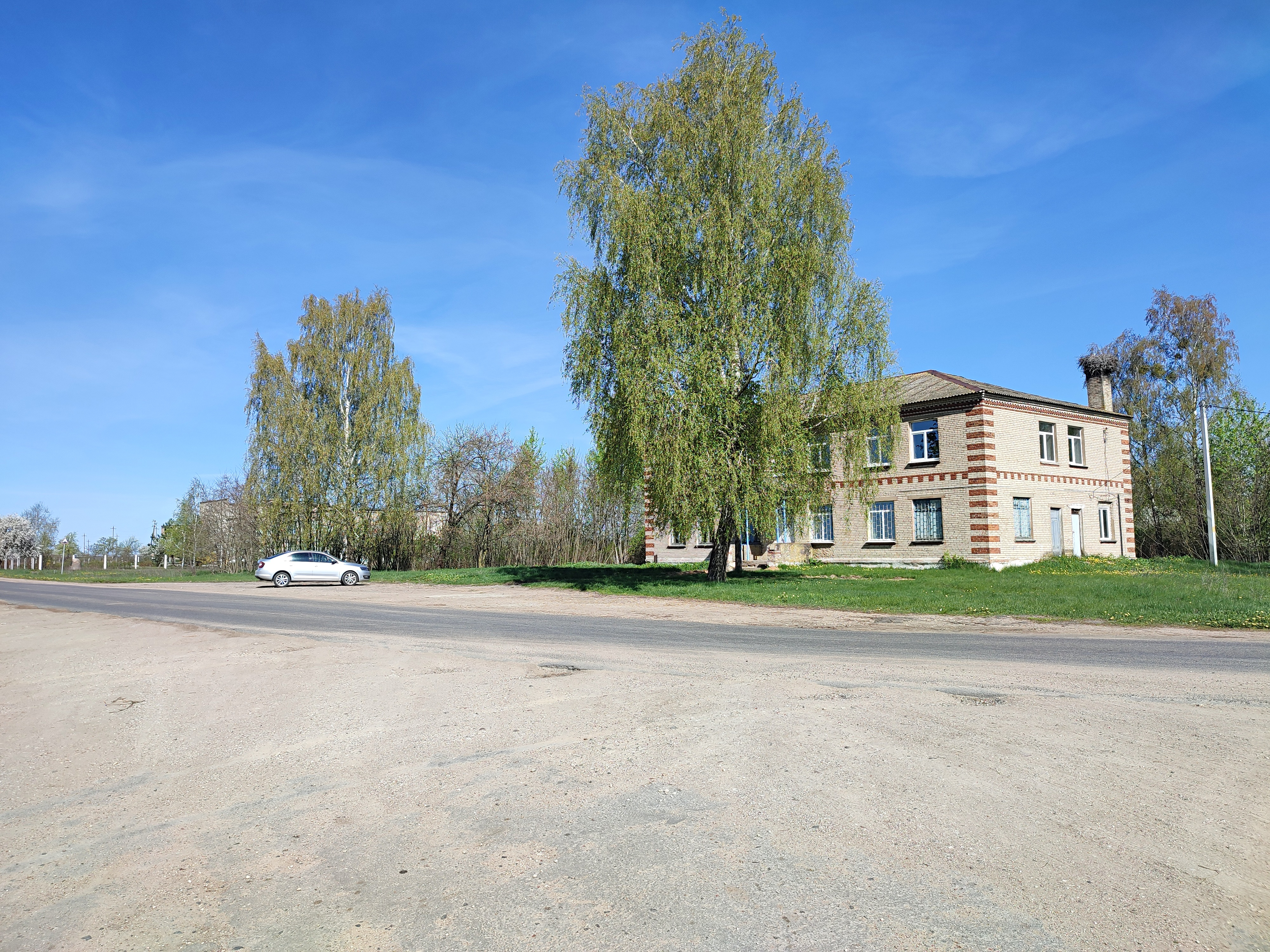

- Location within Belarus
- Coordinates: 53°15′24″N 27°10′49″E
- Country: Belarus
- Region: Minsk Region
- District: Kapyl District

Population (2010)
  - Total: 403
- Time zone: UTC+3 (MSK)

Slabada-Kuchynka (Belarusian: Слабада-Кучынка, romanized: Slabada-Kučynka; Russian: Слобода-Кучинка, romanized: Sloboda-Kuchinka) is a village in Kapyl District, Minsk Region, Belarus. It serves as the administrative center of Slabada-Kuchynka rural council. It is situated 14 kilometres (8.7 mi) from Kapyl and 108 kilometres (67 mi) from the capital Minsk. In 2001, it had a population of 502. In 2010, it had a population of 403.
