= People's Embassies of Belarus =

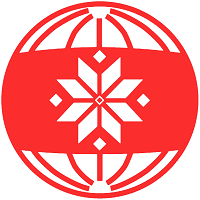
Emblem of the People's Embassies of Belarus

People's Embassies of Belarus (Belarusian: Народныя амбасады Беларусі, romanized: Narodnyja ambasady Bielarusi) is a project of the Belarusian diaspora abroad and was created in response to the official results of the 2020 Belarusian presidential election.

The organisation is entirely independent and unites volunteers around the world, who work to serve the global Belarusian community.

== History ==
The decision to create the People's Embassies of Belarus was made by representatives of the Belarusian diaspora on the basis of the resolution of the World Congress of Belarusians. The Congress took place from 30 October to 1 November 2020 with the opening ceremony of People's Embassies being held online on 10 December 2020. At the moment, the list of People's Embassies open around the world comprises more than twenty entities, including Australia, Austria, Brazil, Bulgaria, Canada, Cyprus, Estonia, France, Germany, Israel, Italy, Latvia, Lithuania, Luxembourg, Montenegro, Netherlands, Poland, Portugal, Scotland, Slovenia, South Korea, Spain, Sweden, and the UK.

In 2024, the KGB labeled the People's Embassies as an "extremist group".

== Main Function & Goals ==
The Belarusian diaspora informed the main functions and goals of People’s Embassies of Belarus as stated in the December 2020 statement. These functions include informing the public about and spreading awareness of the situation in Belarus, with a focus on protesting the disputed results of the 2020 Belarusian presidential election. The organisation also strives to establish and maintain contacts with government bodies, public associations, trade unions, business, scientific and cultural circles abroad and also supports the protection of the rights and interests of Belarusians living abroad as well as giving assistance to those forced to leave the country.

== Official Support ==
From inception in 2020, the People’s Embassies have been supported by National Leader Svetlana Tikhanovskaya, main opposition of Alexander Lukashenko during the 2020 elections. The People’s Anti-Crisis Management also support the organisation. Furthermore, the European Parliament Resolution of 2021 and the PACE Resolution 2499 from 2023 both highlight the importance of the People’s Embassies in the modern diplomatic climate.
