= Syemyezhava =

Agrotown in Minsk Region, Belarus

Syemyezhava Семежава (Belarusian) Семежево (Russian)
- Agrotown
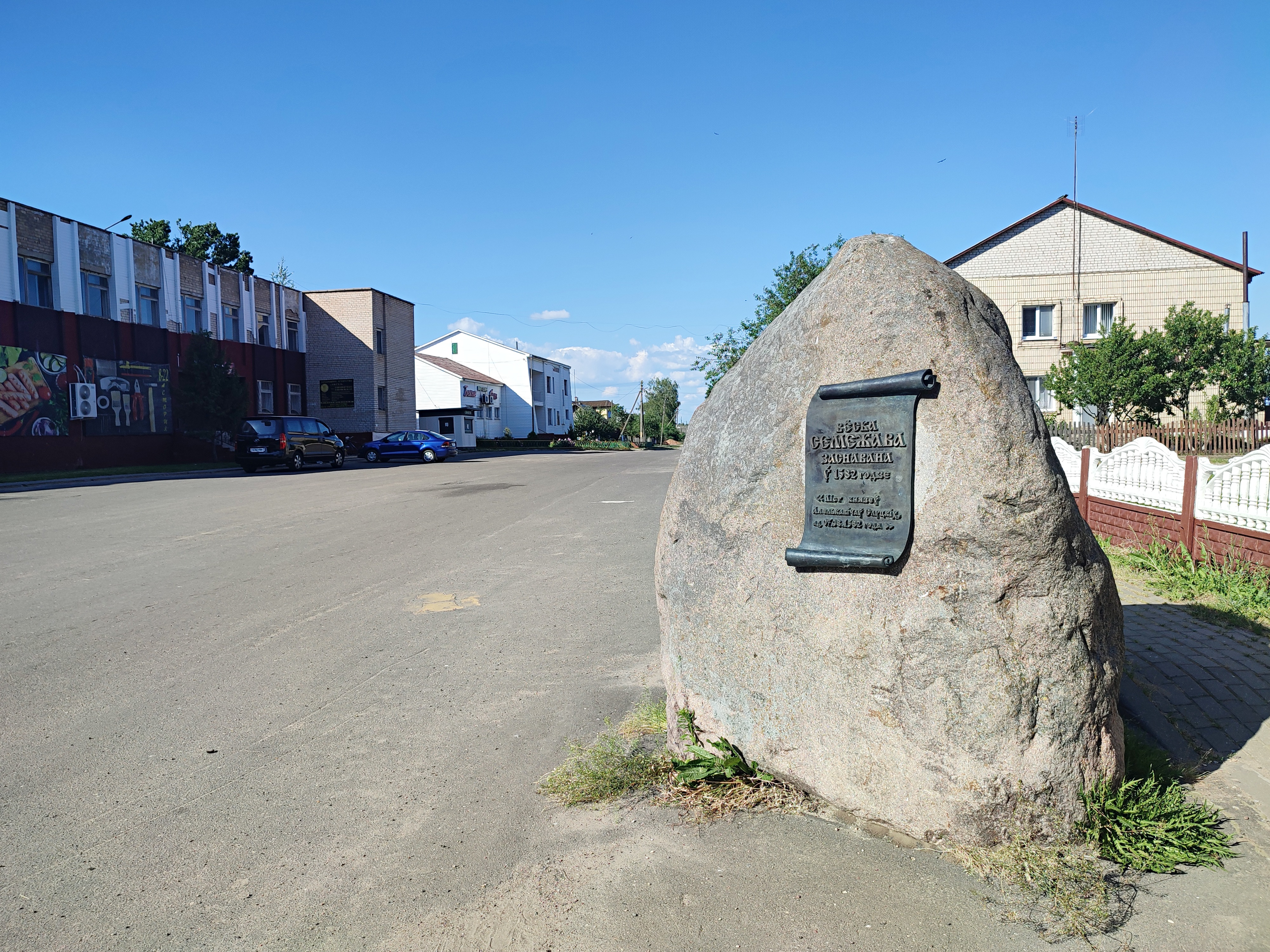

- Location within Belarus
- Coordinates: 52°57′36″N 27°00′12″E
- Country: Belarus
- Region: Minsk Region
- District: Kapyl District

Population (2010)
  - Total: 1,207
- Time zone: UTC+3 (MSK)

Syemyezhava (Belarusian: Семежава, romanized: Siemiežava; Russian: Семежево, romanized: Semezhevo) is an agrotown in Kapyl District, Minsk Region, Belarus. It serves as the administrative center of Syemyezhava rural council. It is 32 kilometres (20 mi) from Kapyl and 152 kilometres (94 mi) from the capital Minsk. In 2001, it had a population of 1,297. In 2010, it had a population of 1,207.
