= The Wall (Bykaŭ short story collection) =

- Author: Vasil Bykaŭ
- Original title: Сьцяна
- Language: Belarusian
- Genre: short stories
- Publisher: Nasha Niva
- Publication date: 1997
- Publication place: Belarus
- Pages: 384 pp
- Preceded by: The Pink Mist
- Followed by: Pitfall

The Wall ("Сцяна") is a collection of short stories by the Belarusian writer Vasil Bykaŭ.

== Description and background ==
The Wall deals with the fate of Belarus, from Stalinist repressions (novella Yellow Sand) and World War II battles that left Belarus in ruins to the dismal life of the Belarusian people in 1990s. The author's disillusionment and pessimistic attitude is obvious throughout. Similarly to many other works by Bykaw, parallels to existentialism can be drawn, e.g., the focus on choice and moral scruples. It depicts the absence of liberty and the powerlessness of an individual within a totalitarian system.

As Vasil Bykaŭ was declared a persona non grata during Alexander Lukashenko's regime, the stories were published in Russian literary magazines 'Druzhba Narodov' (nr 7,8,11, 1999) and 'Zvezda' (nr 5, 1999), the first book format being the translation (of most of the stories) into Estonian, entitled Valgevene tragöödia ('The Tragedy of Belarus'), in 2001.
