= Belarusian diaspora =

Communities of Belarusians outside Belarus

Map of the Belarusian diaspora in the world (includes people with Belarusian ancestry or citizenship). Belarus + 100,000 + 10,000 + 1,000

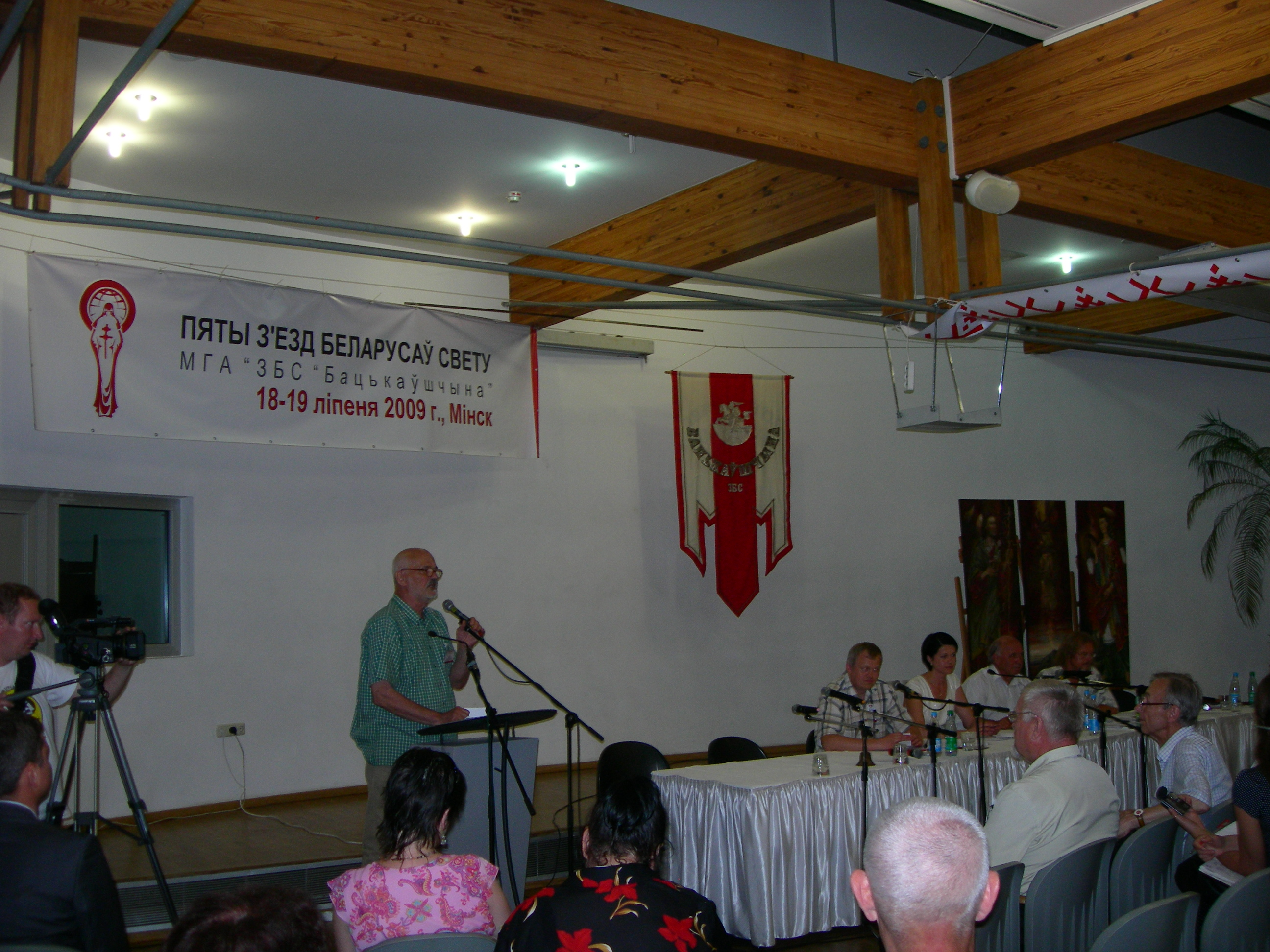
The 5th World Congress of Belarusians in Minsk, 2009

The Belarusian diaspora (Belarusian: Беларуская дыяспара, romanized: Biełaruskaja dyjaspara) refers to emigrants from Belarus which includes their descendants.

According to different researchers, there are between 2.5 and 3.5 million Belarusian descendants living outside the territory of the Republic of Belarus. This number includes descendants of economic emigrants from Belarus in the late 19th and early 20th centuries, Second World War-era emigrants and the 1990s-present period of emigration. Another part of the Belarusian diaspora are people who migrated within the USSR before 1991 and who after its dissolution became inhabitants of other post-Soviet countries. A separate faction usually associated with the Belarusian diaspora are ethnic minorities in the borderlands of Belarus with Poland, Lithuania, Latvia, Russia and Ukraine.

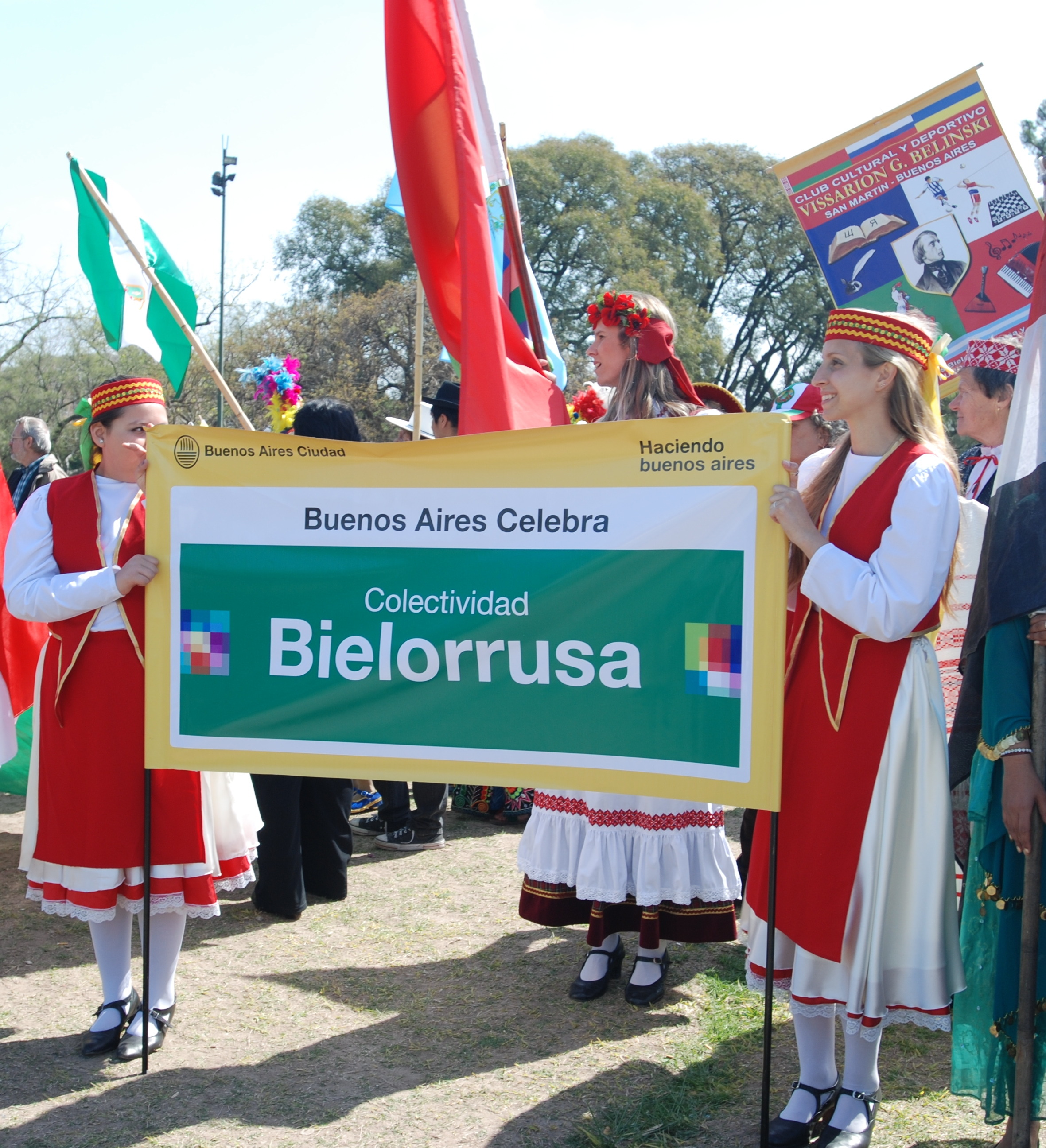
Argentines of Belarusian descent in Argentina on Immigrant Day, Buenos Aires, 2010

A separate group of emigrants from Belarus are Belarusian Jews who have established significant communities in the United States and Israel.

There is a tendency to underestimate the number of people identifying themselves as Belarusians according to official censuses.

The Minsk-based World Association of Belarusians is the international organization uniting people of Belarusian descent from around the world. The government of the short-lived Belarusian Democratic Republic has been in exile since 1919 and acts as a consolidating centre for many politically active Belarusians abroad, especially in North America and Western Europe.

== History ==
The earliest Belarusian emigrants came in the seventeenth century to the Netherlands and the United States under the pressure of the Catholic and Eastern Orthodox Counter-Reformation in Belarus. Belarusians later migrated to Siberia and the Far East after their lands were occupied in the eighteenth century by the Russian Empire. This continued throughout the nineteenth century.

Belarusians immigrated in large numbers to the United States once a rebellion from 1863 to 1864 that was led by Kastus Kalinouski was crushed by Tsarist forces. Between 1880 and 1920, many Jewish Belarusians and Belarusian peasants participated in immigration to the United States due to extreme poverty in the Russian Empire's Western province. Belarusians continued emigrating in the 1920s through the 1930s during Soviet leader Josef Stalin's repressions.

The end of World War II saw the second-largest emigration wave from Belarus. The demographics included a mix of people "who were running from the Soviets, victims of Stalin’s pre-war repressions, some Nazi collaborators and thousands of young Belarusian forced laborers who stayed in Europe after WWII." Most of these Belarusian immigrants moved to Canada, Australia, Brazil, and the US while some stayed in Germany, France, and the UK. After the collapse of the Soviet Union in 1991, the third wave began and continues today. It began as a wave of socio-economic emigration and turned into political asylum emigration when President Alexander Lukashenko established a dictatorial regime in 1994. Most Belarusians immigrated to European Union countries, the US, Australia, Canada and Russia. The latest wave of emigration from Belarus includes professionals such as software and other engineers, scientists, students and athletes.

In 1949, the Government of the Belarusian Democratic Republic in exile prepared an estimation of the total number of Belarusian migrants in the main countries of Belarusian emigration. The numbers included pre-war immigrants, mostly from West Belarus, as well as those who identified themselves as Russian or Polish.

Country	Number of Belarusian immigrants as of 1 May 1949
United States	500,000
Argentina	100,000, of which 60 thousand lived around Buenos Aires
Canada	30,000
Great Britain	11,000
Brazil	10,000
France	10,000
West Germany	10,000
Belgium	1,500
Australia	500
Austria	below 500
Venezuela	150
Sweden	100
Turkey	100
Italy	50
Denmark	50

== Europe ==
=== Czech Republic ===
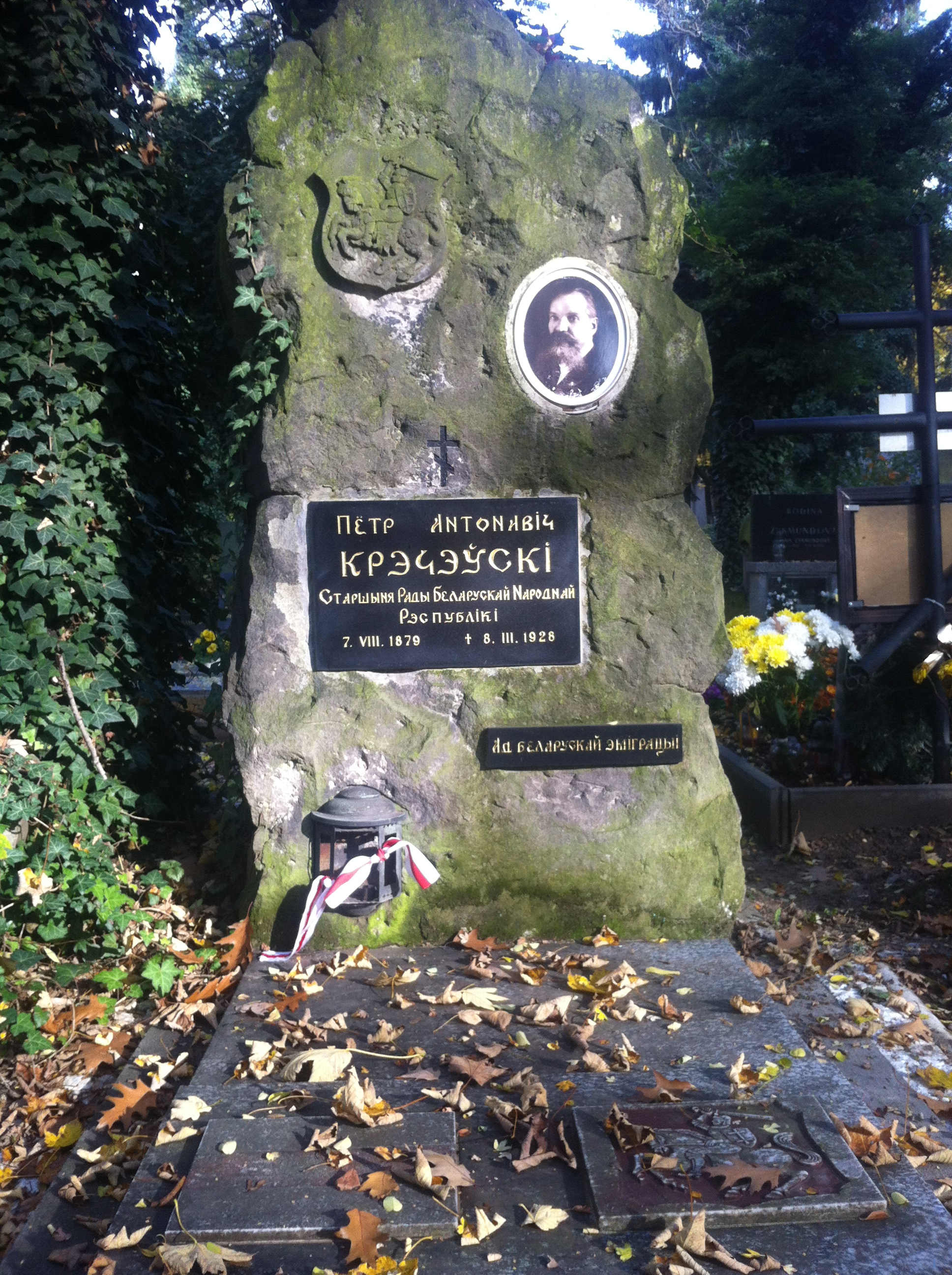
Tomb of Piotra Krečeŭski, the third President of the Belarusian Democratic Republic in exile, in Prague

Prague was an important centre of the Belarusian diaspora in the 1920s and 1930s. For most of the interwar years, it was the seat of the government in exile of the Belarusian Democratic Republic. Two presidents of the Rada BNR are buried in Prague, at the Olšany Cemetery. The interwar Belarusian diaspora of Czechoslovakia ceased to exist following World War II and the Soviet occupation of Czechoslovakia.

After 1991, Prague once again became an important centre of the Belarusian diaspora in the West, along with Warsaw and Vilnius. The Belarusian edition of Radio Free Europe/Radio Liberty relocated to Prague in the 1990s. A number of political refugees from Belarus have also settled in Prague. In 2013, Belarusians were officially recognized as an ethnic minority in the Czech Republic.

=== France ===
The first organisation of the Belarusian diaspora in the country (the Belarusian Union in France) was established by West Belarusian migrant workers in 1930. Several thousand Belarusian refugees and soldiers of the Anders' Army landed in France after World War II. They established a Belarusian cultural and religious centre in Paris.

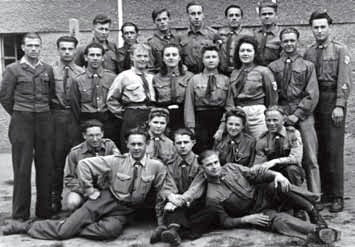
Belarusian scouts in Regensburg, West Germany, 1946

=== Germany ===
After World War II many Belarusians came as displaced persons to Allied-occupied Germany. From 1945 to 1950 there was a Belarusian Secondary School in Regensburg, West Germany named after Yanka Kupala. In 1948 Belarusian emigrants created a monument to the participants of the Slutsk Defence Action in Mittenwald. Nowadays Germany is home to 22,980 individuals with Belarusian passports.

As a result of the 2020–2021 Belarusian protests against Lukashenka's dictatorial rule, the Belarusian community "RAZAM" e.V., the first interest group of and for people with a Belarusian background living in Germany, was founded in August 2020.

=== United Kingdom ===
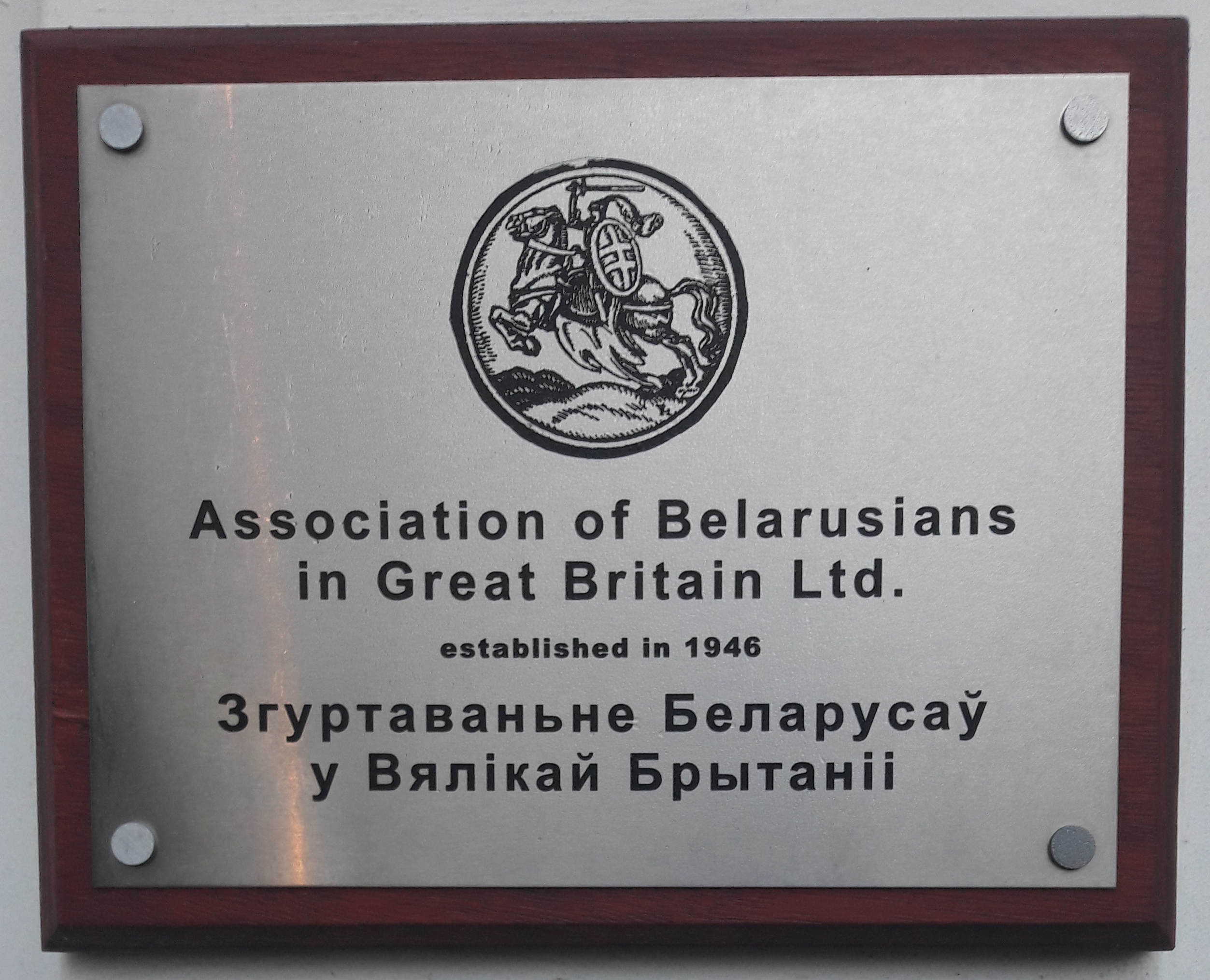
Entrance plaque on the Belarusian House in London, headquarters of the Association of Belarusians in Great Britain

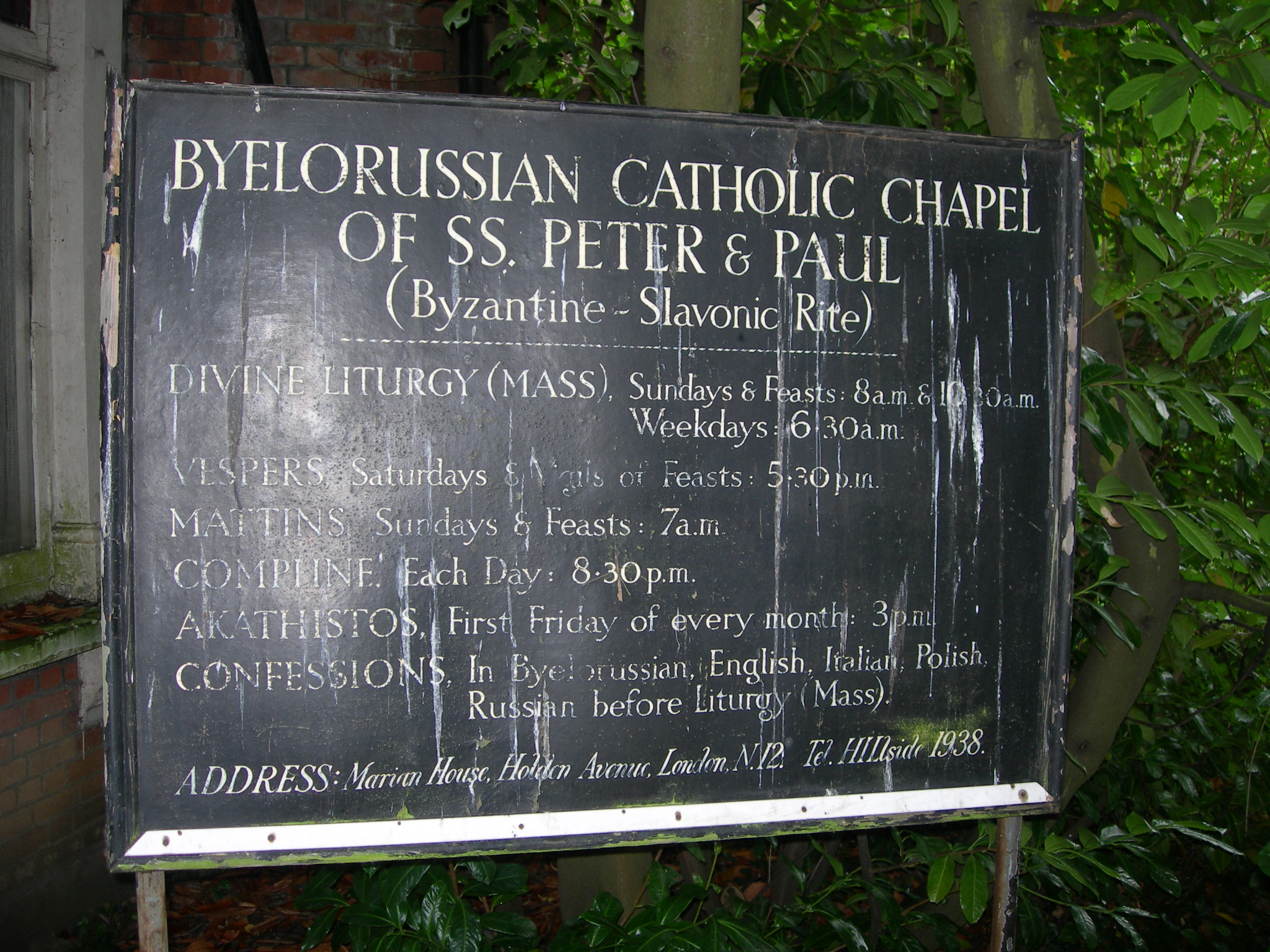
Sign at the Belarusian Church in London

Several thousand Belarusian refugees and soldiers of the Anders Army landed in Great Britain after World War II. They established a Belarusian cultural and religious centre in London. In 1971 the Francis Skaryna Belarusian Library and Museum was founded and nowadays it is the largest Belarusian library outside Belarus.

=== Latvia ===
According to the latest Latvian population census, currently there are 57 319 (2022) Belarusians in the country, who form 3.5 per cent of the total population of Latvia; 41,300 of them have non-citizen status. The majority of Belarusians live in large towns such as Riga, Daugavpils, Liepāja, Ventspils, and Jelgava as well as in small towns of the Latgale region. About 70 per cent of the students at the Riga Janka Kupala School are ethnic Belarusians. The republic of Belarus has assisted in the development of this school since many Belarusian citizens reside in, and attend the school in Riga. In February 2024, it became known that the Janka Kupala is going to be liquidated by August 2024. Latvia has a number of Belarusian public organisations with goals to promote the Belarusian culture, language and traditions, to preserve the national identity of the Belarusians in Latvia. These Belarusian organizations hold events to promote the traditions, culture and language of Belarus.

=== Lithuania ===
There is a sizeable Belarusian minority in Lithuania today, consisting of Soviet-era migrants and post-Soviet arrivals, including political refugees. According to Lithuania's migration authorities, over 62,000 Belarusian nationals lived in the country in 2024. The Belarusian and Polish-Lithuanian communities sought more representation in the Lithuanian government, as well the mass movement of Belarusian contract labourers via Poland into Western Europe in the 2000s.

=== Poland ===
Poland is home to a shrinking Belarusian minority that was part of the larger Białystok Voivodeship; annexed by Joseph Stalin in 1939 and incorporated into the Belarusian SSR, and returned to Poland after World War II. Aside from that, a stream of Belarusian immigrants has been coming into Poland from the 1990s, including political immigrants and Belarusian Poles. Now there are also Belarusian communities in larger cities like Warsaw and Kraków.

=== Russia ===
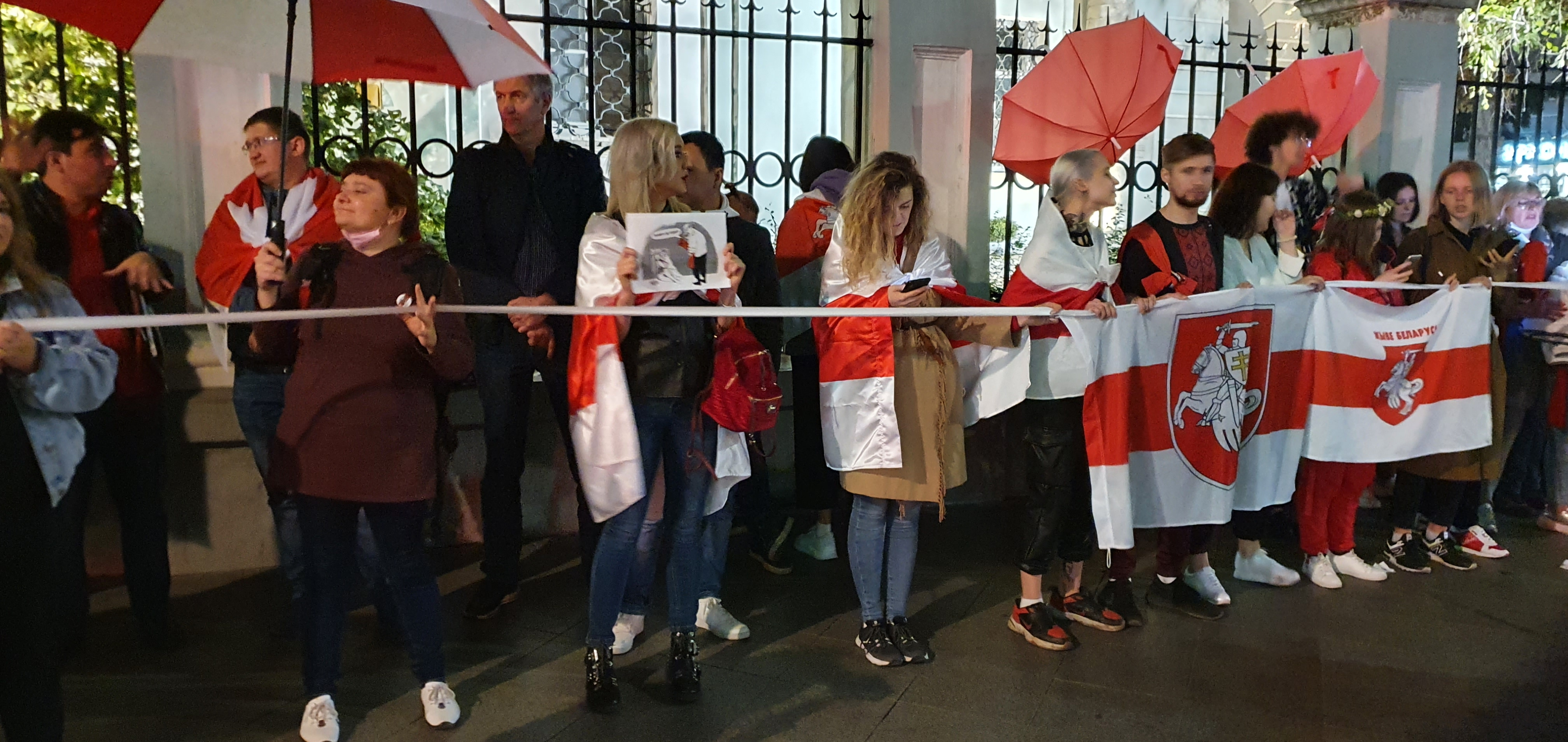
Protests by members of the Belarusian diaspora at the embassy of Belarus in Moscow against the regime of Alexander Lukashenko and political repressions in Belarus, September 2020

The Belarusian minority in Russia consists mainly of emigrants from Belarus during Soviet times and the times of the Russian Empire as well as of remainders of the indigenous Belarusian population of the regions of Smolensk and Bryansk, now largely assimilated. According to official 2002 census, over 800 thousand Russians identified themselves as people of Belarusian descent. The number drastically declined from over 1 million just a decade before (the 1991 Soviet Census) due to processes of assimilation, and factors affecting the population decline in Russia such as low birthrate and high death rate caused by the economic hardships of the 1990s. Most Russian Belarusians live in Moscow, St. Petersburg and Siberia.

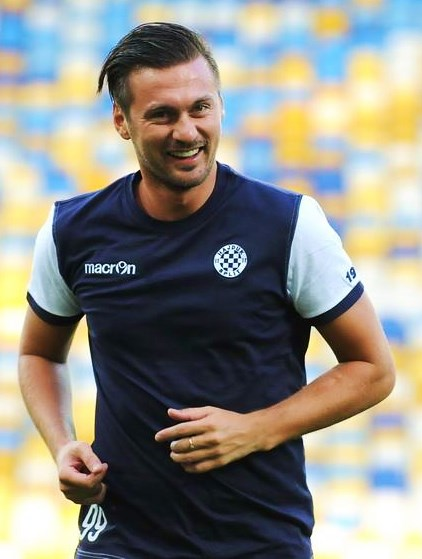
Artem Milevskyi, a Ukrainian footballer of Belarusian descent

=== Serbia ===
The number of Belarusian in Serbia is around 5,501 people, as stated by the Ministry of Internal Affairs of Serbia, between February 24 and November 2, 2022. Most of these Belarusians do not have Serbian citizenship, and have arrived during the Russian invasion of Ukraine. These numbers include all temporary passing residence and registered emigrants, including statistics from required registration after 30 days of visa free residence. Because of this, actual number of residence with Belarusian citizenship is smaller from the statistical numbers given my the Ministry of Internal Affairs.

=== Ukraine ===
In Ukraine, the number of Belarusians is estimated at over 275,000 (the 2001 Ukrainian Census) Most of the Belarusians diaspora in Ukraine appeared as a result of the migration of Belarusians to the Ukrainian SSR during the Soviet Union. Lviv has been an important center of Belarusian social and cultural life during the Russian Empire and interwar Poland. There are now Belarusian organizations in major cities like Lviv, Sevastopol in the Crimea, and others. A notable Ukrainian of Belarusian descent is Viktor Yanukovych, the fourth president of Ukraine.

== North America ==
=== Canada ===
Belarusian immigrants have been coming to Canada since the 19th century. Another wave of refugees came after the World War II, and established Belarusian Canadian Alliance, the oldest Belarusian diaspora organization, in 1948. It is difficult to estimate the real number of Canadians of Belarusian descent because immigrants from Belarus were often classified as Poles or Russians (sometimes Lithuanians, i.e., Litviny), or sometimes as Ukrainians. According to the 2011 Census there were 8,050 Canadians who claimed Belarusian ancestry.

=== United States ===
Belarusian immigrants have been coming to the USA since the 19th century. A large group of Belarusian immigrants from Belarus were Belarusian Jews, who came to the country in the late 19th century and early 20th century. Another wave of refugees came after the World War II. It is difficult to estimate the real number of Americans of Belarusian descent because immigrants from Belarus were often classified as Poles or Russians (sometimes Lithuanians, i.e., Litviny), or sometimes as Ukrainians.

The largest concentrations of Belarusian Americans live in the metropolitan New York area, New Jersey (especially Highland Park and South River), Cleveland (and its suburbs), Chicago (recent immigrants concentrated around Wheeling), Los Angeles, and Detroit.

== South America ==
=== Argentina ===
The First organized Belarusian diaspora in Argentina appeared in the first half of the 20th century. In the interwar period, the Belarusian diaspora counted between 10 and 20 thousand people. Almost all Belarusian immigrants of that time came to Argentina from Poland-occupied West Belarus. Unlike in other western countries, Belarusian organizations in Argentina were pro-Soviet and fell under influence of the Soviet embassy. There was a wave of repatriation to the Belarusian SSR in 1956.

== Sources ==
- Натальля Гардзіенка. Сучаснае беларускае замежжа: праблемы і перспектывы (даклад на V Зьездзе беларусаў сьвету) (Belarusians abroad today: problems and perspectives, report by Natallia Hardzijenka at the 5th World Congress of Belarusians in 2009)
