= Na Chornykh Lyadakh =

On Black Slash-and-Burn Fields
- На чорных лядах
- Directed by: Valeriy Panamaroŭ
- Written by: Vasil Bykaŭ, Valeriy Panamaroŭ
- Production company: Belarusfilm
- Release date: 1995
- Running time: 67 minutes
- Country: Belarus
- Language: Belarusian

Na Chornykh Lyadakh (Belarusian: На чорных лядах, On Black Slash-and-Burn Fields (Note: Often mistranslated as On Black Ice. In fact, "ляды" means "slash-and-burn fields" (see "Лядо") in East Slavic languages.)) is a Belarusian drama film based on two short stories by Vasil Bykaŭ, "On Black Slash-and-Burn Fields" (Belarusian: На чорных лядах) and "Before the End" (Belarusian: Перад канцом).

== Plot ==
A group of Belarusian anti-Soviet insurgents from the failed Slutsk Defence Action wanders through forests, fleeing from the surrounding Bolshevik army. They learned that the Bolsheviks carry the bodies of the killed insurgents around local villages for identification and retaliation against their families. To avoid this the insurgents decide to commit group suicide in a remote desolate place. Only the youngest of the insurgents is left to bury the others' bodies and live on.

== Production and distribution ==
The premiere of the movie was scheduled for soon after the controversial referendum held by the authoritarian pro-Russian president Aliaksandr Lukashenka, but never took place as the only copy of the film had allegedly been stolen before the event. The copy was allegedly found later, but the film was shown only to limited audience.

According to media, the film was banned by Lukashenka's chief ideologist of that time, Vladimir Zametalin. Valery Ponomaryov (Valeriy Panamarow), the film's director, was banned from further work in the film industry. The movie has been distributed illegally through VHS and DVD in Belarus and abroad.

On Black Slash-and-Burn Fields was allegedly invited to participate in several international film festivals but Belarusfilm as the official right holder did not respond to the invitations. In 2020, Belarusfilm uploaded the film on its official YouTube channel, however, the video has since been made private.
