= Slutsk uprising =

Attempt to establish an independent Belarus in 1920

- Part of the Russian Civil War and the Soviet-Polish War
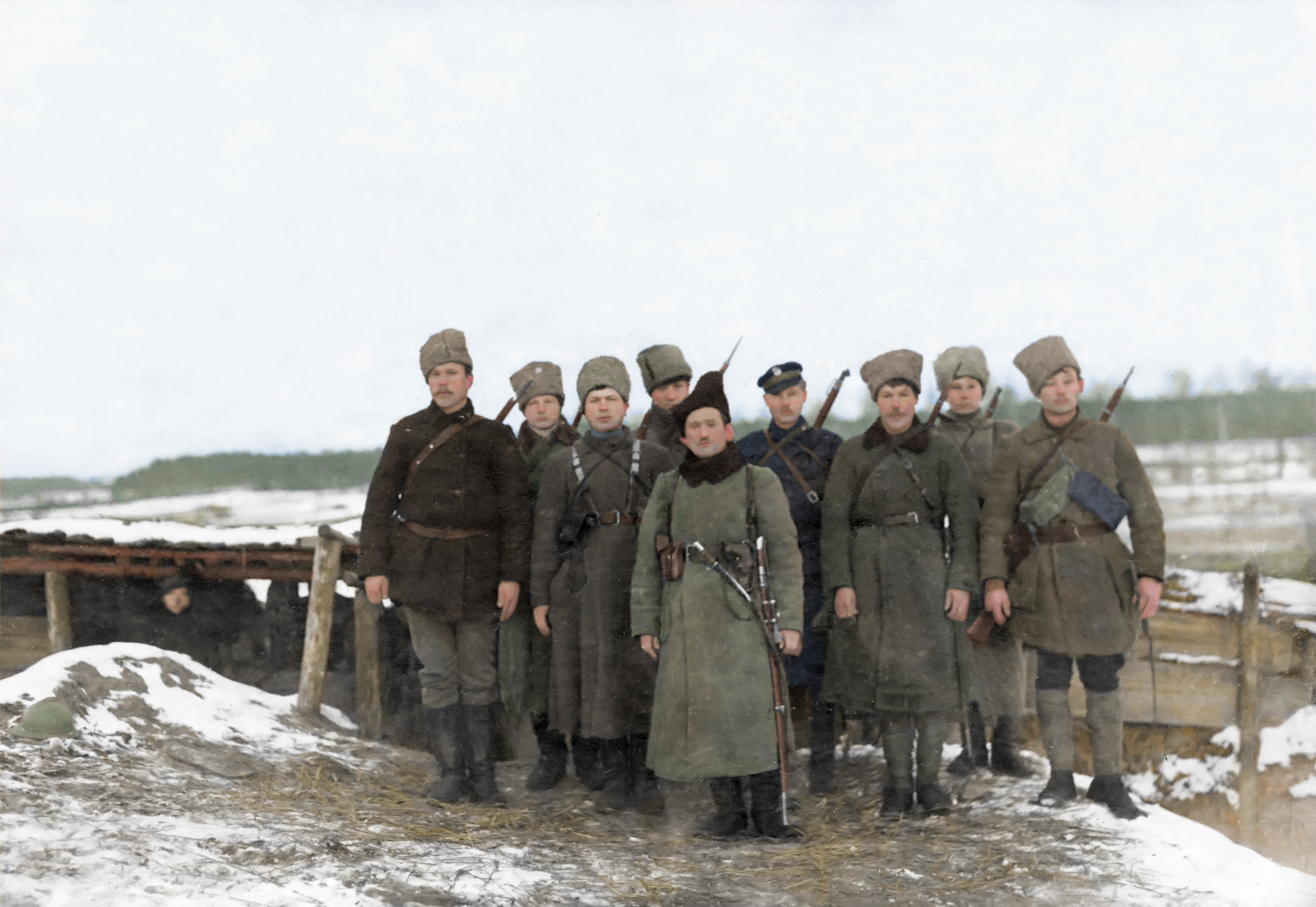
- The 1st Belarusian Partisan Detachment with its leader, Lukasz Siemenik, in the centre (1919)
Date	November 27 to December 31, 1920
Location	Slutsk, Belarus, and surrounding villages
Result	Soviet victory

Belligerents
Local Belarusian units	Russian SFSR; Byelorussian SSR

Commanders and leaders
Paval Zhauryd	N/A

Strength
10,000	N/A

The Slutsk uprising (Belarusian: Слуцкае паўстанне, romanized: Sluckaje paŭstannie) or the Slutsk defence, or Slitsk military action (Belarusian: Слуцкі збройны чын, romanized: Slucki zbrojny čyn) was an unsuccessful armed attempt to establish an independent Belarus. It took place in late 1920, near the end of the Polish-Soviet War, in the region of the town of Slutsk. It involved a series of clashes between irregular Belarusian forces loyal to the Belarusian People's Republic and the Soviet Red Army, ending in a Soviet victory.

== Prelude ==
=== Peace of Riga ===
Polish and Soviet Russian borders after the 1921 Peace of Riga

The preliminary peace accord (later finalized in Peace of Riga), signed on October 12, 1920, set new borders between Poland and the Soviet republics that divided modern Belarus and Ukraine in two parts. No Belarusian delegation was invited to the Riga congress — neither from the Belarusian Democratic Republic nor from the puppet Socialist Soviet Republic of Byelorussia.

== Modern reflections of the Slutsk military defence ==
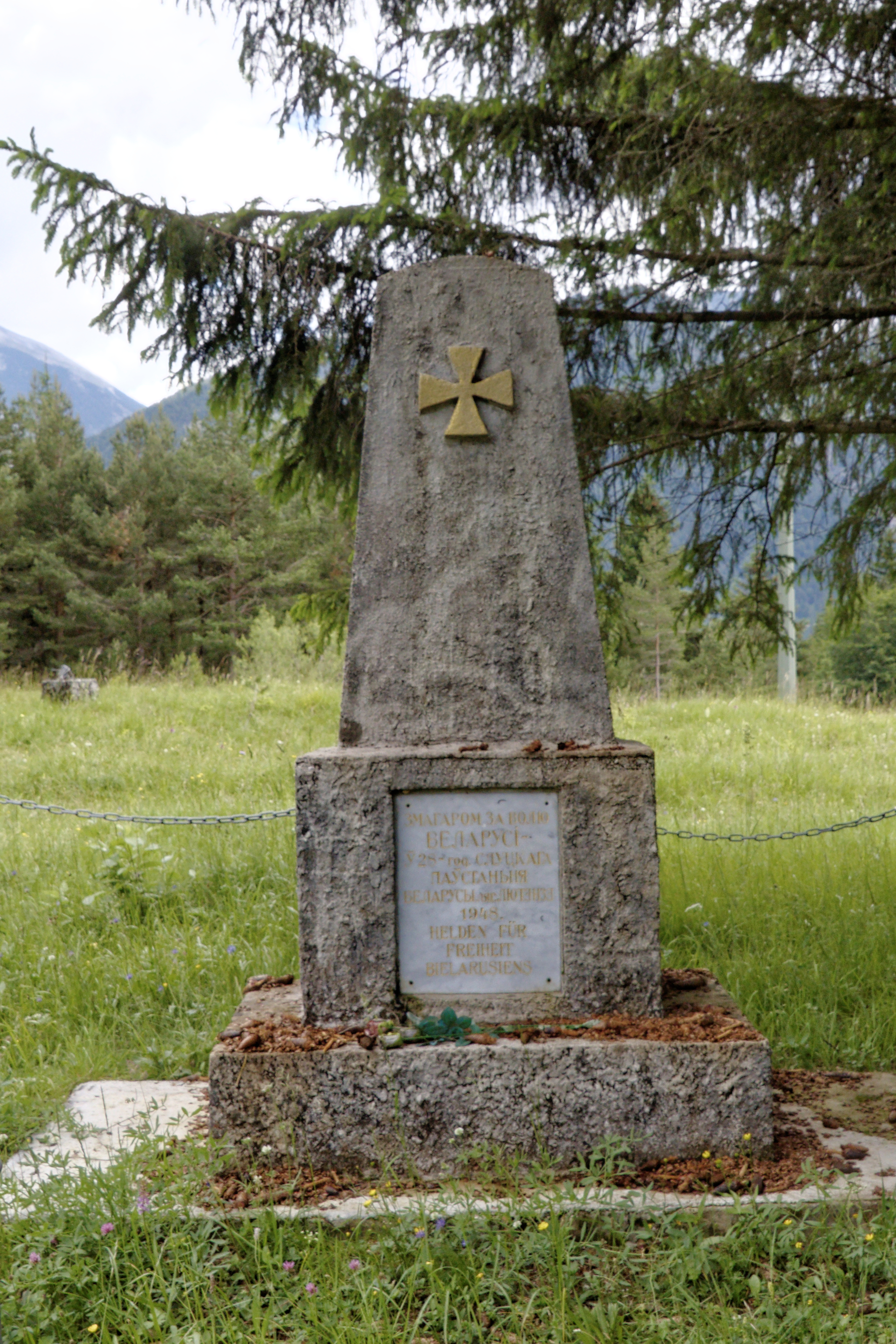
Monument in honor of Slutsk rebels near Mittenwald

During Perestroika, a number of political groups dedicated themselves to publicise a movement that was virtually erased from history during the Soviet time. November 27 became a holiday that groups like the Belarusian Popular Front and some intellectuals celebrate as Heroes Day. However, Belarusian officials under president Alexander Lukashenko do not recognise the Słuck military defence as significant.

In 1948, a monument in honor of Słuck rebels was placed by Belarusian emigrants near Mittenwald, a German city near the Alps.

== In culture ==
- 1994: On Black Slash-and-Burn Fields (Belarusian: На чорных лядах), a novel by Vasil Bykau
- 1995: On Black Slash-and-Burn Fields a film based on the short story

== See also ==
- Bibliography of the Russian Revolution and Civil War
- Outline of the Russian Revolution and Civil War
- Index of articles related to the Russian Revolution and Civil War
- The "Russian" Civil Wars, 1916–1926: Ten Years That Shook the World
- Russia in Flames: War, Revolution, Civil War, 1914–1921
- Russia in Revolution: An Empire in Crisis, 1890 to 1928
- Russia: Revolution and Civil War, 1917—1921
- The Russian Revolution: A New History
