= Belarusian community RAZAM =

Organization in Berlin, Germany (e. 2020)

Belarusian community RAZAM e.V.
- Belarusische Gemeinschaft Razam e.V.
- Founded: 9 August 2020
- Location: Berlin, Germany
- Members: more than 270 (2024)
- Official language: German, Belarusian
- Chair: Yuliya Salauyova (2024)
- Chair: Maria Rudz (2024)
- Treasurer: Lena Borries (2024)
- Website: razam.de

The Belarusian community RAZAM e.V. is a non-profit association of people from Belarus living in Germany. The association emerged as a result of the 2020–2021 Belarusian protests against the Alexander Lukashenko dictatorship.

== Creation and goals ==
The Belarusian community RAZAM e.V. was officially founded on 9 August 2020, the day of the 2020 Belarusian presidential election, of which the results were considered to have been falsified according to Der Tagesspiegel. As of May 2021, it is the biggest group representing the approximately 26,000 Belarusians living in Germany.

The official goals stated by RAZAM e.V. include:

- representation of the interests of the Belarusian diaspora in Germany
- promotion of the Belarusian language and culture
- making Belarus visible to the German and European public
- being a strong lobby for a democratic Belarus
- providing assistance to victims of repression.

== Funding ==
RAZAM receives funding via donations. Some RAZAM projects are financed by the Federal Foreign Office, the German Marshall Fund of the United States and other funds.

== Activities ==
RAZAM's activities include helping victims of police violence, refugees, and victims of political repression that occurs in Belarus. Families of political prisoners in Belarus are helped by RAZAM with financial support for legal cases and moral support such as sending presents to the prisoners' children. Victims of police violence or torture are assisted by RAZAM in getting to Germany for medical treatment.

Within Germany itself, RAZAM helps Belarusian refugees find legal assistance for asylum applications and with donations for families without work permits and ineligible for governmental financial support. RAZAM has also helped Belarusian refugees in Ukraine, in cooperation with the NGO Free Belarus Center based there. During the 2022 full-scale Russian invasion of Ukraine, RAZAM supported Belarusians fleeing Ukraine including those in Poland.

After the outbreak of the full-scale invasion in February 2022, RAZAM helped to collect relief supplies for Ukraine, opened a storage room in Berlin to provide refugees with clothing and hot meals, and supported mine-clearing teams in Ukraine.

== Information distribution and campaigning ==
RAZAM disseminates information and communicates with governments in the European Union. In 2021, regional RAZAM groups organised rallies, concerts and art exhibitions in Germany against the Lukashenko government and publicised their view of the situation in Belarus.

In August 2020, RAZAM was one of the co-founders of a Germany-based "Belarus Working Group" together with the German-Russian Exchange, the German think tank Zentrum Liberale Moderne, the association "Human Rights in Belarus," the European Exchange, and the German–Belarusian Society.

== Awards ==
On 23 May 2023, the Belarusian community RAZAM was awarded the Gustav Heinemann Citizens' Prize of the Social Democratic Party of Germany.

== Reaction of the authorities ==
In the summer of 2023, a Belarusian court recognized the pages of the association and its regional groups on Instagram as extremist materials.
