= Paval Zhauryd =

Belarusian military commander

- Павал Жаўрыд
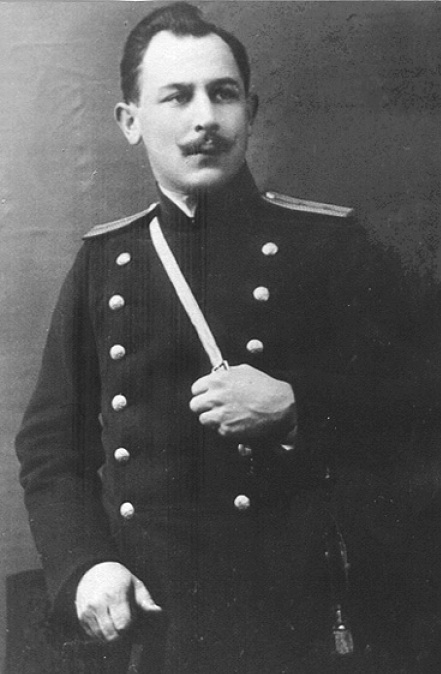
- Paval Zhauryd, before 1918
- Born: 13 June 1889; Cieciarouka, Slutsky Uyezd, Russian Empire
- Died: 11 May 1939 (aged 49); Knyazhpogos, Komi SSR, Russian SFSR
- Military career
- Allegiance: Russian Empire; Belarus
- Conflicts: First World War Slutsk Defence Action

Paval Yakaulevich Zhauryd (Belarusian: Па́вал Я́каўлевіч Жаўры́д, Russian: Па́вел Я́ковлевич Жаври́д, 13 June 1889 in Žaǔryd – 11 May 1939) was a Belarusian military commander.

Zhauryd was born in the village of Cieciarouka in the Slutsky Uyezd and graduated from the Slutsk Gymnasium in 1909. As a student at the gymnasium, Zhauryd created a Belarusian separatist club with his classmates. After graduation, he studied at the law faculty of the Warsaw University.

He was mobilised into the Russian Imperial Army in 1916, during the First World War. After military training in Poltava, Paval Zhauryd was sent to Turkestan and later to the Romanian Front. After the Russian February Revolution, Paval Zhauryd was elected as his regiment's committee president. He was a delegate at the First All-Belarusian Congress in December 1917, where preparations for the declaration of independence of the Belarusian People's Republic had been initiated.

Since 1918 Zhauryd had been working as a lawyer in Slutsk. At that time he became a member of the Belarusian Socialist-Revolutionary Party. In the summer of 1919 he was arrested by the Bolsheviks and accused of "assisting Denikin" and taken to Smolensk.

Liberated in 1919, Zhauryd came back to Slutsk and was elected president of the Slutsk Belarusian Committee, a local group supporting the Belarusian Democratic Republic.

In July 1920 Zhauryd was mobilised by the Bolsheviks into the Red Army and was appointed aide to the commander of the Slutsk cavalry unit. In late 1920, Belarusian officials appointed Zhauryd the Commissary of the Belarusian Democratic Republic in the Slutsk powiat. In this function Paval Zhauryd was one of the commanders of the anti-Bolshevik Slutsk defence action.

Beginning in 1921 Zhauryd lived in Vilnius, where he was member of the local Belarusian National Committee and the Belarusian Schools Council. He later migrated to East Belarus and worked in his parents' place, in the villages Bor and Zarechcha near Slutsk. In 1923–1930 Zhauryd worked for the Belarusian Agroindustrial Union, an agricultural education institution in the town of Marjina Horka, the Belarusian Culture Institute and the newspaper Zvyazda.

Along with several other Belarusian intellectuals, Paval Zhauryd was arrested by the GPU on July 18, 1930, as part of the Case of the Union of Liberation of Belarus. In April 1931 he was sentenced to three years in a concentration camp. After liberation in 1933, he lived in Sarapul, Udmurtia.

In 1937 Zhauryd was again arrested "for anti-Soviet propaganda" and sentenced to ten years in concentration camps. He was sent to Knyazhpogost in the Komi Autonomous Soviet Socialist Republic, where he died in prison.

Paval Zhauryd was rehabilitated in 1988 by the Belarusian Supreme Court and the Oblast Court of Kirov.
