= World Association of Belarusians =

Diaspora organization

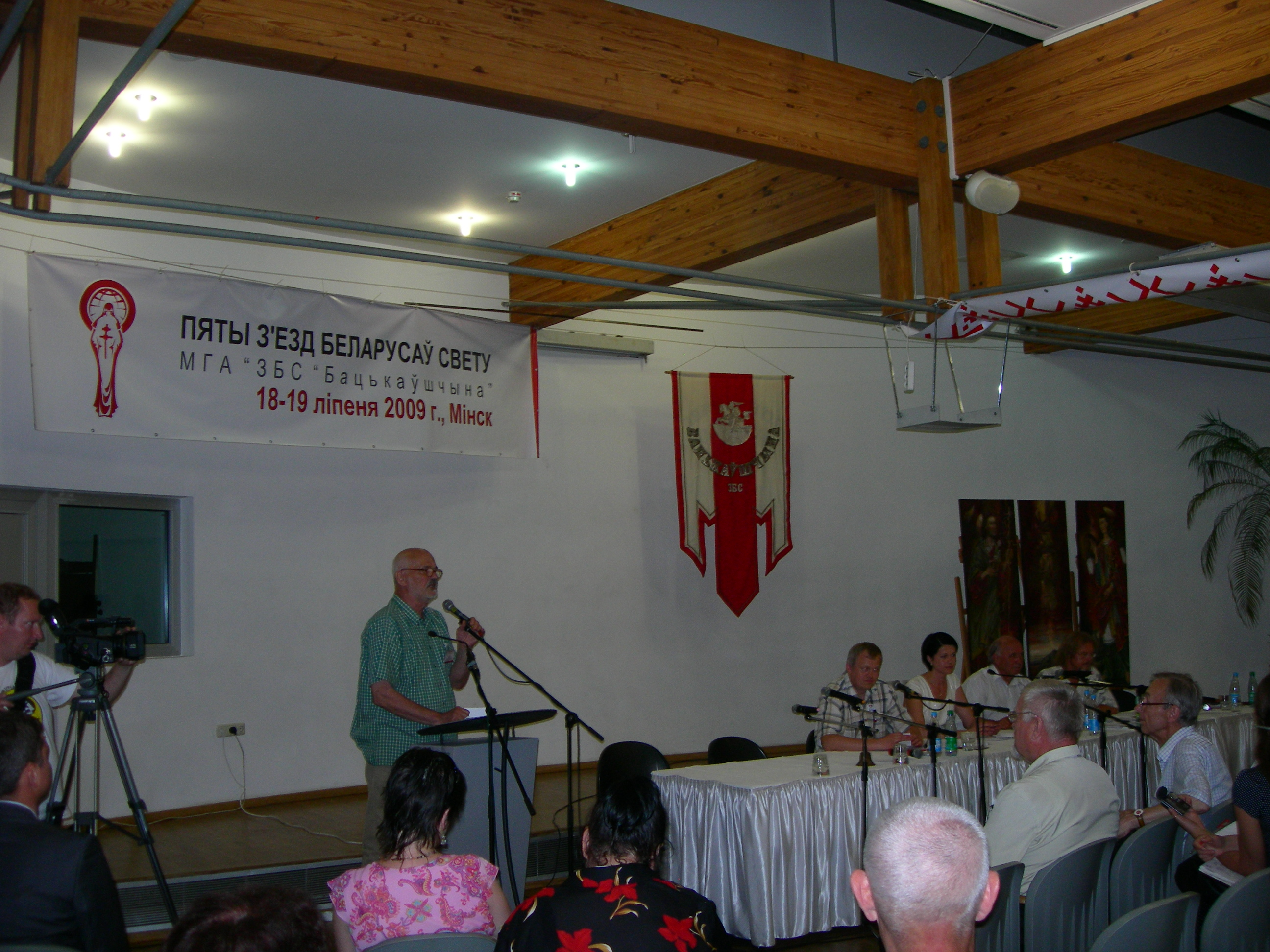
5th World Congress of Belarusians in Minsk, 2009

The World Association of Belarusians (Belarusian: Згуртаванне беларусаў свету, romanized: Zhurtavannie biełarusaŭ śvietu), referred to as "Baćkaŭščyna" («Бацькаўшчына» [ˈbat͡sʲkau̯ʂt͡ʂɨna] – lit. 'Fatherland'), is an international organisation uniting people of Belarusian descent globally. Currently 135 organisations of the Belarusian diaspora from 28 countries are members of Baćkaŭščyna.

The organisation was founded in 1990 and promotes Belarusian culture at home and abroad by publishing numerous books and organizing conferences, including World Congresses of Belarusians, which take place every five years.

The current President of Baćkaŭščyna is Alena Makoŭskaja. The Head of Council is Nina Šydłoŭskaja.

On 24 September 2021, the Supreme Court of Belarus liquidated the World Association of Belarusians. Its office in Minsk was previously searched and sealed.

== Literature ==
- Silitski, Vitali; Zaprudnik, Jan (2010). The A to Z of Belarus (The A to Z Guide Series). Lanham: Scarecrow Press. pp. 23–24. ISBN 978-0810872004.
