= Kapyl district =

District of Minsk region, Belarus

Kapyl district Капыльскі раён (Belarusian) Копыльский район (Russian)
- District
- Flag Coat of arms

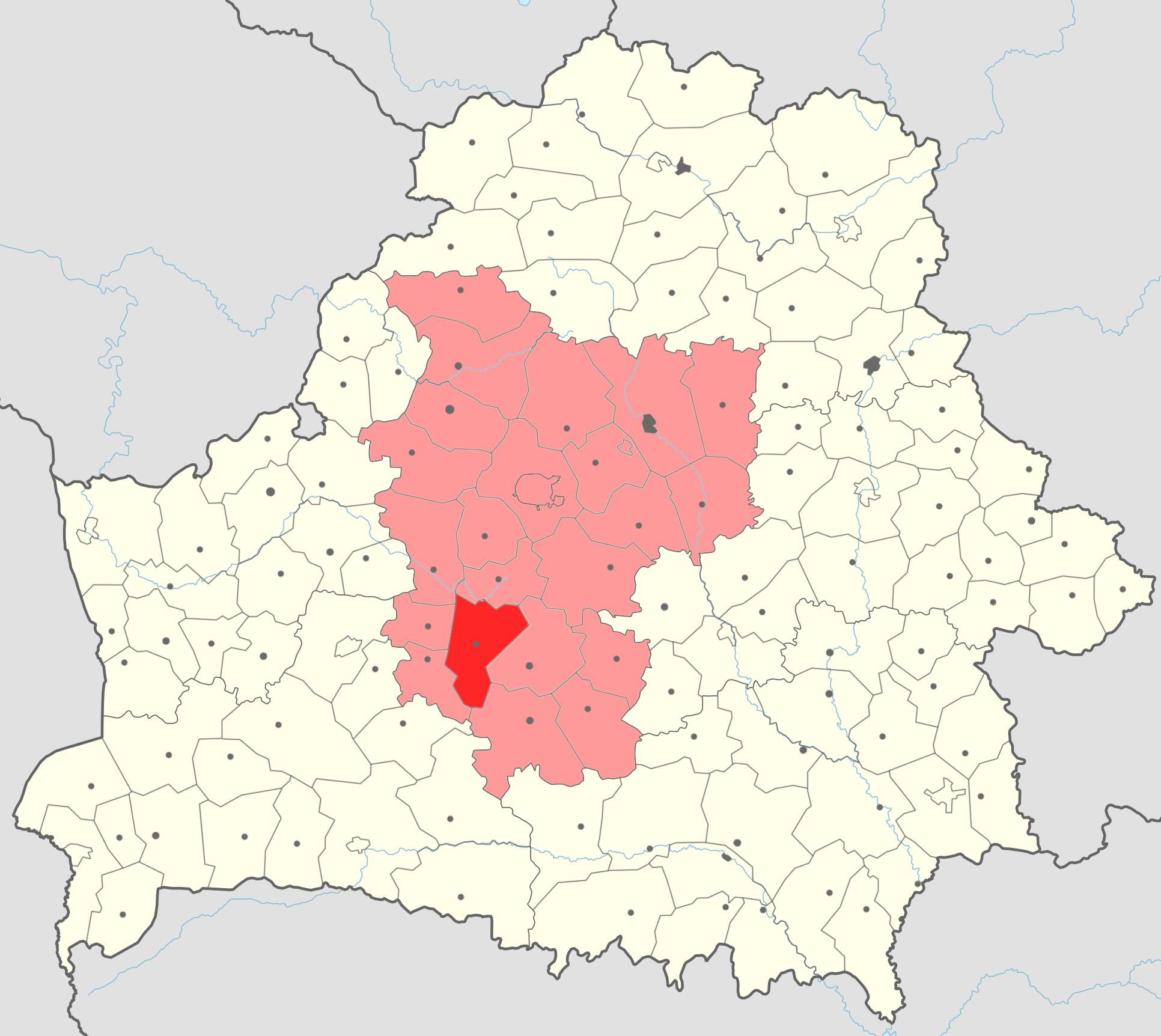
- Coordinates: 53°09′00″N 27°05′30″E
- Country: Belarus
- Region: Minsk region
- Administrative center: Kapyl

Area
  - District: 1,600 km^{2} (620 sq mi)

Population (2024)
  - District: 26,533
  - Urban: 9,985
  - Rural: 16,548
- Time zone: UTC+3 (MSK)
- Website: Kopyl ispolkom website

Kapyl district or Kapyĺ district (Belarusian: Капыльскі раён; Russian: Копыльский район) is a district (raion) of Minsk region in Belarus. Its administrative center is Kapyl. As of 2024, it has a population of 26,533.

== Notable residents ==
- Ales Adamovich (1927, Kanuchi village – 1994), Belarusian writer and critic, author of the screenplay for film “Come and See”
- Paval Zhauryd (1889, Cieciarouka village – 1939), Belarusian military figure, one of the commanders of the Slutsk defence action and a victim of Stalin's purges
