= Artur Wilke =

Nazi war criminal and SS Major

Artur Fritz Wilke (1 February 1910 in Hohensalza – 11 May 1989 in Peine) was a Nazi war criminal and SS Major (sturmbannführer). He was convicted with murder of 6,600 Jews. After the war, Wilke assumed his deceased brother's identity and worked as a village school teacher in Stederdorf, today a district of the city of Peine in Lower Saxony, Germany for many years.

== History ==
Wilke was born in Hohensalza/ Posen in 1910. After studying Protestant theology in Erlangen and Greifswald with Adolf Schlatter. According to historian Saul Friedländer in his Nazi Germany and the Jews 1939-1945, Schlatter belonged to a "hard core of Jew haters".

Wilke joined the Nazi party in 1931 and in 1932 he joined the SA, the Nazi party's paramilitary wing. During late 1938, he joined the Sicherheitsdienst (SD), the intelligence agency of the SS. He was deployed with the Einsatzkommando's Sonderkommando 1005 (mobile killing squad) to Minsk, Belarus. In Minsk, he was appointed the Head of the Minsk anti-partisan center. As the German policy of the time was "All Jews are partisans and all partisans are Jews", he was chiefly responsible for the extermination of the Jews in Minsk and the region.

After the war in 1945, Wilke has gone into hiding and abandoned his first wife and three children. He assumed the identity of his deceased brother, Walter Wilke, and moved to Stederdorf. As Walter Wilke, he became the village's school teacher and remarried to the village doctor, Dr. Ursula Wilke. He was found and arrested in 1961.

=== Judgement ===
On 21 May 1963, he was sentenced by the Regional court in Koblenz for 10 years imprisonment for his "principal function" in six mass killing of at least 6,600 Jews. The conviction with the murder of 6,600 Jews out of many thousands came due to lack of information regarding those responsible specifically for the crimes in the region, even though the units participating were known. Eventually, he was convicted for his participation in the Slutsk affair and the liquidation of the Minsk Ghetto and the Pripyat Swamps operation. Wilke's diary, captured by the Red Army, and served as evidence in the trials, aided in his conviction. The diary included listing such as:

"Monday, February 8th 1943. 05:00, we start in the Ghetto for a very good stary, 1,300 Jews were extracted...later on, the region commander Karl decides to burn (300-400 more Jews come out of the bunkers" "Tuesday, March 9th 1943. The sun is shining, in the night I had that irritating scratch again"

In their judgement, the court judges wrote:

"Wilke is incapable of clear and straight thinking, he has a tendency to engage in escapes and excuses.". "[He is] fanatical and enthusiastic nationalist whose wrong-headed idealism was used and abused by the previous regime."

Wilke was released from prison in 1968, and died in 1989.
