= Chalice from Slutsk =

Lost 16th-century silver chalice from Belarus

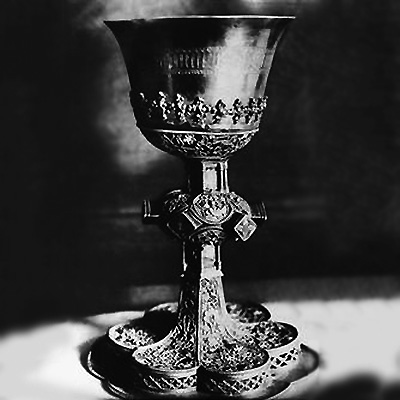
- The Chalice from Slutsk (photograph pre-1941)
- Artist: Unknown (possibly Kraków or Slutsk workshop)
- Year: 1580
- Type: Chalice
- Medium: Silver, gilding, enamel
- Dimensions: 22 cm (8.7 in)
- Location: Lost (formerly Belarusian State Museum, Minsk)

The Chalice from Slutsk (Belarusian: Пацір са Слуцка) was a silver ecclesiastical chalice originating from the Holy Trinity Monastery in Slutsk, Belarus. It is considered a significant example of 16th-century applied art in the Grand Duchy of Lithuania. The artifact was lost during World War II.

== History ==
The chalice was donated to the Slutsk Holy Trinity Monastery by Prince Yuri III Olelkovich (Jerzy Olelkowicz) in 1580. This was confirmed by a donation inscription engraved on the bottom of the base: "Yuri Yurievich Olelko Prince of Slutsk [1580] To the mon(astery) of the Holy Trinity Archima(ndry) of Slutsk".

In the 1860s, during the transfer of monastery valuables to Minsk, this inscription served as the justification for keeping the chalice in Slutsk, along with the Archimandrite's staff and the Gospel of Yuri Olelkovich.

In 1889, the chalice, staff, and Gospel were exhibited at the Moscow Archaeological Exhibition. It remained the property of the monastery until the 1920s. Subsequently, it entered the collection of the Slutsk Local History Museum and was later transferred to the Belarusian State Museum in Minsk. During World War II, the chalice, along with many other exhibits, was lost.

== Description ==
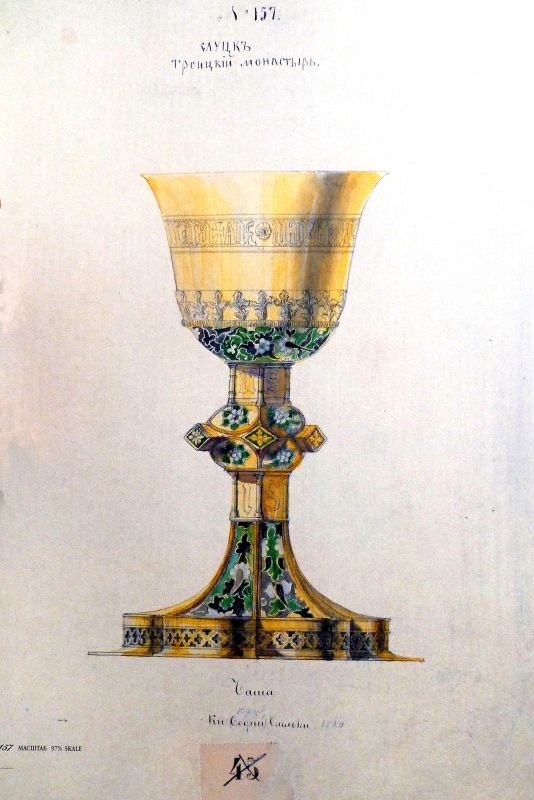
Drawing of the chalice by Dmitry Strukov

The chalice stood 22 cm (8.7 in) high. It was characterized by compositional balance and decorative restraint. Made of silver, it was subsequently gilded. The interior of the cup was gilded, while the exterior was decorated with filigree floral and geometric ornamental patterns.

Based on a drawing by the artist Dmitry Strukov, the decor was executed using enamel. Black, green, and grayish ornamental motifs contrasted with the golden surface. In the ornamentation, alongside Gothic cruciform flowers, there were flowers on stems with small leaves. Flowers of this character are also found on the oklads (covers) of Belarusian icons. This motif is particularly characteristic of Belarusian Polesia.

== Origins ==
The Polish researcher Maria Kałamajska-Saeed attributes the chalice to the masters of the Kraków art school, agreeing with the opinion of Józef Smoliński, who studied Slutsk antiquities in the early 20th century. The Slutsk chalice, which possesses stylistic features of the late Gothic, bears similarities to surviving works by Kraków jewelers of the 15th and 16th centuries. It may have arrived in Slutsk with Katarzyna Tęczyńska, daughter of the Kraków Voivode Stanisław Tęczyński, who became the wife of Prince Yuri II Olelkovich in 1558. Alternatively, the chalice could have been specially commissioned in Kraków, with which Slutsk had dynastic and cultural ties.

However, the Slutsk chalice differs from Polish examples by having stricter forms. Furthermore, there were sufficient metalworking masters (including non-ferrous metals) in Slutsk during the 16th–18th centuries, leaving the question of the chalice's authorship open.

== See also ==
- Slutsk Gospel
- Cross of Saint Euphrosyne

== Literature ==
- Марцэлеў, С. В., ed. (1987). Гісторыя беларускага мастацтва: У 6 т. Т. 1: Ад старажытных часоў да другой паловы XVI ст. [History of Belarusian Art: In 6 Vol. Vol. 1: From Ancient Times to the Second Half of the 16th Century] (in Belarusian). Мінск: Навука і тэхніка. p. 303.
