= Sluckis =

- Lithuanian surname
- m.: Sluckis
- f.: (unmarried): Sluckaitė
- f.: (married): Sluckienė

Sluckis is a Lithuanian-language form of the surname Slutsky. Notable people with the surname include:

- Aušra Marija Sluckaitė-Jurašienė, Lithuanian writer, literary critic, journalist
- Mykolas Sluckis (1928–2013) Lithuanian writer
