= Sergey Voychenko =

Ukrainian-born Belarusian artist

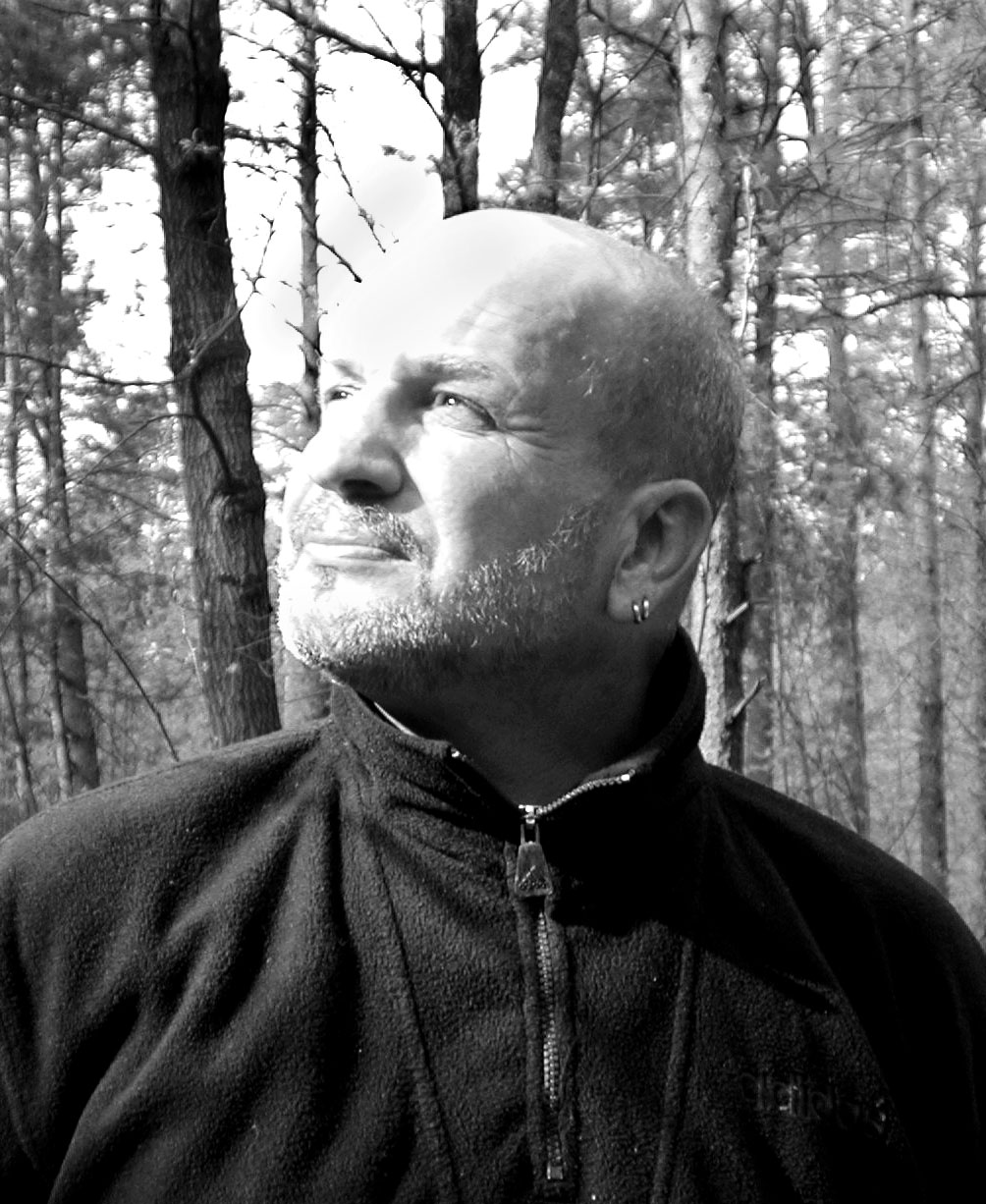

Sergey Voychenko (Belarusian: Сяргей Войчанка, Siarhiej Vojchanka; Russian: Серге́й Войченко) (15 November 1955 – 9 December 2004) was a Belarusian artist and designer known for his creative posters and photography art work together with his partner Vladimir Tsesler.

Sergey Voychenko was born in Mariupol, Ukraine but his family moved to Minsk, Belarus (where his family roots were) when he was four years old. In 1969 he enrolled in an art school where he studied art and sculpture, and in 1975 got accepted to the Belarusian Art Academy, the department of design, where he met his future co-author Vladimir Tsesler. He got his first award for posters in 1984 for a series of posters called "History of Minsk."

Voychenko and Tsesler exhibited at the State Russian Museum in 2000.

In autumn 2004, Voychenko had a heart bypass surgery, but died only two months later. One month before his death, Voychenko and Tsesler had another exhibition on Montmartre in Paris.
