= Eliyahu Feinstein =

Jewish rabbi

Eliyahu Halevi Feinstein, also known as Reb Elye Pruzhaner, (b. Slutsk, Russia 1843 - d. Pruzhany, 1929), was a leading Litvak rabbinic authority of his time.

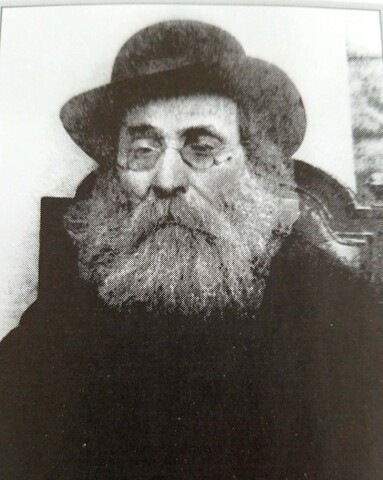
Reb Elye Pruzhaner

== Education ==
Feinstein was born in Slutsk, in the Minsk Governorate of the Russian Empire (present-day Belarus), in 1843. In 1851-1852, aged ten years old, he became the pupil of Rabbi Joseph Feimer ("Reb Yossele Slutzker") in Slutsk. Afterwards he continued his studies at the Volozhin Yeshiva, then led by the Netziv.

== Rabbinate ==
Feinstein held many rabbinical posts during his life, but always on one condition: that he be free from non-urgent community concerns until noon every day, so he could study Torah uninterrupted. He became rabbi of Starobin in 1863, of Kletsk in 1867, and of Karelitz in 1873. He was then rabbi of Chaslovitz. His final position was as rabbi of Pruzhany. He was called Rabbi Elya Pruzhaner from that time forward. It was in the time that he was rabbi in Pruzhany that he was often called to serve on a Bet Din for Lyakhovichi. Although he received many offers to be Rav of larger cities, he preferred to stay in Pruzhany. The town of Pruzhany was one of four so called "Karpes" cities in which the Hasidim did not gain a foothold.

He was twice offered the Chief Rabbinate of Israel, but each time turned it down. Possible reasons for his declination are the need to find proper suitors for his unwed daughters, or unwillingness to become entangled in the politics of the Holy Land. When this position was instead taken by Abraham Isaac Kook, Yosef Chaim Sonnenfeld expressed his regret over Reb Elye's decision.

== Family ==
Feinstein was married to Guta Davidovitch, a descendant of a long line of rabbis in the town of Kopyl. Reb Elye's brothers-in-law included Rabbi Yaakov Kantarovich, and Rabbi David Feinstein, father of Rabbi Moshe Feinstein. David Feinstein, Reb Moshe's father, was chosen by Reb Elye as a groom for his sister-in-law, on condition that R. David abandon his Hasidic practices, and agree to study in the Volozhin Yeshiva for four years. Reb Elye's daughters married famous Torah scholars. His oldest daughter married Menachem Krakowski, author of the Avodat ha-Melech on Maimonides' Mishneh Torah. His next daughter married Moshe Soloveitchik, father of Joseph B. Soloveitchik. A third daughter married Dovid Feigenbaum who succeeded Reb Elye as rabbi of Pruzhany. Reb Elye's youngest daughter married Eliezer Meisels, grandson of Eliyahu Chaim Meisels, Rabbi of Lodz.

== Legacy ==
Feinstein dealt with many critical issues facing the Jewish community at the time. He proposed instituting vocational training within the yeshivos, but was unsuccessful.

Feinstein's approach to Talmud was influenced by the Vilna Gaon. He sought clear and logical explanations over complicated pilpul. Of his many writings only one part has been published, under the title Halichot Eliyahu.

He died on October 31, 1929, and was eulogized throughout the Jewish world.

== Sources ==
- http://www.eilatgordinlevitan.com/volozhin/vol_pages/vol_yes_stu.html
- The Soloveitchik Heritage: A Daughter's Memoir, By Shulamit Soloveitchik Meiselman
- The Rav: The World of Rabbi Joseph B. Soloveitchik, Volume 1, By Aaron Rakeffet-Rothkoff
- http://www.shtetlinks.jewishgen.org/lyakhovichi/Rabbonim.htm
- http://www.jewishgen.org/Yizkor/slutsk/slu228.html
- http://www.jewishgen.org/Yizkor/slutsk/slu246.html
- http://jewishencyclopedia.com/view.jsp?artid=571&letter=P&search=pruzhany

פנקס פרוז'אני והסביבה : עדות וזכרון לקהלות שהושמדו בשואה. פרידלנדר, יוסף,1983
