= Slutsk =

Town in Minsk Region, Belarus

Slutsk Слуцк
- Town
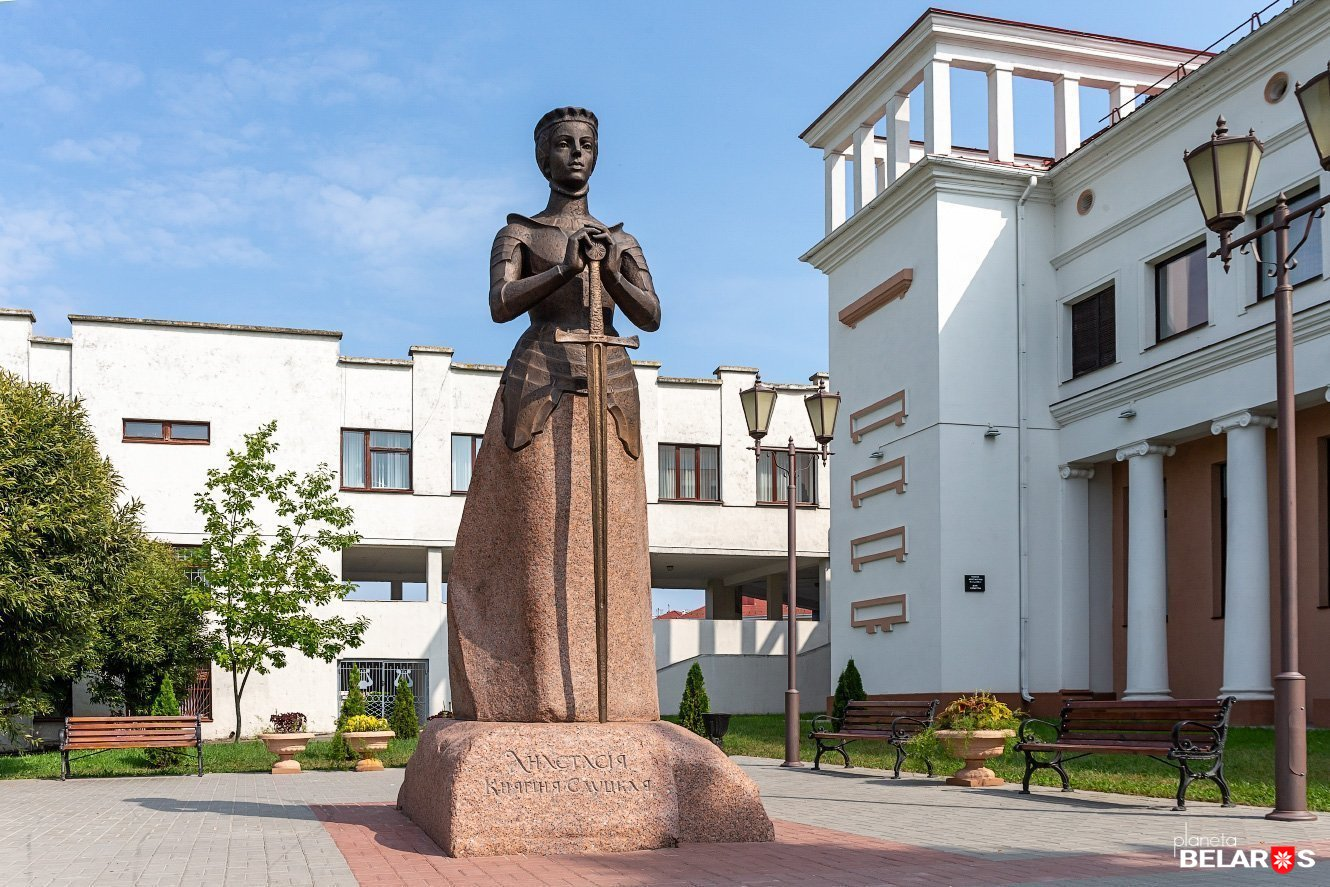
- Memorial to Princess Anastasia Slutskaya

- Flag Coat of arms

- Location within Belarus
- Coordinates: 53°02′N 27°34′E
- Country: Belarus
- Region: Minsk Region
- District: Slutsk District
- Founded: 1116

Area
  - Total: 24.6 km^{2} (9.5 sq mi)
- Elevation: 250 m (820 ft)

Population (2026)
  - Total: 58,995
  - Density: 2,400/km^{2} (6,210/sq mi)
- Time zone: UTC+3 (MSK)
- Postal code: 223610
- Area code: +375 1795
- License plate: 5
- Website: Official website

Slutsk (Note: Belarusian: Слуцк, romanized: Sluck; Russian: Слуцк; Polish: Słuck, Lithuanian: Sluckas, Yiddish/Hebrew: סלוצק.) is a town in Minsk Region, in central Belarus. It serves as the administrative center of Slutsk District, and is located on the Sluch River 105 km (65 mi) south of the capital Minsk. As of 2026, it has a population of 58,995.

== Geography ==
The city is situated in the south-west of Minsk Region, 26 km (16 mi) north of Salihorsk.

=== Climate ===
Climate data for Slutsk (1991–2020)
Month	Jan	Feb	Mar	Apr	May	Jun	Jul	Aug	Sep	Oct	Nov	Dec	Year
Record high °C (°F)	4.5 (40.1)	5.7 (42.3)	13.7 (56.7)	22.9 (73.2)	27.4 (81.3)	29.9 (85.8)	31.6 (88.9)	31.3 (88.3)	26.4 (79.5)	20.0 (68.0)	12.3 (54.1)	6.4 (43.5)	31.6 (88.9)
Mean daily maximum °C (°F)	−1.6 (29.1)	−0.4 (31.3)	5.2 (41.4)	13.6 (56.5)	19.4 (66.9)	22.8 (73.0)	24.8 (76.6)	24.4 (75.9)	18.4 (65.1)	11.3 (52.3)	4.3 (39.7)	−0.2 (31.6)	11.8 (53.2)
Daily mean °C (°F)	−4.1 (24.6)	−3.4 (25.9)	0.9 (33.6)	8.0 (46.4)	13.6 (56.5)	17.1 (62.8)	19.0 (66.2)	18.2 (64.8)	12.9 (55.2)	7.0 (44.6)	1.8 (35.2)	−2.5 (27.5)	7.4 (45.3)
Mean daily minimum °C (°F)	−6.8 (19.8)	−6.4 (20.5)	−2.8 (27.0)	2.8 (37.0)	7.8 (46.0)	11.3 (52.3)	13.2 (55.8)	12.3 (54.1)	7.9 (46.2)	3.4 (38.1)	−0.5 (31.1)	−4.8 (23.4)	3.1 (37.6)
Record low °C (°F)	−20.5 (−4.9)	−18.4 (−1.1)	−11.9 (10.6)	−3.6 (25.5)	0.4 (32.7)	4.6 (40.3)	7.8 (46.0)	6.1 (43.0)	0.3 (32.5)	−4.5 (23.9)	−9.8 (14.4)	−15.7 (3.7)	−20.5 (−4.9)
Average precipitation mm (inches)	41.2 (1.62)	34.6 (1.36)	37.5 (1.48)	36.8 (1.45)	64.1 (2.52)	79.7 (3.14)	88.8 (3.50)	61.1 (2.41)	47.3 (1.86)	49.7 (1.96)	43.0 (1.69)	44.1 (1.74)	627.9 (24.72)
Average precipitation days (≥ 1.0 mm)	10.5	9.1	8.8	7.5	9.8	9.5	10.3	7.3	7.4	8.5	9.7	10.6	109.0
Source: NOAA

== History ==
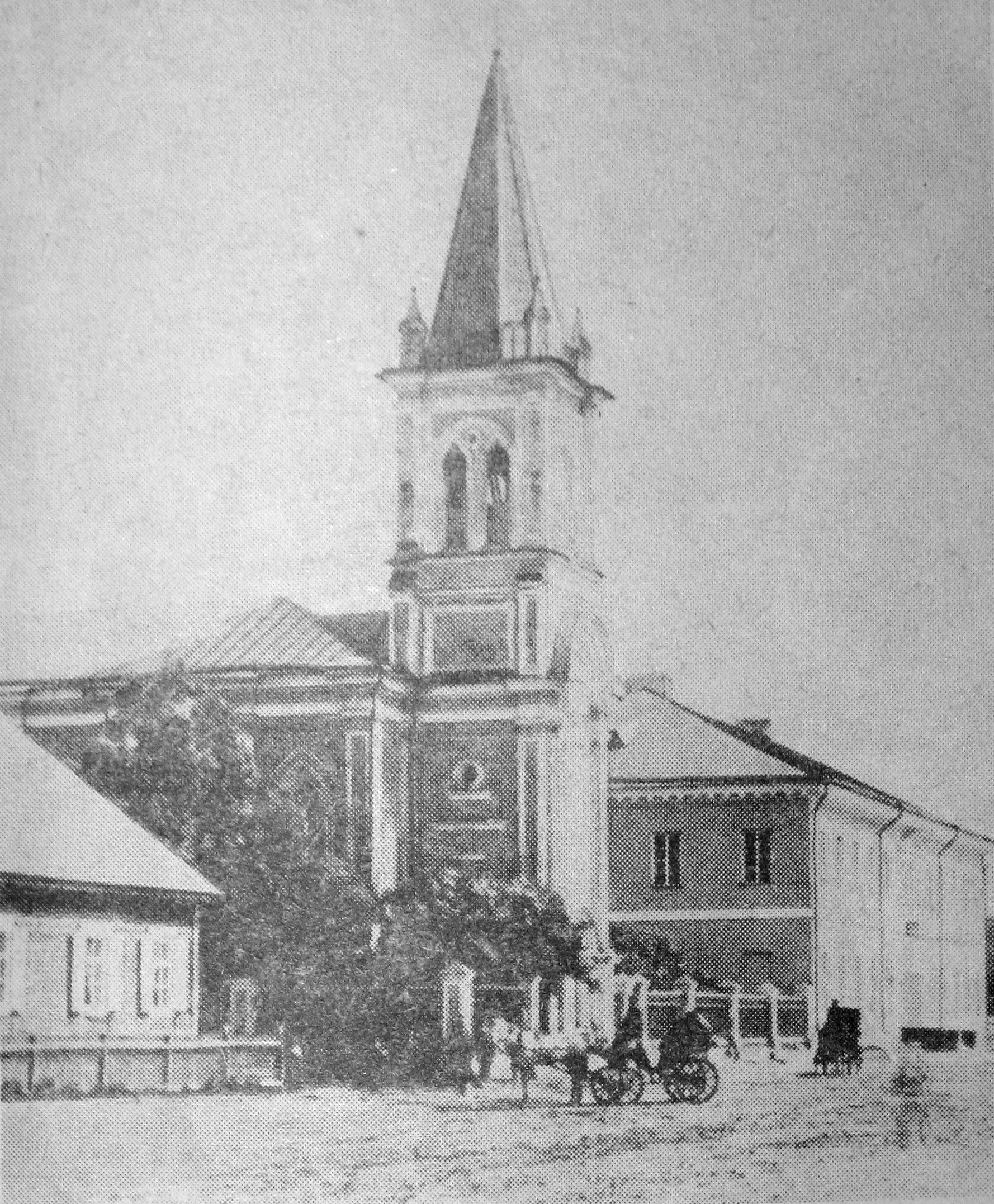
Early 20th-century view of the Calvinist Church and high school

Slutsk was first mentioned in writing in 1116. It was initially part of the Principality of Turov and Pinsk but in 1160 became the capital of a separate principality. From 1320–1330, it was part of the domain of the Grand Duchy of Lithuania. Casimir IV Jagiellon vested it with Magdeburg town rights in 1441. It was a private town, owned by the Olelkovich and Radziwiłł families, which transformed it into a center of the Polish Reformed Church with a gymnasium and a strong fortress.

The first Jewish residents arrived by the late 16th century, expanding in population over the following centuries until the town was majority Jewish from the 19th century until World War II. In the mid-17th century, Scottish immigrants settled in the town.

Following the 17th century, the city became famous for manufacturing kontusz belts, some of the most expensive and luxurious pieces of garment of the szlachta. Because of the popularity of the cloths made here, belts worn over the żupan were often called of Slutsk despite their real place of origin.

In 1778, it became a county seat within the Nowogródek Voivodeship. Slutsk was part of the Russian Empire after the Second Partition of Poland in 1793. It was occupied by Germany in 1918 and by Poland between 1919 and 1920 during Polish–Soviet War. In 1920, it was the centre of a major anti-bolshevik uprising known as the Slutsk defence action.

Until World War II and the Slutsk Affair, the city was predominantly Jewish; however, now the population includes no more than 100 Jews.

Slutsk was occupied by the German Army on 26 June 1941, and placed under the administration of Reichskommissariat Ostland. The Germans operated the Stalag 341 prisoner-of-war camp and a subcamp of the Stalag 337 POW camp in the city. The period of German occupation ended on 30 June 1944, when troops of the 1st Belorussian Front recaptured the town during the Minsk Offensive of the Red Army.

On 2 October 1967, a riot occurred during which the local court building was set on fire, resulting in the death of a judge and a police officer. The riot, unprecedented in post-WW2 Soviet Belarus, was triggered by the conduct of a murder trial, which was perceived to be unjust by the local residents.

=== Jewish community ===
The first indication of Jews in Slutsk is from 1583 when the city was part of Lithuania. Formal recognition came in 1601. By 1623, Jews owned 16 homes. In 1691, Slutsk became one of the five leading communities of the Lithuanian Jewish Council. By 1750 there were 1,593 Jewish people, accounting for one third of the population. In economic life, Jewish people were concentrated in commerce; three-fourths of the town's merchants were Jewish, and a similar share of people in the alcohol business were Jewish. After annexation by Russia in 1793, growth of the city slowed, in part due to it being bypassed by the railroad. By 1897 the Jewish community numbered 10,264 inhabitants, or 77% of the city population. They played a central role in the city's markets, particularly in agricultural produce.

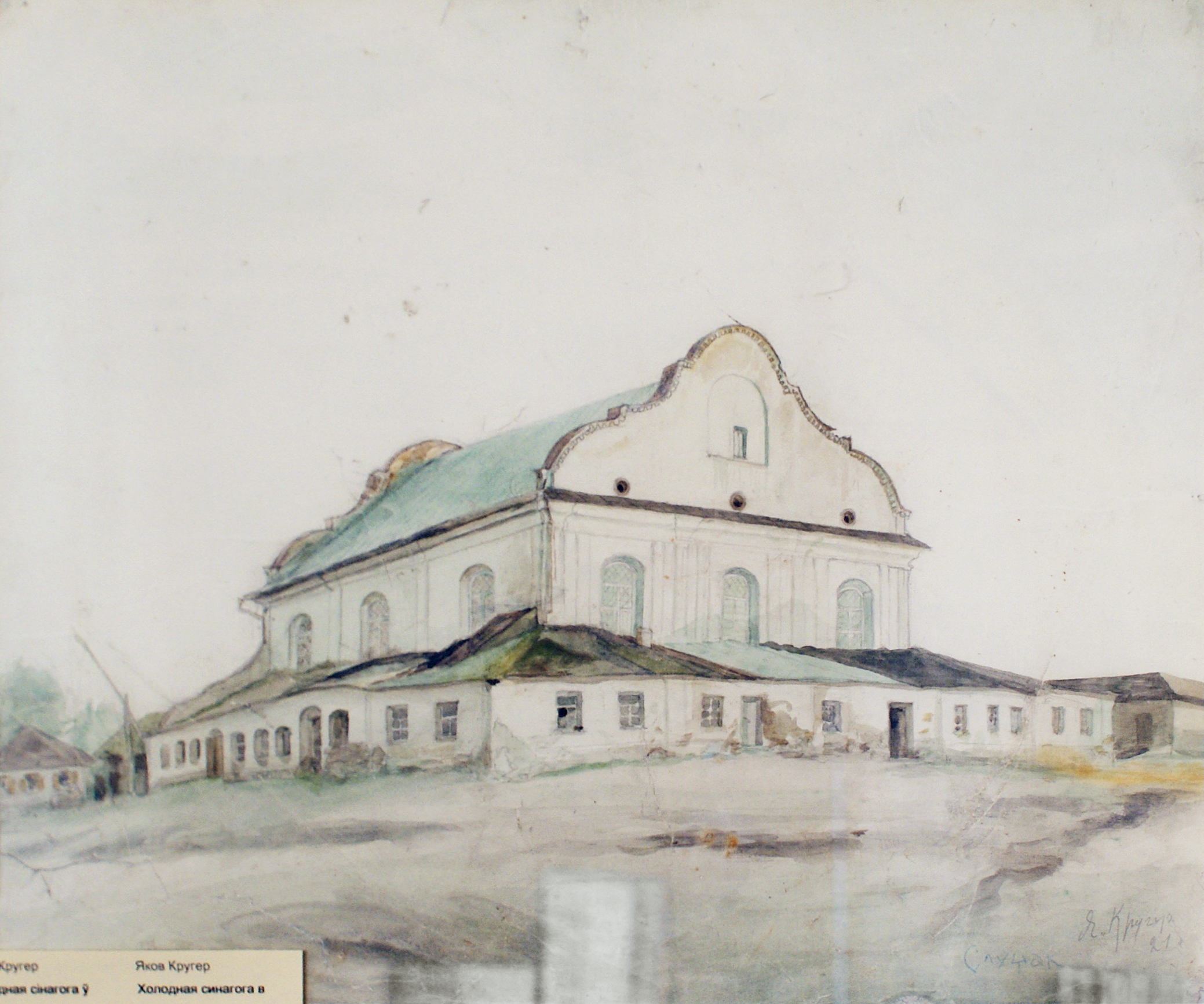
Cold Synagogue (Y. Krouger, 1921)

Slutsk was important in terms of Torah study. Among the rabbinic figures who served there were Yehudah Leib Pohovitser, Chayim ha-Kohen Rapoport, Yosef Dov Ber Soloveichik (1865–1874), and Isser Zalman Meltzer. The famous Slutsk-Kletsk Yeshiva was founded in Slutsk in 1883 by Rabbi Yaakov Dovid Wilovsky. Another outstanding scholar of learning in the Talmud and Torah who was also a Hebrew poet and became a Hebrew educator in the United States was Ephraim Eliezer Lisitzky, who was born and grew to his teens in Slutsk before emigrating to the U.S. According to legend the Baal Shem Tov visited Slutsk in 1733 at the invitation of Shmuel Ickowicz. Despite this, the town was known for its anti-hasidic misnagdim. The Haskalah and modern Jewish political parties also were represented among the population.

=== Massacre of Jews ===
During the German occupation of Slutsk, the Jewish inhabitants were systematically targeted for killing. The first Jewish victims were killed in the garden on Monakhov Street during the initial days immediately following the arrival of the Germans on 27 June 1941. The victims numbered between 70 and 120, according to different sources.

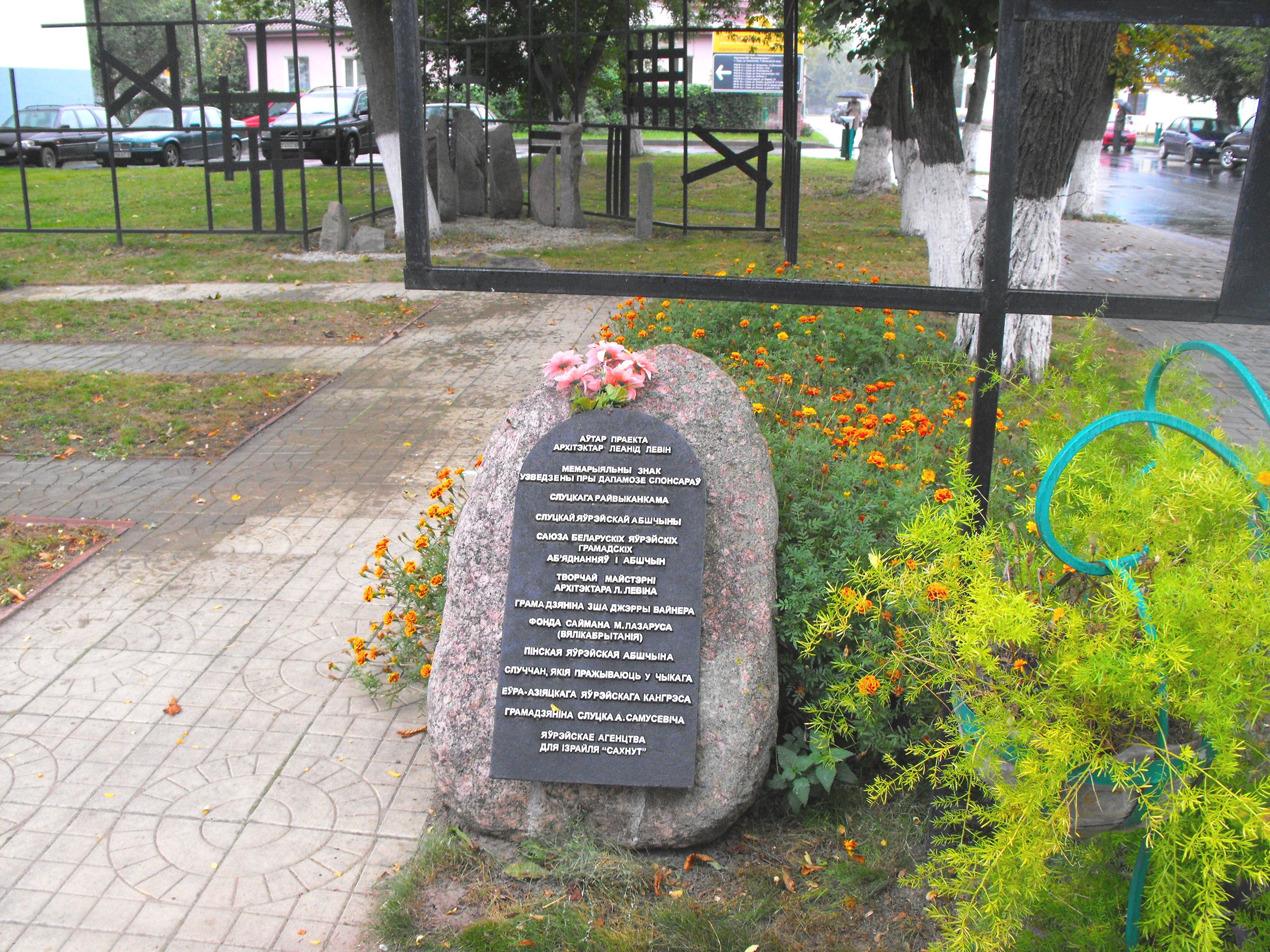
Memorial to Holocaust victims

Four months later, on 27 and 28 October 1941, one of the largest single massacres occurred, known as the Slutsk affair, when Jews were herded towards pits in the Gorovakha ravine, approximately 10 km (6.2 mi) west of Slutsk, where they were shot. According to German sources the total number of victims was 3,400, while Soviet sources cite 8,000. These killings were carried out by two companies of the German 11th Reserve Order Police Battalion and the Lithuanian 2nd Battalion, which was a German-sponsored Schutzmannschaft or Auxiliary Police formation established in Kaunas, soon after the Nazi occupation of Lithuania.

A further massacre was carried out over several days during the spring of 1942, when the inhabitants of the "field ghetto" of Slutsk were taken to the forest near the village of Bezverkhovichi, 10 km (6.2 mi) west of Slutsk, where they were shot or murdered in gas vans. According to survivors, the victims were driven to the execution site in two to four trucks on Mondays and Saturdays. The last Jews of the field ghetto were murdered on the Passover, 2–3 April 1942. The total number of Jews murdered at Bezverkhovichi is estimated to have been between 3,000 and 4,000.

One of the last significant massacres of Jews occurred on 8 February 1943, with the liquidation of the "town ghetto" of Slutsk. The Jews were driven in trucks to the former estate of Mokhart, popularly called Mokharty, 5 km (3.1 mi) east of Slutsk, where they were shot from behind in mass graves by personnel of the Minsk security police office. During the liquidation, some Jews fought back, shooting at the German and Latvian soldiers. In response, the Germans burnt the ghetto to the ground. Postwar court proceedings cite a minimum of 1,600 victims, of which 1,200 were murdered at the graves at Mokharty, the rest in the ghetto itself.

=== Attractions ===
==== Museum of Slutsk Belts ====
The Museum of the History of Slutsk Belts is dedicated to the symbol of the city – a woven garment with incredibly beautiful patterns, using gold and silver threads. The museum is open to visitors every day except Monday.

==== Church of St. Anthony and Monastery of St. Francis ====
The church was consecrated in 2000 by Cardinal Kazimierz Sviontak, a very important figure for Catholic believers and the first Belarusian cardinal. Not only is the church active – the monastery is also active. While strolling nearby, you're likely to encounter the nuns who live there.The only decoration on the church's façade are the stained-glass windows. The interior of the church is austere, decorated primarily with wooden sculptures and bas-reliefs. A functioning monastery is located adjacent to the church.

==== St. Michael's Cathedral ====
This church is the oldest surviving church in the city. The first mentions of this monument of Belarusian wooden architecture date back to the 14th century, and it was reconstructed in the 18th century. The church is entirely wooden, combining classical and baroque features.

==== Monument to Saint Sophia ====
The monument was unveiled on September 24, 2000, in a park on M. Bogdanovich Street. The monument is dedicated to the last representative of the ancient princely family of Olelkovich-Slutsky, Sophia Slutskaya, who was canonized by the Belarusian Orthodox Church in 1984.

The monument was designed by sculptor Mikhail Inkov and architect Nikolai Lukyanchik. The monument consists of a bronze figure of the saint, as well as a tall arch behind the princess, consisting of three "petals." A key detail in the composition is the gesture of Sophia's left hand. It urges us to pause and reflect for a moment on the transience of existence, on the purpose and life of man. The white arch behind her symbolizes the Christian church.

==== Chapel of the Great Martyr Barbara ====
Documentary records indicate that the Church of St. Barbara formerly stood on the site of the chapel in Slutsk. At the end of the 18th century, it was severely damaged in a fire and destroyed. The church's name and all that survived were transferred to a new church, which was rebuilt in a cemetery in another part of the city. The new church stood until it suffered the same fate as the first. In 1962, the church burned down. In 1996, a wooden chapel dedicated to St. Barbara was built on the site of the original shrine.

== Notable people ==
- Isaac Dov Berkowitz – Jewish and Israeli author
- Eliyahu Feinstein – rabbinic authority
- Yerucham Gorelick - rabbinic authority
- Yaakov Yosef Herman – Orthodox Jewish pioneer in America
- Maurice Hindus – Jewish-American writer and lecturer
- Semyon Kosberg – Jewish Soviet engineer
- Shneur Kotler – rosh yeshiva, Lakewood yeshiva
- Boruch Ber Leibowitz – leading rosh yeshiva
- Isser Zalman Meltzer – Rabbi of Slutsk from 1903 to 1923
- Artur Nepokoychitsky (1813–1881) – Imperial Russian military leader
- Anastasiya Prokopenko – world champion and Olympic bronze medalist in modern pentathlon
- Gregory Razran (1901–1973) – Russian American psychologist
- Princess Sophia of Slutsk – medieval Eastern Orthodox saint
- Fabijan Šantyr (1887–1920) – Belarusian poet, writer and public figure who is regarded as “the first victim of [the Bolsheviks] in…Belarusian politics and literature”
- Edward Sperling – Jewish writer and humorist
- Mikola Statkevich – Belarusian politician
- Meyer Waxman – Rabbi and author
- Mikhail Yakimovich – Belarusian handball player
- Lidia Yermoshina – Belarusian politician
- Shaul Yisraeli – religious Zionist rabbi
- Yurka Gavruk (1905–1979). Belarusian translator and poet. He translated from French, English, German, and Polish into Belarusian. He authored a collection of local history stories, "Vyaskovyya Ryskі." He also authored the first collection of poetry translations in Belarus.
- Vladimir Tsesler (born 1951). Belarusian artist and designer. He participated in the development of the Russian-Belarusian city car project, the Yo-mobile.
- Galina Bartashevich (born 1932). Belarusian folklorist. His research focuses on Belarusian folklore, folklore from the Great Patriotic War, children's folklore, calendar-ritual folklore, and non-ritual folklore in modern times. He has authored over 300 scientific papers.
- Viktor Gruzinsky (1933–1997). Belarusian physicist. His scientific works focus on the spectroscopy of complex molecules, quantum electronics, and nonlinear optics. He made significant contributions to the study of molecular vapor luminescence and the development of dye and gas lasers.
- Alexander Rubanov (1936–2003) was a Belarusian physicist. His scientific works focus on laser physics, optical holography, and physical optics. He made significant contributions to the understanding of dynamic holography processes. He is the author of 35 patents and approximately 300 scientific papers.
- Yazep Dyla (1880–1973) was a Belarusian novelist, playwright, and public and cultural figure. His first literary publication appeared in 1912 in the newspaper Nasha Niva. In his articles on cultural history, he explored the origins of Belarusian theater.
- Kondraty Korsalin (1809–1883) was an artist and academician of landscape painting. He participated in the decoration of the Cathedral of St. Mary Magdalene in Warsaw. Four of Korsalin's works from the 1840s are held in the National Art Museum of the Republic of Belarus.
- Oleg Belousov (1945–2009) was a Belarusian animator, screenwriter, and director. He was the founder and artistic director of the cartoon workshop at the Belarusfilm studio and the ABC animation studios. He was the author of the book "My City" and the poetry collection "Kazantip Notebook."
- Alexander Chirkin (born 1943) Belarusian biochemist. Doctor of Biological Sciences. Research interests include radiation-environmental dyslipoproteinemia, radiation-induced atherosclerosis, and the theory and methodology of ultrasound therapy.
- Anatoly Kartashevich (born 1949). Belarusian scientist specializing in thermal engines. Author of over 730 scientific and methodological works, including 8 monographs. Author of 155 patents for inventions, some of which have been implemented in engine manufacturing plants in the CIS countries.
- Rostislav Platonov (1930 – 2001). Belarusian historian, archaeographer, and publicist. He studied the Great Patriotic War and the fates of those repressed in the 1930s–1950s. Author and co-author of over 60 books and nearly 400 scientific, popular science, and scientific journalism articles.

== Twin towns – sister cities ==
Slutsk is twinned with:

- Brovary Raion, Ukraine
- Kalevalsky District, Russia
- Moshenskoy District, Russia
- Ryazansky (Moscow), Russia
- Rzhev, Russia
- Serpukhovsky District, Russia
- Shaki, Azerbaijan
- Sisian, Armenia
- Staromaynsky District, Russia

Former twin towns:

- Tczew, Poland

On 8 March 2022, the Polish city of Tczew ended its partnership with Slutsk as a response to the Belarusian involvement in the 2022 Russian invasion of Ukraine.

== Gallery ==
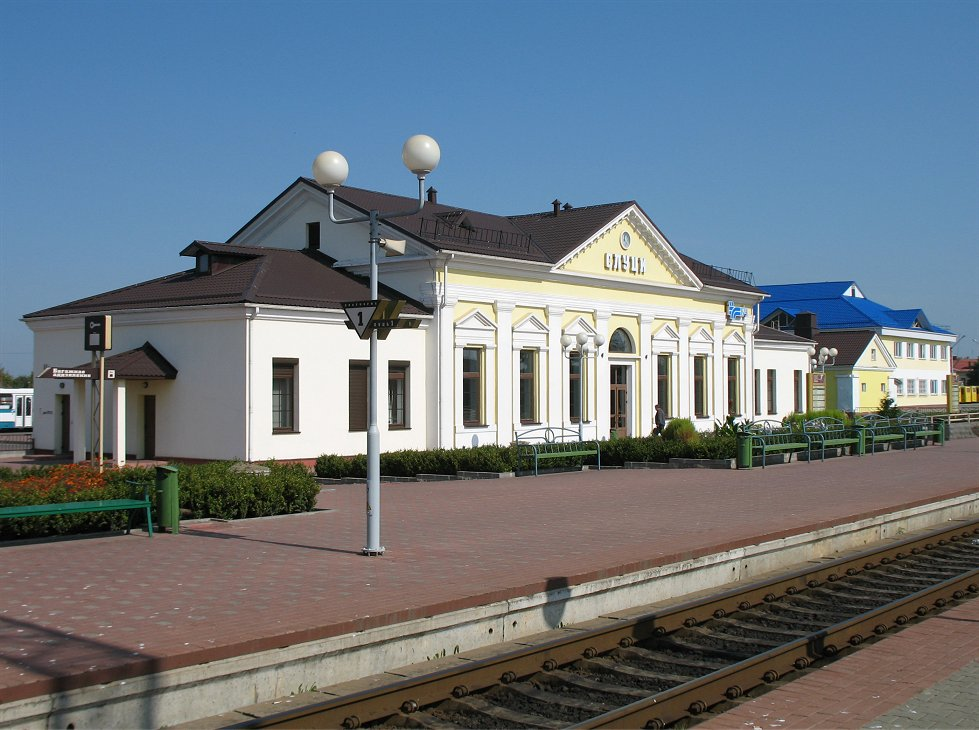
Slutsk train station

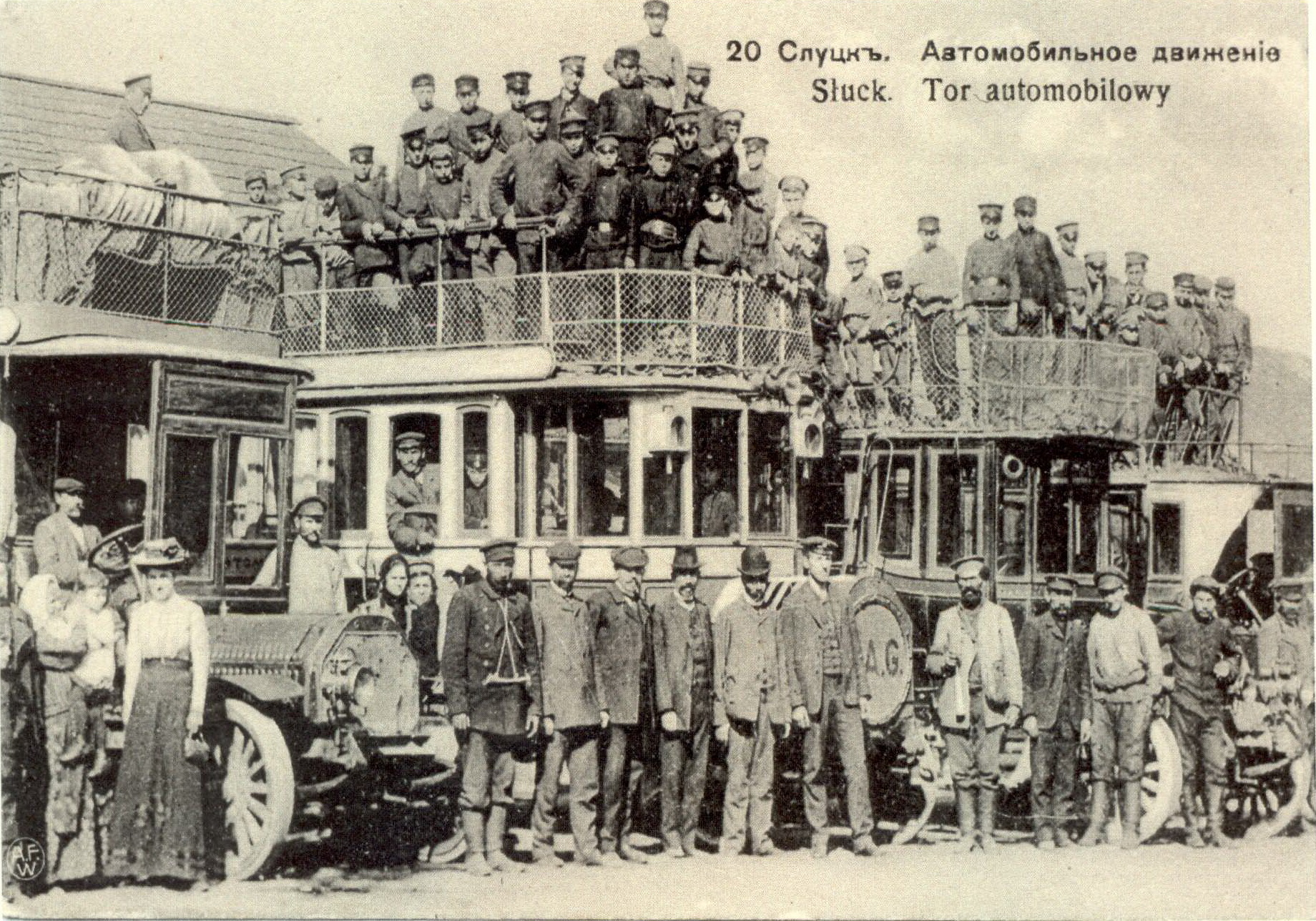
Slutsk bus depot in the 1920s

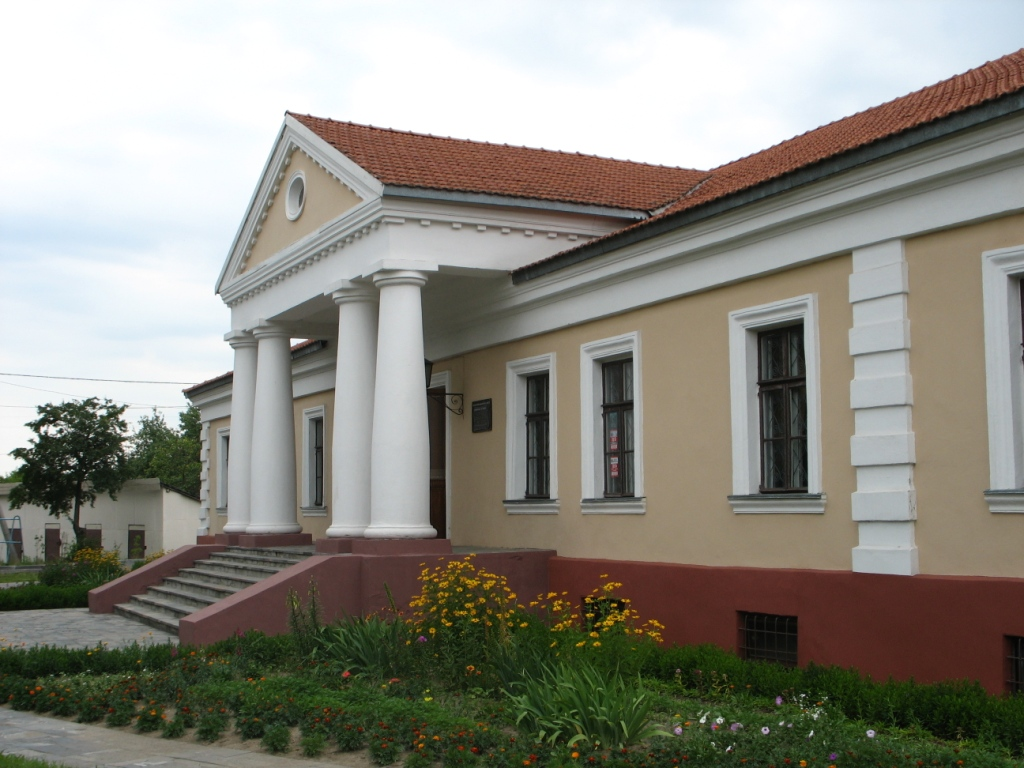
Slutsk Homeland Museum

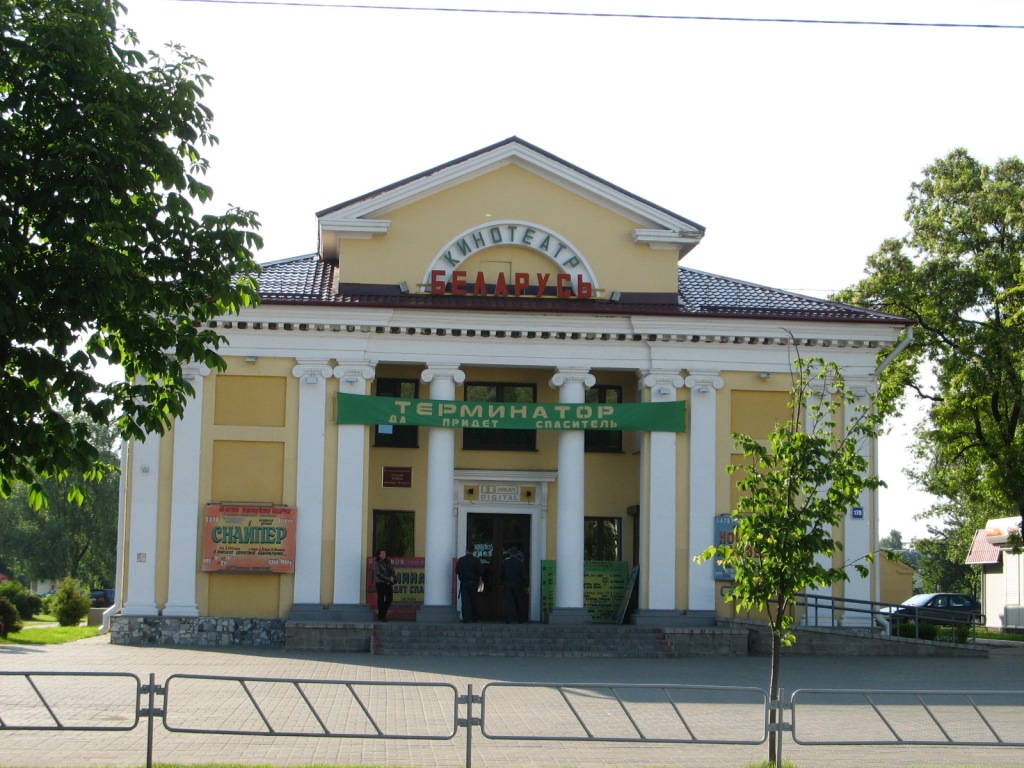
Cinema-Theatre "Belarus"

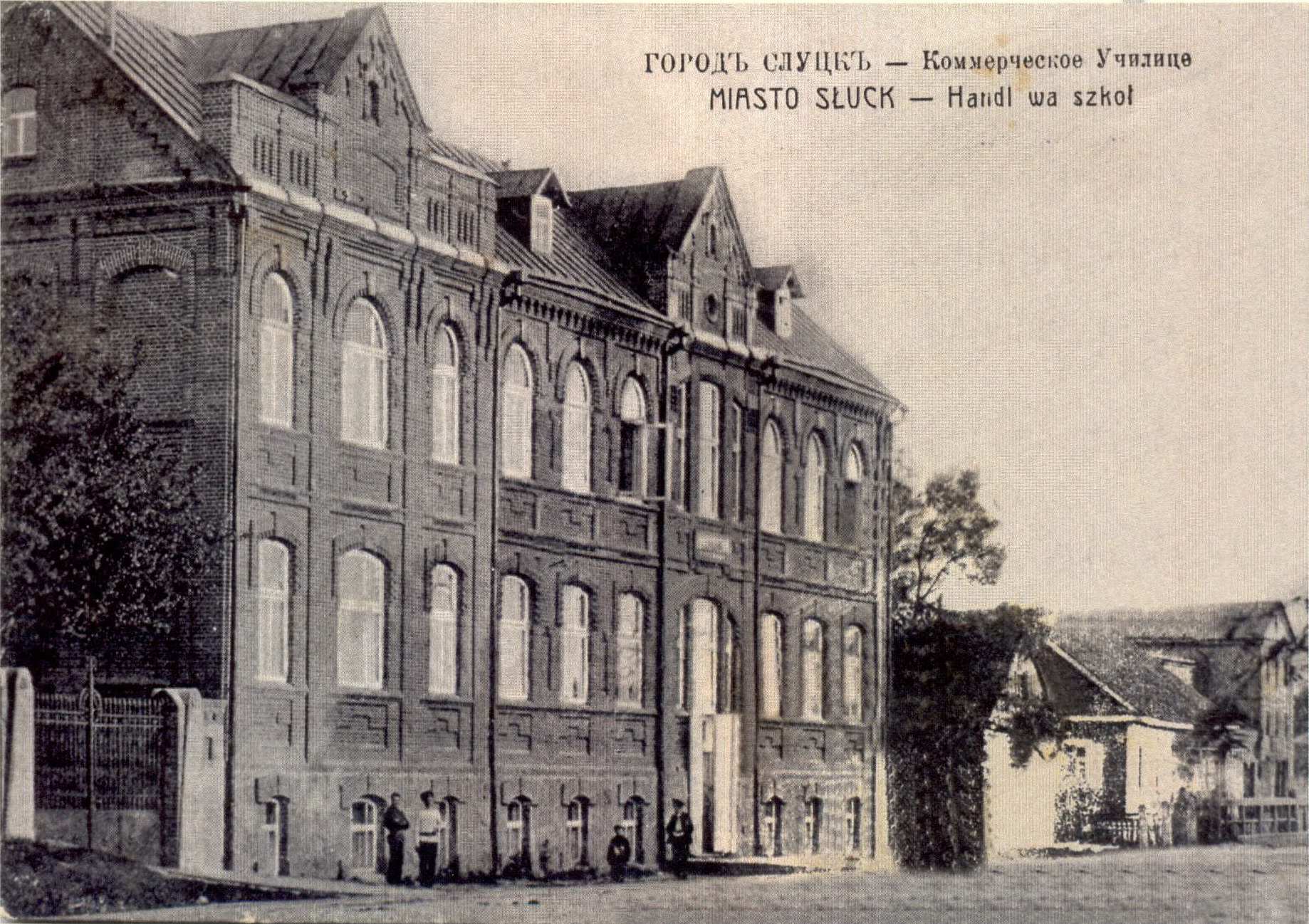
Commercial college

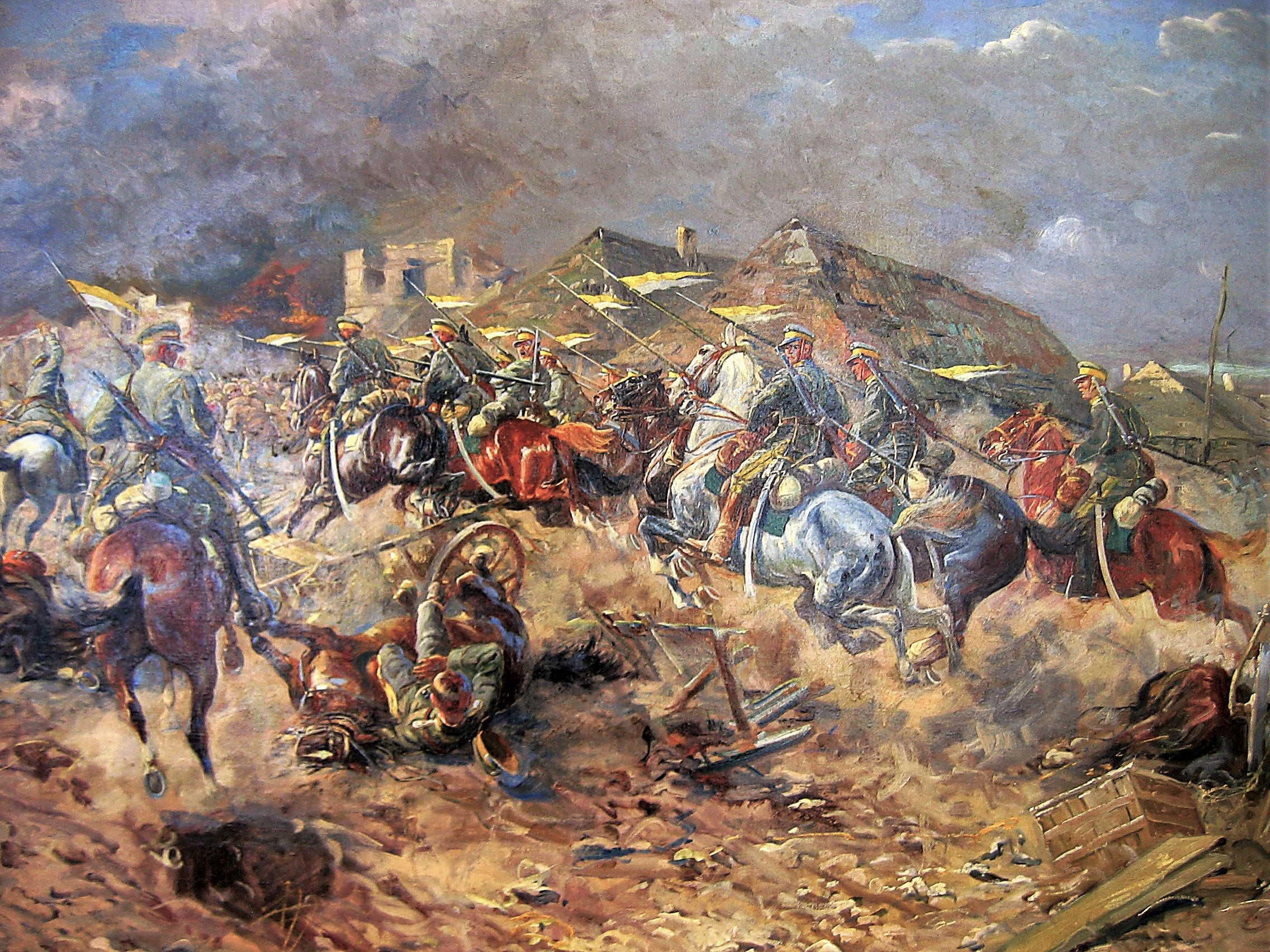
Painting of the Slutsk Defence Action

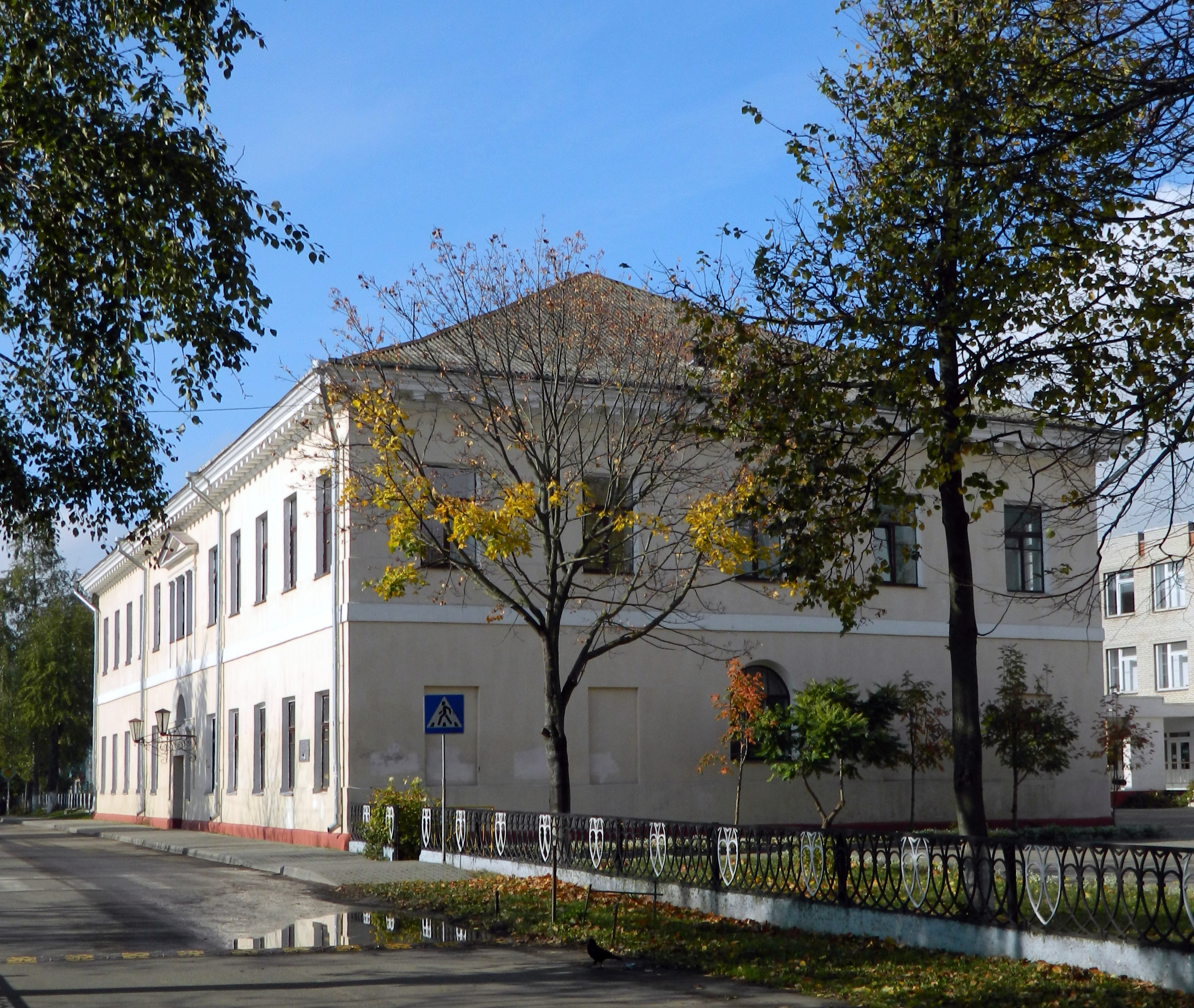
Slutsk high school

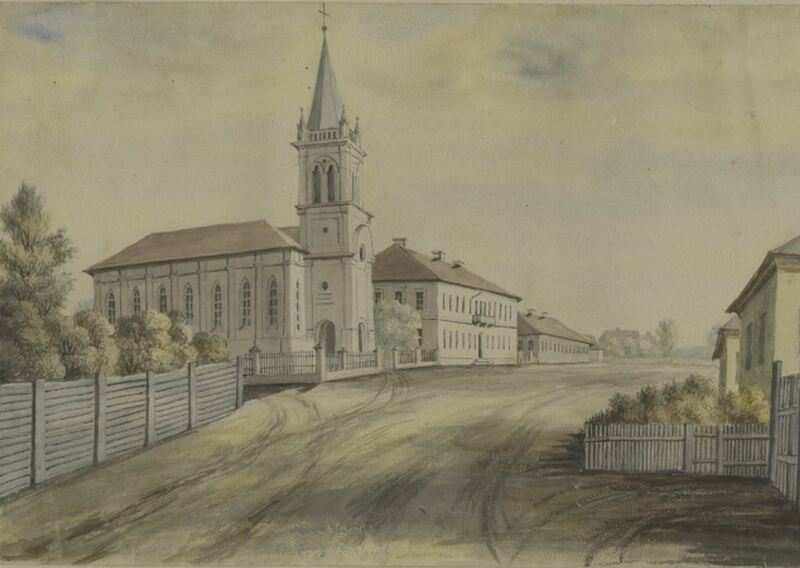
The high school, "The oldest school in Slutsk"

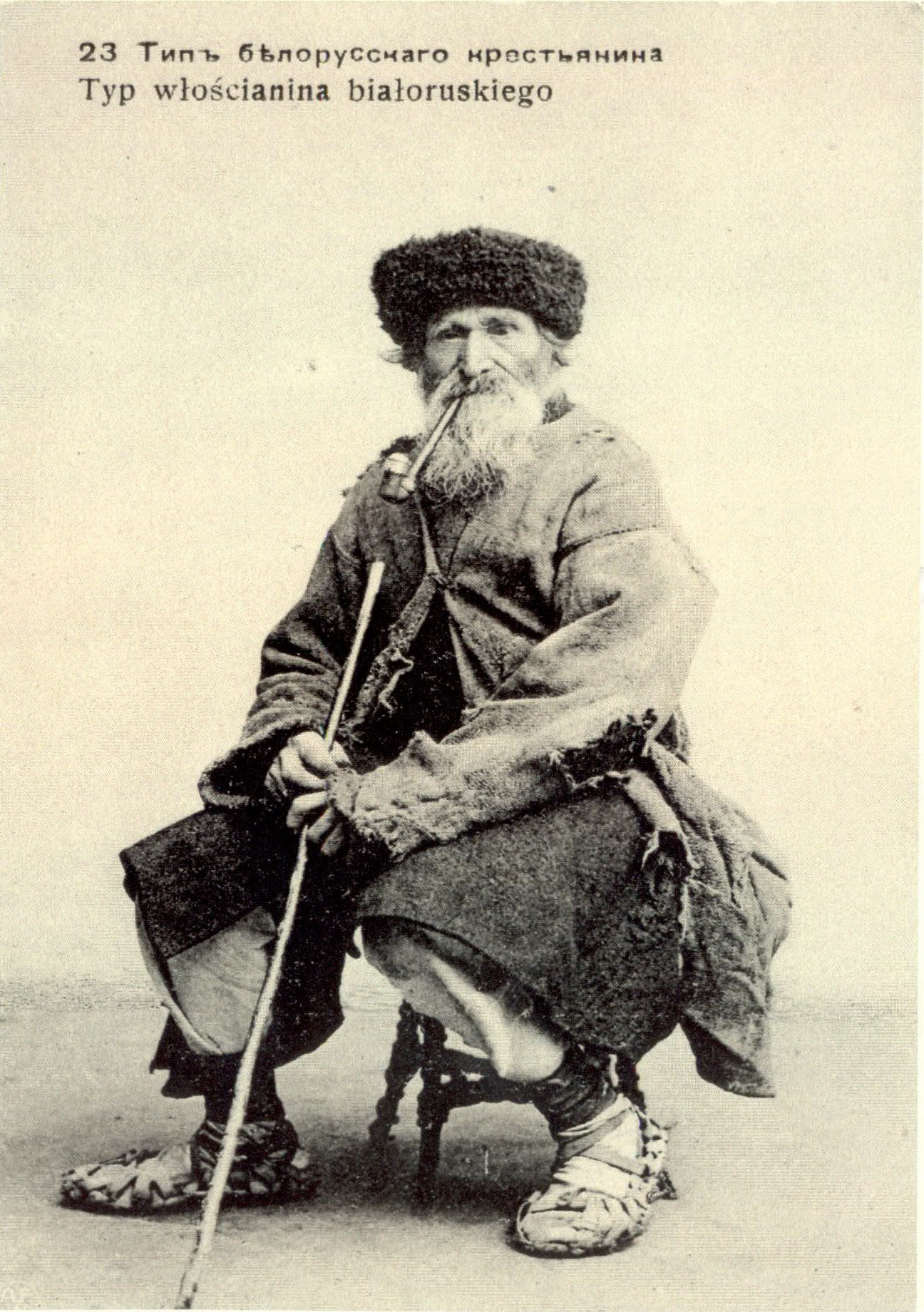
Native Belarusian man

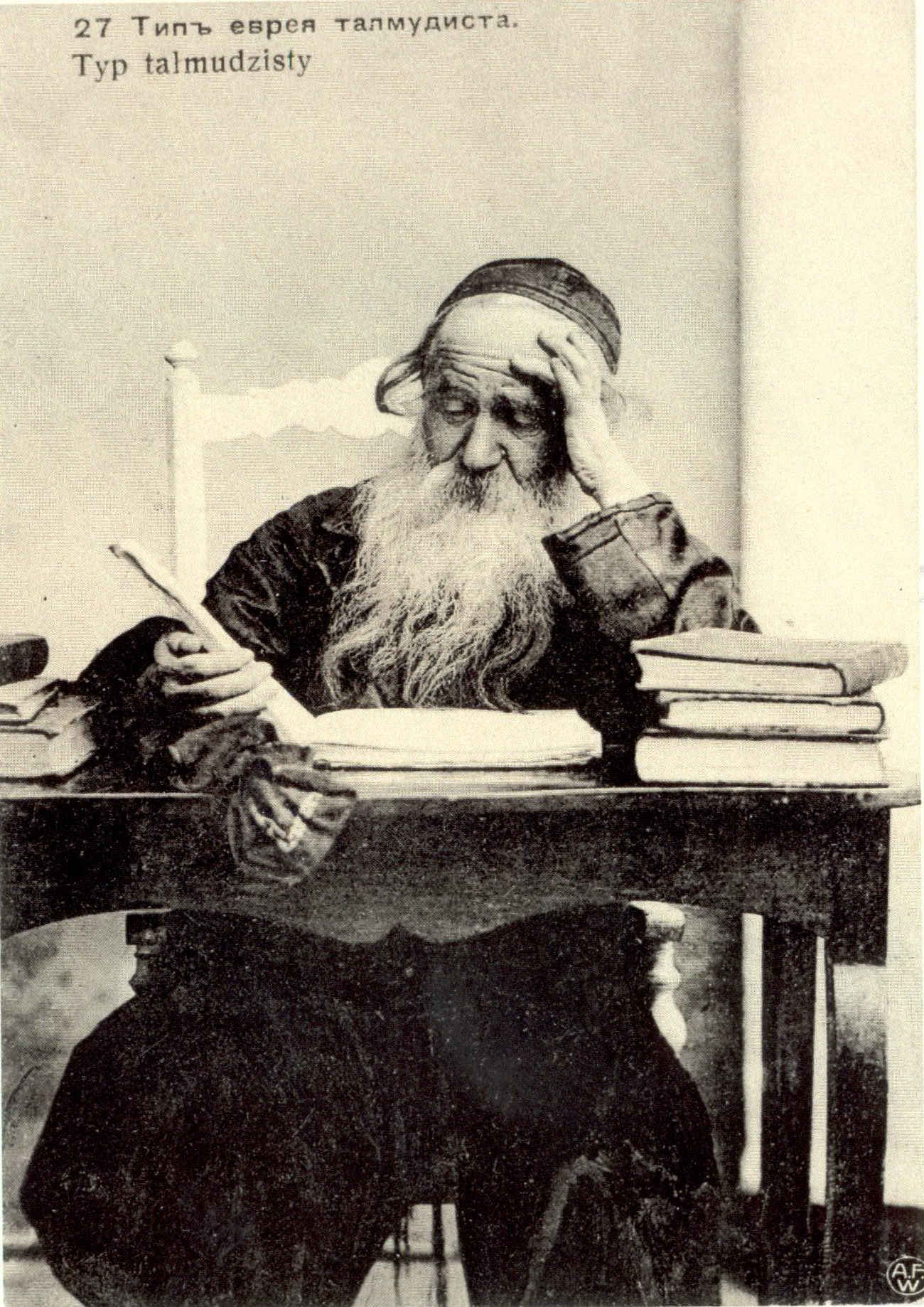
Studying Talmud in Slutsk

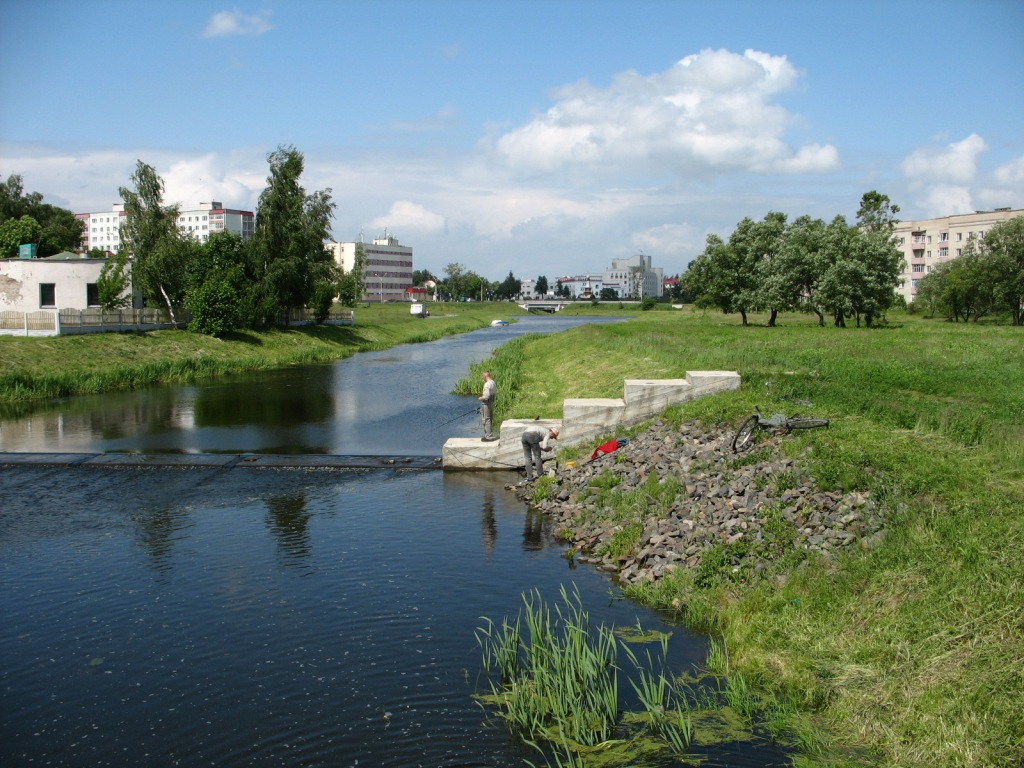
The Slutsk River

== See also ==
- Slutsk Affair
- Slutsk defence action
- Slutsky
- The Holocaust in Byelorussia
- List of cities and towns in Belarus
- Pas kontuszowy
- Słuck Confederation
- Chalice from Slutsk
