= Meyer Waxman =

American rabbi and historian (1887–1969)

Rabbi Dr. Meyer Waxman

Personal life
- Born: 1887 Slutsk, Minsk Governorate, Russian Empire
- Died: March 7, 1969 (aged 81–82) Miami Beach, Florida, United States
- Spouse: Sarah Allen (m. 1913)
- Education: New York University; Columbia University

Religious life
- Religion: Judaism

Jewish leader
- Organisation: Hebrew Theological College
- Semikhah: Jewish Theological Seminary

Meyer Waxman (Yiddish: מאיר וואַכסמאַן; 1887 – March 7, 1969) was an Imperial Russian-born American rabbi, historian, and scholar. He best known for his six-volume work A History of Jewish Literature, published between 1930 and 1960.

== Biography ==
Waxman was born in Slutsk, and received a traditional education at Hasidic yeshivas there and in Mir. He emigrated to the United States in 1905 and studied at New York University, the Jewish Theological Seminary of America, where he was ordained as a rabbi in 1913, and Columbia University, where he received a doctorate in philosophy in 1916. He served for some years in rabbinical posts in Sioux City and in Albany, before returning to New York to become founder and principal of the Mizrachi Teachers Seminary (1917–21). From 1920 to 1924, he served as Executive Director of the Mizrachi Zionist organization.

In 1924 he joined the faculty of the Hebrew Theological College in Chicago, where he served as professor of Hebrew literature and philosophy until his retirement in 1955, also teaching at the College of Jewish Studies in Chicago. After his retirement, he left for Israel to serve as visiting professor at Bar-Ilan University. He then moved to New York where he continued his literary and scholarly activities until his death. He died in March 1969 while vacationing in Miami Beach, Florida.

== Work ==
Waxman is best known for his six-volume magnum opus A History of Jewish Literature (1930–1960). The work contains a history of Jewish literature from the close of the Bible to the 1950s. The purpose of this history was "to make accessible to the large lay intelligent public the results of Jewish scholarship and research in the various branches of Jewish literature, carried on during the last century; to coördinate and correlate the scattered facts and the numerous data, so as to present a complete picture of the productivity of the Jewish genius during the ages." When the final volume was published in 1960, the five earlier volumes — by then long out of print — were reissued in facsimile to create a complete edition.

Waxman also published hundreds of articles in Hebrew, Yiddish, and English. Many of his articles were collected in volumes of essays, Ketavim Nivḥarim (2 vols., 1943–44), Galut u-Ge'ullah (1952), and Moreh ha-Dorot (1963). He wrote studies on the history of Jewish philosophy, including The Philosophy of Don Hasdai Crescas (c. 1920) and a translation, with introduction, of Moses Hess' Rome and Jerusalem (1918, second edition 1943).
