= Vladimir Tsesler =

Belarusian painter (born 1951)

Uladzimir Tsesler
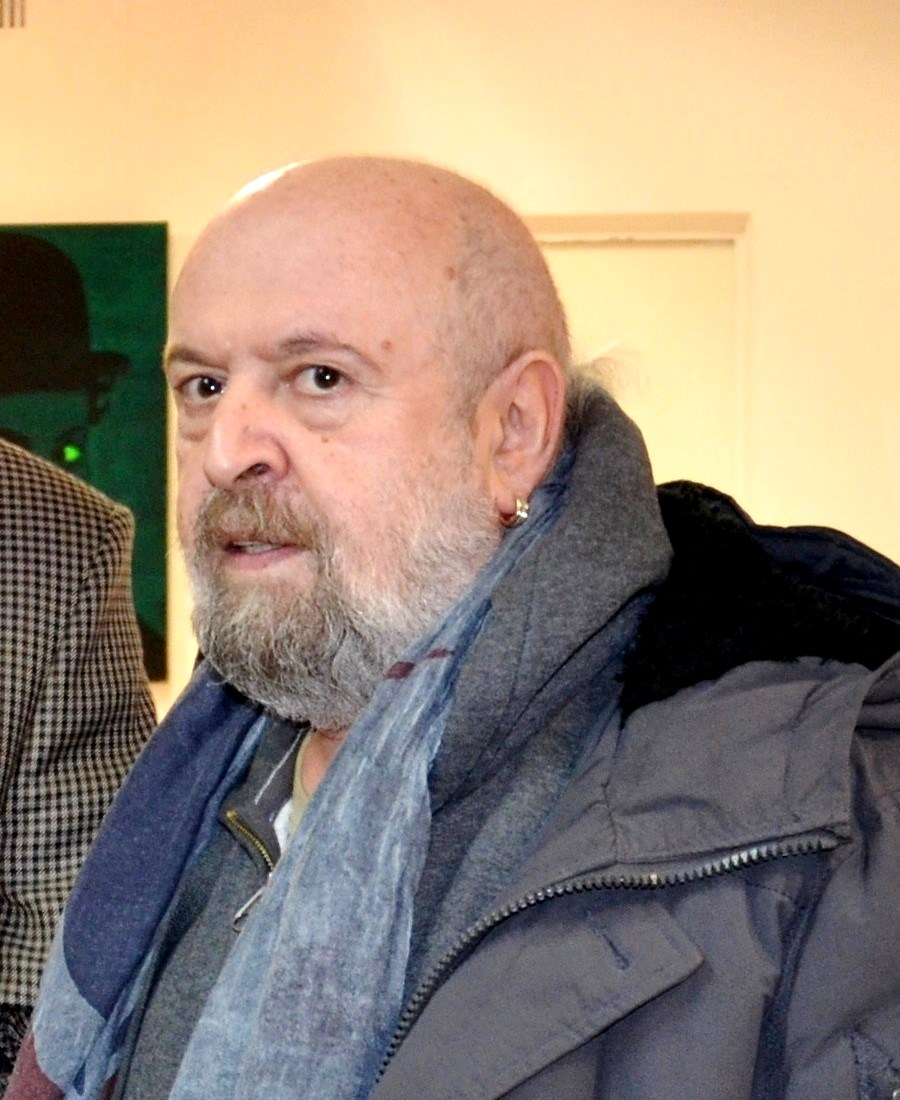
- Born: 30 April 1951; Slutsk, BSSR, USSR
- Known for: Design

Vladimir Yakovlevich Tsesler (Belarusian: Уладзімір Якаўлевіч Цэслер; born April 30, 1951, Slutsk, BSSR, USSR) is a Soviet and Belarusian artist and designer. His work spans poster art, painting, graphics, sculpture, industrial and print design. He is best known for his posters. Tsesler lived and worked in Minsk; since 2020, he has resided in Cyprus.

== Biography ==
Vladimir Tsesler was born in Slutsk in 1951. As a child, he studied at the art studio of the Slutsk House of Pioneers and Schoolchildren under teacher and renowned artist Vladimir Sadin (1924–2010).

His cousin-grandfather Abram Grek lived in the histoorical "Masons' House" in Minsk, where Tsesler often visited. After serving in the army, he moved in and stayed there.

Since 1978, he worked in collaboration with artist Sergey Voychenko, who died in 2004. During their years of partnership, the duo won over 40 international awards. After Voychenko's death, Tsesler has worked independently.

During the 2020 Belarusian protests, he became a member of the Coordination Council for overcoming the political crisis. On August 21, 2020, he was forced to leave Belarus and has since lived in Cyprus.

Tsesler was a member of the Belarusian Union of Designers until 2019 and of the Belarusian Union of Artists until 2023.

== Work ==
Tsesler is considered one of the most prominent contemporary artists and designers in Belarus. His work encompasses poster art, painting, graphics, sculpture, industrial and print design. His collaborative poster work with Sergey Voychenko brought him the greatest recognition.

Their most famous piece is 'Project of the Century. 12 from the 20th', which represents twelve iconic 20th-century artists in the form of eggs. The project was exhibited at the Pushkin Museum in Moscow, the Ludwig Museum at the Russian Museum in St. Petersburg, and the Venice Biennale. The 1986 poster 'From the Year of Peace to a World without Wars', by Voychenko, Andrey Shelyutto, and Tsesler, was awarded the UN Secretary-General's prize. In 1999, their poster 'Two Suns' (an advertisement for the Peugeot 406) won the Grand Prix in the "Print Advertising" category at the "European Line" advertising festival in Minsk. Thirty-seven works by Tsesler and Voychenko are held in the collection of the National Art Museum of Belarus.

Tsesler’s works have been exhibited at the Louvre’s Poster Museum, including the poster 'Woodstock. 30 Years. Levi’s', created with Voychenko. One of his posters received an honorable mention at the 28th International Poster Biennale in Warsaw. Tsesler also designed several album covers for musician Andrey Makarevich and participated in the development of the 'Yo-Mobile' project.

In 2018, a two-part catalog of his work titled Tsesler.com was published.

Art critic Oksana Kovrik wrote that the work of Tsesler and Voychenko reflects “the erasure of familiar genre boundaries, the blurring of lines, and the transformation of political or satirical imagery into a universal commercial product... representing an organic process in forming a new aesthetic in a contemporary post-cultural society.” Gallery owner and cultural figure Marat Gelman highly praised Tsesler’s work. According to Guelman, Tsesler’s humor creates memes. He described Tsesler as “a subtle artist with a sense for form and attention to nuance,” calling him “an artist with a sniper’s eye.”
