= Slutsky =

Slutsky is a Belarusian, Russian, and Ashkenazi Jewish surname that derived from Slutsk in Belarus. The Jewish family name 'Slutsky' is an Ashkenazized form of (Hebrew: סלוצקי; Russian: Слу́цкий; Ukrainian: Слуцький) It is shared by the following people:

- Abram Slutsky (1898–1938), Jewish Ukrainian Soviet head of the foreign intelligence service (GUGB)
- Allan Slutsky, known as "Dr. Licks" (born 1953, Philadelphia, Pennsylvania), a Jewish American arranger
- Boris Slutsky (1919, Slovyansk, Ukraine - 1986), Jewish Ukrainian-Soviet poet
- Erik Slutsky (born 1953), Jewish Canadian contemporary, figurative painter
- Eugen Slutsky (also Yevgeny Evgenievich Slutsky, 1880–1948), Ukrainian-Russian/Soviet mathematical statistician, economist and political economist
  - Slutsky equation
  - Slutsky's theorem
- Irina Slutsky, American internet video personality
- Irina Slutskaya, Russian figure skater
- Leonid Slutsky (football manager) (born 1971), Russian association football manager
- Leonid Slutsky (politician) (born 1968), member of the State Duma of Russia
- Marc Slutsky, drummer for Splender
- Rachel Slutsky, A Social Worker and B'nai Mitzvah tutor at Anshe Sholom Bnai Israel

== Slutzky ==
- Meir Amit, born Meir Slutsky (1921–2009), high-ranking Israeli intelligence officer, politician and cabinet minister
- Naum Slutzky (1894–1965), a Jewish Ukrainian-German/UK goldsmith, Industrial designer and master craftsman of Weimarer Bauhaus
- Richard C. Slutzky, a member of both the Maryland, USA and National Wrestling Halls of Fame
- Robert Slutzky (1929–2005), American painter and architectural theorist
