= Erik Slutsky =

Canadian painter (born 1953)

Erik Slutsky (born 1953) is a contemporary figurative painter who lives in Montreal, Quebec, Canada. His work has been exhibited over the past 30 years in more than 50 international exhibitions in the U.S., Canada, Germany and France.

His paintings often depict male and female figures in an urban landscape and many of them contain political and social commentary. There is a complex symbolism which gives a sense of mystery to much of his work. He works mainly in oils on canvas and also mixed media on paper.

His work is found in many public, private and corporate collections including the Banque Nationale, Dresdner Bank, Musée du Québec, Mercantile Bank, Teleglobe Canada, Sheraton Hotels, The Avmor Collection and many others. He also works as an illustrator, having done many bookcovers, magazine covers and illustrations and posters. One of his works ("Not A Still Life") was on the cover of ISO Focus Magazine (Volume 1. No.8, September 2004) devoted to food and beverage.
