= Slutsk massacre =

Coordinates: 53.0170°N 27.3300°E

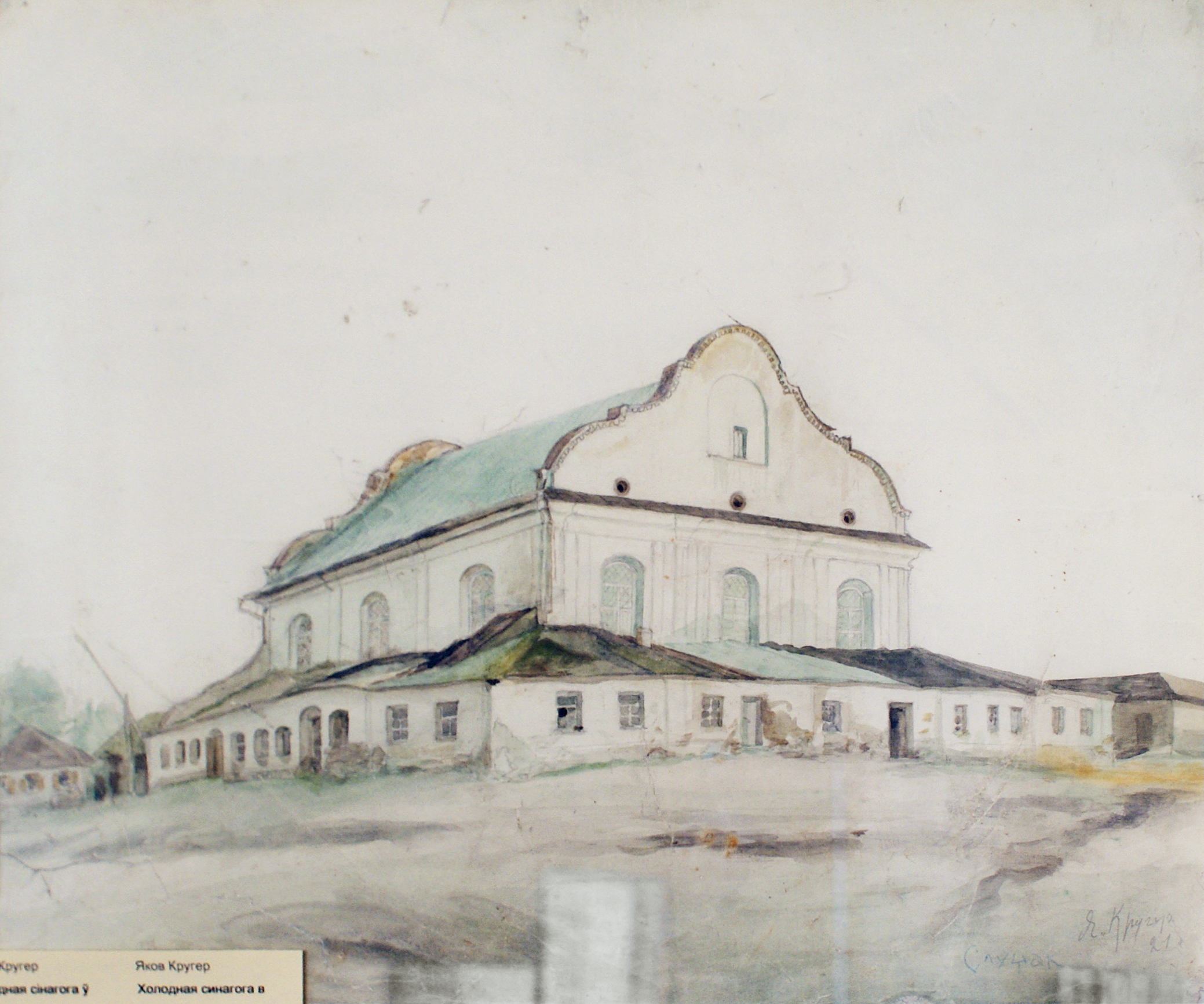
Slutsk Synagogue (Y Krouger.1921)

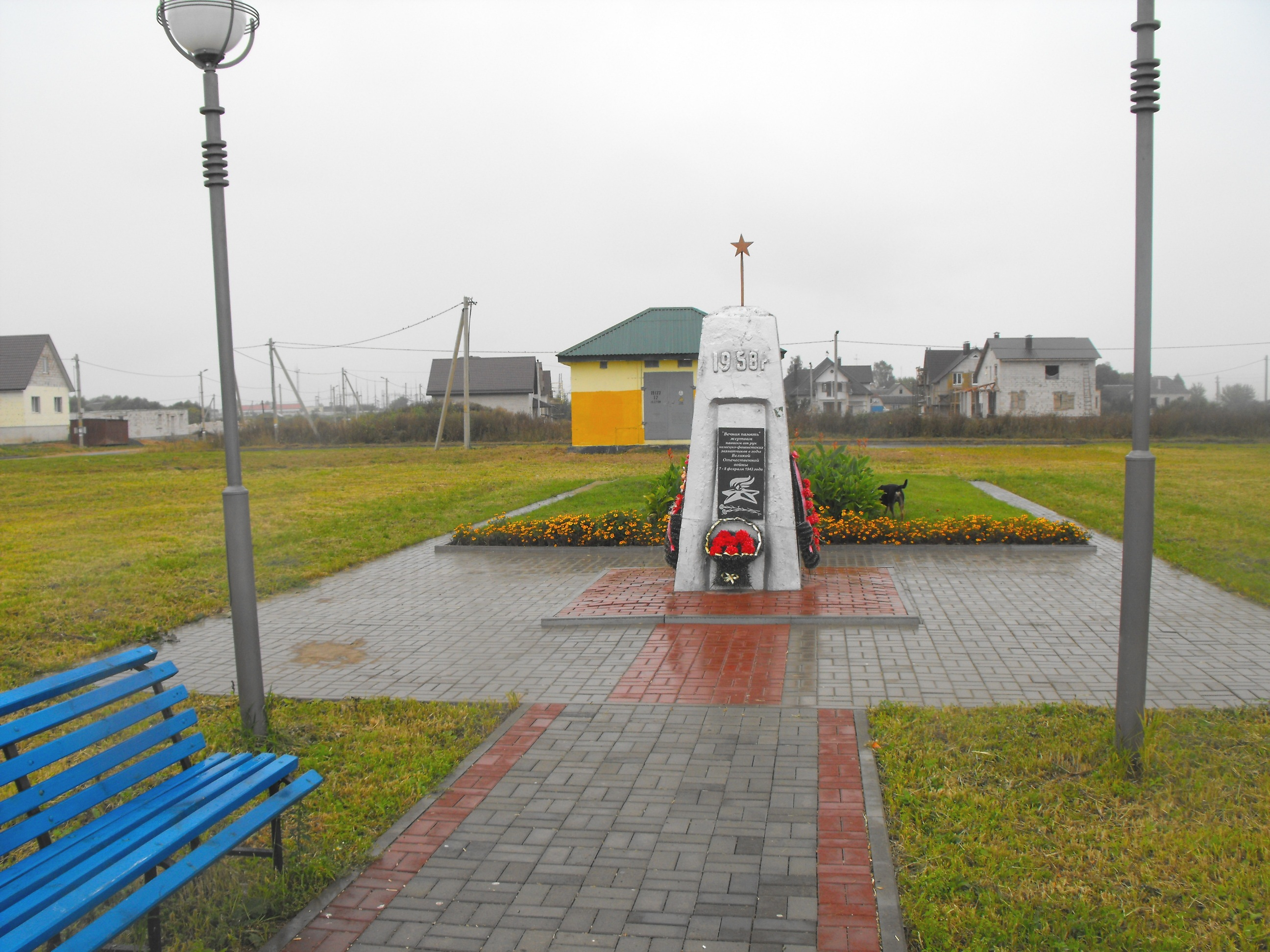
Memorial for the victims of February 1943, Monakhova Street in Slutsk

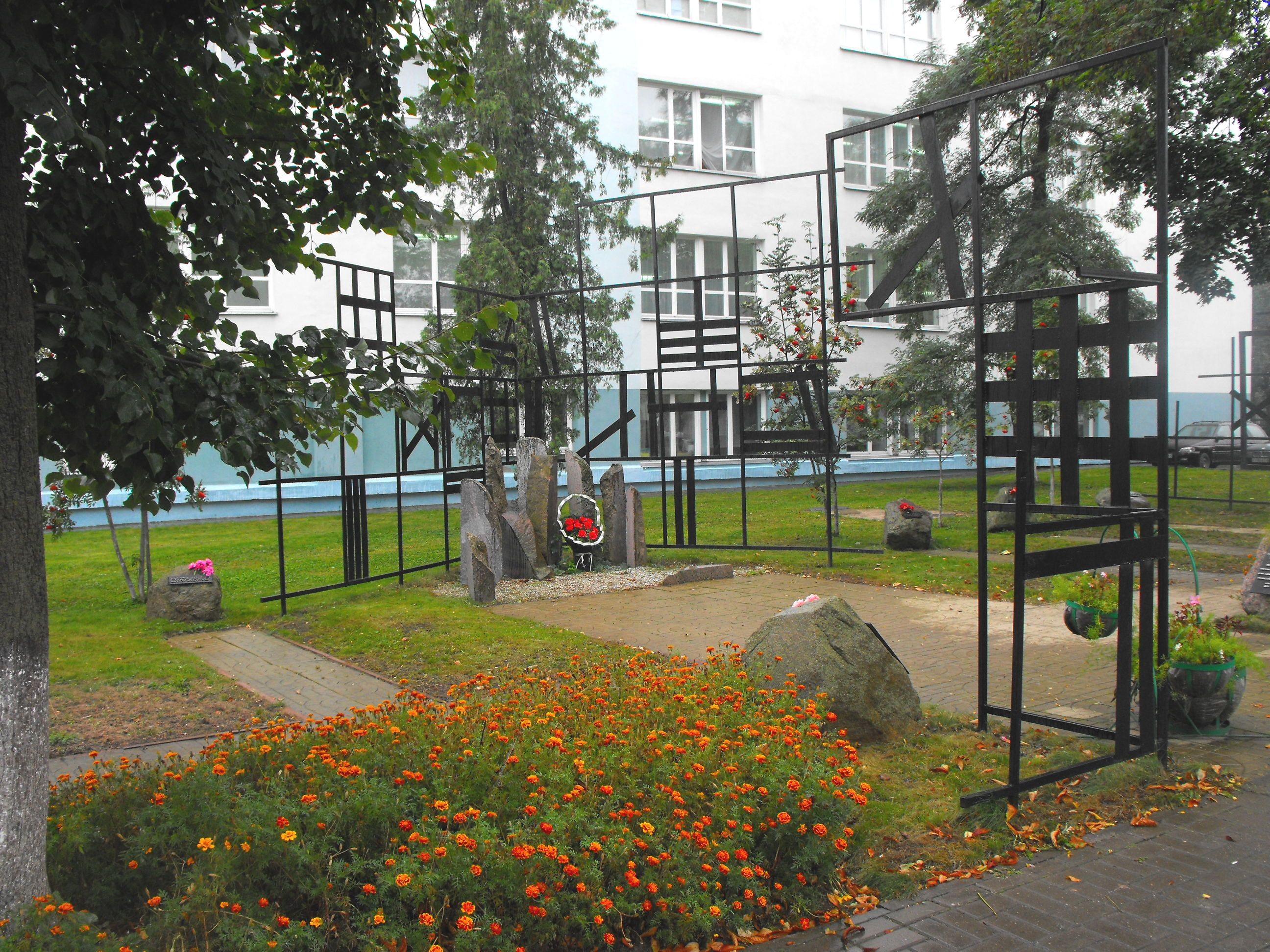
Memorial for the Jews of the Slusk Ghetto, Kolyska Street in Slutsk

The Slutsk affair was a mass killing that occurred near Slutsk, Byelorussian SSR in the Soviet Union from 27 to 28 October 1941. Members of the Gestapo and the Lithuanian Auxiliary Police launched an operation to liquidate the Jewish ghetto in Slutsk without proper authorisation. Around 8,000 to 10,000 people were rounded up and taken to a nearby site where they were killed. Many victims of the operation were non-Jewish Belarusians which caused backlash from the Nazi civil administration in Byelorussia and the Belarusian population.

== Background ==
On 27 June 1941, following the German invasion of the Soviet Union, the city of Slutsk in the Byelorussian SSR was captured by Nazi Germany and incorporated into Generalbezirk Weißruthenien (White Ruthenia). Slutsk had a large concentration of both Jews and Belarusians, and the Nazi authorities soon established a Jewish ghetto within the city. By September, most Jews in Slutsk and the surrounding area were confined to the city ghetto and required to wear the yellow star. Those deemed unfit to perform forced labour in factories and workshops, mainly the elderly, were taken out in small groups to Gorevakha on the western outskirts of Slutsk and shot.

== Massacre ==
On 27 October 1941, four companies of Lithuanian Auxiliary Police stationed in Kaunas entered Slutsk with the assignment of liquidating the city's Jewish population within two days. This "special security operation" was led by the Einsatzgruppen (mobile death squads) of the Gestapo, and acted without authorization from the local German civil administration and SS authorities that had marshaled various specialized workers from the population. The Jews in Slutsk were surrounded, removed from their houses, rounded up and marched to Gorevakha to be killed en masse. The operation was such a frenzy that many Belarusians outside of the ghetto were also rounded up accidentally.

== Aftermath ==
An estimated 8,000 to 10,000 people were marched from Slutsk to Gorevakha where they were subsequently shot, with around only half to two-thirds of the victims being Jews. The high proportion of Belarusian victims is believed to have contributed to an uptick of youths joining the Belarusian resistance movement. The German civil administration was outraged, after having made great efforts to gain the favor of the local Belarusian population in accordance with the instructions of Adolf Hitler.

Commissioner General of White Ruthenia Wilhelm Kube wrote in protest to his superior and to Reichsführer-SS Heinrich Himmler:

The town was a picture of horror during the action. With indescribable brutality on the part of both the German police officers and particularly the Lithuanian partisans, the Jewish people, but also among them Belarusians, were taken out of their dwellings and herded together. Everywhere in the town shots were to be heard and in different streets the corpses of shot Jews accumulated. The Belarusians were in greatest distress to free themselves from the encirclement.

The letter concluded:

I am submitting this report in duplicate so that one copy may be forwarded to the Reich Minister. Peace and order cannot be maintained in White Ruthenia with methods of that sort. To bury seriously wounded people alive who worked their way out of their graves again is such a base and filthy act that the incidents as such should be reported to the Führer and Reichsmarshal.

Hitler, by all accounts, was never notified of the incident and thereafter mistakenly believed that Nazi partisans among the Belarusian population would support the Germans in the continuing invasion.

== See also ==
- Holocaust
- The Holocaust in Byelorussia
- List of massacres in Belarus
