= Dmitry Strukov =

Russian painter, art restorer and archaeologist (1828-1899)

- Дмитрий Струков
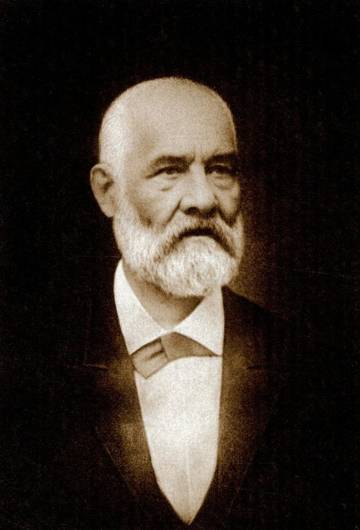
- Born: Dmitry Mikhailovich Strukov; 1828; Moscow, Russian Empire
- Died: 1899 (aged 70–71); Moscow, Russian Empire
- Education: Stroganov School for Technical Drawing
- Occupations: Painter; art restorer; archaeologist

Dmitry Mikhailovich Strukov (Russian: Дмитрий Михайлович Струков; 1828, Moscow - 1899, Moscow) was a Russian painter, art restorer and archaeologist.

== Biography ==
His father was a tailor. In the 1830s, during the cholera pandemic, the family moved about; first to Nizhny Novgorod, then Verkhoturye and, finally, Nizhny Tagil. When they returned to Moscow in 1840, he was enrolled at the Stroganov School for Technical Drawing.

Four years later, he produced his first professional works; an iconostasis and a portrait for the mayor of Lyubertsy. In 1849, he helped establish the icon painting school at the Trinity Lavra of St. Sergius. That same year, he compiled a guide to Moscow's Orthodox shrines. The following year, the Rector of Sarov Monastery commissioned him to draw the monuments there and at the Diveyevo Monastery.

After that, he travelled almost constantly, sketching historical sites in Nizhny Novgorod, Vladimir, Murom, the Caucasus and Crimea. In 1853, he was named an "Artist" for watercolors by the Imperial Academy of Arts. His copy of an ancient icon at Grebnevskoy Church was presented to Tsar Nicholas I, who awarded him a diamond ring and free access to antiquities in every monastery and church.

In 1858, he began publishing a magazine, Школа рисования (Drawing School), containing lessons on drawing historiated initials and miniature vignettes, as well as essays on Russian art in general. He was forced to discontinue publication in 1863, and was left in debt for 25 years.

In 1859, he was invited to the Kremlin Armoury to copy the monuments and decorations and assist in their restoration. Later, he became the artist-in-residence there. In 1860, he helped catalog the collection of Christian antiquities belonging to the archaeologist Pyotr Sevastyanov, to prepare them for donation to the Rumyantsev Museum. To help defray his debts, he also served as a teacher at several Moscow schools. This experience allowed him to develop a special method to teach drawing quickly; which he demonstrated by teaching 200 soldiers from the Pernovsky Regiment.

In 1864, the Governor-General of Vilnius, Mikhail Muravyov-Vilensky, invited him to tour the Northwestern Krai to research ancient monuments that were damaged or nearly destroyed by the recent January Uprising. Many of these monuments are now known only through the medium of Strukov's watercolors. Five years later, he encouraged the "Moscow Society of Lovers of Spiritual Enlightenment" to initiate a program that would identify icons in need of restoration. Over 300 were eventually saved. In 1873, he opened an icon painting school in a house donated by a prominent merchant and gave the works that were produced to poor rural churches.

His later notable restoration projects included ones at Saint Basil's Cathedral and the Ivan the Great Bell Tower. He also made numerous trips to Crimea and the Caucasus on behalf of the Imperial Russian Archaeological Society. In 1888, he discovered the "Zelenchuk Inscription" (named after the nearby Bolshoy Zelenchuk River); a tenth-century inscription on a tombstone made in an alphabet based on the Greek script that is the earliest known example of the Ossetian language.

During his later years, he operated a workshop that produced icons and church plate in the old styles. He was a recipient of the Order of St. Anna, the Order of St. Stanislaus and the Order of St. Vladimir.

== Gallery ==
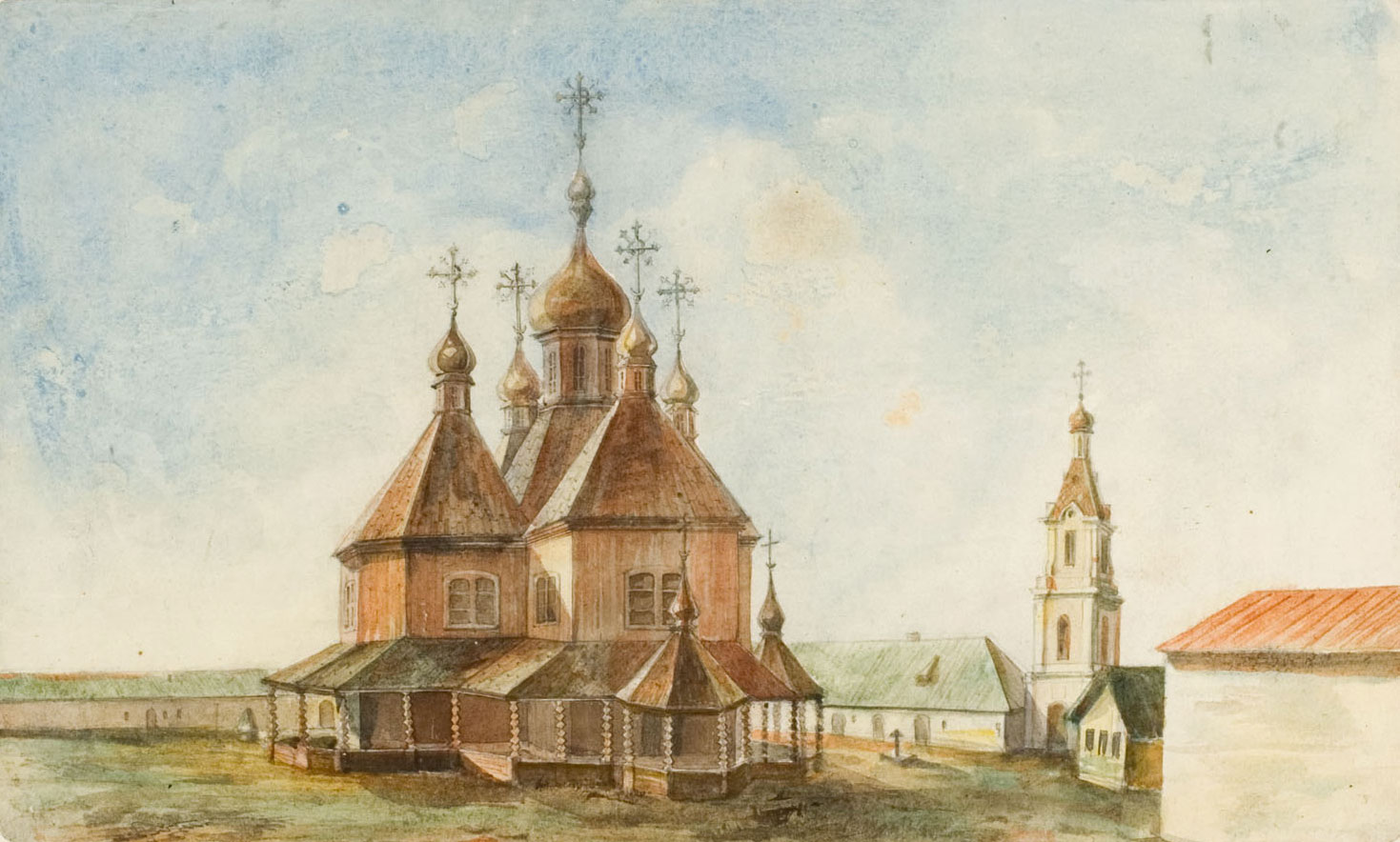
Monastery of the Holy Trinity, Vitebsk

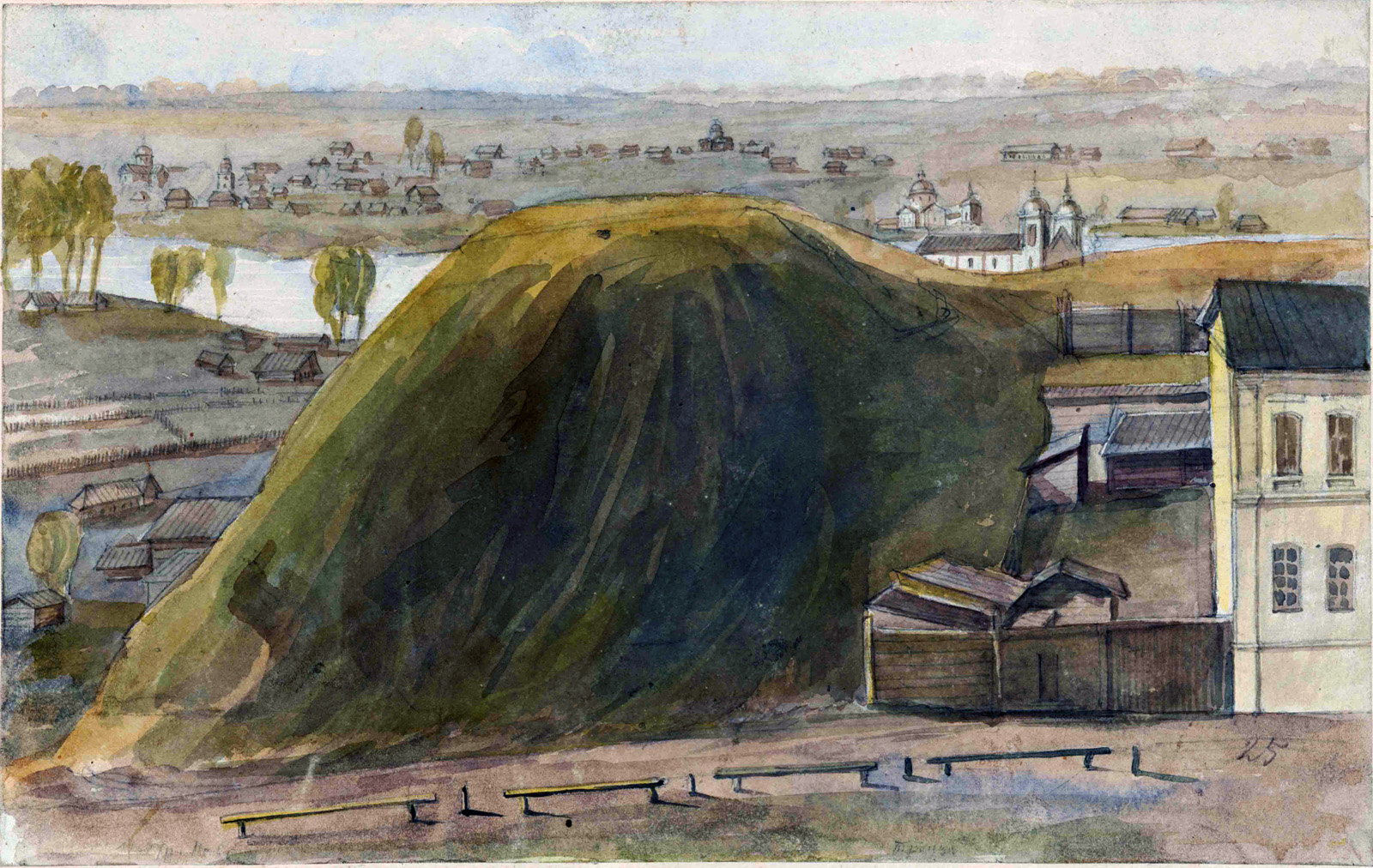
Old Town, Mogilev

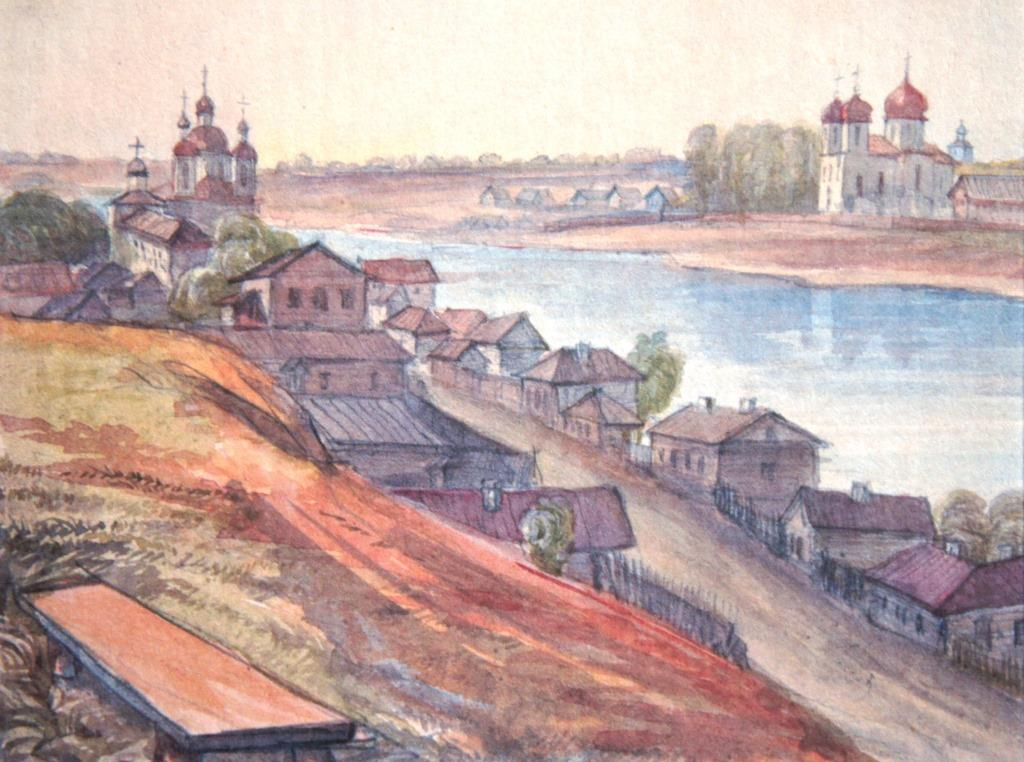
Main Street, Polotsk
