= Cinema of Belarus =

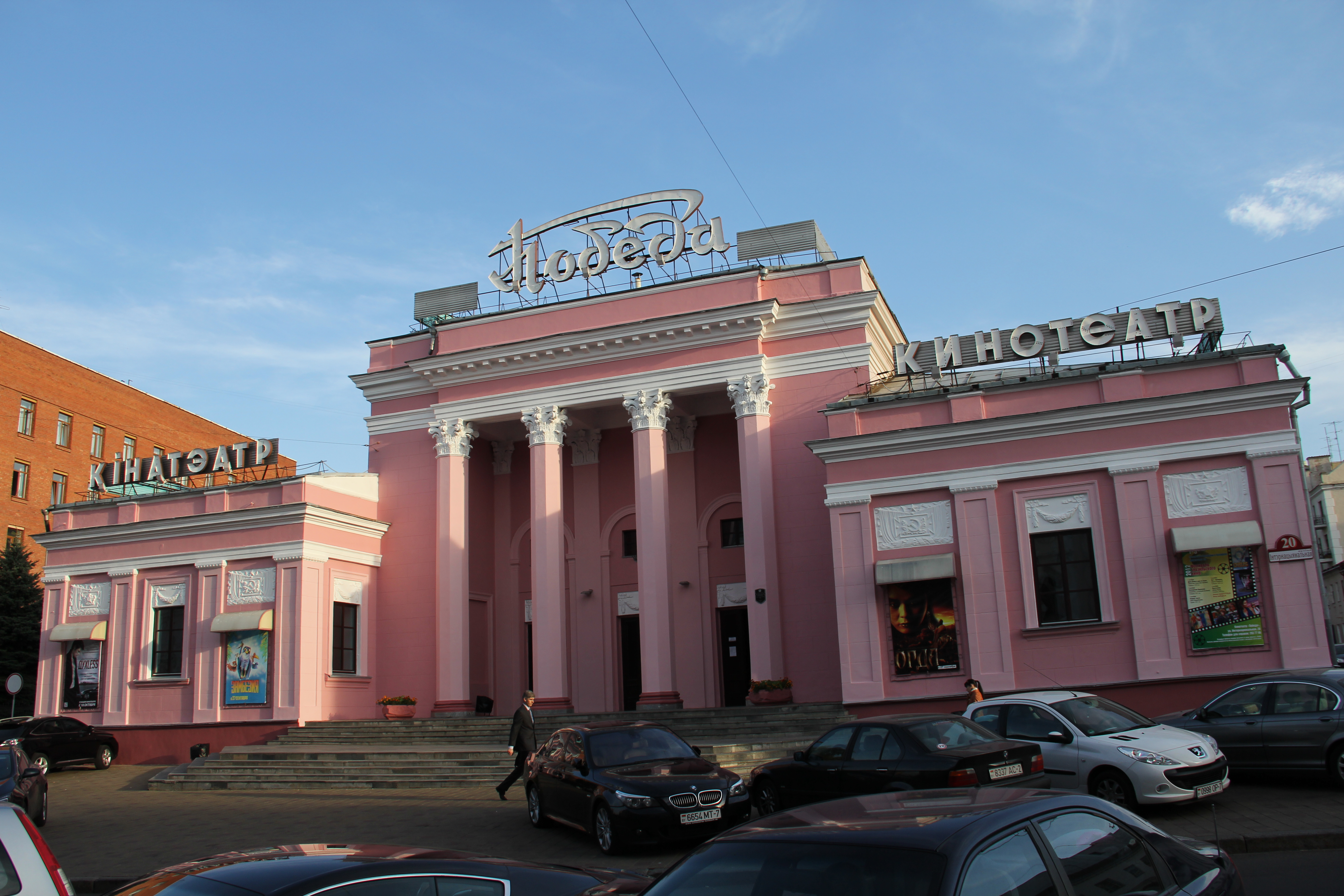
Pobeda cinema in Minsk

The Cinema of Belarus began on 17 December 1924 with the creation by decree of what later became Belarusfilm studio. The studio was moved to Minsk in 1939. Film production was interrupted by World War II, and restarted in 1946, when the studio assumed its current name.

Most of the output has been in Russian rather than Belarusian.

Belarusfilm is also a co-organizer of the Listapad film festival held in Minsk, Belarus in November.

== Film studios ==
- Cubastudio
- Belarusfilm
- Belsat
- Beltelefilm
- Navigator studio
- Partyzanfilm

== Festivals ==
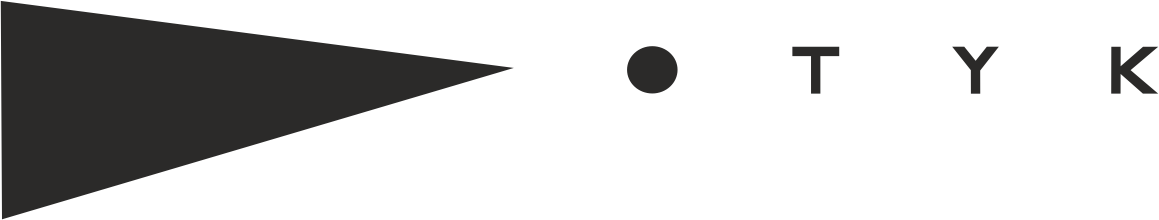
DOTYK Queer Film Festival logo

- DOTYK
- Listapad

== Notable films ==
- 1975 The Adventures of Buratino
- 1977 About Red Riding Hood
- 1985 Come and See
- 1993 Me Ivan, You Abraham
- 1996 From Hell to Hell
- 2001 In August of 44
- 2003 Anastasia Slutskaya
- 2003 Babiy Yar
- 2003 Kola (short film)
- 2004 On the Nameless Height
- 2004 Dunechka
- 2004 Mysterium Occupation
- 2006 A Lesson of Belarusian (documentary film)
- 2006 Franz + Polina
- 2010 Fortress of War
- 2010 Massacre
- 2012 Above the Sky
- 2012 Viva Belarus!
- 2012 In the Fog
- 2014 The Interrogation of Muscular P.O.W.
- 2015 GaraSh
- 2016 PARTY-ZAN film
- 2018 Crystal Swan

== Actors ==
- Dzmitry Papko
- Vladimir Gostyukhin
- Viktar Shalkevich
- Petr Shelokhonov
- Rostislav Yankovsky
- Sviatlana Zeliankouskaya
- Irina Medvedeva

== Directors ==
- Serguei Kouchnerov
- Vladimir Kozlov
- Vladimir Motyl
- Solomon Shulman
- Yelena Trofimenko
- Yuriy Khashchevatskiy
