= Trofimenko =

Trofimenko or Trofymenko (Трофименко) is a Ukrainian surname. Notable people with the surname include:

- Mykola Trofymenko (born 1985), Ukrainian political scientist
- Sergei Trofimenko (1899–1953), Soviet general
- Swiatoslaw Trofimenko, American chemist
- Vitali Trofimenko (born 1970), Russian footballer
- Vladimir Trofimenko (1953–1994), Russian pole vaulter
- Yelena Trofimenko (born 1964), Belarusian film director
