= Illia Ponomarenko =

Ukrainian journalist (born 1992)

- Ілля Пономаренко
- Born: Illia Oleksandrovych Ponomarenko; 25 February 1992 (age 34); Volnovakha, Donetsk Oblast, Ukraine
- Education: Mariupol State University
- Occupation: Journalist
- Years active: 2014–present
- Website: https://kyivindependent.com/author/illia-ponomarenko

Illia Oleksandrovych Ponomarenko (Ukrainian: Ілля Олександрович Пономаренко; born 25 February 1992) is a Ukrainian journalist, war reporter and defense analyst who worked for The Kyiv Independent from 2021 to 2023, covering the Russo-Ukrainian war. In January 2023, given his prominent role in reporting from the conflict, he was described by Der Spiegel as "likely the best-known Ukrainian after President Volodymyr Zelenskyy".

== Early life ==
Ponomarenko was born in 1992. He grew up in Volnovakha, and studied at Mariupol State University. He has stated he was studying international relations in Mariupol when the city was occupied in 2014 by Russian-backed forces.

== Career ==
Ponomarenko began reporting on the clashes of the war in Donbas for BBC Radio. He previously wrote for the Kyiv Post, but following the abrupt reformatting and temporary closure of the Kyiv Post in November 2021, Ponomarenko was among the team of journalists who founded The Kyiv Independent.

Shortly after the 2022 Russian invasion of Ukraine, Ponomarenko saw his Twitter following soar to over one million, as many sought on-the-ground information in the early days of the invasion; Der Spiegel wrote that "for people worldwide, he became the most important chronicler of the war during this period". Since then, he has been regularly cited in international media, as well as writing translated opinion pieces, such as for Norwegian Aftenposten.

On 18 November 2024, Bloomsbury Publishing published his book on the Battle of Kyiv, I Will Show You How It Was: The Story of Wartime Kyiv.
