= Vladimir Kozlov (disambiguation) =

Vladimir Kozlov (born 1979) is a Ukrainian-American professional wrestler. Other notable people named Vladimir Kozlov include:

- Vladimir Kozlov (bobsleigh) (born 1958), Soviet bobsledder
- Vladimir Kozlov (footballer) (born 1946), Soviet footballer
- Vladimir Kozlov (director) (born 1956), Belarusian film director and screenwriter
- Vladimir Kozlov (politician) (born 1960), Kazakh politician
- Vladimir Kozlov (speed skater) (born 1959), Soviet Olympic speed skater
