= Mysterium Occupation =

- Directed by: Andrei Kudinenko
- Written by: Aleksander Katchan
- Produced by: Andrei Kudinenko; Aleksander Debalyuk; Sergey Artimovitch
- Starring: Aleksander Debalyuk; Anatoly Kot; Aleksander Molchanov; Svetlana Zelenkovskaya; Lyubov Rumyantseva; Igor Denisov; Elena Sidorova; Andrei Kureichik; Anna Pinkevich
- Music by: Andrei Volkov
- Distributed by: Studio NAVIGATOR
- Release date: 2004 (Belarus)
- Running time: 90 minutes
- Language: Belarusian

Mysterium Occupation (Belarusian: Акупацыя. Містэрыі) is a 2004 Belarusian military drama film.
