= Viva Belarus! =

- Directed by: Krzysztof Łukaszewicz
- Written by: Franak Viačorka, Krzysztof Łukaszewicz
- Starring: Dzmitry Papko; Vadim Affanasiev; Karolina Gruszka; Anatoliy Kot; Pavel Kryksunou; Aliaksandr Malchanau; Dzianis Tarasenka
- Cinematography: Witold Stok
- Music by: Lavon Volski
- Production company: WFDiF
- Release dates: May 12, 2012 (Belarus); April 19, 2013 (Poland)
- Running time: 98 minutes
- Country: Poland
- Languages: Belarusian; Russian

Viva Belarus! (Belarusian: Жыве Беларусь!, romanized: Žyvie Biełaruś!, Polish: Żywie Biełaruś!) is a 2012 Polish drama film directed by Krzysztof Łukaszewicz about Belarusian Youth and its struggle for democracy. Based on a true story of Franak Viačorka, activist of the Belarusian opposition, co-author of the screenplay for the film.

In April 2026, a Belarusian court added the film to the list of extremist materials.

== Plot ==
Belarus has been under the dictatorship of Alexander Lukashenko for 16 years. Miron (23) is not interested in politics, he thinks his friends from the democratic opposition make just a bunch of daydreamers. However, the "independent" rock group's next rock concert triggers public anti-regime demonstrations. Miron pays for these events by being forcibly drafted into the army despite his heart disease. In his unit, Miron comes face-to-face with inhumane conditions and indoctrination in the Soviet spirit. In protest, Miron, with the support of his beautiful and tireless girlfriend Vera, publishes blog ‘Life of a Conscript' on the Internet. The blog portrays the army as a miniature of contemporary Belarus, and its citizens as 'conscripts', subject to informal hierarchies and indoctrination, sparking a real storm in the Internet. Miron uses extracts from the blog in satirical songs which slam the regime and become street hits. The authorities decide to hit the rebel in his most sensitive spot... The film touches on the issues of human rights in Belarus and the protests in December 2010.

== Festivals and awards ==
- 11th Brussels Film Festival – Belgium – 19/26 June 2013 Prize Best Screenplay.
- 38° Gdynia Film Festival – Poland – 9/14 September 2013 Audience Award For The Best Film.
- 3° Crime and Punishment Film Festival – Istanbul – Turkey – 9/16 sept 2013 First Prize
- 4. Military Film Festival – Warsaw – 16/21. September 2013 Best Feature Film, Golden Sable
- 7. International Film festival for Young People – Austria – 3/5. October 2013 Prize of the Jury and Audience Award
- Febiofest – PRAGUE int. FF – Czech Republic - 14/22 March 2013 Official Selection
- Belarusian Days STOCKHOLM – Sweden – 19/21 March 2013
- Presentation at the European Parliament – October 15, 2013
- Molodist KIEV – 19/27 October 2013
- Scanorama – Lithuania -7/24 November 2013 Official Selection
- Camerimage - Poland -16/23 November 2013 Official Selection
- Goa Int Film festival – India -20/30 November 2013 Official Selection
- Tofifest - Poland - November 2013, Official Selection
- Polish festival Chicago- US - 8/26 November 2013 Official Selection
- Polish festival in Toronto – Canada – November 2013 Official Selection
- Noordelijk Festival – the Netherlands – 6/10 November 2013 Official Selection
- Camerimage Intl Film Festival of the Art of Cinematography – Poland - Nov 16-23 Official Selection
