= Vitali Trofimenko =

Russian footballer and referee

Personal information
- Full name: Vitali Stanislavovich Trofimenko
- Date of birth: 25 December 1970 (age 55)
- Height: 1.83 m (6 ft 0 in)
- Positions: Defender; midfielder

Senior career*
Years	Team	Apps	(Gls)
1988	FC Uralets Nizhny Tagil	11	(0)
1989–1990	MTsOP-Metallurg Verkhnyaya Pyshma	65	(7)
1991	FC Kuban Krasnodar	38	(0)
1992–1993	FC Lada Togliatti	55	(1)
1994	FC Rostselmash Rostov-on-Don	12	(0)
1994–1997	FC Lada Togliatti	74	(1)
1995	→ FC Lada-d Togliatti (loan)	2	(0)
- * Club domestic league appearances and goals

Vitali Trofimenko
- Full name: Vitali Stanislavovich Trofimenko
- Born: 25 December 1970 (age 55)

Domestic
Years	League	Role
2000–2003	Russian Second Division	Referee
2002–2004	Russian First Division	Referee

Vitali Stanislavovich Trofimenko (Russian: Виталий Станиславович Трофименко; born 25 December 1970) is a former Russian football player and referee.
