= Mariupol State University =

Ukrainian academic institution

Coordinates: 47.1019°N 37.5256°E

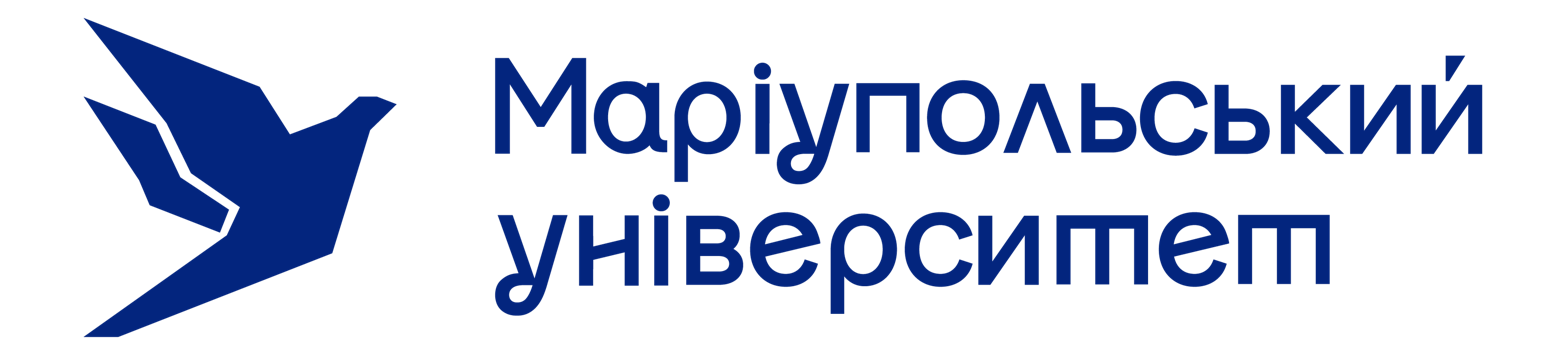
- Motto: With Mariupol in our heart on the way to a new start!
- Motto in English: With Mariupol in our heart on the way to a new start!
- Established: 1991
- Affiliations: Ministry of Education and Science of Ukraine
- Chancellor: Mykola Trofymenko
- Students: 4200
- Location: (de jure) 129A Budivelnykiv Ave., 87500, Mariupol, Donetsk Oblast, Ukraine
- Website: https://mu.edu.ua
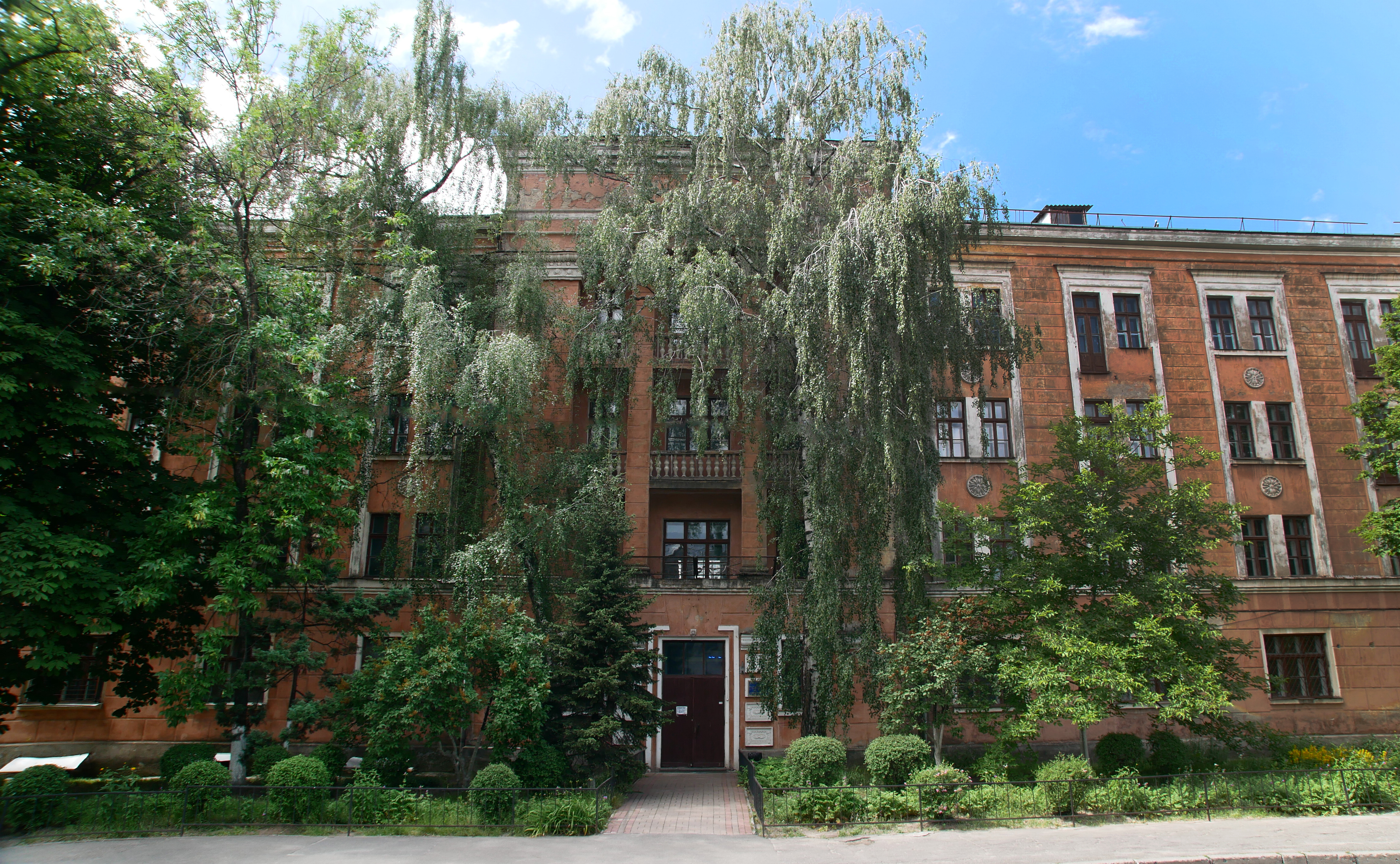

The Mariupol State University (abbr. MSU; Ukrainian: Маріупольський Державний Університет, romanized: Mariupolskyi Derzhavnyi Universytet) is a university in the Ukrainian city of Mariupol.

== History ==
In September 1991, at the initiative of the Hellenic Association of Mariupol and Donetsk State University and with assistance provided by the City Hall of Mariupol, the Mariupol College of Humanities was founded as an affiliation of Donetsk State University.

In 1997, the Mariupol Institute of Humanities was recognized in Ukraine and in Greece as the leading center of academic instructions in the Greek language, revival of the Ukrainian Hellenes as well as the center of friendship and cooperation between the two countries. The university was visited by Konstantinos Stefanopoulos, President of Hellenic Republic, who was elected Honorary Professor of MIH.

Formed in 2002, the Greek Philology Faculty is the first and only one of its kind in Ukraine. Professor Kostyantyn Balabanov, Rector of Mariupol State University of Humanities, signed a Magna Charta Universitatum at Bologna University allowing MSUH to join a more than 500-member family of the best European Universities.

On June 18–19, 2005 for the first time in Ukraine, two universities – Donetsk National University and Mariupol State University of Humanities – hosted the sessions of Magna Charta Observatory. Leading scientists, as well as rectors of universities of Ukraine and elsewhere in Europe, took part in that session.

In 2006, the Library of Hellenistic Studies 'Konstantinos Leventis' appeared and became famous both in Ukraine and abroad as the most modern and highly completed library on Hellenism. Anastasios I. Leventis, Director of Anastasios G. Leventis Foundation takes part in the opening ceremony of the Library of Hellenistic Studies at MSUH.

The university becomes the seat of the European Public Law Center in Ukraine. It also becomes the library reference center on public law.

MSUH was elected member of the Presidium of the International Association of Juridical Universities, whose headquarters are located on the Law Faculty of Moscow State Lomonosov University. Under the active guidance of Rector Balabanov, Ukraine was elected member of the European Public Law Organization. The university became the premises of the Center of Information for the European Commission in Ukraine. By the edict issued by Thasos Papadopoulos, President of Republic of Cyprus and with the assistance provided by the Ministry of Foreign Affairs of Ukraine, Consulate Honorary of Republic of Cyprus was set up at MSUH's premises. Kostyantyn Balabanov, Rector of MSUH, was nominated Consul Honorary of Republic of Cyprus in Mariupol

In 2008, the State Accreditation Committee headed by Professor Ivan Vakarchuk, Minister of Science and Education of Ukraine, decided to confer on Mariupol State University of Humanities its highest award – the fourth level of accreditation. Karolos Papoulias, President of Hellenic Republic, was awarded the Diploma of MSUH Honorary Professor and attended the opening ceremony of Ukraine-Greece Friendship and Hellenistic Research Institute. MSUH was visited by Pietro Giovanni Donnici, Consul Extraordinary and Plenipotentiary of Italian Republic to Ukraine and by Professor Nikola Franco Balloni, Director of the Italian Institute of Culture in Ukraine. The opening ceremony of the Italian Cultural Center.

Mariupol State University of Humanities received a delegation from Qiqihar University (People's Republic of China) headed by Rector Ma Liquin in 2009 and the Chinese cultural center was created.

In 2010, Mariupol State University of Humanities and the Kyiv Vadim Get'man National University of Economics and National Prykarpats'kyy Vasyl' Stefanyk University became the winners of the joint EU – UNO project "Program of joint opportunities and women's rights in Ukraine". The event resulted in the memorandum of cooperation between the EU – UNO Program and MSUH and in appearance of the Gender Studies Center. The opening ceremony of the Israeli Cultural Center was held on Foreign Languages Faculty. The university was visited by the Councilor of the Embassy of the State Israel in Ukraine and the Regional Director of the "Nativ" organization Felix Mindel. The Center of Polish Culture was also created. The center is supposed to help students learn the Polish language and literature and to adjust student exchange with the Polish universities. The solemn opening ceremony was attended by Consul General of Republic of Poland in Khar'kov Grzegorz Sorochinskiy and First Vice Rector of Polonian Academy in Czestochowa Maria Urbaniec. MSUH acquired the status of a classical university and was renamed as Mariupol State University (MSU).

In 2011, MSU held an unprecedented research conference in its history: "Science and education in the modern university in the context of international cooperation", dedicated to the 20th anniversary of the Ukrainian Independence. The scientific forum gathered more than 300 participants from 15 countries of the world. The conference was attended by well-known scientists and diplomats as well as by state officials and public leaders from Great Britain, Greece, Italy, Cyprus, China, the US, France, and other countries. The participants and the guests of the conference were greeted by the presidents of three countries: President of Ukraine, President of Hellenic Republic and President of Republic of Cyprus. In the framework of the conference, seven agreements on cooperation were signed with most authoritative universities of Great Britain, Greece, Italy, China and Russia. On July 5, a guest arrived in Mariupol in response to the invitation made by Professor Kostyantyn Balabanov, Rector of MSU. That was Dimitris Christofias, President of Republic of Cyprus. At the solemn session of the Scientific Board, the instructors and the students of Mariupol State University, Mr. President was awarded the title of MSU Honorary Professor and a medal in acknowledgement of his contribution to the university's development. That visit promoted the strengthening of cooperation and the expansion of educational, scientific and cultural cooperation between the university and Republic of Cyprus. On March 28, Mariupol State University held a solemn ceremony on the occasion of being awarded the Letter of Acknowledgement of the Cabinet of Ministers "in recognition of the tangible contribution into development of national education, strengthening of the international authority of Ukraine and training of highly qualified specialists" signed by Mykola Azarov, Prime Minister of Ukraine (Resolution of the Cabinet of Minister of Ukraine No. 22525 dated of December 28, 2011).

In 2022, all academic buildings of Mariupol State University were significantly damaged or destroyed by Russian invasion army during the Russo-Ukrainian War.

Mariupol State University and Vuhledar Professional College, a structural part of the university, are continuing to operate in Kyiv throughout the war. The Kyiv National University of Construction and Architecture No. 4 is serving as the temporary home of Mariupol University. A building will be constructed to meet the educational demands of MSU. It is planned to complete the works in 2024. At the moment, part of the working and educational spaces have already been updated, in particular, a cyber security laboratory, the hall of the Academic Council of MSU, an Art space, etc. have been created. Additionally, Mariupol State University staff, professors, and students will be able to dwell in a dormitory. Also in 2022, restructuring was carried out, as a result of which the Faculty of Greek Philology and Translation was reorganized. In 2023, active repair work is underway in buildings provided by the university in the city of Kyiv. As of the beginning of August 2023, part of the work and study spaces have been updated, in particular, a cyber security laboratory, a hall of the MSU Academic Council, an Art space, a co-working space, and an admissions committee have been created.

== Campuses and buildings ==
General description of the buildings and premises of the university, as well as their purpose. Mariupol State University has five academic buildings.

Academic building No. 1 (Economics and Law Department). Location: Budivelnykiv Ave., 129A, Mariupol. 3-storey building with lecture halls, classrooms, dean's offices, chairs, premises of administrative services and offices, sports room, computer rooms, laboratories, a buffet. Other facilities: one computer room, one computer lab, one reading room, equipped with computers: 35 computer work places.

Academic building No. 2 (History Department). Location: Budivelnykiv Ave., 129, Mariupol. 3-storey building with lecture halls, classrooms, chairs, dean's offices, library with reading room, computer labs, dance class, first-aid post, a buffet. Academic building has the following facilities: two computer rooms, a reading room equipped with computers: a total number of computer works places – 33. Also, first-aid post and a library with a reading room and a lending library.

Educational building No. 3-4 (Philology Department). Location: st. Matrosov, 5, 129A, Mariupol. The Building number 3 (2-storey building with lecture halls, classrooms, chairs, library with reading room, first-aid post, laboratories, cloakroom) is united with the building number 4 (3-storey building with lecture halls, classrooms, chairs, deans' offices, a computer lab, a buffet) by a crossing on the second floor. There is a sports area and sports facilities. Sports facilities: a circular running track, sports ground, playground. Education and Training Facilities: TV, DVD players. Other facilities: 1 computer room, equipped with computers, chairs, dean's offices: 23 computer work places. First-aid post is located on the 1st floor of the building number 3 and a reading room with a lending library is located in building No. 3

Academic building No. 5 (Foreign Languages Department). Location: Lenin Ave., 89A, 129A, Mariupol. 2-storey building with lecture halls, classrooms, chairs, deans' offices, a reading room, sports room, computer room, laboratories, a buffet. Athletic and sports area facilities: a circular running track, sports ground. Training Facilities: TV, DVD players. Other facilities: 1 computer room, equipped with computers: 14 computer work places

Dormitory of Mariupol State University In 2004, to the balance of the university was adopted a 9-storey building located at Budivelnykiv Ave., with floor area 7001, 2 meters. Currently MSU students from Donetsk, Luhansk, Zaporizhzhya, Dnipropetrovsk, Poltava, Kherson, Lviv region, from the Autonomous Republic of Crimea, foreign students live in the dormitory. There are all conditions for comfortable living and studying. In the dormitory, there are recreation areas, study rooms, a kitchen with an electric stove, a gym.

== Institutes and faculties ==
=== Philology Department ===
Dean: Doctor of Philology, Professor Bezchotnikova Svetlana Majors:

- Ukrainian Language and Literature
- Language and Literature (Russian) (specialization: Computational Linguistics; World Literature)
- Interpretation (Ukrainian, Russian, Polish)
- Pre-School Education (specialization: foreign language (English); choreography; physical education, practical psychology, speech therapy)
- Practical Psychology
- Journalism
- Advertisement and Public Relations

Chairs:

- Ukrainian Philology
- Russian Philology and Interpretation
- Early Childhood Education
- Education and Psychology
- Social Communications
- English
- Physical Education

At the department function:

- Centre of Ukrainian Studies
- Center of Polish Culture
- Interactive Learning Lab
- spiritual and cognitive development Lab of an individual
- specialized classrooms: Training rooms emotional discharge and individual counseling
- training studio, Press Club, Film Club
- Studio with learning English «Language studio».

=== History Department ===
Dean: doctor of historical sciences, professor Viktoriya Feofanivna Lysak. Majors:

- Document Management and Informational Activity
- History
- Foreign Affairs

Chairs:

- history
- study of culture and Information Activities
- International Relations and Foreign Policy
- Politics, Philosophy and Sociology

At the department function:

- Centre for Gender Studies and Education of Mariupol State University
- Information and Analysis Center for interethnic communication
- regional representative office of Ukrainian professional edition on philosophy, political science and history "Gilea"

=== Economics & Law Department ===
Dean: Doctor of Economic Sciences, Professor of the Department of Rational Nature Management and Environmental Protection Tolpezhnikov Roman Oleksiyovych Majors:

- Law
- International Economics
- Office Management (specialization: Tourism Industry Management, management
- hotel and restaurant business, regional government)
- Ecology, Environmental Protection and Balanced Nature
- Local government

Chairs:

- Constitutional, Administrative and International Law
- Economic, civil and labor Law
- International Economics
- Management
- Mathematical Methods
- Economic Theory
- The Environmental Management and Protection

At the department function:

- Representative office of European Public Law Organization in Ukraine
- Criminalistics Laboratory
- Laboratory for research of the International Economics sub-Department, established with the support of TEMPUS
- Law clinic "YurAzov'ya" organized by law Students' Association of Department to provide free legal assistance to retirees and low-income groups of Mariupol

=== Foreign Languages Department ===
Dean: Candidate of Sciences in Social Communications, Associate Professor of the Department of Italian Philology, Hanna Valeriivna Trifonova

Majors:

- English Language and Literature
- German Language and Literature
- Interpretation (English)
- Management Education Institute (general education institution)

Chairs:

- English philology
- German philology
- English language and interpretation
- Education Management and Pedagogy

At the faculty function:

- Israel and China cultural centers
- linguaphone Center

== Honorary professors ==
President of Hellenic Republic Konstantinos Stephanopoulos (1997)

- Secretary General for Greeks Abroad Stavros Lambrinidis (1998)
- Rector of University of Ioannina (Greece) Professor Dimitros Glaros (1998)
- Minister for Education and Religious Affairs of Hellenic Republic Grigorios Arsenis (1999)
- Deputy Minister of Foreign Affairs of Hellenic Republic Grigorios Niotis (2000)
- Rector of Donetsk National University, Academician of the National Academy of Sciences of Ukraine, Professor Volodymyr Shevchenko (2001)
- Vice President of the National Academy of Sciences of Ukraine, Academician of the National Academy of Sciences of Ukraine, Professor Ivan Kuras (2001)
- Minister of Education and Culture of Republic of Cyprus Ouranios Ioannides (2003)
- Deputy Minister of Foreign Affairs of Hellenic Republic Yiannis Mangriotis (2003)
- Prime Minister of Hellenic Republic, Head of the Party "New Democracy" Kostas Karamanlis (2003)
- Head of Anastasios G. Leventis Foundation Professor Vassos Karageorghis (2004)
- Deputy Minister of Foreign Affairs of Hellenic Republic Panagiotis Skandalakis (2005)
- President of the Academy of Pedagogical Sciences of Ukraine, Academician of the National Academy of Sciences of Ukraine, Professor Vasyl Kremen (2006)
- President of Hellenic Republic Karolos Papoulias (2006)
- High commissioner for Cyprus in the United Kingdom Georgios Iacovou (2007)
- Director of the Italian Institute of Culture in Ukraine Nicola Franco Balloni (2008)
- Dean of Political Science Faculty of University of Messina, Professor Andrea Romano (2009)
- President of Anastasios G. Leventis Foundation, Head of the Board of Directors of "Leventis Group" (Cyprus) Anastasios Paul Leventis (2010)
- President of the Republic of Cyprus Demetris Christofias (2011)
- Director of International and Investor Relations of "System Capital Management" Jock Mendoza-Wilson (2011)

== Awards and reputation ==
According to the Order of the Cabinet of Ministers of Ukraine No. 22525 dated of December 28, 2011, "for the tangible contribution into development of national education, strengthening of the international authority of Ukraine and training of highly qualified specialists" the employees of Mariupol State University were awarded the certificate of honour of the Cabinet of Ministers of Ukraine. MSU positions in national and international academic rankings:

- Ranking of universities in Ukraine, III, IV levels of accreditation "Top-200 Ukraine- 2010" of the European Centre for Higher Education (UNESCO-CEPES) and the Centre "EuroEducation" – assumed 100th spot in the ranking.
- "Best classical Ukrainian universities ranking" (Ministry of Education, Science Youth and Sports of Ukraine) – assumed 24th spot in the ranking.
- Ranking of Ukrainian universities according to the law majors "Compass 2012" – assumed 7th spot in the ranking.

== See also ==
List of universities in Ukraine
