= Vinsent =

Belarusian singer, hip-hop artist and actor

Vinsent Dzmitry Papko
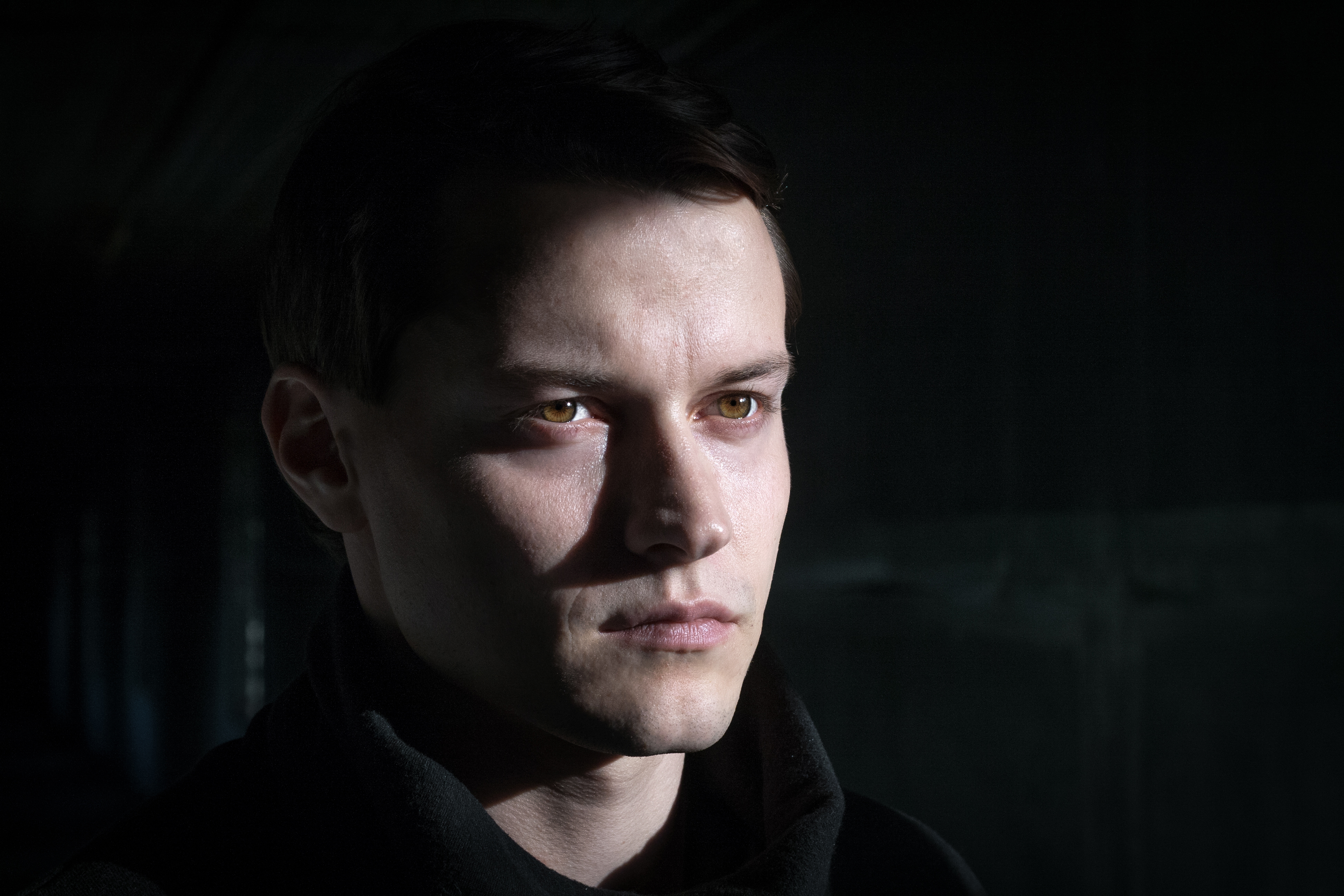
- Born: Dzmitry Uladzіmіravich Papko; 3 October 1988 (age 37); Ivatsevichi, BSSR, USSR (now Belarus)
- Education: Belarusian State University
- Occupations: Singer, actor
- Years active: 2007 – present

Vinsent, real name Dzmitry Uladzіmіravich Papko (Belarusian: Дзмітрый Уладзіміравіч Папко; born 3 October 1988) is a Belarusian singer, hip-hop artist, and actor.

Vinsent writes and performs songs in the Belarusian language. Initially, he performed solo. Now he sings, accompanied by a band.

The main theme of his songs is social problems. Besides writing, performing and recording his own music, Vinsent translates lyrics into Belarusian for other bands.

== Biography ==
Vinsent was born in the city of Ivatsevichi, Byelorussian SSR, Soviet Union (now Belarus). He graduated from the Faculty of Journalism of Belarusian State University with a major in Directing Television.

In 2007, he had his debut musical performance on the stage of BSU.

Vinsent became famous in 2008 as a Belarusian language hip-hop artist.

In the same year, he recorded the song "Адыходзяць караблі" (The Ships Depart), which twice won first place in the hit parade of Belarusian music portal Tuzin.fm.

In February 2009 Vinsent's debut album "Пачатак" (The Beginning) was released on the label BMA Group.

Music videos were filmed for the song Vinsent "Працягваю жыць" (I carry on living) and "Восеньскі вальс" (Autumn Waltzer).

Vinsent's acting career began with the announcement of the youth film "Вышэй за неба" (Above the Sky). The artist offered a film director to write the soundtrack for the film. The director invited him to participate in the film.

In 2011 the film "Жыве Беларусь" ("Viva Belarus") was filmed. Vinsent played the lead role. The film won second place in the Czech film competition Febiofest 2013.

In April 2013, Vinsent said that upon arrival in Belarus after the filming "Жыве Беларусь" ("Viva Belarus") the Belarusian secret services began to haunt him. They called him in for questioning. The diagnoses that gave the actor a respite from the army, were cancelled. Authorities banned him from travelling abroad.

In November 2015, Vinsent presented his new music video "Жывы" (Alive). Then he announces the release of his new album. On 9 December 2015, Vinsent released the album "VIR". The album was presented on 16 December 2015 in Minsk club Пляцоўка хол. The album was also presented in London on 19 December.

== Discography ==
=== Albums ===
- 2009 — «Пачатак» (Start)
- 2015 — «VIR»

=== Singles ===
- 2010 — «Развага» (Razwaha), feat. BN

=== Music videos ===
- «Працягваю жыць» (I Continue to Live)
- «Восеньскі вальс» (Autumn Waltz)
- «Ні кроку назад» (Not One Step Back)
- «Жывы» (Alive)

== Films ==
- 2012 Viva Belarus! as Miron Zakharka
- 2012 Above the Sky as Maxim
