= Mykola Trofymenko =

Ukrainian academic

- Трофименко Микола Валерійович
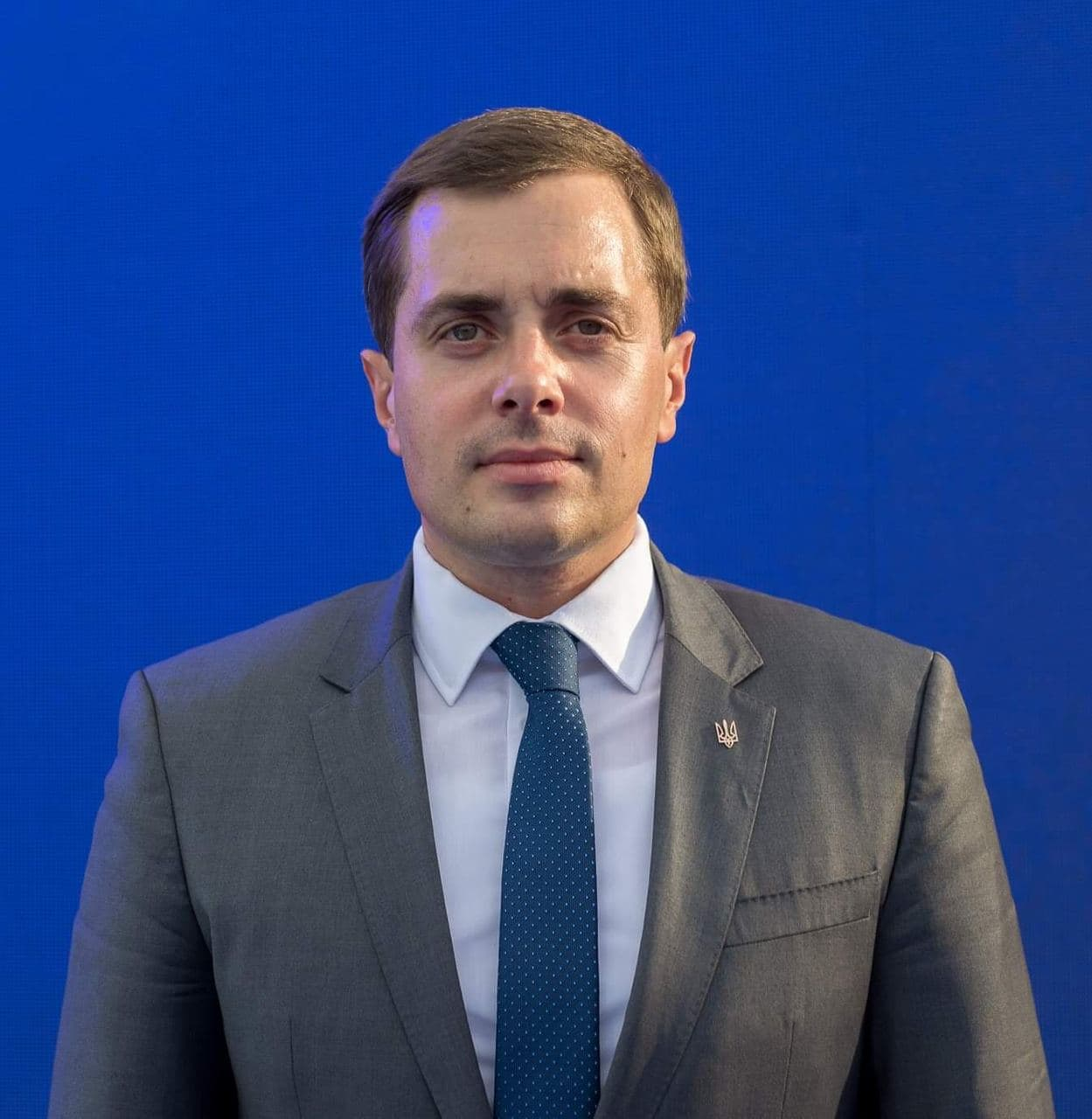
- Born: 8 April 1985 (age 41); Mariupol
- Citizenship: Ukrainian
- Education: Mariupol State University
- Occupation: Rector
- Website: mu.edu.ua

Mykola Trofymenko (born April 8, 1985) is a Ukrainian Doctor of Political Science. He is Associate Professor of International Relations and Foreign Policy, Rector of Mariupol State University, Honoured Education Employee of Ukraine.

== Biography ==
=== Education ===
In 2002 he graduated from Mariupol Secondary School №41 and entered Mariupol State University with a degree in International Relations. He has Bachelor and Master degree majoring in International relations. After that he successfully finished Postgraduate studies at Mariupol State University, major 23.00.02 – political institutes and processes. Defended his dissertation at the I.F. Kuras Institute of Political and Ethnic Studies and received political science PhD in 2011.

Since 2014 he is an Associate Professor of International Relations and Foreign Policy at MSU.

Fluent in Ukrainian, English, Greek, Russian.

In May 2024, Mykola Trofymenko completed his dissertation on “Political Problems of International Systems and Global Development” at Taras Shevchenko National University of Kyiv, receiving the degree of Doctor of Political Science.

=== Professional and scientific activities ===
From 2007 to 2011 he had been a Head of the International Relations Department of Mariupol State University.

From 2011 to 2020 he had been a Vice-Rector for Scientific and Pedagogical Work (International Relations) of Mariupol State University.

Since 2008 he is an Assistant, Senior Lecturer, Associate Professor, Professor of the Department of International Relations and Foreign Policy at Mariupol State University.

From 2018 to 2020 he had been an Adviser to the Head of Donetsk Regional State Administration - Head of the Regional Military-Civil Administration, Head of Mariupol Office of Donetsk Regional State Administration

2018 – Participant in the US Department of State's programme «Institute on U.S. National Security Policymaking 2018» (University of Delaware).

2019 – up to now Participant of the project "Innovative University and Leadership. Phase V: Interdisciplinarity, intersectoral and university development strategies" (Republic of Poland)

In October 2020, Mykola Trofymenko was elected to the Mariupol City Council of the 8th convocation from the Vadym Boichenko Bloc party. In the city council, he joined the Vadym Boichenko Bloc party parliamentary faction and chaired the standing parliamentary commission on education, culture, spiritual revival, youth and sports.

Since 2020 he is a Rector of Mariupol State University. Mykola Trofymenko successfully continues to implement the unique model of international cooperation, developed at the university. Mykola Trofymenko is an author of more than 150 scientific publications, including textbooks, monographs and scientific articles in domestic and foreign science journals.

Mykola Trofymenko is an author of more than 150 scientific publications, including textbooks, monographs and scientific articles in domestic and foreign science journals.

His research interests include issues of foreign policy, public diplomacy, globalization, anti-globalization, the functioning of the diplomatic and consular services.

Since 2015 he is a Member of the Board of Directors of the European Public Law Organization (Athens, Hellenic Republic).

=== Awards ===
2014-2016 Scholarship holder of the Cabinet of Ministers of Ukraine for young scientists

2014 A valuable gift from the Chairman of the Verkhovna Rada of Ukraine

2017 Certificate of Honour of the Cabinet of Ministers of Ukraine

2020 Honoured Education Employee of Ukraine (Decree of the President of Ukraine № 186/2020 15.05.2020)

2021 Badge of Honor of the Trade Union of Education and Science Workers of Ukraine “For Social Partnership”

2021 Gratitude Certificate of Mariupol District Council and District State Administration

2021 Merit Certificate of the Committee for the Human Rights, Deoccupation and Reintegration of the Temporary Occupied Territories in Donetsk and Luhansk Regions, Autonomous Republic of Crimea, city of Sevastopol, National Minorities and international Relations of Verkhovna Rada of Ukraine

2021 Merit Certificate of Donetsk State Regional Administration, Donetsk Regional Military-Civil Administration

2021 Medal of the Holy Great Martyr St. George the Victorious

2024 Cross of the Knight of the Order of Merit of Lithuania

== Links ==
1. Mariupolio universiteto rektorius tris savaites skaičiavo žuvusiuosius, o penkiametį sūnų slėpė rūsyje: Putinui to niekada neatleisiu // LRT, 19.03.2022
2. I don't know what people could do this // BBC Radio 4 today, 22.03.2022
3. Reitor da Universidade de Mariupol: Terceira Guerra Mundial já começou "há muito" // SAPO24, 26.03.2022
4. Πρύτανης πανεπιστημίου Μαριούπολης στον ΣΚΑΪ: Παίρνουν τους νεκρούς στις αυλές -Νερό βρίσκαμε από το χιόνι // SKAI, 28.03.2022
5. Ukraine - Eyewitness Account from Mariupol // RTE, 28.03.2022
6. Ukraine - Latest from Mariupol // RTE, 12.04.2022
7. Mariupol city council member recounts his ordeal // TRT World, 04.04.2022
8. Наш університет має стати символом відновлення міста-героя Маріуполя // Світ, 15.04.2022
9. "Ми доводимо, головне не стіни, а люди" — Маріупольський державний університет переїхав у Київ // Suspilne Donbas, 17.04.2022
10. Developments and consequences of Russia's special military operation in Ukraine // Al24news, 19.04.2022
11. Putin: conquistata Mariupol - Otto e Mezzo - Puntata del // LA7, 21.04.2022
12. Як працює університет з Маріуполя? // Donbas 24, 09.05.2022
13. Як ректор Маріупольського вишу перевіз університет до Києва // Morning Show 1+1, 30.06.2022
14. Історія евакуації Маріупольського державного університету // КИЇВ24, 01.09.2022
15. Ukrainians in exile plan to rebuild Russian-occupied home city with help from University of Hull // The Guardian, 03.03.2024
16. З попелу до університету майбутнього: як релокований Маріупольський державний університет працює в Києві // Східний Варіант, 20.03.2024
17. Mariupol State University: The Invincible University // The World of Higher Education, 04.04.2024
18. Jestem przekonany, że wrócimy do Mariupola // Forum Akademickie, 04.06.2024
19. War has not dampened Ukrainian scholars’ courage to think // University World News, 18.07.2024
20. «Ми — один із символів відбудови України і це тільки початок» // Точка Сходу, 10.10.2024
