= Serguei Kouchnerov =

American film director (born 1960)

- Сяргей Кушняроў
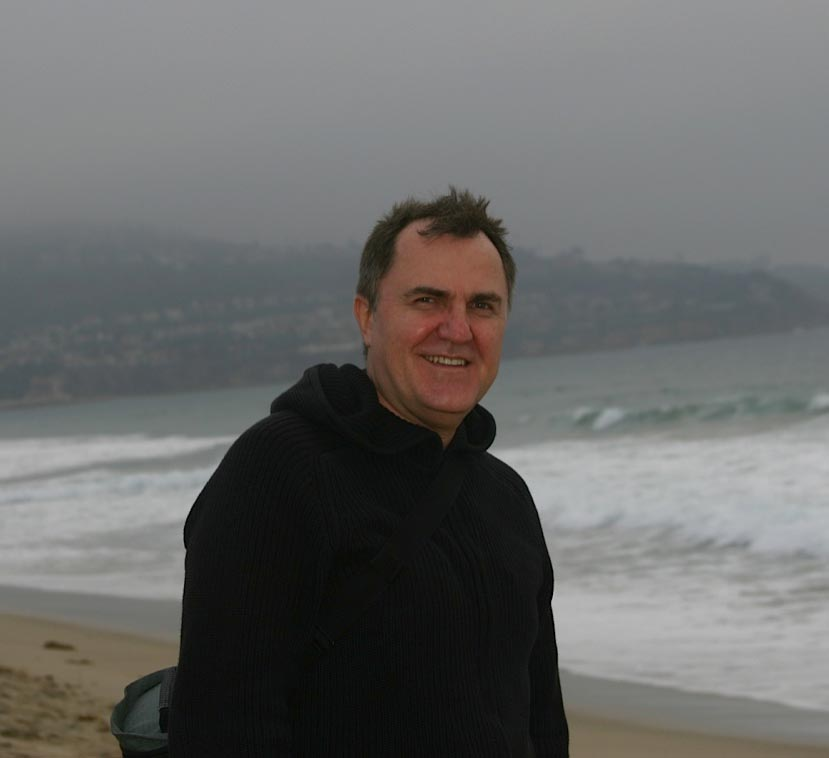
- Born: 22 June 1960 (age 65); Rahachow, Byelorussian SSR, Soviet Union
- Occupations: Animator, story artist, director, screenwriter
- Years active: 1980s–present
- Known for: Treasure Island (1988); The Prince of Egypt (1998); Madagascar (2005)

Serguei Kouchnerov (Siarhiej Kušniaroŭ, Belarusian: Сяргей Кушняроў, born 22 June 1960 in Rahachow, Byelorussian SSR) is a Belarusian-Ukrainian artist, animator, director, story artist and screenwriter. He started his career as an animator and director in Kiev, Ukraine. In 1992, he was hired by Walt Disney Feature Animation as a character animator and came to the United States of America, where he currently lives and works at Illumination Entertainment.

== Career ==
Serguei worked for Kyivnaukfilm in Kyiv, Ukraine (then part of the Soviet Union) on the animated feature film Treasure Island (1988) and on many other animated short films. After moving to the United States he worked for Walt Disney Feature Animation on Fantasia 2000 before joining DreamWorks Animation for such animated feature films as The Prince of Egypt (1998), The Road to El Dorado (2000), Shrek 2 (2004), Bee Movie (2007), Madagascar (2005), Over the Hedge (2006), and Madagascar 2 (2008). One of his recent works was a CGI animated short film entitled The Hybrid Union.

== Filmography ==
As Director
The Hybrid Union (CGI animated short film, 2010)
The Log (Animated short film, 1988)
A Vicious Circle, (Animated short film, 1988)
The muddle-headed/Hopeless Wombat (Animated short film, 1991)

As Supervising animator / Character animator
Madagascar 2 (2008) (Character animator) – DreamWorks Animation
Bee Movie (2007) (Character animator) – DreamWorks Animation
Over the Hedge (2006) (Character animator) – DreamWorks Animation
Madagascar (2005) (Character animator) – DreamWorks Animation
Shrek 2 (2004) (Character animator) – DreamWorks Animation
Sinbad: Legend of the Seven Seas (2003) (Supervising animator) – DreamWorks Animation
Spirit: Stallion of the Cimarron (2002) (Character animator) – DreamWorks Animation
The Road to El Dorado (2000) (Supervising animator) – DreamWorks Animation
The Prince of Egypt (1998) (Supervising animator) – DreamWorks Animation
Fantasia 2000 (2000) (Character animator, Character design) – Walt Disney Animation
The Lion King (1994) (Game/Animator) – Walt Disney Animation
Treasure Island (1988) (Lead animator) – Kievnauchfilm Kiev, Ukraine (then Soviet Union) (Russian)
As Storyboard Artist
Sinbad: Legend of the Seven Seas (2003) – DreamWorks Animation
Bob's Burgers – (Animated TV Series/FOX)
As Story Artist
The Super Mario Bros. Movie (2023) – (Illumination Entertainment / Universal Pictures)
Minions: The Rise of Gru (2022) – (Illumination Entertainment / Universal Pictures)
The Secret Life of Pets 2 (2019) – (Illumination Entertainment / Universal Pictures)
The Secret Life of Pets (2016) – (Illumination Entertainment / Universal Pictures)
Chicken Run (2000) – DreamWorks Animation / Aardman
