= Svetlana Zelenkovskaya =

Belarusian actress

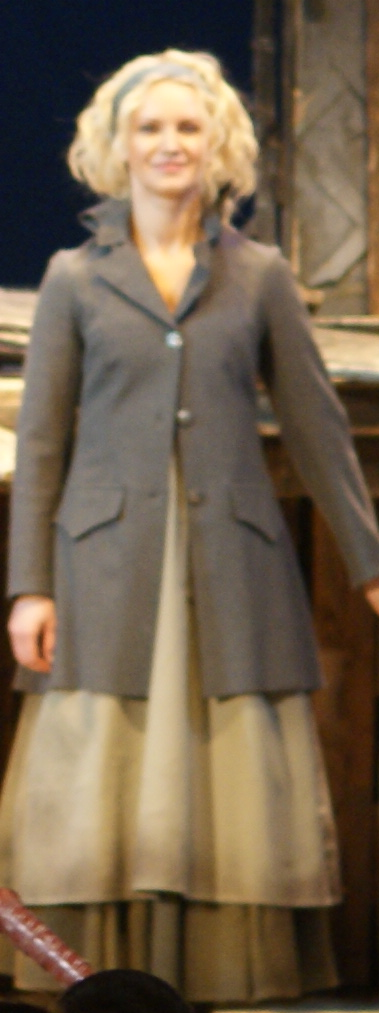
- Born: 29 May 1977 (age 48)
- Citizenship: Belarus
- Occupation: Actress

Svetlana Zelenkovskaya (Belarusian: Святлана Генадзеўна Зелянкоўская, born 1977) is a Belarusian and Ukrainian theater and film actress.

== Biography ==
Zelenkovskaya was born in Minsk, Belarus, on 29 May 1977. From 1998 to 2017, she was performing at the Yanka Kupala National Academic Theater (Minsk, Belarus).

=== Theater ===
==== Yanka Kupala National Theater ====
- Pyramid of Cheops (Tanya)
- Eternal Phoma (Nastenka)
- KIM (Julia)
- Idyll (Dancer)
- Forest (Aksyusha)
- A Midsummer Night Dream (Elena)
- Pavlinka (Pavlinka)
- Black Lady Nesvizh (Barbara Radziwil)
- Lost Paradise (Eve)
- SV (Charlotte)
- Chichikov (wife of the police chief)
- Snow Queen (Snow Queen)
- Maestro (Ilona, French horn)
- Macbeth (Lady Macbeth)
- Vanyushin's children

==== Production center "Magic" ====
- Woyzeck (Maria)

==== Contemporary Art Theater ====
- FM Muchevo
- The Secret of the Dance

=== Films ===
- 1983 - The Tale of the Star Boy
- 1985 - Come and See
- 2000 - Kamenskaya
- 2003 - Anastasia Slutskaya - Princess Anastasia Slutskaya
- 2003 - Occupation. Mysteries - Eve
- 2005 - Three Tallers - Mother
- 2006 - Vaccine
- 2006 - Your Honor
- 2006 - I am a Detective
- 2007 - Major Vetrov - Blonde
- 2008 - Riorita - German Prisoner
- 2009 - Semin. Life Merchants - Brunette
- 2009 - Court.
- 2010 - Masakra - Landowner Ostrovskaya
- 2010 - The Irony of Luck
- 2010 - Zhurov-2
- 2010 - Assassination Attempt - Inga, the registrar at a German hospital
- 2011 - Lonely Island

== See also ==
- Светлана Зеленковская: я сильно изменилась после встречи с Михалком, интервью 2018 г.
- Светлана Зеленковская получила вид на жительство в Украине, статья 2016 г.
