= Yelena Trofimenko =

Belarusian film director, producer, actress, and writer

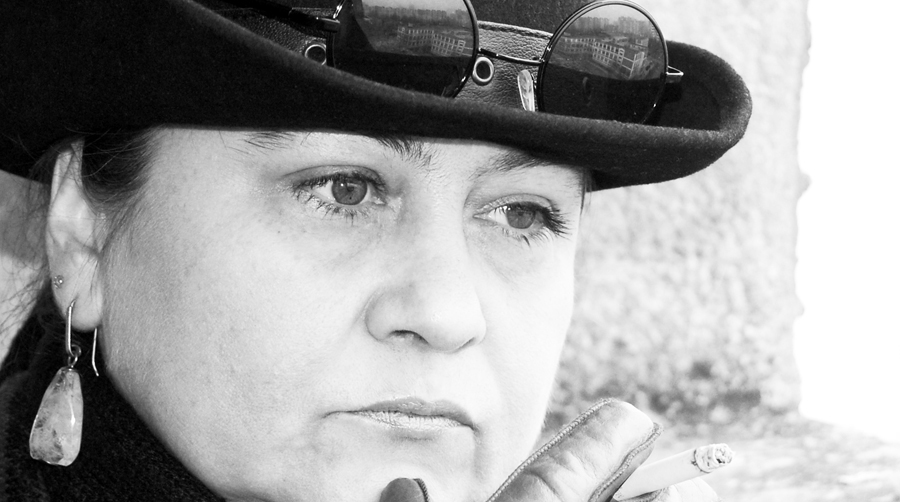
- Yelena Trofimenko, 2011
- Born: Yelena Nicolaevna Trofimenko; 20 March 1964 (age 62); Minsk, USSR
- Occupations: Film director, screenwriter
- Years active: 1986-present
- Spouse: Leonid Tereshko (1961-present)

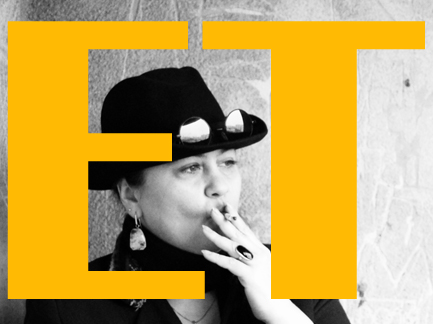
ET, 2011

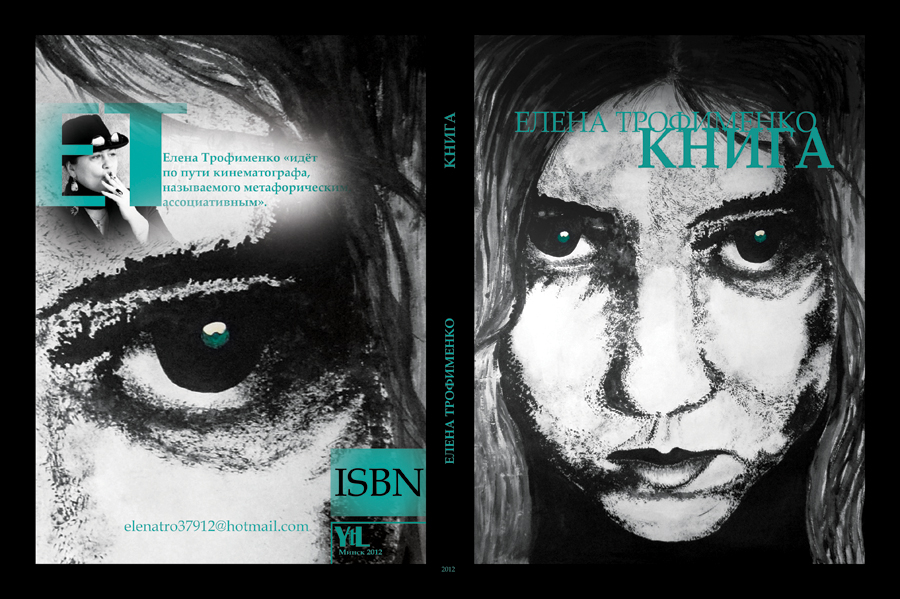
The Book by Yelena Trofimenko, design and layout by Yaroslav Tereshko

Yelena Nicolaevna Trofimenko (born March 20, 1964) is a Belarusian film director, producer, screenwriter, author, actress and poet.

== Biography ==
Trofimenko was born on 20 March 1964 in Minsk, Belarus. In 1996, she became a director at the Belarusfilm studio. In 1998, her first full-length film Falling Upward, was released.

In 1996, Trofimenko became a member of the Belarusian Union of Cinematographers and, in 1998, a member of board of directors. She is a founder, originator and artistic director of the creative studio Youth Studio XXI (Belarusfilm, 2002). Festival of one film was created at this studio.

In 2012, Trofimenko created a collection of poems and reproductions, The Book.

== Filmography ==
Year	Title	Genre	Role	Prize and rewards
1986	Memory and Conscience	Documentary	Director, screenwriter	
1989	Life	Video-novel	Director, screenwriter, actress	
1991	Birds are Still Singing...	Coursework	Director, screenwriter	Movie participated in Women's International Film and Arts festival, Germany, 1992
1992	Hell is...	Coursework (adaptation of the play No Exit, sometime known as Behind closed doors by Jean-Paul Sartre	Director, screenwriter	
1993	The Judgment	Final graduation work (by Franz Kafka)	Director, screenwriter, actress	The movie has participated in Youth Festival in Kiev, Ukraine, 1994.
1994	Rendezvous	Final work, documentary, FEMIS	Director	
1995–1996	The Box Man	Five authors' television programs, talk-show hostess	Producer, director, presenter	
1996	Help	Documentary	Director, producer, screenwriter	
1997	Svetlana	Documentary	Director	
1998	Falling Upward	play movie	director, producer, screenwriter	Jury diploma – "For debut and artistic quest in genre of modern fairytale movie making" Prize of Belarusian foundation of culture development – "For ingenuity of director’s vision" in Minsk, Belarus, 1999; Women’s International Film and Arts festival 1999; diploma – "For successful combination of a fantasy world with reality, for efficacious employment of computer graphics in movie making" – with regards to the author to continue this experiment XXIX Festival, Lagov, Poland, 1999; Participated in the II All-Russia Festival of Visual Arts "Eaglet" in Tuapse, Russia, 1998; Participated in the International Film Festival in Cottbus, Germany, 1998.
2000	Eclectic-show	Mega-clip	Director, screenwriter	
2004	The fear	Short	Director	"Golden Knight" prize in the category - shorties MCC "Golden Knight" (in the anthology "The territory of the resistance")
2005	Dreams of Eli	Documentary	Director of the filming reconstructions	

== Performances ==
Year	Title	Role	Note
1990	Testament Rodin	Author, director, actress	Student performance on Auguste Rodin
1991	The Good Soldier Švejk	Author, director, actress	Student performance on Jaroslav Hašek
1991	The Box Man	Author, director, actress	Student performance on Kōbō Abe
1992	Leaf Litter	Author, director, actress	Student performance on Vasily Rozanov
1992	Demons	Author, director, actress	Student performance on Fyodor Dostoyevsky
1993	Chairs	Author, director, actress	Diploma performance on Eugène Ionesco
2004	Reading Kharms	Author, director	Performance on D. Harms in student theater (ISEU. Sakharov)
2004	Bald Singer	Author, director	Performance of Eugène Ionesco in student theater (ISEU. Sakharov); Prize at the XI Festival of Francophone Theatre in Minsk, 2004
2005	Against AIDS	Author, director	Performance in student theater (ISEU. Sakharov)
2006	The Human Voice	Author, director	Performance in student theater (ISEU. Sakharov), written by Jean Cocteau
