= Vladimir Kozlov (director) =

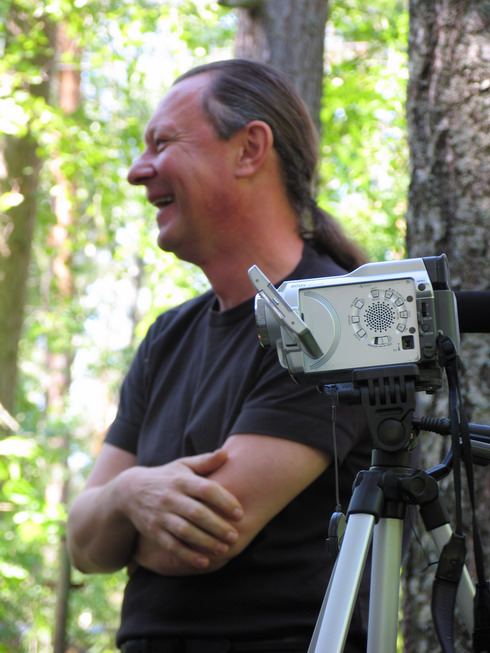
- Born: Vladimir Kozlov; 7 June 1956 (age 69); Minsk, Belarus
- Occupations: Film director, screenwriter
- Years active: 2002 – present
- Website: Vladimir Kozlov

Vladimir Kozlov (Козлов Владимир Георгиевич, Belarusian: Уладзімір Георгіевіч Казлоў), born 7 June 1956, is a film director and screenwriter from Belarus.

== Biography ==
Kozlov was born in 1956 in Minsk and studied history at Belarus State University. He worked at Belarusfilm and Mosfilm as an assistant director (1978–1992), completing assistant and second unit director courses at VGIK (Moscow). Since then, he has been an actor and director in French stage theater companies, and a documentary film director in Russia and France.

== Filmography ==
Documentaries

- 2002 The Music and Colours of Father Leonid
- 2004 The small russian sister from the Sylvanes abbey
- 2006 Tugan Sokhiev, crescendo subito
- 2006, 2008 Youri Morozov
- 2011 Gagarinland
- 2011 Alexeï Léonov, the Spacewalker

Garonne-Volga,2012

Nicolas Gresny, 2013

Feature

- 2008 The Tenderness
- 2010 Merry Christmas, Vladimir
