= Novogrudok =

Town in Grodno Region, Belarus

Novogrudok Навагрудак (Belarusian) Новогрудок (Russian) Navahrudak
- Town
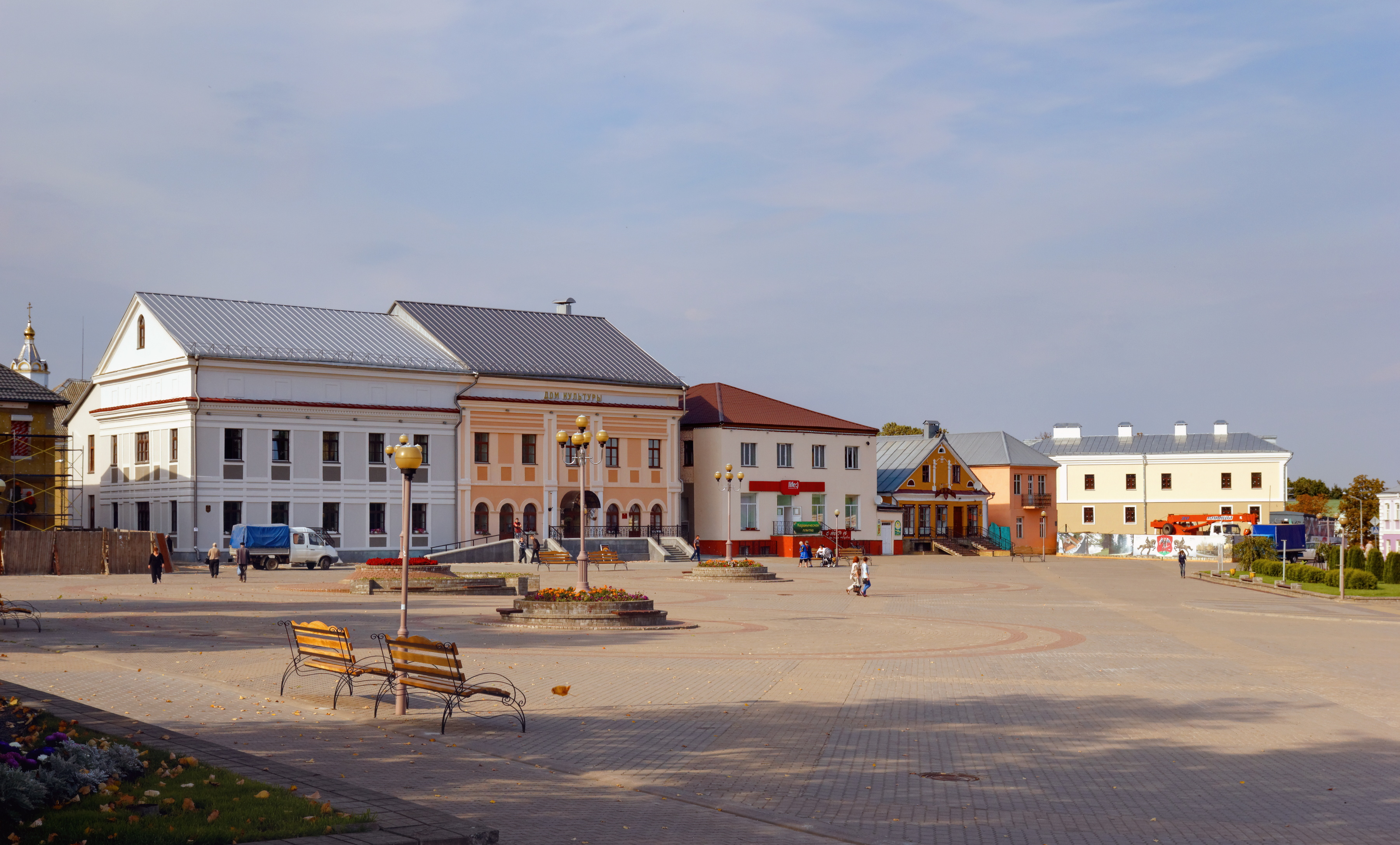
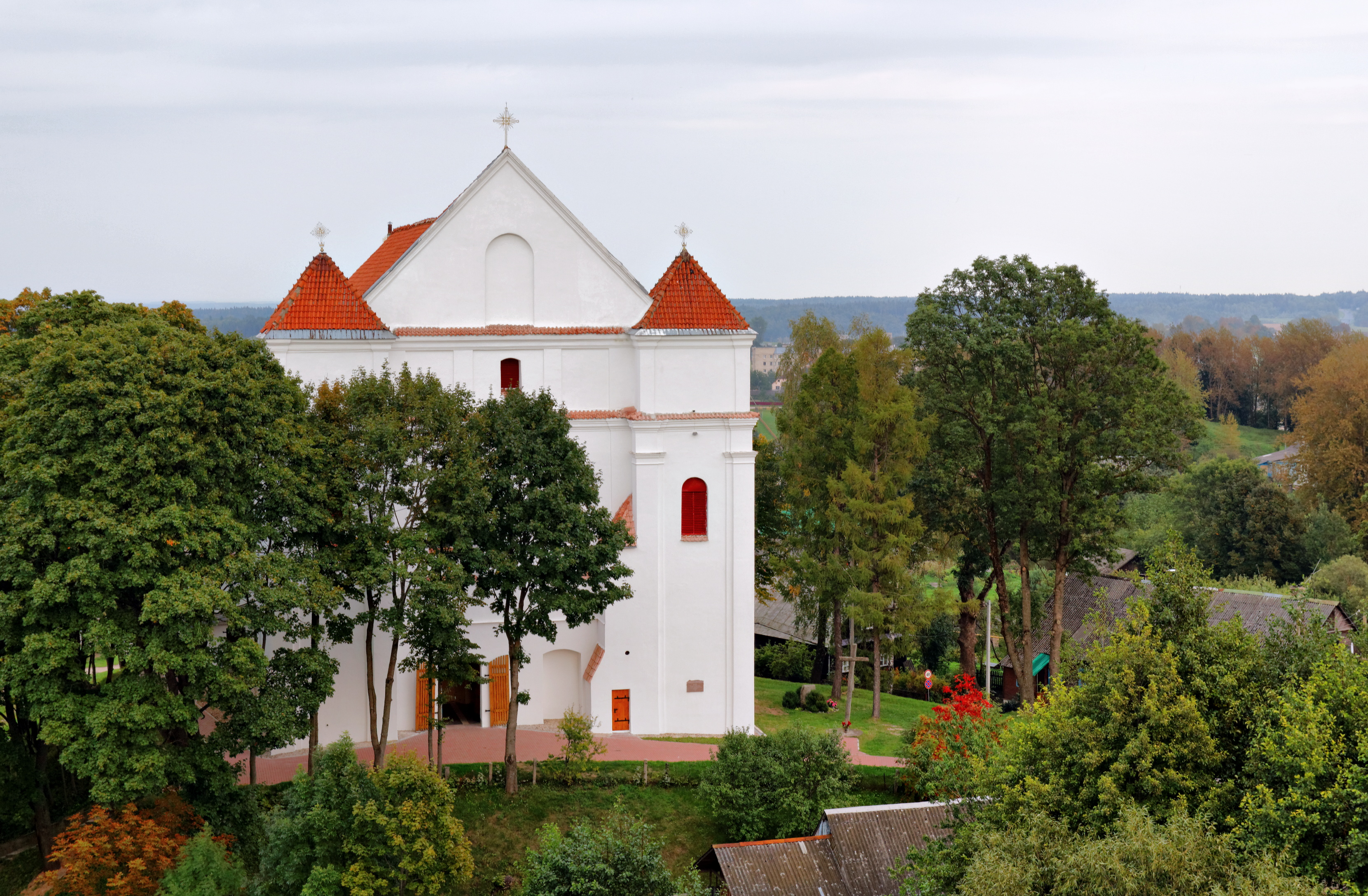
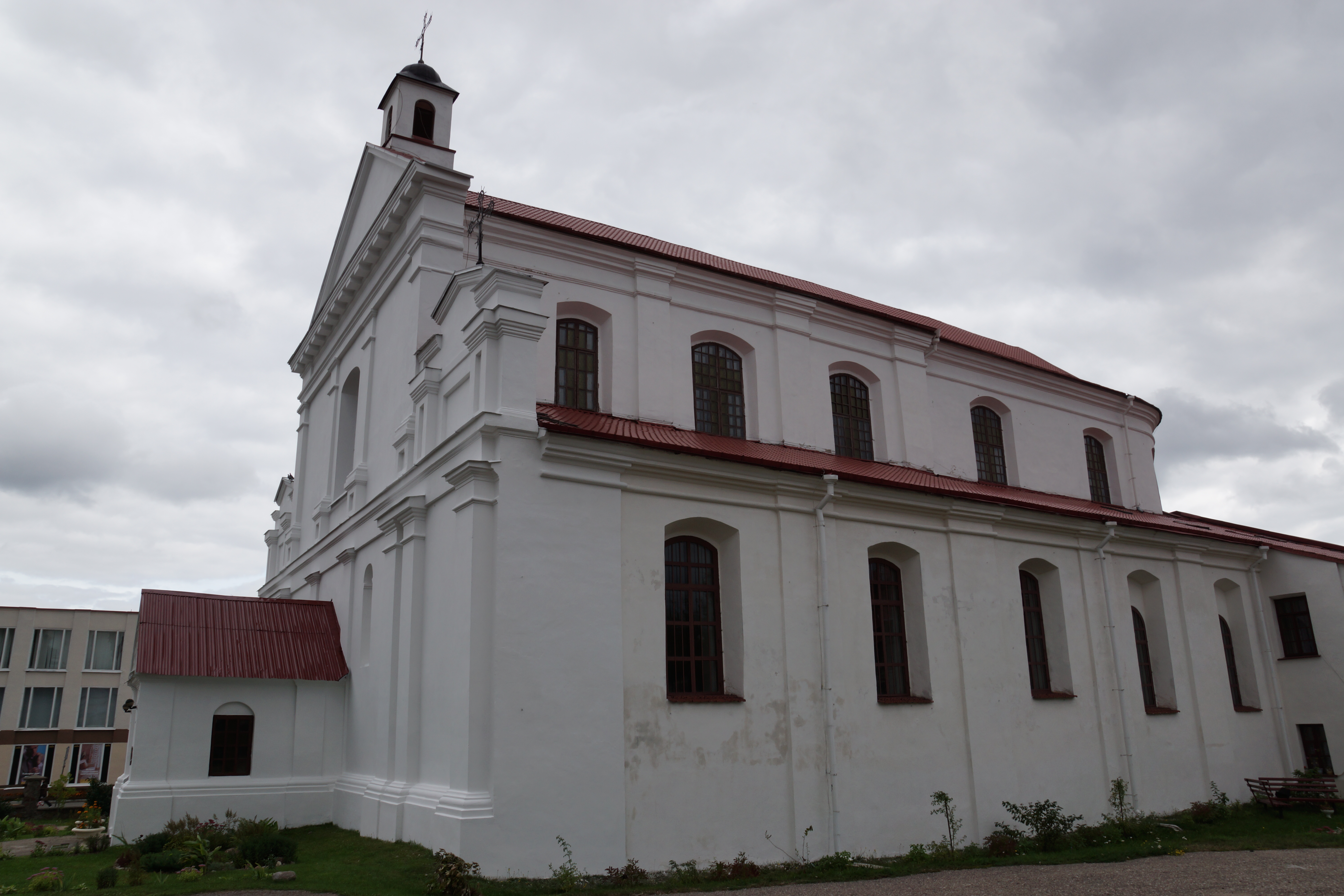
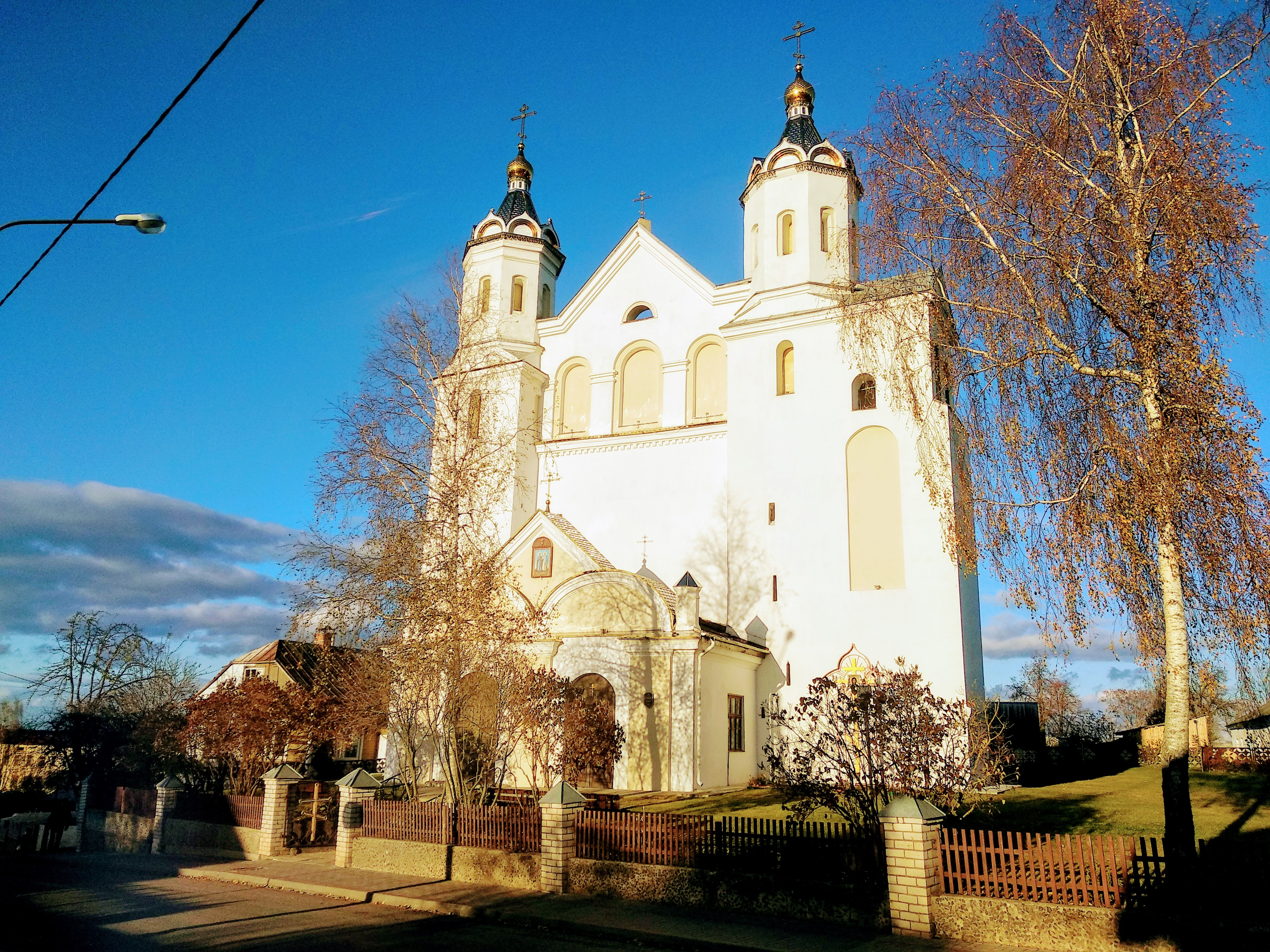
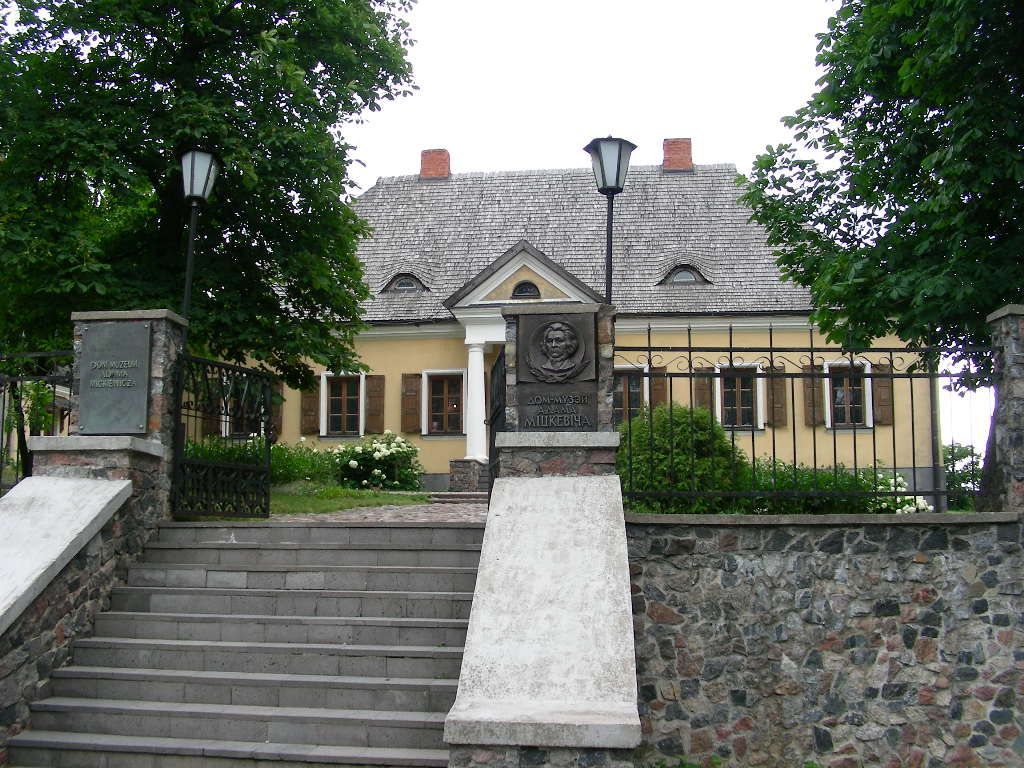
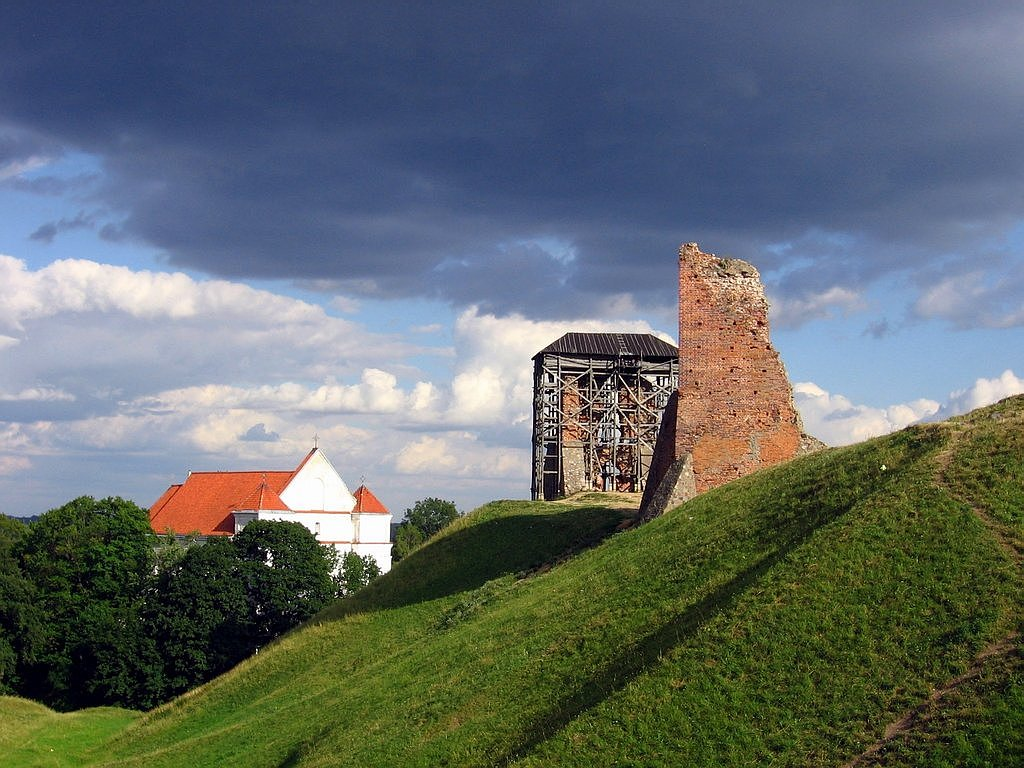
- Clockwise from top: the central square; Transfiguration Church; Church of St Michael the Archangel; Church of Boris and Gleb; House-Museum of Adam Mickiewicz; Castle

- Flag Coat of arms

- Navahrudak within Grodno Region
- Coordinates: 53°35′N 25°49′E
- Country: Belarus
- Region: Grodno Region
- District: Novogrudok District
- Founded: 970–990
- First mentioned: 1044
- Town rights since: 1444

Government
  - Chairman of the district Executive Committee: Fedchenko Sergey

Area
  - Total: 13.17 km^{2} (5.08 sq mi)
- Elevation: 292 m (958 ft)

Population (2025)
  - Total: 27,624
  - Density: 2,097/km^{2} (5,432/sq mi)
- Time zone: UTC+3 (MSK)
- Postal code: 231241, 231243, 231244, 231246, 231400
- Area code: +375 1597
- License plate: 4
- Website: Official website

Novogrudok or Navahrudak (Belarusian: Навагрудак; Russian: Новогрудок; Polish: Nowogródek, Lithuanian: Naugardukas; Yiddish: נאַוואַראַדאָק, romanized: Navaradok) is a town in Grodno Region, Belarus. It serves as the administrative center of Novogrudok District. As of 2025, it has a population of 27,624.

In the Middle Ages, the city was ruled by King Mindaugas' son Vaišvilkas.

During and after Mindaugas' rule, Novogrudok was part of the Kingdom of Lithuania, and later the Grand Duchy of Lithuania, which was later part of the Polish–Lithuanian Commonwealth. In the 14th century, it was an episcopal see of the Metropolitanate of Lithuania.

From 1795 to 1915, the Russian Empire ruled over the lands, with brief periods of intercession, e.g., Napoleon's Grande Armée in 1812 and the Uprisings of 1831 and 1863. After 1915, Novogrudok was occupied by the Imperial German Army for three years in World War I, by the Second Polish Republic until the Soviet invasion of Poland in 1939. Thereafter, the Soviet Union annexed the area to the Byelorussian SSR. From 1941 to 1944, Novogrudok was occupied by the German Army, thereafter returning to the Soviet Union until 1991.

== Toponymy ==
The name comes from the Old East Slavic words "New town". It was a large settlement in the remote Western lands of the Krivichs, which came under the control of the Ancient Rus' state at the end of the 10th century. The ancient name of Novgorodok (Nov'gorodok, Nov'gorodok', though leaning both parts: to Novagorodka, in Novegorodtsy, "between Novym'gorodkom'", from "Novagorodka" in "Novegorodche"). In some sources, it is called Maly Novgorod.

Excavations by the archaeologist F. D. Gurevich in different parts of the town produced many finds, including Byzantine glass, jewellery and the remains of a house with painted interior walls and hanging oil lamps. Gurevich dated the earliest settlements on the site to the end of the 10th century. The historian Mikola Yermalovich identified Novogrudok with the "Novgorod" that, according to the chronicles, Yaroslav the Wise founded after his campaign against the Lithuanians in 1044, and 1044 is often given as the year of the town's first mention. Gurevich rejected this identification, and other historians refer the 1044 entry to Novgorod the Great.

Locals use the older name "Navаgradak", especially the older people. The place of stress is recorded in the publication of the "Tribunal for the inhabitants of the Grand Duchy of Lithuania'" (Vilna, 1586), where it is marked in print "in Novа́gorodku".

At the time of entry into the Polish–Lithuanian Commonwealth, the traditional Belarusian pronunciation Navа́gradak led to Polish exonym Nowogródek. In turn, this led to the written Russian exonym Novogrudok, and the written Ukrainian exonym Novohrudok.

Some historians believe that the chronicle versions of the name of the city – Novogorod, Novgorodok, Novy Gorodok, Novogorodok-Litovsky, etc. indicate that, perhaps, there was an old city center of the district – Radogoshcha.

== History ==
=== Early history ===
Novogrudok was established in West Baltic, specifically Yotvingian–non identical to modern East Balts Lithuanians nor Latvians–lands Eastern Slavs, specifically Dregoviches and Volhynians, were the first settlers who established Novogrudok at the end of the 10th century. According to archaeological research conducted in Novogrudok in the 1960s, the settlements arose on modern Novogrudok's territory at the end of the 10th century, and the fortifications by the mid-11th century. Research also suggests that a city already existed on-site in the 9th–10th centuries, which had trade links with Byzantium, the Near East, Western Europe and Scandinavia. These trade links were related to the Amber Road. Archaeologically, Novogrudok was studied in the years 1957-1977. In the first half of the 11th century, the city consisted of two undefended settlements located on the Small castle and Castle hill. In the second half of the 11th century, fortifications were built around the settlement on the Castle hill, thus forming the Novogrudok detinets. On the Small Castle to the West of the detinets formed a settlement, which in the 12th century was also fortified and turned into a roundabout city.

On the territory of the detinets, wooden ground buildings with wood burning stoves made out of adobe and plank floors were studied. The most important activities of the city's population were crafts and trade. Often, there is evidence of local jewelry craft – there were foundries and jewelry workshops that formed a whole block on the small castle. Bone-cutting, wood and stone processing were also common. Graffiti with old Russian letters was found on fragments of frescoed plaster from building No.12 ("house of the boyar" or "powalush") of the 12th century on the Small Castle (an ancient roundabout city). Trade relations in the 12th–13th centuries were far-reaching, as evidenced by many imports: from Kyiv came glass bracelets, non-ferrous metal jewellery, engolpions, icons, spindle whorls, faience vessels from Iran, glassware from Byzantium and Syria, from the Baltic – amber.

Novogrudok was first mentioned in the Sofia First Chronicle and Novgorod Fourth Chronicle in 1044 in reference to a war between Yaroslav I and Lithuanian tribes. It was also mentioned in the Hypatian Codex in 1252 as Novogorodok, meaning "new little town". Novogrudok was a major settlement in the remote western lands of the Krivichs that came under Kievan Rus' control at the end of the 10th century. However, this hypothesis has been disputed as the earliest archaeological findings date from the 11th century.

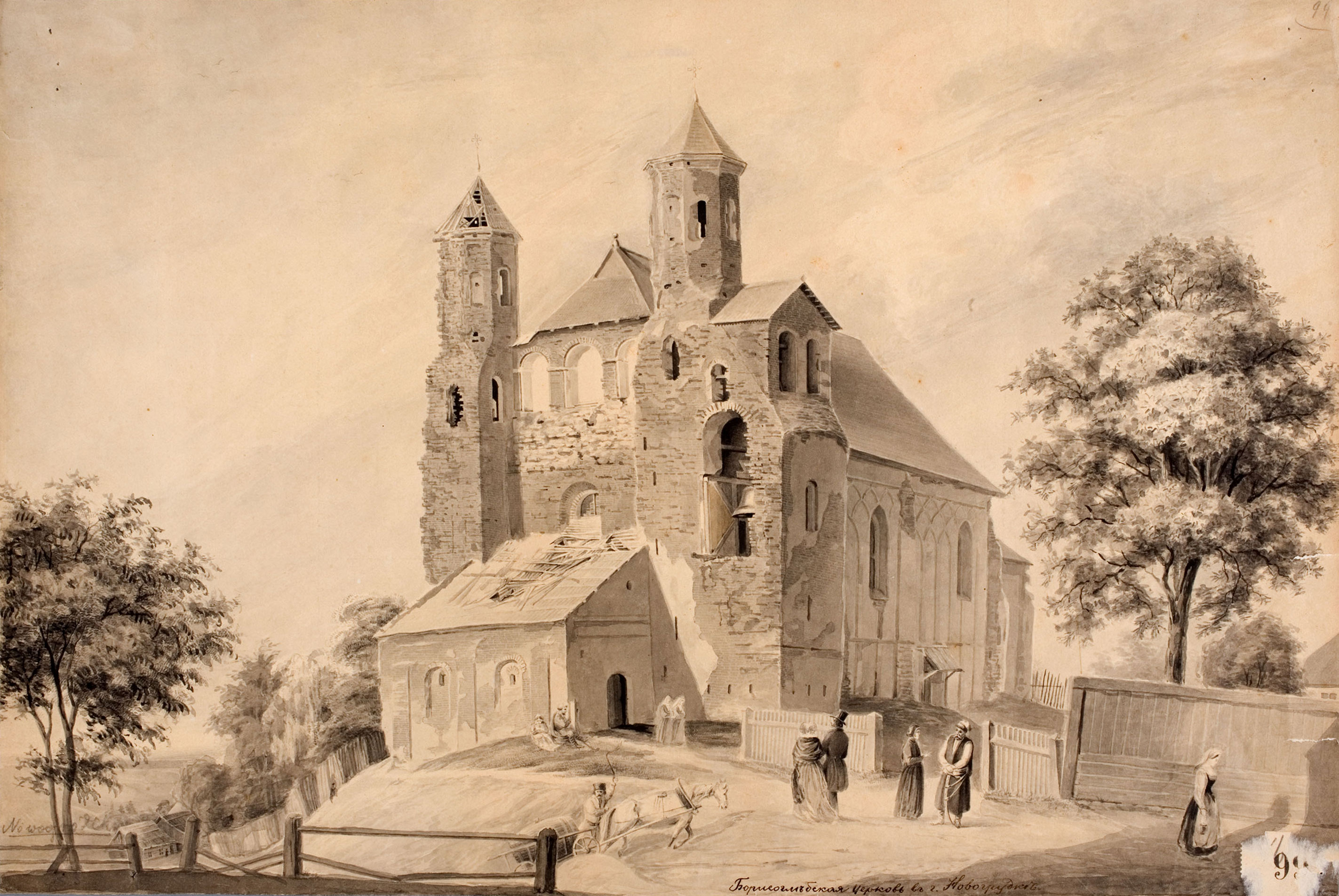
Church of Boris and Gleb drawing by Napoleon Orda.

=== Grand Duchy of Lithuania ===
==== 13th century ====
In the 13th century, Kievan Rus' disintegrated due to Asian nomadic incursions, which climaxed with the Mongol horde's Siege of Kiev (1240), resulting in the sack of Kiev. This left a regional geopolitical vacuum in which the East Slavs splintered along pre-existing tribal lines and formed several independent, competing principalities. It is known that even prior to Mindaugas' arrival, there was a Catholic church in Novogrudok.

Ruins of the Novogrudok Castle, destroyed in the 18th century, drawing by Napoleon Orda.

Maciej Stryjkowski asserts that Ringold's father, Algimunt, ruled in Novogrudok over all Rus' and Lithuania, starting from Vilija River up to Starodub, Chernigov, Turau and Karachaev, as well as all of Podlasie with its adjacent castles, Brest, Mielnik, Drohiczyn, etc., holding them in peaceful tenure.

Mindaugas' son Vaišvilkas ruled Novogrudok. Novogrudok was one of Mindaugas' residences. Some identify Novogrudok as Lithuania's first capital, later the Grand Duchy of Lithuania, however, this is refuted by the fact that Voruta is the only contemporary mention of a possible early Lithuanian capital ruled by Mindaugas. Voruta's most likely location has been identified as Šeimyniškėliai mound. The Great Russian Encyclopedia states that Mindaugas' state had no permanent capitals, but his early residence was Black Rus', whose center was Novogrudok. Encyclopædia Britannica mentions only the following Lithuanian capitals: Kernavė, Trakai and Vilnius, excluding Novogrudok from the list.

During the 16th century, three centuries after the events, Maciej Stryjkowski was the first, in his chronicle, to propose the theory that Novogrudok was the capital of the 13th-century state. Vaišvilkas, the son and successor of Mindaugas, took monastic vows in Lavrashev Monastery near Novgorodok and founded an Orthodox convent there. The enmity between Mindaugas and his relatives, who were refuged in Volhynia, led to a great war with the Kingdom of Galicia–Volhynia, which made several major campaigns against the city. These campaigns forced Mindaugas to ally with the Livonian Order. In 1253, Mindaugas was crowned king of Lithuania on behalf of the Pope. Vaišvilkas made peace on behalf of his father with the Kingdom of Galicia–Volhynia and handed over Novogrudok and all Lithuanian cities to Roman Danylovich. After breaking the peace in 1258, Vaišvilkas again became a duke in Novogrudok, and then passed it along with the entire country to Shvarn. The Golden Horde Tatars repeatedly attacked Novogrudok in 1255, 1274, and finally in 1279.

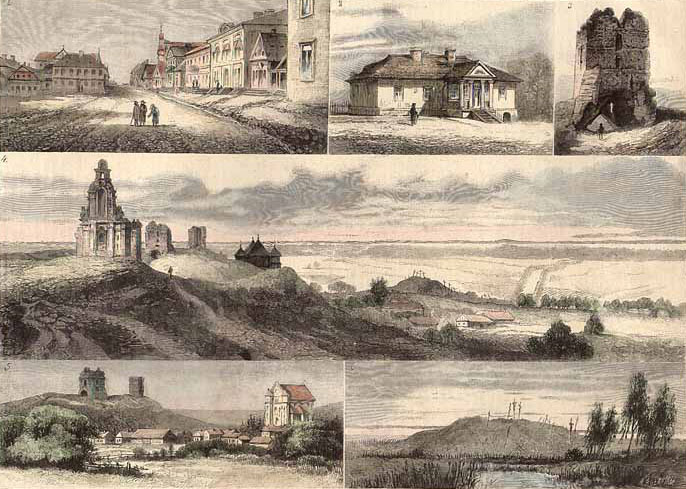
City's landscapes in 19th century.

==== 14th century ====
In 1314, the castle was besieged by the Teutonic Order. It was again attacked by the Teutons in 1321, 1341, 1390 and finally in 1394.

As the centre of the appanage Principality, Novogrudok was owned from 1329 by Prince Karijotas, and then by his son Fyodor from 1358, and from 1386 by Kaributas. At that time, Novogrudok was part of the Trakai Voivodeship, whose population was entirely ethnically Lithuanian, hence Novogrudok was part of Lithuania Proper.

Since 1392, Novogrudok was one of the centres of the Grand Ducal demesne of the Grand Duchy of Lithuania, where the stone Novogrudok Castle was built. The Novogrudok Castle's firmness allowed the existence of a Castellan and a Koniuszy.

==== 15th century ====
At the end of the 14th and start of the 15th century, Vytautas settled the Lipka Tatars in Novogrudok and its surroundings. In 1428, he recorded the city along with the surrounding villages in the lifetime possession of his wife Uliana. In 1415, at the Council of Orthodox bishops in Novogrudok, Gregory Tsamblak was elected Metropolitan of the Grand Duchy of Lithuania. The Synod de facto declared autocephaly of the Orthodox Church in the Grand Duchy of Lithuania, and also reformed internal administration in the Church. In 1422, Vytautas the Great founded the Roman Catholic Transfiguration Church in Novogrudok, in which the wedding of the king of Poland and Grand Duke of Lithuania Jogaila with Sophia of Halshany took place. This marriage gave rise to the Jagiellonian dynasty. Their son Casimir IV Jagiellon granted town rights in 1444. After the Union of Krewo (1385), it was part of the Polish–Lithuanian Union, which became the Polish–Lithuanian Commonwealth after the Union of Lublin in 1569.

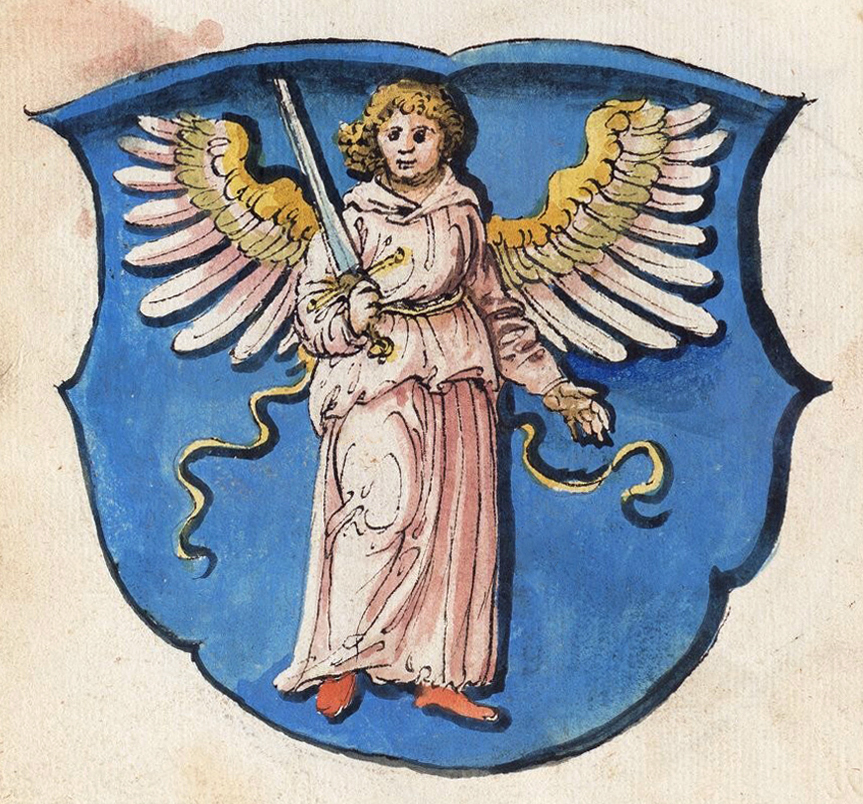
Novogrudok's coat of arms in the 16th century

==== 16th century ====
In 1505, the Tatars tried to capture the city, but failed. Novogrudok was designated as the capital of the Nowogródek Voivodeship from 1507 until the Third Partition of Poland in 1795. On 26 July 1511, the town was granted Magdeburg rights by King Sigismund I the Old, which were reconfirmed in 1562, 1595 and 1776. It was a royal city. In 1568, there were 10 churches in the city. From 1581 to 1775, the city hosted some of the Lithuanian Tribunal's sessions. On 18 March 1595, King Sigismund III Vasa granted the city a coat of arms depicting Saint Michael the Archangel. After the Union of Brest of 1595-1596, the Department of the Orthodox Metropolitanate became a Uniate one. In 1597, Sigismund III Vasa gave the townspeople of Novogrudok the privilege of 2 fairs a year for 2 weeks on the Catholic holidays Epiphany and Pentecost. In the 16th century, Novogrudok was also one of the Reformation's centers. At that time, contemporaries referred to town as—among other things—part of White Ruthenia.

==== 17th century ====
In September 1655, it was captured by Prince A. Trubetskoy's soldiers in the war between the Tsardom of Russia and the Polish–Lithuanian Commonwealth. In 1661, the city was recaptured by the Polish-Lithuanian army, and was exempt from paying taxes for a period of 4 years.

In the 16th–18th centuries, Novogrudok suffered numerous fires (1578, 1599, 1613, 1652, the most severe – in 1751, when 167 houses, 4 churches, the town hall and the Governor's office burned down) and epidemics (1590, 1592, 1603, 1708). In addition, military events and cataclysms of the 17th–18th centuries caused the city's decline.

==== 18th century ====
During the Great Northern War in 1706, the city was occupied by Swedish Army, and later by Muscovite troops, who burned the city and blew up the castle. On 1 May 1751, there was great destruction due to a fire. On 23 September 1784, the king of Poland and Grand Duke of Lithuania Stanisław August Poniatowski arrived in the city. On his way back from Nyasvizh, he visited the city, the Novogrudok Castle's ruins, the tribunal and the city archive. The 6th Lithuanian Infantry Regiment was stationed in the town in 1790. During the War in Defense of the Constitution, in early June 1792, Novogrudok was attacked by the 33,000-strong Tsarist army led by Mikhail Krechetnikov. In mid-June 1792, after the defeat in the battle of Mir, Lithuanian troops under Duke Louis of Württemberg's command retreated through Novogrudok to Grodno. Tatars from General Józef Bielak's Corps were among the last to leave the city. Earlier, they heroically defended the crossing of the Neman river against the Russian soldiers in the Battle of Stolbtsy. At the 18th century's end, there were 6 monasteries, 5 Catholic churches, 3 Orthodox churches, a synagogue, and a Tatar mosque in Novogrudok.

=== In the 19th century ===
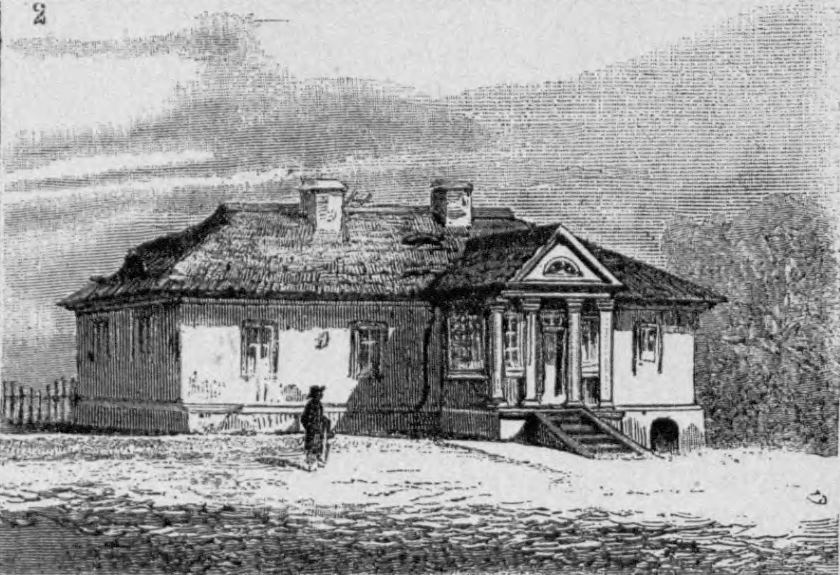
19th century view of Adam Mickiewicz's house

In 1795, as a result of the third Partition of Polish–Lithuanian Commonwealth, it was annexed by Imperial Russia. Administratively, it was part of the Slonim Governorate since 1796, and the Lithuania Governorate since 1801. It was transferred to the Minsk Governorate in 1843. The city is one of two possible birthplaces of the world-renowned poet Adam Mickiewicz. Mickiewicz was baptized in the local Transfiguration Church and spent his childhood in the city.

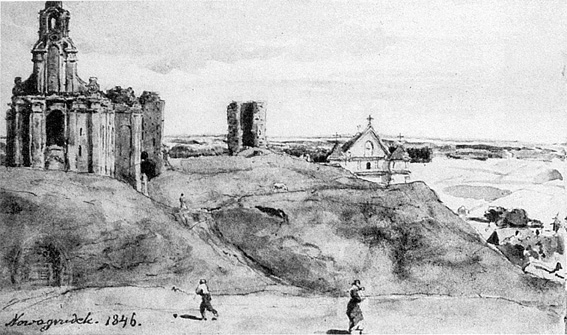
Castle hill by Kanuty Rusiecki, 1846

During the Napoleonic Wars, the Polish 20th Infantry Regiment and 19th Uhlan Regiment were formed from local residents after Novogrudok's occupation by Napoleon's Grande Armée in 1812. In 1817, the city had 428 wooden and 9 stone houses. At that time, mainly Jews, Belarusians, Poles, Lipka Tatars and Russians lived in the city.

==== November Uprising of 1831 ====
During the November Uprising, on 22 July 1831, Novogrudok was occupied for some time by the detachments of Y. Kashits and M. Mezheyevsky.

After the liquidation of the Dominican school in 1834, the tsarist authorities opened a five-class school, which turned into the Novogrudok gymnasium in 1858. In 1837, Novogrudok had 4 unpaved and 9 paved streets and alleys.

==== January Uprising of 1863 and subsequent repressions ====
During the January Uprising, an insurgent organization led by V. Borzobogaty was formed in the city. In 1863, priest Felician Lashkevich from Novogrudok partook in this uprising. As part of anti-Catholic repression following the January Uprising, the tsarist administration closed down the gymnasium as well as Catholic churches, which were transformed into Orthodox churches.

In 1896, Rabbi Yosef Yozel Horwitz founded one of the most famous Jewish higher educational religious institutions in Novogrudok, the Novardok Yeshiva, which was one of the largest and most important yeshivas in pre-war Europe and a powerful force in the Musar movement.

=== In the 20th century ===
In 1905, the first gas street lamps appeared in Novogrudok. In 1910, there were 76 stone and 1074 wooden buildings in the city, and in 1914 there were 6 educational institutions in the city. In 1907-1909, a provincial branch of the Polish society "Enlightenment" worked in the city, which supported Polish education. It had a thriving Jewish community. In 1897, its Jewish population was 5,015, and in 1931 it was 6,309.

Old views of Navahrudak

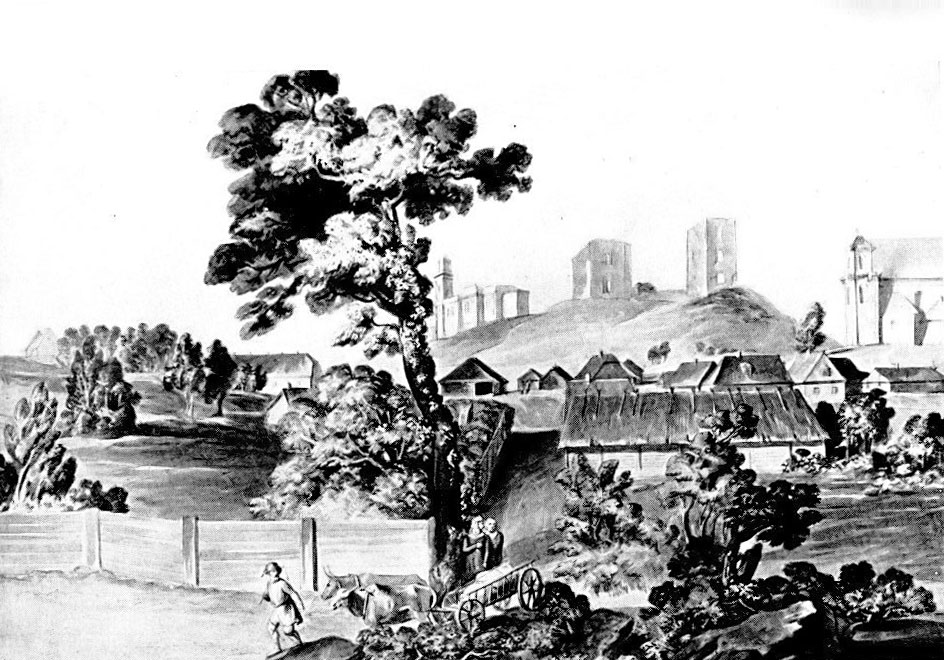
Panorama. Józef Peszka, about 1800.

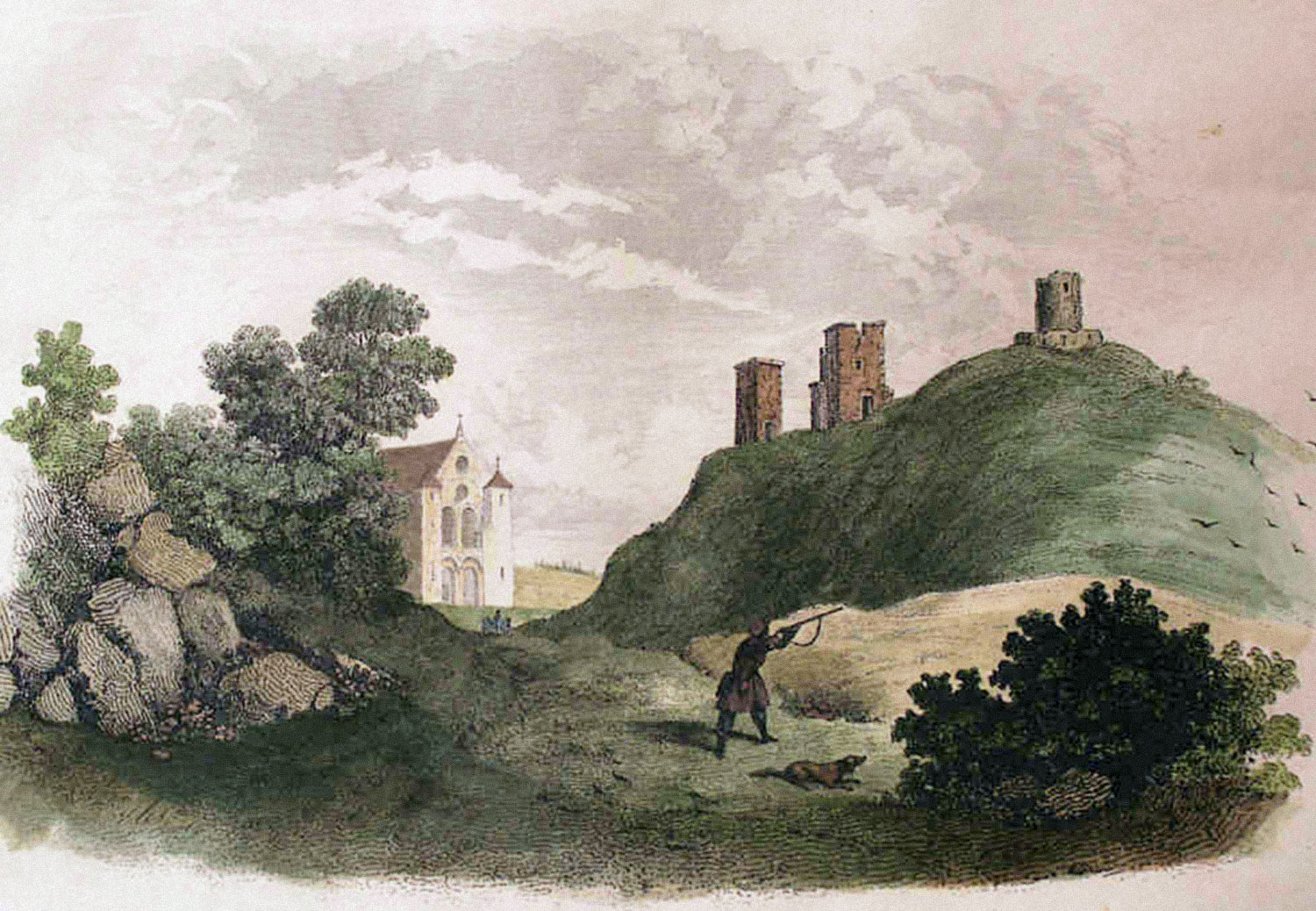
Castle mountain. A. Ales, 1835.

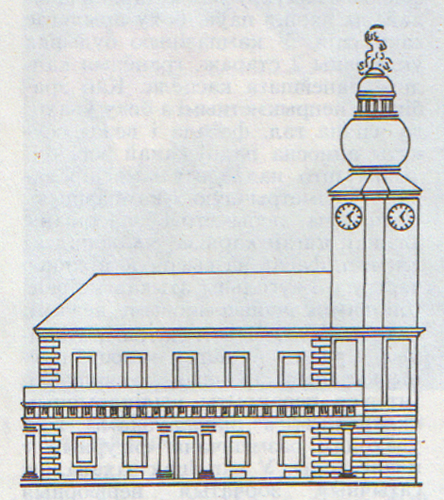
Navahrudak town hall, plan in the 19th century.

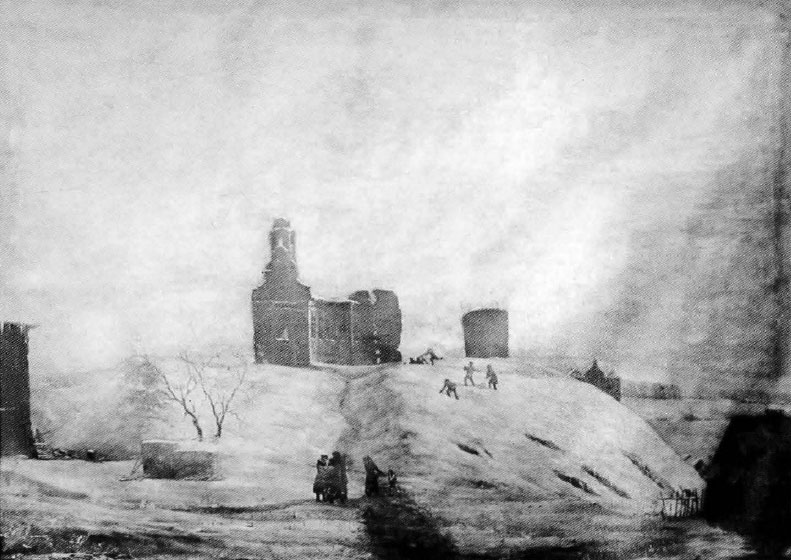
Castle Church before demolition by the tsarist authorities.

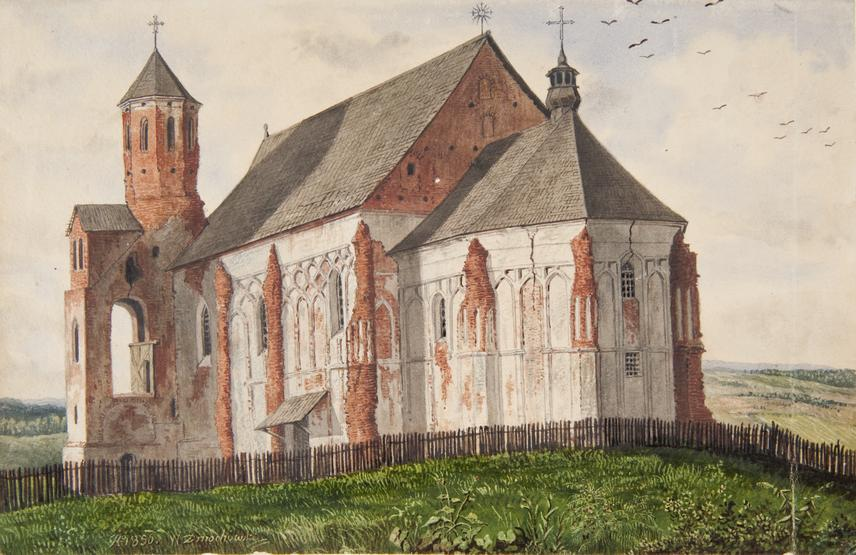
Church of Boris and Gleb, Chair of the Lithuanian Orthodox Archdiocese Vincent Dmachoŭski, 1856.

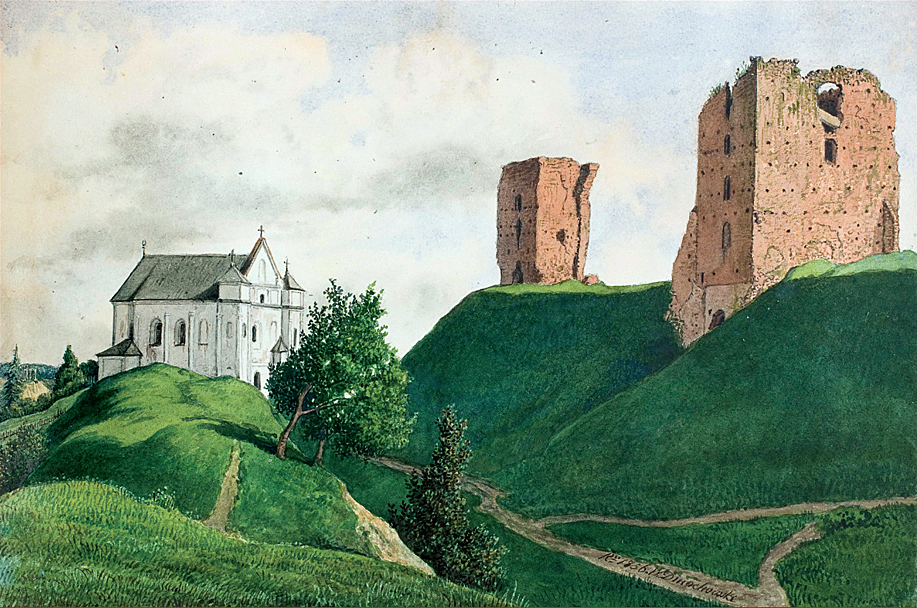
Transfiguration Church and Navahrudak Castle. Vincent Dmachoŭski, 1856.

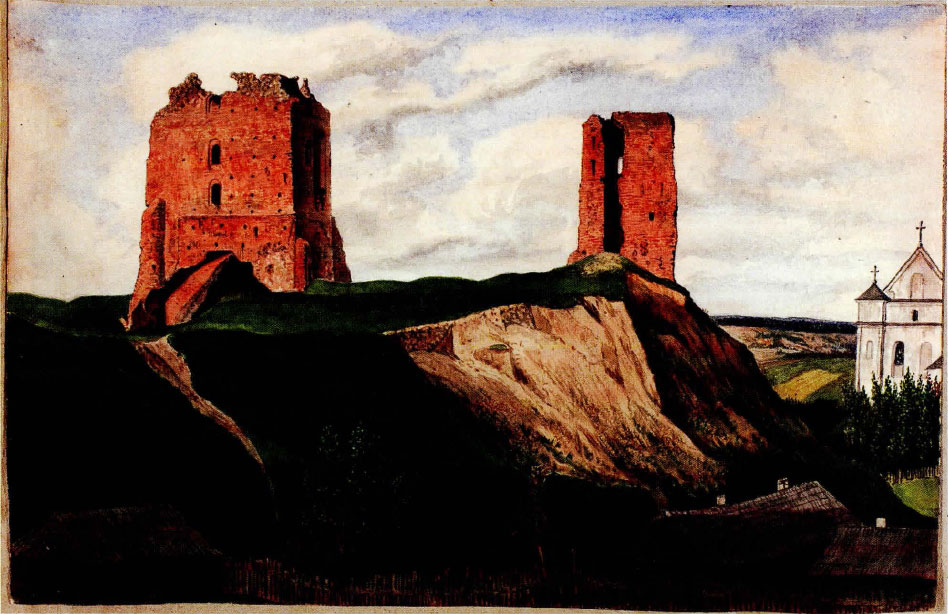
Castle. Vincent Dmachoŭski, 1856.

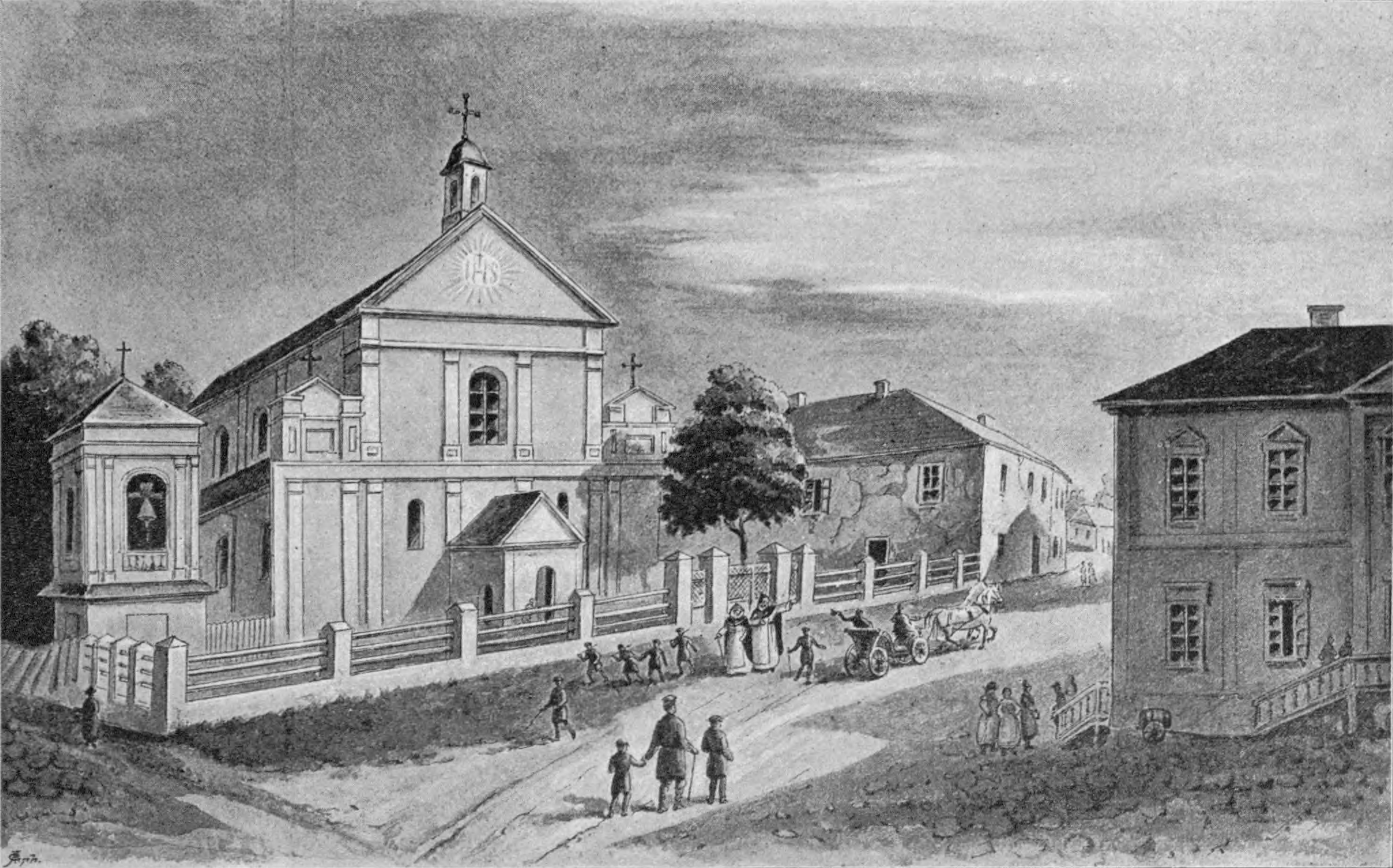
The corner of the Market square and the streets of Slonim. Church of the Dominicans.

==== World War I and Polish–Soviet War ====
During the First World War, the city was under German occupation from 22 September 1915 to 27 December 1918. On 22 September 1915, Novogrudok was occupied by the German 10th Army. The Russian-German front was now only 20 km East of the city, along the Servechi river. The Germans built a power plant, a network of narrow-gauge railways, and telephone lines. The creation of Polish and Belarusian schools was also allowed in the city.

Mickiewicz's house was occupied by General of Infantry Reinhard von Scheffer-Boyadel, the XVII Reserve Corps' commander. Due to the front's proximity, Marshal Paul von Hindenburg came to Novogrudok. During German rule, on 25 March 1918, Novogrudok was declared part of the Belarusian People's Republic. On 27 December 1918, the German army's cavalry left Novogrudok. In the evening, the Bolsheviks entered the city, greeted with an ovation by the Jewish and Russian population. Soon, some Polish activists were arrested, and in March 1919, the Bolsheviks executed some of them in the castle ruins.

On 1 January 1919, following the resolution and Congress of the CP(b) of Belarus, it became a part of the Belarusian SSR. On 25 May 1919, the Novogrudok Belarusian gymnasium was opened here.

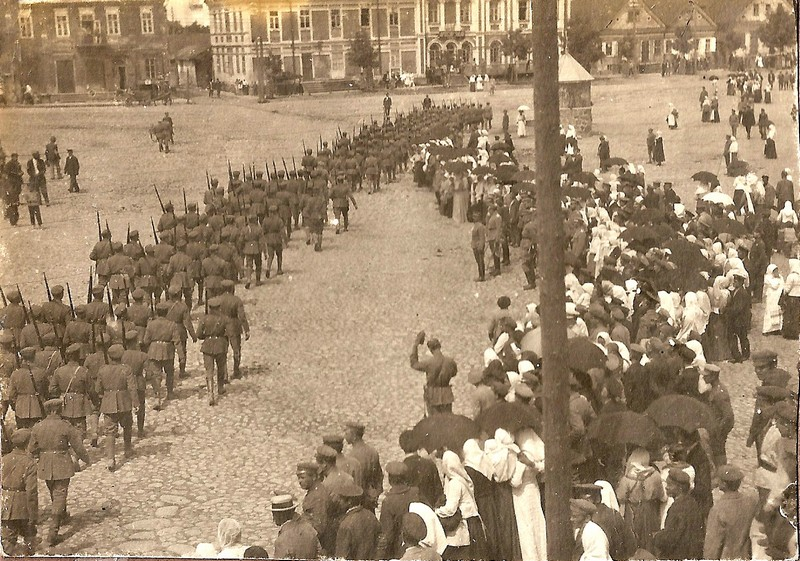
Cavalry squadron of the 10th Lithuanian Uhlan regiment in Novogrudok 1919.

During the Polish–Soviet War, Novogrudok changed hands several times. From mid-March 1919, Polish Army detachments began to appear in Novogrudok's vicinity. On 8 April 1919, at dawn, after several hours of fighting, soldiers of the 2nd Kaunas Rifle Regiment of Major Leon Zawistowski and two squadrons of the 10th Lithuanian Uhlan Regiment captured the city. Many Communist Poles from the Western Rifle Division fought in the battles on the Red Army's side. With the city's capture, the Polish Army received large warehouses of military weaponry and ammunition, while also capturing about 300 prisoners of war. The Polish-Bolshevik front stopped for several months along the line of former German trenches on the rivers Servech and Uschi.

On the morning of 19 July 1920, the Red Army again occupied Novogrudok. After crushing defeats in the Battle of Warsaw and later of the Niemen River, on 1 October 1920, Polish troops again occupied the city. These were detachments of the 1st and 5th Legions' Infantry Regiments, the 16th Infantry Regiment, and 3 batteries of the 1st Legionary Artillery Regiment. Most of them belonged to the 1st Legions Infantry Division.

==== In Second Polish Republic ====
Ultimately captured by the Poles in October 1920, it was confirmed as part of the Second Polish Republic by the Peace of Riga. The civil authorities, headed by the headman Joseph Yellin, began to act on 3 November. The traditions of the Lithuanian Tribunal were partially revived by the Novogrudok Voivodeship court, which opened on 11 January 1921, in the building of the former Russian County school.

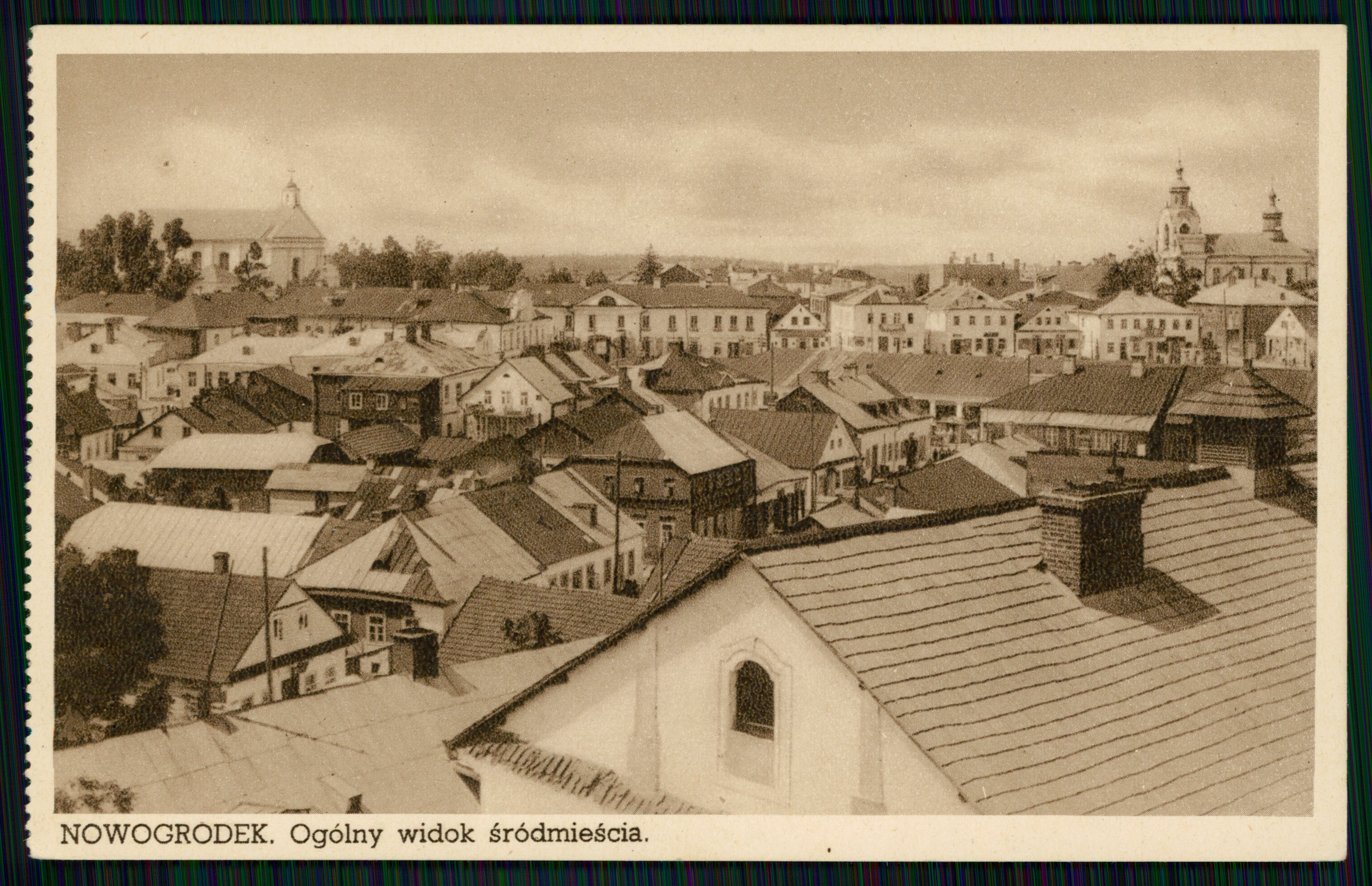
Novogrudok in interwar Poland

During the interwar period, Novogrudok served as the seat of the Novogrudok Voivodeship until the 1939 invasion of Poland by Germany and the Soviet Union. Many new buildings were built, including the voivodeship office, district court, tax office, theatre, power plant, city bath and a narrow-gauge railway station. In 1938, a museum was created in the former home of Adam Mickiewicz. The first voivode of Novogrudok (1921-1924) was Władysław Raczkiewicz, later (1939-1947) President of Poland in exile. On 13 May 1922, Adam Mickiewicz's eldest son, Wladyslaw, came to Novogrudok to stay, and on 30 October 1922, the chief of state, Marshal Józef Piłsudski, came here. In the following years, the former power station was converted into a city theatre. Several other Polish presidents visited the city: Stanisław Wojciechowski (25-27 May 1924) and Ignacy Mościcki (September 1929 and the end of June 1931). In the 1920s and 1930s, more than 10 titles of periodicals were published in the city. In October 1922, the first Belarusian-language newspaper "Nasha Batskayshchyna" was published in Novogrudok. In 1924-1931, a mound was built on the small castle in honour of Adam Mickiewicz, and a Museum was opened in his honour on 11 September 1938. As of 1931, there were 1055 residential buildings in the city, 2 catholic churches, 2 orthodox churches, 3 synagogues, and a mosque; in addition to the Belarusian one, there was a polish gymnasium. In addition, there were 2 hospitals, 7 hotels, and 2 printing houses.

City in old photos:

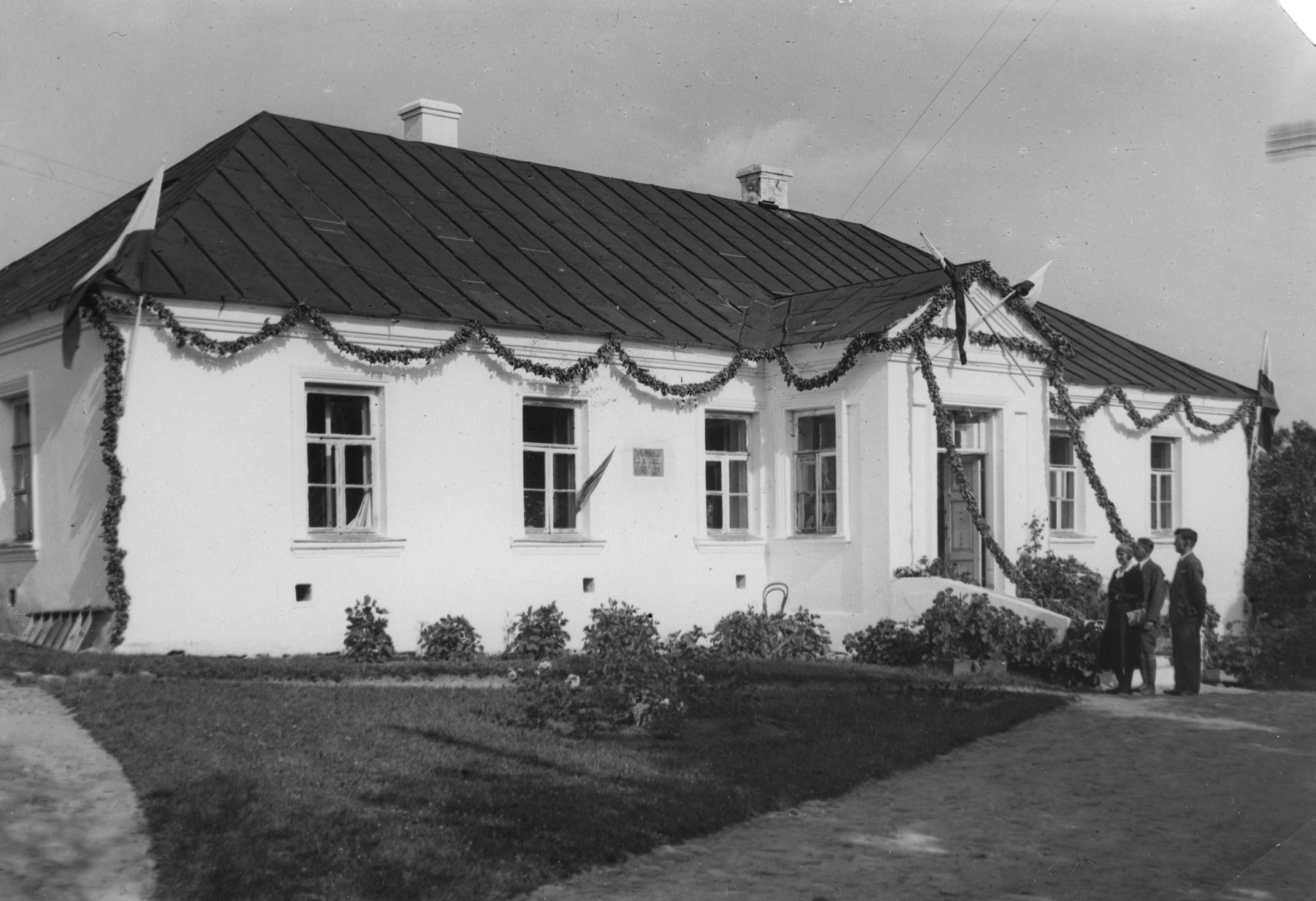
The House Of Adam Mickiewicz

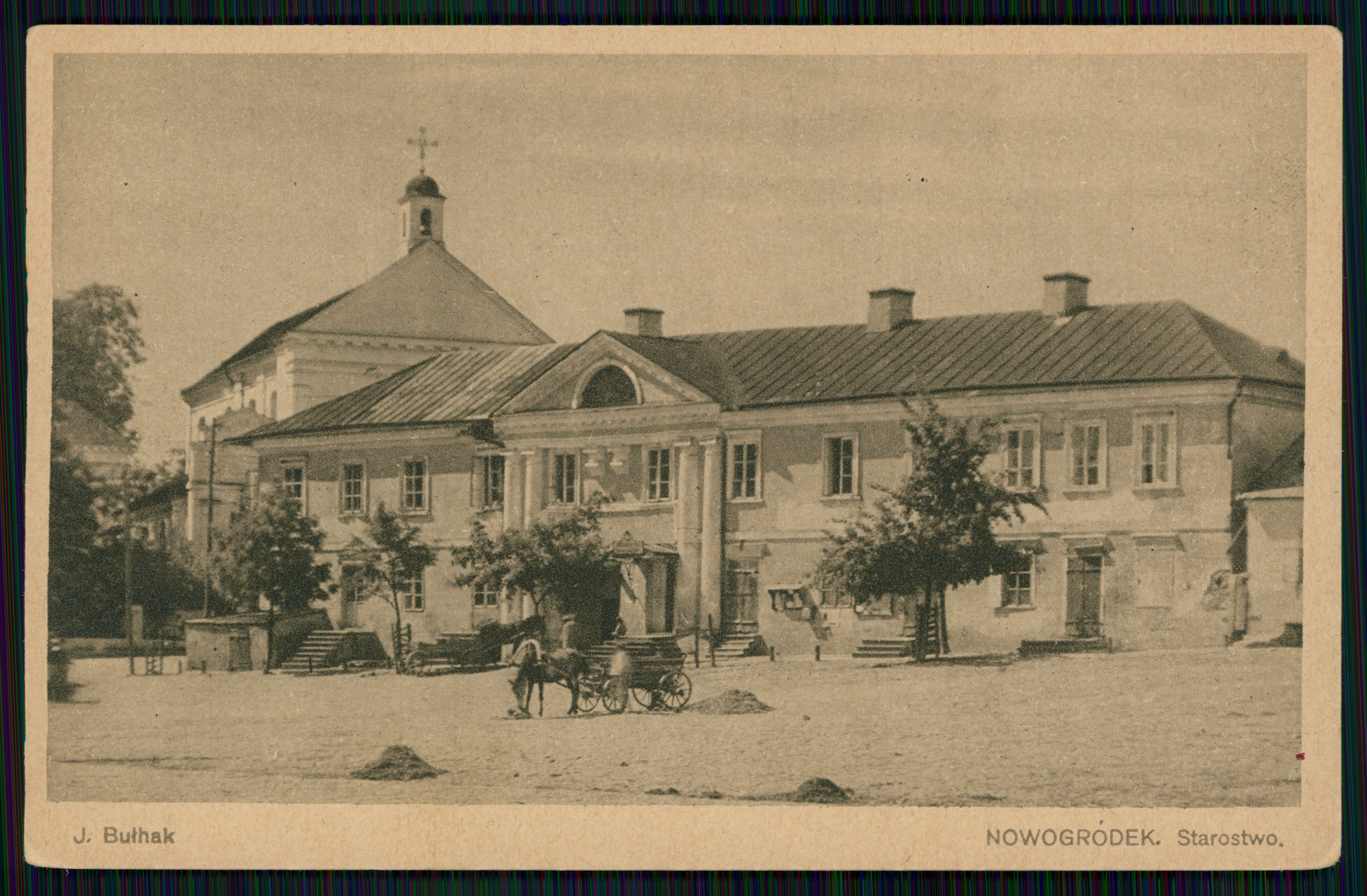
Eldership (the former Palace of the Radziwills)

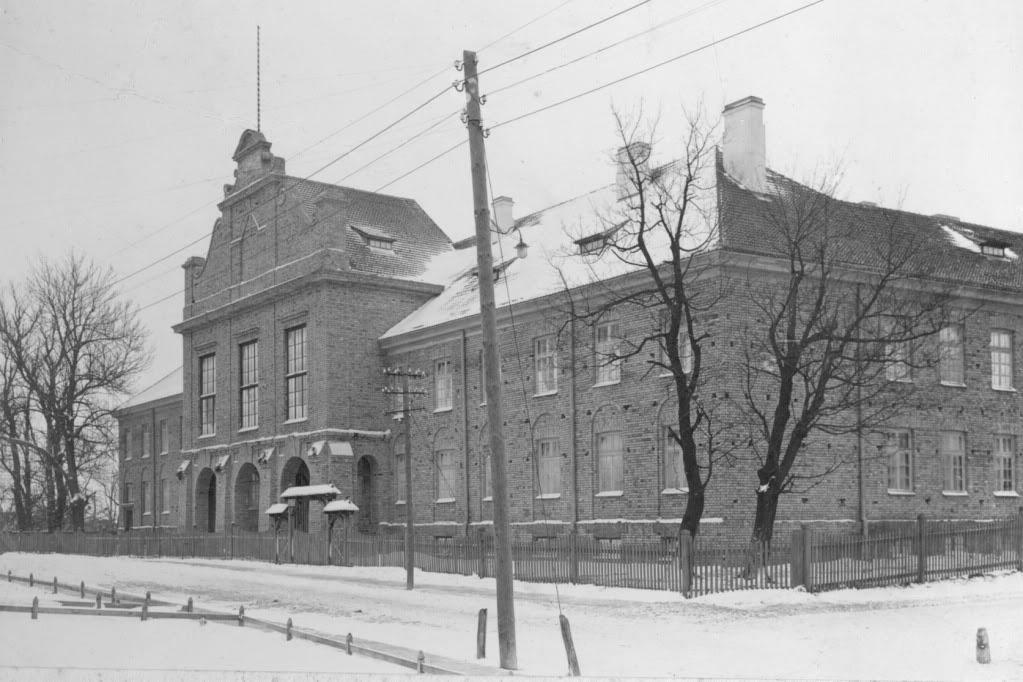
The office of the Governor

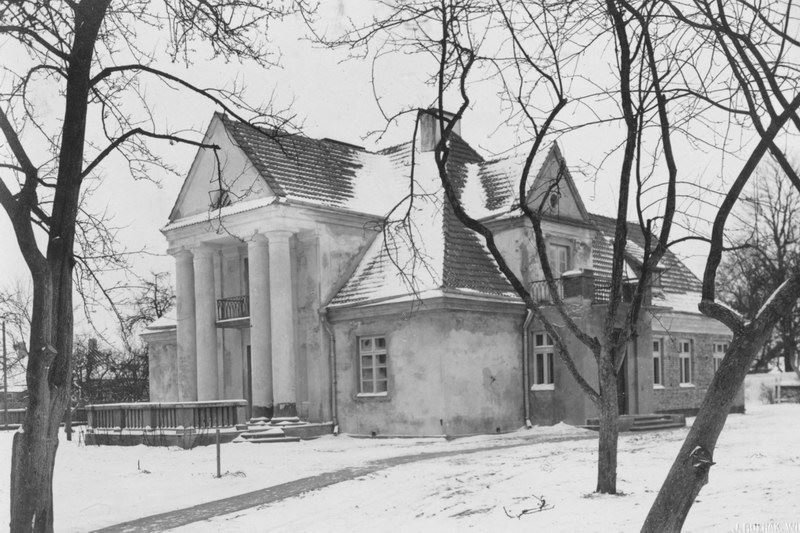
The house of the Governor

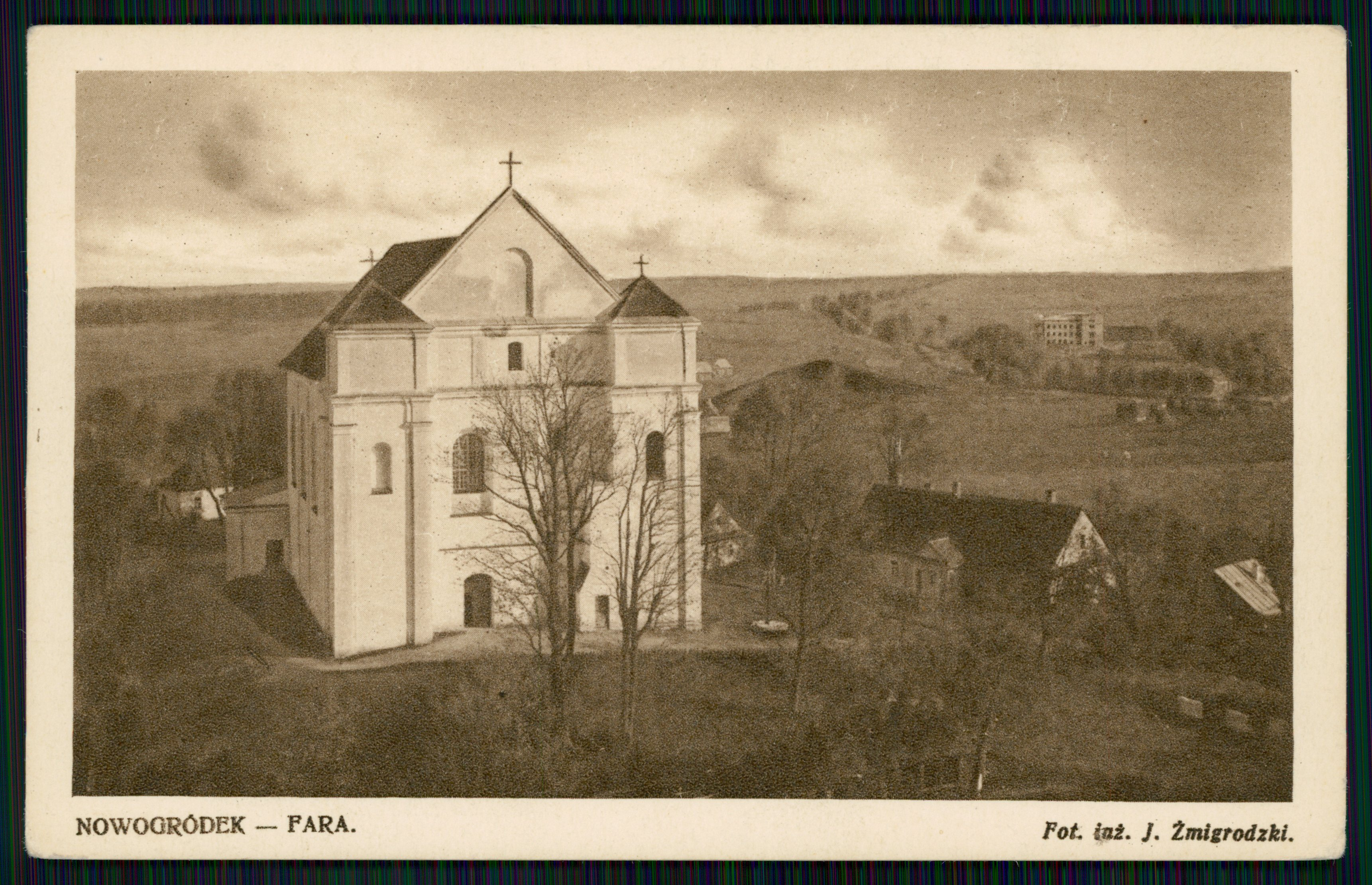
Transfiguration Church

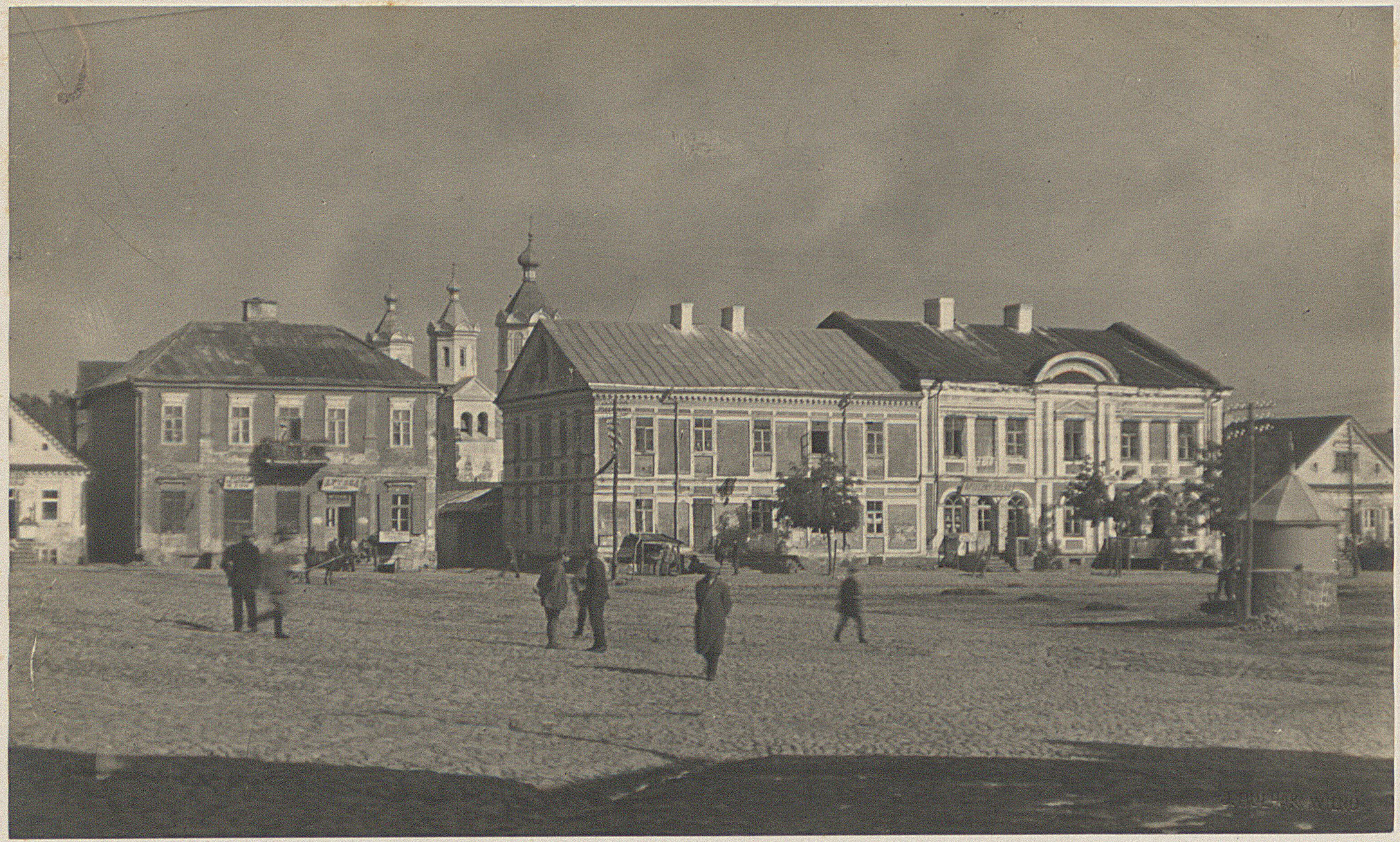
Market square

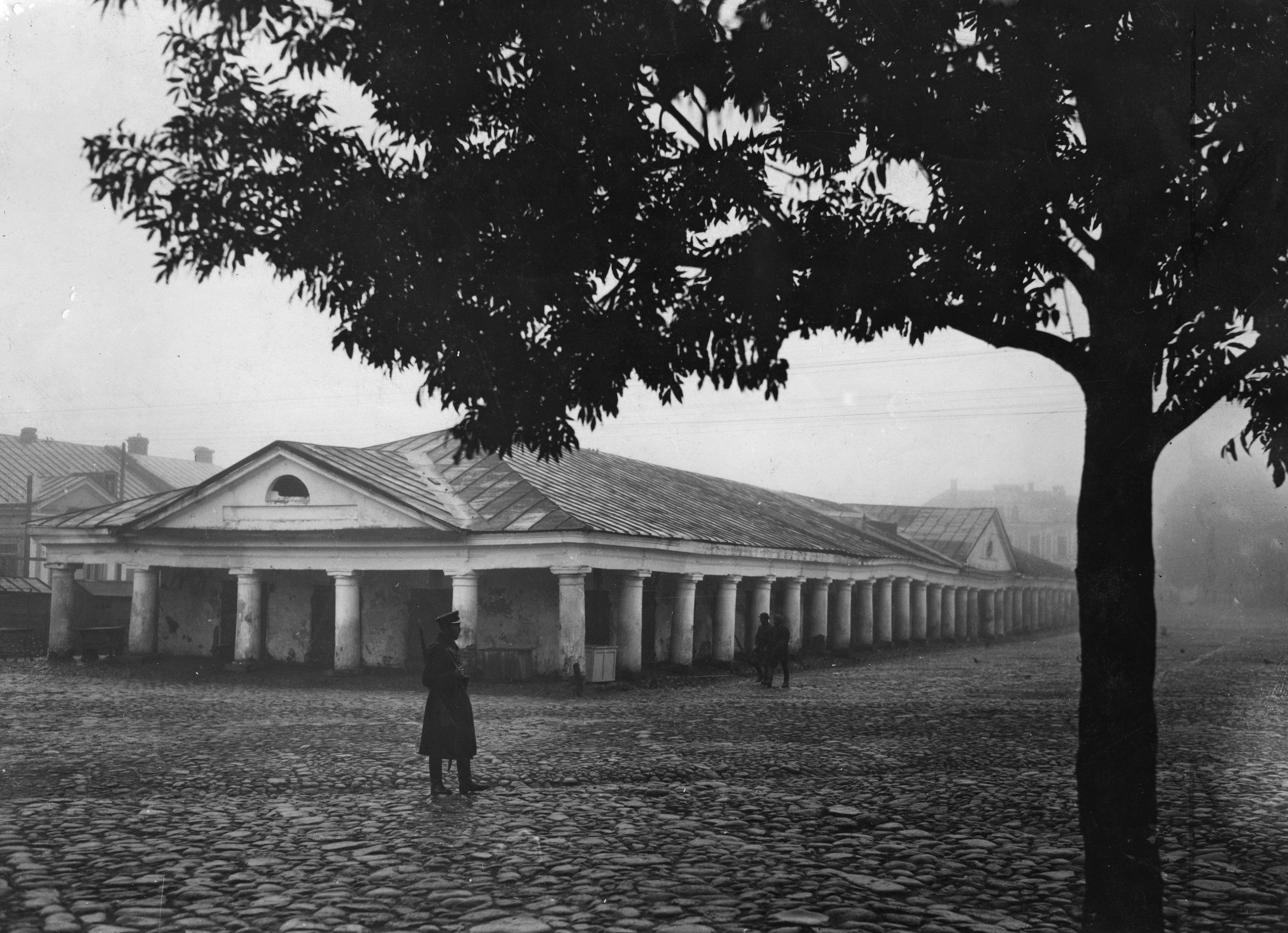
Shopping malls

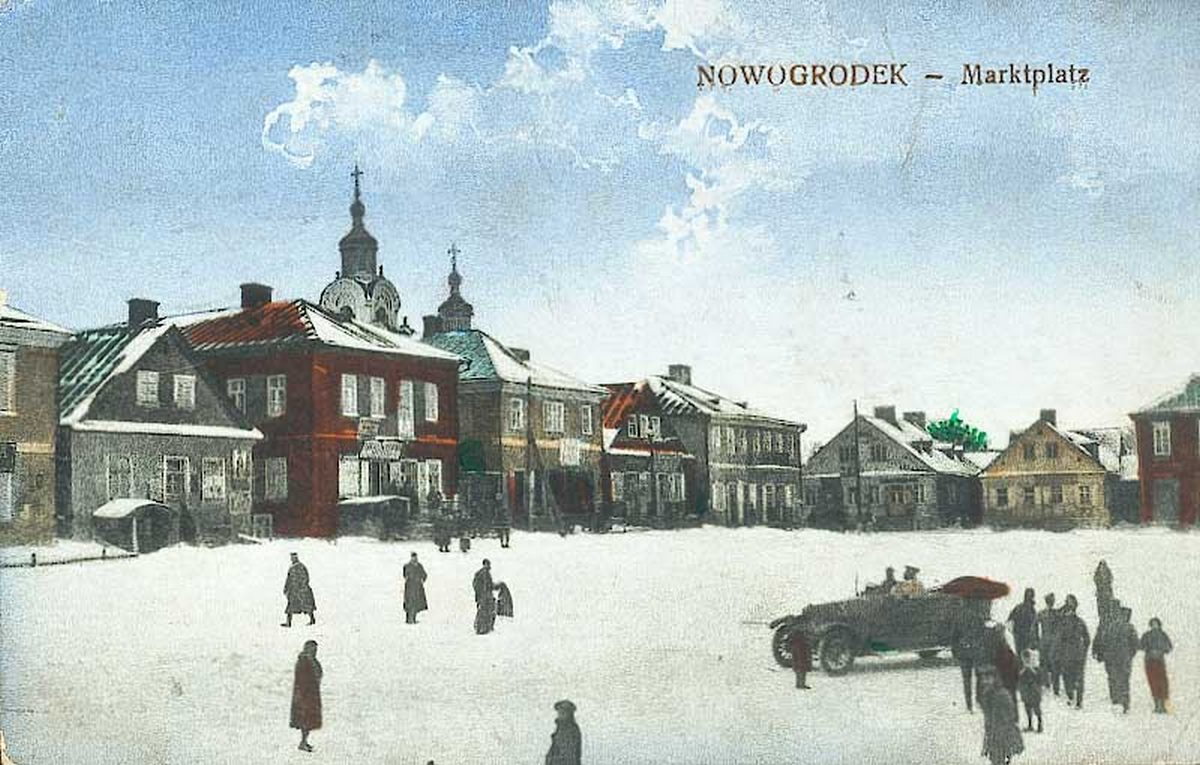
Former Market square 1917

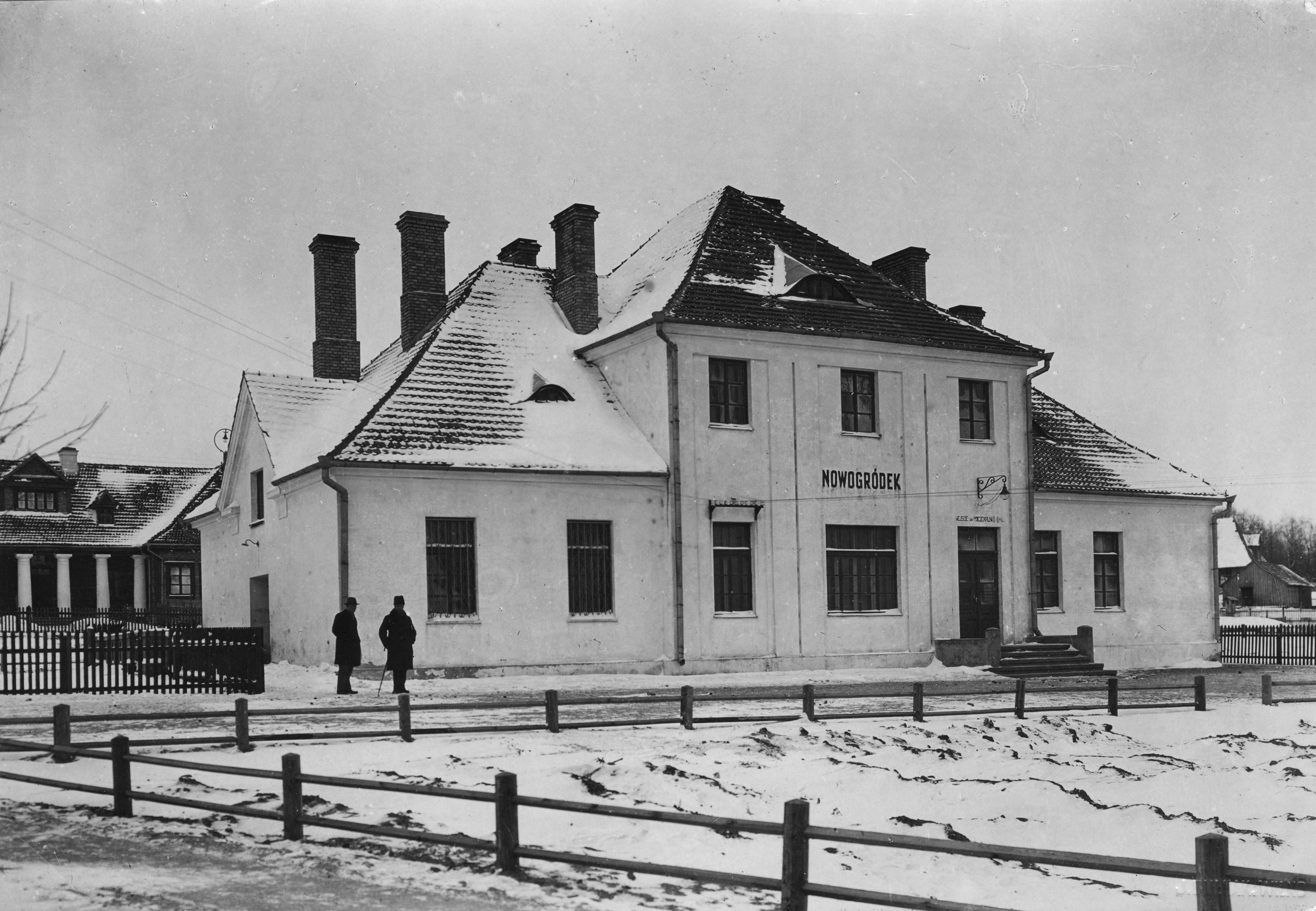
Train station

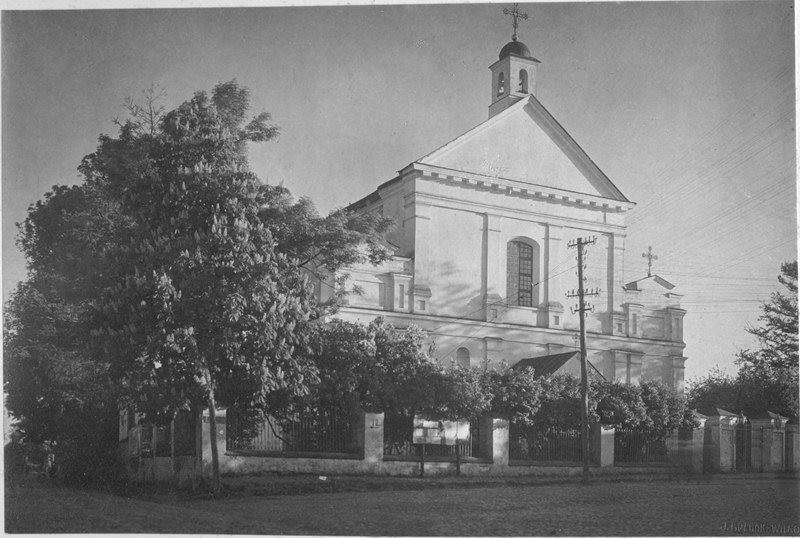
Church in honor of the Archangel Michael

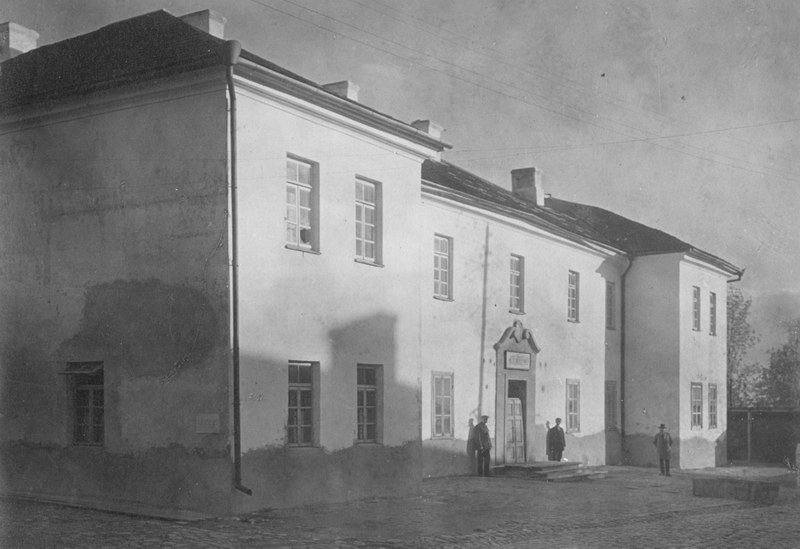
Former Dominican monastery

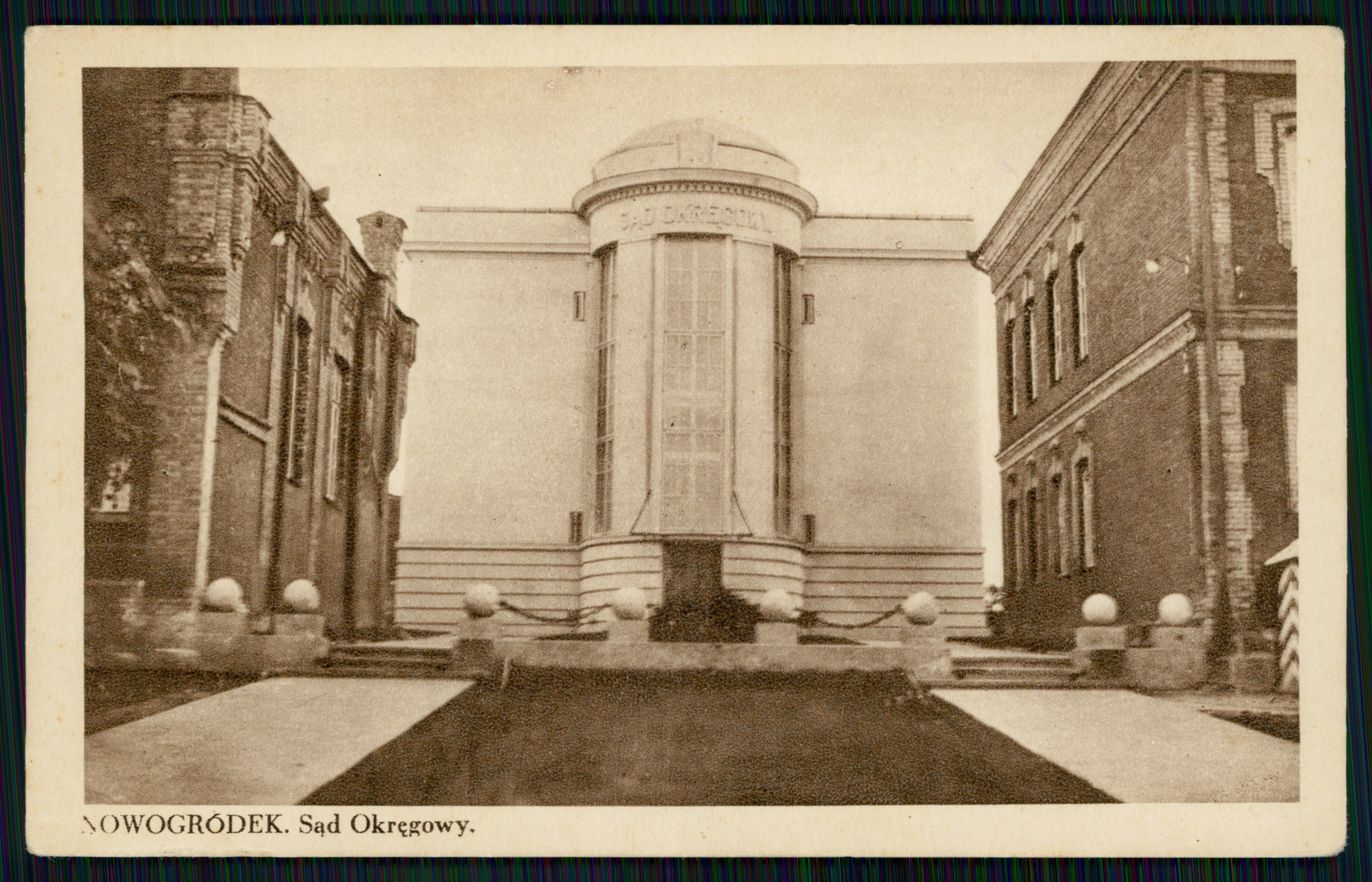
District court

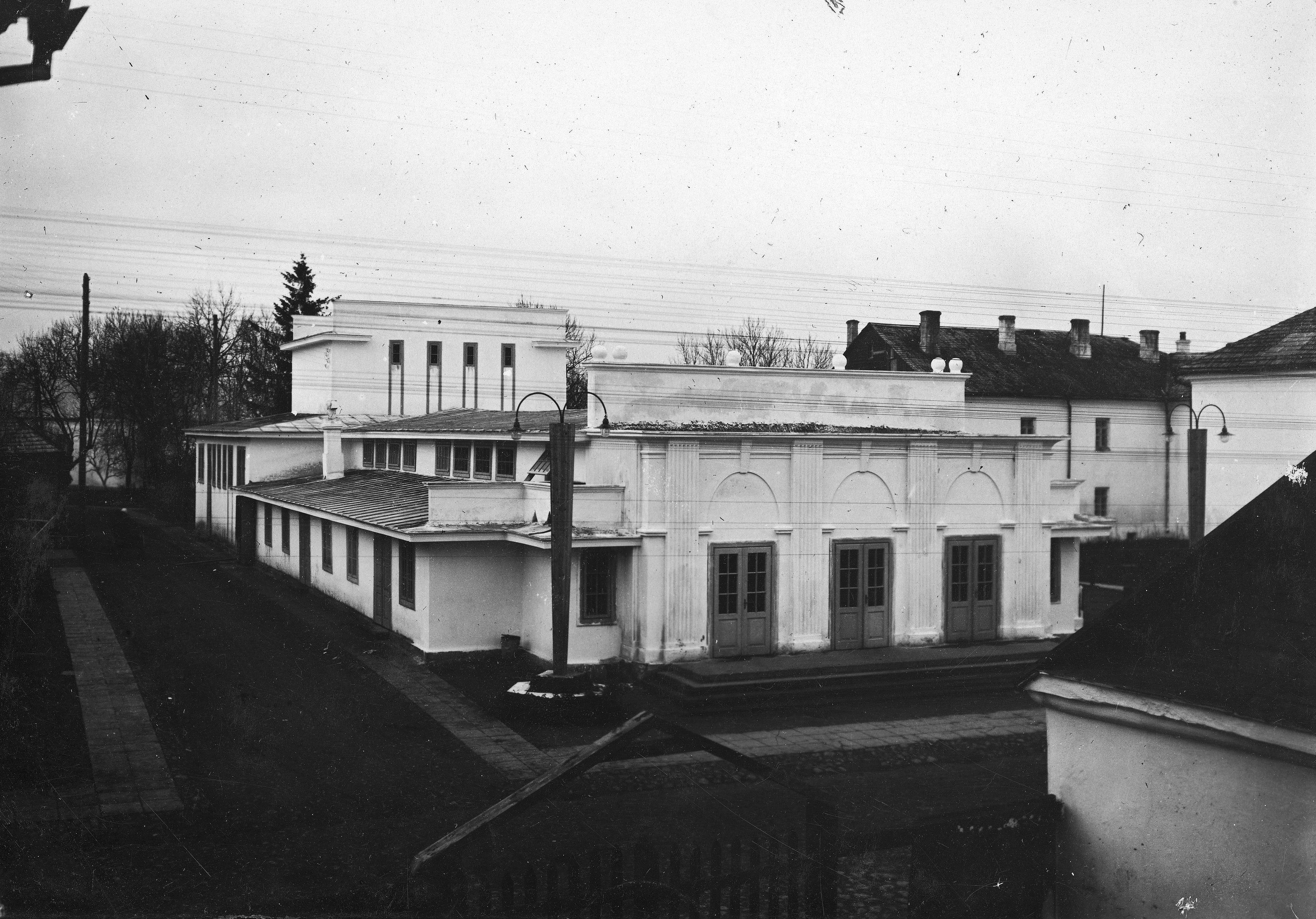
A former power station building converted into a theater and cinema

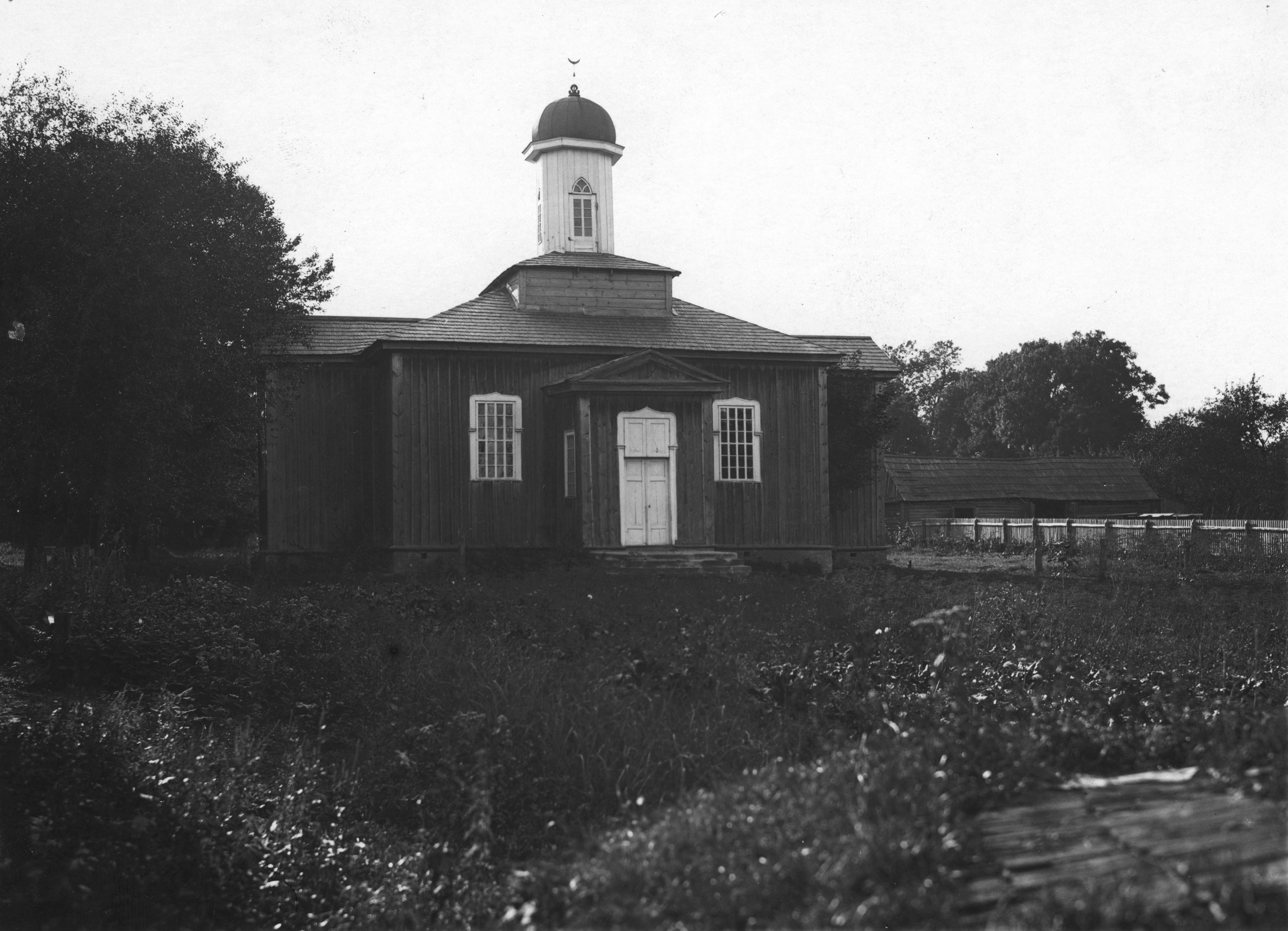
Navahrudak Mosque

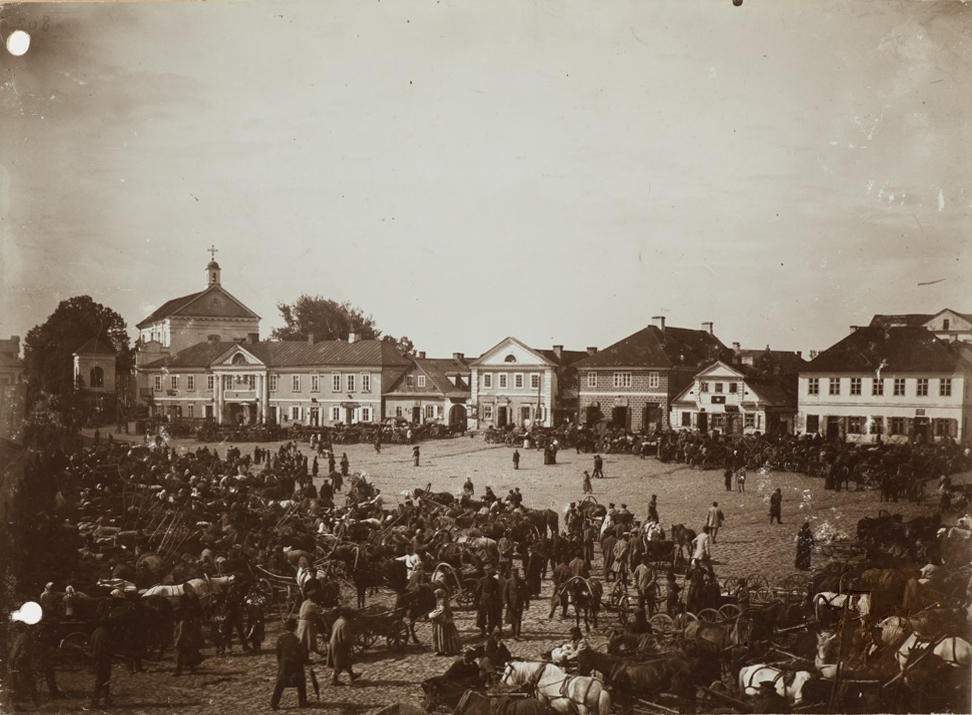
Market square

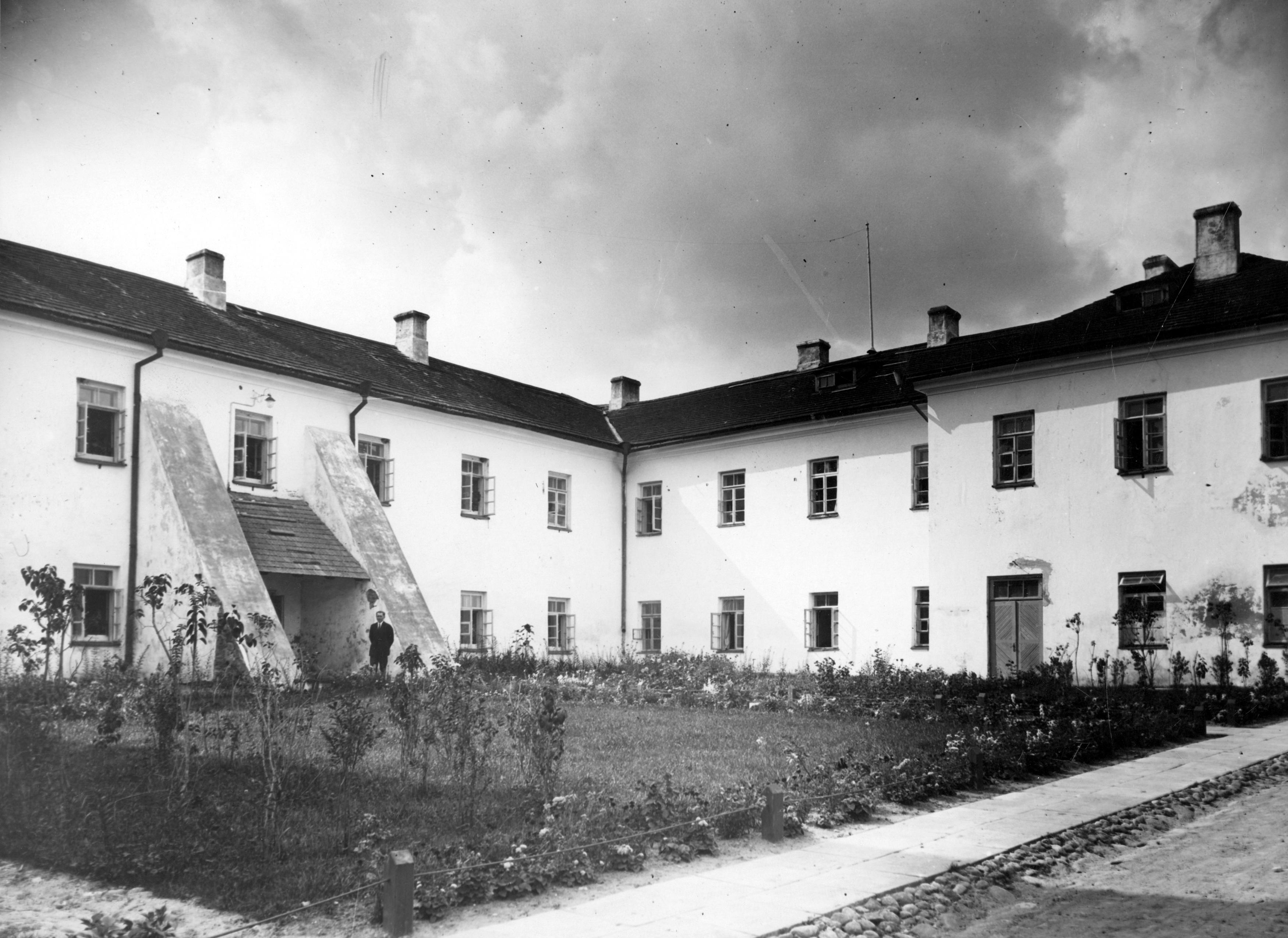
Dominican women's monastery, 1929

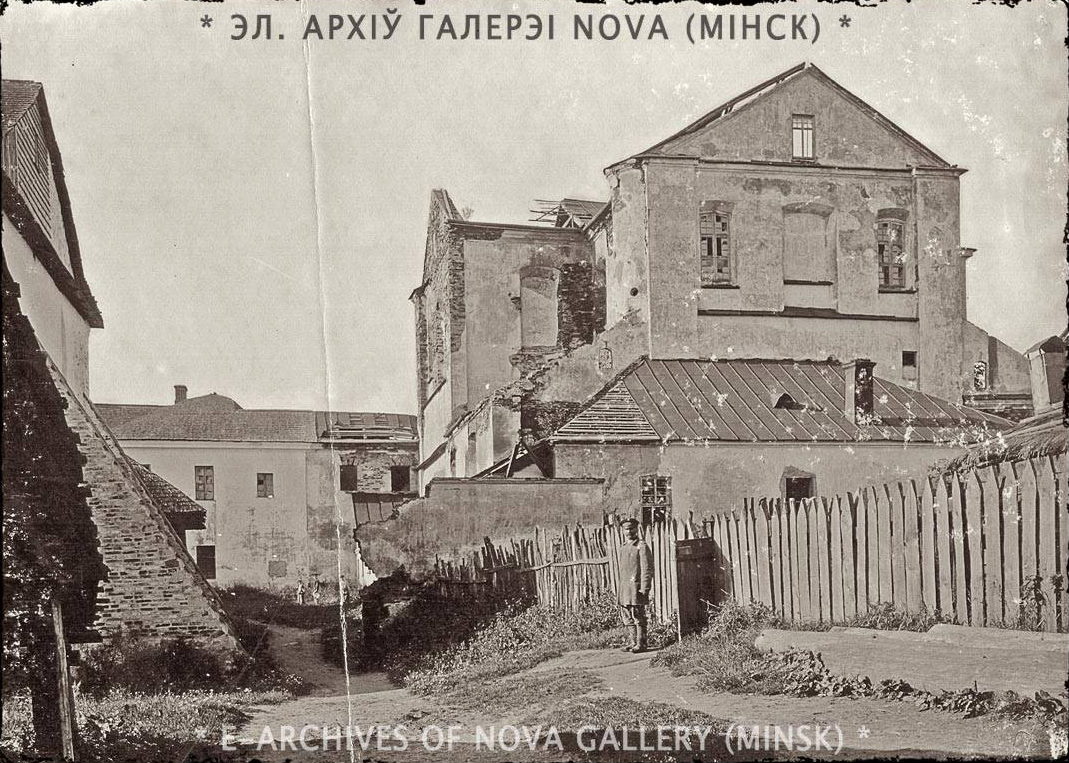
The Church of the Dominicans during the destruction by the tsarist authorities

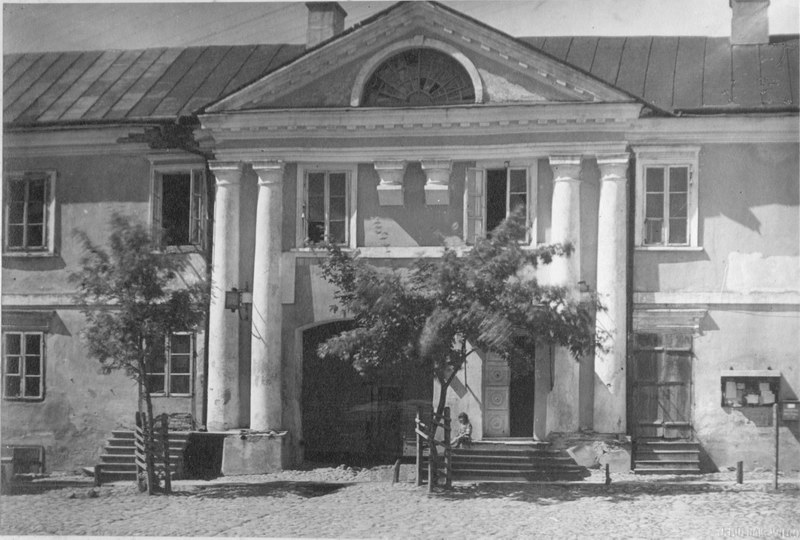
The Radziwiłł Palace. Snapshot Jan Bułhak, 1926

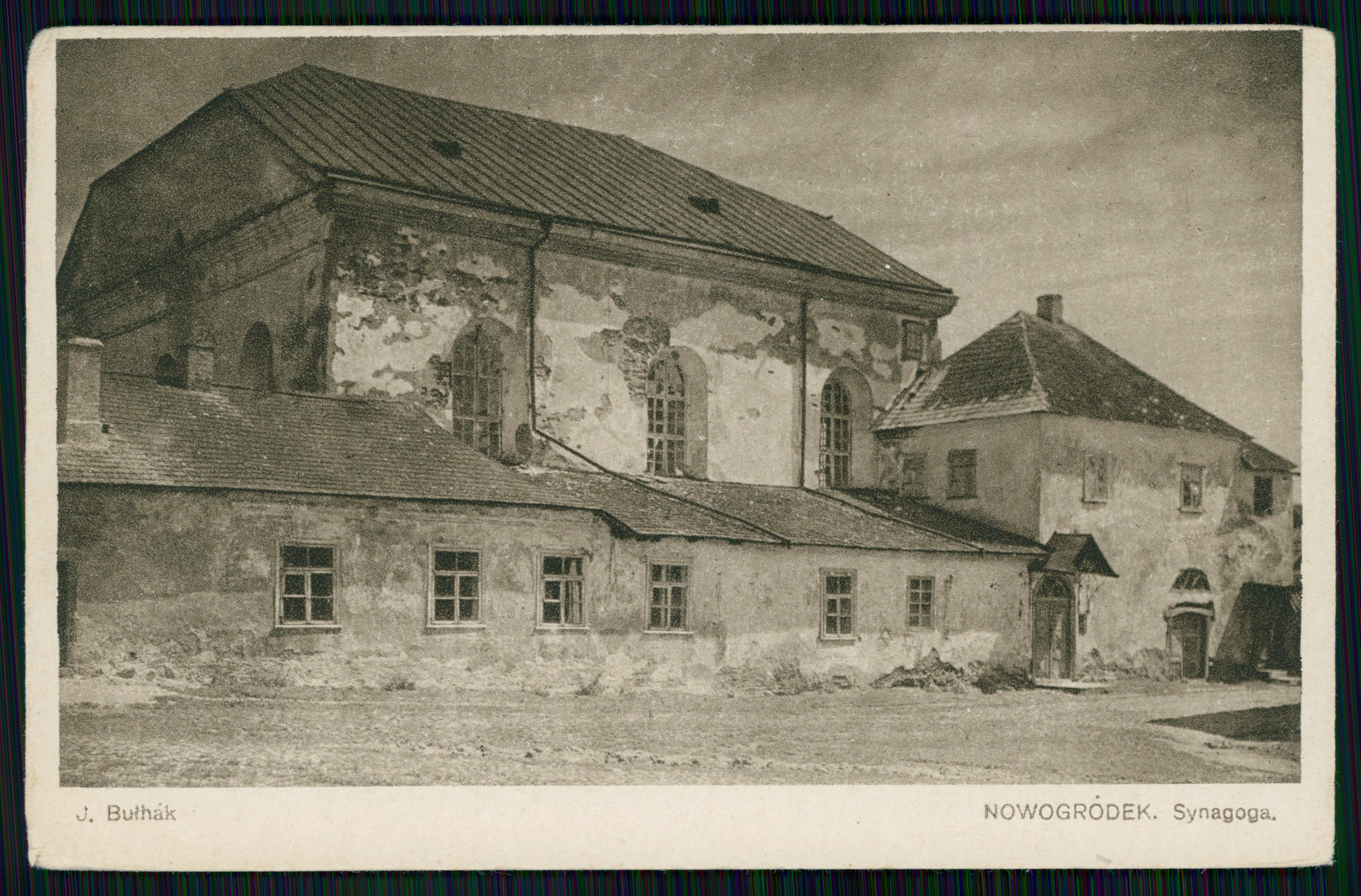
Great synagogue. Snapshot Jan Bułhak, c. 1930

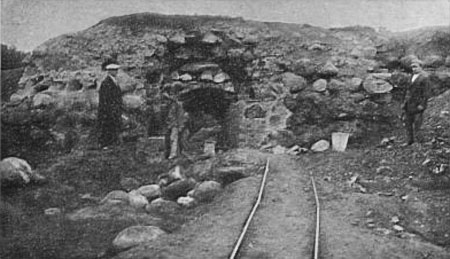
Ruins of a Small gate, a castle

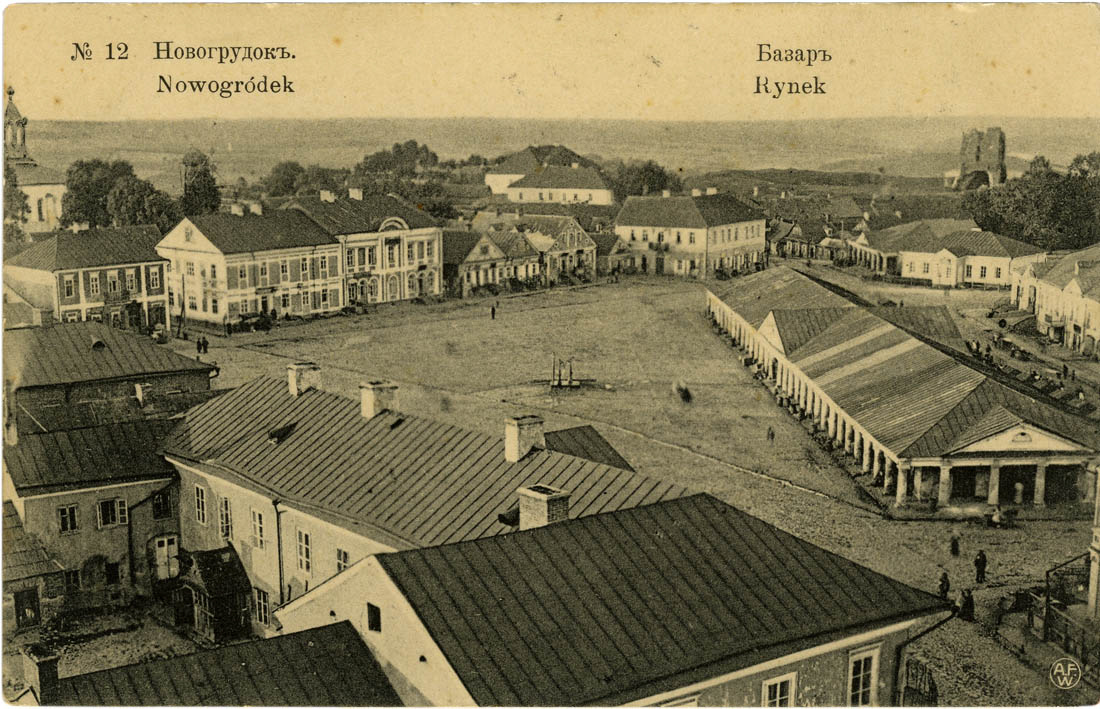
Market square on the side of the Radziwill Palace

==== World War II ====
===== Soviet occupation =====
At the beginning of World War II, after 17 September 1939, Soviet Air Forces' bombers began dropping leaflets written in broken Polish over the city, announcing the imminent liberation "from the yoke of the lords" and other oppressors. On 18 September 1939 Novogrudok was occupied by the Red Army and, on 14 November 1939, incorporated into the Byelorussian SSR. Many residents of the city and region were repressed and exiled to other regions of the USSR, and the region was subjected to severe Sovietization. In the administrative division of the new territories, the city was briefly the centre of Navahrudak Region until it moved to Baranavichy, and region itself was renamed to Baranavichy Region and to the Novogrudok Raion (15 January 1940).

===== German occupation =====
On 22 June 1941, the city was subjected to German bombing, the former Starostvo, formerly the Radziwill Palace, and shopping malls were destroyed as Germany invaded the Soviet Union. On 4 July, Novogrudok was occupied by the Wehrmacht. Then, the Red Army was surrounded in the Novogrudok Cauldron. Nevertheless, during the German occupation, there was active resistance to the Nazis.

In mid-December 1943, the Polish resistance separated the Novogrudok district of the Home Army from the Bialystok district. The headquarters of the Home Army's district was in Lida. The Nazis killed more than 10,000 Jews in the Novogrudok Ghetto, Novogrudok and nearby villages during the Holocaust. However, in mid-may 1943, the last remaining ghetto prisoners began to dig a 250-metre (820 ft) underground passage outside the ghetto, and five months later, on 26 September 1943, an escape was made through it. A total of 232 people escaped through the tunnel. Some of the fleeing Jews joined the Bielski partisans, which actively fought against the Nazis in the region.

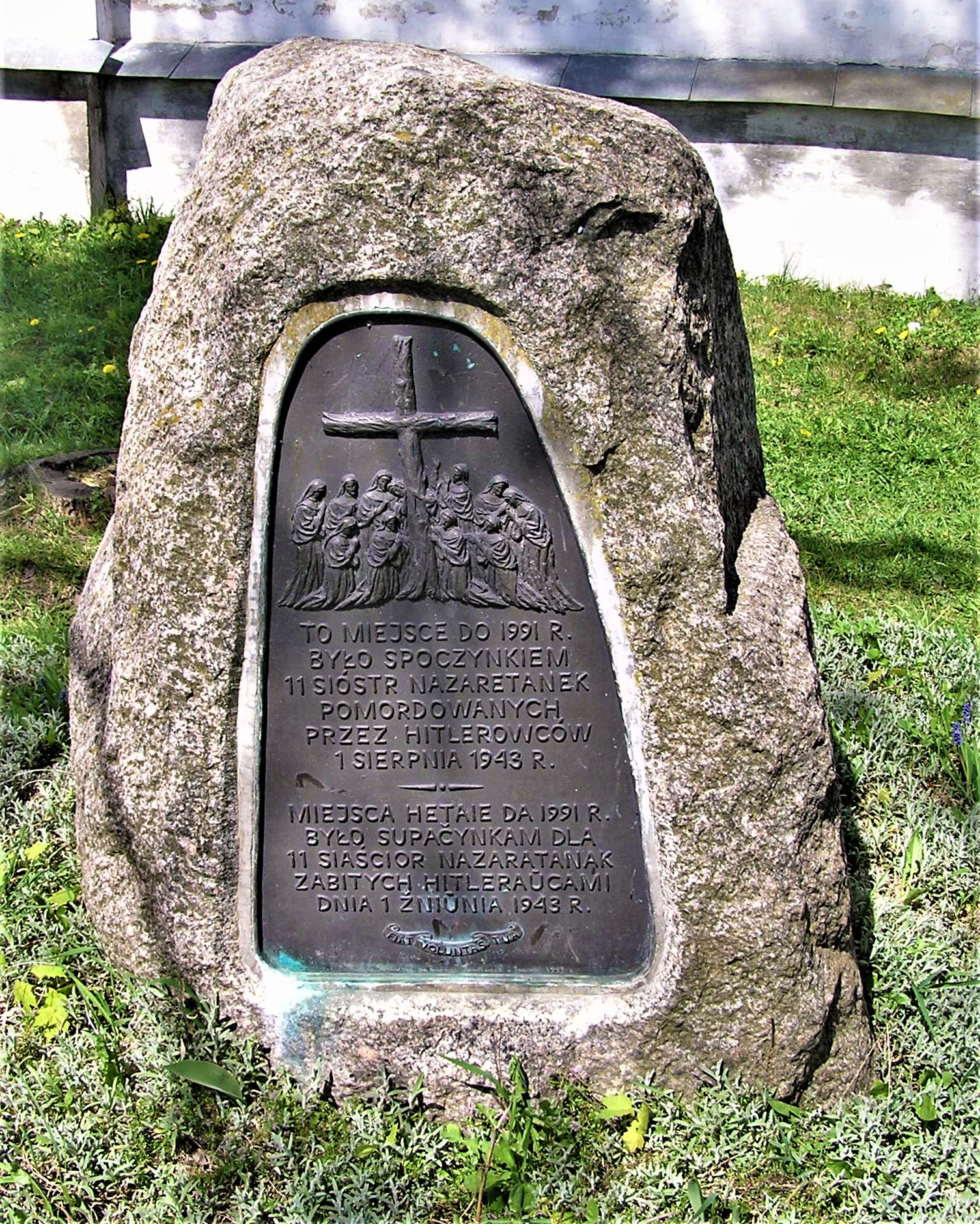
Memorial stone to the Martyrs of Nowogródek

During the German occupation, the city served as the administrative centre of Kreisgebiet Nowogrodek within the Generalbezirk Weißruthenien of Reichskommissariat Ostland. The local population was subjected to deportations for forced labour to Germany and executions. In February–March 1944, by order of the Gebietskommissar (Area Commissioner) of the Novogrudok district, SS-Obersturmbannführer Wilhelm Traub, former Lieutenant of the Polish army Barys Rahula formed the Belarusian Novogrudok mounted squadron to fight the partisans. In February 1944, the 65th Belarusian Schutzmannschaft Battalion was formed in Novogrudok. However, in early July 1944, Barys Rahula curtailed the activities of the squadron.

During the German occupation in Novogrudok, the Sisters of the Holy Family of Nazareth organized, at the request of the parents of Polish children, underground teaching in the Polish language and history. On 1 August 1943, the underground school ceased to exist after 11 nuns, the Martyrs of Nowogródek, including the main organizer of the school, were shot by the German occupiers on 1 August 1943.

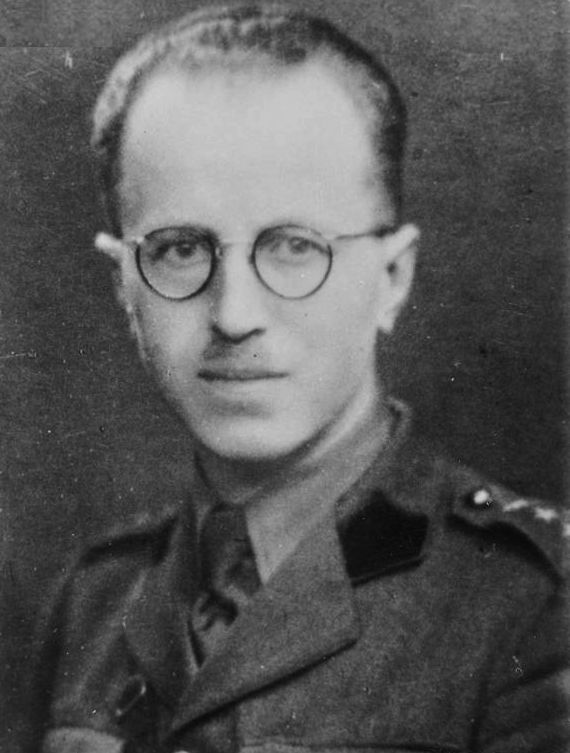
Commander of the Novogrudok partisan district of Home Army, Lieutenant Colonel Maciej Kalenkiewicz

===== Soviet reoccupation =====
In the summer of 1944, units of the Home Army's Novogrudok partisan district partook in Operation Ostra Brama, fighting alongside the Red Army to occupy Vilnius. On 8 July 1944, the Red Army reoccupied Novogrudok after almost three years of German occupation. However, after retaking Western Belorussia from the Germans, the recent allies became enemies. Thus, on 21 August 1944, in the village of Surkontakh, the commander of the Home Army's Novogrudok partisan district, Lieutenant Colonel Maciej Kalenkiewicz, nicknamed "Kotvich" (1906-1944) from the Khubala detachment, was killed in a battle with tenfold superior units of the NKVD. During the war, more than 45,000 people were killed in the city and the surrounding area, and over 60% of housing was destroyed.

After the war, on this region did the organization "the black cat", which was aimed at the struggle against the Soviet regime, so in March 1948, the United group of troops of the organization "the black cat" with several units "bulbivtsiv" (total 200 men) attacked the Novogrudok to release the arrested members of his organization. The city was the base of the MGB's Special Department, which fought against anti-Soviet partisans. The anti-Soviet partisan movement continued until the early 1960s until it completely ceased to exist.

After the war, the area remained part of the Byelorussian SSR, and most of the destroyed infrastructure was rapidly rebuilt. On 8 July 1954, following the disestablishment of the Baranavichy Region, the raion, along with Novogrudok, became part of the Grodno Region, where it still is, now in Belarus.

==== Cup of St. Jadwiga ====
During the archaeological excavations at the Small Castle in Novogrudok in the period from 1955 to 1962, conducted by the Leningrad Department of the Institute of Archaeology of the USSR Academy of Sciences, an artefact was found, called "glass carved glass", belonging to a group of glass carved glasses, known in medieval studies under the General name "Hedwig glass". The "Cup of Saint Jadwiga" found in Novogrudok (under this name the vessel is listed in the collection of the Hermitage Museum, this Cup was not returned to Belarus, despite requests from the Belarusian side), carved images of a lion, a Griffin and a stylized tree of life in the form of two snakes entwining the Cup of life. According to the British Museum, the vessels of this group are among the first hundred outstanding works of the material culture of universal civilization. All currently known cups of the "Hedwig glass" series, both preserved intact and individual fragments of these cups, were stored for many centuries exclusively in the capital cities of States that were either part of the medieval state of the Holy Roman Empire, or in the capitals of dynasties that had a kinship with the dynasties that ruled these States.

=== Recent history ===
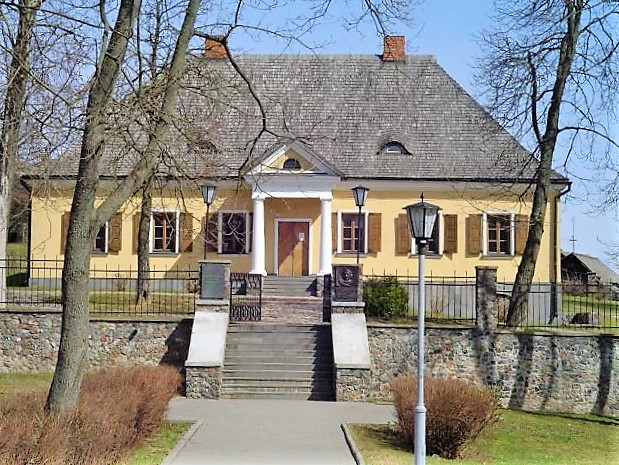
House of Adam Mickiewicz in Novogrudok

In 1997, Novogrudok and Novogrudoky district were merged into a single administrative unit. The city has links with the twin cities of Elbląg, Krynica Morska and Leymen.

On 10 September 2011, in honour of the 500th anniversary of the capital of the Grand Duchy of Lithuania Magdeburg law (freed from feudal duties, the power of voivodes, gave the right to create a magistrate-a self-government body, its seal and coat of arms – the image of the Archangel Michael) in the centre of the city as a memory of the history and former greatness of the ancient city, a memorial sign was installed.

According to the state program "Castles of Belarus", in 2012-15, it was planned to preserve the ruins of the Novogrudok castle with the restoration of its compositional structure and historical development, adaptation to modern social and cultural needs.

It was concluded that it is impractical to restore buildings that store artefacts from the 13th to 16th centuries. The concept of "solid ruins" was approved, developed and reviewed at the Republican scientific and methodological meeting, the purpose of which was to reveal all seven towers of the Navahrudak castle, as well as the spinning walls. Thus the castle will be designated in the size of the 16th century.

The metal structure and the brick prigruz will preserve the ruins of the Kostelnaya tower, stabilize it and complete the object's conservation. Eventually, when scientists are convinced that the stabilization was successful, the prigruz will be removed.

It will also partially restored the losses incurred by tower Shitovka. The tower will be covered with a roof, but will remain incomplete. It is planned to open a Museum, the Foundation of which will consist of exhibits that are now stored in the Novogrudok Museum of local history.

The Church of the 13th century, the remains of which are now underground, will be shown with an application. At the level of about 50 centimetres, the masonry of the Palace will be opened. It is not planned to lower the entire porch. The ramparts that were around the perimeter will also be partially open. No buildings will be built on the porch itself.

It is also planned to make a horizontal drainage to organize water drainage and stop the erosion of the soil of the southern slope.

According to the resolution of the Council of Ministers of 3 June 2016 No. 437, Novogrudok castle was included in the list of 27 objects whose conservation costs (in terms of capital expenditures) can be financed from the national budget.

=== Jewish history ===
Novogrudok had been an important Jewish centre. It was home to the Novardok yeshiva, founded by Rabbi Yosef Yozel Horwitz in 1896. It was the hometown of Rabbi Yechiel Michel Epstein and the Harkavy Jewish family, including Yiddish lexicographer Alexander Harkavy. Before the war, the population was 20,000, approximately half of whom were Jews. Meyer Meyerovitz and Meyer Abovitz were then the rabbis there. During a series of "actions" in 1941, the Germans killed all but 550 of the approximately 10,000 Jews. (The first mass murder of Novogrudok's Jews occurred in December 1941.) Those not killed were sent into slave labour.

== Notable people ==
- Adam Mickiewicz (1798–1855), Polish poet, dramatist, publicist and political activist, regarded as national poet in Poland, Lithuania and Belarus
- Alexander Sack (1890–1937), Belarusian Catholic priest and a Catholic convert from Orthodoxy
- Joseph Kushner (1922–1985), Polish-born American real estate investor and developer
- Paval Navara (1927–1983), Belarusian émigré public figure and a co-founder of the Anglo-Belarusian Society
- Siarhei Besarab (born 1984), Belarusian scientist and civil activist

== Sites ==
- Novogrudok Castle, sometimes anachronistically called Mindaugas' Castle, was built in the 14th century, was burnt down by the Swedes in 1706, and remains in ruins.
- Construction of the Orthodox SS. Boris and Gleb Church, in Belarusian Gothic style, started in 1519, but was not completed until the 1630s; it was extensively repaired in the 19th century.
- The Roman Catholic Transfiguration Church (1712–23, includes surviving chapels of an older gothic building), where Adam Mickiewicz was baptised.
- Museum of Adam Mickiewicz at the poet's former home; there are also his statue and the "Mound of Immortality", created in his honour by the Polish administration in 1924–1931.
- Museum of Jewish Resistance. Also, a red pebble path along the escape route during the heroic escape of ghetto inmates.
- Kastus Kachan Art Gallery
- Church of St. Michael, renovated in 1751 and 1831
- Trade rows at the central square
- Pre-war administration buildings, including the Nowogródek Voivodeship Office and the Voivode's House

Some members of the Harkavy family are buried at the old Jewish cemetery of Novogrudok.

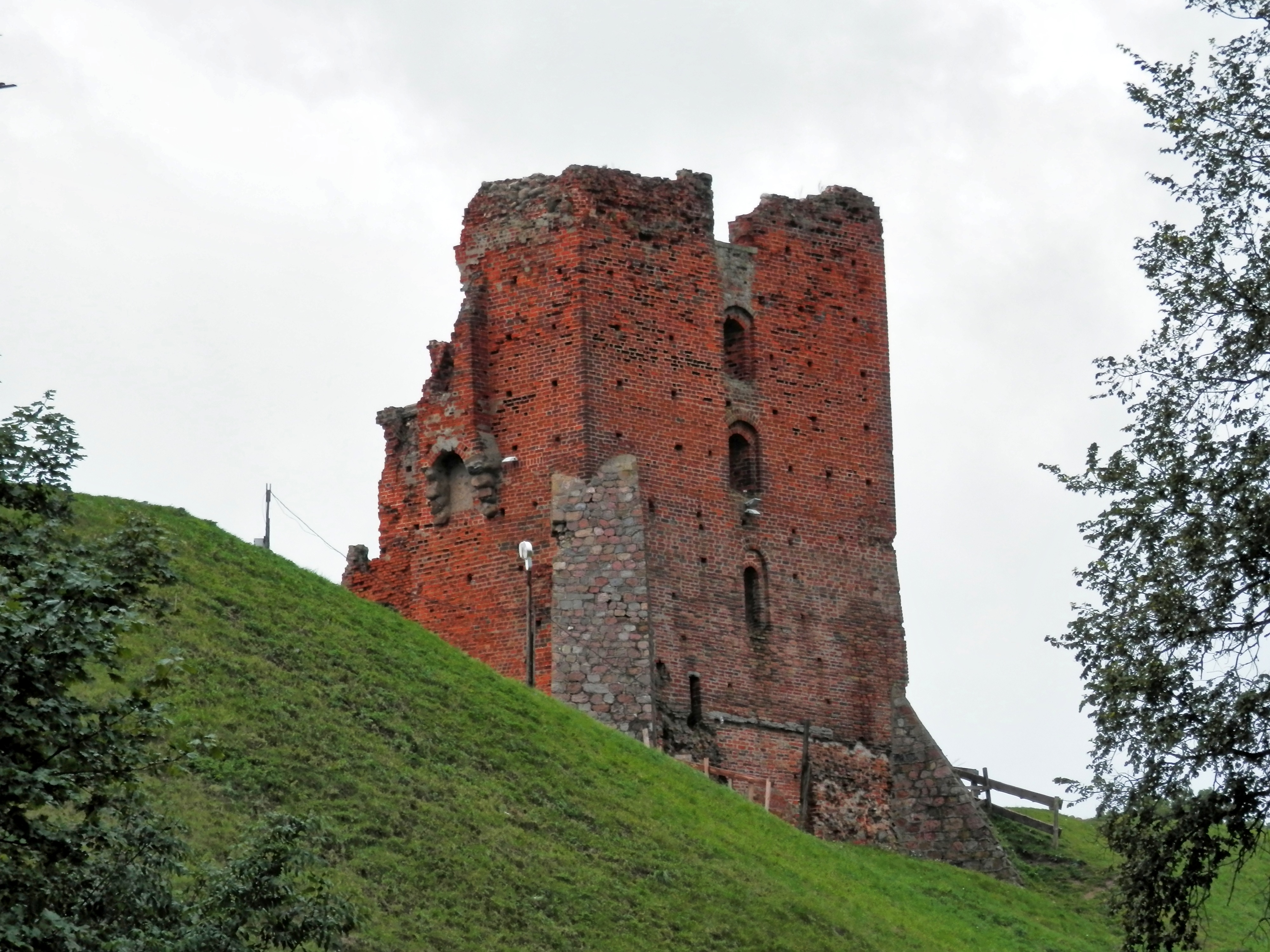
Ruins of the castle

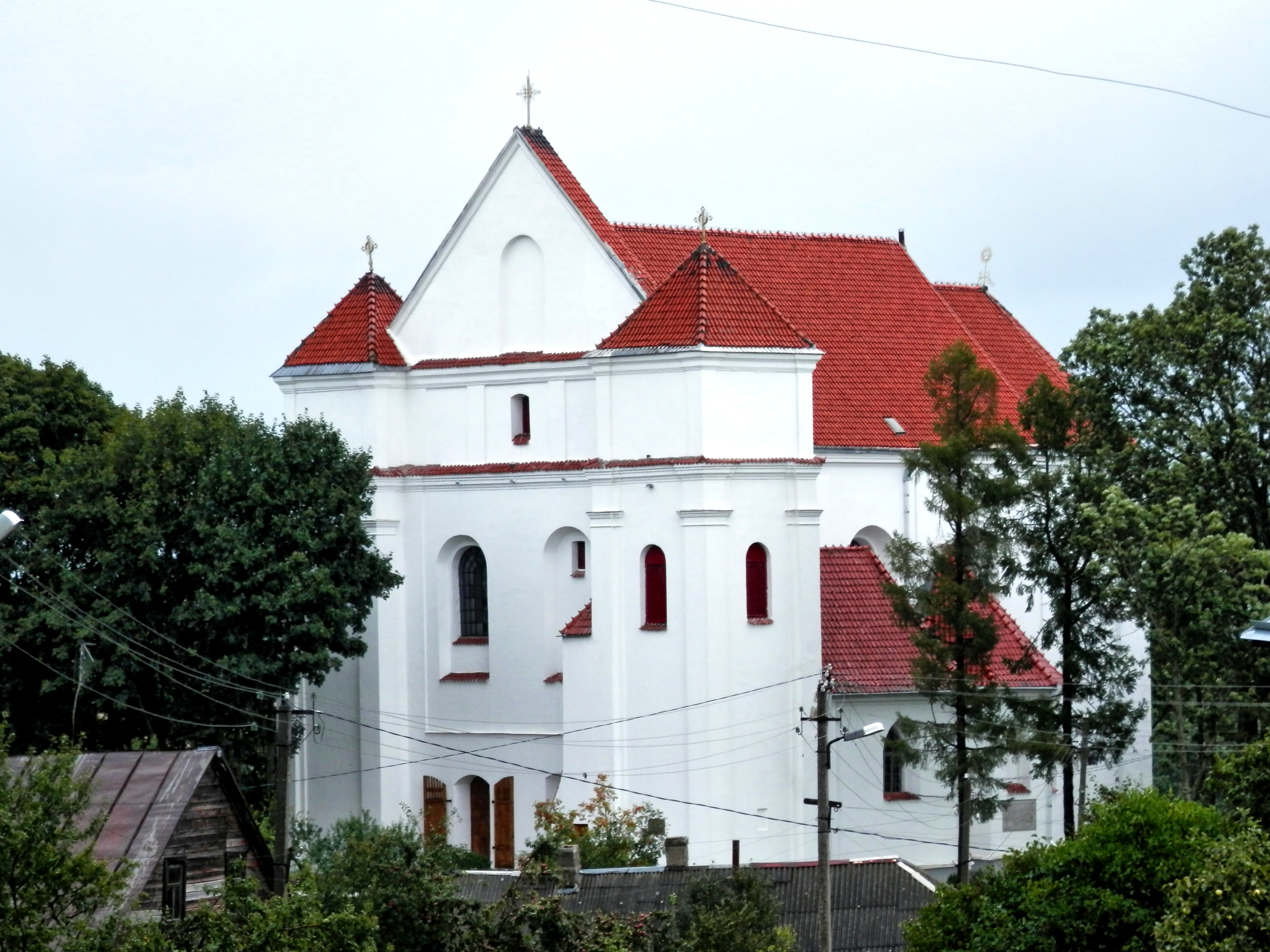
Transfiguration Church

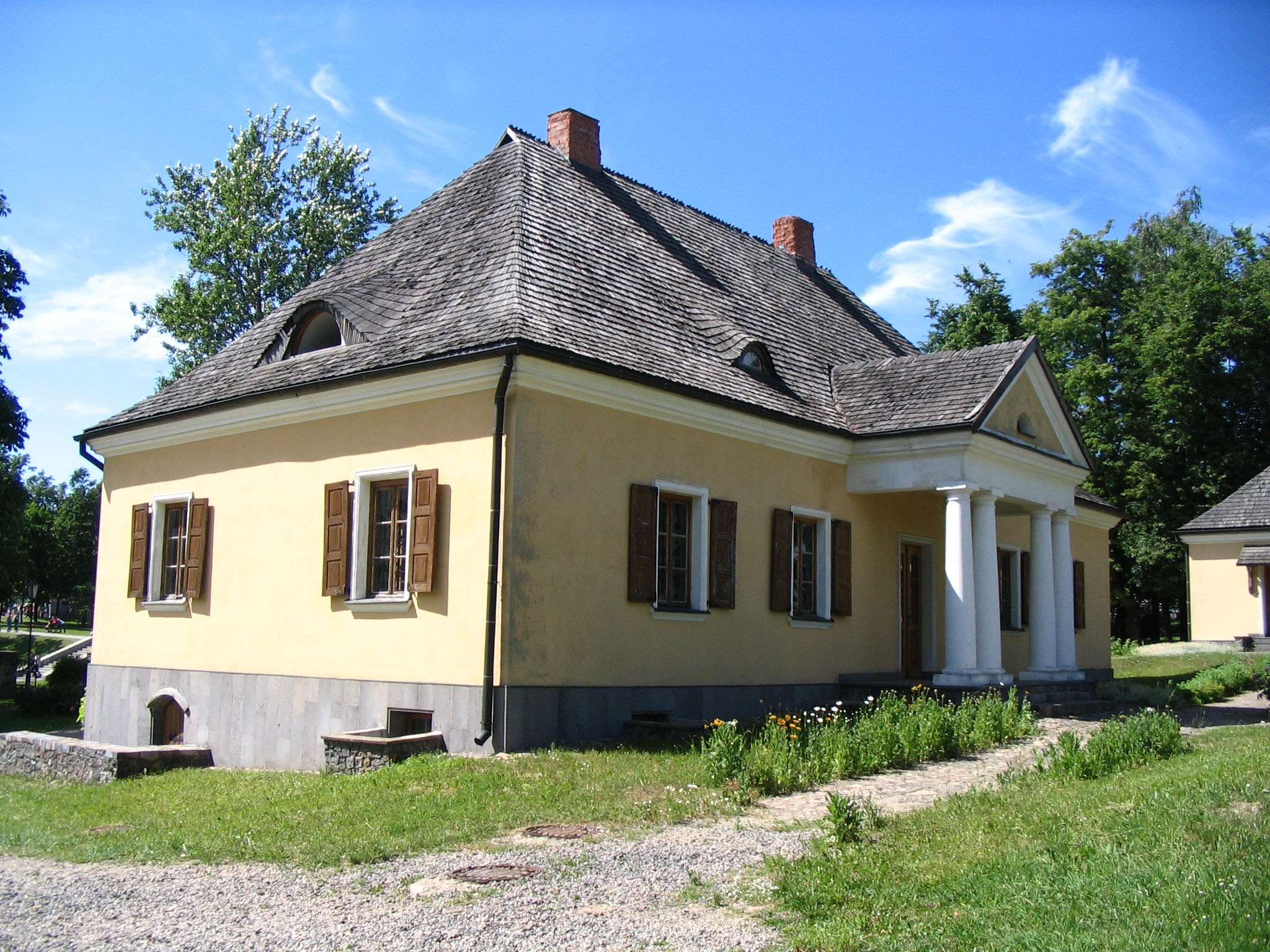
House of Adam Mickiewicz

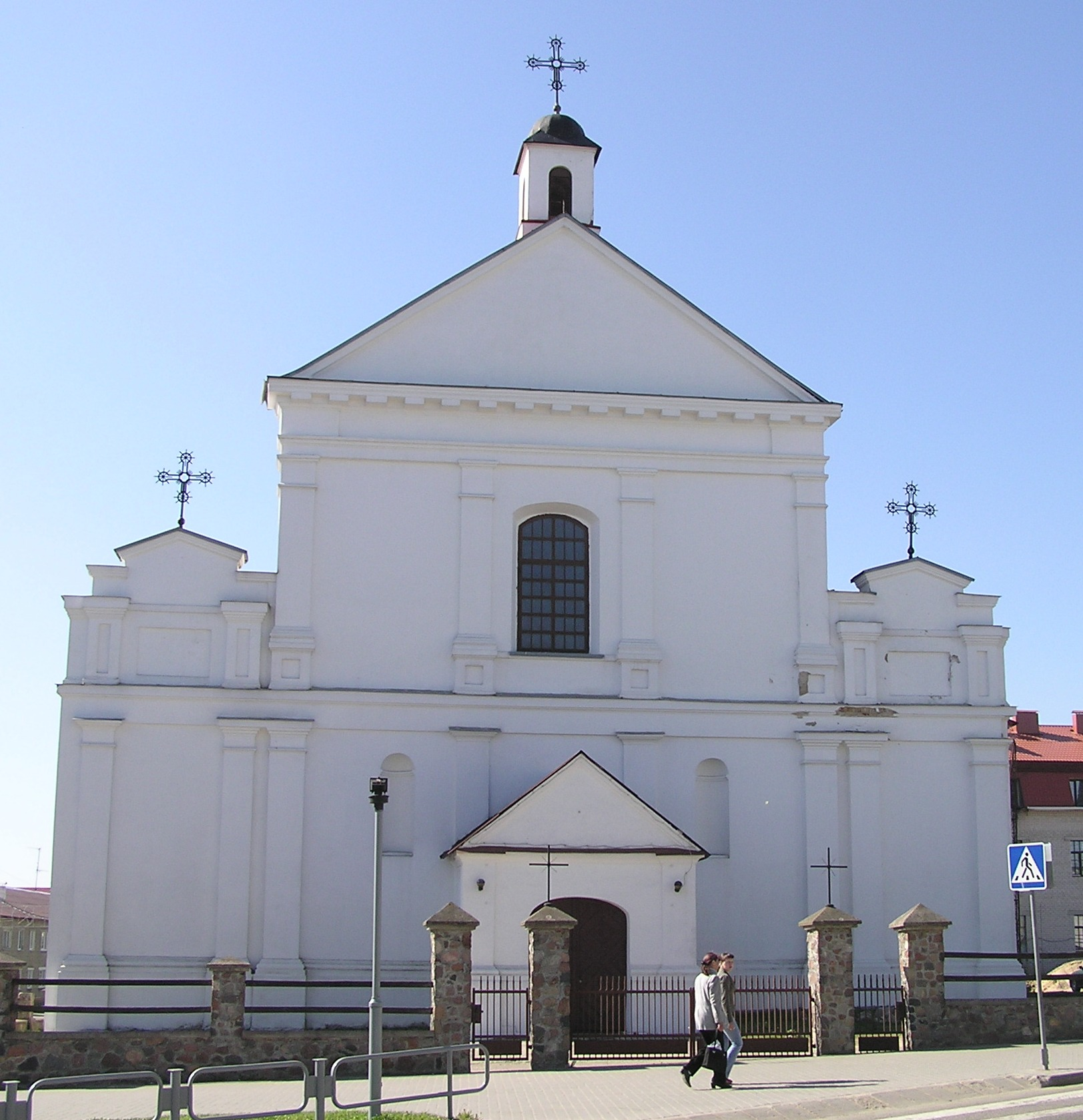
Church of Saint Michael Archangel

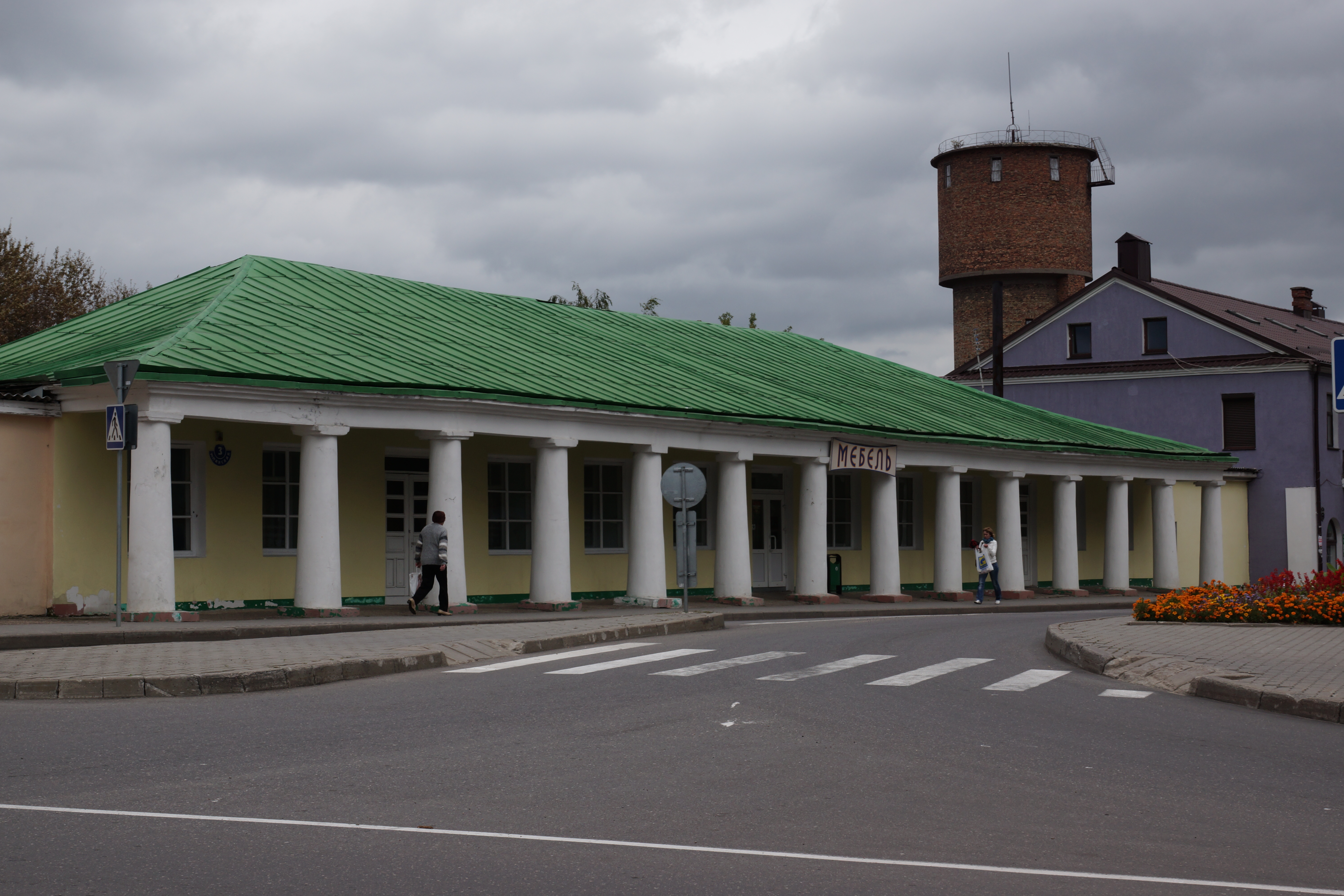
Trade rows

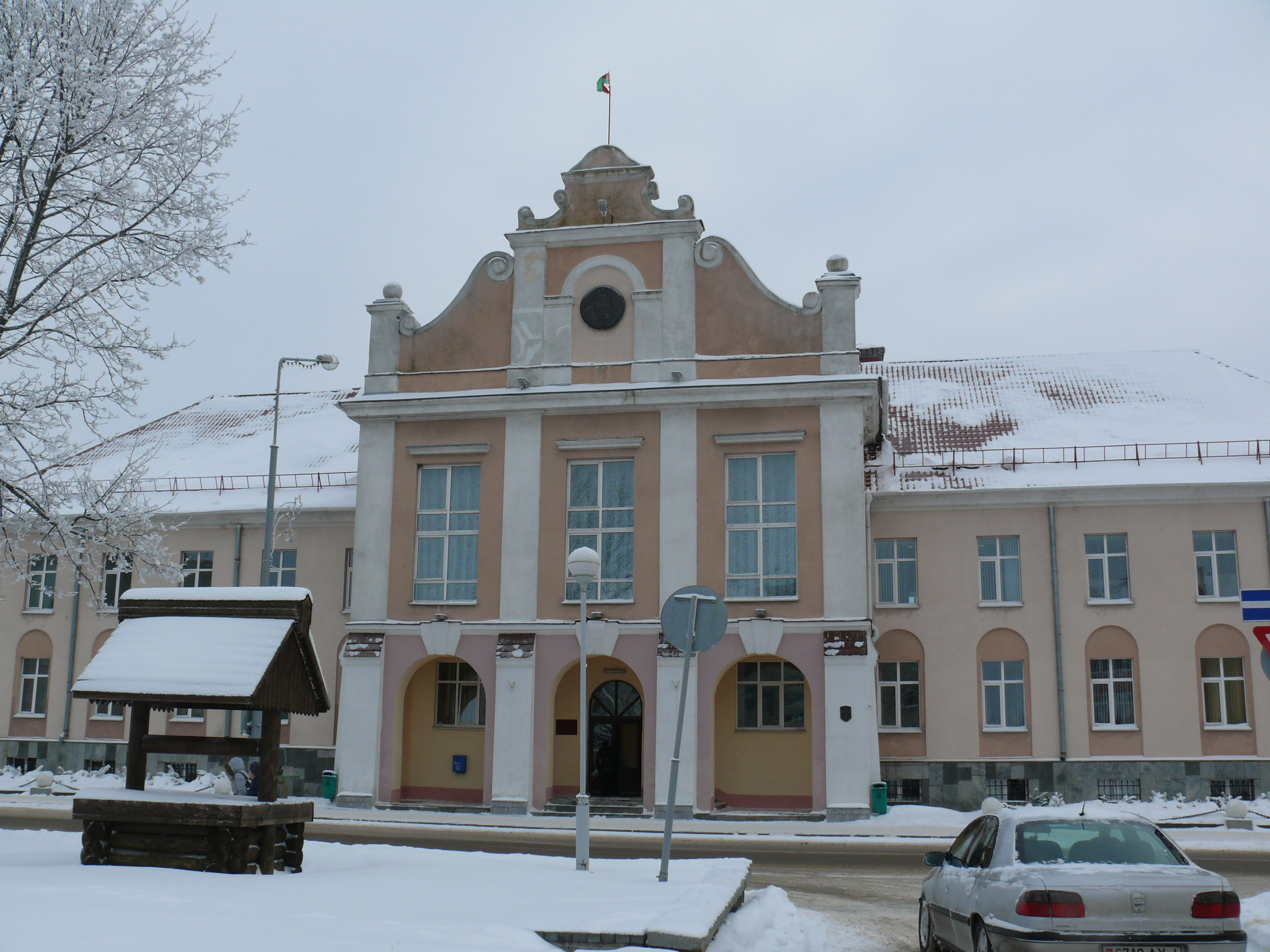
Pre-war Voivodeship Office

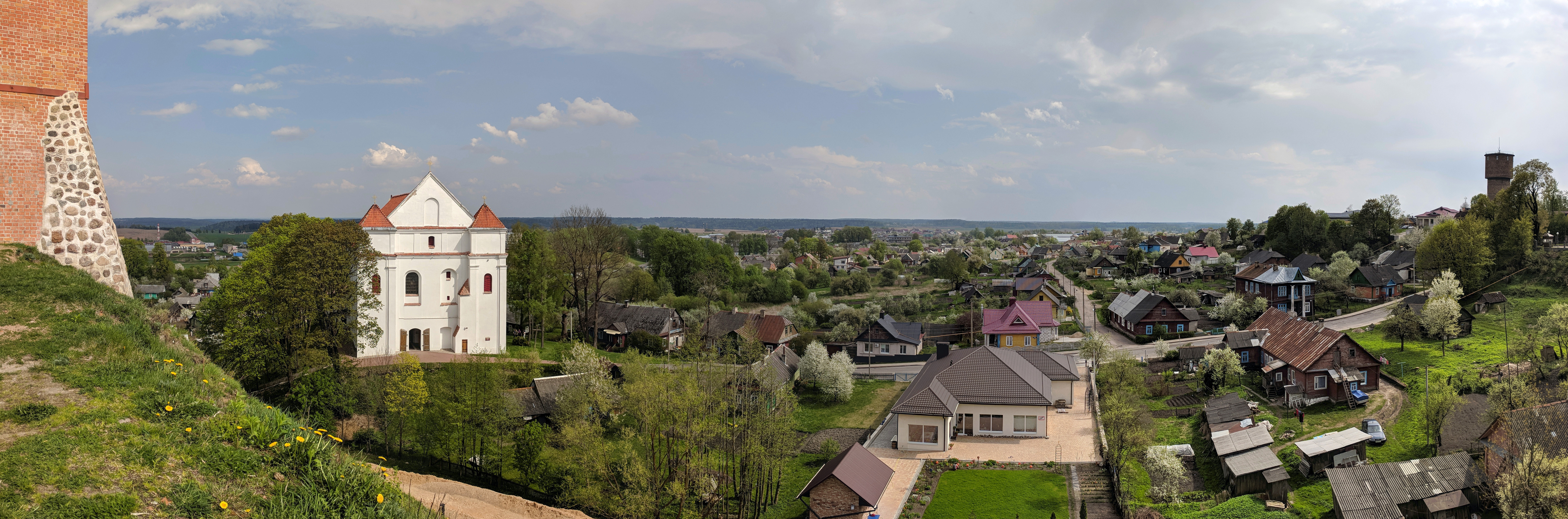
Panoramic view of Novogrudok, 2018

== Climate ==
The Köppen Climate Classification subtype for this climate is "Dfb" (Warm Summer Continental Climate).

Climate data for Novogrudok (1991–2020)
Month	Jan	Feb	Mar	Apr	May	Jun	Jul	Aug	Sep	Oct	Nov	Dec	Year
Record high °C (°F)	4.1 (39.4)	5.4 (41.7)	12.7 (54.9)	22.0 (71.6)	25.9 (78.6)	28.3 (82.9)	29.8 (85.6)	29.7 (85.5)	25.1 (77.2)	18.4 (65.1)	11.1 (52.0)	5.8 (42.4)	29.8 (85.6)
Mean daily maximum °C (°F)	−2.2 (28.0)	−1.1 (30.0)	4.0 (39.2)	12.2 (54.0)	18.0 (64.4)	21.3 (70.3)	23.4 (74.1)	22.8 (73.0)	17.1 (62.8)	10.1 (50.2)	3.5 (38.3)	−0.8 (30.6)	10.7 (51.3)
Daily mean °C (°F)	−4.3 (24.3)	−3.6 (25.5)	0.5 (32.9)	7.4 (45.3)	12.9 (55.2)	16.2 (61.2)	18.2 (64.8)	17.6 (63.7)	12.5 (54.5)	6.6 (43.9)	1.4 (34.5)	−2.6 (27.3)	6.9 (44.4)
Mean daily minimum °C (°F)	−6.3 (20.7)	−5.8 (21.6)	−2.4 (27.7)	3.3 (37.9)	8.2 (46.8)	11.6 (52.9)	13.8 (56.8)	13.2 (55.8)	8.8 (47.8)	3.9 (39.0)	−0.5 (31.1)	−4.5 (23.9)	3.6 (38.5)
Record low °C (°F)	−18.4 (−1.1)	−16.4 (2.5)	−9.8 (14.4)	−3.2 (26.2)	1.3 (34.3)	5.8 (42.4)	9.3 (48.7)	7.8 (46.0)	2.0 (35.6)	−3.2 (26.2)	−8.8 (16.2)	−13.4 (7.9)	−18.4 (−1.1)
Average precipitation mm (inches)	54.3 (2.14)	45.8 (1.80)	44.3 (1.74)	45.7 (1.80)	76.0 (2.99)	77.7 (3.06)	104.8 (4.13)	62.8 (2.47)	66.4 (2.61)	61.9 (2.44)	55.2 (2.17)	52.0 (2.05)	746.9 (29.41)
Average precipitation days (≥ 1.0 mm)	12.8	11.0	10.6	8.7	10.2	10.1	11.3	8.4	8.5	9.8	11.0	12.2	124.6
Source: NOAA

== Twin towns and sister cities ==
Novogrudok is twinned with:

- Bolsheboldinsky District, Russia
- Halych, Ukraine

=== Former twin towns ===
- Elbląg, Poland
- Krynica Morska, Poland
- Prienai, Lithuania
