= NKUS BSSR =

State body of the Byelorussian SSR (1920–1946)

People's Commissariat for Internal Affairs of the BSSR
- Народны камісарыят унутраных спраў БССР; Narodny kamisaryjat unutranych spraŭ BSSR

Agency overview
- Formed: December 17, 1920
- Dissolved: March 26, 1946
- Superseding agency: Ministry of Internal Affairs of the BSSR
- Type: People's Commissariat
- Jurisdiction: Byelorussian Soviet Socialist Republic
- Headquarters: Minsk
- Minister responsible: Stanisław Miertens, People's Commissar (1921)
- Parent agency: Council of People's Commissars of the BSSR

The People's Commissariat for Internal Affairs of the Byelorussian SSR (Belarusian: Наро́дны камісарыя́т уну́траных спраў БССР (НКУС БССР), NKUS BSSR; Russian: Народный комиссариат внутренних дел БССР, NKVD BSSR) was a republican state administration body responsible for combating crime and maintaining public order. It was directly involved in the deployment and implementation of mass repressions and killings in the BSSR (e.g., executions at Kurapaty).

== History ==
It was initially formed in December 1920 in accordance with the Additions to the Constitution of the SSRB, which were adopted by the II All-Belarusian Congress of Soviets. On 25 January 1921, the structure and staff of the NKUS of the BSSR were approved. The central apparatus of the NKUS consisted of departments (general; management; information and instructor; civil registry office; forced public works; estimate and financial), the Main Militia Directorate, and the Department of Communal Economy.

On 26 October 1921, a new structure of the NKUS of the BSSR was introduced. Instead of the existing departments, five directorates were created: Organizational and Administrative Directorate; Main Militia Directorate; Forced Labor Directorate; Communal Economy Directorate; Affairs Management Directorate.

By the resolution of the Presidium of the Central Executive Committee of the Byelorussian SSR of 13 December 1922, places of detention were transferred to the jurisdiction of the NKUS from the disposal of the People's Commissariat of Justice of the BSSR (NKYu). In accordance with this, the NKUS and NKYu of the BSSR adopted a resolution "On the reorganization of the management of places of detention". The Central Correctional Labor Department of the NKYu transferred to the NKUS was reorganized into the Main Directorate of Places of Detention of the NKUS of the BSSR, and the Forced Labor Directorate of the NKUS of the BSSR was abolished.

On 22 March 1924, the Criminal Investigation Directorate was liquidated, and its functions were transferred to the Main Militia of the BSSR. In this regard, the Main Directorate of the Workers' and Peasants' Militia of the BSSR was renamed the Directorate of Militia and Criminal Investigation of the BSSR.

In May 1927, the structure of the NKUS BSSR apparatus was reorganized according to a functional system. Directorates were renamed inspectorates, a secretariat was created, and the board was abolished; the Directorate of Militia and Criminal Investigation became the Administrative Directorate, the head of which was the deputy people's commissar and head of the criminal investigation department. As a result of the transformations, the NKUS BSSR apparatus acquired a new structure: secretariat, inspectorates (for organizational issues; places of detention; communal economy; road; fire; republican engineer).

According to the resolution of the CEC of the USSR and the SNK of the USSR "On the abolition of people's commissariats of the union and autonomous republics" of 15 December 1930, it was abolished.

It was formed for the second time on the basis of the reorganized OGPU of the BSSR on 13 July 1934 by NKVD order No. 001. The structure of the NKUS of the BSSR included directorates (state security; workers' and peasants' militia; border and internal guards; fire protection; corrective labor camps).

== People's Commissars of Internal Affairs ==
- Stanisław Miertens — 1921
- Prakop Malakovič — 1922–1923
- Dzmitry Čarnuševič — March 1924 – April 1925
- Aliaksandr Chackievič — April 1925 – February 1926
- Aliaksandr Stašeŭski — February 1926 – 1 September 1928
- Roman Pilar — 26 November – 17 December 1929
- Ryhor Rapaport — 17 December 1929 – January 1930
- Leonid Zakovsky — 15 July 1934 – 10 December 1934
- Israel Leplevsky — 10 December 1934 – 28 November 1936
- Georgy Molchanov — 28 November 1936 – 3 February 1937
- Boris Berman — 4 March 1937 – 22 May 1938
- Aleksei Nasedkin — 22 May 1938 – 17 December 1938
- Lavrenty Tsanava — 17 December 1938 – 26 February 1941
- Aleksandr Matveyev — 26 February 1941 – 16 January 1942
- Sergei Belchenko — 30 October 1943 – 26 March 1946

== Structure ==
- UNKUS for the Baranavichy Voblast created on 2 December 1939 by NKUS order No. 001337 (from 2 November to 4 December 1939 — UNKUS for the Navahrudak Voblast)
- UNKUS for the Belastok Voblast created on 2 December 1939 by NKUS order No. 001337
- UNKUS for the Brest Voblast created on 2 December 1939 by NKUS order No. 001441
- UNKUS for the Vileyka Voblast created on 2 December 1939 by NKUS order No. 001337
- UNKUS for the Viciebsk Voblast created on 17 April 1938 by NKUS order No. 00232
- UNKUS for the Homiel Voblast created on 17 April 1938 by NKUS order No. 00232
- UNKUS for the Minsk Voblast created on 17 April 1938 by NKUS order No. 00232
- UNKUS for the Mahiliou Voblast created on 17 April 1938 by NKUS order No. 00232
- UNKUS for the Pinsk Voblast created on 2 December 1939 by NKUS order No. 001337
- UNKUS for the Palessie Voblast created on 17 April 1938 by NKUS order No. 00232
