= Regions of Belarus =

First-level administrative divisions of Belarus

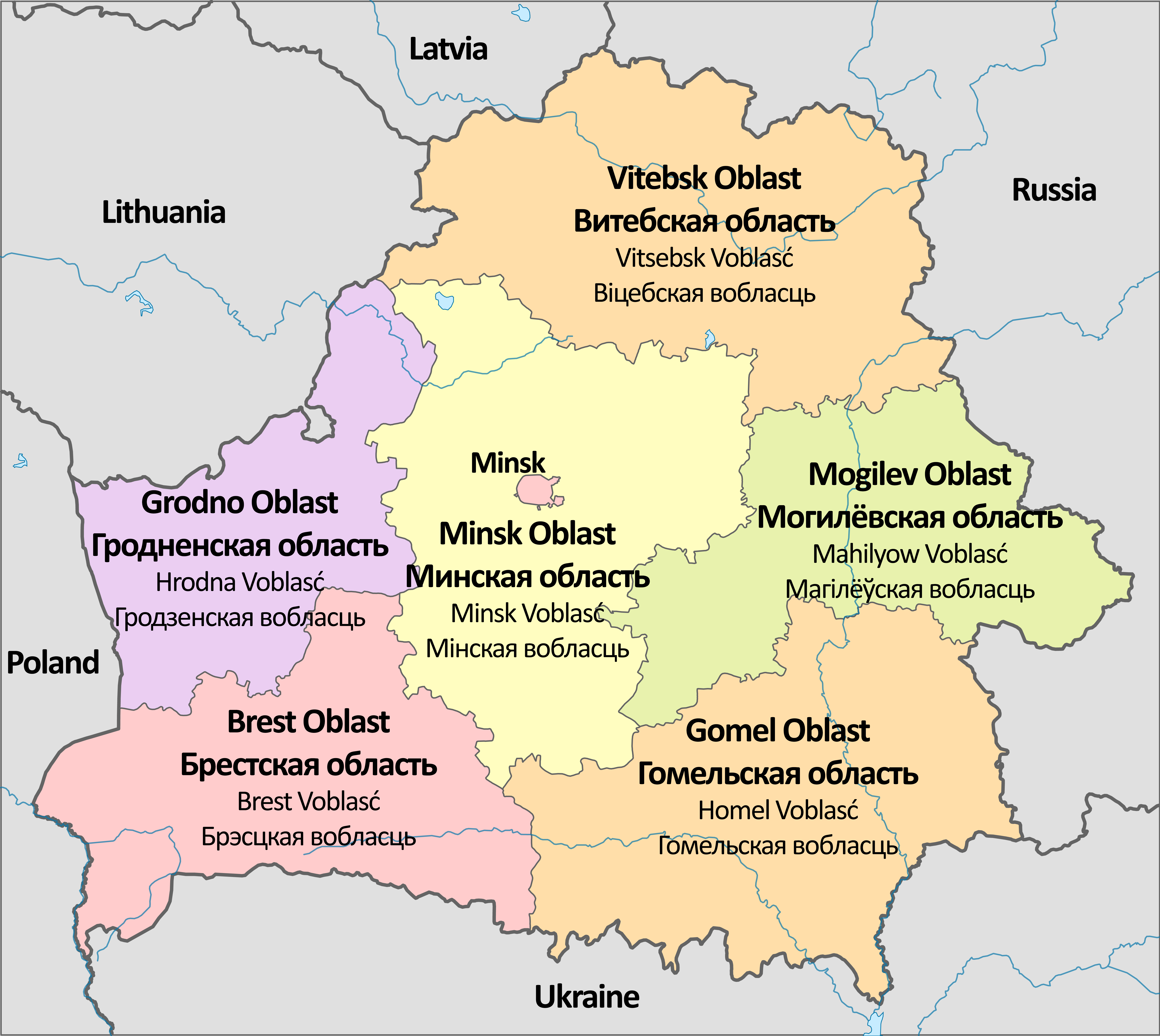
- Category: First-level subdivision of a unitary state
- Location: Belarus
- Created: 1960
- Number: 6 regions 1 capital city
- Populations: (Regions only): 981,174 (Mogilev) – 1,460,289 (Minsk)
- Areas: (Regions only): 25,118.1 km^{2} (9,698.14 sq mi) (Grodno) – 40,361.6 km^{2} (15,583.72 sq mi) (Gomel)
- Government: Province government
- Subdivisions: Raion

At the top level of administration, Belarus is divided into six regions and one capital city. The six regions are oblasts (also known as voblastsi), while the city of Minsk has a special status as the capital of Belarus. Minsk also serves as the administrative center of Minsk Region.

At the second level, the regions are divided into districts (raions).

The layout and extent of the regions were set in 1960 when Belarus (then the Byelorussian Soviet Socialist Republic) was a constituent republic of the Soviet Union.

== History ==
At the start of the 20th century, the boundaries of the Belarusian lands within the Russian Empire were still being defined. In 1900 it was contained within all of the Minsk and Mogilev governorates, most of Grodno Governorate, parts of Vitebsk Governorate, and parts of Vilna Governorate. World War I, the independence of Poland, as well as the 1920–1921 Polish–Soviet War affected the boundaries. In 1921, Belarus had what is now all of Minsk Governorate except for the western fringe, the western part of Gomel Region, a western slice of Mogilev, and a small part of Vitebsk Region. In 1926, the eastern part of Gomel region was added.

In the Byelorussian SSR, new administrative units, called oblasts or voblastsi (cognate of Russian word oblast with prothetic v-) were introduced in 1938. During World War II, Belarus gained territory to the west, with the Baranavichy, Belastok (Białystok), Brest, Pinsk, and Vileyka oblasts. In 1944, Belastok was eliminated and the new oblasts of Babruysk, Grodno, and Polotsk were created. At that same time, Vileika oblast was renamed Molodechno Oblast.

At different times between 1938 and 1960, the following oblasts existed:

- Babruysk Oblast, created 1944, eliminated 1954
- Baranavichy Oblast, created 1939, eliminated 1954
- Belastok Oblast, created 1939, eliminated 1944 (now Białystok in Poland)
- Brest Oblast, created 1939
- Gomel Oblast, created 1938
- Grodno Oblast, created 1944
- Maladzyechna Oblast renamed from Vileyka Oblast 1944, eliminated 1960
- Mogilev Oblast, created 1938
- Minsk Oblast, created 1938
- Navahrudak Oblast, created 1939, renamed Baranavichy Oblast December 1939
- Pinsk Oblast, created 1939, eliminated 1954
- Polatsk Oblast, created 1944, eliminated 1954
- Polesia Oblast, created 1938, eliminated 1954
- Vitebsk Oblast, created 1938
- Vileyka Oblast, created 1939, renamed to Maladzyechna Oblast 1944

== Regions ==
Regions of Belarus
| | Flag | Region | Capital | Russian | Belarusian | Population (2024) | Area (km^{2}) | Density | % of population | GDP | Average monthly gross wage |
|---|---|---|---|---|---|---|---|---|---|---|---|
| 1 | Minsk, Belarus | City of Minsk | | Минск | Мінск | 1,992,862 | 305.50 | 6,606.48 | 21.44% | US$ 22.6 billion | US$ 953 |
| 2 | Brest Voblast, Belarus | Brest | Brest | Брестская | Брэсцкая | 1,308,569 | 32,790.68 | 41.11 | 14.32% | US$ 8.4 billion | US$ 639 |
| 3 | Homyel Voblast | Gomel | Gomel | Гомельская | Гомельская | 1,338,617 | 40,361.66 | 34.40 | 14.75% | US$ 8.8 billion | US$ 643 |
| 4 | Hrodna Voblasts | Grodno | Grodno | Гродненская | Гродзенская | 992,556 | 25,118.07 | 40.88 | 10.91% | US$ 8.1 billion | US$ 643 |
| 5 | Mahilyow Voblast | Mogilev | Mogilev | Могилёвская | Магілёўская | 981,174 | 29,079.01 | 35.24 | 10.89% | US$ 5.7 billion | US$ 600 |
| 6 | Minsk Voblast | Minsk | Minsk | Минская | Мінская | 1,460,289 | 39,912.35 | 36.86 | 15.63% | US$ 14.1 billion | US$ 720 |
| 7 | Vitsebsk Voblasts | Vitebsk | Vitebsk | Витебская | Вiцебская | 1,081,911 | 40,049.99 | 28.36 | 12.06% | US$ 6.8 billion | US$ 602 |
| | | Belarus | Minsk | Беларусь | | 9,155,978 | 207,617.26 | 45.34 | 100.00% | US$ 74.5 billion | US$ 714 |

== Historical division ==
Administrative division of Byelorussian SSR by year

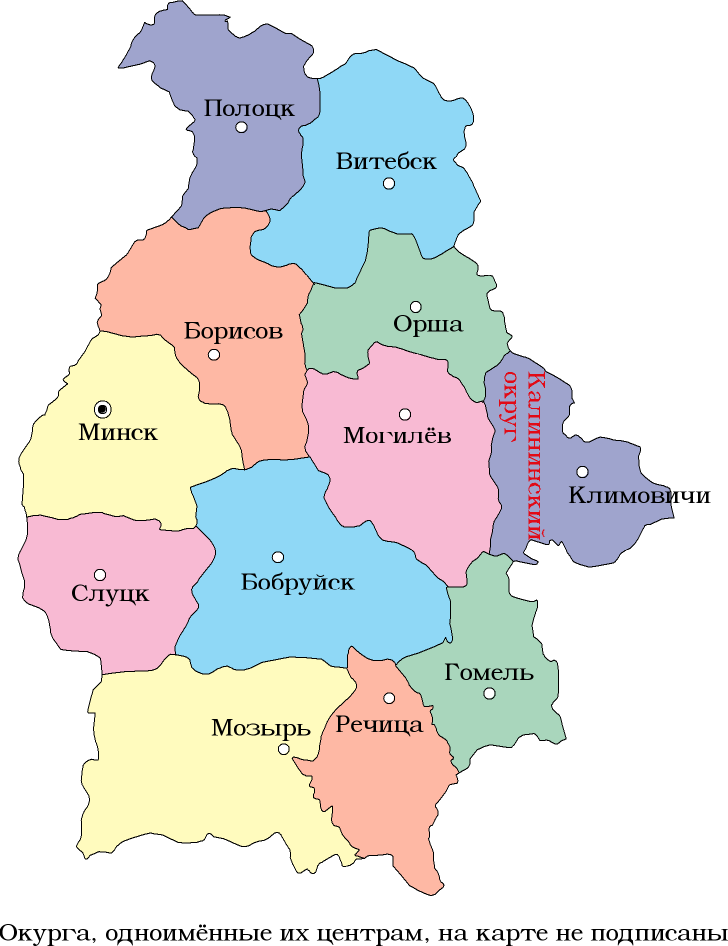
1926

1927

1940

1945

1955

== See also ==
- ISO 3166-2:BY, the ISO codes of the regions of Belarus.
- List of regions of Belarus by Human Development Index
- Districts of Belarus, 2nd level subdivision
- Rural councils of Belarus, 3rd level subdivision
