= Western Belorussia =

Historical region of Belarus

Western Belarus
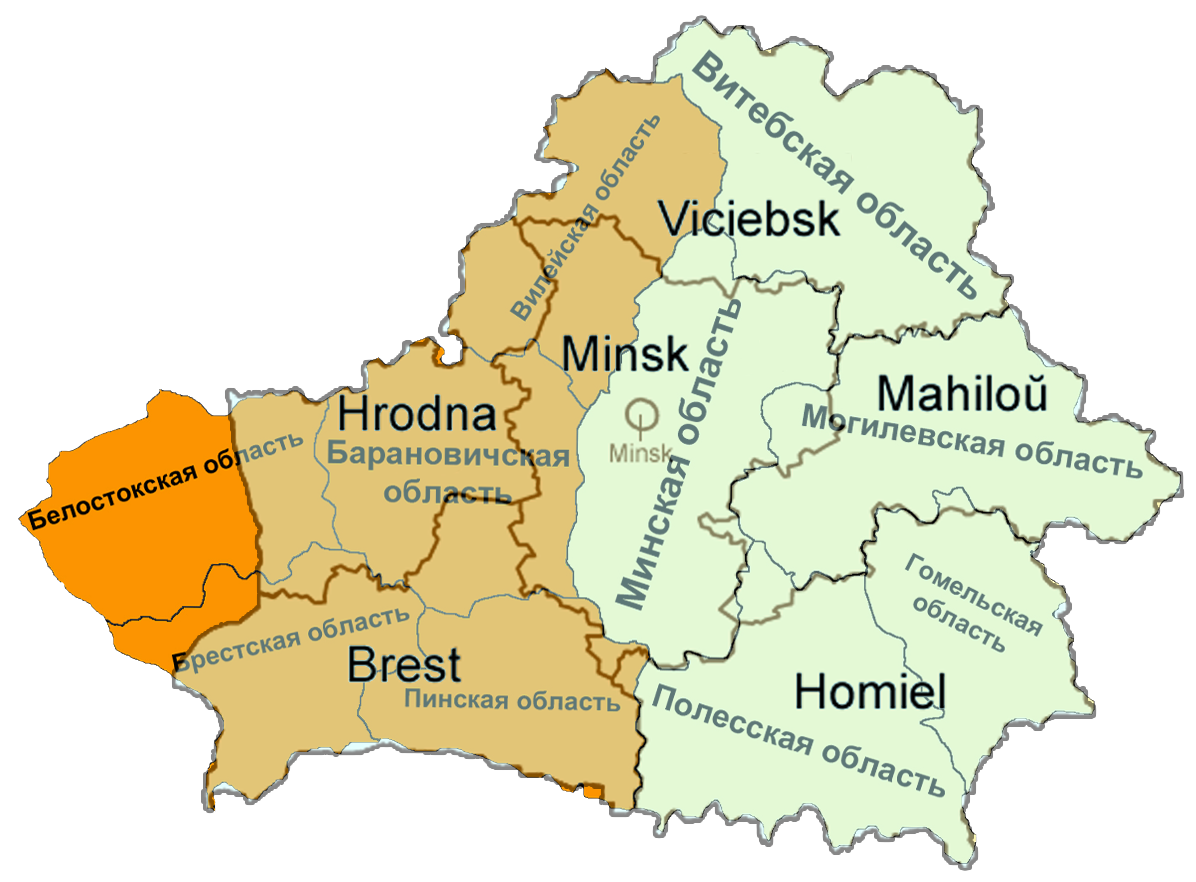
- Administrative division of the Byelorussian SSR (green) before World War II with territories annexed by the USSR from Poland in 1939 (marked in shades of orange), overlaid with territory of present-day Belarus

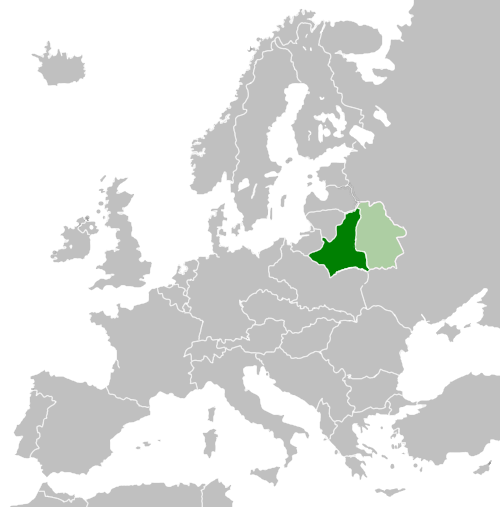
- Western Belorussia in 1925 shown in dark green and the Byelorussian Soviet Socialist Republic shown in light green
- Country: Belarus, partly in Poland and Lithuania
- Area: Historical region
- Today part of: Grodno, Brest, Minsk (partially) and Vitsebsk (partially); Podlaskie Voivodeship (partially), Southeastern Lithuania including Vilnius

Western Belorussia or Western Belarus (Belarusian: Заходняя Беларусь, romanized: Zachodniaja Biełaruś; Polish: Zachodnia Białoruś; Russian: Западная Белоруссия, romanized: Zapadnaya Belorussiya) is a historical region of modern-day Belarus which belonged to the Second Polish Republic during the interwar period. For twenty years before the 1939 invasion of Poland, it was the northern part of the Polish Kresy macroregion. Following the end of World War II in Europe, most of Western Belorussia was ceded to the Soviet Union by the Allies, while some of it, including Białystok, was given to the Polish People's Republic. Until the dissolution of the Soviet Union in 1991, Western Belorussia formed the western part of the Byelorussian Soviet Socialist Republic (BSSR). Today, it constitutes the west of modern Belarus.

Created by the USSR after the conquest of Poland, the new western provinces of Byelorussian SSR acquired from Poland included Baranavichy, Belastok, Brest, Vileyka and the Pinsk Regions. The majority of Belastok Region was returned to Poland and the rest of the regions were reorganized one more time after the Soviet conquest of Belarus into the contemporary western provinces of Belarus which include all of Grodno and Brest regions, as well as parts of today's Minsk and Vitebsk regions. Vilnius was returned by the USSR to the Republic of Lithuania which soon after that became the Lithuanian SSR.

== Background ==
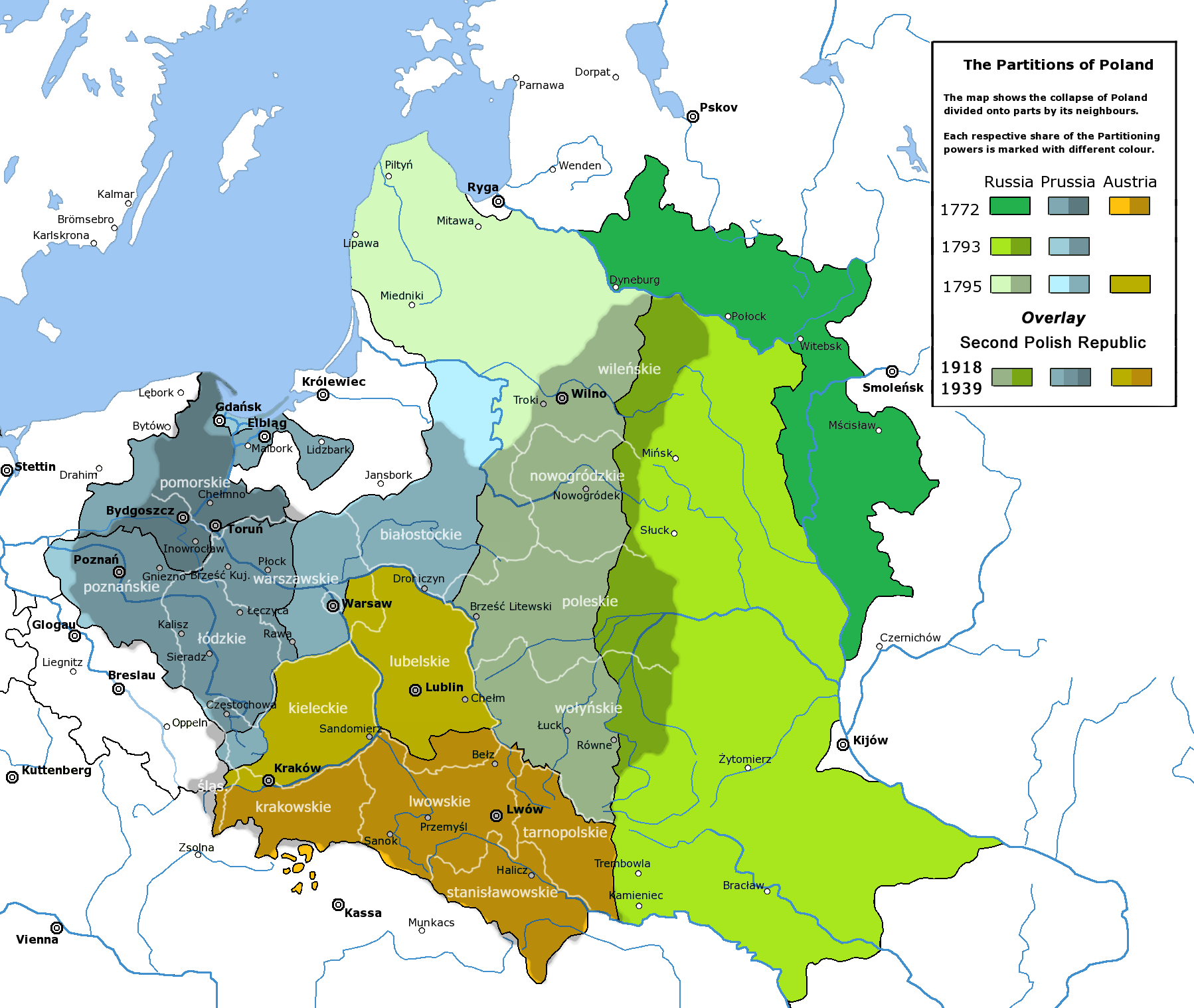
Outline of the Polish–Lithuanian Commonwealth before the Partitions of Poland in 1772, 1793, and 1795, overlaid with the outline of the Second Republic (1918–1939). Most territories annexed by the Russian Empire during the partitions (in shades of green) remained in the Soviet Union after World War I.

The territories of contemporary Belarus, Poland, Ukraine, and the Baltic states were a major theatre of operations during World War I; all the while, the Bolshevik Coup overturned the interim Russian Provisional Government and formed Soviet Russia. The Bolsheviks withdrew from the war with the Central Powers by signing the Treaty of Brest-Litovsk, and ceded Belarus to Germany for the next eight and a half months. The German high command used this window of opportunity to transfer its troops to the Western Front for the 1918 Spring Offensive, leaving behind a power vacuum. The non-Russians inhabiting the lands ceded by the Soviets to the German Empire, saw the treaty as an opportunity to set up independent states under the German umbrella. Three weeks after the Treaty of Brest-Litovsk was signed on 3 March 1918, the newly formed Belarusian Central Council founded the Belarusian People's Republic. The idea was rejected by the Germans, the Bolsheviks and the Americans. Woodrow Wilson rejected it, because the Americans intended to protect the territorial integrity of European Russia.

The fate of the region was not settled for the following three and a half years. The Polish–Soviet War which erupted in 1919, was particularly bitter; it ended with the Peace of Riga of 1921. Poland and the Baltic states emerged as independent countries bordering the USSR. The territory of modern-day Belarus was split by the treaty into Western Belorussia ruled by the Polish and the Soviet Eastern Belorussia, with the border town in Mikaszewicze. Notably, the peace treaty was signed with the full active participation of the Belarusian delegation on the Soviet side. In paragraph 3, Poland abandoned all rights and claims to the territories of Soviet Belarus, while Soviet Russia abandoned all rights and claims to Polish Western Belarus.

=== Rada of the Belarusian Democratic Republic in Exile ===
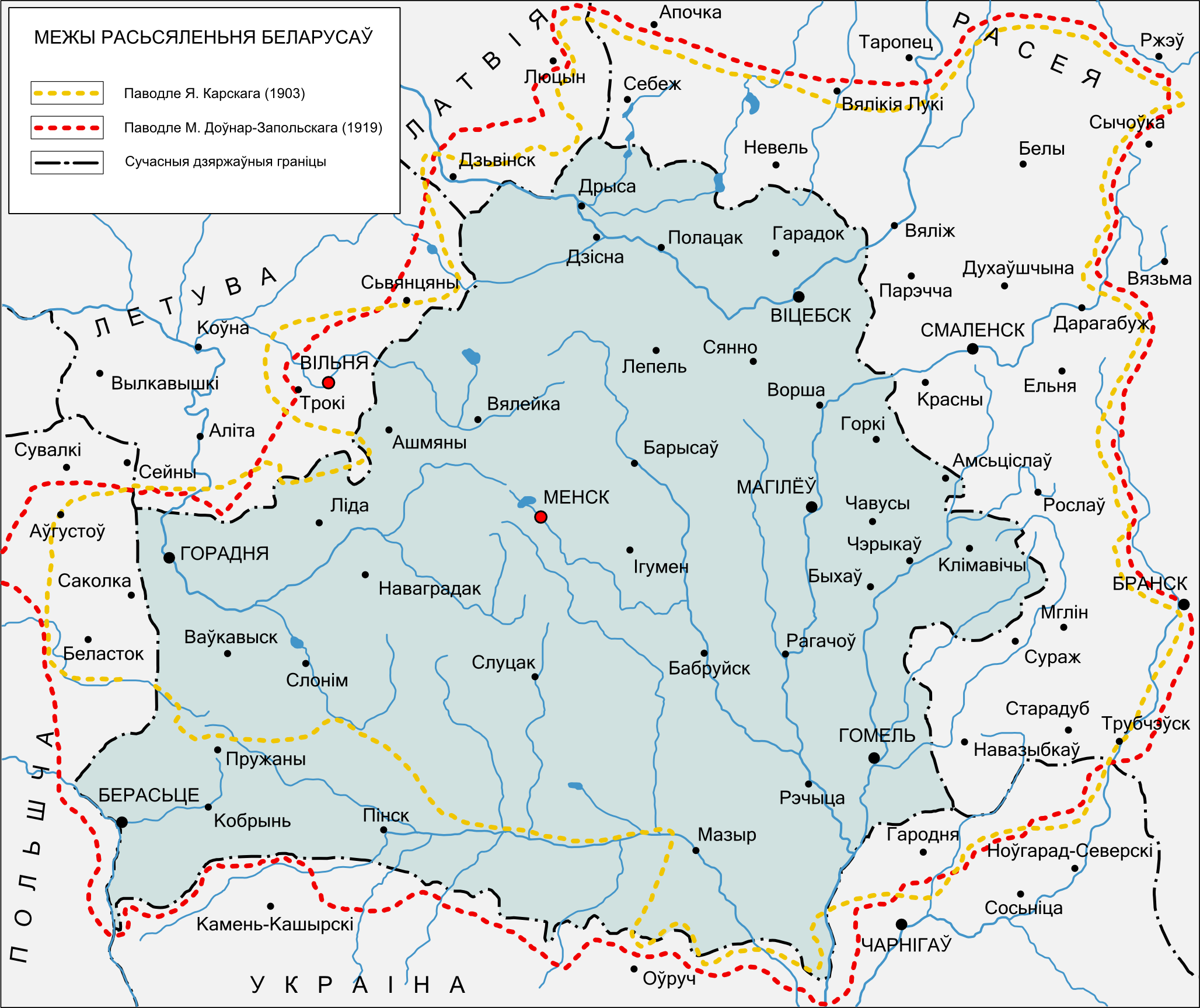
Presumed greatest extent of areas with Belarusian presence according to research by Belarusian ethnographers Yefim Karsky (1903, yellow) and Mitrofan Dovnar-Zapol'skiy (1919, red), overlaid with the territory of post-1991 Belarus (green)

As soon as the Soviet-German peace treaty was signed in March 1918, the newly formed Rada of the Belarusian Democratic Republic laid territorial claims to Belarus based on areas specified in the Third Constituent Charter unilaterally as inhabited by the Belarusian majority. The same Rada charter also declared that the Treaty of Brest-Litowsk of March 1918 was invalid because it was signed by foreign governments partitioning territories that were not theirs.

In February 1919, a joint Lithuanian Belorussian Soviet Republic (Litbel) was established, and then a separate Byelorussian SSR. Thus, the almost unsolicited national state, which arose during the First World War, owed its existence directly to the alternative German, Russian and Polish attempts to secure control over the area. — Tania Raffass

In the Second Constituent Charter, the Rada abolished the right to private ownership of land (paragraph 7) in line with the Communist Manifesto. Meanwhile, by 1919, the Bolsheviks took control over large parts of Belarus and forced the Belarusian Rada into exile in Germany. The Bolsheviks formed the Socialist Soviet Republic of Byelorussia during the war with Poland on roughly the same territory claimed by the Belarusian Republic.

The League of Nations ratified the new Polish-Soviet border. The peace agreement remained in place throughout the interwar period. The borders established between the two countries remained in force until World War II and the 17 September 1939 Soviet invasion of Poland. On Joseph Stalin's insistence, the borders were redrawn in the Yalta and Potsdam Conferences.

== Second Polish Republic ==
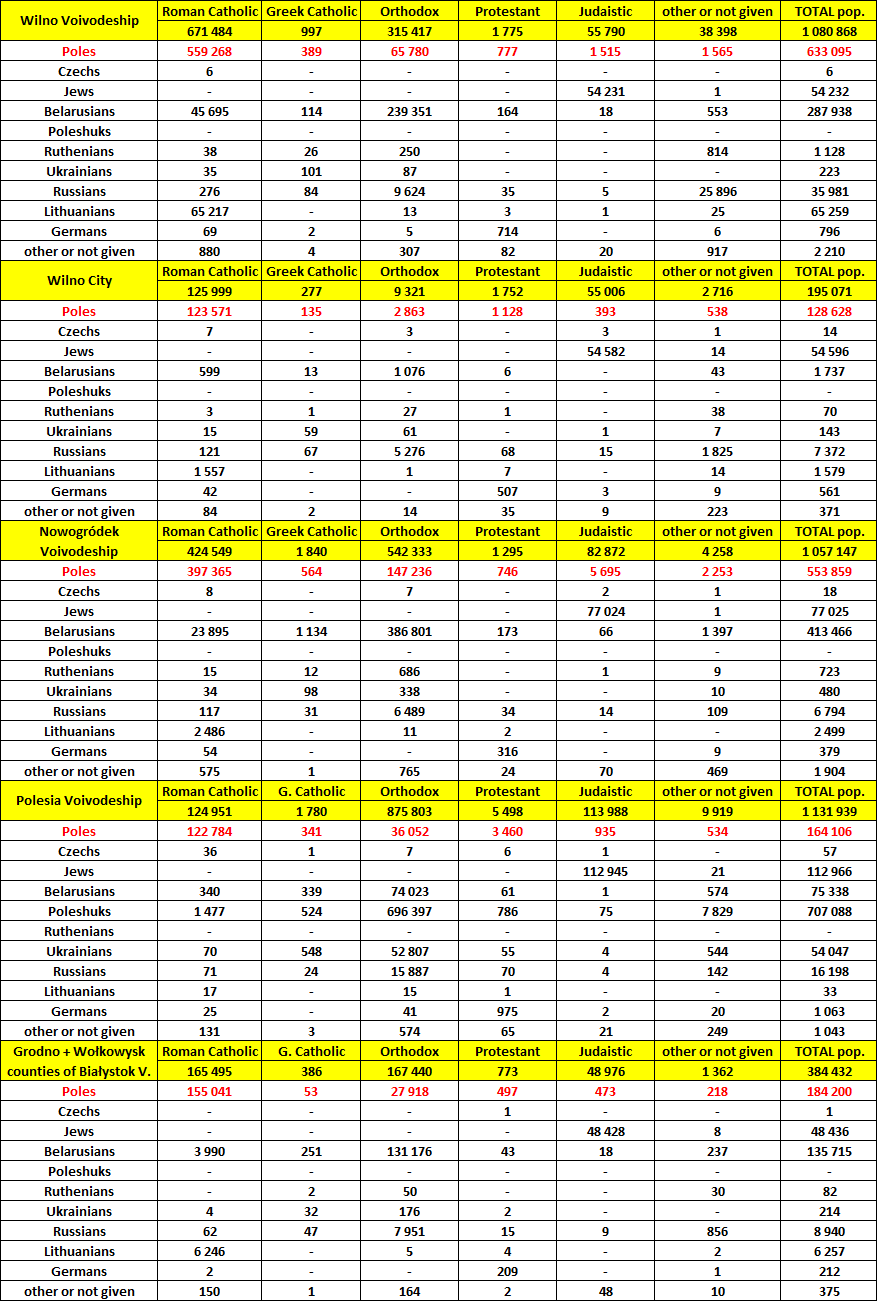
Linguistic (mother tongue) and religious structure of Northern Kresy (today parts of Belarus and Lithuania) according to the Polish census of 1931

"Despite Soviet efforts at sealing the border [with Poland], peasants – refugees from the BSSR – crossed into Poland in the tens of thousands, wrote Per Anders Rudling. According to the Polish census of 1921, there were around 1 million Belarusians in the country. Some estimated the number of Belarusians in Poland at that time to be perhaps 1.7 million, or even up to 2 million. Following the Peace of Riga, thousands of Poles settled in the area, many of them (including veterans of armed struggle for Poland's independence) were given land by the government.

In his negotiations with Belarusian leaders in Vilnius, Józef Piłsudski rejected the call for Western Belorussian independence. In December 1919 the Rada was dissolved by Poland, while by early January 1920 a new body was formed, the Rada Najwyższa, without aspirations for independence, but with proposed cultural, social and educational functions. Józef Piłsudski negotiated with the Western Belorussian leadership, but eventually abandoned the ideas of Intermarium, his own proposed federation of partially self-governing states on the lands of the former Polish–Lithuanian Commonwealth.

In the 1922 Polish legislative election, the Belarusian party in the Bloc of National Minorities obtained 14 seats in the Polish parliament (11 of them in the Sejm). In the spring of 1923, Polish prime minister Władysław Sikorski ordered a report on the situation of the Belarusian minority in Poland. That summer, a new regulation was passed allowing for the Belarusian language to officially be used in courts and schools. Obligatory teaching of the Belarusian language was introduced in all Polish gymnasia in areas inhabited by Belarusians in 1927.

=== Polonization ===
The Belarusian population of West Belarus faced active Polonization by the central Polish authorities. The policy pressured Belarusian schooling, discriminated against the Belarusian language, and imposed the Polish national identity on Roman Catholics in Belarus.

In January 1921, the starosta from Wilejka wrote of the popular mood as being one of resignation and apathy among the Western Belorussian peasants, impoverished by food requisitions by the Bolsheviks and the Polish military. He insisted that, although the new Belarusian schools were 'springing up everywhere' in his county, they harbored anti-Polish attitudes.

In 1928 there were 69 schools with Belarusian language in Western Belorussia; the attendance was minimal due in part to lower quality of instruction. The first-ever textbook of Belarusian grammar was written only around 1918. In 1939, over 90% of children in Poland attended school. As elsewhere, the educational systems promoted Polish language there also. Meanwhile, the Belarusian agitators deported to the USSR from Poland were put in prison by the Soviet NKVD as bourgeois nationalists.

Most Polish inhabitants of the region supported the policy of cultural assimilation of Belarusians as proposed by Dmowski. The polonization drive was inspired and influenced by Dmowski's Polish National Democracy, who advocated refusing Belarusians and Ukrainians the right of free national development. Władysław Studnicki, an influential Polish official, stated that Poland's engagement in the East amounts to a much needed economic colonization. Belarusian nationalist media was pressured and censored by the Polish authorities.

Belarusians were divided along religious lines with roughly 70% being Orthodox and 30% Roman Catholic. According to Russian sources, discrimination was targeting assimilation of Eastern Orthodox Belarusians. The Polish church authorities promoted Polish in Orthodox services, and initiated the creation of the Polish Orthodox Societies in four cities including Slonim, Białystok, Vawkavysk, and Novogrodek. The Belarusian Roman Catholic priest Fr. Vincent Hadleŭski who promoted Belarusian in church, and Belarusian national awareness, was under pressure by his Polish counterparts. The Polish Catholic Church in Western Belorussia issued documents to priests about the usage of the Belarusian language rather than Polish language in Churches and Catholic Sunday Schools. The Warsaw-published instruction of the Polish Catholic Church from 1921 criticized priests preaching in Belarusian at the Catholic masses.

=== Hramada ===
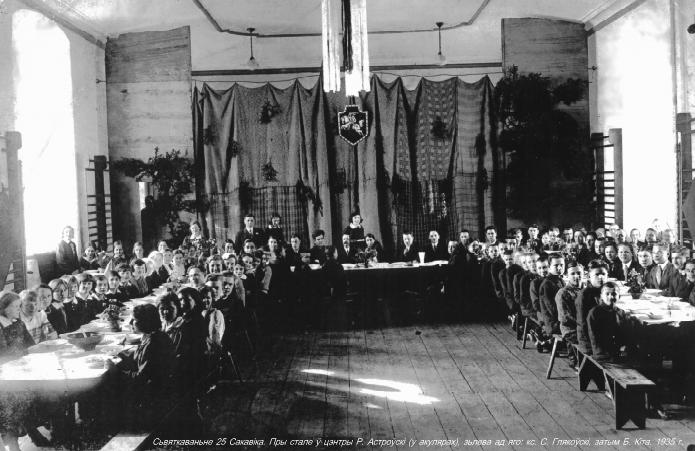
Children gathered at the dining hall of the Belarusian Gymnasium of Vilnia, Poland, 1935

Compared to the (larger) Ukrainian minority living in Poland, Belarusians were much less politically aware and active. The largest Belarusian political organization was the Belarusian Peasants' and Workers' Union, also referred to as the Hramada. Hramada received logistical help from the Soviet Union and the Communist International and served as a cover for the radical and subversive Communist Party of Western Belorussia. It was therefore banned by the Polish authorities, its leaders sentenced to various terms in prison and then deported to the USSR, where they were killed by the Soviet regime.

Tensions between the increasingly nationalistic Polish government and various increasingly separatist ethnic minorities continued to grow, and the Belarusian minority was no exception. Likewise, according to Marek Jan Chodakiewicz, the USSR considered Poland to be "enemy number one". During the Great Purge, the Polish National District at Dzyarzhynsk was disbanded and the Soviet NKVD undertook the so-called "Polish Operation" (from approximately 25 August 1937, to 15 November 1938) – where the Poles in East Belorussia, i.e. BSSR, were deported and executed. The operation caused the deaths of up to 250,000 people – out of an official ethnic Polish population of 636,000 – as a result of political murder, disease or starvation. Amongst these, at least 111,091 members of the Polish minority were shot by NKVD troika. According to Bogdan Musiał, many were murdered in prison executions. In addition, several hundred thousand ethnic Poles from Belarus and Ukraine were deported to other parts of the Soviet Union.

The Soviets also promoted the Soviet-controlled BSSR as formally autonomous to attract Belarusians living in Poland. This image was attractive to many Western Belorussian national leaders, and some of them, like Frantsishak Alyakhnovich or Uładzimir Žyłka emigrated from Poland to the BSSR, but very soon became victims of Soviet repression.

== Demographics ==
The table below shows a comparison of the number of Belarusians and the number of Poles in Western Belarus based on the 1931 census (questions about mother tongue and religion). Belarusian/Poleshuk("Tutejszy")/Russian and Orthodox/Greek Catholic plurality or majority counties are highlighted with yellow, while Polish and Roman Catholic plurality or majority counties are highlighted with pink:

Belarusian and Polish population in voivodeships with significant Belarusian population according to the 1931 census
Today part of	County part of Voivodeship	County	Pop.	Belarusian, Poleshuk & Russian	%	Polish	%	Orthodox & Uniate	%	Roman Catholic	%
(Belarus) (Lithuania)	Wilno	Braslaw	143161	37689	26.3%	93958	65.6%	29713	20.8%	89020	62.2%
(Belarus)	Wilno	Dzisna	159886	85051	53.2%	62282	39.0%	88118	55.1%	56895	35.6%
(Belarus)	Wilno	Molodechno	91285	49747	54.5%	35523	38.9%	63074	69.1%	21704	23.8%
(Belarus)	Wilno	Oshmyany	104612	11064	10.6%	84951	81.2%	15125	14.5%	81369	77.8%
(Belarus)	Wilno	Pastavy	99907	49071	49.1%	47917	48.0%	44477	44.5%	50751	50.8%
(Lithuania) (Belarus)	Wilno	Švenčionys	136475	16814	12.3%	68441	50.1%	1978	1.4%	117524	86.1% (Note: This share of Roman Catholics included 42,993 Roman Catholic Lithuanians or around 31.5% of the county's total population.)
(Belarus)	Wilno	Vilyeyka	131070	65220	49.8%	59477	45.4%	70664	53.9%	53168	40.6%
(Lithuania) (Belarus)	Wilno	Vilnius-Trakai	214472	9263	4.3%	180546	84.2%	2988	1.4%	201053	93.7%
(Lithuania)	Wilno	Vilnius City	195071	9109	4.7%	128628	65.9%	9598	4.9%	125999	64.6%
Total in Wilno Voivodeship			1275939	333028	26.1%	761723	59.7%	325735	25.5%	797483	62.5%
(Belarus)	Nowogródek	Baranavichy	161038	70627	43.9%	74916	46.5%	99118	61.5%	45126	28.0%
(Belarus)	Nowogródek	Lida	183485	20538	11.2%	145609	79.4%	23025	12.5%	144627	78.8%
(Belarus)	Nowogródek	Nyasvizh	114464	77094	67.4%	27933	24.4%	82245	71.9%	22378	19.6%
(Belarus)	Nowogródek	Novogrudok	149536	103783	69.4%	35084	23.5%	109162	73.0%	28796	19.3%
(Belarus)	Nowogródek	Slonim	126510	63445	50.2%	52313	41.4%	89724	70.9%	23817	18.8%
(Belarus)	Nowogródek	Stowbtsy	99389	40875	41.1%	51820	52.1%	54076	54.4%	37856	38.1%
(Belarus)	Nowogródek	Shchuchyn	107203	10658	9.9%	89462	83.5%	38900	36.3%	60097	56.1%
(Belarus)	Nowogródek	Valozhyn	115522	33240	28.8%	76722	66.4%	47923	41.5%	61852	53.5%
Total in Nowogródek Voivodeship			1057147	420260	39.8%	553859	52.4%	544173	51.5%	424549	40.2%
(Belarus)	Polesie	Brest	215927	115323	53.4%	50248	23.3%	135911	62.9%	43020	19.9%
(Belarus)	Polesie	Drahichyn	97040	81557	84.0%	6844	7.1%	83147	85.7%	5699	5.9%
(Belarus) (Ukraine)	Polesie	Kamin-Kashyrskyi (Note: Kamin-Kashyrskyi County's population according to the 1921 census included 41,522 Ukrainians, 9,183 Poleshuks ("Tutejszy") and just 6 Belarusians. According to the 1931 census this county's population included 74,313 Poleshuk ("Tutejszy" language), 8,271 Ukrainian, 1,136 Belarusian and 250 Russian speakers.)	94988	75699	79.7%	6692	7.0%	83113	87.5%	6026	6.3%
(Belarus)	Polesie	Kobryn	113972	71435	62.7%	10040	8.8%	93426	82.0%	8973	7.9%
(Belarus)	Polesie	Kosava	83696	68769	82.2%	8456	10.1%	68941	82.4%	7810	9.3%
(Belarus)	Polesie	Luninyets	108663	83769	77.1%	16535	15.2%	85728	78.9%	13754	12.7%
(Belarus)	Polesie	Pinsk	184305	128787	69.9%	29077	15.8%	140022	76.0%	16465	8.9%
(Belarus)	Polesie	Pruzhany	108583	81032	74.6%	17762	16.4%	82015	75.5%	16311	15.0%
(Belarus) (Ukraine)	Polesie	Stolin	124765	92253	73.9%	18452	14.8%	105280	84.4%	6893	5.5%
Total in Polesie Voivodeship			1131939	798624	70.6%	164106	14.5%	877583	77.5%	124951	11.0%
(Poland)	Białystok	Augustów	74751	1582	2.1%	68674	91.9%	875	1.2%	67821	90.7%
(Poland)	Białystok	Białystok City	91101	3781	4.2%	46386	50.9%	7628	8.4%	41493	45.5%
(Poland)	Białystok	Białystok County	140078	11465	8.2%	116709	83.3%	22035	15.7%	105685	75.4%
(Poland)	Białystok	Bielsk Podlaski	202410	70356	34.8%	111377	55.0%	91749	45.3%	91215	45.1%
(Belarus) (Lithuania)	Białystok	Grodno	213105	69832	32.8%	101089	47.4%	87205	40.9%	89122	41.8% (Note: This share of Roman Catholics included 6,246 Roman Catholic Lithuanians or just over 2.9% of the county's total population.)
(Poland)	Białystok	Łomża	168167	129	0.1%	146308	87.0%	295	0.2%	145230	86.4%
(Poland)	Białystok	Ostrołęka	112587	49	0.0%	104341	92.7%	166	0.1%	103871	92.3%
(Poland)	Białystok	Ostrów Mazowiecka	99741	60	0.1%	85925	86.1%	160	0.2%	85540	85.8%
(Poland)	Białystok	Sokółka	103135	2107	2.0%	92816	90.0%	13329	12.9%	81030	78.6%
(Poland)	Białystok	Suwałki	110124	6289	5.7%	85707	77.8%	1519	1.4%	87350	79.3%
(Poland)	Białystok	Szczuczyn	68215	117	0.2%	60935	89.3%	200	0.3%	60763	89.1%
(Belarus)	Białystok	Volkovysk	171327	74823	43.7%	83111	48.5%	80621	47.1%	76373	44.6%
(Poland)	Białystok	Wysokie Mazowieckie	89103	148	0.2%	78881	88.5%	376	0.4%	78584	88.2%
Total in Białystok Voivodeship			1643844	240738	14.6%	1182259	71.9%	306158	18.6%	1114077	67.8%
Total in four voivodeships			5108869	1792650	35.1%	2661947	52.1%	2053649	40.2%	2461060	48.2%

== Soviet invasion of Poland, 1939 ==
Animated map of the 1939 invasion of Poland. Soviet order of battle marked in dark pink.

Soon after the Nazi-Soviet invasion of Poland following the Nazi–Soviet Pact, the area of Western Belorussia was formally annexed into the Belarusian Soviet Socialist Republic (BSSR). The Soviet secret police NKVD, aided by the Red Army, organized staged elections which were decided in the atmosphere of intimidation and state terror. The Soviet occupational administration held the elections on 22 October 1939, less than two weeks after the invasion. The citizens were threatened repeatedly that their deportations to Siberia were imminent. The ballot envelopes were numbered to remain traceable and usually handed over already sealed. The referendum was rigged. By design, the candidates were unknown to their constituencies which were brought to the voting stations by armed guards. The so-called Elections to the People's Assemblies of Western Ukraine and Western Belorussia were conducted in Russian.

On 30 October, the People's Assembly session held in Belastok (Polish Białystok) affirmed the Soviet decision to join the Belarusian Soviet Socialist Republic (BSSR) with the USSR. Nevertheless, the unification voting in the People's Assembly of Western Belorussia was not fully successful during the first attempt because 10 Lithuanians, who were elected to the People's Assembly of Western Belorussia, initially voted against the unification of Western Belorussia with the Belarusian SSR and explained that they instead want to unite with Lithuania, thus the voting had to be repeated and eventually succeeded. The petition was officially accepted by the Supreme Soviet of the USSR on 2 November and by the Supreme Soviet of the BSSR on 12 November 1939. From then on, all citizens of Poland but also born in Poland would find themselves living in the Byelorussian SSR as the Soviet subjects, without the recognition of their Polish citizenship.

The Soviet propaganda portrayed the Soviet invasion of Poland as the "reunion of Western Belorussia and Ukraine". Many ethnic Belarusians and Jews welcomed unification with the BSSR. Mostly wealthy groups of citizens changed their attitude after experiencing firsthand the style of the Soviet system.

=== Deportations, arrests, and the reign of terror ===
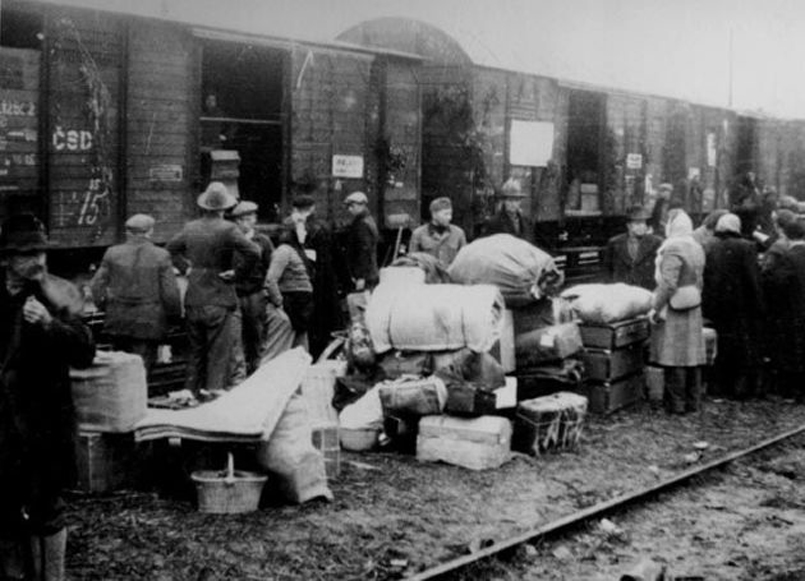
Polish families deported to Siberia after the Soviet annexation of the eastern regions of the Second Polish Republic.

The Soviets quickly began confiscating, nationalizing, and redistributing all private and state-owned property. During the two years following the annexation, the Soviets arrested approximately 100,000 Polish citizens across Kresy. Due to a lack of access to the secret Soviet and Belarusian archives, for many years after the war the estimates of the number of Polish citizens deported to Siberia from the areas of Western Belorussia, as well as the number who perished under Soviet rule, were only estimated. In August 2009, on the occasion of the 70th anniversary of the Soviet invasion, the authoritative Polish Institute of National Remembrance announced that its researchers reduced the estimate of the number of people deported to Siberia to 320,000 in total. Some 150,000 Polish citizens perished under Soviet rule. The majority of Lithuanians in Belarus intelligentsia and communists were also repressed.

== The Soviet–German War 1941–1945 ==
The terms of the Molotov–Ribbentrop Pact signed earlier in Moscow were soon broken, when the German Army entered the Soviet occupation zone on 22 June 1941. After Operation Barbarossa, most of Western Belorussia became part of the German Reichskommissariat Ostland (RKO), as the so-called Generalbezirk Weißruthenien (General Region of White Ruthenia). Many ethnic Belarusians supported Nazi Germany. By the end of 1942, sworn Germanophile Ivan Yermachenka formed the pro-Nazi BNS organization with 30,000 members. The Belarusian Auxiliary Police was formed. Known to the Germans as the Schutzmannschaft, the ethnic Belarusian police played an indispensable role in the Holocaust in Belarus, notably during the second wave of the ghetto liquidations, starting in February–March 1942.

In 1945, the Big Three, Great Britain, the United States and the Soviet Union, established new borders for Poland. Most of Western Belarus remained part of the BSSR after the end of World War II in Europe; only the region around Białystok (Belostok) was to be returned to Poland. The Polish population was soon forcibly resettled west. The Western Belorussia, in its entirety, was incorporated into the BSSR.

It was initially planned to move the capital of the BSSR to Vilna. However, the same year Joseph Stalin ordered that the city and surrounding region be transferred to Lithuania, which some months later was annexed by the Soviet Union and became a new Soviet Republic. Minsk, therefore, remained the capital of the enlarged BSSR. The borders of the BSSR were again altered somewhat after the war (notably the area around the city of Białystok (Belastok Region) was returned to Poland). Still, in general, they coincide with the borders of the modern Republic of Belarus.

=== Sovietization ===
Residents of a town in Eastern Poland (now Western Belorussia) assembled to greet the arrival of the Red Army during the Soviet invasion of Poland in 1939. The Russian text reads "Long Live the great theory of Marx, Engels, Lenin-Stalin". Such welcomings were organized by the activists of the Communist Party of West Belarus affiliated with the Communist Party of Poland, delegalized in both countries by 1938.

The Belarusian political parties and the society in Western Belorussia often lacked information about repressions in the Soviet Union and was under a strong influence of Soviet propaganda. Because of bad economic conditions and national discrimination of Belarusian in Poland, much of the population of Western Belorussia welcomed the annexation by the USSR.

However, soon after the annexation of Western Belorussia by the Soviet Union, the Belarusian political activists had no illusions as to the friendliness of the Soviet regime. The population grew less loyal as the economic conditions became even worse and as the new regime carried out mass repressions and deportations that targeted Belarusians as well as ethnic Poles.

Immediately after the annexation, the Soviet authorities carried out the nationalization of agricultural land owned by large landowners in Western Belorussia. Collectivization and the creation of collective farms (kolkhoz) was planned to be carried out at a slower pace than in Eastern Belorussia in the 1920s. By 1941, in the western regions of the BSSR, the number of individual farms decreased only by 7%; 1115 collective farms were created. At the same time, pressure and even repressions against larger farmers (called by the Soviet propaganda, kulaki) began: the size of agricultural land for one individual farm was limited to 10ha, 12ha and 14ha depending on the quality of the land. It was forbidden to hire workers and lease land.

Under the Soviet occupation, the Western Belorussian citizenry, particularly the Poles, faced a "filtration" procedure by the NKVD apparatus, which resulted in over 100,000 people being forcibly deported to eastern parts of the Soviet Union (e.g. Siberia) in the very first wave of expulsions. In total, during the next two years some 1.7 million Polish citizens were put on freight trains and sent from the Polish Kresy to labour camps in the Gulag.

== Republic of Belarus ==
The majority of Poles live in the Western regions, including 230,000 in the Grodno oblast. In addition, Sapotskin and its selsoviet have a Polish majority. The largest Polish organization in Belarus is the Union of Poles in Belarus (Związek Polaków na Białorusi), with over 20,000 members.

== See also ==
- Western Ukraine
- Soviet raid on Stołpce
- Border Protection Corps
- Sergey Pritytsky
