= Nowogródek Voivodeship (1919–1939) =

Former voivodeship of Poland

Coordinates: 53°00′N 25°00′E

Nowogródek Voivodeship Województwo nowogródzkie
- Voivodeship of Poland
- 1921–1939
- Coat of arms

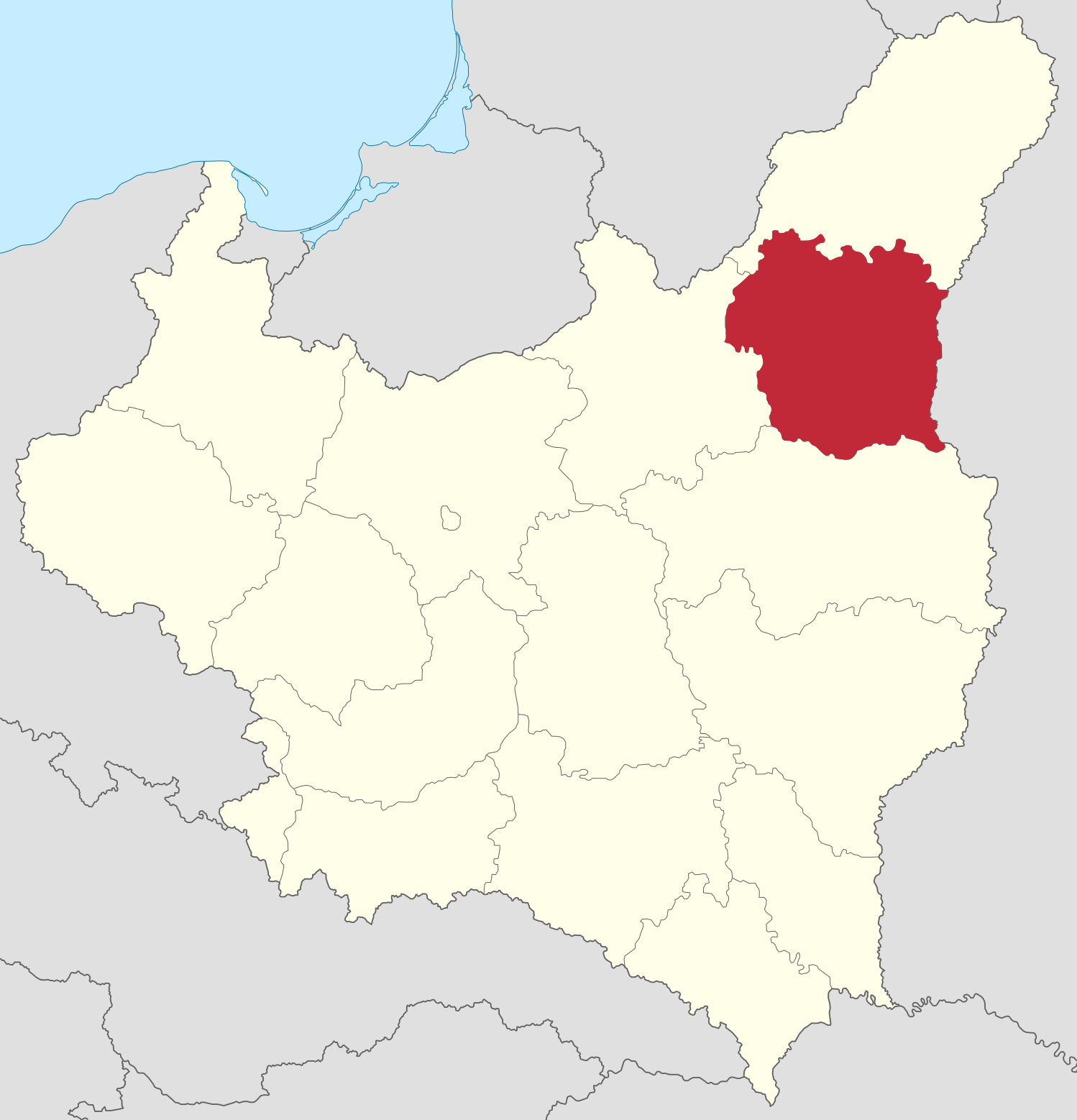
- Nowogródek Voivodeship (red) on the map of Second Polish Republic
- Capital: Nowogródek
- Area
  - 1939: 22,966 km^{2} (8,867 sq mi)
- Population
  - 1921: 822,106
  - 1931: 1,057,000
- Government
  - Type: Voivodeship
- Voivodes
  - Jun-Oct 1921: Czesław Krupski
  - 1935-1939: Adam Korwin-Sokołowski
- Historical era: Interwar period
  - Established: 14 February 1921
  - Invasion: 17 September 1939
  - Voting and annexation: October–November 1939
- Political subdivisions: 8 powiats and 8 cities
Preceded by	Succeeded by
Nowogródek District	Navahrudak Region; Republic of Lithuania (1918-1940)
- Today part of: Belarus, Lithuania

Nowogródek Voivodeship (Polish: Województwo nowogródzkie) was a unit of administrative division of the Second Polish Republic between 1921 and 1939, with the capital in Nowogródek (now Navahrudak, Belarus). Following German and Soviet Invasion of Poland of September 1939, Poland's borders were redrawn in accordance with the Molotov–Ribbentrop Pact. The Nowogródek Voivodeship was incorporated into the Byelorussian Soviet Socialist Republic in an atmosphere of terror, following staged elections. With the end of World War II, at the insistence of Joseph Stalin at the Tehran Conference of 1943, the area remained in Soviet hands, and the Polish population was soon forcibly resettled. Since 1991, most part of it belongs to the sovereign Republic of Belarus.

== Location and area ==
The voivodeship covered 22,966 km^{2} (8,867 sq mi). It was located in north-eastern part of the country, bordering Soviet Union to the east, Białystok Voivodeship to the west, Polesie Voivodeship to the south and Wilno Voivodeship to the north. The landscape was flat and heavily wooded, lying within the Neman River basin.

== Population ==
Nowogródek Voivodeship consisted of 8 cities, 8 powiats (districts) subdivided further into futory and kolonie, and 89 villages. The Polish census of 1921 data reveals that the voivodeship was inhabited by 800,761 people, and the population density was 35.3 persons per km^{2}. A decade later, the Polish census of 1931 results showed a steady increase in population at 1,057,200 inhabitants, of whom 82% were engaged in agricultural activities. In 1921, 55% of persons over the age of 10 were illiterate due to repressive policies of the Russian Empire. In the reborn Polish Republic, the number of public schools greatly increased, and the illiteracy dropped to 35% by 1931.

The Polish government conducted two official surveys 10 years apart in order to determine the economic and minority status of the country. Both censuses asked respondents for their religious affiliations. The ethnic composition findings have been disputed especially after World War II. The 1921 census in accordance with guidelines of the 1918 League of Nations Minority Treaties, asked about nationality prompting many respondents of different ethnic backgrounds living in Poland, to declare Polish by default. The 1931 census replaced this question with a more specific one regarding the respondents' "mother tongue" which in turn, prompted many respondents to simply call it "local".

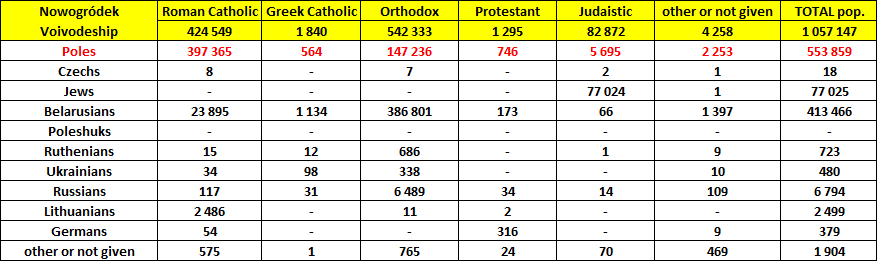
Linguistic and religious structure of the Nowogródek Voivodeship according to the 1931 census

According to the published and official results of 1931 Polish census, of the 1,057,147 inhabitants of the Nowogródek Voivodeship, 553,859 spoke Polish, 413,466 spoke Belarusian, 69,782 spoke Yiddish, 7,243 spoke Hebrew, 6,794 spoke Russian, and 2,499 spoke Lithuanian. The remainder spoke Ukrainian, Rusyn, German, Czech and others. In percentage points this translates into an estimate of 53% of the population who identified their mother tongue as Polish, 39% as Belarusian, 7% as Yiddish and 1% as Russian. According to assessment by Tadeusz Piotrowski (1998) the census recorded the number of Poles as greater only because the language spoken wasn't defined unambiguously, thus quoting figures adjusted by Jerzy Tomaszewski (1985) as follows: the Nowogródek Voivodeship was home to about 616,000 ethnic Belarusians, or 38% of the total population of Polish lands later annexed by Stalin. The number of ethnic Belarusians (including tutejsi) exceeded the number of ethnic Poles by eight percentage points according to him. Similarly, the Jewish population statistics were allegedly reduced by about 4% in the actual number of dependants. The chairman of the Polish census statistical office, Edward Szturm de Sztrem stated after World War II that the returned forms might have been tampered with by the executive power, but to what extent is not known. Jerzy Tomaszewski categorizes the largest non-Polish component as Belarusian and Ukrainian at 58.37% combined; and 7.85% as Jewish (as quoted by Teichova & Matis).

The results of the 1931 census (questions about mother tongue and about religion) are presented in the table below:

Belarusian and Orthodox/Uniate majority minority counties are highlighted with yellow.

Linguistic (mother tongue) and religious structure of the Nowogródek Voivodeship according to the 1931 census
County	Pop.	Polish	Belarusian	Yiddish & Hebrew	Russian	Lithuanian	Other language	Roman Catholic	Orthodox & Uniate	Jewish	Other religion
Baranavichy	161038	46.5%	42.6%	9.3%	1.2%	0.0%	0.4%	28.0%	61.5%	10.0%	0.5%
Lida	183485	79.4%	10.8%	7.9%	0.4%	1.3%	0.2%	78.8%	12.5%	8.1%	0.6%
Nyasvizh	114464	24.4%	66.6%	7.6%	0.7%	0.0%	0.7%	19.6%	71.9%	7.8%	0.7%
Novogrudok	149536	23.5%	68.8%	6.9%	0.6%	0.0%	0.2%	19.3%	73.0%	7.0%	0.7%
Slonim	126510	41.4%	49.4%	8.0%	0.8%	0.0%	0.4%	18.8%	70.9%	9.8%	0.5%
Stowbtsy	99389	52.1%	40.5%	6.4%	0.6%	0.0%	0.4%	38.1%	54.4%	7.0%	0.5%
Shchuchyn	107203	83.5%	9.7%	6.3%	0.3%	0.0%	0.2%	56.1%	36.3%	7.4%	0.2%
Valozhyn	115522	66.4%	28.3%	4.6%	0.5%	0.0%	0.2%	53.5%	41.5%	4.6%	0.4%
Nowogródek Voivodeship	1057147	52.4%	39.1%	7.3%	0.6%	0.2%	0.4%	40.2%	51.5%	7.8%	0.5%

== Cities and counties ==
The historical town of Nowogródek was the smallest of all voivodeship’s capitals in Poland, with population of almost 10,000 (as of 1939). The area’s largest city was the key railroad junction of Baranowicze, which grew quickly during the 1930s. Its 1931 population was almost 23,000. Other important centers of the voivodeship were Lida (in 1931 pop. 20,000), Słonim (pop. 16,000), and Nieśwież (pop. 8,000).

The division of Nowogródek voivodeship till 1929 was given in below. It was also included counties (powiats) of Duniłowicze, Dzisna (whose center was Głębokie) and Wilejka between 1921 and 1922 till they were passed to Wilno Land.

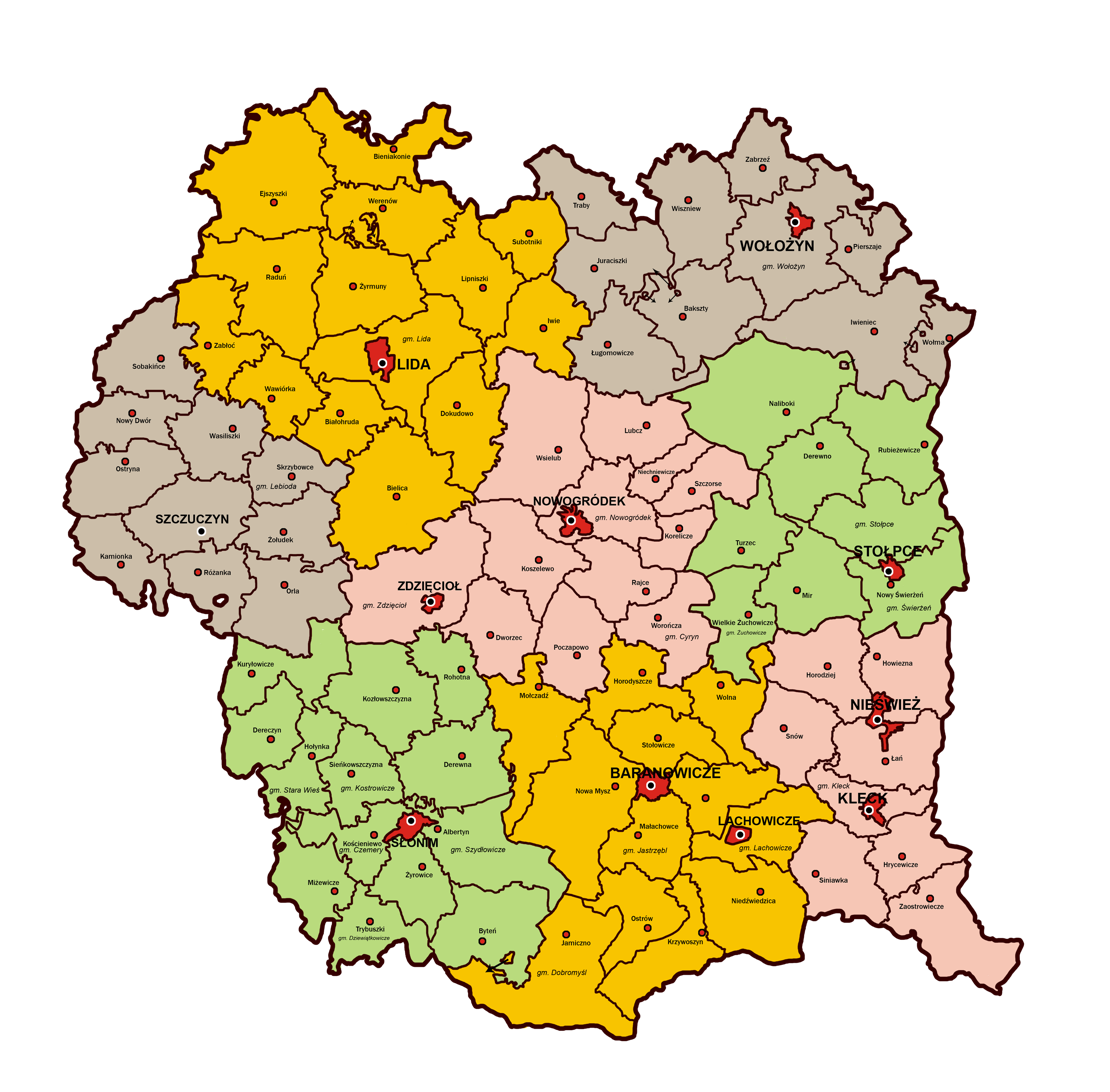
Map of Nowogródek Voivodeship, 1938

List of Counties with square area and population
#	Name	CoA	Area	Population
1	Baranowicze county		3,298 km²	161,100
2	Lida county		4,258 km²	183,500
3	Nieśwież county		1,968 km²	114,500
4	Nowogródek county		2,930 km²	149,500
5	Słonim county		3,069 km²	126,500
6	Stołpce county		2,371 km²	99,400
7	Szczuczyn county		2,273 km²	107,200
8	Wołożyn county		2,799 km²	115,500

Country of Szczuczyn was created from gmina of Kamionka in of Grodno County in Bialystok voivodeship and gminas of Dziembrów, Lebioda, Nowy Dwór, Orla, Ostryna, Różanka, Sobakińce, Szczuczyn, Wasiliszki and Żołudek in Lida County on 21 March 1929.

== Railroads and industry ==
The Russian rule during the Partitions of Poland (ending in 1918), left Nowogródek in the state of economic collapse. Roads and means of communication were destroyed, along with most of industry. Large part of population was poor, with the lingering high level of illiteracy and low level of agricultural production. Railroad network was scarce (total length was only 713 kilometers, or 3.1 per 100 km²), with only two junctions: at Baranowicze and Lida. Nowogródek itself was not located on any main rail connections, it was reachable only by narrow-gauge track. In the interwar period Nowogródek remained chiefly an agricultural province. Medium-sized industrial enterprises included mills, milk processing plants, tar and turpentine factories, brickyards, sawmills, soft drinks factories, tanneries and distilleries. Wood processing and wood-based manufacture were the most important in the region; employing 35.6% of the total number of workers. By 1934 there was a sawmill in every county (gmina), more than half of them with 20–100 employees.

Food industry was well developed in the voivodeship. It was dominated by small businesses meeting the needs of the local population, with the major meat processing plant at Baranowicze. In 1934, there were 611 flour mills in the province, milling rye (65%), barley (13%), wheat (7%) and other cereals. There were 227 milk processing plants, 72 labels of soft drinks, 24 distilleries, 6 fruit drying plants, 5 wineries and honey packers, 4 vinegar factories, 4 starch manufacturers, 3 industrial smoke-houses, 2 breweries, 2 spirit rectification plants as well as drying and processing plant with medicinal herbs. Metal industry was represented by 6 companies. In Lida there were 2 factories of agricultural machinery and a factory of wire and nails. The equipment for mills was produced by mechanical workshops in Baranowicze, with additional two repair shops. Glassworks "Neman" was the biggest industrial facility in Nowogródek and anywhere in the north-eastern part of Kresy. Also, there were 9 tile factories already in 1934, including 6 large ones, employing up to 70 workers in season. The 71 brick factories were mostly small, with 10 large ones, producing mainly for the local market, because rail transport was not profitable enough. Also, there were 36 concrete plants in the province in mid 1930s. Further economic development of Nowogródek Voivodeship was abruptly halted by the war.

== Voivodes ==
- Czesław Krupski June 1921 – 17 October 1921 (acting)
- Władysław Raczkiewicz 17 October 1921 – 29 August 1924
- Marian Żegota-Januszajtis 29 August 1924 – 24 August 1926
- Vacant 24 August 1926 – 24 September 1926
- Zygmunt Beczkowicz 24 September 1926 – 20 June 1931
- Wacław Kostek-Biernacki 1 July 1931 – 8 September 1932
- Stefan Świderski 8 September 1932 – 2 December 1935 (acting to 1933)
- Adam Korwin-Sokołowski 17 December 1935 – 17 September 1939

== September 1939 and its aftermath ==
On September 17, 1939, following German aggression on Poland and Molotov–Ribbentrop Pact, Soviet forces invaded eastern Poland. As bulk of Polish Army was concentrated in the west, fighting Germans, the Soviets met with little resistance and their troops quickly moved westwards, occupying Voivodeship’s area with ease.

After the Polish Defensive War of 1939 the area was occupied by the Soviet Union, and then (after 1941) by Germany. After World War II the area was annexed by the Soviet union, and most was incorporated into the Byelorussian SSR. This led to the loss of villages like Dziarečyn, which had large Jewish populations prior to the Holocaust. The northern part of the former Lida county, including the town of Ejszyszki (now Eišiškės) became part of Lithuania.

== Notes and references ==
Citations

Bibliography

- Maly rocznik statystyczny 1939, Nakladem Glownego Urzedu Statystycznego, Warszawa 1939 (Concise Statistical Year-Book of Poland, Warsaw 1939).

== See also ==
- Belarus's current Grodno Region
- Defiance (2008 film)
- Tuvia Bielski
- Witold Pilecki
- Adolf Pilch
- Nowogródek Voivodeship (1507–1795)
