= Molodechno Region =

Former region of the Byelorussian Soviet Socialist Republic

Molodechno Region Belarusian: Маладзечанская вобласць Russian: Молодечненская область
- Region of the Byelorussian Soviet Socialist Republic
- 1944–1960
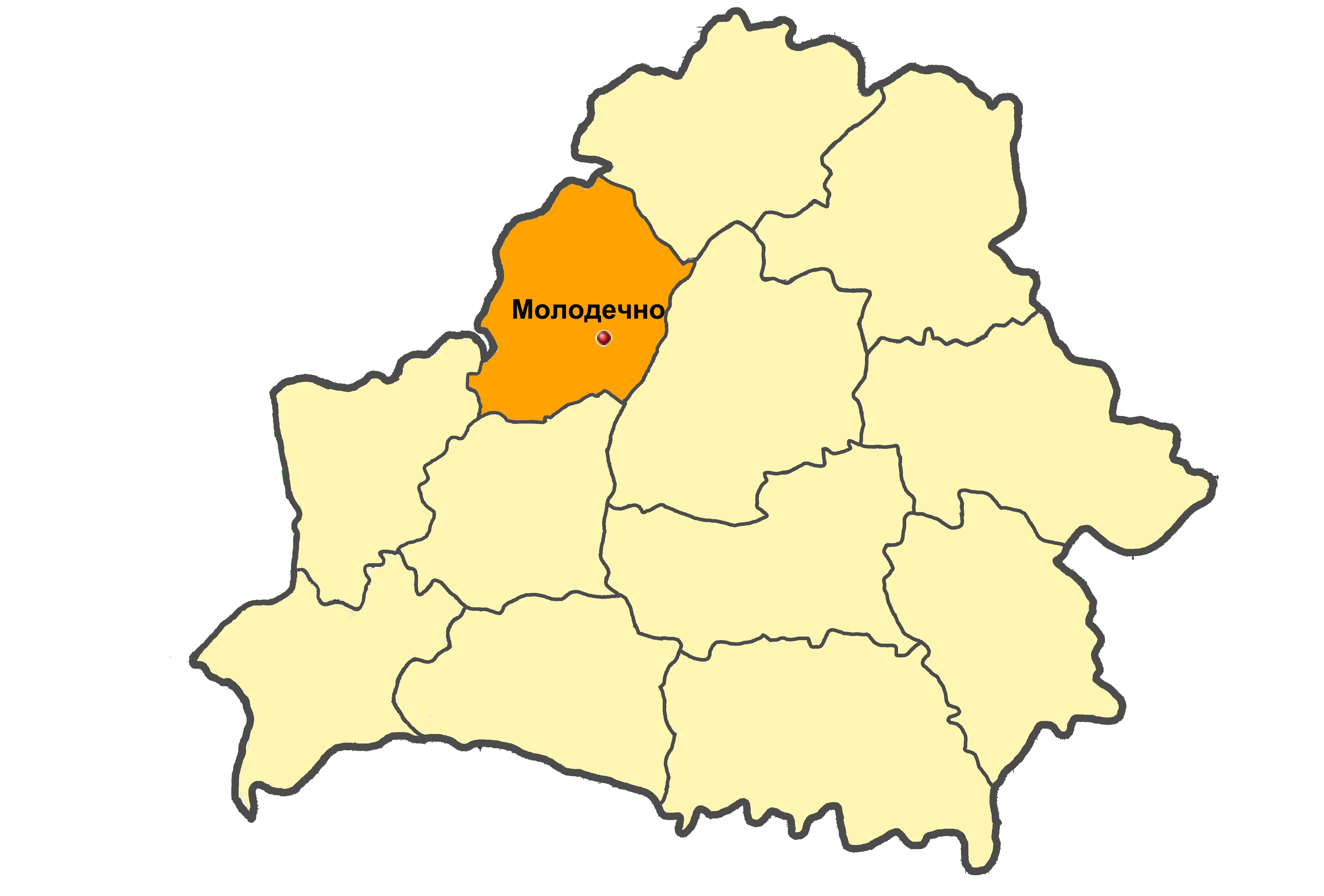
- Map of Molodechno Region within the Byelorussian SSR
- Capital: Maladzyechna
- Area
  - Coordinates: 54°19′N 26°51′E
  - 1959: 24,300 km^{2} (9,400 sq mi)
- Population
  - 1959: 848,000
- History
  - Established: 20 September 1944
  - Disestablished: 20 January 1960
- Political subdivisions: Districts: 24
Preceded by
Vileyka Region
Succeeded by
Minsk Region
Grodno Region
Vitebsk Region

Molodechno Region, also known as Maladzyechna Region or Molodechno Oblast (Belarusian: Маладзечанская вобласць; Russian: Молодечненская область), was a region (voblasts) of the Byelorussian SSR, the first-level administration division in the republic. Initially the region was formed on 4 December 1939, following the annexation of Western Belorussia into the Byelorussian SSR from the Second Polish Republic, as Vileyka Region. However, after the liberation of Byelorussia by the Red Army in July 1944, most of the pre-war civil administration was not possible for a number of reasons, one of which was that the city of Vileyka was heavily damaged during the war, and the transportation links between it and the rest of the region were too.

However, the nearby city of Maladzyechna (Molodechno) located 20 kilometres (12 mi) away from Vileyka escaped heavy destruction, and as a result, on 20 September 1944, Maladzyechna Region was established. Initially it contained 14 districts. These districts were Astravets, Ashmyany, Volozhin, Ilya, Iwye, Krivichi, Kurenets (Its center was relocated in Vileyka and renamed as Vileyka in 1946), Molodechno, Myadzyel, Pastavy, Radashkovichy, Smarhon, Svir and Yuratishki. However, on 8 January 1954, in course of administrative-territorial reforms of the Byelorussian SSR, the neighbouring Polatsk and Baranavichy voblasts (along with others) were disestablished.

Molodechno Region incorporated 10 raions (Ivyanets from Baranavichy; Braslaw, Vidzy, Hlybokaye, Dzisna, Dokshytsy, Dunilovichi, Miory, Plisa and Sharkawshchyna from Polotsk) from the two regions with its size growing from 14.8 to 24.3 thousand square kilometres. During the same reforms, Iwye raion was passed to Grodno Region. In 1957, Ilya raion was dissolved and was attached to Vileyka. In 1959, the Dzisna and Svir raions were dissolved and were attached to Myadzyel and Miory. The number of raions of the oblast was reduced to 20. However, on 20 January 1960, Maladzyechna Region too was disestablished. Its territory, with 848 thousand people, was divided between the modern Vitebsk (raions of Braslav, Vidzy, Hlybokaye, Dokshytsy, Dunilovichi, Miory, Plisa, Pastavy and Sharkawshchyna), Grodno (raions of Ostrovets, Oshmyany, Smorgon and Yuratishki and Bogdanov village of Volozhin) and Minsk regions (raions of Maladzyechna, Vileyka, Volozhin (except Bogdanov village), Ivyanets, Kryvichi, Myadzyel and Radashkovichy), with the city of Maladzyechna being incorporated into the latter. This turned out to be the last of the administrative division reforms in Belarus, and since then, the borders of the regions remain today.
