= Navahrudak Region =

Former region of the Byelorussian Soviet Socialist Republic

Navahrudak Region Navahrudak Voblasts Novogrudak Oblast Belarusian: Навагрудская вобласць Russian: Новогрудская область
- Region of Byelorussian SSR
- 1939
- Capital: Navahrudak
- History
  - Established: 2 November 1939
  - Administrative centre moved to Baranovichi: 4 December 1939
- Political subdivisions: 25 districts
Preceded by	Succeeded by
Nowogródek Voivodeship (1919–1939)	Baranavichy Region

Navahrudak Region, also Navahrudak Voblasts or Novogrudak Oblast (Belarusian: Навагрудская вобласць, Russian: Новогрудская область) was a Region of the Byelorussian SSR following the Soviet annexation of Western Belorussia in 1939. The Region was formed on 2 November 1939, out of parts of the former Nowogródek Voivodeship in the Second Polish Republic.

The Sovietisation of the territory divided it into 25 districts. However as the city was on the edge of the region, immediately a decision was made to move the administrative centre from Navahrudak to Baranavichy which took place in on 4 December 1939. The Baranavichy Region survived the Second World War and was disestablished on 8 January 1954 between the Brest, Minsk, Molodechno, and Grodno Regions. The city of Navahrudak and its surrounding area went to the latter.
