= Elections to the People's Assemblies of Western Ukraine and Western Belorussia =

Rigged referendum in Soviet-occupied Poland, 1939

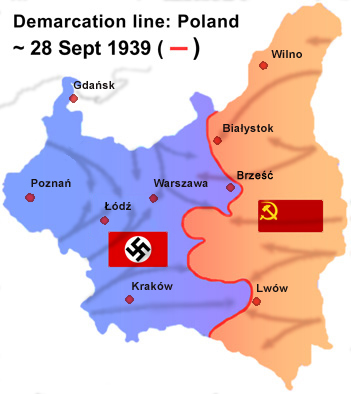
Temporary borders created by advancing German and Soviet troops. The border was soon readjusted following diplomatic agreements.

Elections to the People's Assemblies of Western Ukraine and Western Belorussia, which took place on 22 October 1939, were an attempt to legitimize the annexation of the Second Polish Republic's eastern territories by the Soviet Union following the 17 September Soviet invasion of Poland in accordance with the secret protocol of the Molotov–Ribbentrop Pact. Only one month after these lands were occupied by the Red Army, the Soviet secret police and military led by the Party officials staged the local elections in an atmosphere of state terror. The referendum was rigged. The ballot envelopes were numbered and often handed over already sealed. By design, the candidates were unknown to their constituencies which were brought to the voting stations by armed militias. The results were to become the official legitimization of the Soviet takeover of what is known today as the Western Belorussia and the Western Ukraine. Consequently, both Assemblies voted for incorporation of all formerly Polish voivodeships into the Soviet Union.

== Background ==
On 17 September 1939, the Red Army invaded eastern Poland, facing weak resistance of units of the Border Defence Corps, scattered along the border. The Soviets moved quickly westwards, towards the line of partition of Poland, established earlier, during Soviet–Nazi negotiations. After the invasion, the Second Polish Republic and Soviet Union found themselves de facto at war with each other, and Soviet authorities took advantage of the situation, to make permanent changes of the legal order of occupied territories. Their activities broke Article 43 of the 1907 Hague Convention, which states: "The authority of the legitimate power having in fact passed into the hands of the occupant, the latter shall take all the measures in his power to restore, and ensure, as far as possible, public order and safety, while respecting, unless absolutely prevented, the laws in force in the country".

As soon as the Soviets occupied Polish areas, they began organizing local governments and units of administrative division, whose borders roughly corresponded with the borders of interbellum voivodeships. Temporary authorities were made of NKVD agents, Red Army officers, local laborers, and left-wing intelligentsia. Their task was to organize the so-called workers guard in the municipal centers, and farmers committees, which were preparing land reform. Soon afterwards, these temporary authorities were replaced with Soviet-style administration and Communist Party of the Soviet Union committees. Also, NKVD apparatus took over military tasks.

After signing the German–Soviet Frontier Treaty (28 September 1939), which established the mutual border along the Bug River, the Politburo of the Central Committee of the Communist Party of the Soviet Union decided on 1 October 1939, that People's Assemblies of Western Ukraine and Western Belorussia should be called in Lviv (for Western Ukraine), and Belastok (for Western Belorussia). The task of these bodies was to urge Moscow to incorporate the land into the Soviet Union. Furthermore, a People's Assembly of Poland had been planned, for the areas around Lublin, Siedlce, and Łomża, which were to have been annexed by the Soviets. However, after some changes in the Nazi–Soviet Pact (see German–Soviet Frontier Treaty), those areas were occupied by Nazi Germany.

== The election ==
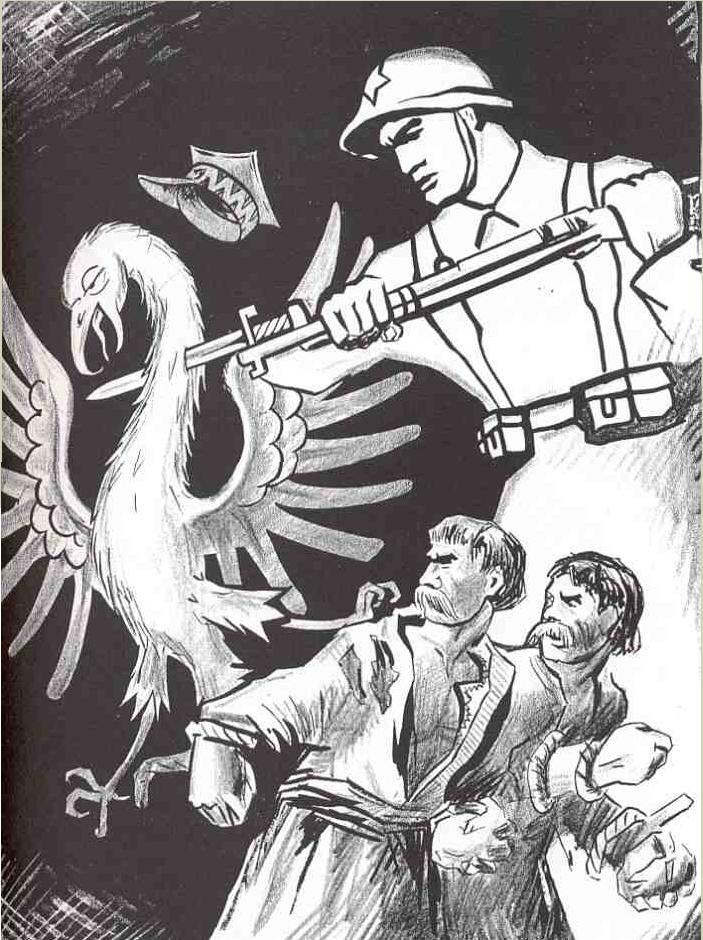
Soviet propaganda poster; the killing of the Polish Eagle in the east

The electoral campaign began on 7 October 1939, and from the beginning, was supervised by the NKVD troops. The campaign itself took place in an atmosphere of state terror, with mass arrests, and uniformed NKVD agents present at all polling stations. All candidates had been designated by the party's local peasants and workers' committees based on instructions from Moscow. It was not possible to vote for anybody else. Soviet banners and posters were seen everywhere, people were gathered to listen to propaganda slogans, and frequently, citizens were told that if they did not participate, they would be fired, arrested, and even sent to Siberia. Electoral meetings were very short. Participants were asked "who was against" the candidate offered; frightened people would not raise their hands, and then the meeting was closed. On 11 October in article published in Pravda, Soviet propaganda pointed out the issues to be solved by the Western Ukraine's Assembly. These were: establishment of Soviet authority, unification of Western Ukraine with Soviet Ukraine, confiscation of estates, and nationalization of banks and industrial properties. There were instances when local Polish Communists, especially in Western Belorussia, tried to designate their own candidates, but these attempts were immediately dismissed by the party officials.

Historian Rafal Wnuk, author of the book During the First Soviet, described the election in the city of Lviv. According to his research, on the day of the election, the city was flooded with the Soviet propaganda posters. At the polling stations, the inhabitants were able to purchase alcohol products and foods otherwise not available on the market. In some cases, people were brought by force. As Bronislawa Stachowicz from Lviv recalled:

I was forced to vote, taken from our home only in slippers and a bathrobe. I was escorted by two militiamen and an NKVD agent, who did not let me put on my coat. My mother, brother, and sister were also forced to vote.

At all voting stations, there were uniformed militia or soldiers, and names were checked on a list. Voting was monitored to such a degree that in some places people were given envelopes which had been already sealed, and told to drop them in the box. Both the campaign and the election were presented as a "great holiday of the freed people". A Polish-language newspaper "Wolna Łomża" ("Free Łomża") wrote on 22 October that "masses of Western Belorussia who had been suppressed by the Polish masters, had been waiting for this day [22 October] for almost twenty years". Another newspaper, "Nowe Życie" ("New Life") wrote: "Never before has the nation enjoyed so much freedom as now, given by the Red Army".

The results of the election show the efficiency of the Stalinist state. According to the official data, in Western Ukraine, 93% voters took part in it, and in Western Belorussia, 96%. Party candidates garnered more than 90% of the popular vote. However, in some districts (11 in Ukraine, and 2 in Belorussia), the candidates were so unpopular, that they got less than half of the votes, and it was necessary to organize a second election. Among those eligible to vote, were soldiers of the Red Army, who had invaded these provinces just five weeks before. Polish historians noted some cases of civil disobedience, which took place despite widespread terror. In Białystok, people would put in cards with slogans such as "Long live Poland, Białystok is not Belorussia". In Hrodna, slogans on the walls were painted, which said "Down with the Bolsheviks, long live Poland", and in Pinsk, high school students handed leaflets stating: "Long live Poland, down with Communists".

== People's Assemblies of Western Ukraine and Western Belorussia ==
Deputies, elected in the rigged election, formed two legislative bodies – the People's Assembly of Western Ukraine, and the People's Assembly of Western Belorussia (Russian: Народное (Национальное) собрание западной Белоруссии) on 22 October 1939, less than two weeks after the invasion. Meetings of these bodies took place respectively on 26–28 October 1939 in Lviv, and 28–30 October in Białystok. The Lviv meeting was opened by Ukrainian philology professor Kyrylo Studynskyi, and the Białystok meeting by Belarusian peasant Stsiapan Struh. Out of 926 members of the People's Assembly of Western Belorussia, there were 621 Belarusians, 127 Poles, 72 Jews, 43 Russians, 53 Ukrainians, and 10 from other nationalities. The Western Ukraine's People's Assembly had 1,482 members, out of which Poles made only 3%. Both bodies supported the establishment of Soviet rule over the occupied territories, and issued official requests to the Supreme Soviet, asking it for permission to join the already existing Byelorussian Soviet Socialist Republic and Ukrainian Soviet Socialist Republic. Nevertheless, the unification voting in the People's Assembly of Western Belorussia was not fully successful during the first attempt because 10 Lithuanians, who were elected to the People's Assembly of Western Belorussia, initially voted against the unification of Western Belorussia with Eastern Belorussia and explained that they instead want to unite with Lithuania, thus the voting had to be repeated and eventually succeeded. Also, all real estate of landowners, churches and state officials, was confiscated without compensation (including buildings and animals). Banks and larger factories were nationalized, and 17 September was established as an official holiday. Meetings of both Assemblies were based on criticism of interbellum Poland, describing "exterminational policies of White Polish occupiers, bloodsuckers and landowners", who suppressed "Ukrainian and Belarusian masses". People's Assembly of Western Ukraine wrote an official letter, which was sent to the Belorussia Assembly. Among others, it said: "We were brothers in captivity and struggle against Polish masters. Now we have become brothers in freedom and happiness. Great Red Army, fulfilling the wishes of the mighty Soviet nations, has come here and for centuries freed us, Western Ukrainians and Western Belorussians, from suppression of Polish landowners and capitalists".

On 1 November, the Supreme Soviet approved annexation of Western Ukraine, and on the next day, of Western Belorussia. On 14 November, the Supreme Soviet of Byelorussian Soviet Socialist Republic in Minsk officially annexed former territories of northeastern Poland, without the area of Wilno, which had been seized by Lithuania. On 15 November, the Supreme Soviet of Ukrainian Soviet Socialist Republic in Kiev, annexed former southeastern Poland. On 29 November, the Supreme Soviet issued a decree upon which all inhabitants of Poland living in Western Ukraine and Western Belorussia became citizens of the Soviet Union. This decision had a far-reaching consequences, because now, the NKVD apparatus had legal reasons to arrest members of prewar political parties of Poland, accusing them of Ex post facto anti-Soviet activity. Furthermore, the Supreme Soviet's decree resulted in massive draft into the Red Army. Polish historian Rafal Wnuk estimates that 210 000 inhabitants of former eastern Poland, born in 1917, 1918, and 1919, ended up in the Red Army. After official annexation of Western Ukraine and Western Belorussia, both Assemblies were dissolved.

== See also ==
- Soviet annexation of Western Ukraine, 1939–1940
- Soviet annexation of Western Belorussia
- Occupation of the Baltic states
- German–Soviet military parade in Brest-Litovsk
- Polish areas annexed by Nazi Germany
- Soviet repressions of Polish citizens (1939–1946)
- Occupation of Poland (1939–1945)
- Territories of Poland annexed by the Soviet Union
