= Polotsk Region =

Former region of the Byelorussian Soviet Socialist Republic

Polotsk Region Belarusian: Полацкая вобласць Russian: Полоцкая область
- Region of the Byelorussian SSR
- 1944–1954
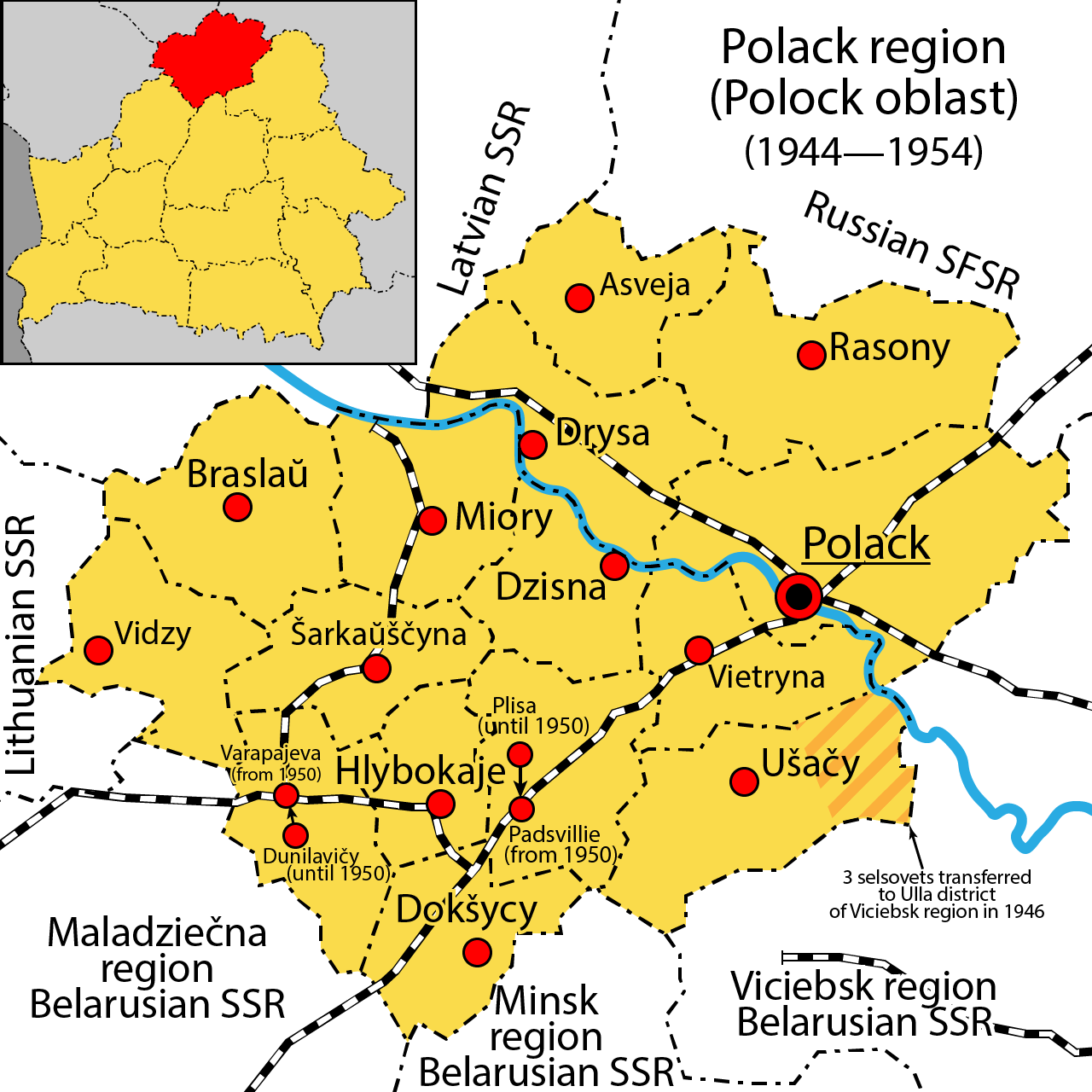
- Capital: Polotsk
- History
  - Established: 20 September 1944
  - Disestablished: 8 January 1954
- Political subdivisions: 15 districts
Preceded by	Succeeded by
Vileyka Region; Vitebsk Region	Molodechno Region; Vitebsk Region

Polotsk Region (Belarusian: Полацкая вобласць; Russian: Полоцкая область) was an administrative division in the Byelorussian SSR. It was created on 20 September 1944. It included territories of eastern Polesia and consisted of 15 districts. The administrative centre was Polotsk.

== History ==
In August 1944, there were serious considerations to transfer Polotsk and its surrounding areas (18,000 square kilometers) with ~400,000 people from the Byelorussian SSR to the Russian SFSR, however Joseph Stalin, persuaded by Panteleimon Ponomarenko, eventually rejected to approve the already prepared transferring documents and subsequently Polotsk functioned as the center of Polotsk Region between 20 September 1944 and 8 January 1954.

On 8 January 1954, the region was abolished and became part of the Vitebsk and Molodechno Regions. The city of Polotsk became part of the former.
