= Baranavichy Region =

Region of the Byelorussian SSR

Baranavichy Region Belarusian: Баранавіцкая вобласць Russian: Барановичская область
- Region of Byelorussian SSR
- 1939–1954
- Flag

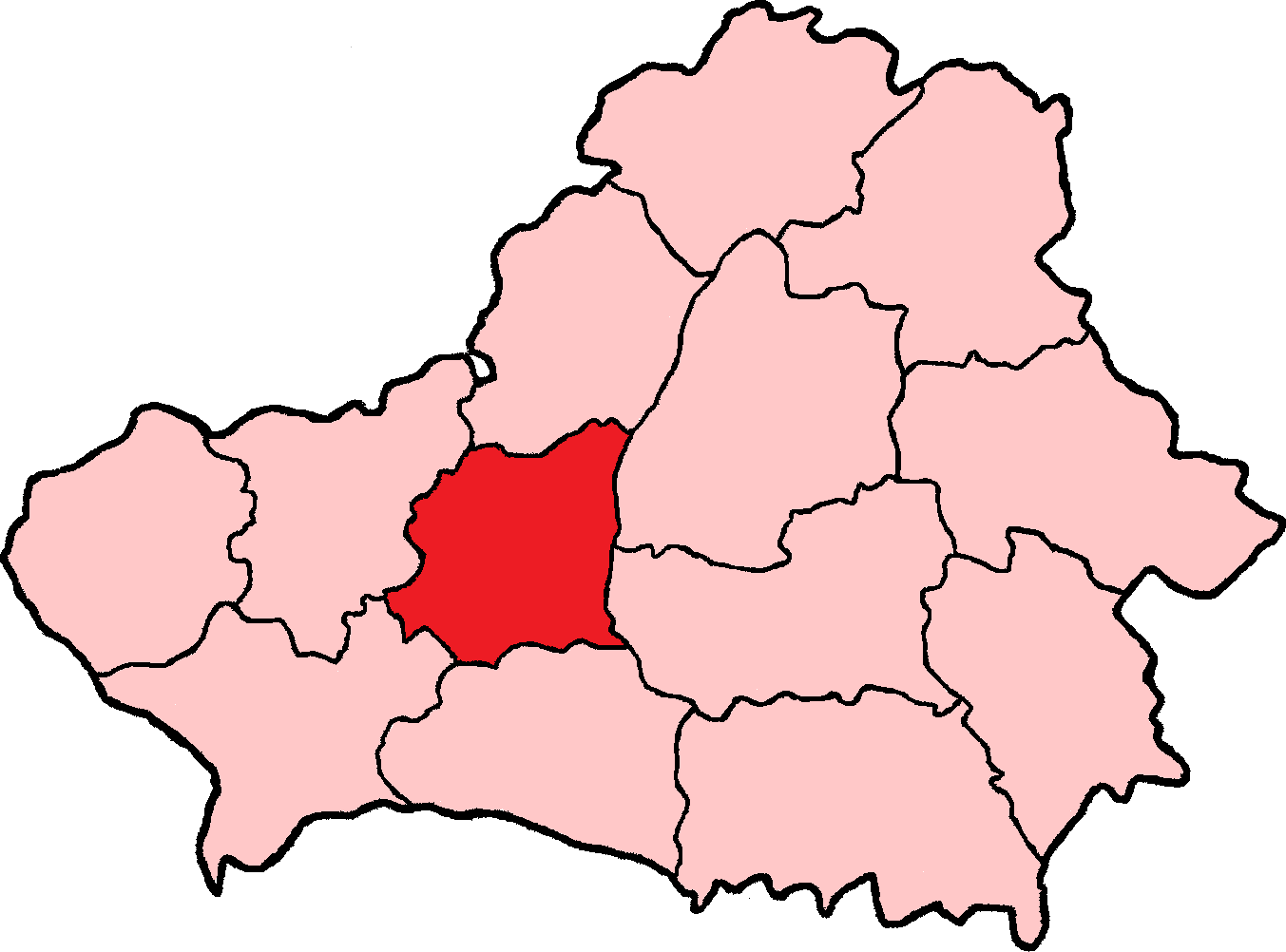
- Baranavichy Region (red) on the map of Byelorussian SSR in 1944
- Capital: Baranavichy
- Historical era: World War II
  - Established: 4 December 1939
  - Districts transferred: 1944
  - Disestablished: 8 January 1954
- Political subdivisions: 26 districts
Preceded by
Navahrudak Region
Succeeded by
Grodno Region
Molodechno Region
Brest Region
Minsk Region

Baranavichy Region, Baranavichy Voblasts, or Baranovichi Oblast (Belarusian: Баранавіцкая вобласць; Russian: Барановичская область) was a region (voblasts) of the Byelorussian SSR created after the annexation of Western Belorussia into the Byelorussian SSR in November 1939. The administrative centre of the region was the city of Baranavichy.

The region was originally known as Navahrudak Region but it was soon renamed after Baranavichy.

The region was made up of 26 districts in 1944. These districts were Byten, Haradzishcha, Ivyanets, Iwye, Yuratsishki, Karelichy, Kletsk, Kazlowshchyna, Lyakhavichy, Lida, Lubcha, Mir, Masty, Navahrudak, Novaya Mysh, Nyasvizh, Radun, Slonim, Stowbtsy, Shchuchyn, Vasilishki, Valozhyn, Voranava, Dzyatlava, Zelva and Zhaludok. In 1944, the region was diminished after transferring the districts of Lida, Radun, Shchuchyn, Vasilishki, Voranava, Masty, Zelva and Zheludok to the newly founded Grodno Region (including remaining parts of Belastok Region) and those of Iwye, Yuratsishki and Valozhyn to Molodechno Region in 1944. Finally, on 8 January 1954, the region was abolished and the districts were divided between the Brest (Haradzishcha, Lyakhavichy and Novaya Mysh Districts), Grodno (Byten, Karelichy, Kazlowshchyna, Lubcha, Mir, Navahrudak and Slonim), Molodechno (liquidated in 1960) (Ivyanets District) and Minsk (Kletsk, Nyasvizh and Stowbtsy Districts) regions (modern Brest, Grodno and Minsk regions). Thus, Baranavichy became part of Brest Region as a district center after Novaya Mysh's center was moved to Baranavichy on 1 May 1954 and renamed as Baranavichy one after 8 April 1957.
