= Belastok Region =

Short-lived region of the Soviet Union

Belastok Region Беластоцкая вобласць (Belarusian) Белостокская Область (Russian) Obwód białostocki (Polish)
- Region of the Byelorussian SSR
- 1939–1944
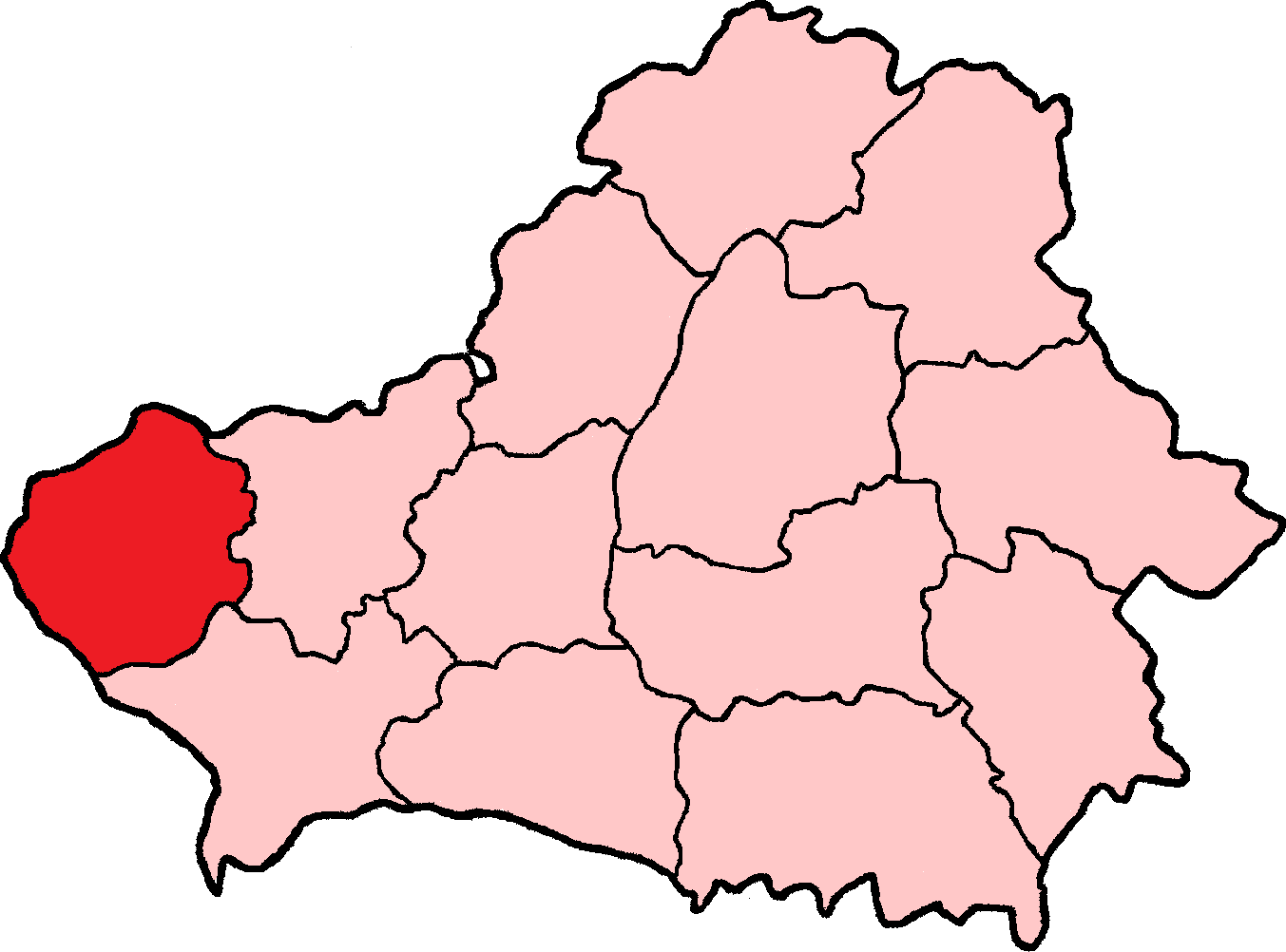
- Location of Belastok Region within the Byelorussian SSR (1944)
- Capital: Belastok (Białystok)
- Area
  - Coordinates: 53°08′N 23°09′E
- Historical era: World War II
  - Established: 4 December 1939
  - Bezirk Bialystok established: 17 July 1941
  - Red Army occupation: July 1944
  - Disestablished: 20 September 1944
- Political subdivisions: 24 raions
- Today part of: Poland; Belarus

Belastok Region, also known as Belastok Voblasts or Belostok Oblast, (Note: Belarusian: Беластоцкая вобласць, romanized: Biełastockaja vobłasć; Russian: Белостокская область; Polish: Obwód białostocki.) was a short-lived region (oblast) of the Byelorussian SSR during World War II, lasting from September 1939 until Operation Barbarossa in 1941, and again for a short period in 1944. The administrative center of the region was the city of Białystok (Belastok), which was annexed from Poland in 1939.

== History ==
=== Integration into the Soviet Union ===
From 23 September to October 1939, the secretary of the central committee of the Belarusian SSR lived in Bialystok due to the protracted procedures for the transfer of the territories west of Bialystok by German troops to Białystok.

While the leaders of provincial boards and were immediately established at the level of the Central Committee and the Military Front Council, the lower structures (powiat, gmina) were established "in consultation with the military authorities", which most often boiled down to providing these authorities with the right to choose the right people from a proven, in-flowing party stream into these lands. As explained on 4 October 1939 at a meeting of the chairmen of the Provisional Boards and the secretary of the Central Committee of the Communist Party of Byelorussia, Panteleimon Ponomarenko, "Temporary local boards – these are the organs of military power and the war council of this or other unit that is stationed in this area, has the right to direct the activities of the temporary administration, has the right and should do so within the framework of the applicable directives of the Front War Council and the Central Committee of the Byelorussian Communist Party.

Vladimir-Wulf Boruchowicz Gajsin served as chairman of the Provisional Board of the Voivodeship from 3rd of October 1939, then of the Provisional District Board, and finally from 4.12.1939 the first chairman of the Obispolkom. From November 29th, 1939, the composition of the Obispolkom included Sergey Ivanovich Maltsev as chairman, Semyon Stepanovich Igaev as 1st secretary of the Obkom, Samuil Semyonovich Kostiuk as 2nd secretary of the Obkom and Pyotr Andreevich Gladkov as head of the District Board of the NKVD. On April 23rd, 1940 after the end of the First Białystok District Conference, the Bureau of the Central Committee of the Communist Party decided to change the composition of the Party District Committee in Białystok with new composition which included Semyon Stepanovich Igaev as First Secretary, Filip J. Popov as Second Secretary, Aleksand I. Savalov as Third Secretary, Pyotr S. Spasov as Secretary for Personnel, Gavril I. Semyonov as Secretary for Propaganda and Sergei Ivanovich Maltsev as Chairman of the Obisplkom.

Since December 1940, Vladimir G. Kudrayev became the First Secretary of the Białystok District Committee of the Communist Party of Belarus. On June 22, 1941, the Bureau of the Białystok District Committee of the Communist Party of Byelorussia consisted of Vladimir G. Kudrayev as First Secretary, Andrei P. Elman as Second Secretary, Aleksander I. Anisimov as Third Secretary and Aleksander A. Kilbin as Secretary for Personnel. The official newspaper of the Belastok Region Party Committee and Białystok City Party Committee of the Communist Party of Byelorussia was Wolna Praca.

=== Reintegration to Belarusian SSR and disbandment ===
In April 1944 a special operational group was established, headed by D. K. Sukaczew, dismissed for this purpose from the oblast on 25 January 1944, which was to deal with reconstruction in triggered peripheral and district areas and municipal executive committees. Preparation also began operational groups from which activists of district committees were to be selected. Over 3,000 cadres who were selected underwent special training in Moscow and Gomel. On 18 April during the meeting of the Central Committee of the CP (b) B an action plan was approved Belostok Region for the coming months was approved. The office agreed to include a group of obek employees (operating in Moscow) together with the second secretary of the Belostok Obkom Andrei Elman as part of the operational group of the Belarusian Headquarters of the Partisan Movement operating under the command of the 1st Belorussian Front. P. Z. Kalinin, commander of BSzRP, commander of the operational group of the staff at the 1st Belarusian Front, and Andrey Elman organized communication with underground party organs and partisan units operating in the territory of the Bialystok region and help them by providing weapons and organizing the dispatch of propaganda literature.

In May 1944, after several months of absence, Sukaczew returned to BZP, already as the chairman of the Regional Executive Committee of the Council of Workers' Delegates in Bialystok. On 15 May 1944, the authorities of the Białystok underground obkom decided to issue more local newspaper.

The secretaries of the district of Communist Party of Byelorussia and representatives of the district executive committees were to install at the district headquarters. Immediately they were to start establishing local government and party structures. The secretaries of the circuit committee were to be informed of all actions without delay. The implementation of this plan from the beginning was very difficult, as many branches failed to reach the designated areas. The situation was complicated by the fact that the Red Army stopped at the end of September on the Narew – Biebrza – Augustów Canal – Czarna Hańcza rivers, which caused that part of the Augustów region and located on the left bank of the Narew, the areas of the Grajewski, Łomżyński and Ostrołęka regions to remain under German control. In spite of the failures in other areas, successive ones began installing Soviet power. He informed about installation in a designated area.

On 3 July 1944, at the next meeting of the Białystok Obkom, it was decided to start publishing 4–6 times a month in Polish, with a circulation of 500 copies of the newsletter with political information. A week later, at the next meeting, a special resolution was adopted "on preparations for the entry of the Red Army and preparation of partisan units to cooperate with the city councilors". On 8 July Pyotr Ratajko was appointed the new chairman of the executive committee of the Białystok Obispolkom.

In the spring of 1944, meetings of the regional committee were held every two weeks, to respond to any changes on an ongoing basis. Based on the preparations, it seems nobody from Belarusian party activists at the central, and even more peripheral level, did not doubt that the Bialystok region was, is and will be inseparable part of the Byelorussian SSR.

In the first days of August 1944, Soviet activists received an order to leave the Białystok that became part of Poland and go further east, to Grodno. Despite the withdrawal of activists, the Belastok Region officially existed in the structures of the Belarusian SSR. Party activists in the Belastok Region then sent a letter to the secretary Panteleimon Ponomarenko of KC KP(b )B, in which they tried to persuade him that he should prevent the loss of Białystok and its surroundings, because, in their opinion, most of the inhabitants of the region were of Belorussian origin.

On 29 July 1944, the first secretary of the Bialystok Regional Committee of the Communist Party P. Elman, secretary of the Sokólki rajkom. Kolkhozes and Sovkhozes began to be restored in the Krynkowski region. Attempts to recreate Soviet power were also made in Brańsk.

== Administrative units ==
Belastok Region was created immediately following the Soviet invasion of Poland on 17 September 1939. It comprised part of the Polish areas annexed by the Soviet Union assigned by Joseph Stalin to BSSR in November 1939 (part of the modern-day West Belarus).

The Region consisted of 24 districts: Augustow, Bialystok, Belsky, Bryansk, Volkovysk, Grodno, Grajewo, Dombrowski, Zabludavski, Zambravski, Kolnavski, Krynkovsky, Lapski, Lomzhinsky, Monkavski (in the same year was renamed to Knyshynski), Porechsky (in the same year transferred to the Lithuanian SSR), Sakolkavski, Sapotskinsky, Skidelsky, Svislochsky, Snyadovski, Tsehanovetsky, Chyzhavski and Yadvabnavski.

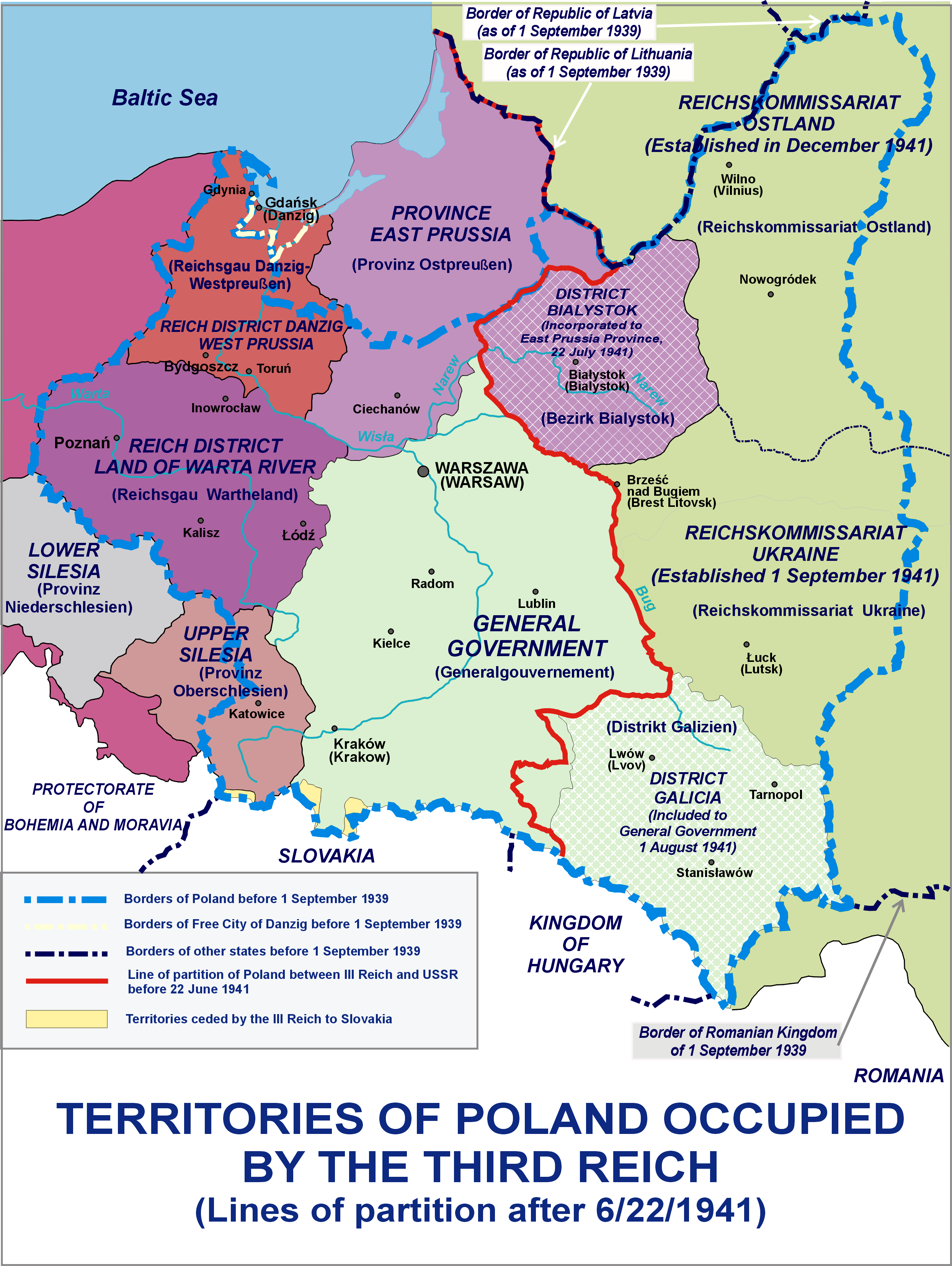
The Nazi–Soviet Molotov–Ribbentrop Pact led to the fourth partition of Poland during 1939–1941 (marked in red). In the upper centre, District Bialystok following Operation Barbarossa

In the aftermath of the German attack on the Soviet Union in June 1941, this western portion of then-Belarus, which until 1939 belonged to the Polish state was placed under German Civil Administration (Zivilverwaltungsgebiet). As Bezirk Bialystok, the area was under German rule from 1941 to 1944/45, without ever formally being incorporated into the German Reich.

After the Soviet liberation of almost the whole territory of the Byelorussian SSR in July 1944, Belastok Region was disestablished on 20 September 1944 and 17 raions, together with 3 raions of the Brest Region were transferred to the Białystok Voivodeship of Poland. The remaining raions were transferred to the Grodno Region of the Byelorussian SSR. This was confirmed later by the Border Agreement between Poland and the USSR of 16 August 1945.

== Demographics ==
In the early months of the occupation in 1939, the new authorities relied on pre-war Polish data, according to which, Białystok had a population of 54,907 Poles, 45,217 Jews, 6,460 Belarusians, and 1,076 individuals of other nationalities, while in the Białystok district, there were 37,577 Poles, 1,508 Jews, 8,573 Belarusians, and 1,298 others. From a propaganda standpoint, these figures were particularly unfavorable, as they directly challenged the narrative that the occupied territories possessed a Belarusian character. The estimates for the Łomża district were even less favorable. During a Central Committee meeting on 1 December 1939, Ponomarenko described Łomża as a city inhabited by Poles and Jews. He noted that it had suffered extensive damage from military operations, yet its residents remained relatively at peace with the new authorities. According to official data, as of 1 January 1940, Łomża was home to 18,105 Poles and 8,356 Jews. The process of establishing the new power was completed in the first half of January 1940.

According to Soviet statistical data, by mid-1940, the Belastok oblast had a population of 1,322,260. Of this total, 60.7% (802,770) were Poles, 22.7% (300,782) were Belarusians, 14.6% (193,510) were Jews, 0.63% (8,639) were Lithuanians, 0.09% (1,246) were Russians, and 1.15% (15,313) were recorded as Tutejszy.

== See also ==
- Polish population transfers (1944–1946)
- Curzon Line
