= Vileyka Region =

Former territorial unit in the Belarusian Soviet Socialist Republic

Vileyka Region Belarusian: Вілейская вобласць Russian: Вилейская область
- Region of the Byelorussian SSR
- 1939–1944
- Map of the Byelorussian SSR in 1940, of which Vileyka Region was a part.
- Capital: Vileyka
- Area
  - Coordinates: 54°29′N 26°55′E
  - 1941: 20,700 km^{2} (8,000 sq mi)
- Population
  - 1941: 938,000
- History
  - Established: 4 December 1939
  - Disestablished: 20 September 1944
- Political subdivisions: 22 districts
Preceded by	Succeeded by
Wilno Voivodeship (1926–1939)	Molodechno Region

Vileyka Region (Belarusian: Вілейская вобласць, romanized: Viliejskaja voblasc; Russian: Вилейская область, romanized: Vileyskaya oblast) was a territorial entity in the Byelorussian Soviet Socialist Republic created on 4 December 1939 out of the eastern powiats of the Wilno Voivodeship after the Soviet annexation of Western Belorussia of (then part of the Kresy region in Poland) into the Byelorussian SSR on 14 November 1939. The administrative centre of the region was the city of Vileyka.

Initially the region consisted of Vileyka, Ashmyany, Braslaw, Dzisna, Pastavy, and Sventiany districts. In January 1940, it consisted of 22 districts: Astravyets, Ashmyany, Braslaw, Vidzy, Gadutsishki, Hlybokaye, Dzisna, Dokshytsy, Dunilavichy, Ilya, Kryvichy, Kuraniets, Maladzyechna, Miory, Miadzieł, Pastavy, Plisa, Radashkovichy, Smarhon, Sventiany, Svir and Sharkawshchyna. In November 1940, the Gadutsishki and Sventiany districts, as well as parts of the Astravyets, Ashmyany, Pastavy and Svir districts were transferred to the Lithuanian SSR. Also, during the German occupation between 1941 and 1944, Ashmyany District was part of Wilna Land General Bezirk at Litauen and the city of Vileyka Glubokoye was part of General Bezirk Weissruthenien in Reichskommissariat Ostland.

On 20 September 1944, the oblast was renamed to Molodechno Region, and the administrative centre was relocated to Maladzyechna. On the same day, Vidzy, Hlybokaye, Dzisna, Dokshitsi, Dunilovichi, Miory, Plisa, and Sharkovshchina Districts, as well as Kuropolye village in Postavy District were transferred to Polatsk Voblast, and the Iwye, Valozhyn, and Yuratsishky districts of Baranavichy Region were transferred to Molodechno. Vileyka, the former regional centre, was part of Kuraniets District and became a district centre after the district was renamed Vileyka on 5 July 1946.
