= Pinsk Region =

Former region of the Byelorussian SSR

Pinsk Region Belarusian: Пінская вобласць Russian: Пинская Область
- Region of Byelorussian SSR
- 1939–1954
- Pinsk Region (red) on the map of Byelorussian SSR in 1944
- Capital: Pinsk
- Historical era: World War II
  - Established: 4 December 1939
  - Disestablished: 8 January 1954
- Political subdivisions: 11 districts
Preceded by	Succeeded by
Polesie Voivodeship	Brest Region

Pinsk Region (Pinsk Voblasts, Belarusian: Пінская вобласць, Russian: Пинская Область) was a territorial unit in the Byelorussian Soviet Socialist Republic created after the Soviet annexation of Western Belorussia in November 1939. The administrative centre of the province was the city of Pinsk, the oblast was founded on 4 December 1939 with 16.3 thousand square km and 533.6 thousand people.

The Region consisted of 11 raions:

- Hantsavitski
- Davyd-Haradotski
- Drahichynski
- Zhabchytski
- Ivanauski
- Lahishynski
- Lyeninski
- Luninyetski
- Pinski
- Stolinski
- Cyelyekhanski

With four cities: Pinsk, Davyd-Haradok, Luninyets and Stolin

On 8 January 1954, due to the administrative reform of the BSSR the Oblast was completely incorporated into the modern Brest Region.
