= Skrobek =

Skrobek is a surname. Notable people with the surname include:

- Aron Skrobek (1889–1943), Polish trade unionist and journalist
- Gerhard Skrobek (1922–2007), German sculptor
- Ryszard Skrobek (born 1951), Polish chess player

== See also ==
- Skrbek
