= Bereza Kartuska Prison =

1930s Polish prison

Bereza Kartuska
- Concentration camp
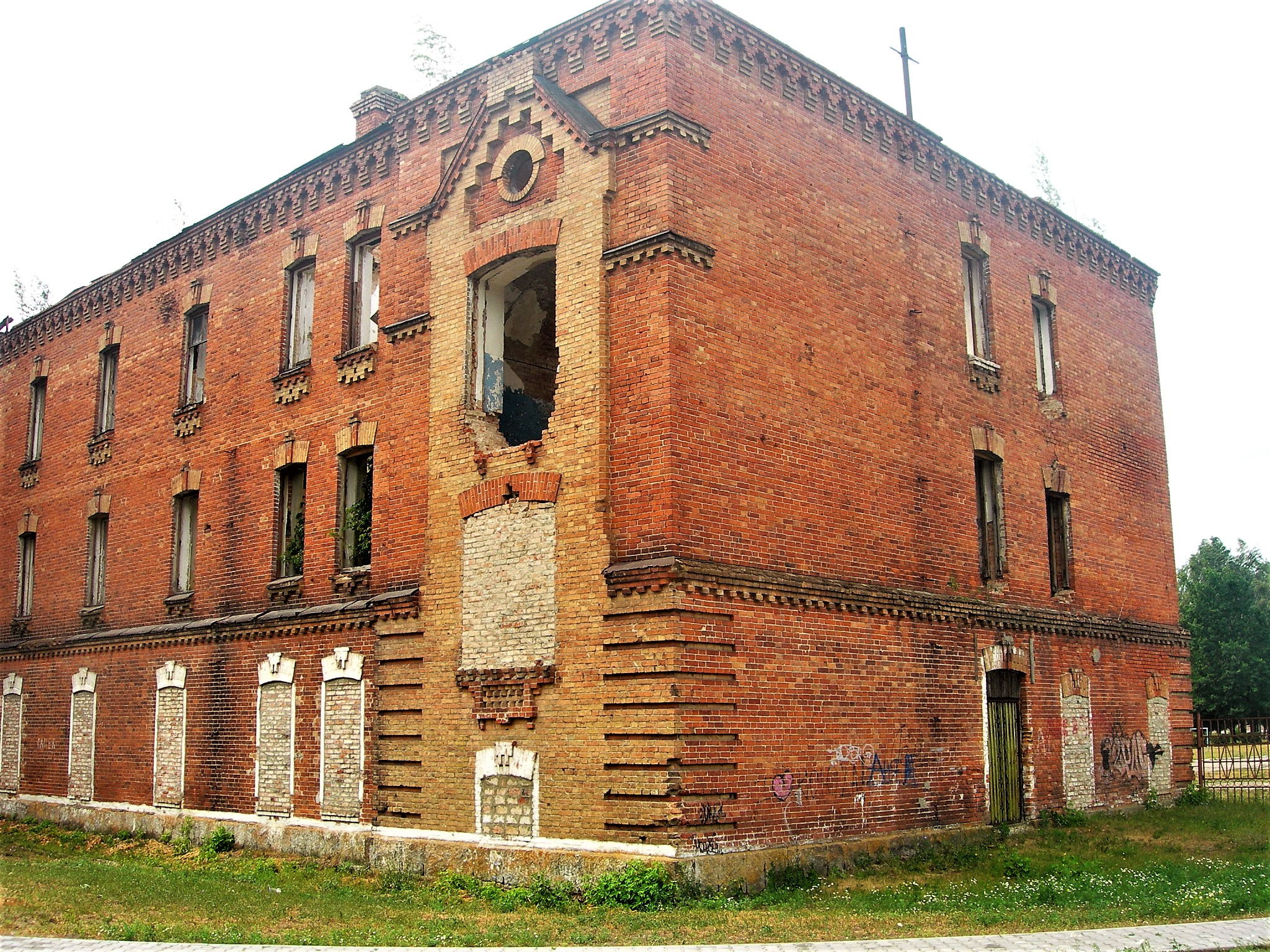
- Main building.

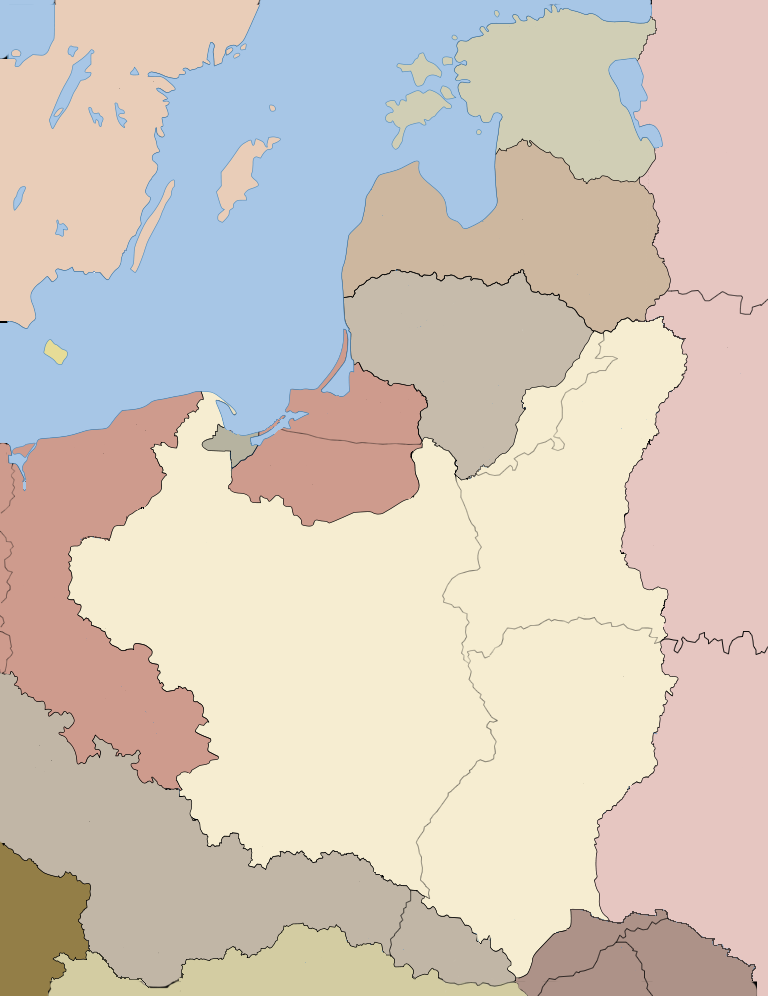
- Location within Poland
- Coordinates: 52°33′N 24°58′E
- Location: Bereza Kartuska, Polesie Voivodeship
- Built by: Second Polish Republic
- Operated by: Polish police force
- Original use: Political and criminal prison
- Operational: 1934–1939
- Inmates: National Democrats, communists, members of the Polish People's Party, Ukrainian and Belarusian nationalists
- Number of inmates: More than 3,000
- Liberated by: Abandoned, 17 September 1939

Bereza Kartuska Prison (Miejsce Odosobnienia w Berezie Kartuskiej, "Place of Isolation at Bereza Kartuska") was a prison operated by Poland's Sanation government from 1934 to 1939 in Bereza Kartuska, Polesie Voivodeship (today, Biaroza, Belarus). Because the inmates were detained without trial or conviction, it is considered an internment camp or concentration camp.

Bereza Kartuska Prison was established on 17 June 1934 by order of President Ignacy Mościcki to detain persons who were viewed by the Polish state as a "threat to security, peace, and social order" or alternately to isolate and demoralize political opponents of the Sanation government such as National Democrats, communists, members of the Polish People's Party, and Ukrainian and Belarusian nationalists. Prisoners were sent to the camp on the basis of an administrative decision, without formal charges, judicial sanction, or trial, and without the possibility of appeal. Prisoners were detained for a period of three months, with the possibility of indefinite extension.

Detainees were expected to perform penal labour. Often prisoners were tortured, and at least 13 prisoners died. Besides political prisoners, starting in October 1937 recidivists and financial criminals were also sent to the camp. During the German invasion of Poland in September 1939, the camp guards fled on news of the German advance, and the prisoners were freed.

== History ==
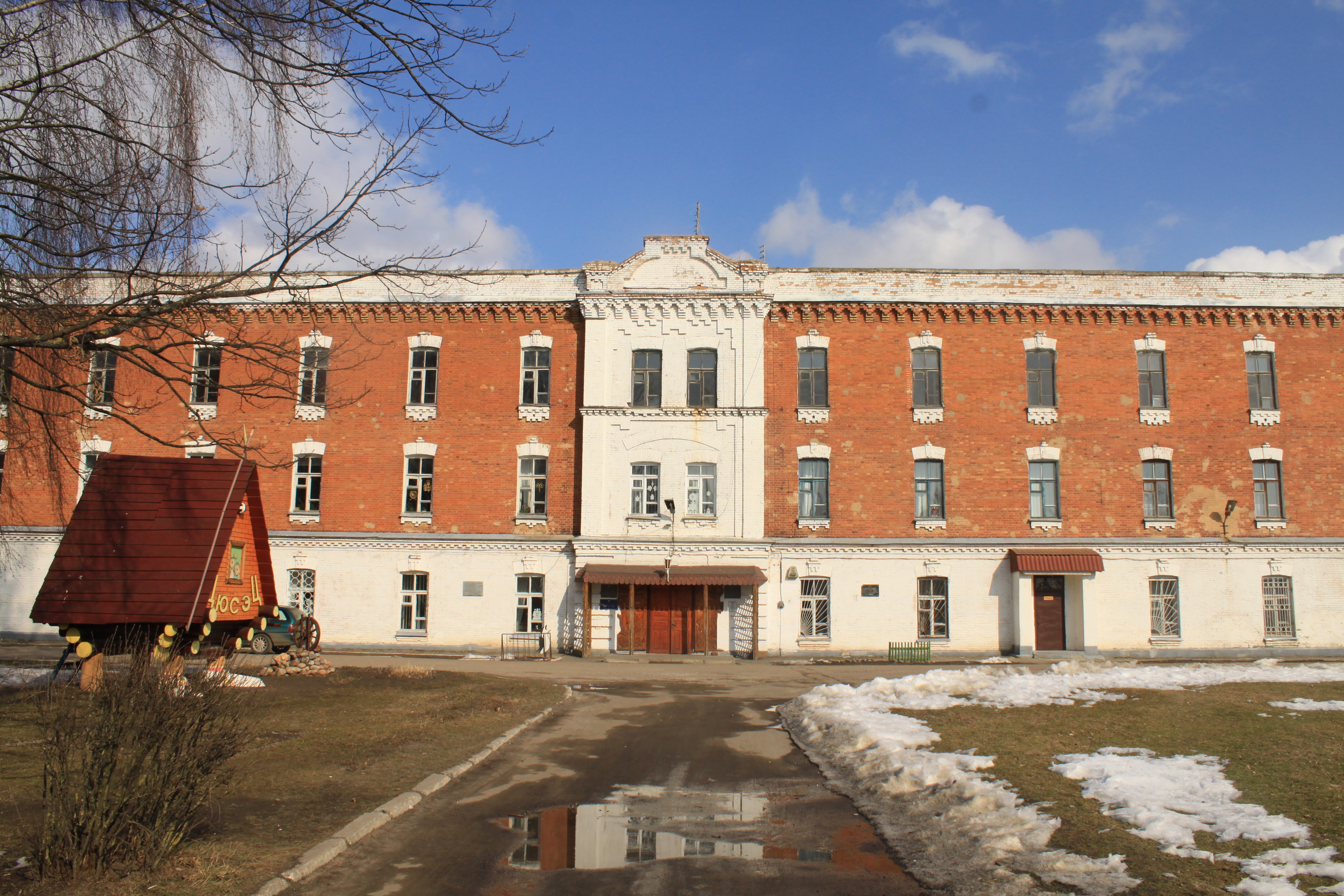
Former building of the prison in 2010

It was created on July 12, 1934, in former Russian barracks and prison at Bereza Kartuska on the authority of a June 17, 1934, order issued by Polish President Ignacy Mościcki. The event that directly influenced Poland's de facto dictator, Józef Piłsudski, to create the prison was the assassination of Polish Minister of Internal Affairs Bronisław Pieracki on June 15, 1934, by the Organization of Ukrainian Nationalists (OUN). It was intended to accommodate persons "whose activities or conduct give reason to believe that they threaten the public security, peace or order." According to Piłsudski's adiutant, Capt. Mieczysław Lepecki, the idea to establish an "isolation camp" for violent extremists originated from Prime Minister Leon Kozłowski during a meeting with Piłsudski, shortly after the attack on Pieracki. Piłsudski agreed to the proposal provided that the camp would exist for a maximum of one year.

The Bereza Kartuska Prison was organized by the director of the Political Department of the Ministry of Internal Affairs, Wacław Żyborski, and the head of that Department's Nationalities Section (Wydział Narodowościowy), Colonel Leon Jarosławski. The institution was later supervised by the Governor of Polesie Province, Colonel Wacław Kostek-Biernacki. In the view of some historians, Kostek-Biernacki did not serve as commandant; they identify its commandants as police inspectors Bolesław Greffner (whose given name is sometimes stated as "Jan"), of Poznań, and Józef Kamala-Kurhański. Officially, Bereza Kartuska was not a part of Poland's penitentiary system, and the staff was composed of policemen, sent there as a punishment, rather than professional prison guards.

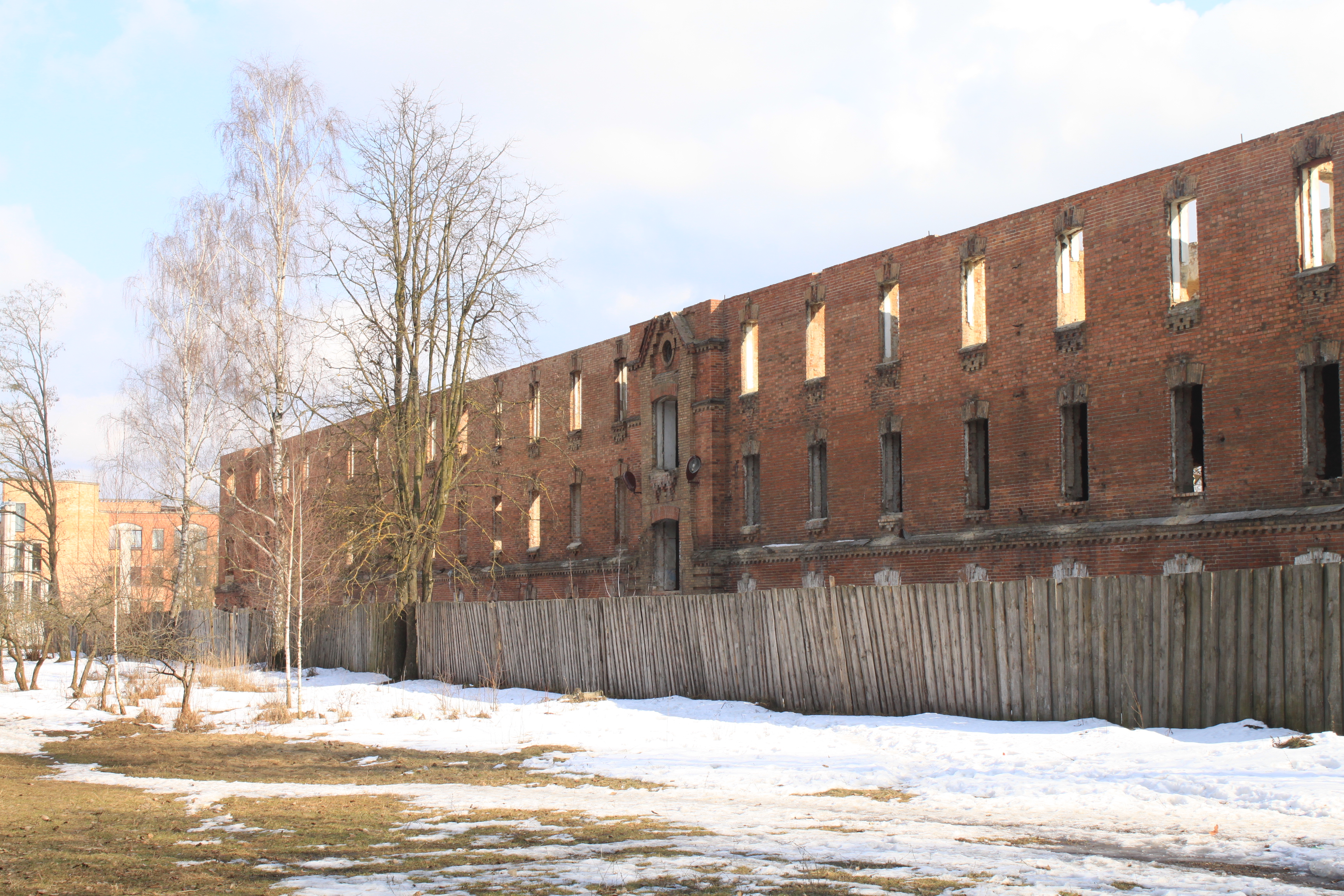
Former prison building in 2010, to be reconstructed

Individuals were incarcerated at Bereza Kartuska by administrative decision, without right of appeal, for three months, although this term was often extended while Colonel Wacław Kostek-Biernacki served as its commander. The average prisoner would spend 8 months in the camp. In the first three years of its history, the camp incarcerated people perceived as subversives and political opponents of the ruling Sanation regime. Recidivists and financial criminals were also detained starting from October 1937. Citizens suspected of pro-German sympathies were first detained in Bereza in the middle of 1938. In the first days of the September Campaign of 1939, Polish authorities started mass arrests of people suspected of such sympathies. Some members of the German minority in Poland were detained along with their families, including women (previously never detained in the camp).

The camp de facto ceased to exist on the night of September 17–18, 1939 when, after learning about the Soviet invasion of Poland, the staff had abandoned it. According to two reports, the departing policemen murdered some prisoners.

== Inmates ==
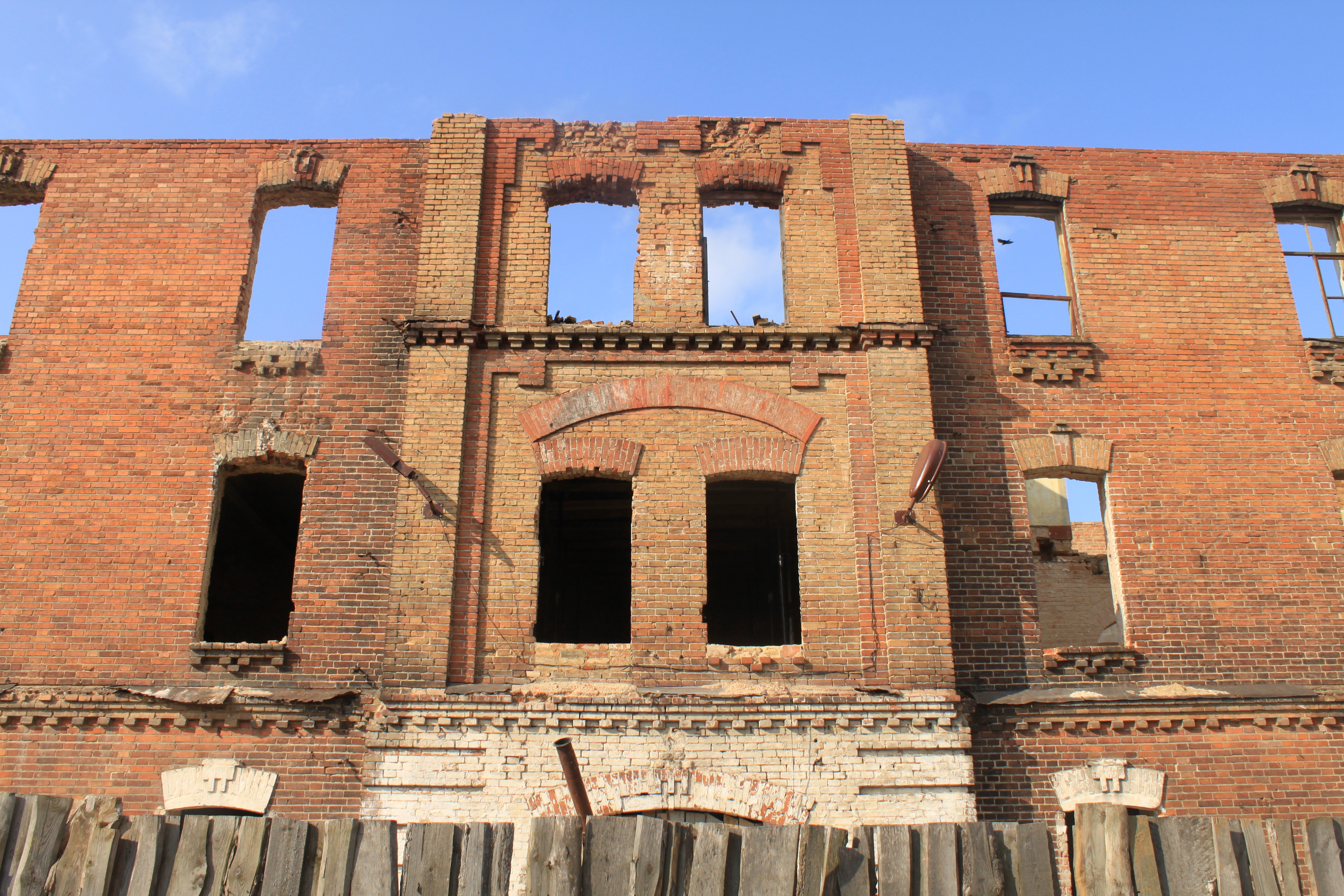
Prison building in 2010

According to the surviving documentation of the camp, more than 3,000 people were overall detained in Bereza Kartuska from July 1934 until August 29, 1939. However, the camp's authorities stopped formally registering detainees in September 1939, after mass arrests began. According to incomplete data from Soviet sources, at least 10,000 people had gone through the prison.

=== Reasons for arrest ===
Prisoners included members of the Organization of Ukrainian Nationalists (OUN), Polish Communist Party (KPP) and National Radical Camp (ONR), as well as members of the People's Party (SL) and Polish Socialist Party (PPS). The detainees included Bolesław Piasecki and, for some dozen days, the journalist Stanisław Mackiewicz (the latter, paradoxically, a warm supporter of the prison's establishment). Also a number of Belarusians who had resisted Polonization found themselves in the camp.

The first inmates—Polish ONR activists—arrived on July 17, 1934. A few days later, OUN activists arrived: Roman Shukhevych, Dmytro Hrytsai and Volodymyr Yaniv. By August 1939, Ukrainians constituted 17 percent of prisoners.

In April 1939, 38 members of the Karpacka Sicz organization were detained in the camp. They were ethnic Ukrainians, previously residing in the Carpathian Ruthenia region of Czechoslovakia, where they were attempting to create an independent Ukrainian state. After this region was annexed by Hungary, Hungarian authorities deported them to Poland, where they were sent to Bereza Kartuska. Unlike other prisoners, they didn't have to perform any labours and had the right to freely talk to each other in a low voice.

Reason for detention by percentage of inmates:

	1934	1935	1936	1937	1938	I–VIII 1939	Summary
Communists	70%	66%	100%	73%	39%	50%	55%
Far-right parties' members	10%	17%	-	-	-	-	2%
Ukrainian nationalists	30%	17%	-	-	-	-	4%
Peasant parties' activists	-	-	-	-	1%	-	1%
Nazism supporters	-	-	-	-	1%	-	1%
"Anti-state activists" (szkodnicy)	-	-	-	-	-	1%	≈0%
Karpacka Sicz members	-	-	-	-	-	2%	≈0%
Criminals	-	-	-	23%	55%	41%	35%
Financial criminals	-	-	-	4%	4%	6%	2%

=== Known inmates ===
- Polish nationalists – Zygmunt Dziarmaga, Władysław Chackiewicz, Jan Jodzewicz, Edward Kemnitz, Bolesław Piasecki, Mieczysław Prószyński, Henryk Rossman, Bolesław Świderski, Witold Borowski, Stanisław Mackiewicz, Adam Doboszyński, Leon Mirecki
- Polish communists – Henryk Bromboszcz, Leib Dajez, Abram Germański (died there), Leon Pasternak, Marek Rakowski, Aron Skrobek, Szymon Dobrzyński (a.k.a. "Eckstein")
- Ukrainian nationalists – Taras Bulba-Borovets, Dmytro Dontsov, Dmytro Hrytsai, Dmytro Klyachkivsky, Hryhory Klymiv, Volodymyr Kunanec, Omelian Matla, Bohdan Pashkovskyi, Roman Shukhevych, Mykhailo Yaniv, Volodymyr Yaniv
- Ukrainian communists – Włodzimierz Sznarbachowski
- Belarusian nationalists – Viachaslau Bahdanovich, Uladzislau Pauliukouski, Juljan Sakovich
- Others – Orest Kazanivsky, Leonard Malik, Jan Mozyrko (died there), Janka Shutovich

== Conditions ==
From 1934 to 1937, the facility usually housed 100–500 inmates at a time. In April 1938 the number went up to 800. In early 1938, the Polish government suddenly increased the number of inmates by sending 4,500 Ukrainian nationalists, terrorists, and members of Organization of Ukrainian Nationalists to Bereza Kartuska without the right of appeal.

Conditions were exceptionally harsh, and only one inmate managed to escape. Only one suicide occurred; on 5 February 1939, inmate Dawid Cymerman slit his throat in a toilet. The number of deaths in detention was kept artificially low by releasing prisoners who were in poor health. According to Śleszyński, 13 inmates died during the facility's operation, most of them at a hospital in Kobryń. In other sources, the total number of deaths, is variously given as between 17 and 20. This number is also repeated in recent sources; for example, Norman Davies in God's Playground (1979) gives the number of deaths as 17. Ukrainian historian, Viktor Idzio, states that according to official statistics, 176 men – by unofficial Polish statistics, 324 Ukrainians – were murdered or tortured to death during questioning, or died from disease, while escaping, or disappeared without a trace. According to Idzio, most were OUN members.

OUN members who were incarcerated at Bereza Kartuska testified to the use of torture. There were frequent beatings (with boards being placed against inmates' backs and struck with hammers), forced labor, constant harassment, the use of solitary confinement without provocation, punishment for inmates' use of the Ukrainian language, etc. By the time they were released from Bereza Kartuska, many Ukrainians had had their health destroyed or had died. Taras Bulba-Borovets, who later became otaman of the Ukrainian Insurgent Army (UPA), developed epilepsy as a result of his stay in Bereza Kartuska.

Prisoners were accommodated within the main compound, in a three-story brick building. A small white structure served for solitary confinement (in Ukrainian, "kartser"; in Polish, "karcer"). South of the solitary-confinement structure was a well, and south of that was a bathing area. The whole compound was encircled by an electrified barbed-wire fence. Across a road from this compound were the commandant's house and officers' barracks. In the prisoners' building, each cell initially held 15 inmates. There were no benches or tables. In 1938 the number of inmates per cell was increased to up to 70. The floors were of concrete and were constantly showered with water so that inmates could not sit.

Kazimierz Baran wrote that "the rigour detectable in Beraza Kartuska camp can by no means be compared with the dreadful conditions of the Nazi or Soviet-organized labour camps".

== Naming ==
The Polish government called the institution "Miejsce Odosobnienia w Berezie Kartuskiej" ("Place of Isolation at Bereza Kartuska"). From the facility's inception, the Sanation government's opponents openly criticized the legal basis for its establishment and operation, calling it a "concentration camp." This term was also used by Western media sources such as The Times, both during the interbellum and immediately after World War II. It was later popularized by communist propaganda, which cited the prison as evidence that Poland's prewar government had been a "fascist" regime. In 2007, the Polish Embassy objected to the use of the term in a memorial plaque in Paris for the Bereza Kartuska inmate Aron Skrobek. Its objections were successful and the plaque instead described the facility as a seclusion camp.

Modern scholarship has characterized the facility as a concentration camp, including Yale University professor Timothy Snyder, the United States Holocaust Memorial Museum, the Library of Congress, Polish Nobel Prize-winning author Czesław Miłosz, and historian Karol Modzelewski, who was political prisoner and one of the leaders of the democratic opposition in the communist Poland. Ukrainian sources such as Kubijovych and Idzio representing the Ukrainian Nationalist camp of the interpretation of history also categorize Bereza Kartuska as a concentration camp. Polish-American historian Tadeusz Piotrowski who also calls it a concentration camp, notes that the establishment of the facility was a norm of its times, similar to other facilities where political opponents were locked up, often in an extrajudicial manner. (Like the giant German or Soviet networks of concentration camps, degrees of brutality and number of prisoners aside.) Describing Bereza Kartuska as a concentration camp may be against the Polish Holocaust law, according to historian Tomasz Stryjek.

== See also ==
- Internment
- List of concentration and internment camps
- Kresy
