= Polesia Region =

Former region of Belarus

Polesia Region Палеская вобласць Полесская Область
- Region of the Byelorussian SSR
- 1938–1954
- Capital: Mozyr
- Historical era: Cold War
  - Established: 15 January 1938
  - Disestablished: 8 January 1954
- Political subdivisions: 15 raions
Preceded by	Succeeded by
Byelorussian SSR; Polesie Voivodeship	Gomel Region

Polesia Region (Belarusian: Палеская вобласць, romanized: Palieskaja voblasć, Russian: Полесская область) was an administrative division in the Byelorussian Soviet Socialist Republic. It was created on 15 January 1938. It included the territories of eastern Polesia and consisted of 15 districts. The center of Polesia Region was the town of Mozyr.

On 8 January 1954, Polesia Region was liquidated and became part of Gomel Region.

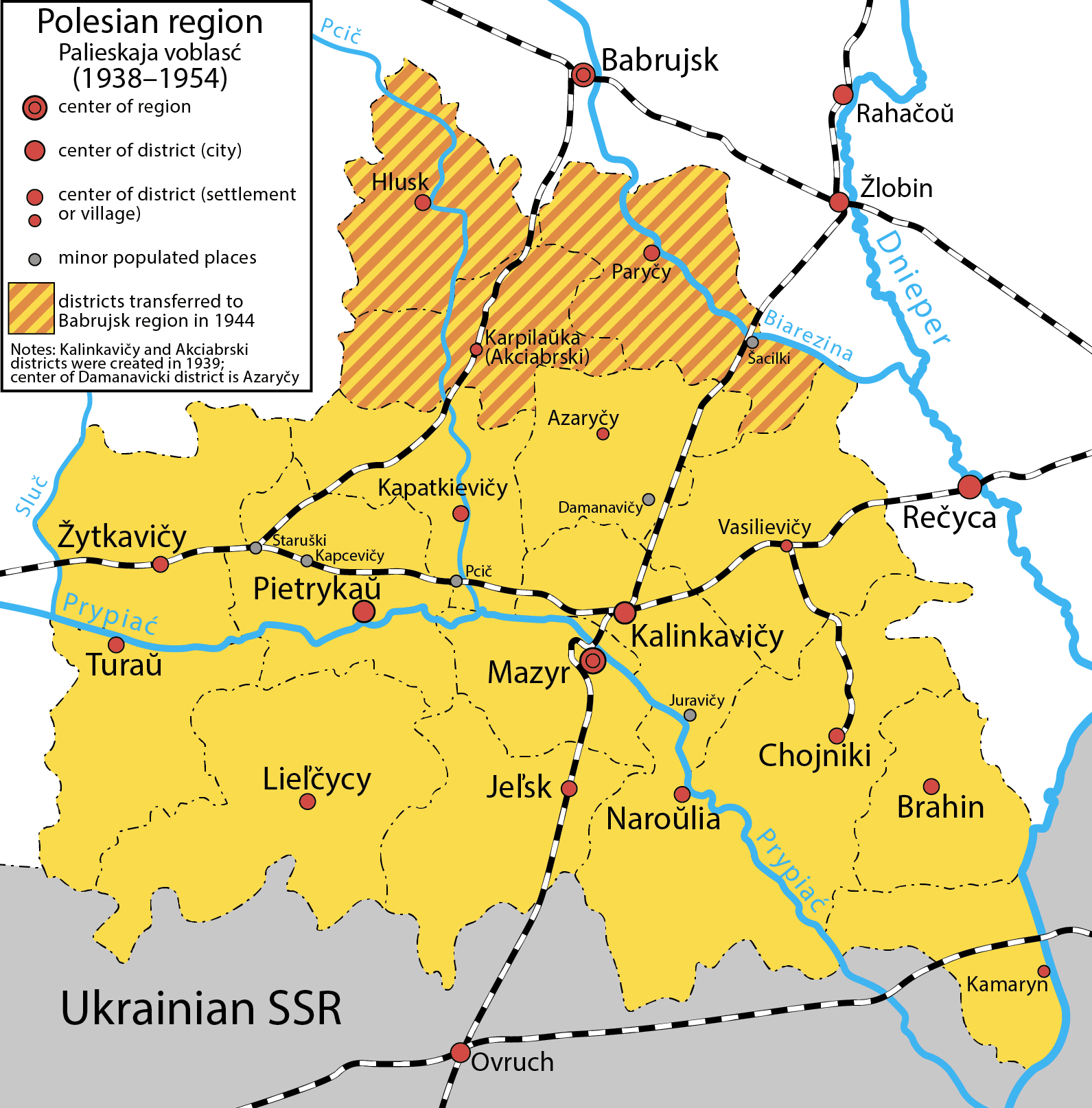
