= Volodymyr Yaniv =

Ukrainian poet, historian, psychologist, activist

- Володимир Янів
- Born: 21 November 1908; Lviv, Galicia
- Died: 19 November 1991 (aged 82)
- Education: Lviv University
- Occupations: Nationalist activist, university professor, historian, psychologist, poet
- Known for: Scouting leadership, activism in OUN and UVO, professorship at Ukrainian Free University
- Notable work: Studies on the effect of incarceration on Ukrainian cultural figures

Volodymyr-Mykhailo Osypovych Yaniv (Ukrainian: Володимир-Михайло Осипович Янів; 21 November 1908 – 19 November 1991) was a Ukrainian nationalist activist, university professor, historian, psychologist, and poet.

== BIography ==
Yaniv was born on 21 November 1908 in Lviv, Galicia. He was community and scouting leader in the 1930s. He was an activist in the OUN and the Ukrainian Military Organization (UVO), editor of numerous student and community publications. He was a professor of Psychology at the Ukrainian Catholic Seminary in Hirschberg Castle (1947–1948), professor of the Ukrainian Free University in Munich (from 1955) and its rector (1968–1986), professor of the Ukrainian Catholic University in Rome (from 1963), a publicist, poet, member of the Shevchenko Scientific Society (from 1987).

Yaniv completed his gymnasium studies in Lviv in 1928 and further studied history and psychology at the Lviv University. After incarceration at the Bereza Kartuska concentration camp he completed his studies in Berlin with a dissertation on "The psychological changes of political prisoners". In 1946 he moved to Munich where took an active part in the life of the Ukrainian Free University. Yaniv wrote numerous works studying the effect of incarceration on the works of notable Ukrainian cultural figures such as Taras Shevchenko, Ivan Franko, Lesia Ukrainka, Vasyl Symonenko, Ihor Kalynets.

=== Plast ===
In his youth, in 1927–1932, Yaniv took an interest in the Plast Ukrainian scouting movement, in which he held various leadership roles. He returned to scouting in 1946 and continued to be active in Ukrainian scouting to the end of his life.

=== Incarceration ===
Yaniv was first arrested by the Polish police for a period of two years in 1934–1935 at the Bereza Kartuska concentration camp. In 1936 he was once again arrested and given a 5-year term before being released in 1938. In July 1941 he was arrested by the Germans and confined in Kraków for membership in the Ukrainian National Committee, established on 21 June 1941. His prison experiences became the basis for his dissertation and many of the books and studies he published in later years.

== His poems ==
Battle of Kruty

The golden blaze has lighten up,
The world has shuddered from sound of trumpets,
The glory widely could be heard
That has arisen for us our country
And Ukraine has stepped out of jails.

The wounds of hundred years has healed
As no more horror was there present
Of tyrants that laid in dew
Our heavy shackles has been torn
And the path into the future has cleared up...

== Awards ==
- Commander of the Order of St. Gregory the Great.

== Sources ==
- Encyclopedia of Ukraine (in Ukrainian), vol. 10, p. 3,973.
- The collection of the Ukrainian songs (in Ukrainian)
