= Wacław Kostek-Biernacki =

Polish interwar politician

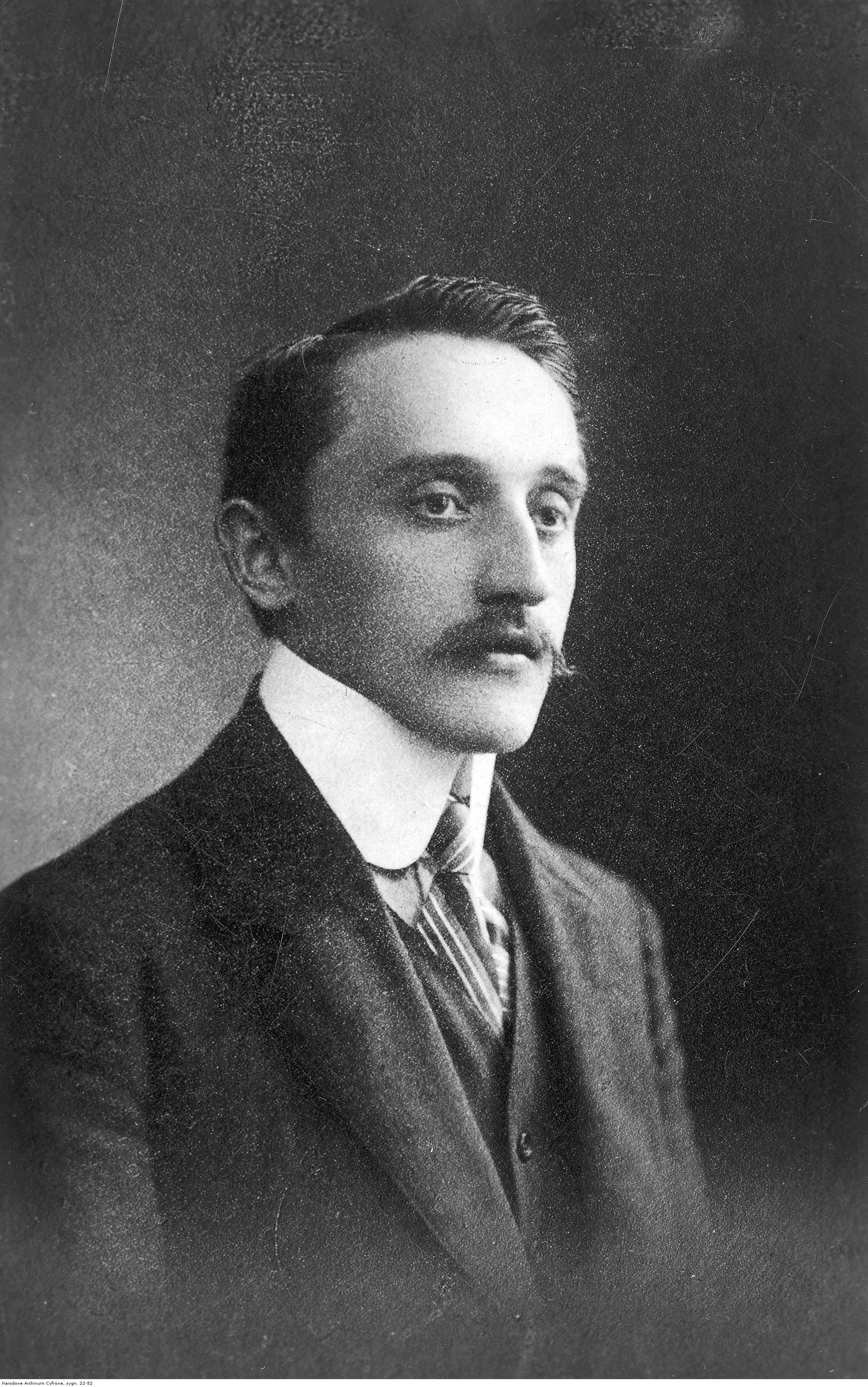

Voivode of Polesie Voivodeship
- In office 8 September 1932 – 2 September 1939
- Preceded by: Jan Krahelski
- Succeeded by: Position abolished (Soviet occupation)

Voivode of Nowogródek Voivodeship
- In office 1 July 1931 – 8 September 1932
- Preceded by: Zygmunt Beczkowicz
- Succeeded by: Stefan Świderski

Personal details
- Born: September 24, 1884 Lublin, Congress Poland
- Died: 25 May 1957 (aged 72) Warsaw, Polish People's Republic
- Awards: Order of Polonia Restituta; Cross of Independence; Cross of Valour; Cross of Merit

Wacław Kostek-Biernacki (24 September 1884 – 25 May 1957) was a Polish interwar politician and a popular fantasy writer (pen name Brunon Kostecki) as well as a Polish soldier of World War II, imprisoned and blacklisted in Stalinist Poland. In his youth, he was an activist in the Polish Socialist Party, and member of the secret Polish Military Organisation during World War I. Kostek-Biernacki joined the Polish Legions in World War I under Józef Piłsudski. He supported the May Coup d'État of 1926.

He was a Voivode of Nowogródek Voivodeship from 1931 to 1932, and of Polesie Voivodeship from 1932 to 1939. Only in his capacity of a voivode, he supervised the operation of nearby Bereza Kartuska; nonetheless, he also took a lot of interest in it, often to the detriment of communist prisoners whose sentences were sometimes prolonged extra-judicially.

Also in 1932, Kostek-Biernacki published his best-known collection of horror stories and novellas called Straszny gość (Ghastly guest) under the pen name Brunon Kostecki. The book featured six titles: "Twarda proswirka", "Straszny gość", "Zdradliwe żonki", "Zmora", "Kamienne krzyże", and "Chytrość Marusi". After the German invasion of Poland in 1939 he left Poland with the evacuating government. He was interned in Romania until 1944, and deported back to Poland by Romanian communists in 1945. He was arrested by the Communist secret police and after eight years without trial spent in Mokotów Prison, he was sentenced to death in April 1953 on the false charge of "supporting fascism." His sentence was commuted to 10 years in prison. His books were deliberately destroyed. Biernacki was released after being amnestied in 1955, and died in 1957.

== Biography ==
=== Early life ===
Wacław Biernacki was born on 28 September 1884 in Lublin, then in the Russian-held part of partitioned Poland. He started his gymnasium there, but already in 1895 he was briefly arrested by the Okhrana for taking part in an anti-Russian demonstration. Around that time he started cooperating for the – illegal in Russia – Polish Socialist Party and the Polish National League, initially mostly as a leaflet courier. In 1902, at the age of 18, he organised a city-wide riot against forcing the school pupils to sing the Russian national anthem, for which he was finally dismissed from his school and forced to leave Lublin. He crossed the border with Galicia, where he settled in Brzeżany and finally passed his matura exam.

His parents sponsored his further education in Lwów (then a predominantly Polish city and the capital of Galicia - the Austrian Partition). In 1903 he joined the medical faculty of the John Casimir University and at the same time started studies at the Imperial Polytechnical Academy. There he met some of the main politicians of the Polish Socialist Party (PPS) who were at that time residing in relatively peaceful Galicia, including PPS's chief Józef Piłsudski. Under their influence Biernacki became actively involved in party's underground activities in all three partitions. By 1905 he devoted himself solely to party activities and abandoned his university career without a diploma. Within the structures of the Combat Organization of the Polish Socialist Party he adopted a nom-de-guerre of Kostek (diminutive of the given name of Konstanty), which he later added to his surname.

For his actions against Russian authorities, many of which were bordering modern terrorism, Kostek-Biernacki was frequently arrested by tsarist authorities, but he was never caught red-handed and was usually released soon afterwards. Among the most notable of his actions was an armed train robbery in Sławków and numerous assaults on tsarist officials in Warsaw. He was arrested in Piotrków in 1906, and again in Warsaw in 1907. Released, he returned to his duties within the PPS in Dąbrowa Górnicza, Radom, Warsaw and Lublin. In 1907 he was yet again arrested and imprisoned in the heavy prison at the Lublin Castle. However, already on 25 May 1907 he staged a successful escape together with 20 other political prisoners.

Constantly risking arrest and life imprisonment or forced resettlement to Siberia (a common penalty in Russia until the mid-20th century), he once again fled to Galicia, this time settling in Kraków, where he requested political asylum. Under pressure from Russian diplomats the authorities of Austria-Hungary refused and Kostek-Biernacki had to flee to France, where he joined the French Foreign Legion. Already in 1908 he was dispatched to Algeria, where he took part in fights against the natives in the vicinity of Sidi Bel Abbès. However, the following year he restored contacts with Walery Sławek, his former colleague and collaborator from the PPS. The latter helped him defect the Foreign Legion and return to Poland.

== World War I and military career ==
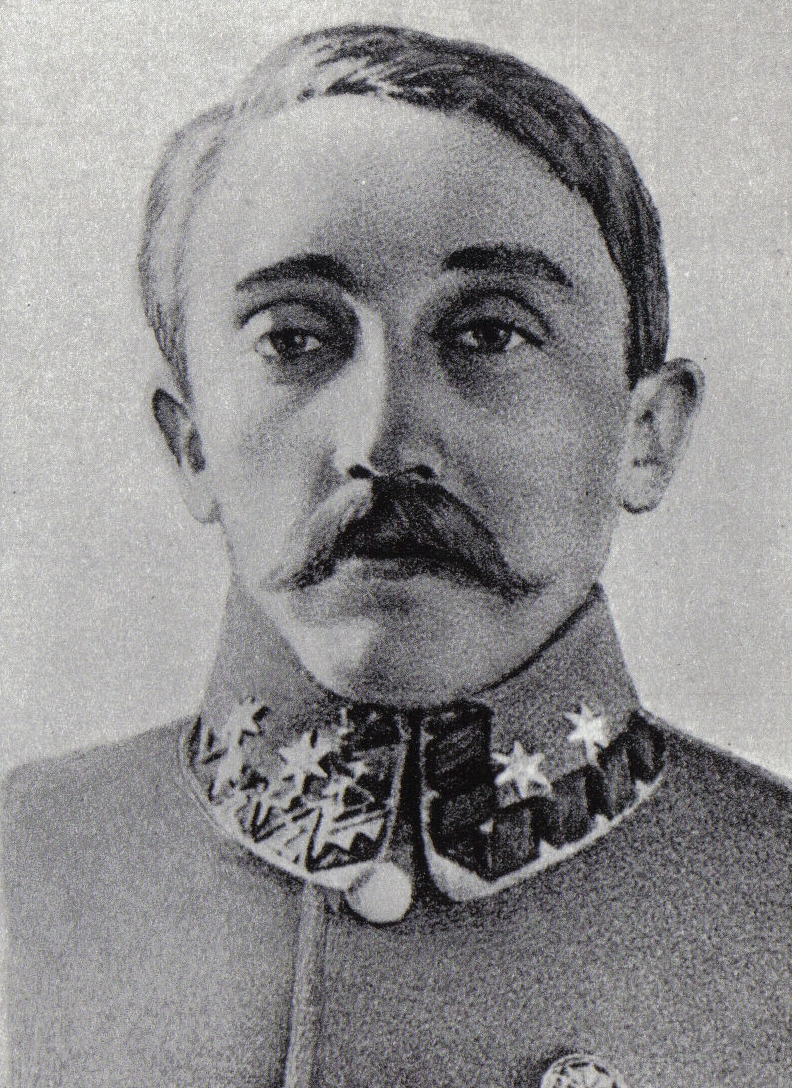
Wacław Kostek-Biernacki, 1914

His terrorist past and military training in France and Algeria made Wacław Kostek-Biernacki one of the best-trained military leaders the PPS and its leader Józef Piłsudski had at their disposal. After his return to Poland he joined the Union of Active Struggle (ZWC), where he became the main instructor of infantry tactics. He also closely cooperated with the structures of the then-legal Riflemen's Association. He also returned to the John Casimir University to finish his medical studies and underwent the officers' military training within the Austro-Hungarian Army. After the outbreak of World War I, already in July 1914, Kostek-Biernacki joined the Polish Legions. He served initially as a chief of military police of the 1st Brigade (en cadre). On 9 November that year he was promoted to the rank of podporucznik (2nd Lieutenant).

Beloved by his fellow soldiers of the Legions, Kostek-Biernacki became also somewhat feared by the civilian population of the formerly Russian part of Poland. As chief of military police he presided the court martial and signed most sentences, often as high as capital punishment, for treason, collaboration with the Russians or attempts at harming the Austro-Hungarian war effort. At the same time he also became known as the author of a popular song on Józef Piłsudski entitled "Song of the dear commander" (Polish: Pieśń o wodzu miłym), popular in Poland even in the 21st century. Following the Oath Crisis of 1917 and Legions' switching sides, Biernacki was interned in Beniaminów together with a large group of former soldiers of the Legions. In the prisoner of war camp he founded a camp library, satirical journal Sprzymierzeniec (Ally) and a prisoner theatre.

In November 1918 Poland regained her independence and Kostek-Biernacki was released from the POW camp. He moved to Kraków, where he immediately joined the Polish Military Organisation, the predecessor of Polish intelligence services. Mobilised into the Polish Army, in early 1919 he was attached to the Siedlce-based 22nd Infantry Regiment. He officially served as an officer in that regiment during the Polish-Bolshevist War of 1920, he did not take part in the fights however. In early 1921 he became a deputy commander of the 43rd Infantry Regiment, and then briefly served as a company leader within the 4th Infantry Regiment. In that role he took part in the infamous riots in Kraków on 6 November 1923. Factory workers' demonstration turned into a riot and city fights erupted, leaving 31 dead and more than 100 civilians wounded. While Kostek-Biernacki argued he was in Kraków on vacations and did not take part in the riot, he was openly accused by some members of parliament and the press of attempting to start a workers' revolution with the aim of overthrowing the government. Because of that he was discharged from the army and arrested by the military police – a force he himself created within the Polish Army.

It was not until April 1925 that his trial before a military tribunal finally started. However, due to political reasons the tribunal never discussed his true involvement in the Kraków riots two years before and instead acquitted him of all charges based on procedural reasons. He was again accepted into the army in the rank of Major, initially within the 78th Infantry Regiment, and then as the commanding officer of the Przemyśl-based 38th Infantry Regiment.

=== Political career ===
During the May Coup d'État Wacław Kostek-Biernacki remained neutral, supporting neither Piłsudski nor the government. The press and the National Democrats opposing Piłsudski speculated, that Kostek-Biernacki might have been involved in the disappearance of Gen. Włodzimierz Ostoja-Zagórski, which however was never proven. In any case, around that time Wacław Kostek-Biernacki was made the military area commander of Brześć Litewski, first informally and then since 1930– officially. While neutral during the coup d'état, he was strongly supportive of the Sanacja movement and his former commander Józef Piłsudski himself. The new authorities of Poland did not forget about his merits either and in 1930 he was promoted to the rank of pułkownik (Colonel). During that period he also authored numerous memoirs and monographs on the activities of the PPS and its Combat Organisation, some of which remained best-sellers for most of the 1920s and 1930s.

Already in the Autumn of that year the Brest Fortress under Kostek-Biernacki's command became infamous in Poland as a political prison, where a number of leftist politicians had been incarcerated prior to Sejm elections, in what became known as the Brest trial and the Brest elections. According to various accounts, the fortress' commanding officer was particularly brutal against the incarcerated politicians, forcing them to do tedious and humiliating tasks, beating them and even staging executions without actually shooting them. While his actions resulted in complete pacification of anti-Pilsudskiite opposition, he himself became particularly infamous and often presented in the press as a man without honour and Piłsudski's bull-terrier. He was disliked by the officer corps and even the Sanacja politicians, whom he personally supported. In the end he was discharged from the army and demobilised.

This however did not end his political career as already on 1 July 1931 he had been made the voivode (governor) of the Nowogródek voivodeship, and the following year he became the voivode of Polesie voivodeship. He was seen as a tough man for a tough task, as at that time the region experienced constant attacks from Communist activists and Soviet spies, as well as acts of violence by the Ukrainian terrorist groups. As a voivode he supervised the creation and daily operations of another infamous political prison, the Bereza Kartuska prison. At the same time he also successfully petitioned the government for aid for the poorest region of Poland and started a tedious task of meliorating the Polesie Marshes, the least-populated area of Poland back then. He was also the chief initiator of creation of the Brześć Litewski-Pińsk road, the most modern road built in Poland between the wars.

=== Later life ===
Wacław Kostek-Biernacki remained the voivode of Polesie until the outbreak of World War II in the effect of the Nazi-Soviet Pact. On 2 September 1939 the president of Poland Ignacy Mościcki appointed him as Chief Civilian Commissioner (CCO), a wartime position at the rank of minister; a CCO was supposed to govern most of public administration on territories forming part of military operational area, except justice, railways and posts. His work as a CCO during the Invasion of Poland was short-lived and climaxed in a series of decrees issued around 10 September 1939; In this position, Biernacki issued a number of orders, including Order No. 5 on the militarization of the State Police on September 11. In addition, he was to be an intermediary between the Commander-in-Chief Śmigły-Rydz and the government, receiving drafts of legal acts from the Council of Ministers, which were returned to it after the opinion of Marshal Edward Śmigły-Rydz.

On the night of September 6–7, he and his office evacuated from Warsaw to Brześć. On September 13, the division into "operational" and "national" areas was abolished, which caused chaos in the areas of competence between the Chief Commissioner and the ministers. On September 15–16, Kostek-Biernacki was in Tarnopol, later in Kolomyia. In the meantime, he came into conflict with the administration, in connection with the treatment of Ukrainian prisoners. The Commander-in-Chief Śmigły-Rydz replaced the Commissioner with Leon Kniaziołucki, but after the Soviet Union attacked Poland, the directive did not come into effect.

On September 18, 1939, together with the Commander-in-Chief's Śmigły-Rydz Headquarters, he crossed the border into Romania, where he was interned until 1944. On September 30, 1939, the President of the Republic of Poland Władysław Raczkiewicz signed his resignation from the position he held.

Wacław Kostek-Biernacki spent the entire period of World War II in Romanian captivity. In the autumn of 1945 the then-ruling Communists of Romania handed him over to the newly imposed communist government of Poland. He was immediately arrested and imprisoned in the infamous Mokotów Prison. Waiting for his trial he spent 8 years on death row, initially together with a Nazi war criminal Erich Koch. Constantly tortured, he suffered from numerous diseases, but was deprived of any medical assistance or even contact with his family. It was not until 10 April 1953 that his show trial finally started. He was charged with "fascisation of life in Poland", actions against the "revolutionary movement" and "denationalisation of Belarusians and Ukrainians". The show trial lasted four days and sentenced him to capital punishment, later changed to 10 years in prison. His health however deteriorated rapidly, and on 9 November 1955 he was released from prison – 10 years to the day after his arrest.

Wacław Kostek-Biernacki, once a Colonel of the Polish Army and one of the highest-ranking officials of Poland's administration spent the rest of his days in poverty, searching for his son Leszek Biernacki, whom he met for the last time in 1939. Unknowingly to him his son, a member of the Home Army, perished in a skirmish with the Germans in 1943. Kostek-Biernacki died in Warsaw on 25 May 1957 and was buried in a parochial cemetery in Grójec.

== Bibliography ==
Kostek-Biernacki was the author of several books, including:

- Jak oni!" (1909) – short stories collection, fiction about revolutionaries, partially based on personal experiences
- "Na ulicach Warszawy" (1911) – as above
- Szlakami buntu" (1911) – novel, as above
- "Straszny gość" (1931) – collection of well received horror stories from Kresy, perhaps his most famous work
- "Ułan dyżurny" (1939) – memoirs
