= Volodymyr Kunanec =

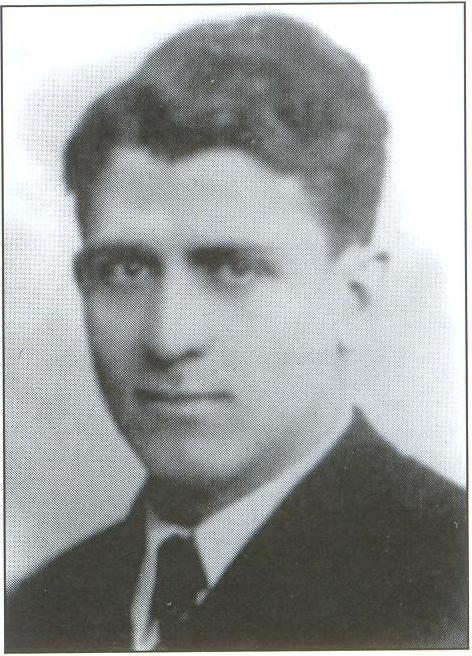
- Citizenship: (Austria-Hungary) Austro-Hungary; West Ukrainian People's Republic; Poland
- Children: daughters: Chrystyna (1938–1946), Marta (*1945)
- Awards: Bronze Cross of Merit (1947)

Volodymyr Kunanec (insurgent aliases "Inhul," "Prut," and "Reut") (Ukrainian: Володимир Кунанець; March 20, 1913, Nakonechne, Yavoriv Raion, Lviv Oblast — April 2, 1948, Buniv, Yavoriv Raion, Lviv Oblast) was an OUN activist, teacher, publisher, and a prominent figure in the Ukrainian insurgent movement of the 1930s and 1940s.

== Biography ==
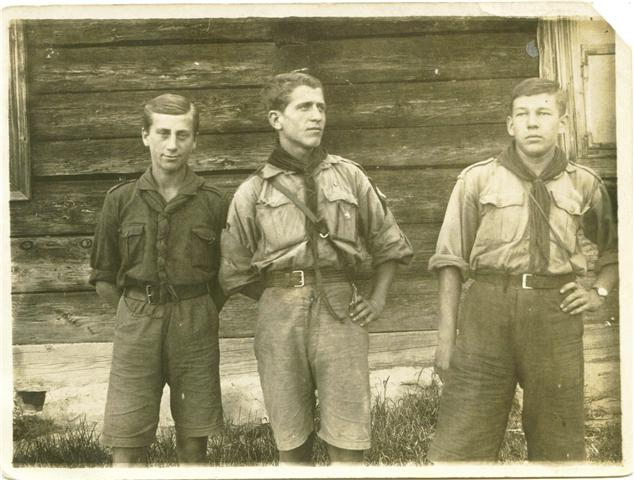
Volodymyr Kunanec (centre) at Plast Camp in Kosmach

He was born in the village of Nakonechne in Yavoriv Povit, into the Ukrainian patriotic peasant family of Dmytro and Maria Kunanec.

He studied at the Shevchenko public school in Yavoriv and in the Yavoriv Ukrainian gymnasium (since 1928 named after Osyp Makovei), was a member of Plast (XVII boyscouts group named after M. Drahomanov). Volodymyr's teachers included Dr. Mykola Chaikovsky, a mathematician and physicist, and Markiyan Terletsky, a historian and geographer who served as the director of the gymnasium from 1924 to 1926. Additionally, Volodymyr was taught by Omelyan Nazarevych, a mathematician, and Ivan Huculak, a classical philologist who also led a mixed choir. Of particular importance for the teenagers were the gymnastics lessons conducted by the legendary Ivan Chmola, one of the founders of Plast and the patron of the Plast organisation at the gymnasium.

== Educational work. Imprisonment. ==
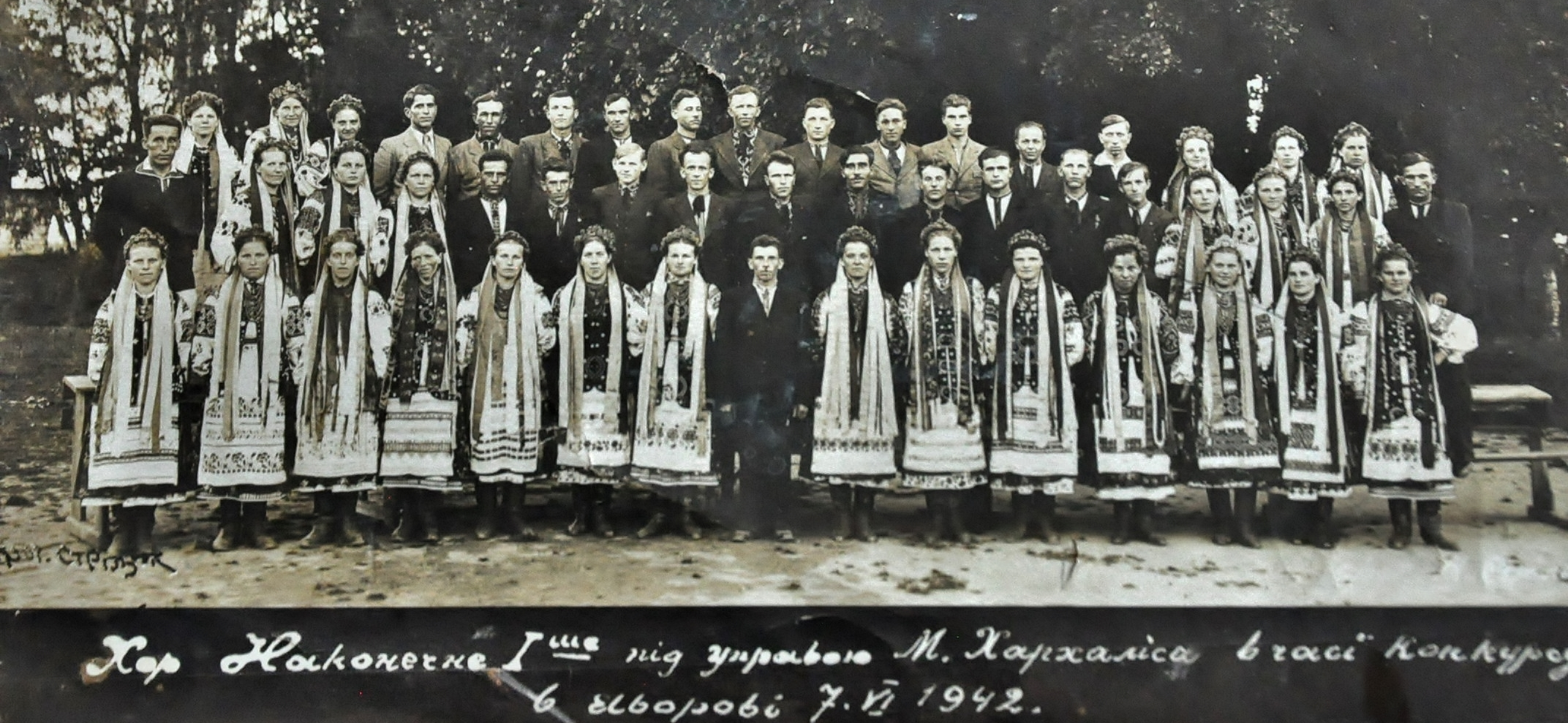
Volodymyr Kunanec (fifth from the left in the upper row) with the choir

After graduation, Volodymyr was actively engaged in educational activity in the Yavoriv region. Together with Nestor Romanec, Mykola Kharkhalis, his future wife Olha Panchyshyn, and others, he organized concerts, performances, festivals, and educational courses. Olha was the head of the local branch of the Ukrainian Women's Union. He belonged to the OUN, was involved in underground activities, and was a referent for the OUN regional leadership. As a member of the nationalist movement, he was persecuted by the Polish authorities: he was arrested more than once, and from November 1934 to October 1935 he was a prisoner of the concentration camp in Bereza Kartuska.

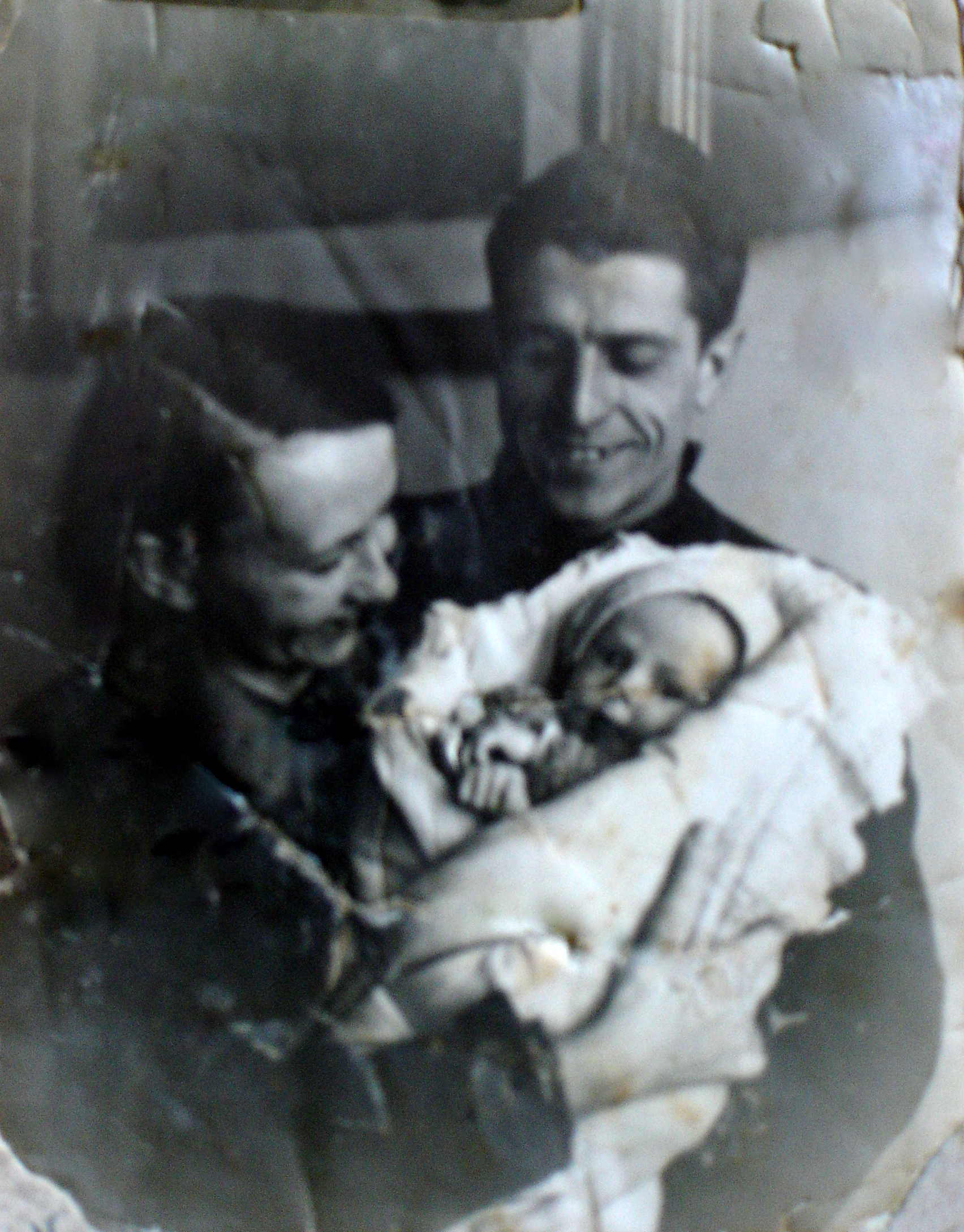
Volodymyr Kunanec after the release from Bereza Kartuska

== Publishing activities ==
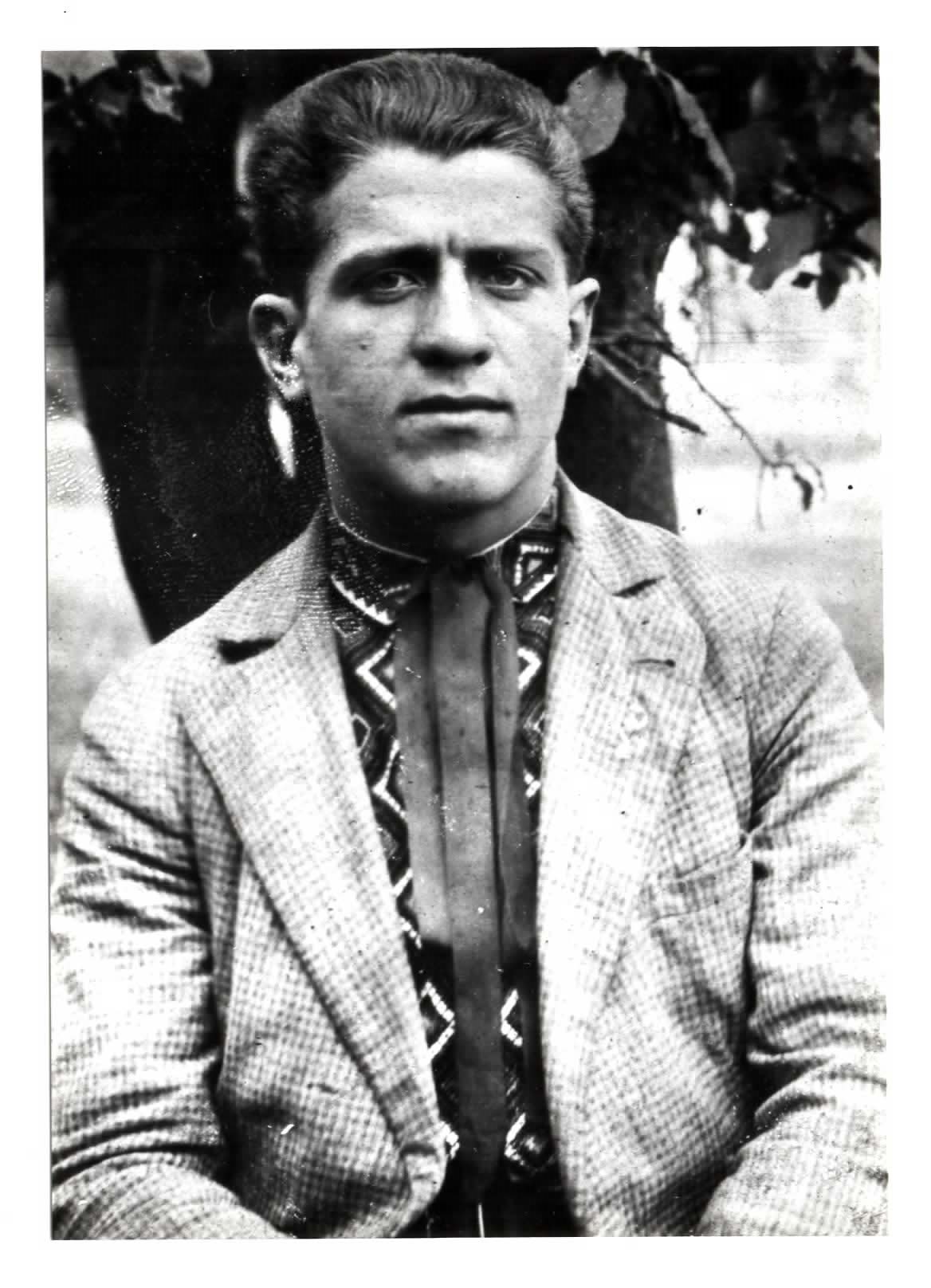
Volodymyr Kunanec wearing an embroidered shirt

At the end of 1935 (sometimes mistakenly mentioned in the literature as 1936), Volodymyr Kunanec founded the "Дешева книжка" (English: Inexpensive Book) publishing house with money sent by his father from America. Its headquarters — the editorial office and administration — were on the top floor at 1 Grodzickich Street (now Drukarska Street) in Lviv. The historian Petro Mirchuk associates its founding with the repressions of the Polish authorities in 1933-1934 against nationalist publications, such asr "Наш клич" (English: Our Appeal), "Наш фронт" (English: Our Front), "Розбудова нації" (English: Nation Building), "Сурма" (English: Trumpet), "Юнацтво" (English: Youth) and others, which were shut down. The new publishing press established the publication of nationalist literature, mainly for young people: from 1935 — the biweekly "Inexpensive Book" (ed. V. Sydorak), from 1937 — the "Samoosvitnyk" magazine (ed. R. Paladiychuk and I. Vitushynsky), the monthlies "Little Friends" and "Young Friends" (ed. B. Hoshovsky), from 1938 - the illustrated monthlie "Orlenya", as well as "Calendar of the Young Ukrainian".

The most popular publication was the newspaper "Down with Bolshevism" (published in December 1937 — May 1938, editor Ivan Mitringa), which in the literature is sometimes mistakenly called the magazine "Anti-Bolshevik". It was in this newspaper that the slogan "Freedom for the people! Freedom for the man!" was first heard, and it positioned itself as "an organ for coordinating a common opinion among all the peoples enslaved by Moscow."

The publishing house's publications were very popular, especially "Samoosvitnyk", "Inexpensive Book" and "Down with Bolshevism". The latter was also shipped to Volhynia and even to Eastern Ukraine. "Samoosvitnyk" and "Inexpensive Book" with easy read articles from various branches of science and knowledge also sold out every month in thousands of copies.

However, the regional leadership of the OUN, as Petro Mirchuk notes, took a negative attitude towards the printing press, because the publisher and editors did not coordinate their activities with them. Therefore, the OUN network was ordered to boycott the aforementioned publications, “the publishing house began to decline, and eventually had to self-liquidate.” In fact, this statement contradicts the facts: “Inexpensive Book”, “Molodnyak” and “Orlenya” were published until 1939, and the last issue of “Samoosvitnyk” was published in August 1939, that is, immediately before the annexation of Galicia by the Soviet Union. Behind the conflict between the Regional Executive of the OUN and the leaders of the “Inexpensive Book” Press, actually, was an ideological dispute between Stepan Bandera and Ivan Mitringa. The latter sought to democratise the OUN and put forward ideas that were later implemented in the forms of the UHVR and ABN. Kunanec and Mitringa became close in Bereza Kartuzka, where they were imprisoned together for a year.

== Underground activities ==
On the eve of the Soviet "Golden September" of 1939, Volodymyr Kunanec, without waiting for being arrested, crossed the San River, into the German occupation zone, and engaged in underground activities. He was critical of the Germans and their attempts to use Ukrainian nationalists for their own purposes. In June 1941, he returned to Yavoriv region and headed the district leadership of the OUN, and later became the supra-district leader.

At the same time, Volodymyr Kunanec graduated from teacher education programme at the Yavoriv Seminary (1944) and became the director of a school in his native village. His wife was also a teacher. During the holidays, a kindergarten he organized operated at the school. As a teacher, he strongly encouraged young people to study and organised various courses in the Yavoriv region. Kunanec-Prut did not approve of the recruitment of Ukrainian youth into the "Galicia" Division and in the summer of 1944, he organized the "Pereyaslavy" insurgent camp with the support of forces of one district. All its participants received proper training in the military leadership schools and courses. After the Germans retreated, he organised the Ukrainian underground in Lviv. In 1946, Volodymyr Kunanec was appointed leader of the OUN of the Horodotsk district (another name is Lviv rural district).

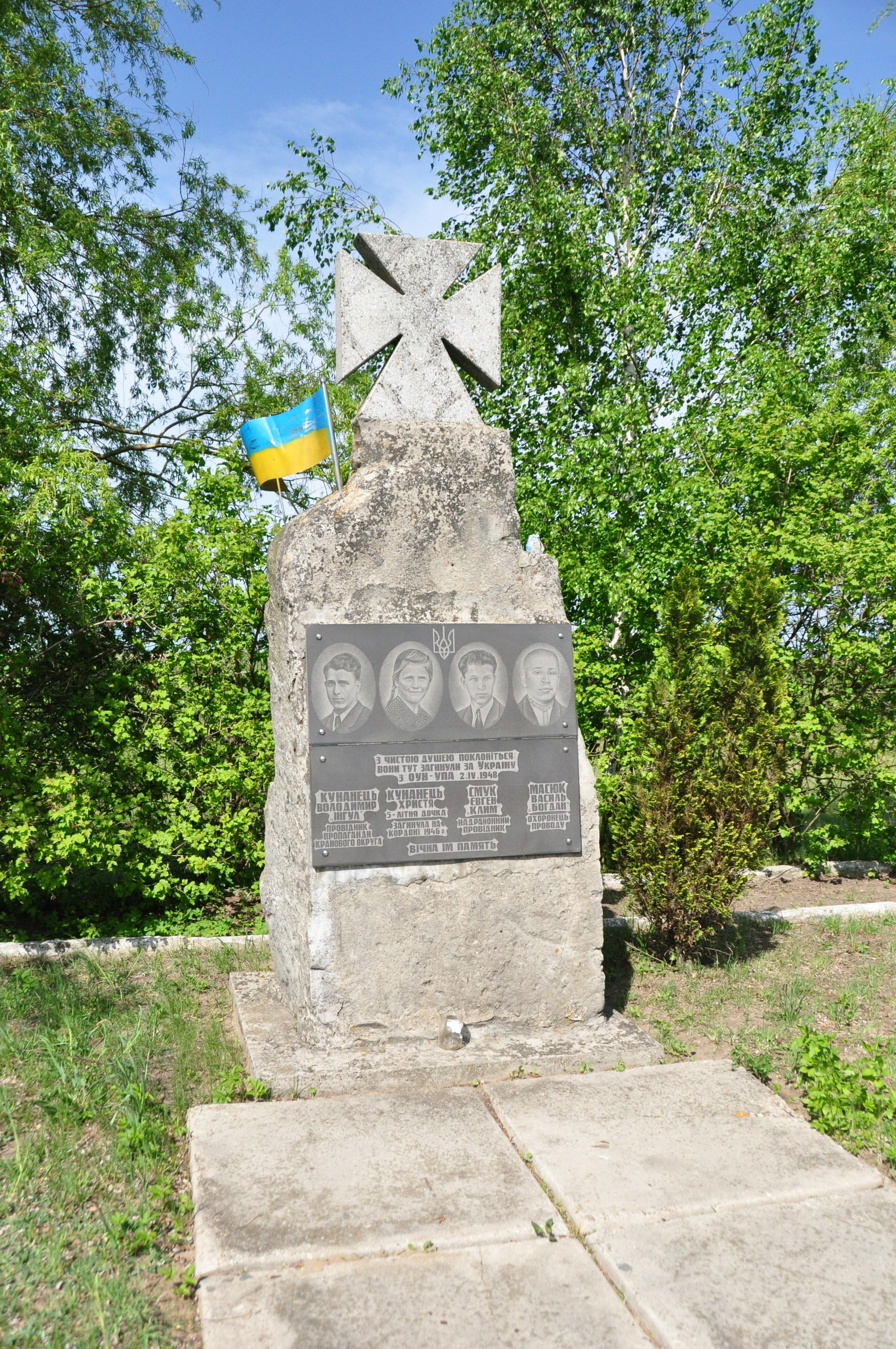

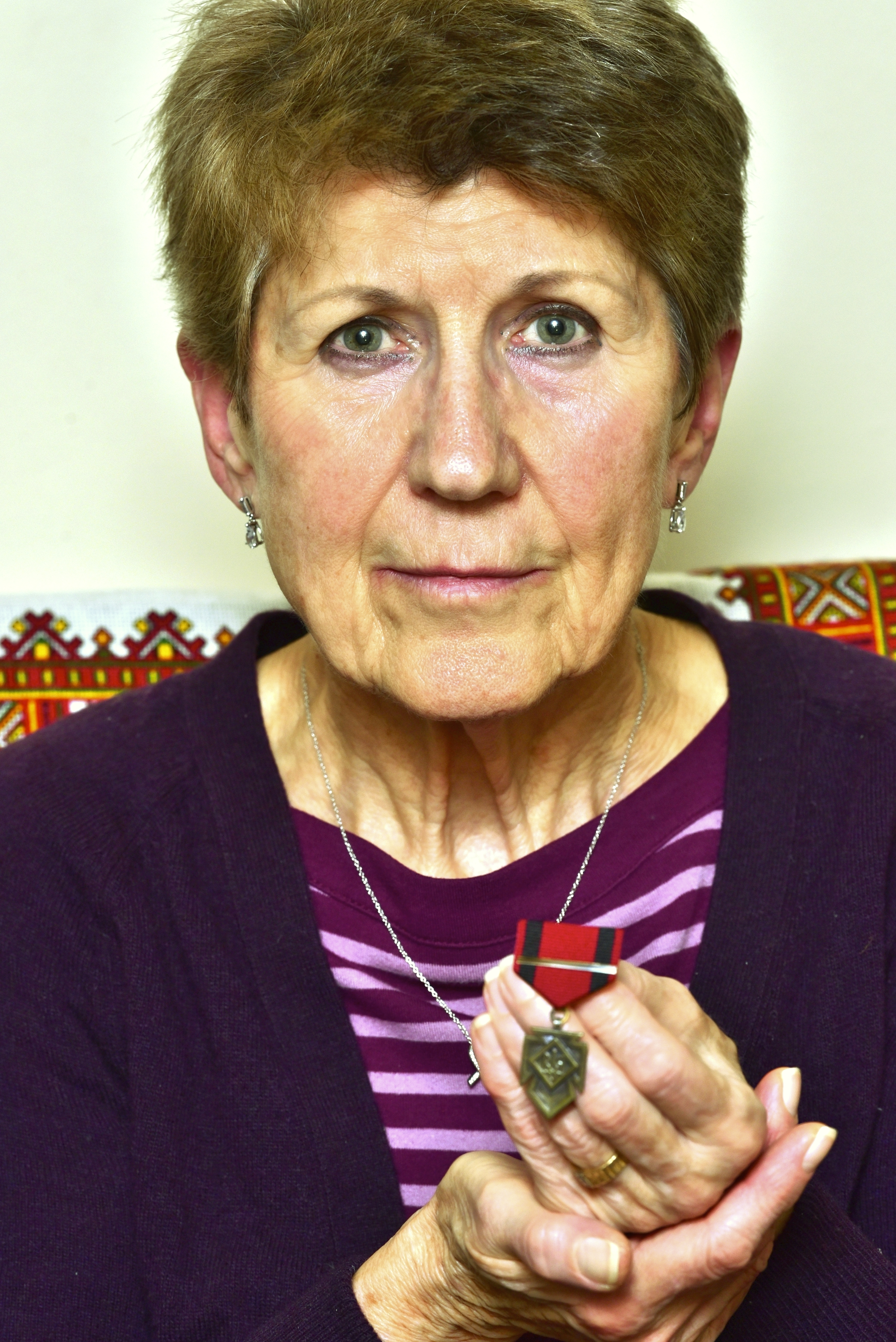
Marta Brown (Kunanec) with the medal of her father Volodymyr Kunanec, 2017

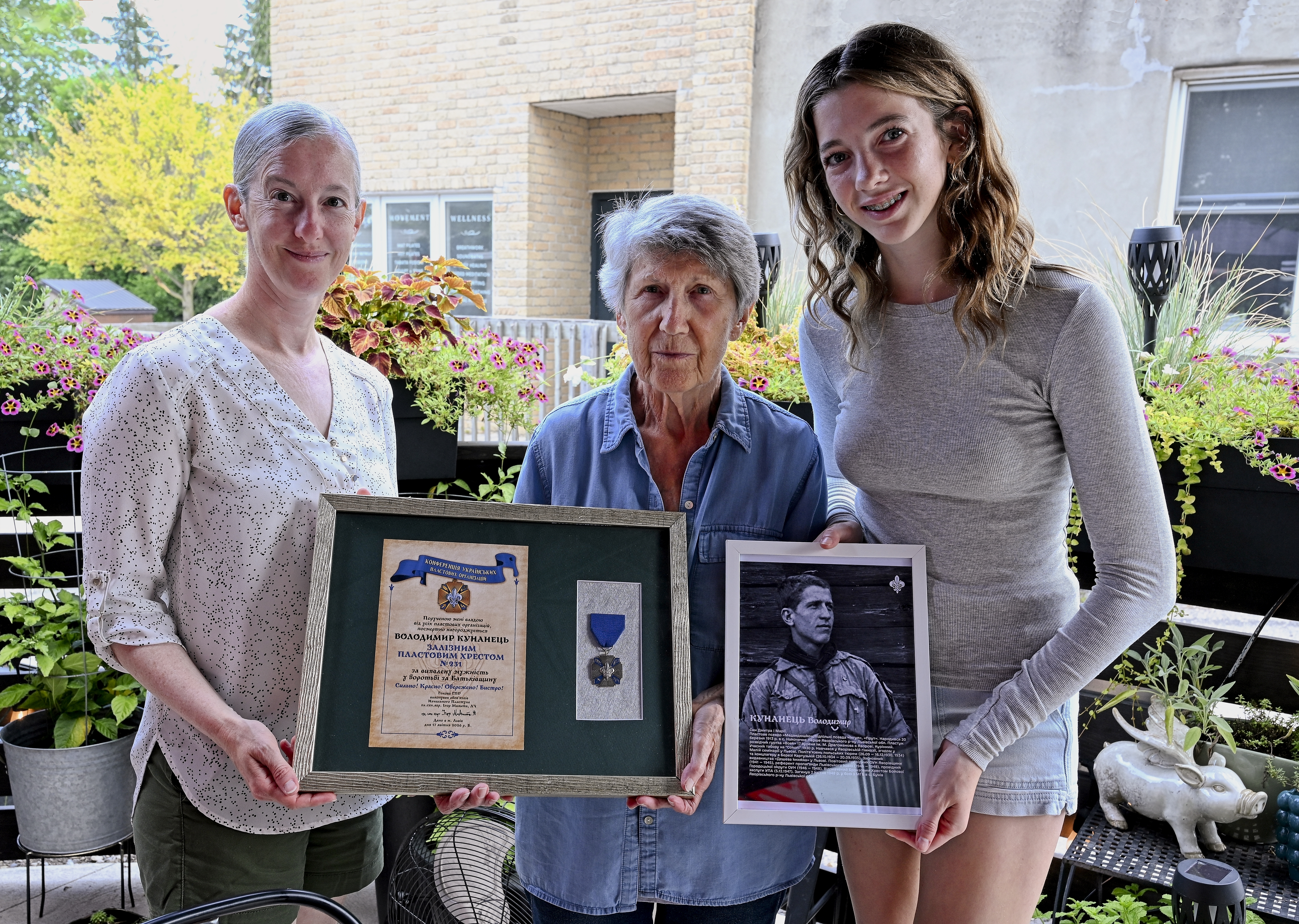
Marta Brown (Kunanec) with her daughter Andrea and granddaughter Briaanna holding the Plast award and the portrait of Volodymyr Kunanec. Kincardine, Ontario, 2026

== Death ==
Volodymyr Kunanec's life was cut short: on April 2, 1948, when he had just turned 35, he, together with the regional leader of the OUN of Yavoriv region E. Smuk and guard V. Masyuk, died near the village of Buniv in his native Yavoriv region in a clash with an MGB unit. Symbolic crosses have been erected at the site of the deaths of the insurgents, in the field between Buniv and Ivanyky, and a symbolic grave with the names and images of Volodymyr Kunanec, Yevhen Smuk, Vasyl Masyuk, and Volodymyr Kunanec's 5-year-old daughter Chrystyna, who was killed by Russians while crossing the border in 1946, has been erected on a hill near the road.

== Awards ==
- According to the Order of the Main Military Staff of the UPA No. 3/47 dated 5.12.1947, the head of the Lviv District Leadership of the OUN, Volodymyr Kunanec, "Inhul", was awarded the Bronze Cross of Merit of the UPA.

== Commemoration ==
- On November 5, 2017, on behalf of the Coordination Council for the Commemoration of the Awarded Knights of the OUN and UPA in the city of Yavoriv, Lviv region, the Bronze Cross of Merit of the UPA (No. 023) was presented to Marta Kunanec, the youngest daughter of Volodymyr Kunanec ("Inhul").
- On April 17, 2026, he was awarded the Plast Iron Cross (No. 231) from the Conference of Plast Organisations.

== Literature ==
- Кунанець Володимир/Енциклопедія Львова. Том III. А. Козицький (ред.). — Львів: Літопис, 2010. — 736 с.
