= Skrbek =

Skrbek (feminine Skrbková) is a Czech surname. Notable people with the surname include:

- Lola Skrbková (1902–1978), Czech actress
- Milada Skrbková (1897–1935), Czech tennis player
- Oto Skrbek, Czech soldier and skier, competitor in the 1948 Winter Olympics (military patrol)
- Pavel Skrbek (born 1978), Czech ice hockey player
