= Polesie Voivodeship =

Former voivodeship of Poland

Coordinates: 52°07′06″N 26°05′46″E

Polesie Voivodeship Województwo poleskie
- Voivodeship of Poland
- 1921–1939
- Coat of arms

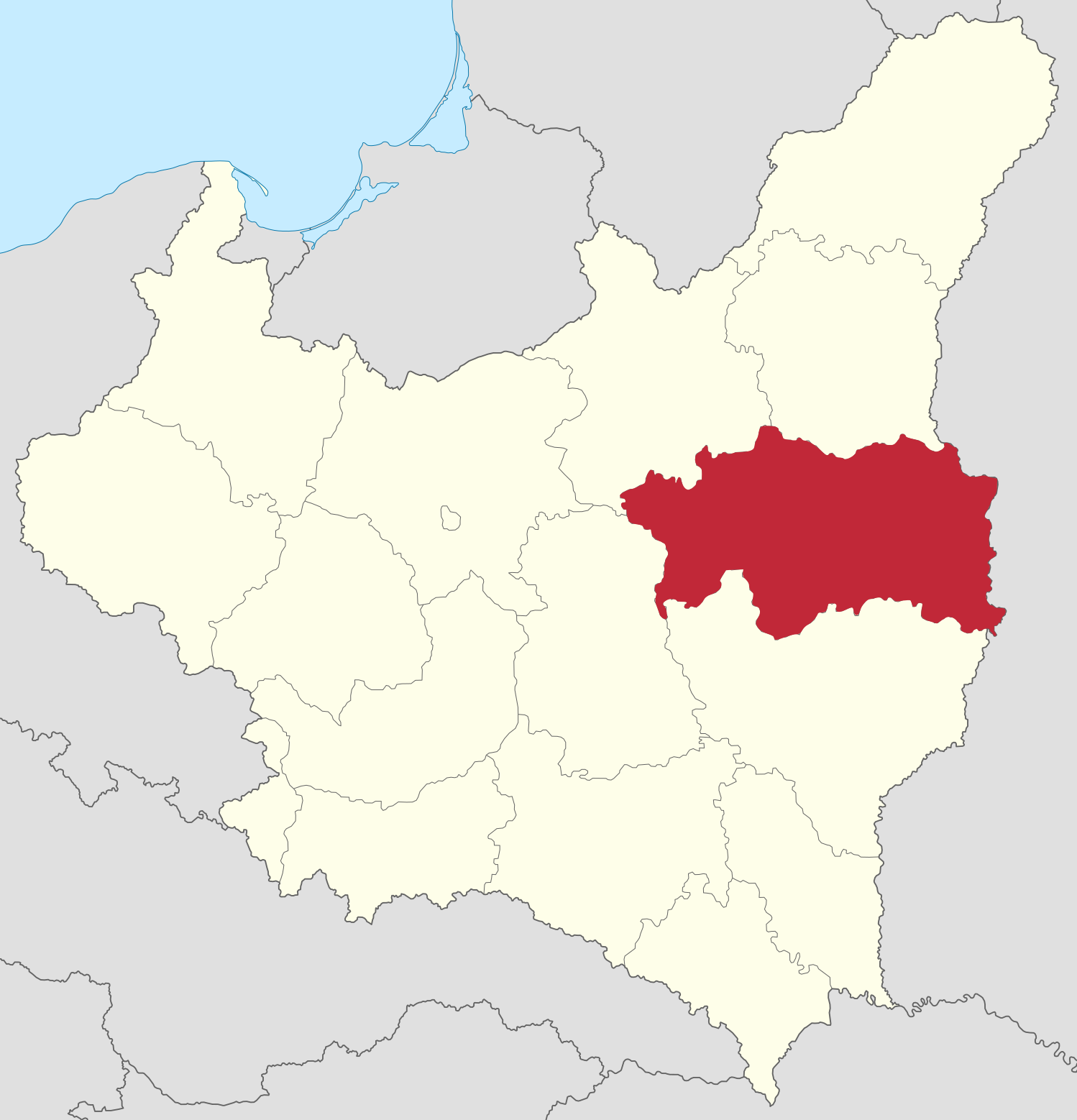
- Location of Polesie Voivodeship within the Second Polish Republic.
- Capital: Pińsk (until August 1921); Brześć
- Area
  - 1921: 42,280 km^{2} (16,320 sq mi)
  - 1939: 36,668 km^{2} (14,158 sq mi)
- Population
  - 1921: 880,898
  - 1931: 1,132,200
- Government
  - Type: Voivodeship
- Voivodes
  - 1921–1922: Walery Roman
  - 1932–1939: Wacław Kostek-Biernacki
- Historical era: Interwar period
  - Established: 12 February 1921
  - Soviet invasion: September 1939
- Political subdivisions: 27 / 9
Preceded by	Succeeded by
Polesian District	Polesia Region; Ukrainian SSR
- Today part of: Ukraine, Belarus

Polesie Voivodeship (Polish: województwo poleskie) was an administrative unit of interwar Poland (1918–1939), named after the historical region of Polesia. It was created by the Council of Ministers of the Second Polish Republic on February 19, 1921, as a result of peace agreement signed with the Russian and Ukrainian SSRs in Riga. Polesie Voivodeship was the largest province of interwar Poland. It ceased to function in September 1939, following the Nazi-German and Soviet invasion of Poland in accordance with a secret protocol of the Nazi–Soviet Pact of non-aggression.

== Demographics ==
The provincial capital of the Polesie Voivodeship, and also the largest city was Brześć nad Bugiem (now Brest, Belarus) with some 48,000 inhabitants (1931). The province was made up of 9 powiats (counties), and had 12 substantial towns or cities. In 1921, the population of the province numbered 879,417, with a population density of about 20.8 persons per km^{2}, the lowest in interwar Poland. By 1931, thanks to a government-sponsored settlement programme and the development of education, commerce and industry in the urban centres, the population had risen to 1,132,200, and the population density to 31 per km^{2}. The Jews constituted 49.2% of the urban population of Polesie, the highest in interwar Poland. They engaged mainly in retail trade, commerce and small industry.

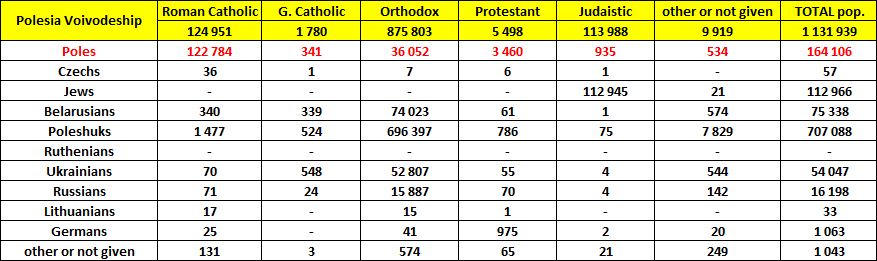
Linguistic and religious structure of the Polesie Voivodeship in 1931

According to the 1931 census, some 80.6% of the population engaged in agriculture. Most estates above 50 hectares in size, were owned by Poles (65.4%), followed by ethnic Belarusians (17.8%). The majority of inhabitants (62.6%) described themselves merely as “locals” (Tutejszy), and for the greater part were peasants of Belarusian and Ukrainian origin. Ethnic Poles made up around 15% of the population, Ukrainians (mainly in the south-east) numbered about 5%, Belarusians 6.6%, and Jews (mainly in towns) around 10%. Smaller communities of Russians also existed. The illiteracy rate was 48.4%, the highest in Poland and well above the national average of 23.1% (in 1931).

== Location and area ==
Initially, the area of the voivodeship comprised 42 149 km^{2}. However, in 1930 Sarny county became part of the Volhynian Voivodeship, thus the area shrank to 36 668 km^{2}. Even after this change, it still was the biggest Voivodeship of interwar Poland.

Polesie lay in eastern part of the then Polish state, bordering the Soviet Union to the east, Lublin Voivodeship and Białystok Voivodeship (1919–1939) to the west, Nowogródek Voivodeship to the north and the Volhynian Voivodeship to the south. Most of it consisted of the Polesie swamp - a flat, vast, sparsely inhabited area, with several rivers and streams. Access to some villages and hamlets required boats, especially in early spring, when the waters of the Pripyat and other rivers (like the Pina, the Styr and the Horyn) rose as the snow melted. In 1937 forests covered 33.3% of the Voivodeship (compared with the average for the whole country of 22.2%). The biggest lake in the voivodeship's area, Lake Wygonowskie, lay on the Oginski Canal. In the spring of 1939, construction of the 127-kilometer Stone Canal (Kanal Kamienny) began. The canal was planned to connect Pinsk with Klesow, which at that time was part of Volhynian Sarny County.

== Cities and counties ==
Brześć, the voivodeship's capital and biggest city, had population of about 50,700 according to the 1931 national census and around 55,000 in mid-1939. Other urban centers included Pińsk (population 31,900 in 1931), Dawidgródek (population 11,500), Kobryń (population 10,100) and Prużana (population 6,500).

=== Counties of Polesie Voivodeship ===
Powiat (County)	Area (km2)	Population	County Seat	Gmina (Municipalities)
Powiat brzeski (Brześć County)	4,625 km^{2}	216,200	Brześć nad Bugiem	Dmitrowicze • Domaczewo • Dworce (1928<) • Kamienica Żyrowiecka • Kamieniec Litewski • Kosicze • Łyszczyce (1928<) • Małoryta • Miedna • Motykały • Ołtusz • Połowce (1928<) • Przyborowo (1928<) • Radwanicze (1928<) • Ratajczyce • Turna • Wielkoryta • Wierzchowice • Wojska (1928<) • Wołczyn • Wysokie Litewskie • Życin (1928<)
Powiat drohicki (Drohiczyn County)	2,351 km^{2}	97,000	Drohiczyn Poleski	Bezdzież • Braszewicze • Chomsk • Drohiczyn (Poleski) • Drużyłowicze (1928) • Imienin (1928) • Janów • Motol • Odryżyn • Osowce • Woławel • Worocewicze (1928)
Powiat iwacewicki (Iwacewicze County)	3,562 km^{2}	83,700	Iwacewicze	Iwacewicze • Kosów (Kossów) • Piaski • Różana • Święta Wola • Telechany
Powiat koszyrski (Kamień County)	3,243 km^{2}	95,000	Kamień Koszyrski	Borowno (Wielki Obzyr) • Chocieszów • Kamień Koszyrski • Lubieszów • Lelików • Soszyczno • Uhrynicze (Pniewno) • Wielka Głusza (Wielka Hłusza)
Powiat kobryński (Kobryń County)	3,545 km^{2}	114,000	Kobryń	Antopol • Błoty (1928<) • Dywin • Dziatkowicze (1928>) • Horodec • Iłosk (1928<) • Kobryń (1928>) • Lelików (1926>) • Matiasy (Matjasy, 1926>) • Mokrany (1928<) • Nowosiółki • Oziaty • Podolesie (Jeremicze) • Pruska (1928<) • Rohoźna (Rohożna, 1928<) • Siechnowicze (1928<) • Stryhowo (1928<) • Tewle (1928>) • Zbirohi (Zbirogi, 1928<) • Ziołowo (1928<) • Żabinka (1928>)
Powiat łuniniecki (Łuniniec County)	5,722 km^{2}	109,300	Łuniniec	Berezów (1922<) • Chorsk (1922<) • Chotynicze • Czuczewicze • Dobrosławka (1922<) • Kożangródek (1928<) • Kruhowicze • Lenin (1939<) • Łachwa • Łunin (1928<) • Łuniniec (1928>) • Płotnica (1922<) • Pohost Zahorodzki (Pohost Zahorodny, 1922<) • Stolin (1922<) • Sosnkowicze (1939) • Terebieżów (1922<) • Zaostrowiecze (1922<) • Dawidgródek (1922<) • Horodno (1922<)
Powiat piński (Pińsk County)	5,587 km^{2}	183,600	Pińsk	Brodnica • Chojno • Dobrosławka (1923>) • Kuchecka Wola • Lemieszewicze • Lubieszów (1926<) • Łohiszyn • Moroczna • Pinkowicze • Pohost Zahorodzki (1923>) • Porzecze • Radczysk (1922<) • Stawek (do 1928) • Uhrynicze (1926<) • Wiczówka • Żabczyce • Pińsk • Serniki ?
Powiat prużański (Prużana County)	2,644 km^{2}	108,600	Prużana	Bajki (1926<) • Bereza Kartuzka (lub gmina Bereza Kartuzka) (1932<) • Czerniaków (1926<) • Dobuczyn (1926<) • Horodeczno (lub gmina Horodeczna) • Kotra (1932<) • Linowo (1932<) • Maciejewicze (1926<) • Malecz • Matiasy (lub gmina Matjasy) (1925<) • Międzylesie (1926–32) • Mikitycze (1926<) • Noski (1926<) • Prużana (1926>) • Rewiatycze (1932<) • Rudniki (Chorewo / Rudniki) • Siechniewicze • Sielec • Suchopol (1926>) • (1926<) • Szereszów
Powiat stoliński (Stolin County)	5,389 km^{2}	124,800	Stolin	Berezów • Chorsk • Płotnica • Radczysk (1928<) • Stolin • Terebieżów (1928<) • Wysock • Dawidgródek • Horodno (1927<)

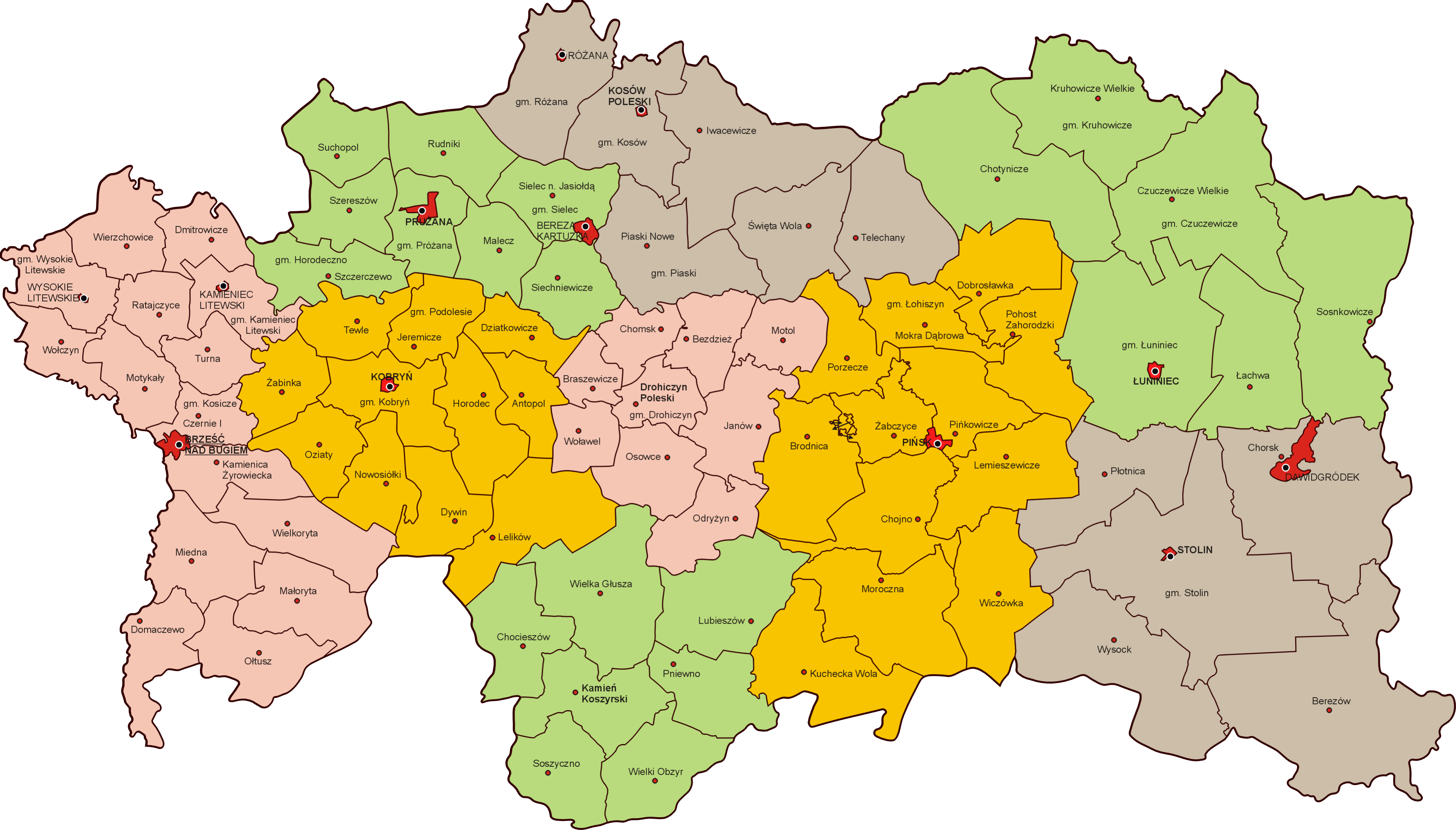
Administrative division of the voivodeship. In 1930, Sarny county (lower right) became part of the Volhynian Voivodeship.

The voivodeship was created on February 19, 1921 with its capital was Pińsk. However, after the citywide fire in August 1921, the voivodship's capital was moved to Brześć Litewski. Brześć Litewski was renamed as Brześć nad Bugiem ("Brest on the Bug" in Polish) on March 20, 1923. Between 1921 and 1923 the first administrative division of Polesie Voivodeship included: the Brześć county, the Drohiczyn Poleski county, the Kamień Koszyrski county, the Kossów county, the Łuniniec county, the Pińsk county, the Prużana county, and the Sarny county.

On January 1, 1923, Stolin county (powiat) was created from several gminas within the Łuniniec, Pińsk and Sarny counties. On December 16, 1930, Sarny County was transferred to Wołyń Voivodeship. On April 1, 1935, Kossów county's capital was moved to Iwacewicze and it was renamed as Iwacewicze county.

== Infrastructure and industry ==
Polesie was the largest voivodeship of interwar Poland, comprising 10% of the country's overall territory with an area of 42,280 square kilometres (16,320 sq mi). However, the Russian rule during the Partitions of Poland (ending in 1918), left Polesie in the state of economic collapse. Roads and means of communication were destroyed, along with most of the industry. Agriculture was underdeveloped. There were few rail hubs: Brześć (with 5 routes), Łuniniec, Żabinka, and Sarny. By 1937 the total length of railroads within voivodeship grew to 1,063 km, while rail density was 2.9 km per 100 km^{2} (the lowest in the country). The number of people employed in trades was 38,400 in 12,800 enterprises. Improvements in the socio-economic situation of the ethnically Belarusian peasantry were very slow. Statistically, ethnic Poles constituted 14,5% of the general population in 1931; Polish Jews, about 10,1% (or 114,000) half of whom (at roughly 49%) lived in the cities. Most of provincial economy depended upon the Jewish tradesmen, many of whom immigrated to Poland to escape pogroms in the east. Ethnic Ukrainian population of Polesie was 19,3% of the voivodeship, at 219,000. Persisting needs of continuous state investment (as outlined in the 1936 memo) were massive; the road-building programme required 7.1 million Polish złoty annually, with the complete lack of stone in the area. The projected cost of reconstructing waterways was estimated at 14.4 million złoty; processing plants and points of sales at 2.5 million złoty, dairy industry at 480.000 złoty annually, including 2 million złoty for education. In the opinion of local administrators, the economy of interwar Poland consisted of two parts: Poland "A" (better developed) and Poland "B" (less developed); the Polesie area was named by them Poland "C".

== 1931 census ==
The results of the 1931 census (questions about mother tongue and about religion) are presented in the table below:

Linguistic (mother tongue) and religious structure of the Polesie Voivodeship according to the 1931 census
County	Pop.	Polish	Belarusian & Poleshuk ("Tutejszy")	Ukrainian	Russian	Yiddish & Hebrew	Other language	Roman Catholic	Orthodox & Uniate	Jewish	Other religion
Brest	215927	23.3%	52.0%	8.3%	1.4%	14.9%	0.1%	19.9%	62.9%	14.9%	2.3%
Drahichyn	97040	7.1%	83.0%	1.5%	1.1%	7.2%	0.1%	5.9%	85.7%	7.2%	1.2%
Kamin-Kashyrskyi (Note: Kamin-Kashyrskyi County's population according to the 1921 census included 41,522 Ukrainians, 9,183 Poleshuks ("Tutejszy") and just 6 Belarusians. According to the 1931 census this county's population included 74,313 Poleshuk ("Tutejszy" language), 8,271 Ukrainian, 1,136 Belarusian and 250 Russian speakers.)	94988	7.0%	79.4%	8.7%	0.3%	4.2%	0.4%	6.3%	87.5%	4.3%	1.9%
Kobryn	113972	8.8%	59.7%	19.2%	3.0%	9.2%	0.1%	7.9%	82.0%	9.2%	0.9%
Kosava	83696	10.1%	81.3%	0.2%	0.8%	7.5%	0.1%	9.3%	82.4%	7.6%	0.7%
Luninyets	108663	15.2%	76.5%	0.2%	0.5%	7.2%	0.4%	12.7%	78.9%	7.4%	1.0%
Pinsk	184305	15.8%	67.5%	0.6%	2.4%	13.6%	0.1%	8.9%	76.0%	13.8%	1.3%
Pruzhany	108583	16.3%	74.1%	0.3%	0.5%	8.7%	0.1%	15.0%	75.5%	8.7%	0.8%
Stolin	124765	14.8%	72.1%	2.1%	1.8%	8.7%	0.5%	5.5%	84.4%	8.7%	1.4%
Polesie Voivodeship	1131939	14.5%	69.1%	4.8%	1.4%	10.0%	0.2%	11.0%	77.5%	10.1%	1.4%

== 1939 and its aftermath ==
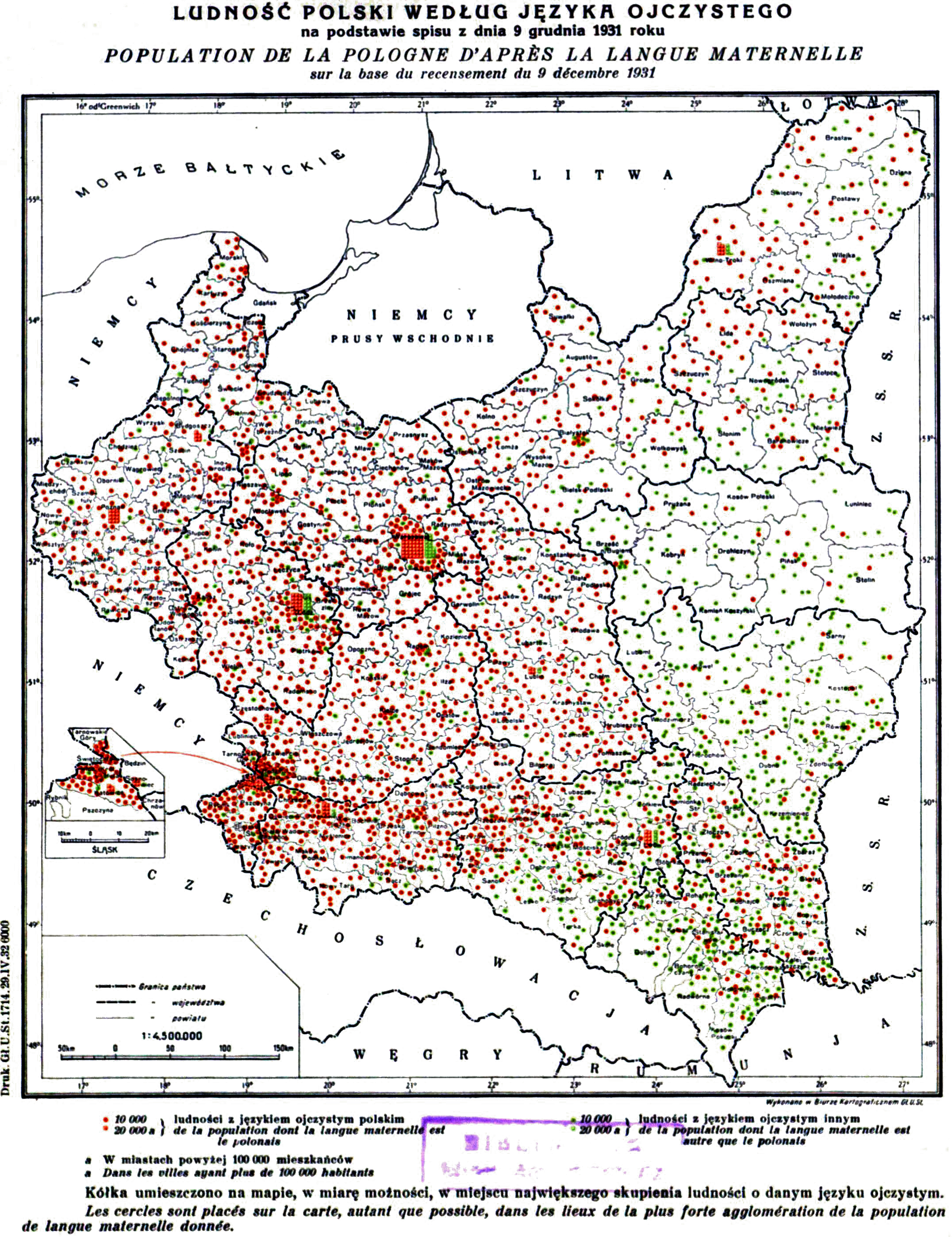
Mother tongue in Poland, based on the 1931 Polish census (original).

The Soviet Union invaded eastern Poland on September 17, 1939, two and a half weeks after the Nazi German invasion of Poland of September 1. A two-pronged attack was decided in the secret Molotov–Ribbentrop Pact signed by the USSR with Germany in August 1939. As the bulk of the Polish Army had concentrated in the west of the country to fight the Germans, the Soviets met with limited resistance and their troops quickly moved westwards until they reached Brześć on September 22, where they met with the invading German army, and held the joint victory parade.

The Soviet authorities who occupied the Polesie Voivodeship dismantled the Polish administration and formally annexed what became known as West Belarus into the Soviet Union, dividing it between the Ukrainian Soviet Socialist Republic and the Byelorussian Soviet Socialist Republic (Polesia Region). Following the Tehran Conference of 1943, Joseph Stalin insisted in 1945 on redrawing Poland's borders with Western approval. The Soviets forcibly resettled the Polish population of the province to the west, and the prewar voivodeship area became part of the Soviet Union for the next sixty years. As of 2009 most of the former Polesie Voivodeship (including Brześć and Pińsk) belongs to the sovereign Belarus; only the southern part of it belongs to Ukraine (Kamień county and the southern parts of Pińsk and Stolin counties). Nearly all of the Belarusian part of Polesie Voivodeship is part of Brest Region, except Sosnkowicze (now Lenin) gmina of Łuniniec powiat with villages of Cimoszewicze ve Milewicze, it was part of Pinsk Oblast between 1939 and 1941 and 1944 and 1954 and Brest Region between 1954 and 1960 as a raion (Its centre was moved to Mikashevichy on 8 June) before transferring to Žytkavičy Rajon of Gomel Region due to dissolving Lenin one on 20 January 1960.

== Voivodes ==
- Walery Roman 14 March 1921 – 3 May 1922
- Stanisław Józef Downarowicz 18 May 1922 – 2 October 1924
- Kazimierz Młodzianowski 4 October 1924 – 5 May 1926
- Vacant 5 May 1926 – 14 July 1926
- Jan Krahelski 14 July 1926 – 8 September 1932 (acting to 23 December 1926)
- Wacław Kostek-Biernacki 8 September 1932 – 2 September 1939
- Jerzy Albin de Tramecourt 17 February 1937 – 7 September 1937 (acting for Kostek-Biernacki)

== Literature ==
- Svetlana Boltovskaja u. a.; Eva Gerhards (Hrsg.): Tschernobyl: Expeditionen in ein verlorenes Land. Städtische Museen Freiburg im Breisgau, Imhof, Petersberg, 2011, ISBN 978-3-86568-692-3
- Diana Siebert: Die ländliche Wirtschaft im polnischen und sowjetischen Teil des weissrussischen Polesien (1921–1939) – Ein Vergleich, Hausarbeit zur Magisterprüfung an der Philosophischen Fakultät der Universität zu Köln. Köln 1990.
- Diana Siebert: Herrschaftstechniken im Sumpf und ihre Reichweiten. Landschaftsinterventionen und Social Engineering in Polesien von 1914 bis 1941. Harrassowitz Verlag, Wiesbaden, 2019. ISBN 978-3-447-11229-1.

== See also ==
- Brest Litovsk Voivodeship
