= Aron Skrobek =

Trade unionist and journalist (1889–1943)

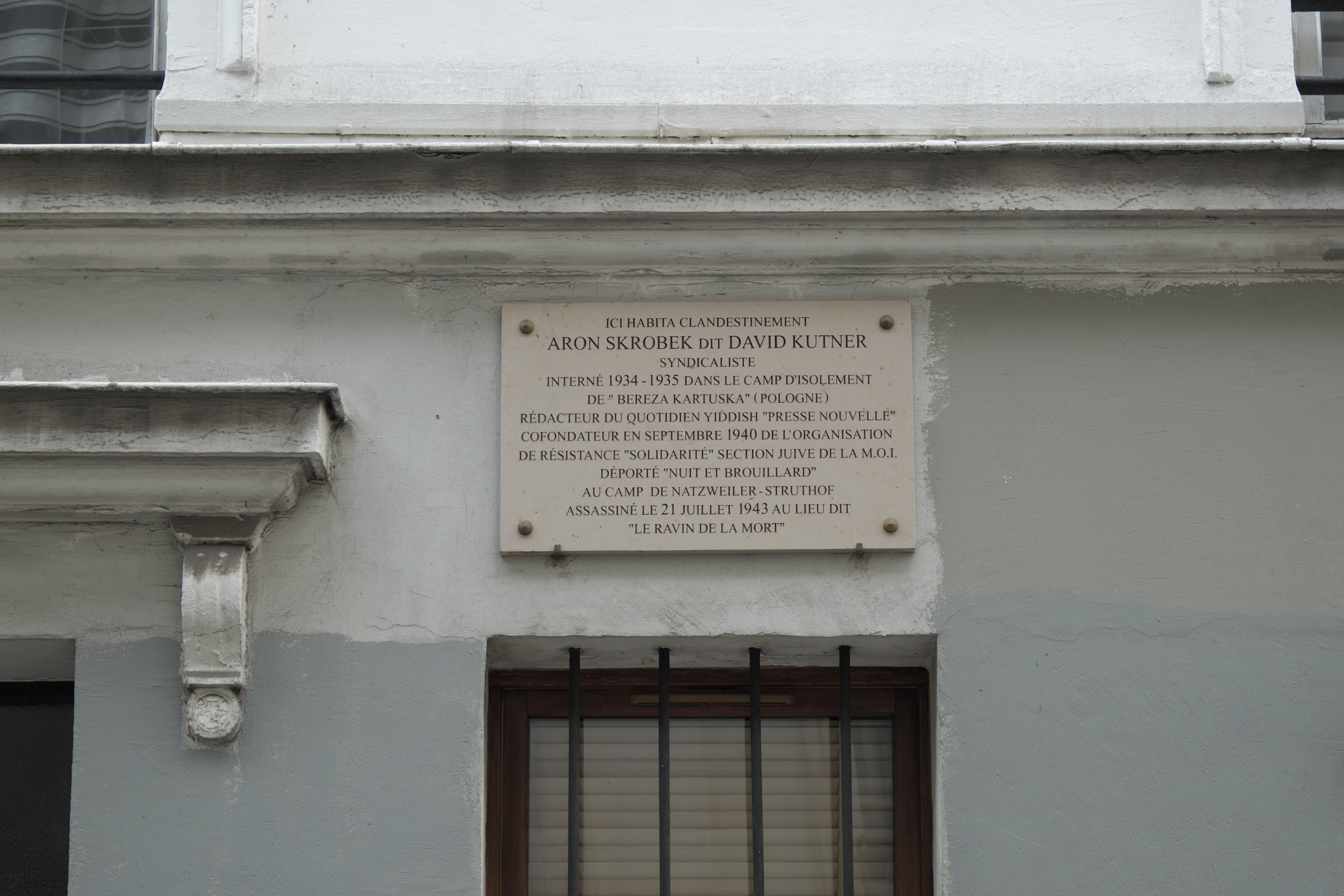
Commemorative plaque in Paris, Rue des Trois-Frères n° 4

Aron Skrobek (14 January 1889 – 21 July 1943) was a trade unionist and journalist, a member of the Jewish Labour Bund and the Communist Party of Poland, a pre-war political prisoner of the Bereza Kartuska Prison after he fled to France from the political repression in Poland he wrote of Pilsudski regime using the pen name David Kutner.

In World War II, he was active in the French Resistance in Paris. He was arrested by the French police in July 1943, handed over to the SS and executed at the Natzweiler-Struthof concentration camp.
