= Soviet annexation of Western Belorussia =

World War II event

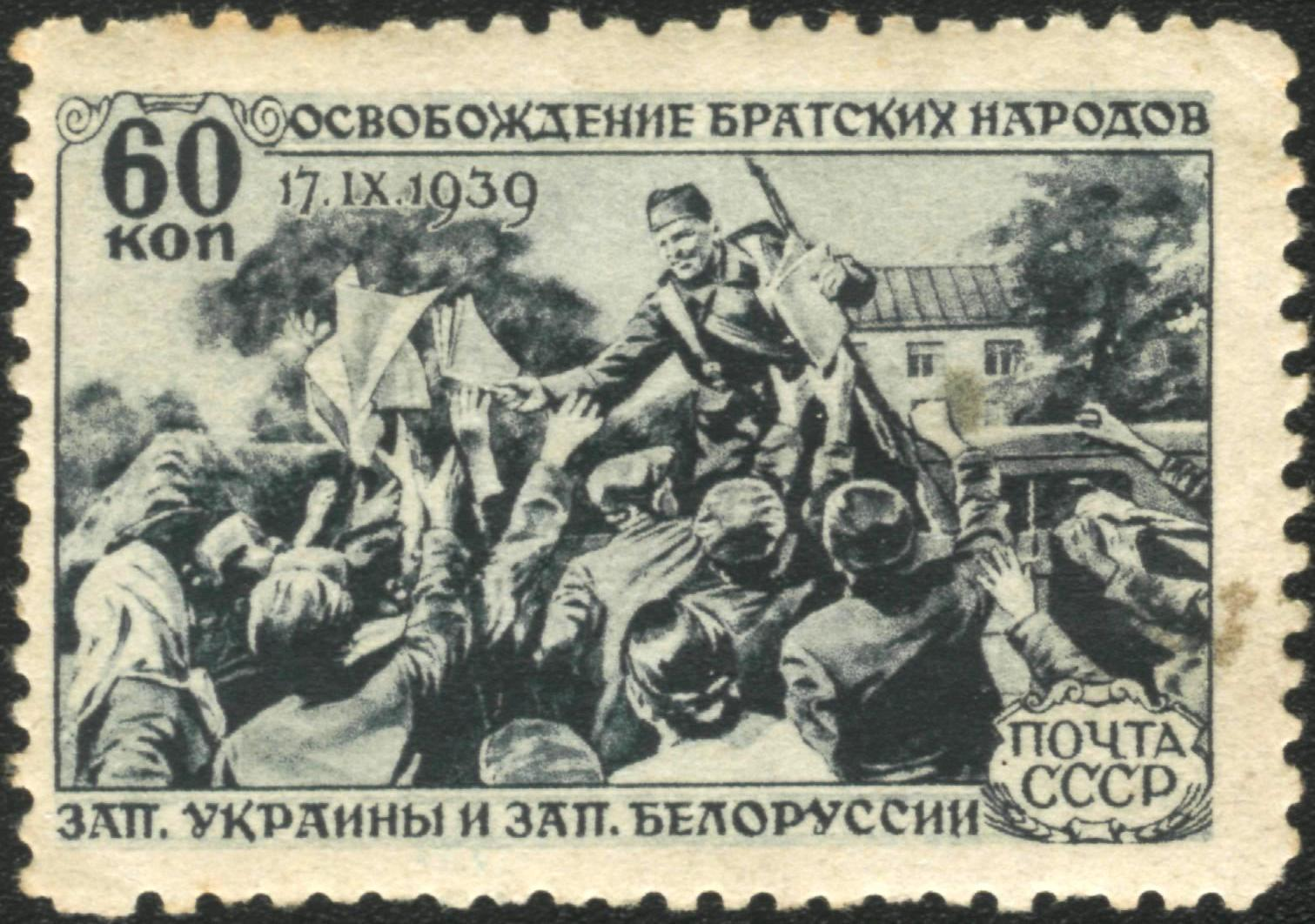
1940 USSR postage stamp celebrating the "liberation" of Western Ukraine and Western Belarus

On the basis of a secret clause of the Molotov–Ribbentrop Pact, the Soviet Union invaded Poland on September 17, 1939, capturing the eastern provinces of the Second Polish Republic. The eastern provinces of interwar Poland were inhabited by an ethnically mixed population, with ethnic Poles as well as Polish Jews dominant in the cities. These lands now form the backbone of modern Western Belarus.

The annexation of the territories increased the area of the Belarusian SSR by 108,000 square kilometres (42,000 sq mi) and almost doubled its population to 10.4 million people, of whom 4.8 million were newly incorporated.

== Annexation of eastern half of interwar Poland ==
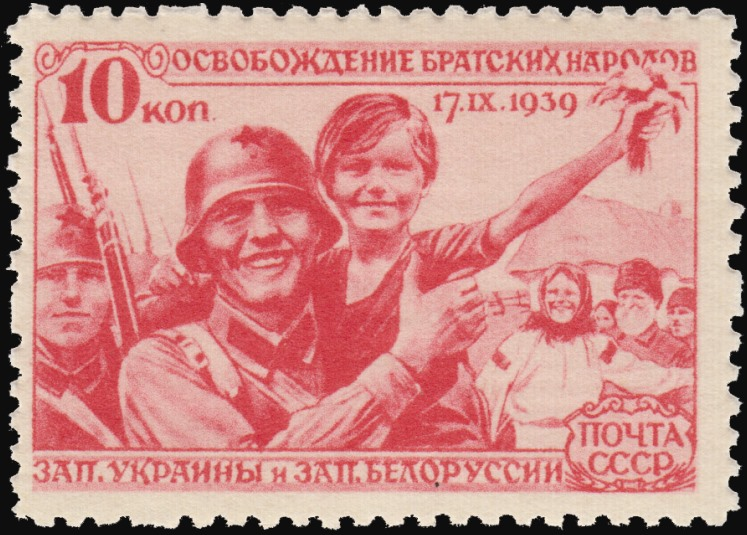
The liberation of Western Ukraine and Western Belorussia on a 1940 Soviet stamp

On September 17, 1939 the Red Army entered Polish territory, acting on the basis of a secret clause of the Molotov–Ribbentrop Pact between the Soviet Union and Nazi Germany. Soviet Union later denied the existence of this secret protocol, claiming that it was never allied with the German Reich, and acted independently to "protect" the Ukrainian and Belarusian minorities in the disintegrating Polish state.

Support demonstrations were staged by pro-Soviet militias. Immediately after entering Poland's territory, the Soviet army helped to set up "provisional administrations" in the cities and "peasant committees" in the villages in order to organize one-list elections to the new "People's Assembly of Western Belarus". The elections were designed to give the annexation an appearance of validity, but were far from free or fair. The voters had a choice of only one candidate, often a local communist or someone sent to western Belarus from Soviet Belarus for each position of deputy; the communist party commissars then provided the assembly with resolutions that would push through nationalization of banks and heavy industry and transfers of land to peasant communities. Elections took place on October 22, 1939; the official numbers reported participation of 93 percent of the electorate, 91 percent of whom supported the appointed candidates. On October 30, the People's Assembly of Western Belarus session held in Belastok (Polish Białystok) affirmed the Soviet decision to join the Belarusian Soviet Socialist Republic. The People's Assembly of Western Belarus voted unanimously to thank Stalin for liberation and sent a delegation to Moscow to ask for formal inclusion of the territories into the Belarusian SSR. The BSSR Supreme Council voted to approve this on November 1, 1939. On November 14 the law on the admission of Western Belarus to the Byelorussian Soviet Socialist Republic was signed at an extraordinary session of the Supreme Council.

The Soviet invasion of Poland was portrayed by the Soviet propaganda as the "liberation of Western Belorussia and Ukraine". Many ethnic Belarusians welcomed unification with the BSSR.

== Deportations and arrests ==
The Soviets quickly began confiscating, nationalizing, and redistributing all private and state-owned Polish property. During the two years following the annexation, the Soviets arrested approximately 100,000 Polish citizens across Kresy. Due to a lack of access to the secret Soviet and Belarusian archives, for many years after the war the estimates of the number of Polish citizens deported to Siberia from the areas of Western Belorussia, as well as the number who perished under Soviet rule, were only estimated. In August 2009, on the occasion of the 70th anniversary of the Soviet invasion, the authoritative Polish Institute of National Remembrance announced that its researchers reduced the estimate of the number of people deported to Siberia to 320,000 in total. Some 150,000 Polish citizens perished under the Soviet rule.

== See also ==
- Sovietization of Western Byelorussia (1939–1941)
- National Unity Day (Belarus)
- Soviet annexation of Eastern Galicia and Volhynia
