= Sovietization of Western Byelorussia (1939–1941) =

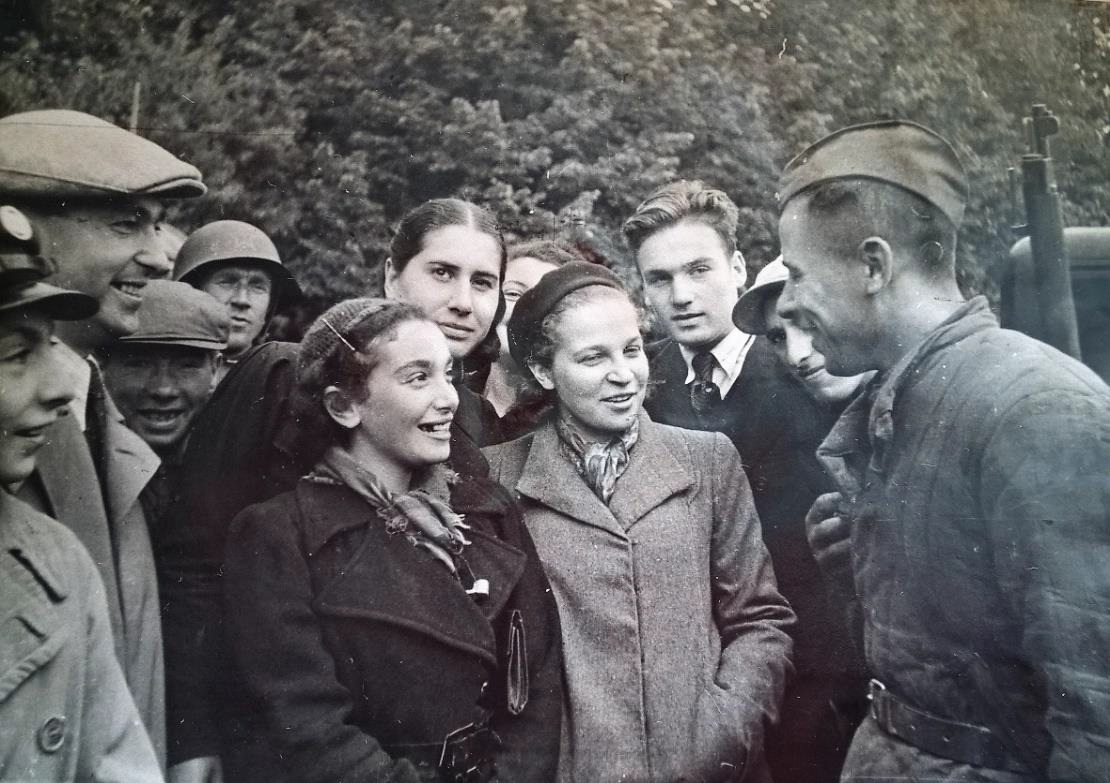
Residents of Western Belarus talking with a Red Army soldier, 1939

Sovietization of Western Byelorussia (1939–1941) was the initial period of establishing Soviet rule in Western Belorussia. It lasted from late September 1939 to 22 June 1941. In the economy, Sovietization was expressed in the nationalization of the few industrial enterprises in Western Byelorussia. The authorities did not carry out complete collectivization, but gave the peasants (mostly Belarusians) land taken from the Polish "osadniks". The wealthy strata of the population of Western Byelorussia were ruined in the first months of Soviet power due to the confiscation of surplus cash and bank deposits, as well as high inflation and the emergence of the "black market". Over 22 months, a network of Soviet cultural institutions was created in Western Byelorussia. Also, in 1940-1941, a Soviet atheistic educational system was created in the region, including universities. Local cultural figures (including many Jews who were discriminated against in Poland) were included by the Soviet authorities in the new institutions, receiving certain privileges, the obligation to participate in propaganda events and create in the style of socialist realism. At the same time, local cultural figures found themselves financially dependent on the Soviet authorities.

The Sovietization of Western Byelorussia met with much less resistance from the local (mostly Polish) population than similar events carried out during the same period in Western Ukraine. By arresting and mass deporting the disloyal population, the resistance in Western Byelorussia was almost completely suppressed by 1941. Sovietization was interrupted at the end of June 1941, when almost all of Western Byelorussia was occupied by German troops in two weeks. Sovietization was resumed in 1944 and did not cover the entire territory of the region, since on July 27, 1944, the “Agreement between the Polish Committee of National Liberation and the Government of the Soviet Union on the Polish-Soviet border” was signed in Moscow, according to which the Belastok Region of Western Byelorussia was transferred to Poland.

== Background ==
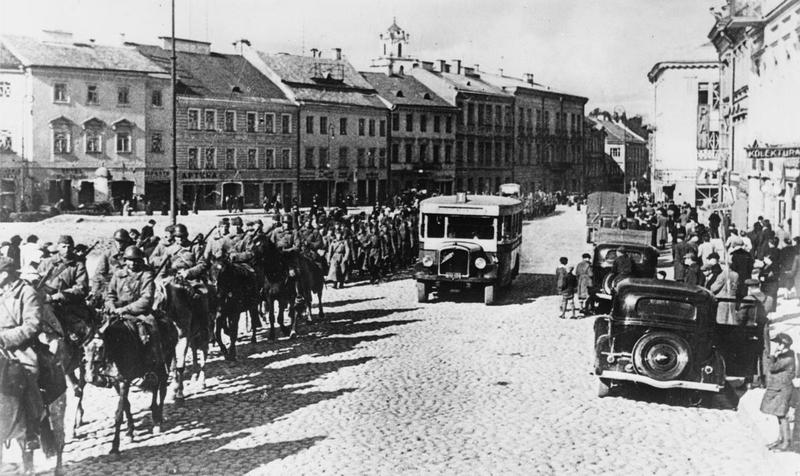
The Red Army enters Vilnius, September 19, 1939

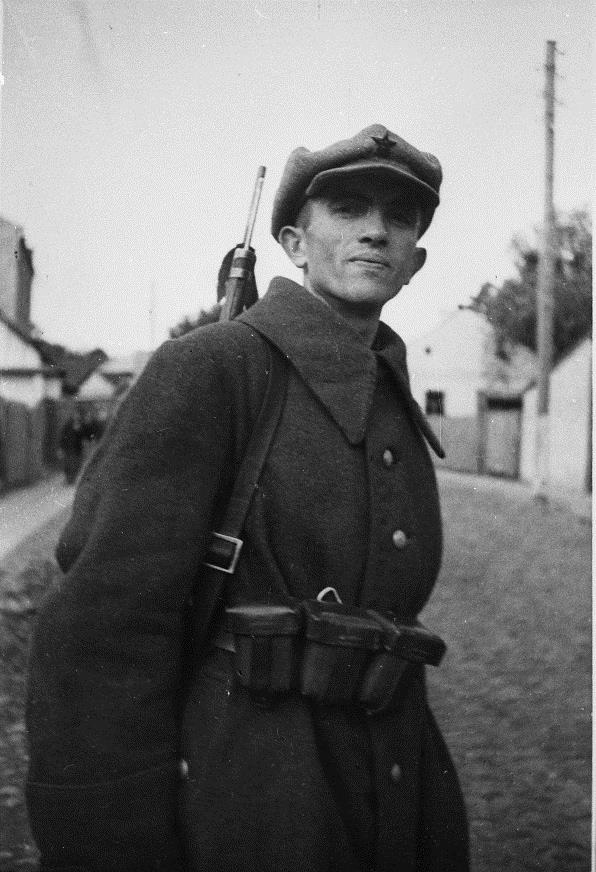
A fighter of the Oshmyany Workers' Guard on patrol, 1939

Western Byelorussia had been a part of Russia since the end of the 18th century. This was different from Western Ukraine, part of which (Galicia and Transcarpathia) was not part of the Russian Empire (except for a short period during World War I, when Russian troops ruled Galicia). Therefore, Western Byelorussia was more Russified.

Map of Lithuania within the borders of the Moscow Treaty of 1920. The map shows the division of the Vilnius region (shown in three shades of brown): the territory with Grodno, left in the Byelorussian SSR, is highlighted in dark brown, the territory transferred to Lithuania in 1939 is shown in a lighter shade, the territory transferred to Lithuania in 1940 is highlighted in the lightest shade

The second peculiarity of Western Byelorussia was that the region suffered greatly during World War I. During the Great Retreat of 1915, the territory of Western Byelorussia was occupied by German troops. The occupation lasted for three years, until the end of 1918. In addition, the Eastern Front line passed through the territory of Western Byelorussia in 1915-1918. A significant part of the civilian population (1,130-1,320 thousand people) was evacuated deep into Russia.

The few Western Belarusian cities were deserted during World War I. Thus, in 1919 the population of Brest was 4 times smaller than in 1913. In 1913-1919 the population of Grodno decreased by 54%, Novogrudok by 46%, Slonim by 66%, Pinsk by 45%.

The Belarusian cities that found themselves on the front line in 1915-1917 suffered the most. An example is Smarhon, whose population before the war was 12 thousand people. In the autumn of 1915, fighting between Russian and German troops lasted two months in Smorgon, and in 1919 there were only 160 people in this city.

The demographic damage to Western Byelorussia was so severe that the pre-war urban population of the region did not recover even by 1939. For example, before the war, 57.3 thousand people lived in Brest, and in 1939 - 53.3 thousand people, in Baranovichi, 30 thousand and 27 thousand, respectively. The only city in Western Byelorussia that managed to significantly exceed its pre-war population by 1939 was Lida (in 1913, 13.1 thousand residents, in 1939 - 26.3 thousand residents).

The German occupation had some positive aspects for Western Byelorussia in terms of creating infrastructure. The Germans built power plants in almost all cities (after liberation, many of them became municipal property). Also, under the Germans, new narrow-gauge railways and roads made of laid logs appeared.

The population of Western Byelorussia as of January 1, 1941 was 4,815,500 people.

The rural population absolutely predominated in Western Byelorussia. According to the 1931 census, there were 39 cities in the region. However, most of these cities had small populations. In 1931, 18 Western Belarusian cities had a population of up to 5,000 people, 12 cities had a population of 5,000 to 10,000 people, and 6 cities had a population of 10,000 to 25,000 residents. In 1931, only 3 cities were large (more than 25,000 residents, which distinguished them from the districts): Brest (47,500 residents), Grodno (48,500 residents), and Pinsk (32,000 residents). Białystok occupied a separate position, with a population of 107,650 people (as of September 1939). Thus, most cities were more like small towns, heavily agriculturalized. The development of even large cities was also mainly rural - only in the center were there brick houses, paved streets, and concrete sidewalks. For example, in Grodno, brick construction accounted for 39%, in Brest – 27%.

By 1939, the majority of the rural population of Western Byelorussia consisted of ethnic Belarusians and Poles. Moreover, there was a clear division of rural areas: Poles predominated in the western part of the region, while Belarusians predominated in the eastern part (adjacent to the old Soviet-Polish border).

A report on the political and economic state of the voivodeships of Western Byelorussia (compiled in October 1939) reported that Poles numerically predominated in the Białystok (72% of the population), Vilnius (59.9% of the population), and Novogrudok (52.6% of the population) voivodeships. According to the same data, Belarusians dominated in the Polesie voivodeship — 46.6%. Moreover, if in the Polesie Voivodeship the Poles were mainly settlers, landowners and officials, then in the Białystok Voivodeship the Poles were predominantly native rural residents.

In the cities, Poles and Jews predominated. For example, in 1931 (the census did not distinguish by nationality, but only by native language) 148 thousand residents (39.1% of the population) of Western Belarusian cities named Polish as their native language, 142 thousand (37.5%) - Yiddish, 25.4 thousand (6.7%) - Hebrew. In Białystok, the largest city in the region, by September 1939 Poles made up 51% of the population, and Jews - 42%. Thus, more than 80% of the urban population of Western Byelorussia in 1931 were Poles and Jews.

In Western Byelorussia by 1939 there was a fairly clear ethnic division of labour. The intelligentsia was mainly made up of Russians, Poles, and Jews (for example, in the Polesie Voivodeship as of February 15, 1932, 75.5% of the intelligentsia were Poles, 9.8% were Jews, and 9.5% were Russians), Jews predominated in trade and crafts, Poles in the administration (for example, of the 5,120 government officials in the Polesie Voivodeship in 1932, 88% were Poles and 5.8% were Russians), and Belarusians dominated in agriculture and unskilled labor.

The level of economic development in Western Byelorussia by 1939 was low. The population's income was the lowest in Poland, but much higher than in the USSR. Western Byelorussia was an agrarian region (with infertile lands) and small-scale manufacturing industry.

In cultural terms, in the pre-war period in Western Byelorussia, the authorities carried out Polonization of the local Belarusian population. Polonization intensified especially from the mid-1930s. On September 13, 1934, Polish foreign minister Józef Beck announced at a meeting of the League of Nations in Geneva that his country was ceasing cooperation in protecting the rights of national minorities. In the second half of the 1930s, projects for the colonization of Western Byelorussia by Poles and the Polonization of the local Belarusian population began to appear in Polish circles. Measures were taken to assimilate Belarusians. In 1936-1938, the Polish authorities banned Belarusian public organizations - the Belarusian School Society and the Belarusian Institute of Economy and Culture. In their place, Polish Orthodox organizations were created, such as the Pilsudski Society of Orthodox Poles in Białystok.

== The occupation of Western Byelorussia by the Red Army (September 1939) ==
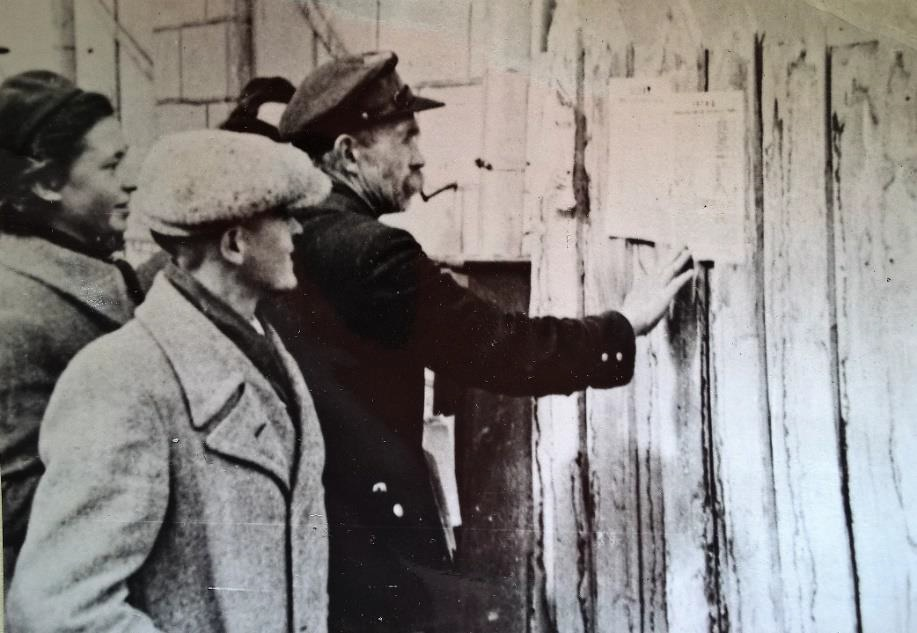
Reading the announcements of the Temporary Administration, Smarhon

On September 1, 1939, the Wehrmacht's Polish campaign began. On September 12, 1939, at a meeting in Abbeville, the prime ministers of Great Britain and France came to the conclusion that Poland had lost the war and that it was useless to help it. The Polish government had already moved to Brest on September 7, 1939, and from there to Kolomyia. The Soviet leadership at that time was waiting for the conclusion of an armistice with Japan (signed on September 15, 1939).

On September 17, 1939, the Red Army crossed the Polish border and quickly occupied Western Byelorussia. At that time, the situation was that German troops were on the line Sokole - Lvov - Vladimir-Volynsky - Brest - Białystok. Thus, by September 17, 1939, German troops occupied a significant part of Poland and entered the territory of Western Byelorussia. The Polish army was routed by September 17, 1939 (although some pockets of resistance still remained) and the capitulation of the Polish forces was a matter of weeks.

In the first two weeks of September 1939, the cities and towns of Western Byelorussia were repeatedly bombed by the German air force. The Polish air force was small (at the time of the German invasion, Poland had about 400 combat aircraft against 2,000 German combat aircraft) and could not protect these settlements. David Laskin, a resident of the town of Volozhin, recalled the incessant bombing:

we were glad to see [Soviet] soldiers, since we were exhausted from being in the bomb shelter day and night

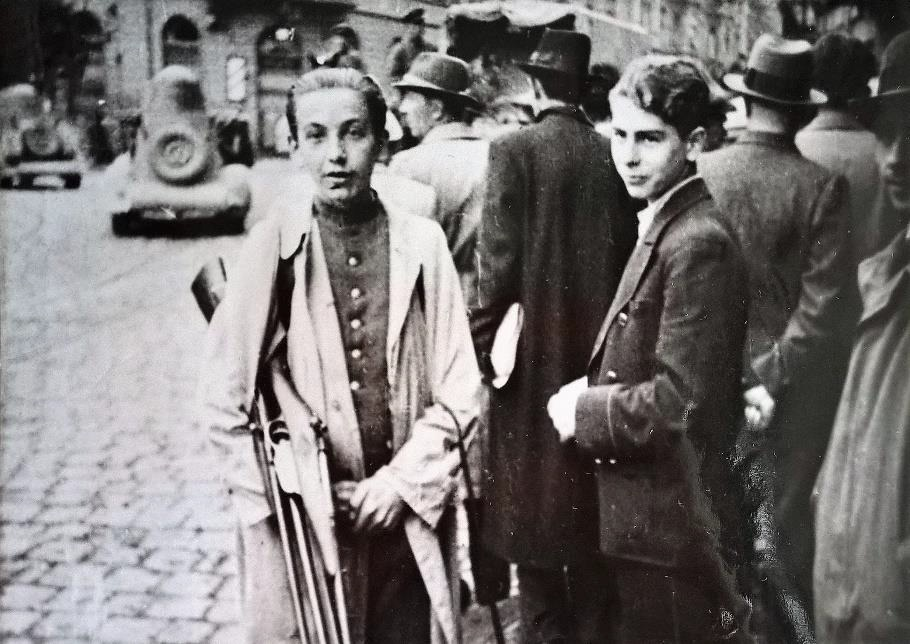
Residents of Białystok hand over their weapons to the Soviet commandant's office, 1939

The Polish units did not offer significant resistance to the Red Army (with rare exceptions). The number of Polish servicemen captured in Western Byelorussia was almost four times less than in Western Ukraine. The troops of the Belorussian Front captured 57,892 people (including 2,193 officers) between September 17 and 28, 1939. For comparison, in Western Ukraine, the 5th Army of I. Sovetnikov captured 190,594 people between September 17 and 30, 1939. Up to 18,000 Polish troops retreated to Lithuania, which bordered Western Byelorussia.

The local Belarusian and Jewish population helped the Red Army. In Western Byelorussia, local Belarusians organized several anti-Polish uprisings. For example, in Skidel, the rebels captured the railway station, but were defeated by Polish units and later helped the Red Army liberate this settlement. In a number of towns (for example, in Volkovysk), local residents themselves established Soviet power before the arrival of the Red Army In a number of towns (for example, in Volkovysk), local residents themselves established Soviet power before the arrival of the Red Army. In addition, Belarusian peasants used the departure of the Polish armed forces to loot Polish estates, sometimes killing Poles. Local bourgeois elements were also shot. For example, in the town of Shchersy, the local committee shot 6 spies and bourgeois elements.

The Political Directorate of the 3rd Army reported that "most of the landowners' estates in the Yedskaya volost were sacked by peasants". Political reports from the 10th Army reported that "settlers" were "shot in droves", and "the poor and middle peasants pay no attention to explanations not to touch the kulak peasants".

I. E. Yelenskaya, based on oral recollections of residents of Western Byelorussia (recorded in the 2000s), collected stories about how Belarusians greeted the Red Army with bread, salt, and flowers and erected “gates” (symbolic arches with welcoming slogans). The respondents characterized the Poles as arrogant people, hostile to other ethnic groups, who occupied the best positions under Poland. The respondents showed that there were acts of violence, but that it was not the Red Army soldiers who participated in them, but local residents.

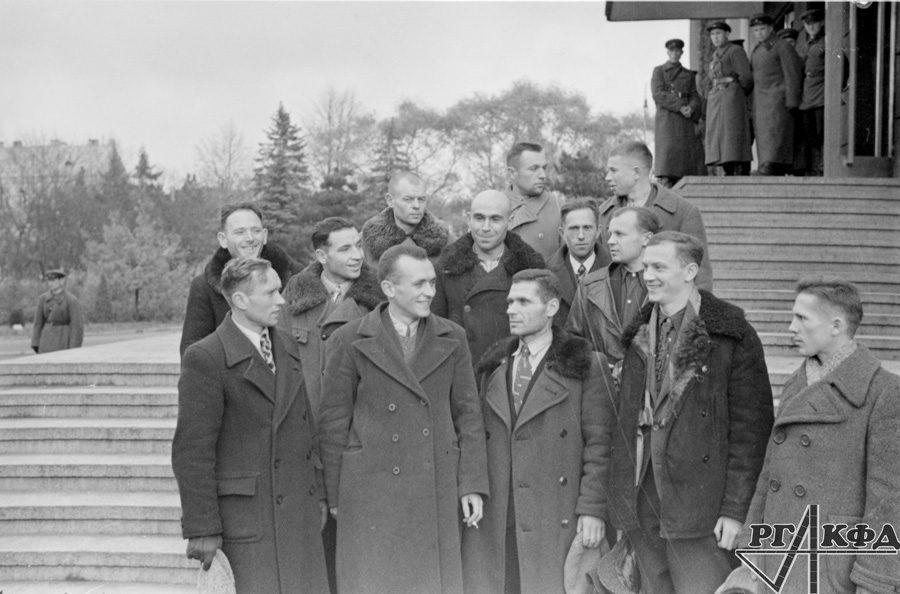
A group of former political prisoners elected as deputies of the People's Assembly of Western Byelorussia

The leader of the Communist Party of the Byelorussian SSR, Panteleimon Ponomarenko, having visited a number of settlements in Western Byelorussia (including Baranovichi, Slonim and Volkovysk), noted in a letter to Joseph Stalin on September 25, 1939, the Russification of the urban population, as well as the presence of hostile Polish resistance in the Belastok Oblast[45]:

The Byelorussian peasantry is in excellent spirits, supporting the Red Army in every way it can. In all these cities that I had to visit, I did not meet a single person who did not speak Russian. Everyone speaks Russian perfectly, even the youth. The peasants speak real Byelorussian… In Bialystok, the population greets our troops with more restraint, they know Russian less, shots are heard more often from around the corner, from the forest, at Red Army soldiers and commanders. In the cities there are P.P.S. - and working P.P.S. members - the situation is becoming more difficult than in areas where Byelorussians

German documents confirm that part of the local population greeted the Soviet troops joyfully. The chief of the operations department of the 206th Wehrmacht division, Major Nagel, noted in a report dated September 26, 1939 that on September 22, 1939, he observed “the reception of Russian troops in Bialystok with the jubilation of the proletarian population”.

The residents of numerous Jewish towns in Western Byelorussia enthusiastically greeted the Red Army. The head of the propaganda department of the Central Committee of the Communist Party of Byelorussia, M. M. Friedman, who travelled to a number of cities in Western Byelorussia from September 24 to October 26, 1939, reported in a report that their propaganda group “was greeted with delight in all the towns, thanking the Soviet government for liberation from the yoke of capital and the Polish lords…”.

In almost all cities and towns, the place of the fleeing Polish administration was taken (on their own initiative) by local Jews, who took power into their own hands (before the arrival of the Red Army).

Local Ukrainian nationalists, the Polesie Lozovoye Cossacks, also took up arms against the Polish authorities at the beginning of the war, and they occupied Drohichyn on September 22, 1939.

Despite the warm welcome, residents of Western Byelorussia immediately doubted that they lived well in the Soviet Union. The Red Army soldiers who arrived in September 1939 were dirty, thin, poorly dressed (respondents noted that some soldiers did not even have shoes) and begged local residents for food. The Red Army officers were dressed neatly.

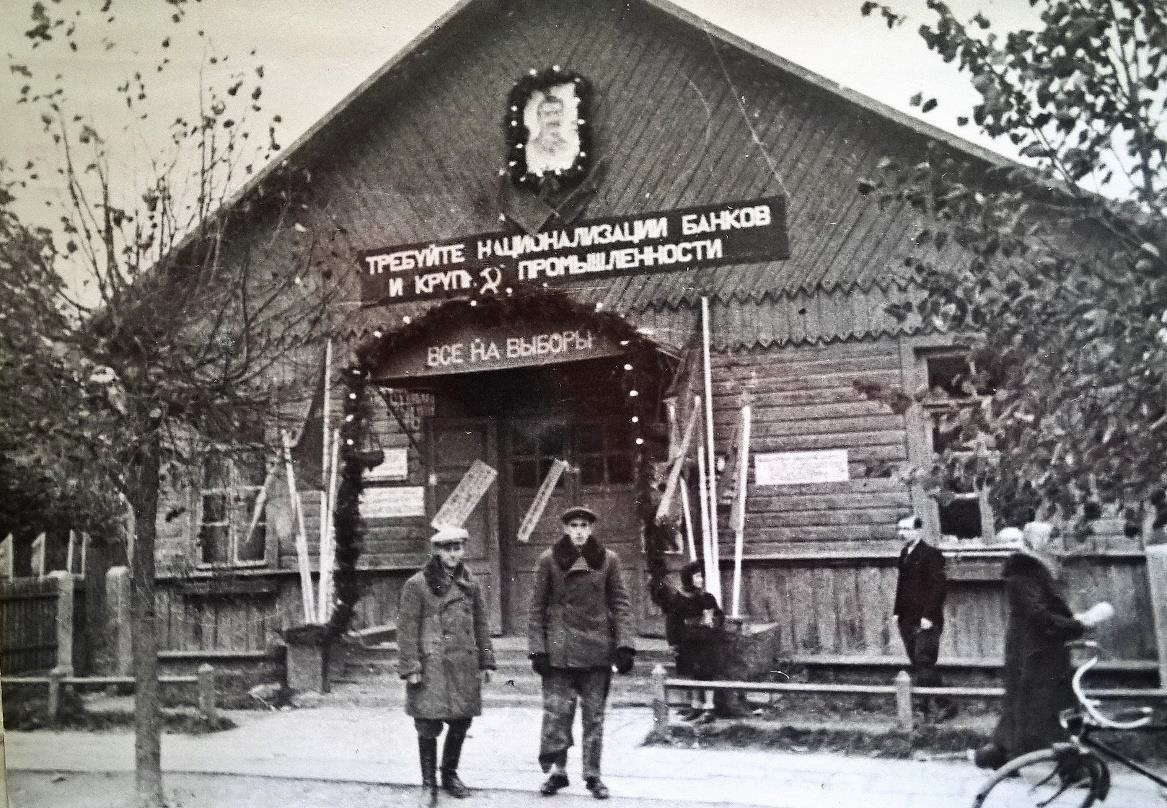
One of the polling stations in Baranovichi on the day of elections to the People's Assembly of Western Byelorussia

In September 1939, part of the population of Western Byelorussia was able to compare German and Soviet soldiers. Some territories of Western Byelorussia were initially occupied by the Germans and then handed over to Soviet troops. Thus, already on September 14, 1939 (i.e. before the start of the Polish operation of the Red Army), the Germans occupied Brest. Respondent N. R. Priluk recalled in 2003 that the Germans were "well-fed, fit, with good posture, excellently dressed", and the Red Army soldiers were "very thin, skinny, exhausted". The Germans, according to his recollections, threw packs of candy to children and shouted: "Rusish - good, polska - kaput!". For Belarusian peasants, good clothes showed a person's privilege. Therefore, it was difficult for Soviet people, dressed modestly, to earn authority among local residents. In addition, with the arrival of the Red Army, rumors began to circulate about collective farms. According to eyewitnesses, some Red Army soldiers told local residents that other detachments would come for them and create collective farms. Therefore, the Red Army soldiers advised local residents to sell their land.

The captured natives of Western Byelorussia were divided into two categories: those released and those sent to camps. On October 3, 1939, the People's Commissar of Internal Affairs of the Soviet Union, Lavrenty Beria, by order No. 4441/B, ordered that captured soldiers of the Polish army (Ukrainians, Belarusians and other nationalities) from among the residents of Western Ukraine and Western Byelorussia be sent home. This order prescribed that 25 thousand of the soldiers released from Soviet captivity be sent to the construction of the Novograd-Volynsky - Korets - Lvov road. Soldiers from among the natives of the part of Poland that had gone to Germany were sent to special camps. Officers, police officers and law enforcement officers were also sent to the camps. Thus, the overwhelming majority of mobilized residents of Western Byelorussia (from among the Belarusians) returned home almost immediately after the end of the fighting.

It was more difficult with prisoners of war from the Vilnius region, which was transferred to Lithuania in October 1939. Hundreds of these prisoners of war remained in the Soviet Union. An appeal from the Chancellery of the Government of the Lithuanian Republic for Vilnius and the Vilnius region regarding "residents of Vilnius and the region, now Lithuanian citizens, taken away by the USSR authorities" has been preserved, dated January 12, 1940. This document reports on residents of the Vilnius region who ended up in the USSR: 533 taken away to the USSR and 139 interned in the USSR.

== Formation of Soviet authorities in Western Byelorussia ==
The system of Soviet authorities was formed gradually in Western Byelorussia. In November–December 1939, the replacement of the Provisional Administrations with committees of the Communist Party of Bolsheviks of Belarus began.

The Soviet system of judicial and prosecutorial bodies was formed late in Western Byelorussia. The following situation arose: for several months, the Polish judicial system did not function, and the Soviet system did not yet exist. Therefore, for example, in the Belostok region in the winter of 1939, there were more crimes that remained unpunished. Even in January 1940, the prosecutor's office in Belostok had not yet begun its work.

In the first months of Soviet power, former members of the Communist Party of Western Byelorussia (disbanded in 1938) were recruited into state and party bodies. In 1938, all former members of foreign communist parties were declared hostile by the Soviet authorities (usually on charges of Trotskyism).

Nevertheless, after the establishment of Soviet power, former members of the Communist Parties of Poland and Western Byelorussia began to apply for admission to the Communist Party of the Soviet Union. Moreover, Jews predominated among the former communists. For example, among the former members of the Communist Parties of Poland and Western Byelorussia who applied for admission to the All-Union Communist Party (Bolsheviks), more than half were Jews.

In early October 1939, the Council of People's Commissars of the Soviet Union ordered that all government posts in the new lands should accept former members of the Communist Party of Western Byelorussia "not indiscriminately, but on an individual basis after a thorough and unhurried check". After this, local communists began to be refused admission to party positions and to the All-Union Communist Party (Bolsheviks). A typical example was the accusation of Trotskyism. For example, on July 27, 1940, the bureau of the Brest regional party committee refused to accept I. Lipshitz as a member of the All-Union Communist Party (Bolsheviks) due to “ideological instability and idealization of the enemy Trotsky”.

== Economy ==
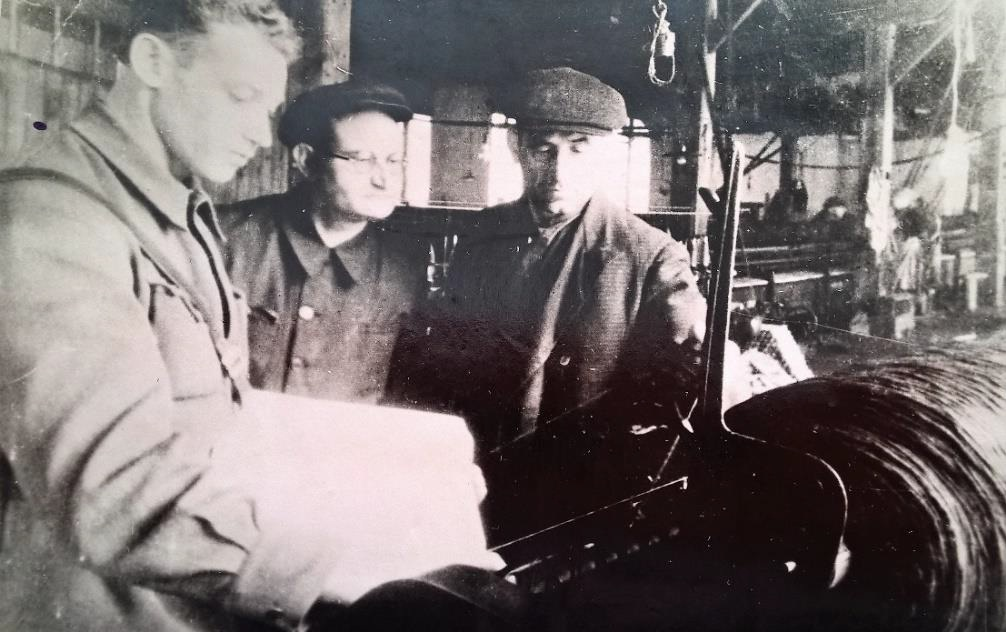
Commission for the acceptance of nationalized equipment from the spinning and weaving factory in Bialystok, 1939

In October 1939 – January 1940, the Soviet government nationalized banks in Western Byelorussia (with confiscation of large deposits), a few industrial enterprises, restaurants, cinemas, and most retail outlets. In addition, in September 1939, trade links with the territory of the former Poland, from where most goods came to Western Byelorussia, were severed. Deliveries from the USSR were small and their plan was chronically not fulfilled. The small traders of Western Byelorussia mostly went bankrupt and were forced to either go into service in the Soviet authorities or engage in speculation. In Western Byelorussia in 1939–1941, a huge “black market” and a total deficit of consumer goods developed, although compared to the eastern regions of the Belarusian SSR, there was an abundance. Excess money was confiscated from the population by allowing them to exchange no more than 300 zlotys (the monthly salary of an accountant-cashier) for Soviet roubles. In the sphere of agriculture, collectivization was not carried out in time, but the peasants (mostly Belarusians) received land - they were given the confiscated lands of the evicted "osadniks" (mostly Poles).

Thanks to the nationalization and expansion of the education system, a large state sector emerged. To maintain discipline, the same punitive measures were taken as in the Soviet Union. Thus, there were cases when teachers in Western Byelorussia were convicted under criminal law for violating labour discipline under the decree of June 26, 1940.

=== Introduction of the Soviet rouble and confiscation of surplus money from the population ===
For the first two months, the Soviet authorities maintained the circulation of the Polish złoty, exchanging it at the rate of 1 Polish złoty to 1 Soviet rouble. This almost corresponded to the official pre-war Soviet exchange rate. According to the foreign exchange rate bulletin published in Pravda on August 1, 1939, 100 Polish złotys were equal to 99.66 Soviet roubles. In fact, the rouble exchange rate was significantly overvalued - before the war, 1 Polish zloty was valued at 3.3 Soviet rubles. Thus, already in the first months, when the circulation of the Polish zloty was allowed, money was confiscated from the local population.

From December 21, 1939, the Soviet authorities banned the circulation of the Polish złoty, and established that each citizen could exchange no more than 300 zlotys for Soviet money. That is, all surplus cash was effectively devalued, since 300 roubles was the monthly salary of an accountant-cashier. Moreover, this measure was announced to the population of Western Byelorussia through newspapers a day before its introduction - on December 20, 1939. For Western Byelorussia, the State Bank of the Soviet Union was allowed to issue 300 million roubles.

Local residents bought up devalued Polish zlotys (at a reduced rate) and took them to German-occupied Poland for resale. For example, a refugee from Radom, Chaim Mintz, was sentenced to 1.5 years in prison with confiscation of all money for buying zlotys from peasants at bazaars and paying 35-90 Soviet roubles for 100 zlotys.

In a number of cases, speculators were assisted by "Easterners", including those who served in Soviet law enforcement agencies. In June 1940, the Zelva District Prosecutor F. M. Shapiro (an "Easterner" from Pukhovichi) organized the sale of manufactured goods belonging to the former tradeswoman Ratner, which had been confiscated from her as evidence, in the building of the People's Court. Some "Easterners" themselves were engaged in speculation.

=== Introduction of the Soviet Tax System ===
Registration certificate of watchmaker V. M. Landau (Slonim district). It has a stamp about the surrender in connection with the departure as a laborer to Saratov (1940)

The new tax system was introduced in two stages. In November 1939 - March 1940, separate tax measures were introduced to reduce the number of people living on "unearned income". In November 1939, taxes on owners of industrial and commercial enterprises and people living on "unearned income" were increased by 50%. At the same time, Soviet representatives often arbitrarily set tax amounts for local traders. Also, in the first months, taxes were introduced at the local level by decision of local authorities. For example, on February 2, 1940, the Belostok Regional Committee of the Communist Party of Byelorussia decided to begin issuing patents for handicrafts (without hiring labour), small trade, and other services (such as shoe repair) for payment of a state fee.

On March 17, 1940, the Politburo of the Central Committee of the All-Union Communist Party extended the laws on taxes and fees in force in the Soviet Union to the population of Western Byelorussia and Western Ukraine.

=== A total shortage of consumer goods and the emergence of a "black market" ===
One of the first consequences of the arrival of the Red Army in Western Byelorussia was a total shortage of goods. Soldiers and officers of the Red Army bought up almost all the goods, and the commanders sent them to Moscow for resale at inflated prices. Red Army soldiers and officers emptied Western Byelorussian stores to a large extent, which resulted in local traders hiding most of the goods in the winter of 1939-1940.

The severance of trade relations with Poland also contributed to the shortage of consumer goods. Until September 1939, goods were delivered to Western Byelorussia from Polish ports, as well as from the central and western regions of Poland. The establishment of German power in Poland led to the fact that this flow of goods ceased. Soviet supplies could not compensate for the Polish ones.

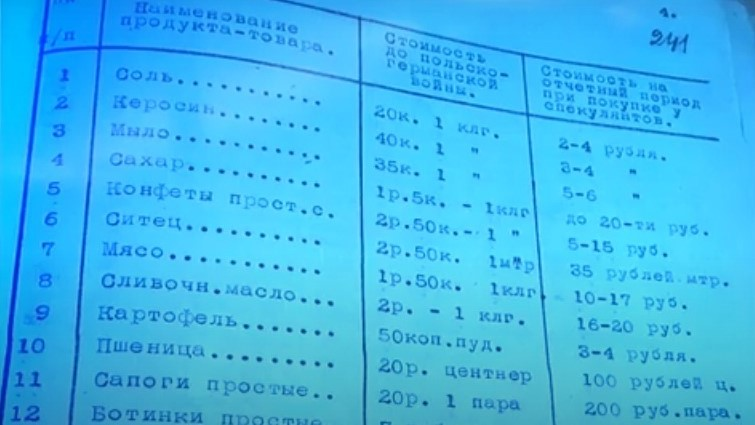
NKVD document on prices in Western Belarus by December 1939 (official and on the black market)

The Soviet authorities unsuccessfully tried to establish supplies to Western Byelorussia. However, in the winter of 1939-1940, the authorities were faced with the fact that trains with goods stood at railway stations for 15–20 days without being unloaded, and the goods sent were bought up by speculators there. Railway workers also stole a lot. On the Belostok railway alone, 342 thefts were solved between January and August 1940.

As a result, plans for deliveries of goods to Western Byelorussia were not fulfilled. For example, in the Belastok Region in the third quarter of 1940, deliveries of hosiery and legwear amounted to 2% of the plan, "clothing" - 4.7%, canned fish - 19%, and no felt footwear was received at all.

== Education ==
The Polish education system inherited by the Soviet authorities was three-tiered:

- School. According to Soviet estimates, in October 1939 there were 7,199 primary schools in Western Byelorussia. Of these, 6,932 were Polish, 3 were Russian, 263 were Jewish, and 1 was German;
- Gymnasium (Lyceum). Education in them was fee-based: in state schools - 200-300 zlotys per year, in private schools - 500-900 zlotys. In addition, there was a qualification for admission to gymnasiums and lyceums for Jews;

University.

- There were no universities in Western Byelorussia before the Soviet regime. The exception was the University of Vilnius, which was transferred to Lithuania in October 1939.

Also in Western Byelorussia, as of October 25, 1939, there were 75 secondary specialized vocational schools.

The Polish system was different in two ways. Firstly, it was Polonized - most schools taught in Polish, university education was only in Polish, and there were no schools in Belarusian or Ukrainian. Secondly, it was only possible to study for free in primary school, which did not give the right to enter a university. Thirdly, the Polish authorities expelled a number of teachers from schools who were not Polish by nationality.

Western Byelorussia was characterized by a high (by Polish standards) level of illiteracy among the population. In the interwar period, it decreased, but still remained significant. For example, according to the last Polish census of 1931, 39% of the residents of the Nowogródek Voivodeship and 50% of the residents of the Polesie Voivodeship were illiterate. These figures were significantly better than those of the 1921 census, according to which 55% of the people in the Nowogródek Voivodeship were illiterate, and 77% of the people in the Polesie Voivodeship were illiterate. However, in Poland as a whole, only 27% were illiterate in 1931. That is, the proportion of illiterates in Western Byelorussia was 1.5 to 2 times higher than the average in Poland.

In the late 1930s, only 77% of school-age children attended school in the eastern voivodeships of Poland, while the average in Poland was 90%. Moreover, the Polish authorities were unable to significantly increase this figure, although the number of students in primary schools was growing steadily. The enrolment rate of children in the eastern voivodeships of Poland in the 1928/29 school year was 77.9% of children aged 7–13, and in the 1937/38 school year it was the same 77.9%. During this period, the number of primary schools in the eastern voivodeships increased from 462 to 842, and the number of students in them increased from 3,572 thousand to 4,877 thousand.

=== Soviet school: from Belarusianization to partial Polonization ===
Since December 1939, the Polish education system was reorganized into a Soviet one: gymnasiums and lyceums were merged with primary schools, creating either incomplete secondary schools or complete secondary schools. Since November 15, 1939, three- and six-month courses for teachers of Western Byelorussia were launched, who were required to teach not in Polish, but in Russian or Belarusian. Universal primary education was introduced. The Soviet school was created with great difficulty. There was a shortage of teachers - universal primary education required an increase in the number of teachers, and many Poles were fired. A feature of Polish primary schools in Western Byelorussia was that most of them were classified as "first level" schools, that is, they had only 1-2 teachers. For example, in the Polesie Voivodeship, 77% of schools were "first level". Therefore, the dismissal of a Polish teacher meant the closure of the school. Belarusian teachers dismissed under the Poles began to appeal to the new authorities with a request to reinstate them in their jobs.

Thus, on October 1, 1939, a resident of the Levkovo farm, Alexander Ivashinko, appealed to the Soviet military commissar of Vileika with a request to allow him to become a teacher in his native village and explained that the Polish authorities did not give him a teaching position because he was “a Russian by origin - a Belarusian and suspected of sympathy for the Soviet government”. Despite the fact that the Soviet authorities did not trust the refugees, they had to accept them as teachers, and even school principals. Many teachers did not know Russian or Belarusian after retraining courses. Moreover, it turned out that the local Belarusian population did not speak the Belarusian literary language. Difficulties in communication between teachers and students arose. Many "Easterners" - teachers who did not know the Polish language spoken by the students were sent to the region. And the Polish students did not know Russian or Belarusian. As a result, the use of Polish in schools continued with the knowledge of local authorities. The new schools also lacked textbooks (especially history, geography, Russian and Belarusian grammar), premises, and maps. Confiscated landowners' and settlers' houses, as well as religious buildings, were allocated for new schools in Western Byelorussia. But still, many schools taught in three shifts in overcrowded classes. Jewish schools (they were non-state under Polish rule) were faced with a choice of the language of instruction: Yiddish or Russian.

=== Higher education ===
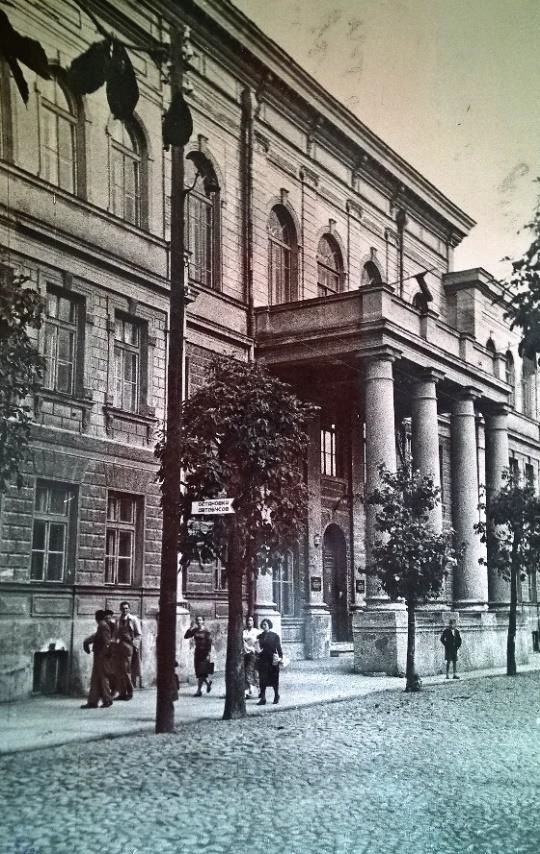
Pedagogical Institute (former Lyceum) in Bialystok, 1940

The transfer of the Vilnius region to Lithuania in October 1939 resulted in the fact that there was not a single university left in Western Byelorussia. Therefore, the Soviet government began to create universities in the cities of Western Byelorussia.

On January 1, 1940, a pedagogical higher educational institution was opened in Białystok, Pinsk, Grodno and Baranovichi. Moreover, in Białystok there was a four-year pedagogical institute that trained teachers for secondary specialized educational institutions, and in Pinsk, Grodno and Baranovichi there were two-year teacher training institutes that trained teachers for schools.

There were relatively few Poles among the students of the new Western Belarusian higher education institutions- lower than their share in the population of the cities of the region. However, a great many Belarusians and Jews entered the universities. For example, in Białystok, where Poles predominated, among the 269 students accepted to the first year, 44% were Jews, 25% Belarusians, 16% Poles, and 14% Russians.

The teaching staff of Western Belarusian universities was partly recruited locally. There were prominent scientists among the university teachers. For example, the famous mathematician Adolf Lindenbaum taught at the Białystok State Pedagogical Institute.

Graduates of Western Byelorussia schools were given the right to study at universities in the Soviet Union. They mainly chose universities in Minsk and Lvov. For example, S. Oshman from Novogrudok entered the Smolensk Medical Institute in 1940, and E. Goldberg from Białystok was enrolled in the same year (although she essentially failed the literature exam) in the literature department of the Institute of Philosophy, Literature, and History in Moscow. Among the young people from Western Byelorussia who entered Soviet universities, there were many Jews. The Soviet authorities encouraged the enrollment of Western Byelorussia residents in Soviet universities. Thus, when the Jewish woman Esther Goldberg was not accepted into the Institute of Philosophy, Literature, and History, the chairman of the All-Union Committee for Higher Education under the Council of People's Commissars of the Soviet Union, Sergei Kaftanov, went out with Esther and addressed the parents of the applicants with a speech in which he stated that the Goldberg case "really smacks of pre-revolutionary anti-Semitism, which no one will put up with." In the end, Goldberg, who was initially denied admission, was nevertheless accepted to the institute.

There were several obstacles for young people in Western Byelorussia to enter universities in the USSR. The first was the mandatory entrance exam in Russian.

== Culture ==
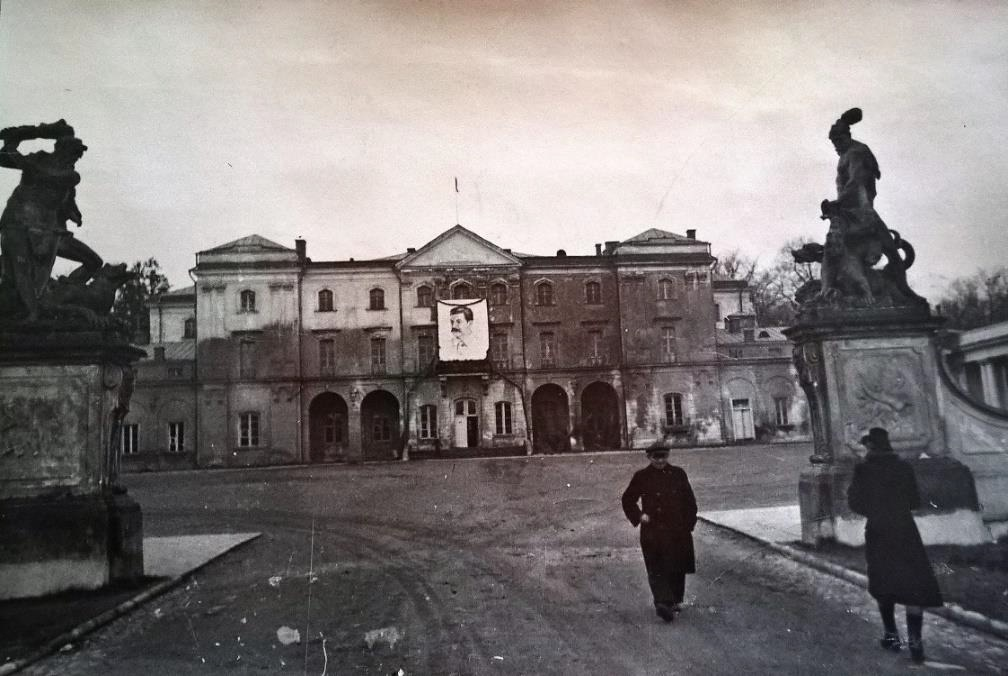
Portrait of Stalin on the Branicki Palace in Białystok

Upon entering the territory of Western Byelorussia, the Red Army soldiers were provided with newspapers and propaganda literature (for distribution to adults) and sweets (for treating children). The Red Army soldiers were strikingly different from the local residents (in clothing, language, behavior), but many positive reviews about the arrival of Soviet soldiers have been preserved.

A number of Soviet cultural figures from among the "Easterners" were sent to Western Byelorussia. They selected local personnel (writers, musicians, singers, etc.), provided them with work in cultural institutions (both nationalized and newly created), and provided them with benefits. Cultural workers from among the local personnel received passports with no restrictions on residence, even if they were refugees. In return, local cultural figures were involved in propaganda work, for example, staging plays in the style of socialist realism. The Soviet government also attracted Belarusian cultural figures who had been repressed under the Polish government. Thus, the poet Maxim Tank became a correspondent for Vileika Pravda and was accepted into the Union of Writers of the USSR.

=== Soviet press in Western Byelorussia ===
At the time of the introduction of troops into Western Byelorussia, Soviet propagandists had little idea of this region. Even the political administration of the Belarusian Military District did not have publications from the General Staff of the Polish Army. The Red Army did not have enough materials about Poland and the life of its population. Lev Mekhlis set up a system for studying Polish propaganda for military councils and political administrations of the fronts only after the start of the war. The German attack on Poland forced the Soviet authorities to create departments for work among the population in the Political Directorate of the Belorussian Front and to increase the circulation of the newspaper of the Belorussian Special Military District by 60% (from 80 thousand to 130 thousand copies). The Red Army did not have enough propaganda literature, leaflets, or even portraits of Soviet leaders to distribute to the local population. Therefore, the system of printed propaganda in Western Byelorussia had to be launched in September 1939, that is, immediately before and during the introduction of Soviet troops.

Soviet newspapers intended for the Western Byelorussian population were created shortly after Germany's attack on Poland. By order of the People's Commissar of Defense of the Soviet Union dated September 9, 1939, the political administration of the Belorussian Front was obliged to publish front-line newspapers in the "printing train": "Krasnoarmeyskaya Pravda" (in Russian, circulation of 100 thousand copies), "Belorussian Star" (in Belarusian, circulation of 30 thousand copies) and "Golos Soldate" (in Polish, circulation of 15 thousand copies). In reality, publication began later. Thus, the first issue of "Krasnoarmeyskaya Pravda" was published only on September 16, 1939.

Many newspapers were printed in the units of the Byelorussian Front: 48 divisional and brigade, 8 army, 3 front-line, thousands of combat leaflets. In addition, during the campaign, the printing houses of the Byelorussian Front published 13 leaflets and brochures for residents of Western Byelorussia with a circulation of 6,610 thousand copies. Army newspapers in September 1939 were more prompt than central newspapers, which were 4–5 days late.

After the occupation of Western Belarusian territory (but before its official incorporation into the USSR), stationary editorial offices of Soviet newspapers began to be created in its populated areas. As early as September 25, 1939, 30 editorial offices of Soviet newspapers were opened in Western Byelorussia. Newspapers were printed locally and also sent from the USSR. Due to a shortage of paper to publish newspapers for Western Byelorussia, the Soviet authorities reduced the circulation, volume, and frequency of periodicals in the eastern regions of the Belarusian SSR (and in some cases completely liquidated them). This reduction resulted in savings of 226.8 tons of paper.

=== Cinema ===
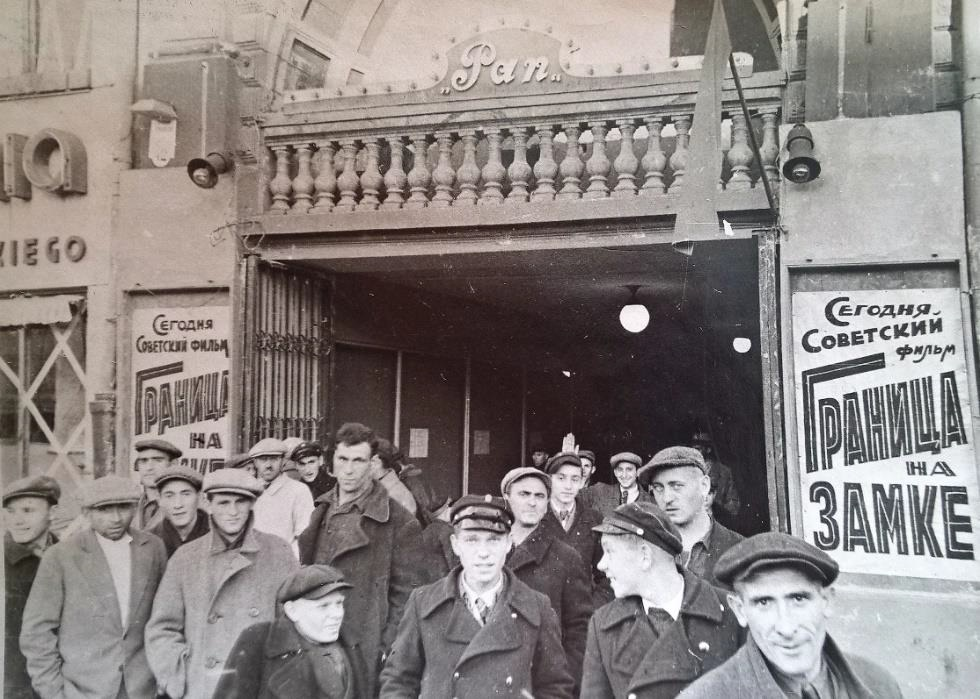
Spectators at the Pan cinema in Grodno, 1939. The screening of the Soviet film The Border on the Trap is announced

In the cities of Western Byelorussia, before the establishment of Soviet power, there was a well-developed network of cinemas. For example, in Grodno there were 4 cinemas. They mainly showed Polish and Hollywood films. The situation was different in rural areas - many peasants had not seen films at all before the arrival of Soviet power.

Soviet filmmakers arrived in Western Byelorussia together with the Red Army - in September 1939. They were filmmakers from Moscow and Minsk. Their goal was to shoot documentary footage for propaganda about how the liberation of Western Byelorussia was taking place. The most successful were the Minsk filmmakers. As early as September 29, 1939, the newspaper "Soviet Belarus" reported on the release of "News of the Day" - a special issue of newsreel from Western Byelorussia shot by Minsk filmmakers.

In the autumn of 1939, propaganda vehicles began arriving in Western Byelorussia to show Soviet propaganda films. Moreover, if the propaganda vehicle traveled through Jewish settlements, the head of the propaganda team was a Soviet Jew (often holding a high position), who showed that Jews occupied a high position in the Soviet Union. The propaganda vehicles were replaced by mobile cinemas, which only showed Soviet films and did not conduct any propaganda. Moreover, trips to rural areas were also carried out in winter, on sleighs.

=== Renaming of Polish names of city streets ===
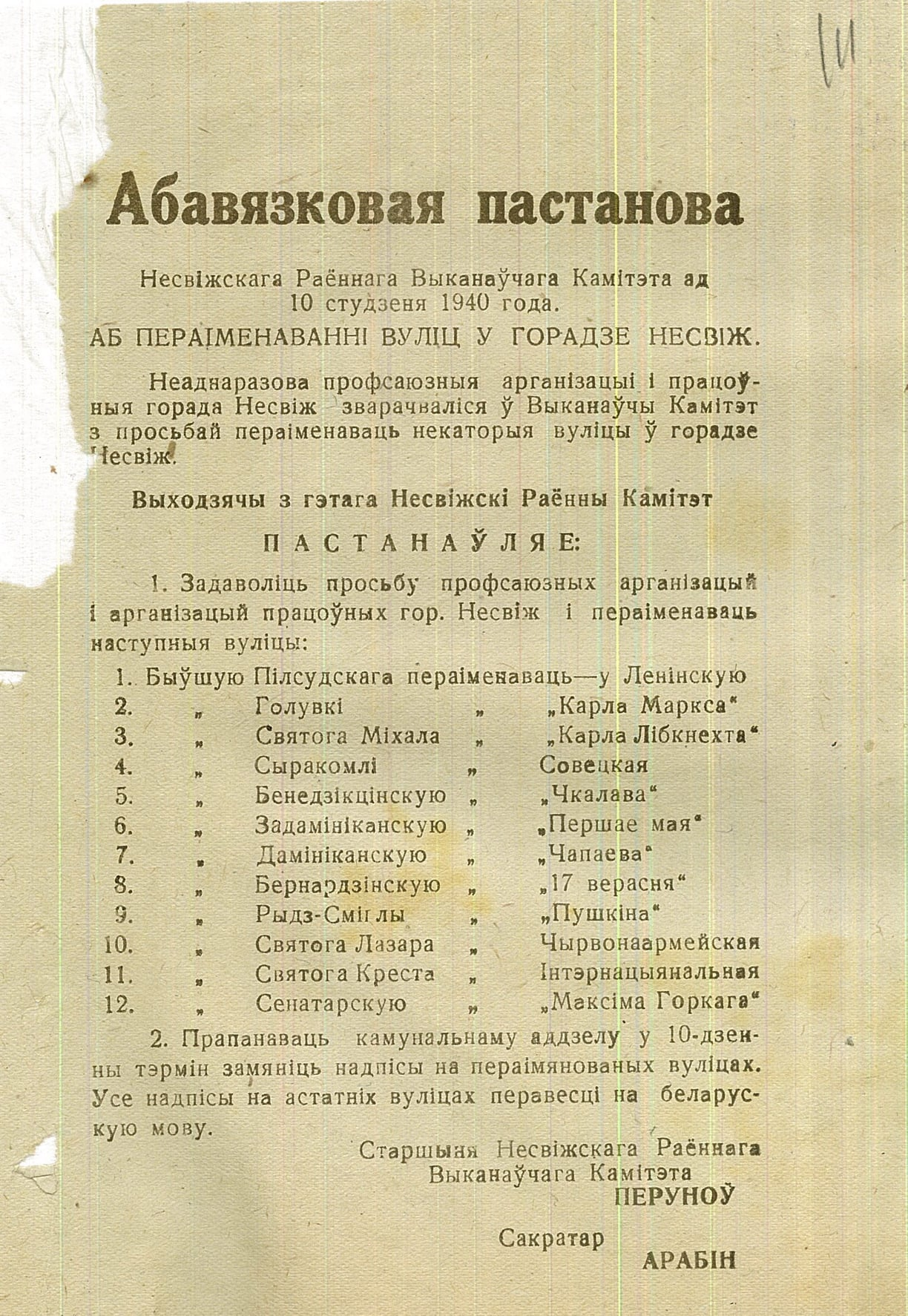
The decision of the authorities of Nesvizh (1940) to rename streets

The names of streets in Western Belarusian cities were partially renamed. On January 8, 1940, the Białystok City Executive Committee adopted a resolution "On renaming streets in order to remove from them the names of those who oppressed the peoples of Western Byelorussia". The following were renamed:

Dombrovsky - Chapayevskaya; Hartserskaya - Sportivnaya; Kupetskaya - Proletarskaya; Shlyakhetskaya - Kolkhoznaya; Yerozolimskaya - Krasnozvezdnaya; Zhidovskaya - Internatsionalnaya. In other cities of Western Byelorussia, the renaming of streets occurred later than in Białystok. In June 1941, the renaming of streets in many settlements of Western Byelorussia was not yet complete.

=== Soviet holidays ===
Instead of religious and Polish public holidays, the Soviet government introduced its own. The holidays were celebrated en masse. Each holiday was held in three stages: preparation, the official part, and unofficial public festivities. For the holidays in Western Byelorussia (as in the USSR), they tried to open some new facilities (for example, hospitals and schools). Mass propaganda events were held before the holidays.

September 17, 1940, the day of the region's liberation from the "lordly yoke", became specific to Western Byelorussia. On this day, a monument to the "Liberation of Western Byelorussia by the Red Army" was ceremonially laid in Białystok.

== Activities of the Red Army units stationed in Western Byelorussia ==
Numerous Red Army units were left in Western Byelorussia after its annexation to the Soviet Union. The total number of military personnel in Western Byelorussia (in units of the Belarusian Front) in September 1939 ranged from 200,802 to 378,610 soldiers and commanders. In early 1940, some units were transferred from Western Byelorussia to the war with Finland. Then the number of troops stationed in Western Byelorussia increased. In the summer of 1940, two armies were stationed in Western Byelorussia: the 10th (Białystok) and the 4th (Kobrin). The military personnel were actively used as agitators in the elections to the Supreme Soviets of the SSR and the Byelorussian SSR (March 24, 1940) and local councils of people's deputies (December 15, 1940) held in Western Byelorussia. At the same time, the military personnel stationed in Western Byelorussia did not have the right to vote in these elections. However, the military personnel had the right to be elected to local government bodies. Thus, in the elections to the Baranovichi city council in December 1940, 5 out of 98 seats were won by military personnel.

The Red Army soldiers had a great influence on the formation of party bodies, which had (unlike the councils of people's deputies) real power. The proportion of military personnel at party conferences was very high. Thus, there were 135 military delegates (38% of the total number of delegates) at the Belostok party conference. 80 military delegates (29.2% of their total number) took part in the Pinsk conference, and 61 military delegates (24.2% of their total number) took part in the Vileika conference. In addition, demobilized Red Army soldiers were used in leadership positions.

When occupying villages, political instructors, with the help of military personnel, created peasant committees there, which were supposed to divide the landowners' land and livestock (with a warning "not to slaughter"), create a militia, and organize the work of schools and medical centers.

At first, the Red Army received certain judicial functions in relation to Polish prisoners of war in the territory of Western Byelorussia. The overwhelming majority of soldiers of the Polish army from among the natives of Western Byelorussia were released by order of Beria on October 3, 1939. However, on the same day, October 3, 1939, the Politburo of the Central Committee of the All-Union Communist Party (Bolsheviks) adopted a resolution “On the procedure for approving sentences of military tribunals in Western Ukraine and Western Byelorussia”, which granted the military councils of the Belarusian and Ukrainian fronts the right to approve sentences of tribunals to execute “for counterrevolutionary crimes of civilians in Western Ukraine and Western Byelorussia and servicemen of the former Polish army”.

The creation of a Soviet-German border where there had never been one led to the need for the forced resettlement of local residents. By May 1, 1940, it was ordered to evict the local population from the 800-meter border strip.

Since 1940, residents of Western Byelorussia were subject to conscription into the Red Army, the number of which had increased significantly during that period. From August 1 to September 5, 1940, residents of Western Byelorussia born between 1917 and 1921 were registered for military service. It was decided to enroll persons born in 1920–1921 who knew Russian and were fit for service in the Red Army. In September–October 1940, a draft into the Red Army took place in Western Byelorussia. Quite a few people were willing to serve. Poles and some religious minorities (for example, Baptists) were conscientious objectors.

== Resistance to Sovietization in Western Byelorussia ==
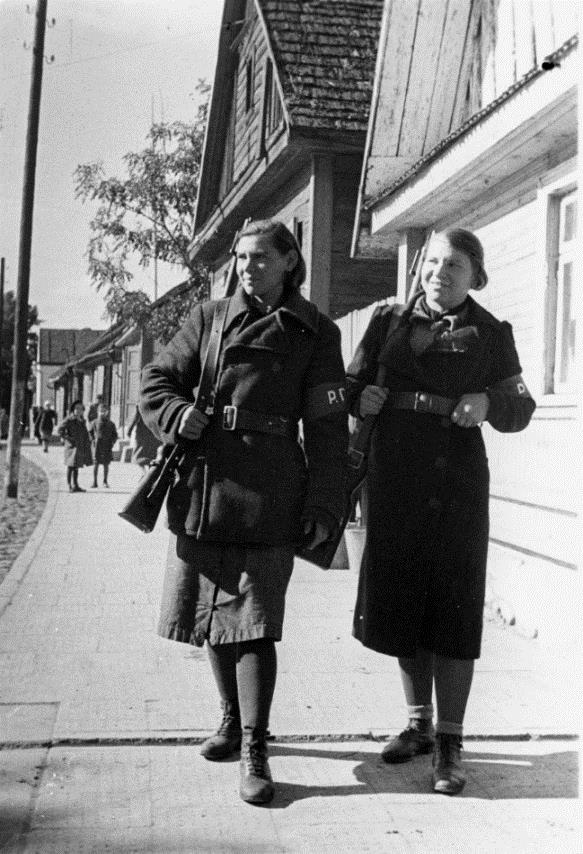
Members of the Volkovysk Workers' Guard Maya Aen and Lyuba Garberman

Polish armed resistance began in Western Byelorussia, as in Western Ukraine. The Polish government in exile, citing the IV Hague Convention, refused to recognize the decision of the People's Assembly of Western Byelorussia of November 2, 1939, to annex Western Byelorussia to the USSR. By December 1939, the Union of Armed Struggle was created, which had a branch in Western Byelorussia, in Białystok. The Polish government in exile gave orders to the Białystok District to conduct armed struggle (acts of terror, destruction of fuel depots, sabotage of transport and communication lines), to disorganize the work of Soviet bodies, in an attempt to achieve a "weakening of the Soviet regime" in this way. It was also ordered to prevent the mobilization of local youth into the Red Army and to facilitate their departure to Romania and Hungary. Money, gold and radio transmitters were imported into Poland for these purposes.

Members of Polish organizations committed 93 terrorist acts in Western Byelorussia from October 1939 to August 1940, resulting in the death of 54 people and the wounding of 39 people. As of July 27, 1940, the NKVD had identified 3,231 participants in exposed insurgent organizations. Among them, Poles were overwhelmingly predominant (2,904 people), while Belarusians accounted for only 184 people.

The Belastok Region was most affected by the Polish movement, with 1,190 participants. This ethnic composition was related to the instructions of the Polish Union of Armed Struggle, which prohibited the recruitment of "students, minors, Russians, Jews and alcoholics" into armed formations. Polish partisan detachments were created, which were initially joined by servicemen of the Polish army, defeated in September 1939, and then by residents of Western Byelorussia, fleeing mobilization into the Red Army. In Western Byelorussia, the largest partisan detachments were concentrated in the Belostok and Baranovichi regions.

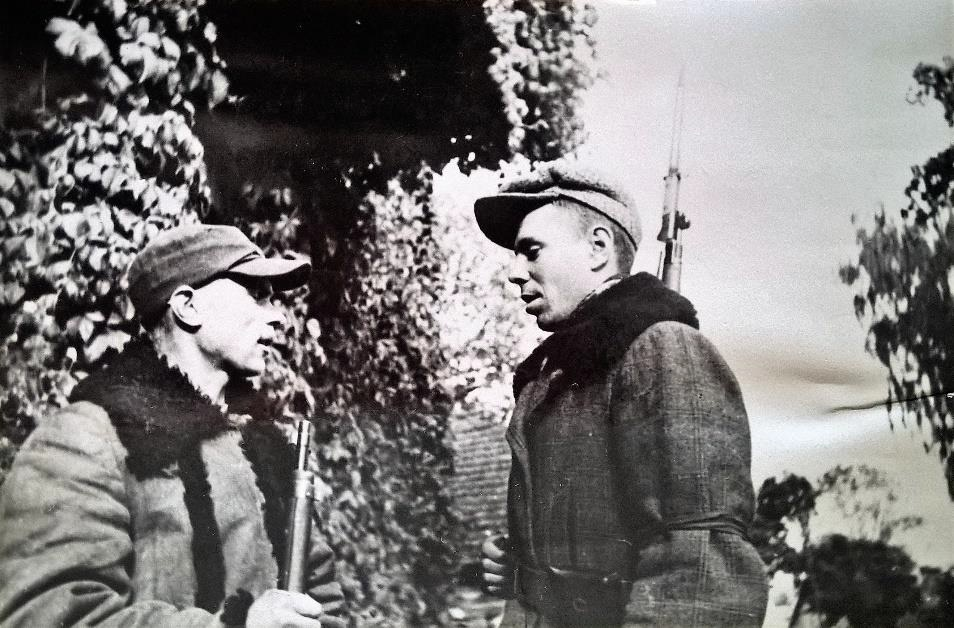
People's militia fighters in Molodechno, 1939

After the defeat of France, the Union of Armed Struggle decided to refrain from armed uprisings on former Polish lands. Moreover, in mid-1940, most of the Polish partisan units were defeated by the NKVD (the partisan headquarters were particularly severely defeated on June 23, 1940, in the Kobelno tract and on July 10 of the same year in Chervonoe Bolot). To combat the Polish underground, anti-banditry departments were created in May 1940 at the NKVD Directorates for the Belostok and Baranovichi regions.

As a result, by the beginning of the Great Patriotic War, an armed anti-Soviet underground existed in Western Byelorussia, but (compared to Western Ukraine) there were few cases of murders of Soviet activists. According to a review by the 6th Department of the 3rd Directorate of the NKGB of the USSR, in May 1941, as a result of terrorist acts throughout the territory of the Byelorussian SSR, 4 people were killed, while in Western Ukraine during the same period, as a result of terrorist acts, 57 people were killed and 27 people were wounded.

== See also ==
- Soviet annexation of Western Belorussia
