= Khazhova =

Agrotown in Minsk Region, Belarus

Khazhova Хажова (Belarusian) Хожово (Russian)
- Agrotown
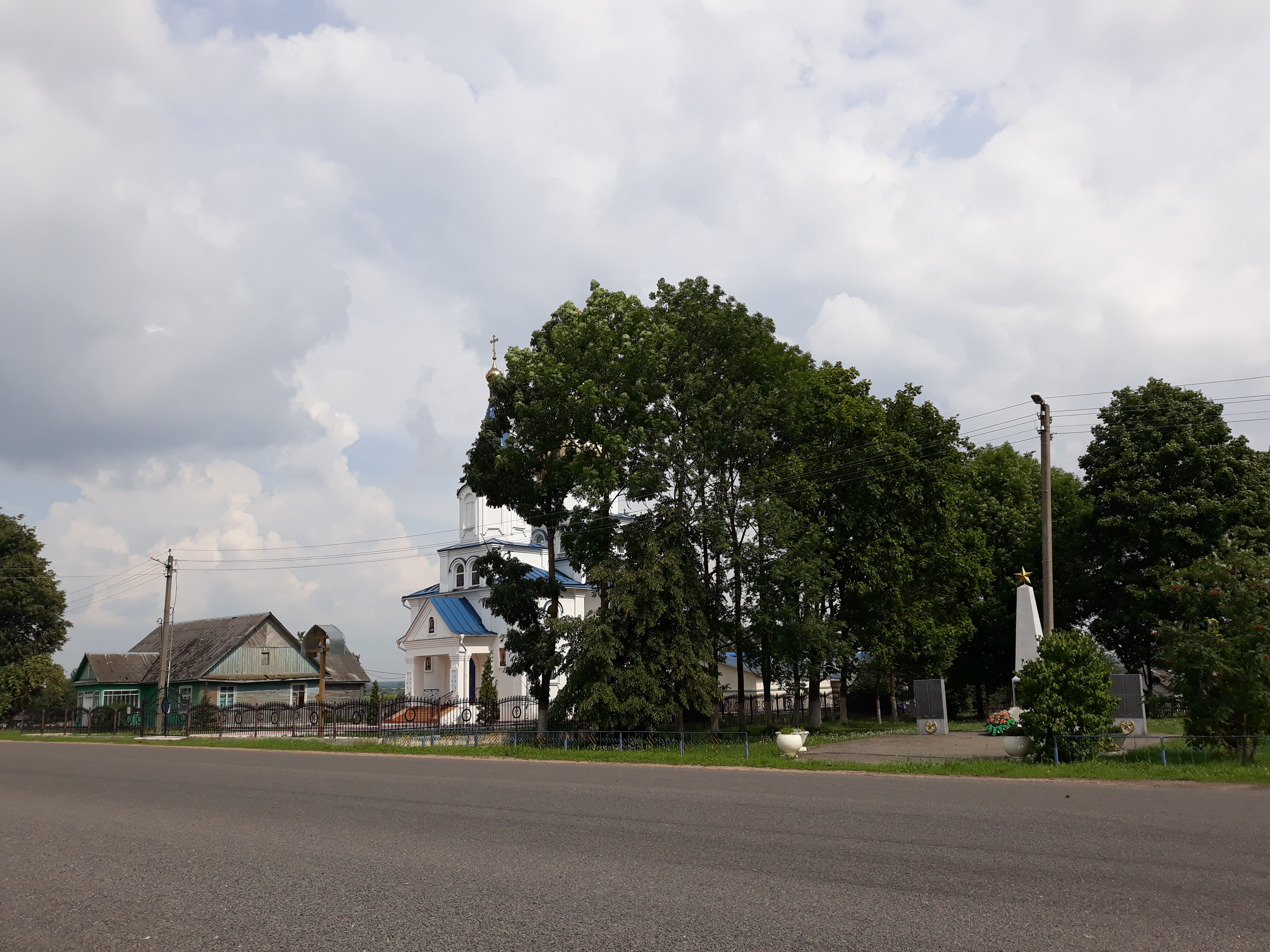

- Location within Belarus
- Coordinates: 54°14′50″N 26°50′07″E
- Country: Belarus
- Region: Minsk Region
- District: Maladzyechna District

Population (2010)
  - Total: 577
- Time zone: UTC+3 (MSK)

Khazhova (Belarusian: Хажова, romanized: Chažova; Russian: Хожово, romanized: Khozhovo) is an agrotown in Maladzyechna District, Minsk Region, Belarus. It serves as the administrative center of Khazhova selsoviet. It is located 10 kilometres (6.2 mi) from Maladzyechna and 88 kilometres (55 mi) from the capital Minsk. In 2002, it had a population of 657. In 2010, it had a population of 577.
