= Palachany rural council =

Subdivision of Maladzyechna, Minsk, Belarus

Palachany rural council is a lower-level subdivision (selsoviet) of Maladzyechna district, Minsk region, Belarus.
