= Krasnaye, Maladzyechna district rural council =

Krasnaye rural council is a lower-level subdivision (selsoviet) of Maladzyechna district, Minsk region, Belarus.
