= Haradzilava rural council =

Haradzilava rural council is a lower-level subdivision (selsoviet) of Maladzyechna district, Minsk region, Belarus.
