= Palachany =

Agrotown in Minsk Region, Belarus

Palachany Палачаны (Belarusian) Полочаны (Russian)
- Agrotown
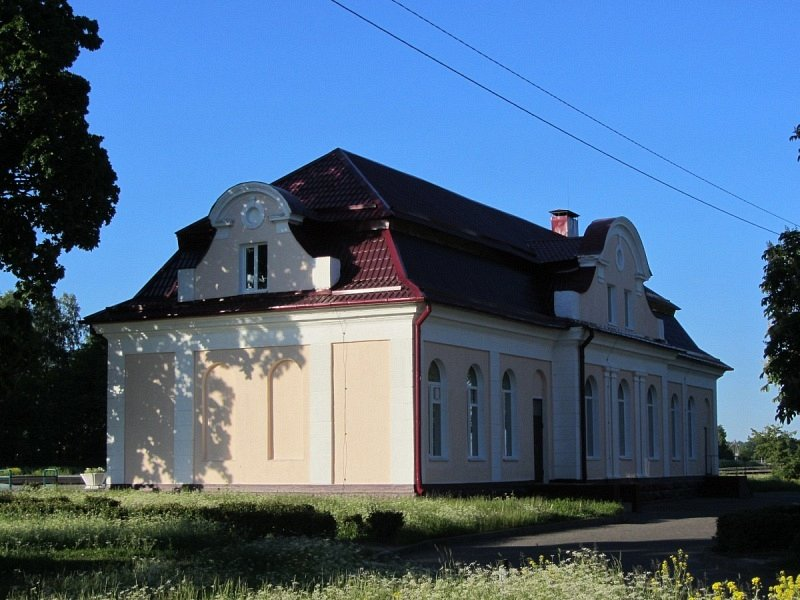

- Location within Belarus
- Coordinates: 54°13′36″N 26°43′15″E
- Country: Belarus
- Region: Minsk Region
- District: Maladzyechna District

Population (2010)
  - Total: 977
- Time zone: UTC+3 (MSK)

Palachany (Belarusian: Палачаны, romanized: Palačany; Russian: Полочаны, romanized: Polochany) is an agrotown in Maladzyechna District, Minsk Region, Belarus. It serves as the administrative center of Palachany selsoviet. It is located 15 kilometres (9.3 mi) from Maladzyechna and 88 kilometres (55 mi) from the capital Minsk. In 2000, it had a population of 1,047. In 2010, it had a population of 977.
