= Vyvyery =

Agrotown in Minsk Region, Belarus

Vyvyery Выверы
- Agrotown
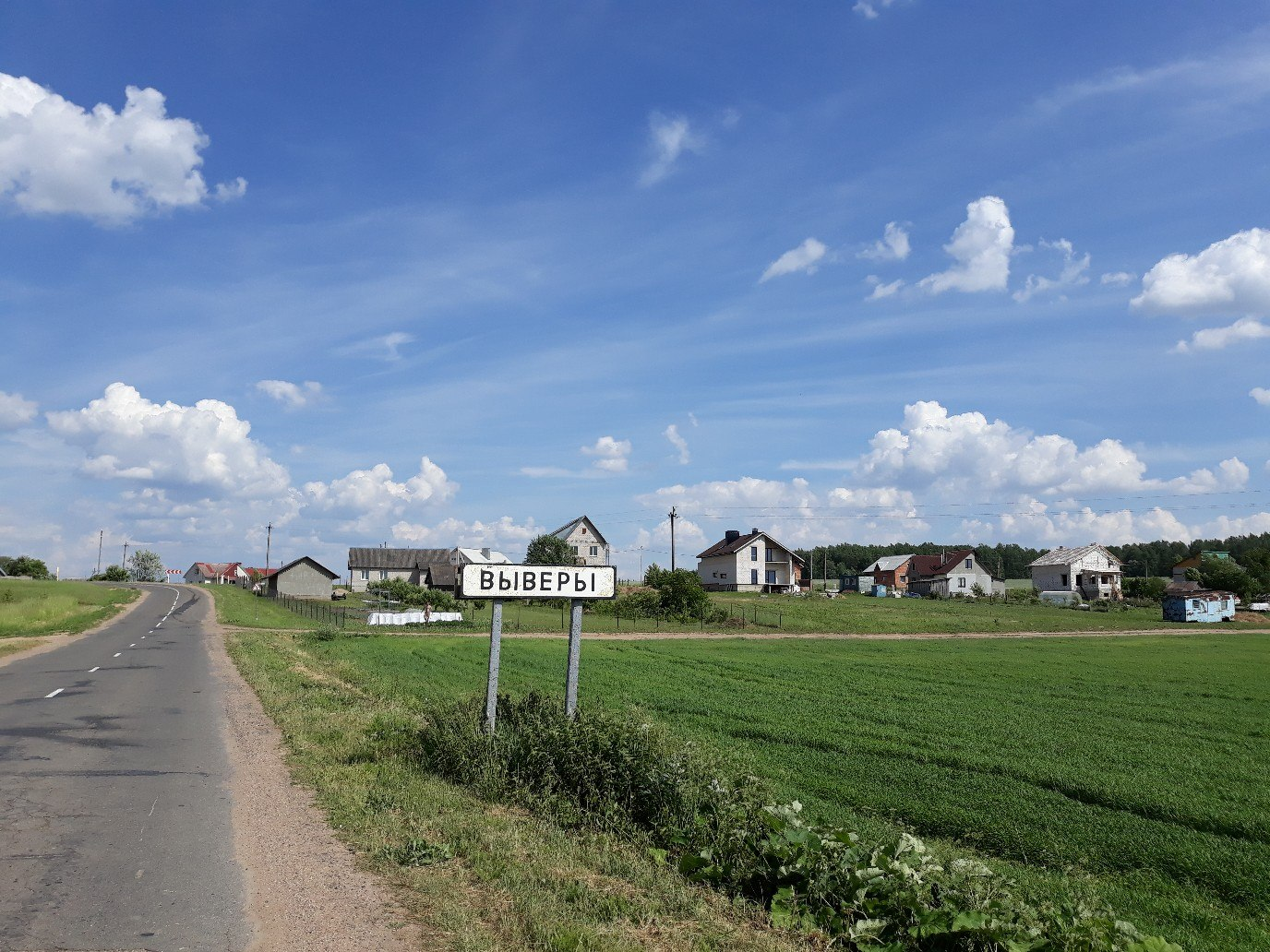

- Location within Belarus
- Coordinates: 54°16′39″N 26°56′51″E
- Country: Belarus
- Region: Minsk Region
- District: Maladzyechna District

Population (2010)
  - Total: 585
- Time zone: UTC+3 (MSK)

Vyvyery (Belarusian: Выверы, romanized: Vyviery; Russian: Выверы, romanized: Vyvery) is an agrotown in Maladzyechna District, Minsk Region, Belarus. It is administratively part of Myasata selsoviet; since 2015, it has served as its administrative center. It is located 15 kilometres (9.3 mi) from Maladzyechna and 63 kilometres (39 mi) from the capital Minsk. In 2010, it had a population of 585.
