= Tsyurli rural council =

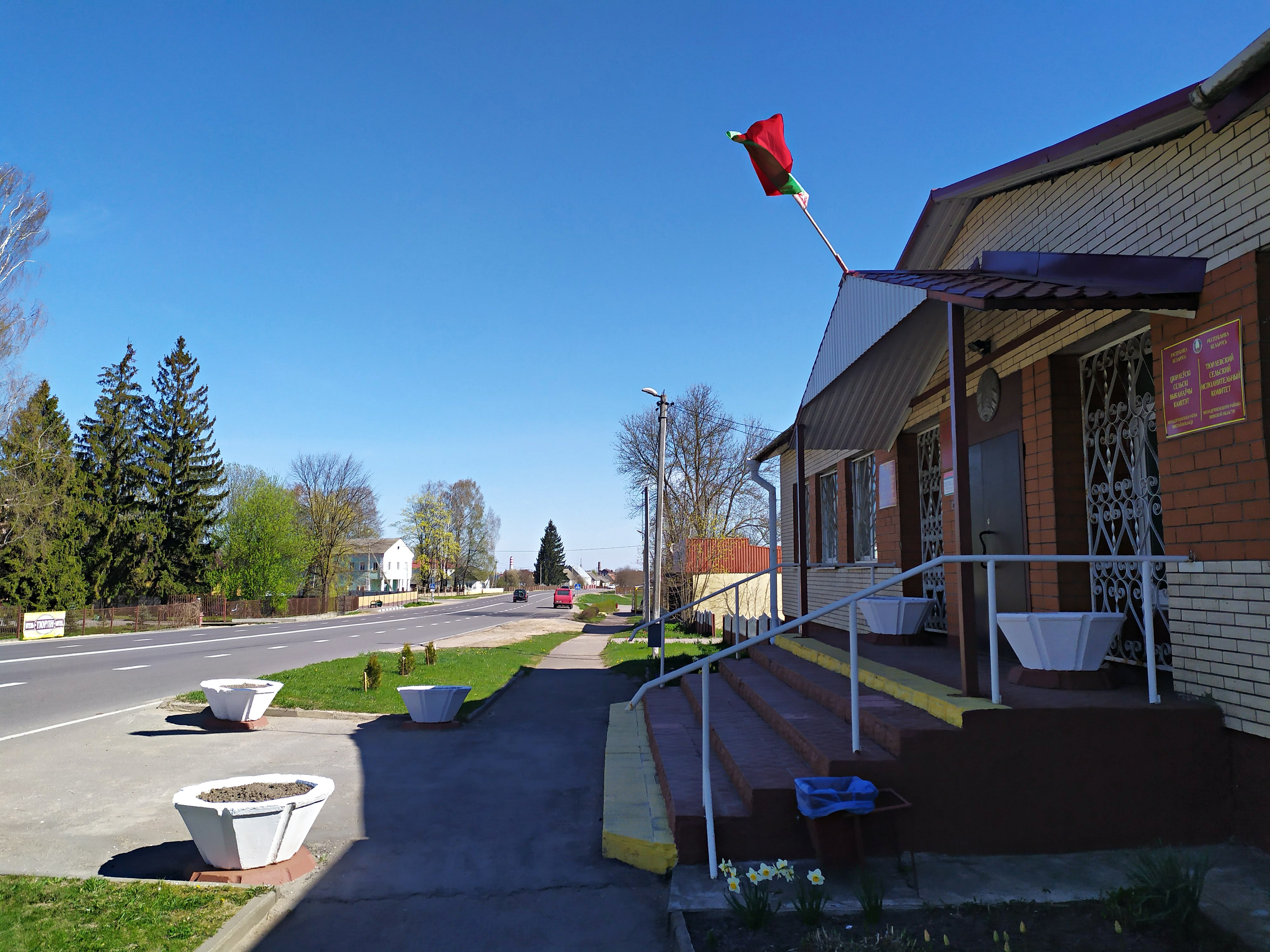
Tyurli, Molodechno District, Minsk Region, Belarus

Tsyurli rural council is a lower-level subdivision (selsoviet) of Maladzyechna district, Minsk region, Belarus.
