= Valentin Tishko =

Belarusian Christian and political activist, poet, and writer

- Валянцін Цішко (Belarusian)
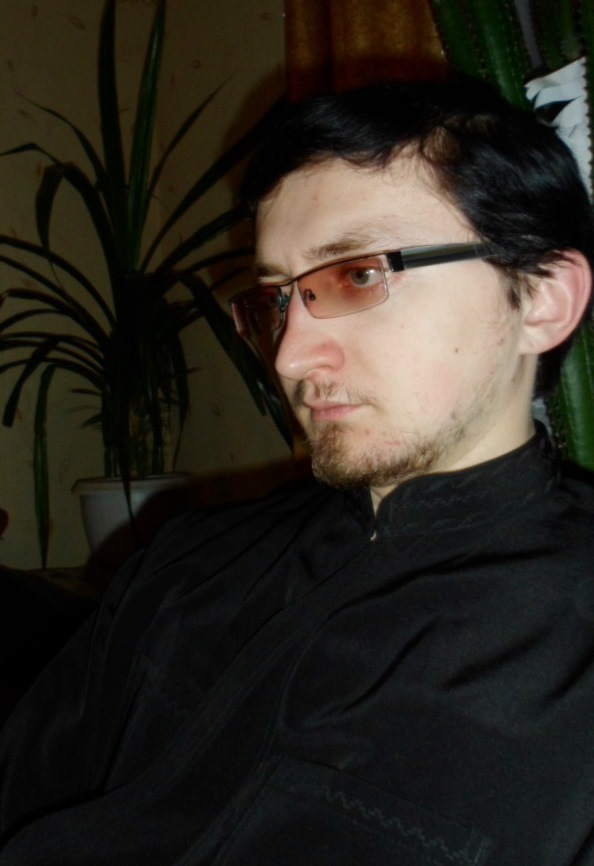
- Born: July 23, 1989 (age 36); Maladzyechna
- Religion: Eastern Orthodoxy
- Church: Autocephalic Greek Orthodox Church of America and Canada

Valentin Tishko

Chairman of the Maladzyechna Branch of BPF Youth
- In office At least 2011 – At least 2011

Personal details
- Born: July 23, 1989 (age 36)
- Party: BPF Youth

Valentin Vladimirovich Tishko (Belarusian: Валянцін Уладзіміравіч Цішко, Russian: Валентин Владимирович Тишко; born 23 July 1989 in Maladzyechna) is a Belarusian Christian and political activist, LGBT rights advocate, poet, and writer. He is a member of the Belarusian Popular Front (BPF), served as chairman of the Maladzyechna branch of BPF Youth in 2011, and has been the coordinator of the Cultural and Educational Project of the Belarusian LGBT Christian Movement "Mysterium Fidei" since January 2013. In August 2013, he was ordained a deacon in the non-canonical Autocephalic Greek Orthodox Church of America and Canada, becoming its only hierodeacon in Belarus. He was subjected to a minor excommunication by the Catholic Church.

== Biography ==
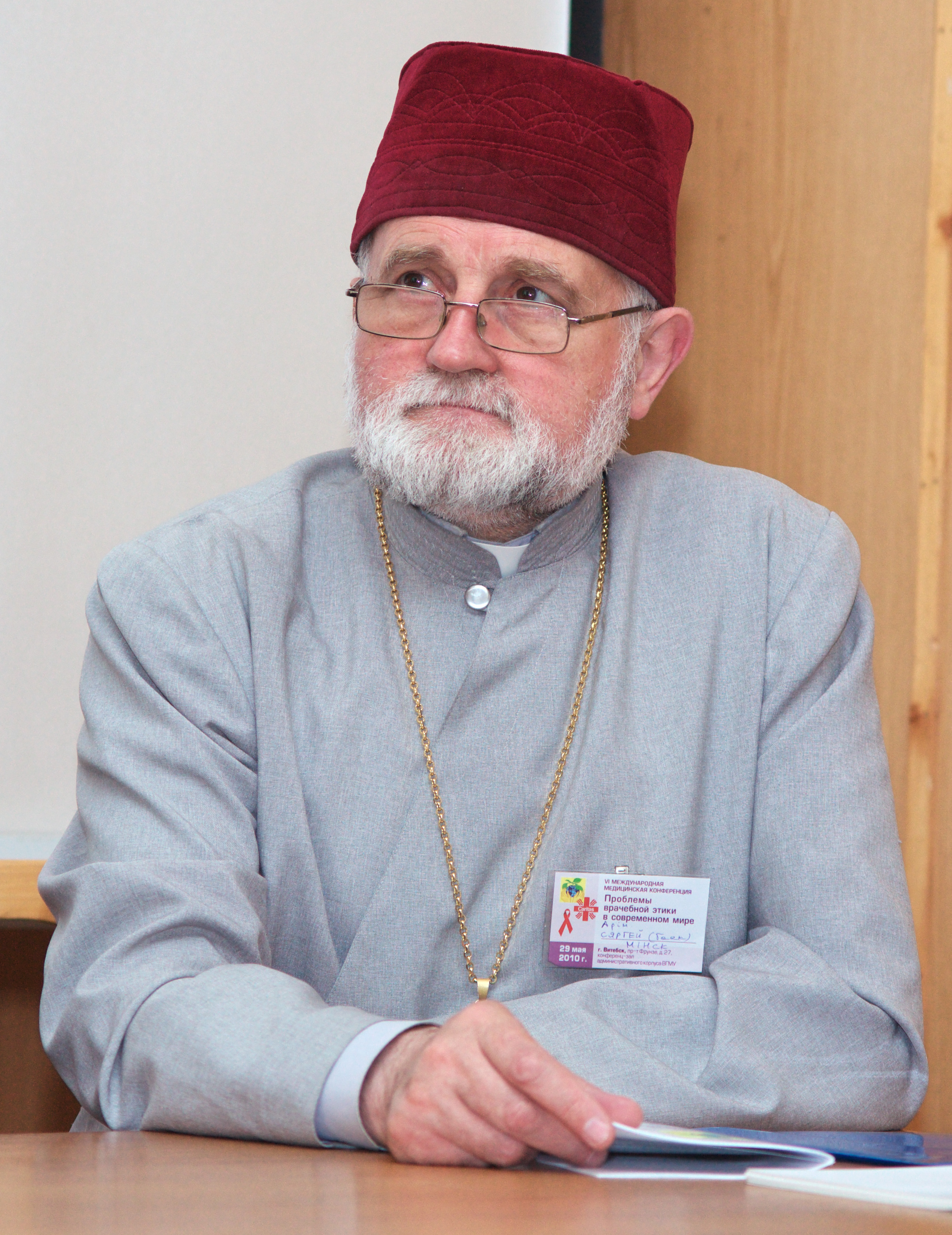
Sergiusz Gajek, who imposed a minor excommunication on Valentin Tishko

Valentin Tishko was born on 23 July 1989 in Maladzyechna, Minsk region, within the Byelorussian Soviet Socialist Republic, Soviet Union. According to him, his grandfather was a staunch communist, while his parents held more neutral ideological views. In 2007, he graduated from Secondary School No. 11. He completed catechetical courses in Belarus before enrolling in a seminary in Ivano-Frankivsk, Ukraine, as a seminarian of the Belarusian Greek Catholic Church. During his studies, he faced accusations of immoral behavior, including homosexuality, leading him to leave the seminary and receive a minor excommunication from Apostolic Visitor Sergiusz Gajek of the Greek Catholic Churches in Belarus. In 2009, he began distance learning to become an accountant at Maladzyechna Commercial and Economic College. He worked as a laborer in a state-owned store, a construction materials seller, and a glazier. He later moved to Minsk. Between 2011 and 2012, he collaborated with the online news portal Zautra Tvajoj Krainy, conducting interviews with Ryhor Baradulin, Vyacheslav Kebich, and Stanislav Shushkevich. He also worked as a correspondent for the online portal kraj.by.

=== Political activity ===
Tishko was a member of the Belarusian Popular Front (BPF) and its youth wing, BPF Youth. In 2010, he expressed his intent to run as a BPF candidate in the local elections for the Maladzyechna District Council, but the party reportedly denied him due to his open homosexuality. During the extraordinary XIII BPF Congress on 29 May 2010 in Minsk, Tishko accused the BPF Youth chairman, Andrei Krechka, and Franak Viačorka of harming and splitting the party, proposing their expulsion, though his motion was not considered. During the 2010 presidential election, he served as the head of the initiative group in Maladzyechna for BPF candidate Ryhor Kastusioŭ, frequently highlighting alleged irregularities and obstructions faced by opposition candidates. In 2011, he chaired the Maladzyechna branch of BPF Youth. While remaining a BPF member, in May 2012, he and Siarhei Androsenka organized a picket outside the party's headquarters to protest homophobic statements by some party leaders. During the campaign for the 2015 presidential election, Tishko joined the initiative group of candidate Tatsyana Karatkyevich, collecting signatures in Maladzyechna.

=== Religious and social activism ===
During a visit to Kyiv for an LGBT community event, Tishko met Volodymyr Wilde, Bishop of Pereiaslav and Bohuslav, Exarch of Ukraine, of the non-canonical Autocephalic Greek Orthodox Church of America and Canada, which is supportive of homosexuals. On 23 January 2013, Tishko became the coordinator of the Cultural and Educational Project of the Belarusian LGBT Christian Movement "Mysterium Fidei", which includes Orthodox, Roman Catholics, and Uniates, aiming to change negative church attitudes toward homosexuality.

In April 2013, Tishko protested against a statement by Grodno priest Kazimir Zhylis, who suggested the Catholic Church should excommunicate gay and lesbian individuals. Since 2011, he repeatedly requested Belarusian authorities to replace mandatory military service with alternative civilian service, as permitted by the Belarusian constitution, but was denied. On 1 July 2013, he announced his renunciation of Belarusian citizenship in protest. In August 2013, during the VI Forum of LGBT Christians of Central Asia and Eastern Europe in Kyiv, he was ordained a deacon by Volodymyr Wilde.

=== Literary work ===
Tishko is a poet and writer, creating works in Belarusian, Russian, and Ukrainian. He wrote his first poem at age 13 and, by 2010, had produced about 50 poems and several short stories. Since 2005, he has collaborated with the poetic association Ahmień. Three of his works, Pierakład B. Achmaduliny, Kałychanka dla Alżbiety, and Adzinokaje pryznannie, were published in 2010 in the poetry collection Ahmień. On 16 May 2015, he won 3rd place in a literary competition at the "Time to Live!" youth creative initiatives festival in Maladzyechna.

=== Views ===
Tishko strongly opposes Belarus' current political system, advocating for the country's independence and greater use of the Belarusian language. He rejects the official version of Belarusian history taught in schools, viewing Belarus as a bargaining chip for the Russian Empire and a buffer state for the Soviet Union. He considers being Belarusian "dangerous" but accepts this with "joy and a sense of duty". His views were shaped by a Belarusian language teacher who introduced him to non-curriculum Belarusian literature and by visits to Ukraine, where the stronger presence of the native language prompted reflection.
