= Myasata rural council =

Myasata rural council is a lower-level subdivision (selsoviet) of Maladzyechna district, Minsk region, Belarus.
