= Radashkovichy rural council =

Radashkovichy rural council is a lower-level subdivision (selsoviet) of Maladzyechna district, Minsk region, Belarus.
