= Lyebyedzyeva, Maladzyechna district rural council =

Lyebyedzyeva rural council is a lower-level subdivision (selsoviet) of Maladzyechna district, Minsk region, Belarus.
