= Alyakhnovichy =

Agrotown in Minsk Region, Belarus

Alyakhnovichy Аляхновічы (Belarusian) Олехновичи (Russian)
- Agrotown
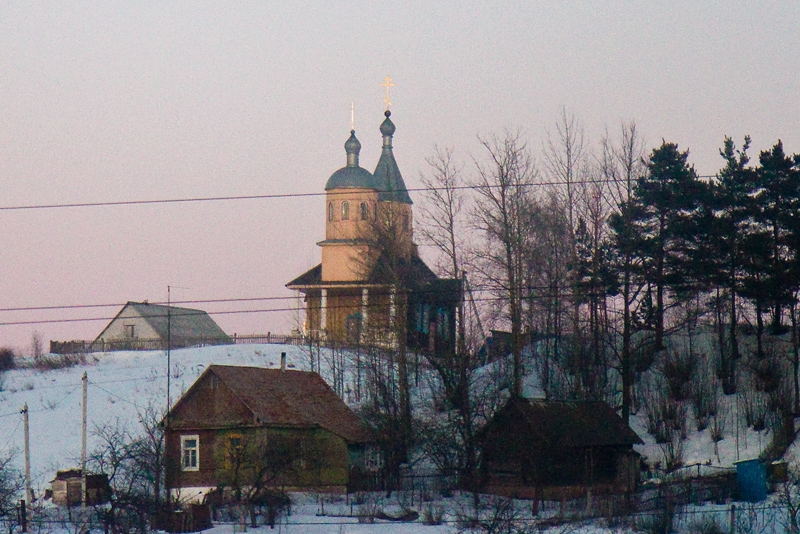

- Location within Belarus
- Coordinates: 54°09′03″N 27°05′50″E
- Country: Belarus
- Region: Minsk Region
- District: Maladzyechna District

Population (2010)
  - Total: 1,709
- Time zone: UTC+3 (MSK)

Alyakhnovichy (Belarusian: Аляхновічы, romanized: Aliachnovičy; Russian: Олехновичи, romanized: Olekhnovichi) is an agrotown in Maladzyechna District, Minsk Region, Belarus. It serves as the administrative center of Alyakhnovichy selsoviet. It is located 19 kilometres (12 mi) from Maladzyechna and 50 kilometres (31 mi) from the capital Minsk. In 1995, it had a population of 1,181. In 2010, it had a population of 1,709.
