= Maladzyechna (air base) =

- IATA: none; ICAO: UMOV

Summary
- Airport type: Public
- Location: Maladzyechna
- Elevation AMSL: 682 ft / 208 m
- Coordinates: 54°14′54″N 026°52′18″E
- Interactive map of Maladzyechna

Runways
Direction	Length		Surface
Direction	ft	m	Surface
	7,874	2,400

Maladzyechna (also Molodechno) was an air base in Belarus located 8 km south of Maladzyechna. It was a 1960s-era fighter base, headquarters of the 330th Fighter Aviation Division, 26th Air Army from 1955-60. Towards the end of the Cold War it was plowed under for farmland. The geometrics remained visible on Google Earth imagery as of 2006, and a small propeller airplane was visible suggesting the airfield has remained as a minor airstrip.
