= BPF Youth =

BPF Youth Моладзь БНФ
- Leader: Dzianis Mandzik
- Founded: 2005
- Ideology: Belarusian nationalism Conservatism; Liberal conservatism

Website
- https://moladz.info/en

The BPF Youth (Belarusian: Моладзь БНФ, translit. Moladź BNF) is the largest youth-led, party political organization in Belarus, the youth wing of the BPF Party.
