= Maladzyechna =

Maladzyechna Маладзечна (Belarusian) Молодечно (Russian) Molodechno
- Town
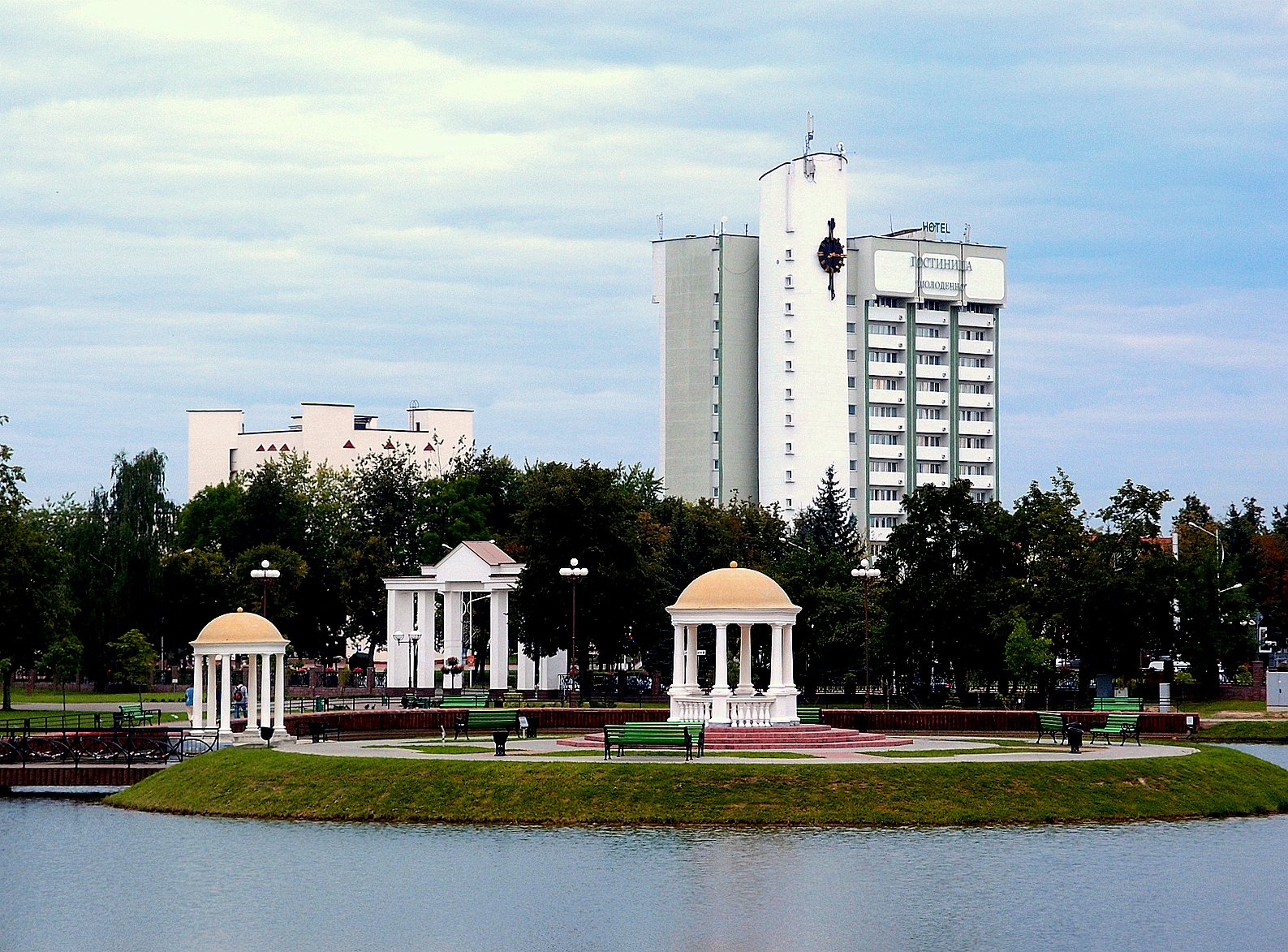
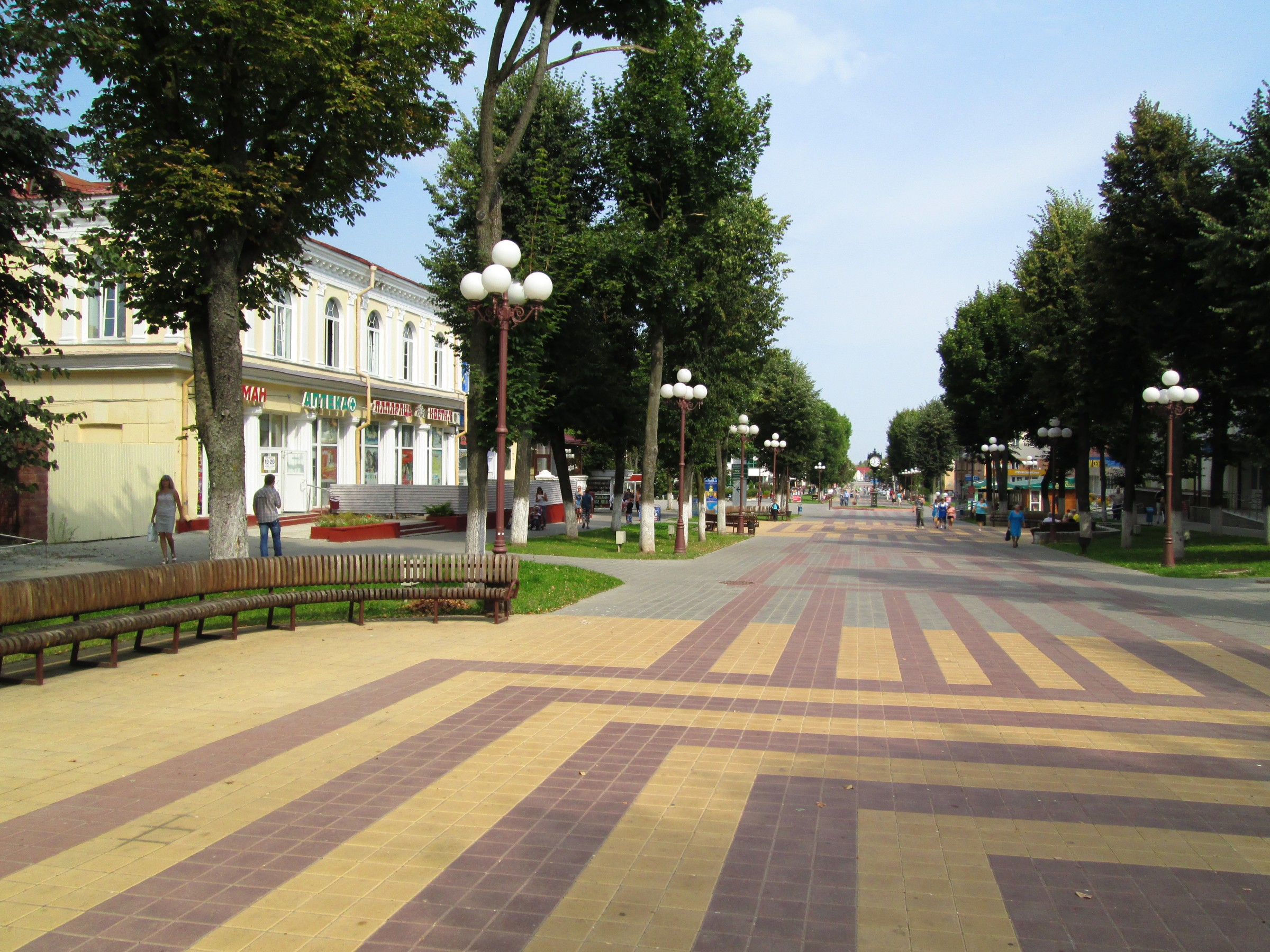
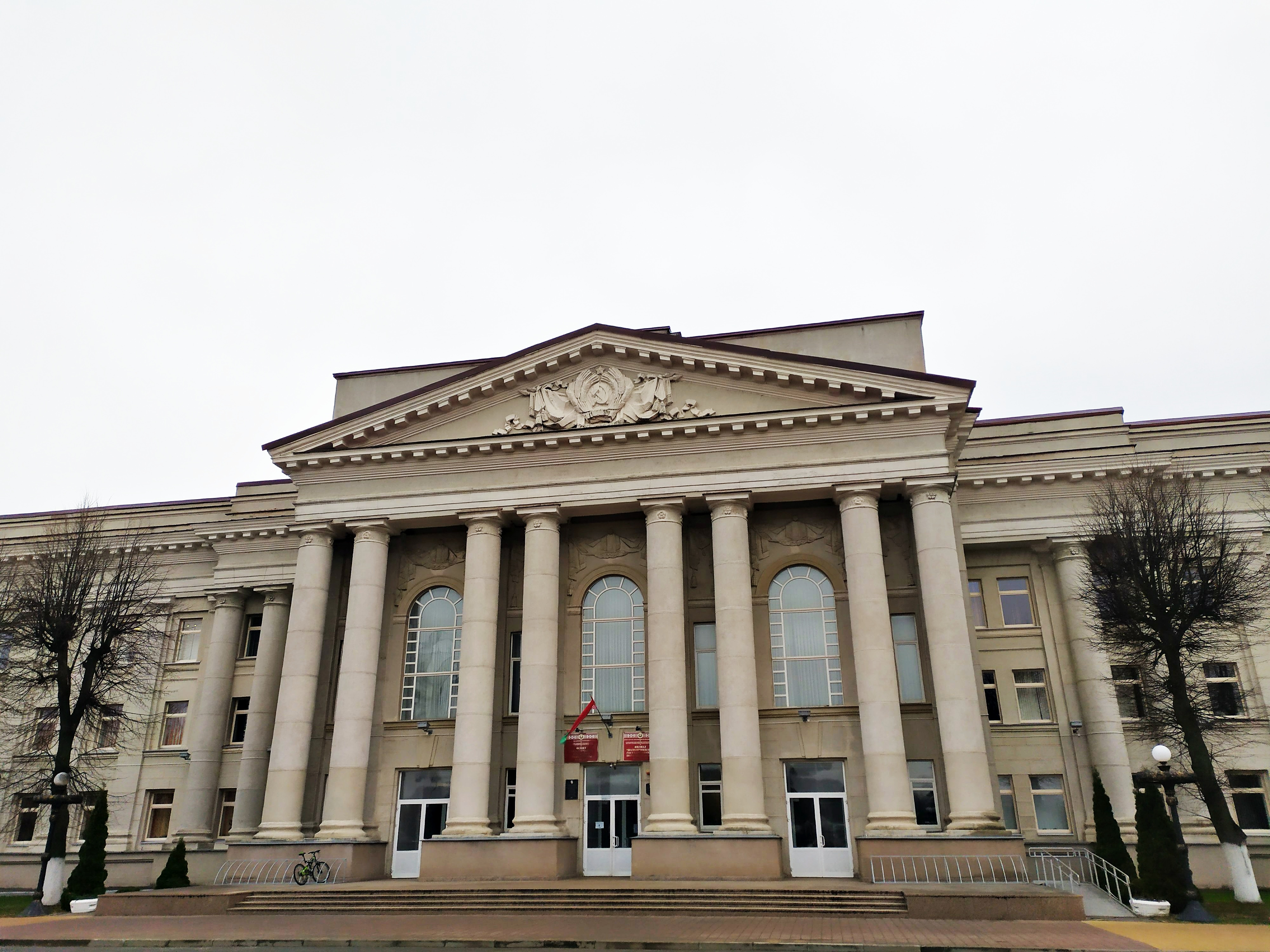
- Park Pieramohi Prytytskaha Street College

- Flag Coat of arms

- Location within Belarus
- Coordinates: 54°19′15″N 26°51′26″E
- Country: Belarus
- Region: Minsk Region
- District: Maladzyechna District
- First mentioned: 16 December 1388

Area
  - Total: 30 km^{2} (12 sq mi)

Population (2026)
  - Total: 87,339
  - Density: 2,900/km^{2} (7,500/sq mi)
- Time zone: UTC+3 (MSK)
- Postal code: 222301-10
- Area code: +375 176
- License plate: 5
- Website: Official site

Maladzyechna (or Molodechno) (Note: Belarusian: Маладзечна, romanized: Maladziechna, IPA: [maɫaˈdzʲetʂna]; Russian: Молоде́чно; Polish: Mołodeczno.) is a town in Minsk Region, Belarus. It serves as the administrative centre of Maladzyechna District (and formerly of Molodechno Region from 1944 to 1960). Maladzyechna is located 72 kilometres (45 mi) northwest of Minsk. As of 2026, it has a population of 87,339.

Located on the Usha River, it has been a settlement since 1388 when it was part of the Grand Duchy of Lithuania. It was also home to the Cold War facility Maladzyechna air base.

== History ==
=== Early history ===
The fortification on the right bank of the Usha River was first mentioned in 1388, although it is probable it was erected even before that date. Rectangular earthworks with stone walls 3,5 metres high and 11 metres wide formed the basis of the future castles and military camps formed on that location. The town itself was first mentioned the following year in a document issued by Kaributas, Prince of Severian Novgorod, who on December 16 assured his tributary fidelity to his cousin, King Władysław II Jagiełło and Jadwiga of Poland.

In 1501, the Maladzyechna was donated by King Sigismund I the Old to certain Michael of Mstsislaw, on the condition that the latter provided a safe river passage for the nobles and hunters dwelling in the area. The privilege was further confirmed on July 12, 1511.

After Michael's heirless death, the locality passed through different hands until finally in 1567 it was acquired by Princess Nastazja Zbaraska, wife of Stafan Zbaraski, the voivode of Trakai. In 1568, that is the following year, a battle took place in the vicinity of the castle, in which the 40,000 men strong army of the Polish–Lithuanian Commonwealth defeated the forces of Muscovy. In 1617 it was bought by Lew Sapieha, the Grand Chancellor of Lithuania. Around that time the village had 1,000 inhabitants. On August 20, 1631, Sapieha sold it to Stanisław Szemiott, the chamberlain of Samogitia, who then divided the villages surrounding Maladziečna among his sons. Following a testament conflict between the descendants of Szemiott and Aleksander Gosiewski, the Voivode of Smolensk, the town remained a property of the Gosiewski family. During their ownership of Maladziečna the fortifications were extended and strengthened significantly by addition of several bastions. Around that time Maladziečna started to be referred to as a town, even though it was officially a village and was not granted with a city charter. Nevertheless, it served as a centre of trade and commerce for the surrounding villages and also gained significant profits from transit between Lithuania and Poland. In 1708 the castle was one of the headquarters of the Swedish Army of King Charles XII of Sweden, which led to its partial devastation in the effect of a battle between the Swedes and the Russian forces.

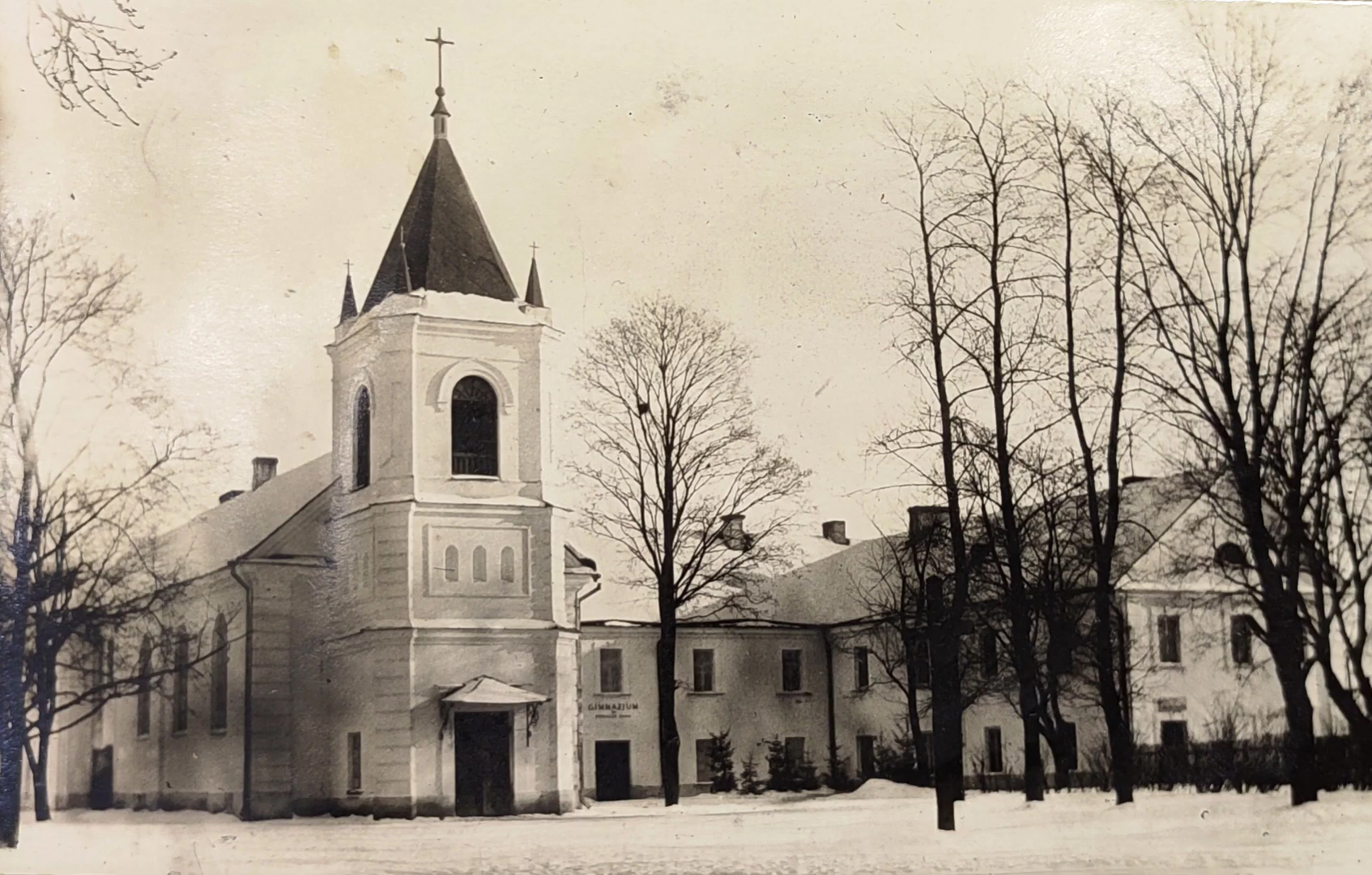
Former Trinitarian church and monastery in 1928

On September 18, 1711, Bishop Bogusław Gosiewski, sold the town to the mighty Ogiński family. Among the owners of the area were Kazimierz Ogiński and Tadeusz Ogiński, the Castellan of Trakai (Lithuania). The Ogiński family became the main benefactors of the area, as they made it one of the main centres of their domain. They erected a new, classicist palace with notable frescoes, as well as a late renaissance church. It was also them to ask the king Sigismund II Augustus to grant the town with a city charter. Although it was not granted, in 1730 the monarch granted the town with the privilege of organization of two fairs a year and 2 markets every week. In mid-18th century the Ogiński's also founded a monastery of the Trinitarians there.

Within the Grand Duchy of Lithuania, Maladziečna was part of Minsk Voivodeship.

=== Late modern period ===
In 1793, Maladziečna was acquired by the Russian Empire as a result of the Second Partition of Poland. The palace was abandoned soon afterwards. The castle was also neglected. During the final stages of Napoleon's invasion of Russia it was there that the Grande Armée made its last stand in former Grand Duchy of Lithuania. In early November 1812 Napoleon Bonaparte gave his last orders to his marshals there, after which he left for Vilnius. On November 21 of that year the Polish-born Russian general Yefim Chaplits arrived at the French camp there and defeated the already-routed French forces led by Marshal Victor. In the effect of the fights the town was completely demolished, as were the monastery and the castle. Because of that, in the mid-19th century the town had no more than 500 inhabitants.

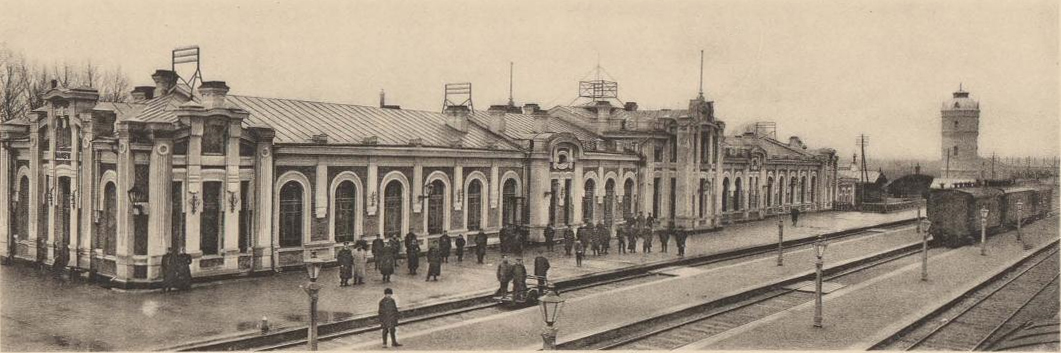
Railway station in 1907

It was not until the later part of the century that the town started to gradually recover. In 1864 a Russian-language school was opened there and in 1871 an Orthodox church of Intercession of Our Most Holy Lady was built at the main town square. In 1873 it was linked to the world by the Minsk–Vilna railway, which sparked a period of economic recovery of the entire region. In the early 20th century an additional rail line was opened, linking Saint Petersburg and Polotsk with Lida and Siedlce. This made the town a major railway junction and attracted many new settlers, in large part Jewish. By the outbreak of World War I the town had already over 2,000 inhabitants.

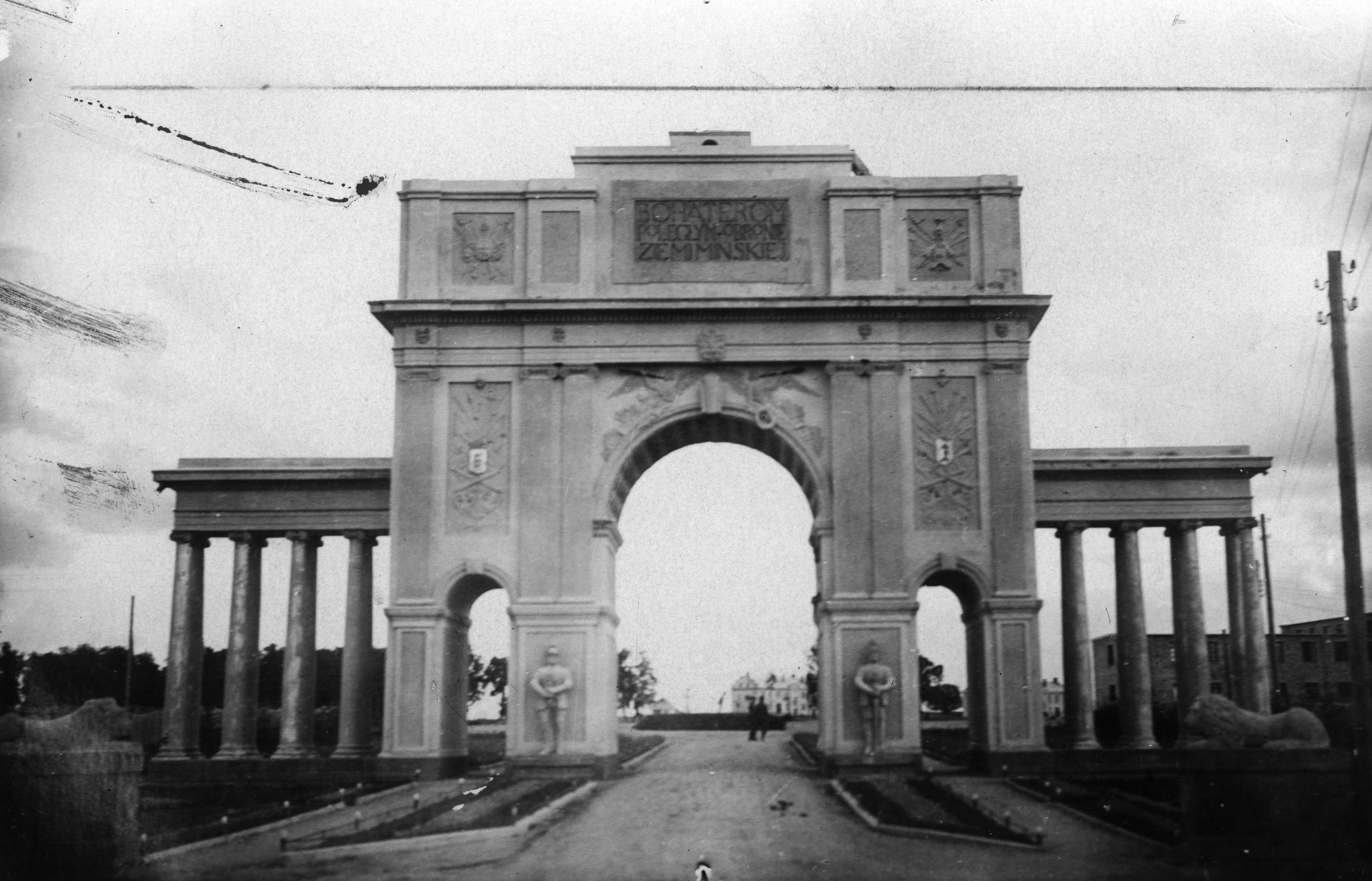
Polish triumphal arch from 1929, demolished in the 1960s

During the war, the town was the headquarters of the Russian 10th Army of the Western Front. Between February and December 1918 it was under German occupation, but was then seized by the Bolshevik forces during the Russian Civil War. On July 4, 1919, the town was captured by Polish Army units led by Gen. Stanisław Szeptycki, during their advance towards Minsk. However, the town was again held by the Russian forces in the course of the Polish–Soviet War between 12 July 1920 and 12 October 1920. Following the Riga Peace Treaty it was transferred to the Second Polish Republic, but the border between Poland and the Soviet Union was only 30 kilometres to the east, which cut Mołodeczno, as the town was known in Polish, from much of its economic hinterland.

It became a garrison town of the Polish Army, with the 86th Infantry Regiment stationed there from 1922. To counter the threat of economic decline, it became a capital of separate powiat (county) within the Wilno Voivodeship on April 1, 1927, and on April 26, 1929, the town was granted with city rights and its city limits were expanded.

=== World War II ===
On 17 September 1939, Maladzyechna was occupied by the Red Army and, on 14 November 1939, incorporated into the Byelorussian SSR. On 4 December 1939, Maladzyechna became a part of the newly formed Vileyka Region of the Byelorussian SSR. The NKVD expropriated the local school for teachers and set up one of its concentration camps there.

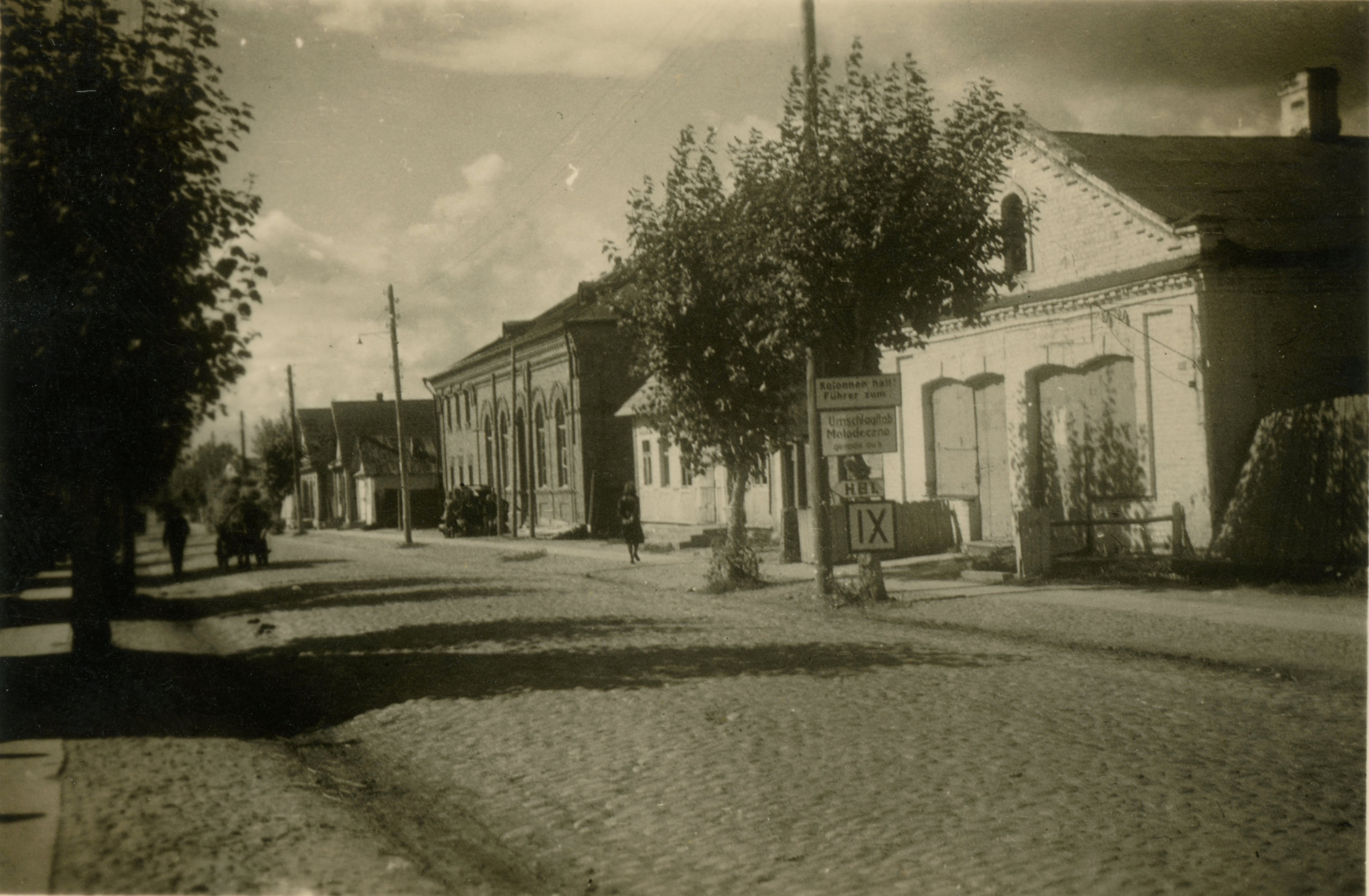
Mołodeczno in 1941

From 25 June 1941 until 5 July 1944, Maladzyechna was occupied by Nazi Germany and administered as a part of the Generalbezirk Weißruthenien of Reichskommissariat Ostland. On 13 and 18 July, the German Sonderkommando 7a and Einsatzkommando 9 committed massacres of some 100 people, almost entirely Jews. In June 1942, the Jewish ghetto was liquidated with some 700 Jews massacred near the city by the Sicherheitsdienst, and then some 25–30 Jews from a local forced labour camp were massacred on 7 September 1942, and the camp was eventually dissolved in July 1943 with the remaining Jews deported to Wilejka.

In 1941, the German Wehrmacht relocated the Dulag 112 prisoner-of-war camp from Orany to Mołodeczno, but it was soon relocated elsewhere and replaced by the infamous Stalag 342. Stalag 342 held Soviet POWs, and at least 30,000 people were killed.

On 5 July 1944, the advancing Red Army recaptured Maladzyechna in the course of the Vilnius Offensive. The town resumed its status as a part of the Byelorussian SSR. The heavy damage that Vileyka suffered during the war made it unsuitable to perform the role of the administrative centre, thus Maladzyechna, which was located only 20 kilometres away from Vileyka, became the new administrative centre when the civilian control was restored in the BSSR on 20 September 1944.

=== Post-war period ===
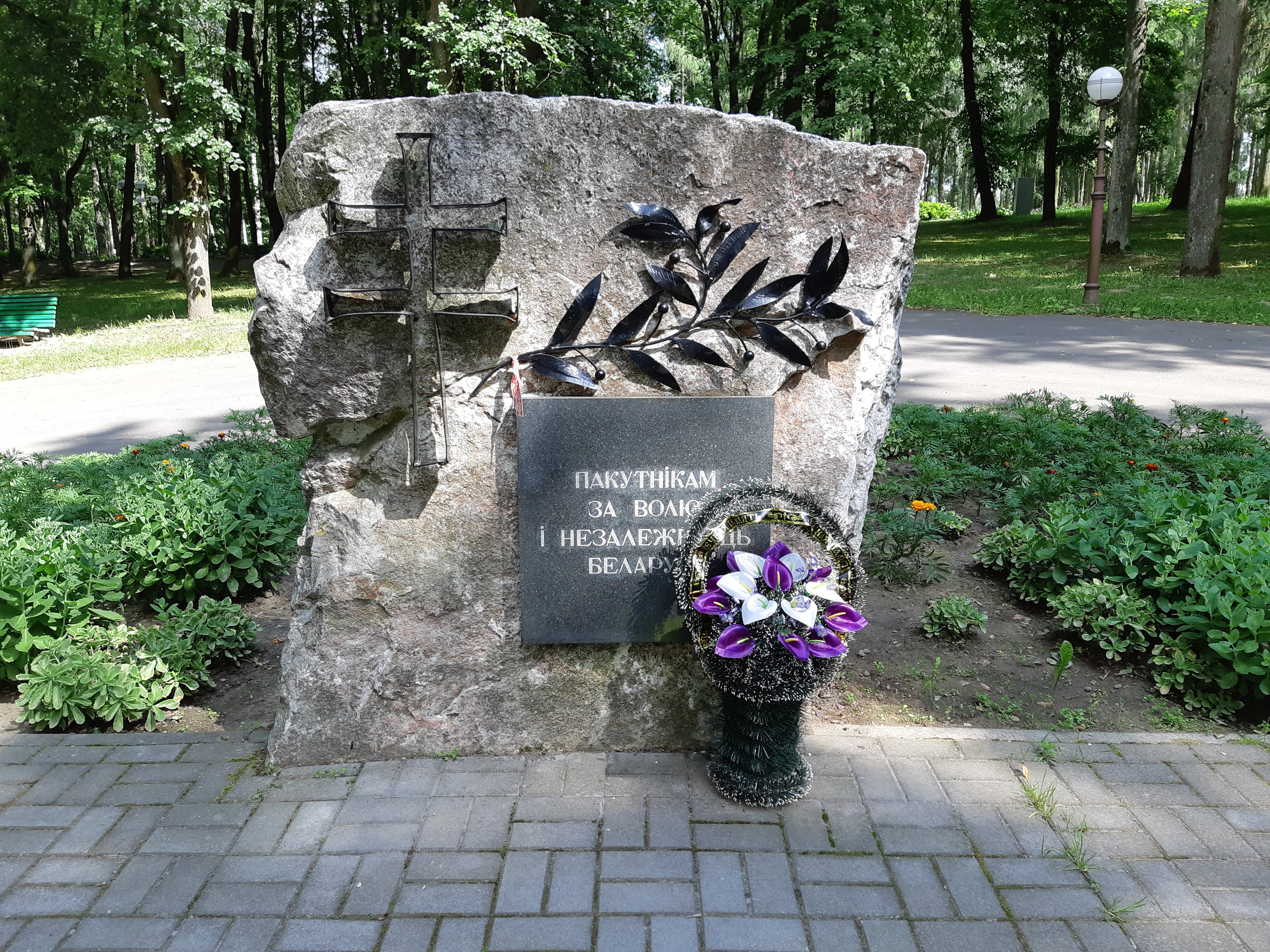
To the Martyrs for the Freedom and Independence of Belarus

Molodechno Region also survived the 1954 reform which halved the amount of regions in the BSSR, but on 20 January 1960, the Region was disestablished, and the town of Maladzyechna became part of the modern Minsk Region, in which it remains today as part of the Republic of Belarus.

== Sports ==
HC Dynama-Maladzechna of the Belarusian Extraleague is the local pro hockey team. The hockey team plays at the Maladzechna Ice Palace, with a capacity of 2000. FC Molodechno plays for the Belarusian First League, at City Stadium, which holds 4,800 people.

== Demographics ==
=== Population ===
In 2024, the town had a population of 89,068. In 2025, it was 88,290, and in 2026, it was 87,339.

== Partner cities ==
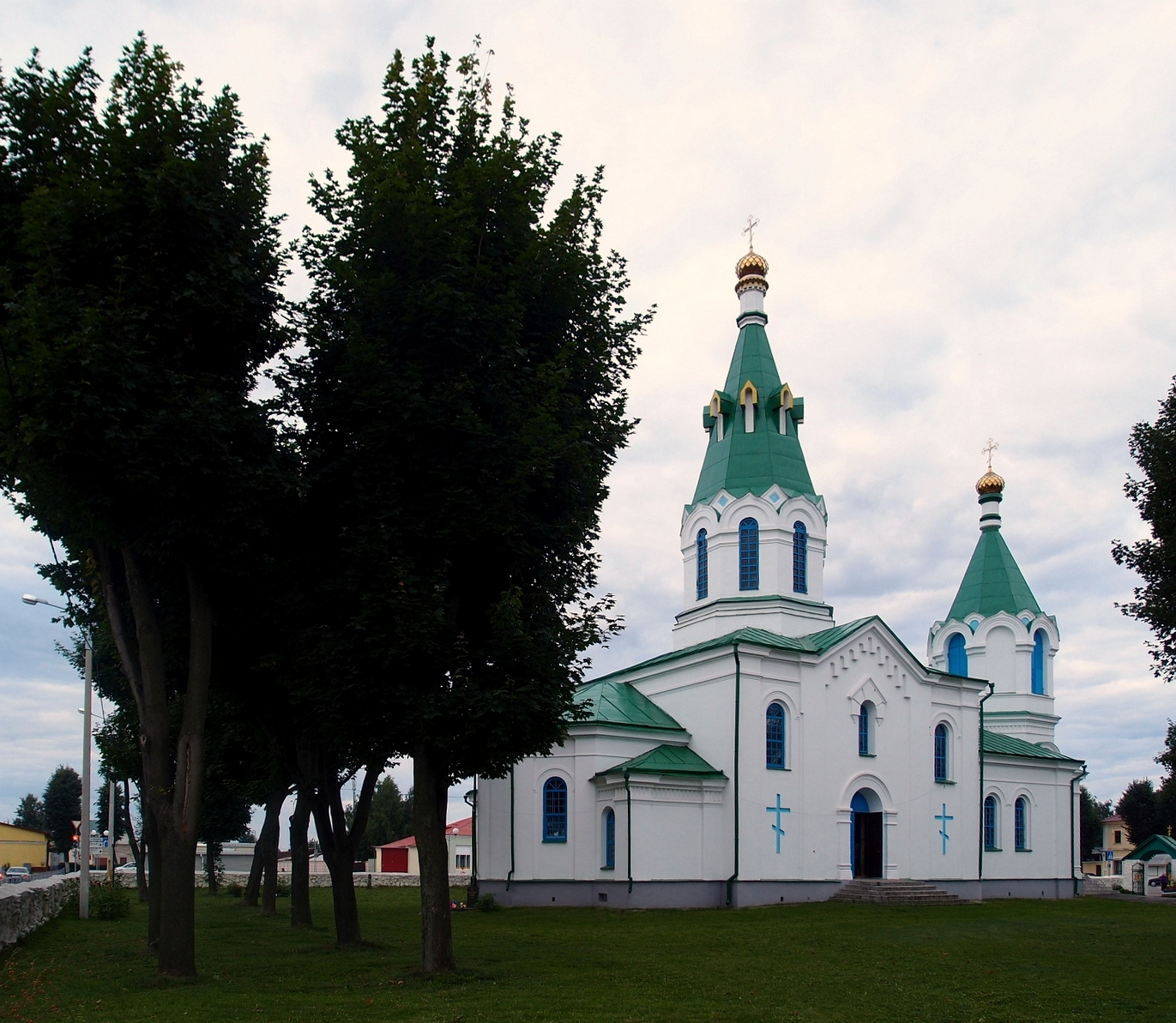
Church of the Holy Virgin

St. Josef Church

- Bor, Russia
- Cherepovets, Russia
- Kaluga, Russia
- Kolomna, Russia
- Floreşti, Moldova
- Velingrad, Bulgaria
- Esslingen am Neckar, Germany
- Jelgava, Latvia

== Sights ==
Near Maladziečna there is a VLF-transmitter for transmitting time signals.

== Notable residents ==
- Jan Stanisław Sapieha (1589–1635), son of Lew Sapieha, Marshal of the Grand Duchy of Lithuania
- Valentin Tishko (born 1989), Belarusian Christian and political activist
