= Maladzyechna district =

District of Minsk region, Belarus

Maladzyechna district Маладзечанскі раён (Belarusian) Молодечненский район (Russian)
- District
- Flag Coat of arms

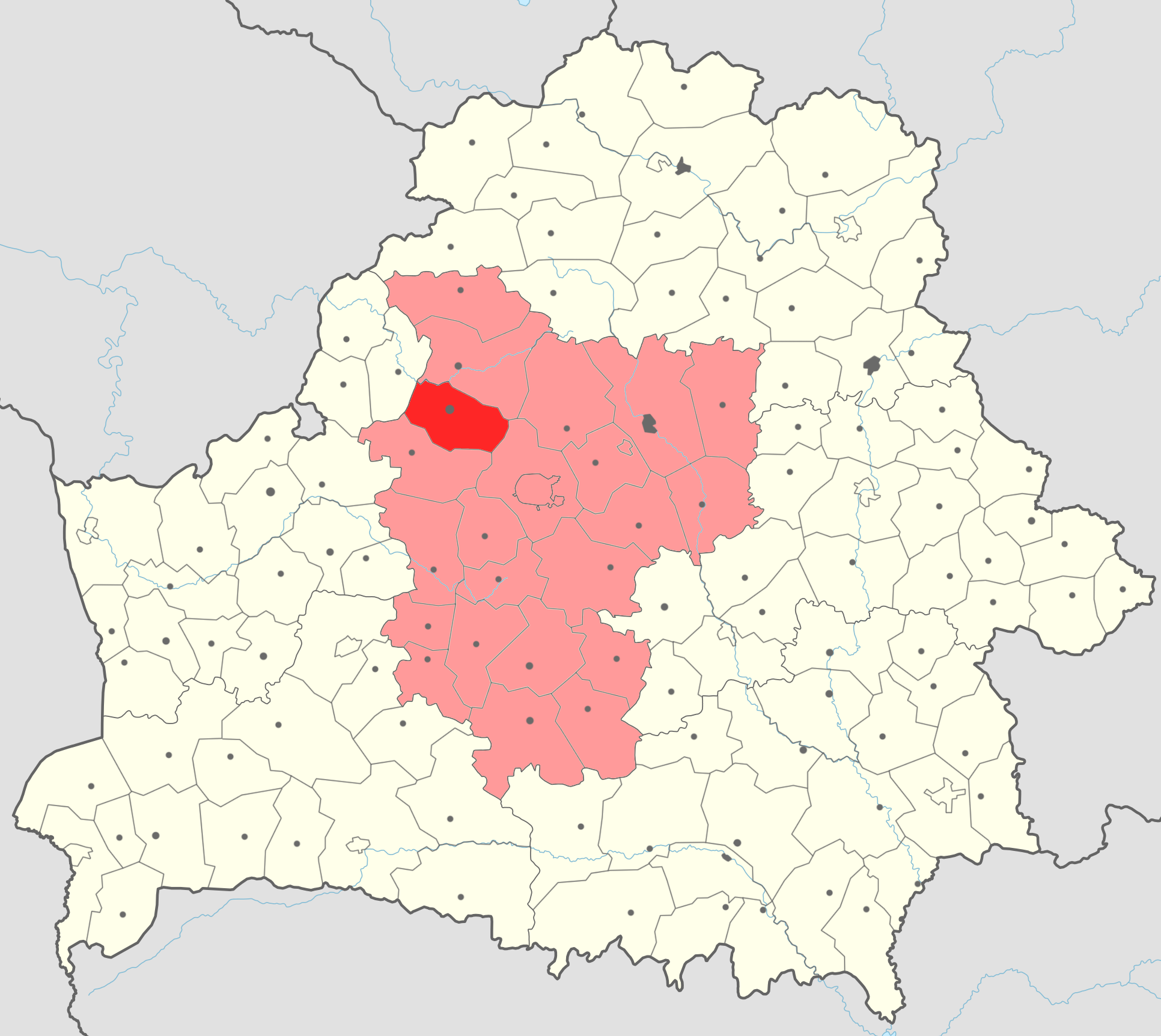
- Coordinates: 54.3136°N 26.8517°E
- Country: Belarus
- Region: Minsk region
- Administrative center: Maladzyechna

Area
  - District: 1,392 km^{2} (537 sq mi)

Population (2024)
  - District: 128,742
  - Density: 92.49/km^{2} (239.5/sq mi)
  - Urban: 95,282
  - Rural: 33,460
- Time zone: UTC+3 (MSK)
- Website: Maladzyechna ispolkom website

Maladzyechna district or Maladziečna district (Belarusian: Маладзечанскі раён, romanized: Maladziečanski rajon; Russian: Молодечненский район) is a district (raion) of Minsk region in Belarus. The administrative center is Maladzyechna. As of 2024, it has a population of 128,742.

== Geography ==
=== Main settlements ===
- Maladzyechna
- Radashkovichy
- Chysts
- Alyakhnovichy
- Palachany
- Vyvyery
- Khazhova

== Notable residents ==
- Mikola Abramchyk (1903, Syčavičy village - 1970), Belarusian politician and president of the Rada of the Belarusian Democratic Republic
- Janka Kupała (1882, Viazynka estate – 1942), Belarusian poet and writer
- Symon Rak-Michajłoŭski (1885, Maksimaŭka village - 1938), Belarusian politician and member of the Rada of the Belarusian Democratic Republic
- Tomasz Zan (1796, Miasata village – 1855), poet and activist
