= Tiger economy =

National economy that undergoes rapid growth

GDP per capita for the Four "Asian Tigers" (Singapore, Hong Kong, Taiwan and Korea) between 1960 and 2014

A tiger economy is the economy of a country which undergoes rapid economic growth, usually accompanied by an increase in the standard of living. The term was originally used for the Four Asian Tigers (South Korea, Taiwan, Hong Kong, and Singapore) as tigers are important in Asian symbolism, which also inspired the Tiger Cub Economies (Indonesia, Malaysia, Thailand, Vietnam and the Philippines). The Asian Tigers also inspired other economies later on; the Anatolian Tigers (certain cities in Turkey) in the 1980s, the Gulf Tiger (Dubai) in the 1990s, the Celtic Tiger (Republic of Ireland) in 1995–2000, the Baltic tigers (Baltic states) in 2000–2007, and the Tatra Tiger (Slovakia) in 2002–2007.

== History ==
In the 1960s, the Philippines, Sri Lanka and Myanmar were considered as the "Tiger of Asia" Economies as all three countries were experiencing high growth. Internal issues however led to the economies of all three countries to falter. Israel's rapid economic growth in the 1990s, and again in the 2000s and 2010s following a brief recession, earned it a reputation as a tiger economy, and one newspaper dubbed it the "Hebrew tiger." Bangladesh has been described as an emerging "Asian tiger" in recent years due to its high economic growth and industrialization which bear many similarities to the way the Four Asian Tigers industrialized between the 1960s and 1990s.

Another tiger economy is that of Armenia. Because of the remarkable, often two-digit economic growth that Armenia showed until the 2007–08 financial crisis, it emerged as the Caucasian Tiger. During this period, sustained economic growth allowed for economic stability, moderate fiscal deficits and external debt, as well as declining poverty rates.

The term "European Tiger" describes countries in Central and Eastern Europe, such as the Czech Republic, Hungary, Poland and Romania.

== Similar economies ==
The Pacific Pumas has been used to describe fast-growing and emerging economies in Latin America such as Mexico, Chile, Peru and Colombia.

The term lion economy or African Lions is used as an analogy to describe emerging economies in Africa. Countries considered to be "African Lions" are South Africa, Morocco, Algeria, Libya, Botswana, Egypt, Mauritius, and Tunisia.

The term "wolf economy" is used to describe Mongolia's rapidly growing economy.

=== Caucasian Tiger ===
The establishment of macroeconomic stability and the steadfast pursuit of reforms aimed at constructing a market economy that was integrated with the rest of the world are to be attributed for Armenia's emergence as the Caucasian Tiger. During the five years preceding 2007, the Armenian economy grew by double-digit rates annually on average—similar to the East Asian tiger economies—and had maintained high growth rates even before. During this same period, a number of countries engaged in foreign direct investment within the country.

Armenia quickly recovered from the shock typically experienced by economies that move away from a planned economy. From 1994, its growth levels matched that of countries in the Baltic and Central Europe and its recovery preceded that of other post-Soviet states by 4-5 years. Armenia's growth was caused by productivity gains in the private sector; Armenia rapidly expanded the role of private markets, and it adopted a free market economy, which included liberal trade in goods and services, as well as private ownership of assets (including land). Moreover, the defeat of inflation and predictability in financial policies' stance was caused by adopting responsible fiscal and monetary policies in the late 1990s. Thus, the foundations of impressive growth performance were laid because first-generation structural and institutional reforms were achieved. In 2022, similar double-digit economic growth has been observed; in particular, a 14% GDP growth has been estimated as a result of such factors as the influx of foreigners (mainly Russians) due to the Russian-Ukrainian war.

=== Celtic Tiger ===
The economy of Ireland was described as the "Celtic Tiger" from the mid-1990s to the late 2000s, for its rapid economic growth fuelled by foreign direct investment. The Irish economy expanded at an average rate of 9.4% between 1995 and 2000, and continued to grow at an average rate of 5.9% during the following decade until 2008, at which the collapse of a property bubble resulted in a severe economic downturn.

== See also ==
- Reform and opening up
- Economic miracle
- Tiger Cub Economies
