= The Pacific Pumas =

Pacific Latin American grouping: Chile, Colombia, Mexico, Peru

Pacific Pumas
- Dark green: The Four Pacific Pumas.
- Membership: Member states; Chile; Colombia; Mexico; Peru

Population
  - 2019 estimate: 229,377,463^{a}
- GDP (PPP): 2019 estimate
  - Total: $US 4.4 Trillion
  - Per capita: $US 19,182.35
- HDI (2021): ▲0.784 high
- 1. Combined census estimates of member states.

The Pacific Pumas are a political and economic grouping of countries along Latin America’s Pacific coast that includes Chile, Colombia, Mexico and Peru. The term references the four larger Pacific Latin American emerging markets that share common trends of positive growth, stable macroeconomic foundations, improved governance and an openness to global integration.

The term was coined by political economist Samuel George in 2012, and developed in a 2014 study authored by George and published by the Bertelsmann Foundation entitled The Pacific Pumas: An Emerging Model for Emerging Markets.

== Overview ==
The Puma, an American cat found along Latin America's Pacific Coast, is “rapid, agile, intelligent, independent, and strong”: qualities attributed to the Chilean, Colombian, Mexican, and Peruvian economies in the 21st century.

The term was coined to emphasize that quietly and efficiently, Pacific Pumas have distinguished themselves from other large Latin American emerging markets in terms of economic growth and stability, commitment to democracy, and global integration. The name references the Four Asian Tigers of the 1990s whose successes the Pumas wish to emulate, and just like the Tigers, the Pumas adopted a model based on macroeconomic stability and global integration, with a particular focus on East Asia. The term also suggests that the model of economic development and democratic governance adopted by the Pumas could be a model for global emerging markets more broadly. In a Wall Street Journal feature, journalist Mary Anastasia O'Grady described the development model of the Pumas, in terms of a focus on openness, currency stability, fiscal restraint, and competition as "doing the heavy lifting" to ensure economic success.

== Economic growth and stability ==
Puma growth averaged 4.9 per cent annually from 2005 to 2013 in the four countries, compared to 4.4 percent in the Asian Tigers. This growth has allowed the four countries to make inroads against poverty, without sacrificing their business-friendly disposition. The Pacific Pumas have also distinguished themselves in terms of their macroeconomic stability. Inflation has been held within central bank bands across the four economies, with average annual inflation below 3 percent since 2009, and ranging from 1.73 per cent to 3.60 percent in 2013 across the four countries.

The Pacific Pumas have been early adopters of managed currency floats, meaning that domestic currency conversion rates are allowed to fluctuate based on market impulses. Central banks help guide or stabilize movements via foreign exchange interventions, such as calls or puts on US dollars, or swaps that offer hedges without committing reserves.

The flexible rates have allowed the Pumas to absorb shocks to their real economies, perhaps best evidenced during the 2008 financial crisis. By January 2009, Chilean, Colombian and Peruvian currencies had all fallen sharply against the dollar as investors rushed to perceived safety. Such pressure has previously proven disastrous in emerging markets where rigid currencies and brittle monetary systems ultimately cracked under stress, including during the 1997 Asian financial crisis. However, with the flexibility of the float, Puma central banks were not forced to exhaust reserves defending pegs, nor were they forced to gamble against speculators betting on devaluations. The Pumas absorbed the rapid depreciation and rebounded swiftly.

The governments have also demonstrated a commitment to debt reduction and fiscal restraint. For example, Chile has effectively eliminated its public debt while Peru transformed its structural deficits into structural surpluses.

Positive economic developments have seen returns in terms of investor interest. The Pumas attract four of every ten dollars invested in Latin America.

Country	Population millions (2014)	Population Aged 0–14 percent (2014)	Average GDP growth 2004-2013 (excluding 2009) percent (2014)	Average Export growth 2004-2013 percent (2014)	Inflation percent(2013)	Average Private Consumption Growth forecast 2013-2018 percent (2014)	Average Gross Fixed Investment Growth forecast 2013-2018 percent (2014)	Ease of Doing Business Rank (Latin America) (2013)	Competitiveness Rank (Latin America) (2013)	Macroeconomic Environment Rank (Latin America) (2013)
Chile	17.40	21	5.42	3.61	1.73	5.00	6.88	1	1	1
Colombia	48.2	27	5.05	6.59	2.22	4.47	6.43	3	6	4
Mexico	120.1	29	3.39	5.72	3.60	3.58	6.75	4	3	6
Peru	31.42	29	7.28	4.83	2.81	5.43	7.38	2	5	2

== Improved democracy ==
The Pacific Pumas have also distinguished themselves in terms of improved democracy and governance, both from other countries in Latin America as well as other emerging markets around the globe. Politically, the four countries have been observing the "rules of the game". All four countries have executed peaceful political transitions from right-leaning to left-leaning governments (and vice versa) in the past decade. Leaders, both left and right, have governed moderately, generally respecting executive restraint.

The Pumas’ democratic maturation is still ongoing, with crucial Mexican reforms, potential Chilean Constitutional Reforms, and the Colombian peace process still on the horizon. The improved governance has however, played a factor in the Pumas taking the top places among Latin American nations in the World Bank’s 2014 Ease of Doing Business survey.

== Global integration ==
The Pacific Pumas have actively pursued real integration in Europe, East Asia and the Americas—and approach that has provoked comparisons to the Asian Tigers. Individually the Pumas have free-trade agreements (FTAs) with the United States, the European Union and various countries of Pacific East Asia. The four Pumas account for over 50 percent of Latin America’s trade, and their combined global trade with the rest of the world totaled US$1.04 trillion in 2013.

Additionally, the Pumas are moving forward with trade liberalization at a time when World Trade Organization dialogues have stalled.

=== The Pacific Pumas and the Pacific Alliance ===
The Pacific Pumas consist of the founding members of the Pacific Alliance—a trade and integration pact founded in 2012. The Pacific Pumas refers both to the individual advancements and opportunities of the four countries and to broader global potential of the four together. Thus, the concept encompasses more than simply the Pacific Alliance.

On February 10, 2014, the Presidents of the four countries met in Cartagena, Colombia, for the VIII Summit of the Pacific Alliance, and formally signed agreements eliminating tariffs on 92 percent of the trade between them. The remaining 8 percent of trade is expected to be gradually liberalized over the next few years, with the majority of this 8 percent covering “sensitive” sectors such as coffee, bananas, and sugar.

The fact that the Alliance members are not significant trading partners with each other suggests that benefits beyond trade liberalization exist among the four Pumas. The Alliance is also dedicated to creating MILA, an integrated stock exchange.

At the IX Summit of the Pacific Alliance, the topic of potential integration of the Alliance with Mercosur was expected to be breached. Such integration would face challenges due to the differences in approach to trade liberalization between the two blocs.

=== The Pacific Pumas and transatlantic relations ===
The Pacific Pumas positive disposition towards democracy and integration make the four countries potential partners for both the European Union and the United States. The United States joined the Pacific Alliance as an observer in July 2013, and remains a crucial trade partner for the Puma economies. Mexico alone has sent an annual average of 82 percent of its exports to the United States since 2002, while Colombia shipped 39 percent of its exports to the United States between 2010 and 2012. Combined, the Pumas are the EU’s eighth largest trading partner, surpassing both Brazil and India.

=== The Pacific Pumas and Asia ===
The name Pacific Pumas also alludes to the quartet’s goal of expanding economic relations with emerging East Asia. Chile, Mexico, and Peru are active participants in negotiations for the Trans-Pacific Partnership. At the presentation of the Pacific Pumas study on March 13, Mexican Ambassador to the United States Eduardo Medina Mora emphasized that the group of four countries can act as a “Bridge to Asia.”

The Pumas’ relationship with Asia, particularly China, can be considered both cooperative as well as competitive. Chile and Peru in particular rely on China as an export market for their natural resources, as well as higher value-added products such as Chilean wine. Mexico, on the other hand, competes with China in terms of exporting manufactured goods to the North American market.

== See also ==
- Developed country
- Developmental state
- Four Asian Tigers
- Economic miracle (full list of miracles and "tigers")
- Asian Century
- Baltic Tiger
- Celtic Tiger
- Tatra Tiger
- Newly industrialized country
- Gulf Tiger
- Lee Kuan Yew
- Korean Wave
- Japanese economic miracle
- Miracle on the Han River
- Taiwan Miracle
- Nylonkong
- List of country groupings
- List of multilateral free-trade agreements
