= Anatolian Tigers =

Cities in Turkey known for economic growth since the 1980s

In the context of the Turkish economy, Anatolian Tigers (Turkish: Anadolu Kaplanları) are a number of cities in Turkey which have displayed significant growth records since the 1980s, as well as a defined breed of entrepreneurs rising in prominence and who can often be traced back to the cities in question and who generally rose from the status of small and medium enterprises.

Where particular cities are concerned, the term is most often used for the capitals or depending centers of Denizli, Gaziantep, Kayseri, Balıkesir, Konya, Kahramanmaraş, Bursa and İzmit. Within Turkey, the accent is laid on cities that have received little state investment or subsidies over the years. Ordu, Çorum, Denizli, Gaziantep and Kahramanmaraş, in particular, are cited among the cities who "made it themselves". In time order, while Denizli in Turkey's Aegean Region was the early hour precursor for rapid growth in an Anatolian Tiger pattern, Gaziantep, Malatya, Konya and Kayseri are the most recently cited prominent Tigers on the basis of the number of companies they have among Turkey's 500 biggest. These largest are the forerunners of further large companies and a multitude of smaller ones.

Aside from their production units, the definition generally excludes companies who have their headquarters in the largest cities of Turkey; namely Istanbul, Ankara, İzmir, Bursa and Adana, as well as companies constituted with public capital. The term is also echoed, in the form "Anatolian Lions" (Turkish: Anadolu Aslanları), by the name of the private sector association Askon that brings together businessmen from a number of other cities who have found common grounds between each other. This association has branches in Ankara, Burdur, Bursa, Gebze, İzmit, Konya, Malatya and Trabzon. These lions are less often cited among the tigers for several reasons. Other variations of the term, such "Turkey's Tigers" or "Turkish Tigers", as used by the PBS without excluding the most commonly used form of "Anatolian Tigers" have also been pronounced.

City	No. of companies
Denizli	29
Gaziantep & Kayseri	23
Balıkesir	15
Konya	14
Kahramanmaraş	9
Ordu	7
Samsun	5
Çorum	8
Trabzon & Ünye	4
Kütahya & Niğde	3
Adıyaman & Afyonkarahisar & Çankırı & Giresun & Isparta & Karaman & Malatya	2

Beyond their shared characteristics in an economical perspective, references have also been made, especially in international media, to different political connotations within the term, including by associating this capital with Islamic values or extending its whole under such definitions as "Islamic capital" or "green capital". The political choices and the voting trends of the cities and of particulars in question may differ widely between each other. A 2005 study by the European Stability Initiative that was focused on Kayseri uses the term "Islamic Calvinists" to define the entrepreneurs and their values. Several business awards or conferences in Turkey draw reference from the term "Anatolian Tigers" or its variants. The term was copied after the Asian Tigers.

== Geographical distribution ==
According to the 2005 Istanbul Chamber of Industry's annual ranking of Turkey's top 1000 industrial enterprises, the adjacent table contains cities which best fit the definition of Anatolian Tigers. Among these cities Trabzon has one company in top 25.

== See also ==
- Economy of Turkey
- Turkish Riviera
- Tiger economy
- Tiger Cub Economies
