= Gulf Tiger =

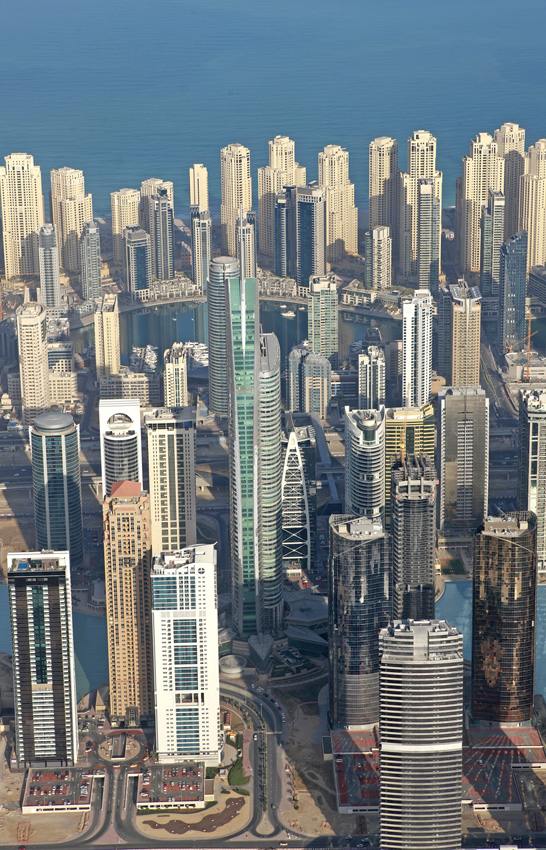

The Gulf Tiger or Arab Gulf Tiger is a nickname used to describe the period of rapid economic growth in the city of Dubai. The boom that Dubai has been experiencing since the 1990s is still going on, transforming the city from a desert village to a world class economic hub.

== Characteristics ==
The city of Dubai is the second most prosperous emirate of the United Arab Emirates, after Abu Dhabi, and with a cosmopolitan population of 1.6 million.

Dubai shares a range of characteristics with other tiger economies including a sustained double-digit GDP growth rate since 1994. In 2004 Dubai's GDP grew 17%, mostly in the non-oil sectors.

== Diversification ==
Dubai's oil production dropped steadily from an all-time high of 450,000 barrels per day in 1995 to less than 100,000 in 2005. But as the contribution of oil to GDP dwindled, the economy expanded. It almost doubled in size during the 1991-2000 period.

== Economic development ==
Dubai attracts a great deal of foreign direct investment (FDI). FDI has been growing with an annual rate of 11% in recent years. 90 companies of the Fortune 100 list have located their regional offices in the city.

The demographics of the city have changed dramatically, with Emiratis making up only 12% of Dubai, with estimates indicating the share dropping to 1% in 2020.

== See also ==
- Dubai Inc.
- Economy of Dubai
- Four Asian Tigers
- Tiger Cub Economies
- Celtic Tiger
- Tatra Tiger
- Baltic Tiger
- Tiger economy
