= Science in newly industrialized countries =

Scientific research is concentrated in the developed world, with only a marginal contribution from the rest of the world. Many newly industrialized countries have been trying to establish scientific institutions, but with limited success. There is an insufficient dedicated, inspired and motivated labor pool for science and insufficient investment in science education.

== The limited success of Newly Industrialized Countries ==
The reason that there have been so few scientists, who have made their mark globally, from most NIC's (Newly Industrialized Countries) is partly historical and partly social A true scientist is nurtured from the school upwards to scientific establishments. Only if there are inspired and dedicated school science teachers in abundance, there will be a sufficient number of inspired students who would like to take science as a career option and who may one day become a successful scientist.

== The common thread ==
A common thread can indeed be discerned in the state of science in many NICs. Thus although, most of the science establishments in the major NICs can be said to be doing fairly well, none of them have been as successful as the developed countries.

After the Second World War, a small technical elite arose in developing countries such as India, Pakistan, Brazil, and Iraq who had been educated as scientists in the industrialized world. They spearheaded the development of science in these countries, presuming that by pushing for Manhattan Project-type enterprises in nuclear power, electronics, pharmaceuticals, or space exploration they could leapfrog the dismally low level of development of science establishments in their countries. India, for example, started a nuclear energy program that mobilized thousands of technicians and cost hundreds of millions of dollars but had limited success. Though China, North Korea, India and Pakistan have been successful in deploying nuclear weapons and some of them e.g. China and India have launched fairly successful space programs, (for example, Chandrayaan I (Sanskrit चंद्रयान-1), which literally means "Moon Craft," is an unmanned lunar mission by the Indian Space Research Organisation that hoped to land a motorised rover on the Moon in 2010 or 2011 as a part of its second Chandrayaan mission; Chang'e I, China's Moon probing project is proceeding in a well-organized way), the fact remains that most of the scientists responsible for these deeds had received their terminal education from some institution or university in US or Europe. In addition there have been hardly any Nobel laureates in science who have conducted the path-breaking research in a native science establishment.

== Science in Brazil ==
Brazilian science effectively began in the 19th century. Until then, Brazil was a poor colony, without universities, printing presses, libraries, museums, etc. This was perhaps a deliberate policy of the Portuguese colonial power, because they feared that the appearance of educated Brazilian classes would boost nationalism and aspirations toward political independence.

The first attempts of having a Brazilian science establishment were made around 1783, with the expedition of Portuguese naturalist Alexandre Rodrigues, who was sent by Portugal's prime minister, the Marquis of Pombal, to explore and identify Brazilian fauna, flora and geology. His collections, however, were lost to the French, when Napoleon invaded, and were transported to Paris by Étienne Geoffroy Saint-Hilaire. In 1772, the first learned society, the Sociedade Scientifica, was founded in Rio de Janeiro, but lasted only until 1794. Also, in 1797, the first botanic institute was founded in Salvador, Bahia. In the second and third decades of the twentieth century, the main universities in Brazil were organised from a set of existing medical, engineering and law schools. The University of Brazil dates from 1927, the University of São Paulo - today the largest in the Country - dates from 1934.

Today, Brazil has a well-developed organization of science and technology. Basic research in science is largely carried out in public universities and research centers and institutes, and some in private institutions, particularly in non-profit non-governmental organizations. More than 90% of funding for basic research comes from governmental sources.

Applied research, technology and engineering is also largely carried out in the university and research centers system, contrary-wise to more developed countries such as the United States, South Korea, Germany, Japan, etc. A significant trend is emerging lately. Companies such as Motorola, Samsung, Nokia and IBM have established large R&D&I centers in Brazil. One of the incentive factors for this, besides the relatively lower cost and high sophistication and skills of Brazilian technical manpower, has been the so-called Informatics Law, which exempts from certain taxes up to 5% of the gross revenue of high technology manufacturing companies in the fields of telecommunications, computers, digital electronics, etc. The Law has attracted annually more than 1,5 billion dollars of investment in Brazilian R&D&I. Multinational companies have also discovered that some products and technologies designed and developed by Brazilians are significantly competitive and are appreciated by other countries, such as automobiles, aircraft, software, fiber optics, electric appliances, and so on.

The challenges Brazilian science faces today are: to expand the system with quality, supporting the installed competence; transfer knowledge from the research sector to industry; embark on government action in strategic areas; enhance the assessment of existing programmes and commence innovative projects in areas of relevance for the Country. Furthermore, scientific dissemination plays a fundamental role in transforming the perception of the public at large of the importance of science in modern life. The government has undertaken to meet these challenges using institutional base and the operation of existing qualified scientists.

== Science in China ==
China was a world leader in science and technology until the early years of the Ming dynasty. Chinese discoveries and Chinese innovations such as papermaking, printing, the compass, and gunpowder (the Four Great Inventions) contributed to the economic development in East Asia, the Middle East and Europe. A question that has been intriguing many historians studying China is the fact that China did not develop a scientific revolution and Chinese technology fell behind that of Europe. Many hypotheses have been proposed ranging from the cultural to the political and economic. has argued that China indeed had a scientific revolution in the 17th century and that we are still far from understanding the scientific revolutions of the West and China in all their political, economic and social ramifications. Some like John K. Fairbank are of the opinion that the Chinese political system was hostile to scientific progress.

Needham argued, and most scholars agreed, that cultural factors prevented these Chinese achievements from developing into what could be called "science". It was the religious and philosophical framework of the Chinese intellectuals which made them unable to believe in the ideas of laws of nature. More recent historians have questioned political and cultural explanations and have focused more on economic causes. Mark Elvin's high level equilibrium trap is one well-known example of this line of thought, as well as Kenneth Pomeranz' argument that resources from the New World made the crucial difference between European and Chinese development.

Thus, it was not that there was no order in nature for the Chinese, but rather that it was not an order ordained by a rational personal being, and hence there was no conviction that rational personal beings would be able to spell out in their lesser earthly languages the divine code of laws which he had decreed aforetime. The Taoists, indeed, would have scorned such an idea as being too naive for the subtlety and complexity of the universe as they intuited it. Similar grounds have been found for questioning much of the philosophy behind traditional Chinese medicine, which, derived mainly from Taoist philosophy, reflects the classical Chinese belief that individual human experiences express causative principles effective in the environment at all scales. Because its theory predates use of the scientific method, it has received various criticisms based on scientific thinking. Even though there are physically verifiable anatomical or histological bases for the existence of acupuncture points or meridians, for instance skin conductance measurements show increases at the predicted points.

Today, science and technology establishment in the People's Republic of China is growing rapidly. Even as many Chinese scientists debate what institutional arrangements will be best for Chinese science, reforms of the Chinese Academy of Sciences continue. The average age of researchers at the Chinese Academy of Sciences has dropped by nearly ten years between 1991 and 2003. However, many of them are educated in the United States and other foreign countries.

Chinese university undergraduate and graduate enrollments more than doubled from 1995 to 2005. The universities now have more cited PRC papers than CAS in the Science Citation Index. Some Chinese scientists say CAS is still ahead on overall quality of scientific work but that lead will only last five to ten years.

Several Chinese immigrants to the United States have also been awarded the Nobel Prize, including:, Samuel C. C. Ting, Chen Ning Yang, Tsung-Dao Lee, Daniel C. Tsui, and Gao Xingjian. Other overseas ethnic Chinese that have achieved success in sciences include Fields Medal recipient Shing-Tung Yau and Terence Tao, and Turing Award recipient Andrew Yao. Tsien Hsue-shen was a prominent scientist at NASA's Jet Propulsion Laboratory, while Chien-Shiung Wu contributed to the Manhattan Project (some argue she never received the Nobel Prize unlike her colleagues Tsung-Dao Lee and Chen Ning Yang due to sexism by the selection committee). Others include Charles K. Kao, a pioneer in fiber optics technology, and Dr. David Ho, one of the first scientists to propose that AIDS was caused by a virus, thus subsequently developing combination antiretroviral therapy to combat it. Dr. Ho was named TIME magazine's 1996 Man of the Year. In 2015, Tu Youyou, a pharmaceutical chemist, became the first native Chinese scientist, born and educated and carried out research exclusively in the People's Republic of China, to receive the Nobel Prize in natural sciences.

== Science in India ==
The earliest applications of science in India took place in the context of medicine, metallurgy, construction technology (such as ship building, manufacture of cement and paints) and in textile production and dyeing. But in the process of understanding chemical processes, led to some theories about physical processes and the forces of nature that are today studied as specific topics within the fields of chemistry and physics.

Many mathematical concepts today were contributed by Indian mathematicians like Aryabhata.

There was really no place for scientists in the Indian caste system. Thus while there were/are castes for the learned brahmins, the warriors kshatriyas, the traders vaishyas and the menial workers shudras, maybe even the bureaucrats (the kayasths) there was/is hardly any formal place in the social hierarchy for a people who discover new knowledge or invent new devices based on the recently discovered knowledge, even though scientific temper has always been in India, in the form of logic, reasoning and method of acquiring knowledge. Its therefore no wonder that some Indians quickly learned to value science, especially those belonging to the privileged Brahmin caste during the British colonial rule that lasted over two centuries. Some Indians did succeed to achieve notable success and fame, examples include Satyendra Nath Bose, Meghnad Saha, Jagdish Chandra Bose and C. V. Raman even though they belonged to different castes. The science communication had begun with publication of a scientific journal, Asiatick Researches in 1788. Thereafter, the science communication in India has evolved in many facets. Following this, there has been a continuing development in the formation of scientific institutions and publication of scientific literature. Subsequently, scientific publications also started appearing in Indian languages by the end of eighteenth century. The publication of ancient scientific literature and textbooks at mass scale started in the beginning of nineteenth century. The scientific and technical terms, however, had been a great difficulty for a long time for popular science writing.

== See also ==
- Science and technology in Iran
- Science and technology in Pakistan
- Science and technology in the Philippines
- Science and technology in Turkey
