= Flying geese paradigm =

View that the economic policies of postwar Japan will uplift Asian economies

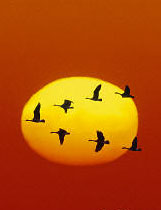
Geese in V formation

The flying geese paradigm (Japanese: 雁行形態論, Hepburn: Gankō keitai-ron) is a view of Japanese scholars regarding technological development in East Asia which sees Japan as a leading power. It was developed in the 1930s, but gained wider popularity in the 1960s, after its author, Kaname Akamatsu, published his ideas in the Journal of Developing Economies.

== Akamatsu's third flying geese paradigm ==
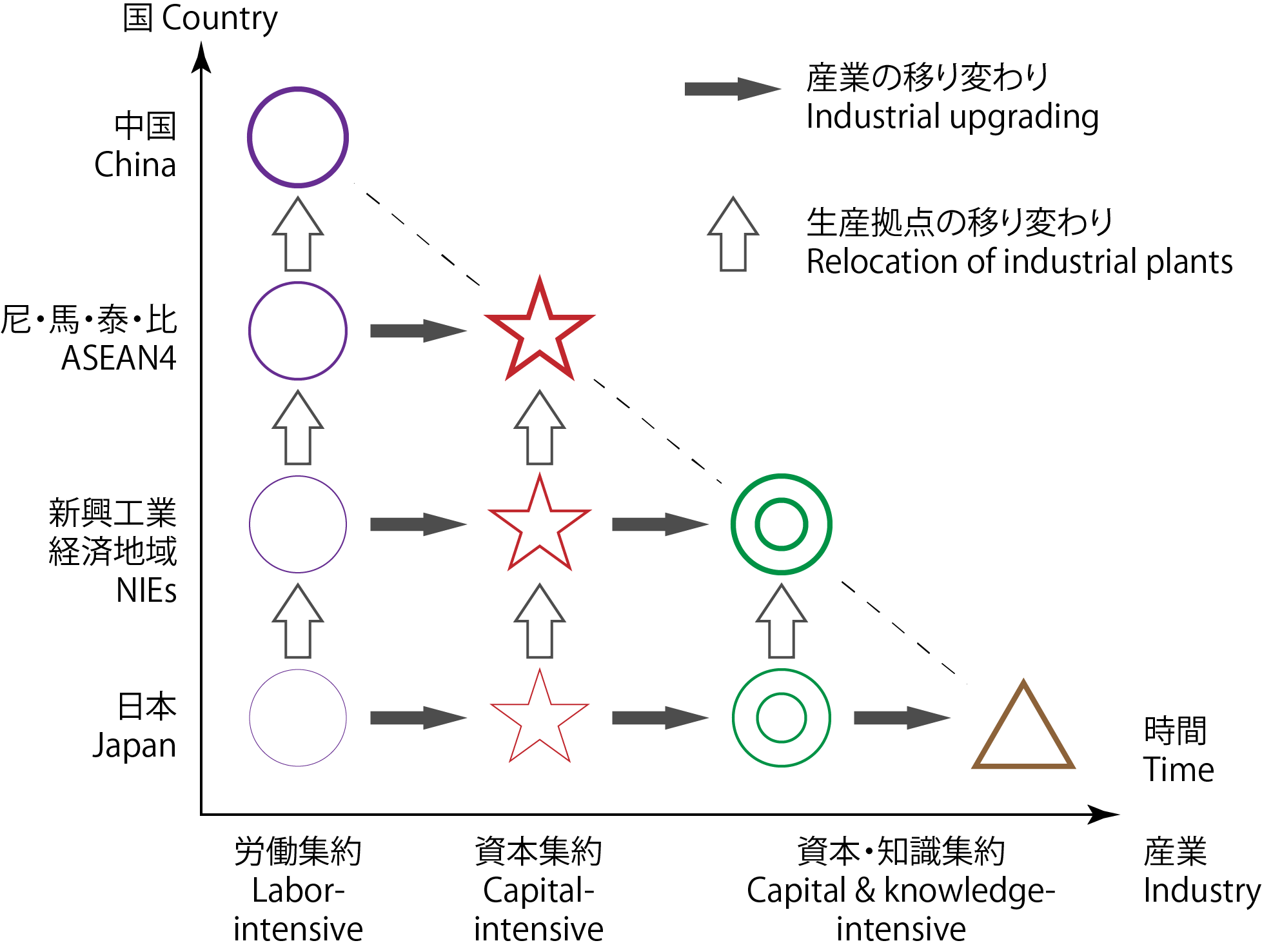
The flying geese paradigm

Akamatsu's third flying geese paradigm (FGP) is a model for the international division of labor in East Asia based on dynamic comparative advantage. The paradigm postulated that Asian nations will catch up with the West as a part of a regional hierarchy where the production of commoditized goods would continuously move from the more advanced countries to the less advanced ones. The underdeveloped nations in the region could be considered to be "aligned successively behind the advanced industrial nations in the order of their different stages of growth in a wild-geese-flying pattern." The lead goose in this pattern is Japan itself, the second-tier of nations consists of the newly industrializing economies (South Korea, Singapore, Taiwan, and Hong Kong). After these two groups come the main ASEAN countries: Thailand, Malaysia, Indonesia, and the Philippines. Finally, the least developed major nations in the region: China, Vietnam, etc. make up the rearguard in the formation.

The main driver in the model is the "leader's imperative for internal restructuring" due to increasing labor costs. As the comparative advantages (on a global scale) of the "lead goose" causes it to shift further and further away from labor-intensive production to more capital-intensive activities it sheds its low-productivity production to nations further down in the hierarchy in a pattern that then reproduces itself between the countries in the lower tiers. The impulse for development always comes from the top tier causing many to label the FGP a top-down model. The FGP has proved to be a useful tool when describing the regional production patterns in East Asia as industries such as the textile industry has left not only Japan – the most advanced East Asian nation – but also, at a later point, South Korea, and Taiwan etc. These second-tier nations have now firmly established themselves in for instance the automotive industry and advanced production of consumer electronics and the like.

The vehicle for technology transfer is where Akamatsu's framework is least developed. He does however suggest that the demonstration effect of international trade plays an important part as well as the "animal spirit of the entrepreneurs" in developing countries. More recently, modified versions of the FGP – such as the one presented in Ozawa (1995) – stress the importance of transnational firms in this area.

Regarding the internal order of nations within the model, Akamatsu did not consider the relative positions to be permanently fixed but could rather be seen as inherently unstable. This idea is most likely connected to the memories of the Japanese development in the early 20th century when it catapulted itself from a technological backwater to a mature industrial powerhouse. Other scholars, however, have emphasized the stability and harmony of the clustered growth envisaged in the FGP implying it would be difficult for a nation to shift from one tier to another.

== Relevance of Akamatsu's paradigm ==
Akamatsu's theory emphasizes the differentiation of the world economy, which leads to the rapid diffusion of new techniques to rising industrial nations, which starts with the import of new commodities by these nations. In time, techniques and capital goods are imported as well, and homogenous industries are being established. The uniformization of both industry and agriculture gave rise to the fierce and conflictive competition between Europe, the United States and Japan in the last quarter of the 19th Century. When innovation occurs in some industries in an advanced nation, investment is concentrated there, causing a rise in the trade cycle. Innovation leads to an increase in exports, and the nation's prosperity creates and increases the import of raw materials and foodstuffs. Akamatsu sees a counter-movement in other parts of the world, centered on the rising production of gold, which, according to him, leads to an increase in effective demand and further stimulates exports of the innovating nation. In that way, world production and trade expand, prices increase and a worldwide rise in the long-term trade cycle results.

However, innovations spread from the innovating nations to other nations, leading to the development of industries in those countries, with the result of a conflictive relationship with the industries of the innovating nation. Exports of the innovating nation become stagnant, and on the world level, there is a tendency towards overproduction, prices turn downwards, and the rates of growth of production and trade fall. The first, rising A-phase of the Kondratiev cycle will be according to Akamatsu a period of differentiation in the world economic structure, while the "falling period" or B-phase of the Kondratiev cycle will, Akamatsu argues, coincide with a process of uniformization in world economic structure.

For Akamatsu, the characteristic structure of the Center-Periphery relationship is characterized by the fact that the underdeveloped nation will export primary products and will import industrial goods for consumption. Later on, an underdeveloped nation will attempt to produce goods that were hitherto imported, first in the field of consumer goods, and later on in the area of capital goods. As the fourth stage of the process, the underdeveloped nation will attempt to export capital goods. There will be a tendency of "advanced" differentiation in the world economy, however, because the capital goods industries in advanced nations will still advance further, giving rise to "extreme differences of comparative costs". The wild-geese flying pattern will include three sub-patterns: the first is the sequence of imports – domestic production – exports. The second will be the sequence from consumer goods to capital goods and from crude and simple articles to complex and refined articles. The third will be the alignment from the advanced nations to backward nations according to their stages of growth.

However, there is a darker and more somber nature of these cycles as well – the condition of discrepancy will be met, Akamatsu argues, by means of imports, leading to discrepancies in the balance of payments, and the pressure to increase exports of primary products to improve the balance. Discrepancies will also lead to a shift of production away from domestic industries in the underdeveloped country towards the export sector; leading, in the end, also to problems of excessive supply capacities in the underdeveloped country etc.

At the end of the day, Akamatsu believes in a Hegelian dialectic between the three basic discrepancies, characterizing the process of development: the discrepancy of development, the cyclical discrepancy between the rich and the poor countries, and the structural discrepancy.

== Criticism ==
The ongoing and deepening financial stagnation of Japan has cast doubts on the applicability of the Japanese model of economic development. Economist Terutomo Ozawa argues that Japan's initial economic success was underpinned by financial institutions that led to its current economic malaise.

== See also ==
- Japanese economic miracle
- Lost Decades

== Bibliography ==
- Akamatsu, K. (1962). "A historical pattern of economic growth in developing countries". The Developing Economies. 1 (1): 3–25. doi:10.1111/j.1746-1049.1962.tb01020.x.
- Cumings, Bruce (1984). "The origins and development of the Northeast Asian political economy: industrial sectors, product cycles, and political consequences". International Organization. 38 (1): 1–40. doi:10.1017/S0020818300004264. JSTOR 2706600. S2CID 155038080.
- Walter F. Hatch (15 March 2011). Asia's Flying Geese: How Regionalization Shapes Japan. Cornell University Press. ISBN 978-0-8014-5748-7.
- Kasahara, S. (2004). "The Flying Geese Paradigm: A Critical study of Its Application to East Asian Regional Development" (PDF). United Nations Conference on Trade and Development. pp. Discussion Paper 169. CiteSeerX 10.1.1.871.3739.
- Ozawa, Terutomo (2006). Institutions, Industrial Upgrading, and Economic Performance in Japan: The "flying-geese" Paradigm of Catch-up Growth. Edward Elgar. ISBN 978-1-84720-197-3.
- Terry, Edith (2015) [2002]. How Asia Got Rich: Japan, China and the Asian Miracle. Routledge. ISBN 978-1-317-46850-9. - Article: How Asia Got Rich
