= Pacific Alliance =

Latin American trade agreement

Pacific Alliance Alianza del Pacífico (Spanish)
- Emblem

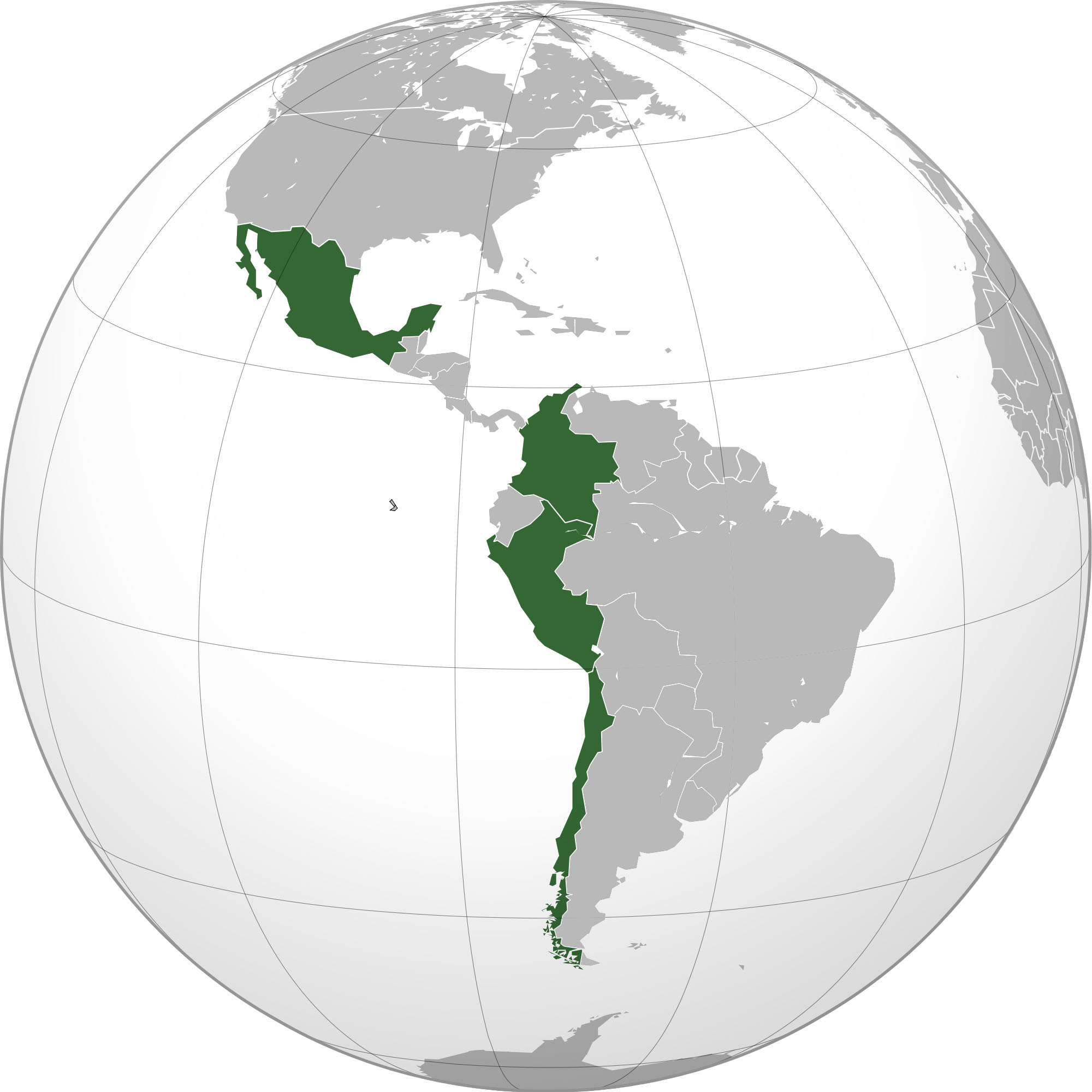
- Dark green: Full members
- Official language: Spanish
- Type: Trade bloc
- Membership: Chile; Colombia; Mexico; Peru

Leaders
  - President pro tempore: (Mexico) Claudia Sheinbaum
- Establishment: 6 June 2012

Area
  - Total: 5,147,441 (Note: Corresponds to the terrestrial surface. Including the exclusive economic zones of each member state, the total area is 13 729 753 km².) km^{2} (1,987,438 sq mi)

Population
  - 2024 estimate: 225 million
  - Density: 45.2/km^{2} (117.1/sq mi)
- GDP (PPP): 2026 estimate
  - Total: ▲$6.292 trillion (7th)
  - Per capita: ▲$26,023
- GDP (nominal): 2026 estimate
  - Total: ▲$3.449 trillion (8th)
  - Per capita: ▲$14,264
- HDI (2023): ▲0.797 high
- Website alianzapacifico.net/en
- 1. Combined census estimates of member states.

The Pacific Alliance (Spanish: Alianza del Pacífico) is a Latin American trade bloc, formed by Chile, Colombia, Mexico and Peru, which all border the Pacific Ocean. The alliance was formed with the express purpose of improving regional integration and moving toward complete freedom in the movement of goods, services, capital and people between the four member states. Together, these four countries have a combined population of more than 230 million people and make up roughly 35 percent of Latin American GDP.

== History ==
A clickable Euler diagram showing the relationships between various multinational organizations in the Americas

The following countries are full members, in the process of becoming full members or observers. On 28 April 2011, then president of Peru Alan García organized a meeting with the presidents of Chile, Colombia and Mexico at the time. This working group issued the Declaración de Lima, a statement of intent to establish the Pacific Alliance. The initial goal of the alliance was to further free trade with "a clear orientation toward Asia" and regional economic integration.

Together, the four member states of the Pacific Alliance represent nearly 35 percent of Latin American GDP. If it were counted as a single country, the Pacific Alliance would have a nominal GDP of US$2.02 trillion (US$4.32 trillion at PPP GDP rates), making it the 9th (or 7th) largest economy in the world. According to the World Trade Organization, the countries of the Pacific Alliance together exported roughly US$680 billion in 2019, almost twice as much as Mercosur, the other predominant Latin American trade bloc. Individually and collectively, the core countries of the Pacific Alliance have been deemed "The Pacific Pumas" by political scientists, for their model of economic and political development.

At the VII Pacific Alliance Summit in Cali, Colombia, on 22 May 2013, Costa Rica signed a trade agreement with Colombia, and later in the summit received approval for full membership from all the founding members. Costa Rica is finishing up the process so it can be readily incorporated as the Alliance's fifth member. At the same summit seven observers were admitted: the Dominican Republic, Ecuador, El Salvador, France, Honduras, Paraguay, Portugal, among others.

== Projects ==
In addition to reducing trade barriers, the Pacific Alliance has begun several other projects for regional integration, including visa-free tourist travel, a common stock exchange, and joint embassies in several countries.

=== Trade liberalization ===
In May 2016, the Pacific Alliance removed 92 percent of tariffs on goods traded between members. Based on a 2013 agreement, the rest of the tariffs will be removed by 2020.

On 26 January 2022, the Pacific Alliance signed its first collective free trade agreement with a nation outside the alliance: Singapore. Singapore had been a candidate for associate member status of the Pacific Alliance since 2017. As of February 2023, ratification of the PASFTA is ongoing.

=== Mercado Integrado Latinoamericano ===
The Mercado Integrado Latinoamericano (MILA) originally integrated the stock markets of Colombia (Colombia Stock Exchange), Chile (Santiago Stock Exchange), and Peru (Lima Stock Exchange), and is seen as a foundation for the Alliance's economic integration. These three stock markets began their integration in November 2010; this made it Latin America's largest market according to number of issuers, the second by market capitalization, and the third by turnover.

The Mexican Stock Exchange began the process of incorporation into MILA and its full incorporation was expected by the year 2014. The Mexican Stock Exchange took the step of acquiring a total of 3.79 million shares of the Lima Stock Exchange (BVL), equivalent to 6.7 percent of the shares of Series A of that market. This is part of an agreement for a strategic partnership in order to develop joint business activities and development of the stock markets of Peru and Mexico, and eventually complete integration into MILA.

The Mexican Stock Exchange met the timeframe and announced the first trade made as part of MILA on 2 December 2014. The trade on MIILA was a $1,415 purchase of 200 shares in Chilean retailer Falabella, executed by GBM Mexico through GBM Chile. With the entry of Mexico into MILA, the integrated stock market now counts 780 issuers among the four countries, making it the biggest market by number of listed companies in Latin America, and the biggest in terms of market capitalization, according to the World Federation of Exchanges. The joint capitalization of the four bourses tops US$1.25 trillion, making it larger than the US$1.22 trillion BM&F Bovespa.

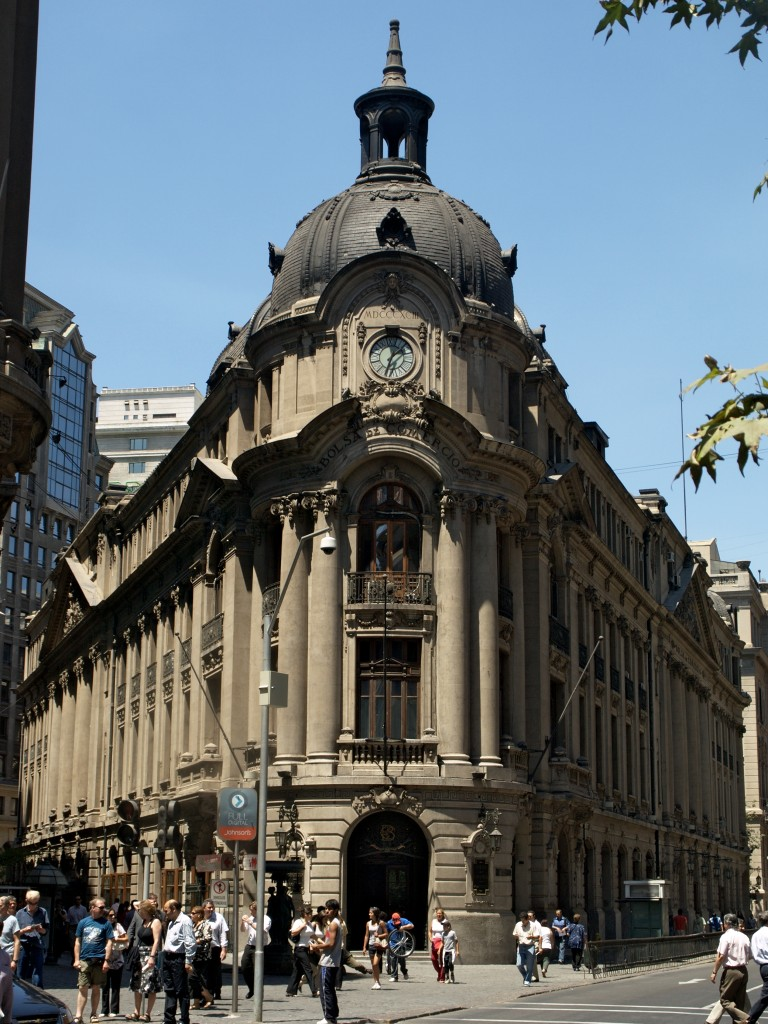
Santiago Stock Exchange, Chile

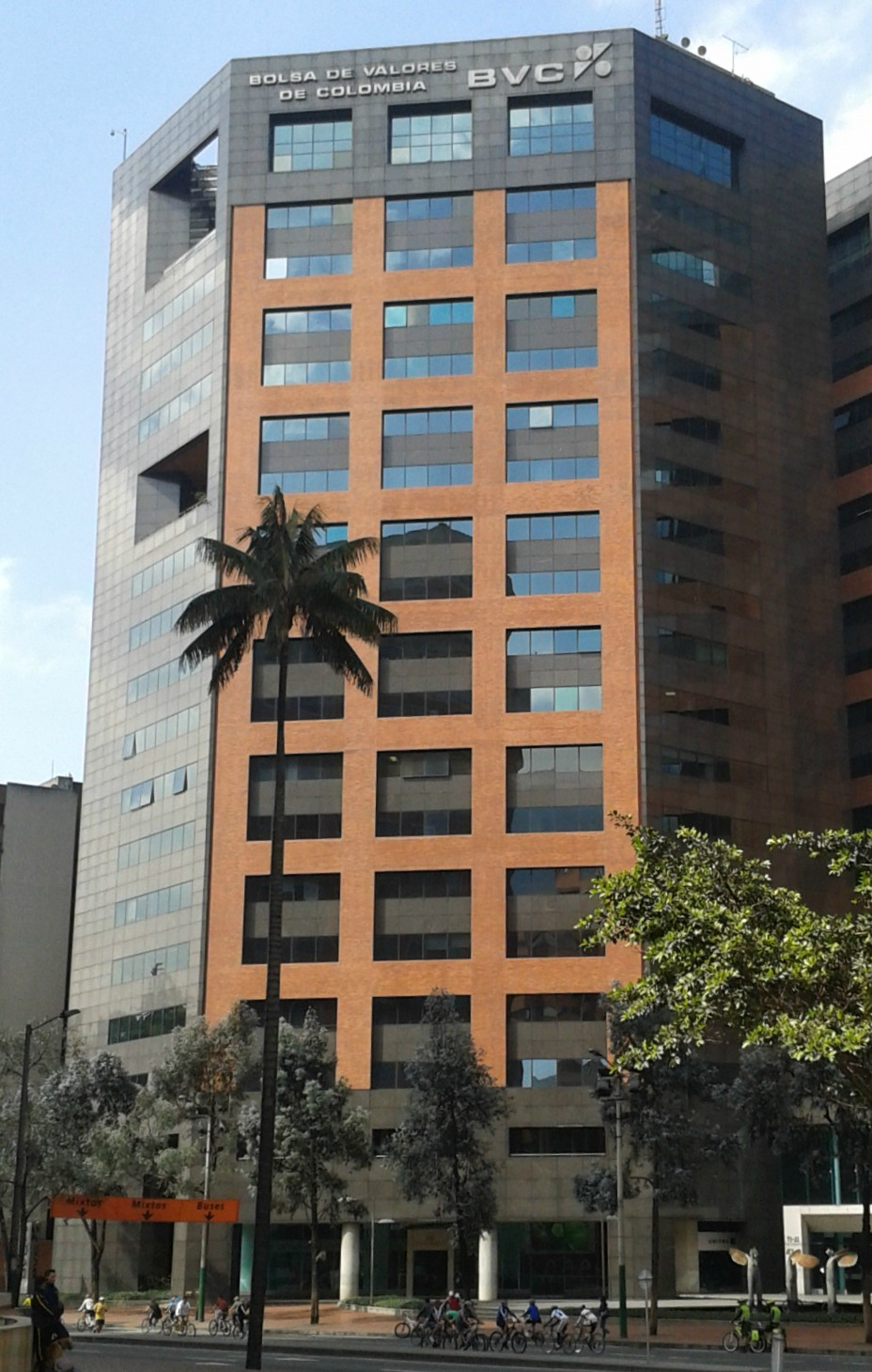
Colombia Stock Exchange

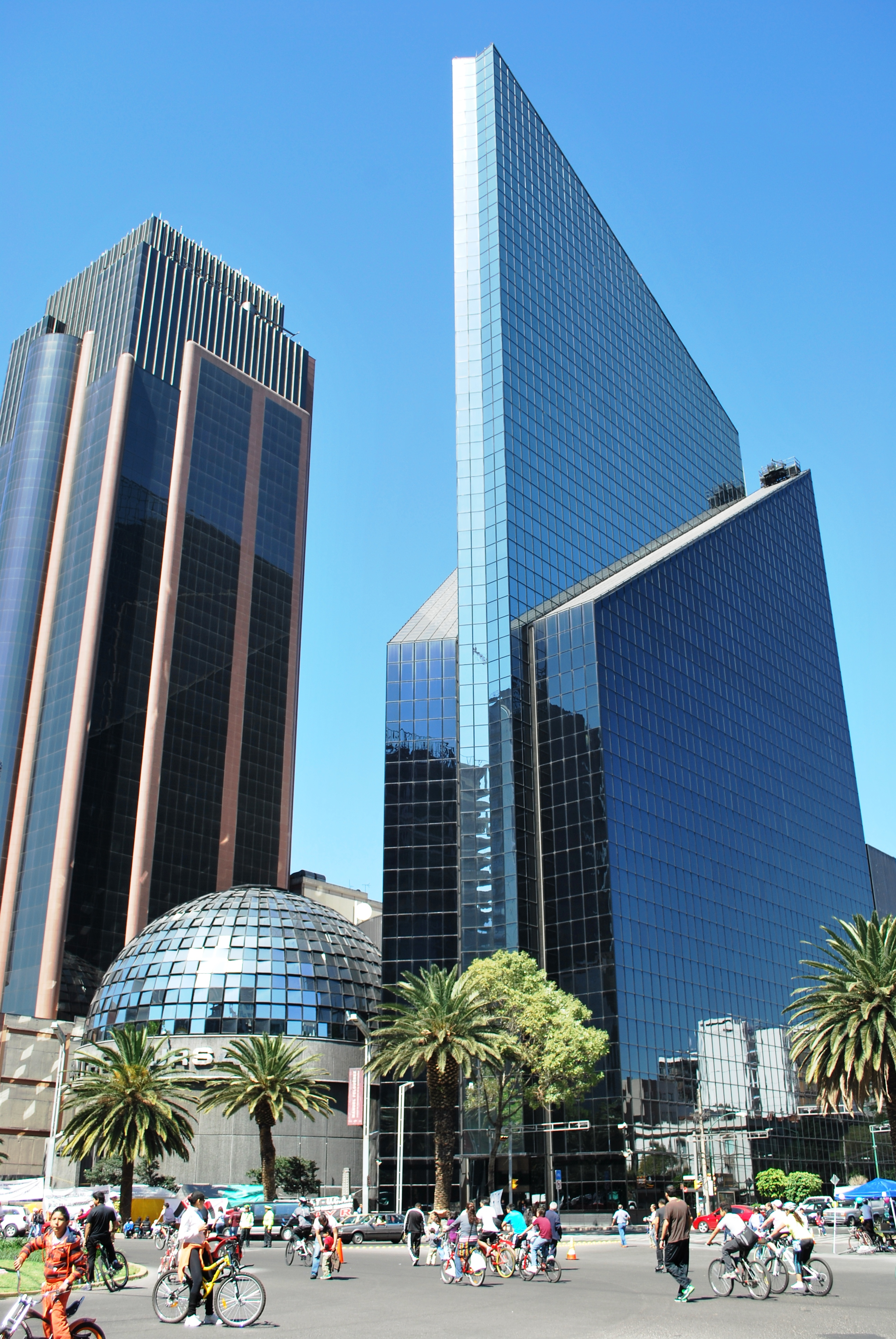
(Mexico) Mexican Stock Exchange

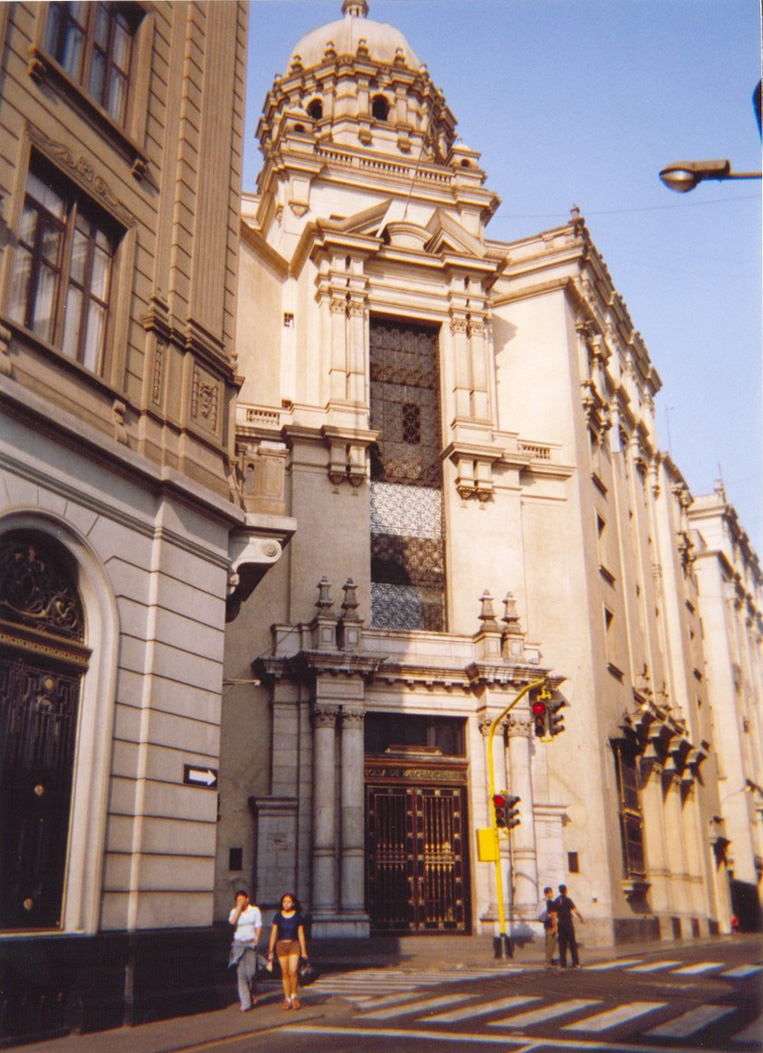
Lima Stock Exchange, Peru

=== Joint diplomatic missions ===
Among the more important agreements that have been reached is the creation of joint diplomatic missions (embassies, consulates, etc.) that will provide citizens of Pacific Alliance member states with needed diplomatic services. The Declaration of Cali highlights the importance of the opening of an embassy shared between Chile, Colombia, Mexico and Peru in Ghana, as well as the agreement between Chile and Colombia to share embassies in Algeria and Morocco and between Colombia and Peru to share an embassy in Vietnam. The Declaration of Cali encourages these countries to move forward on these initiatives. In November 2014, Mexico opened its first trade office in Africa; located in Casablanca and shared with the other Pacific Alliance members.

== Expansion ==
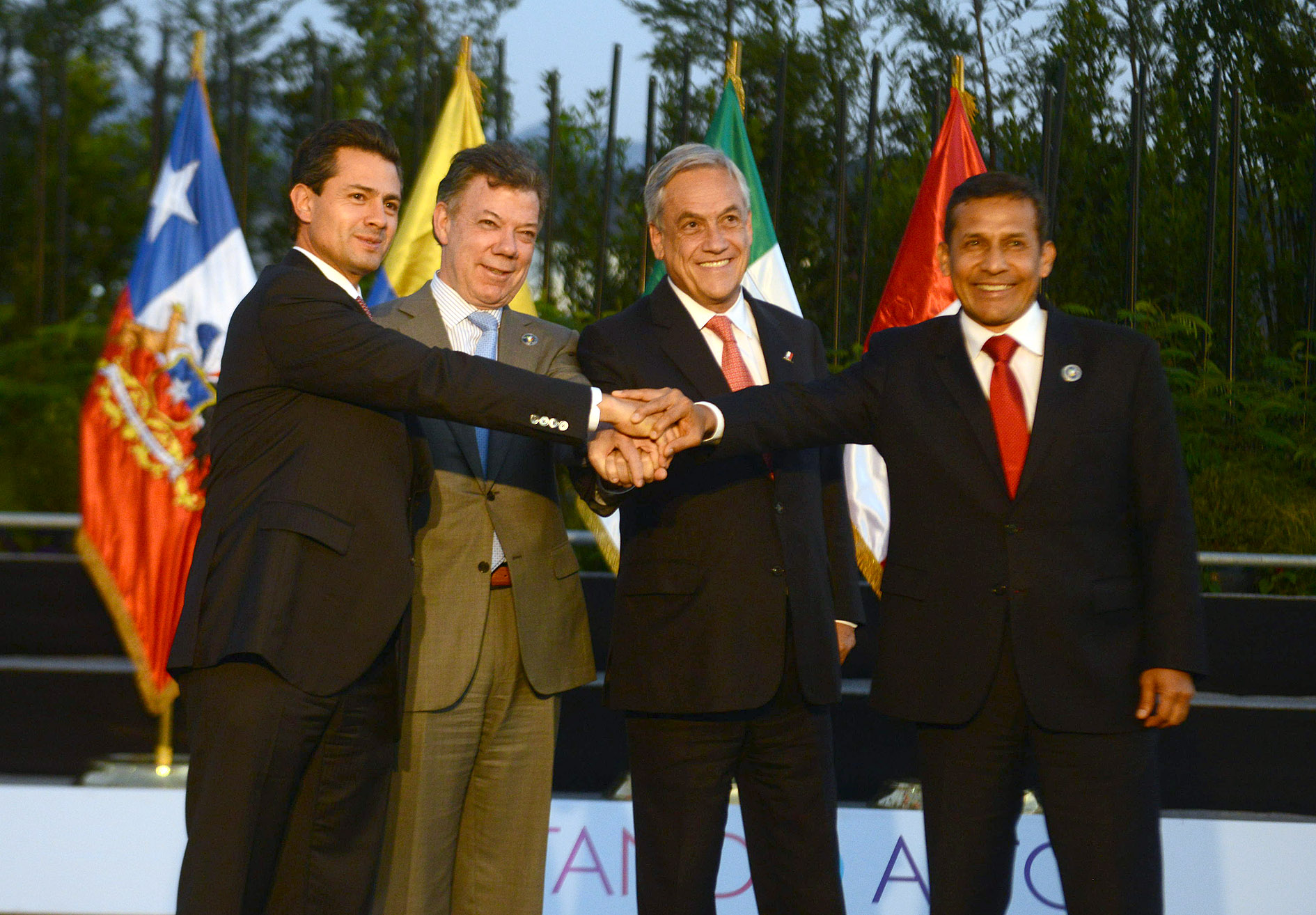
VI Summit of the Pacific Alliance, Santiago de Chile.

As of July 2018, there are 55 observer states of which two are candidate countries, in process of full membership, which are the Central-American countries of Costa Rica and Panama.

Canada has also been mentioned as a candidate to join the alliance, and called a "natural fit" by Mexico's vice-minister of foreign affairs, Sergio Alcocer. It has free-trade agreements with the four founding members, and has been encouraged by regional leaders to join the alliance. However the Canadian government has yet to upgrade its observer status to observer-candidate as it is still determining whether or not to become a member.

Costa Rica began the process of joining on 10 February 2014 at the eighth summit of the Alliance in Cartagena de Indias, Colombia, when President Laura Chinchilla signed a protocol at a plenary session finalizing the decision to join the alliance. The country had since postponed its incorporation into the alliance indefinitely, pending consultations by its presidential economic council. However, on 8 July 2022, President Rodrigo Chaves Robles announced that Costa Rica had applied to become a full member of the Alliance.

Ecuador has been critical of the alliance in conjunction with other leaders of ALBA, but its president, Rafael Correa, has also speculated on a possible future bid if integration advances in areas other than trade.

Guatemala has expressed concrete interest in joining the Pacific Alliance and is pursuing trade deals with current members as a precursor to a possible membership application.

Panama has expressed interest in joining the Alliance, and is an official observer-candidate according to the website. Panama has already signed trade deals with Colombia, Peru and Chile, and reached an agreement with Mexico to sign a free-trade deal in March 2014. While fulfilling most of the criteria to enter in the alliance, the country has so far refused to commit itself to full membership.

Paraguay, a founding member of Mercosur and observer of the Pacific Alliance, has begun pursuing free-trade deals with current members as a precursor to a possible membership application. Paraguay was suspended from Mercosur following the impeachment of Fernando Lugo, although Paraguay asked Mercosur to lift the sanction. After the election and inauguration of Horacio Cartes, Paraguay has so far claimed "Paraguay would not abandon Mercosur", but assured it will seek to join the alliance. The government has said it is reportedly considering joining the Pacific Alliance in addition to rejoining Mercosur.

U.S. Vice President Joe Biden expressed that the United States was willing to join the Pacific Alliance as an observer on 23 May 2013, in Bogotá, Colombia, during a bilateral meeting with Colombian President Juan Manuel Santos.

Argentine President Mauricio Macri, during his campaign and in press conferences after the election, has expressed his desire to bring his country closer to the Pacific Alliance and also work on integration between the bloc and his country's trade bloc Mercosur.

Uruguay has been encouraged to join the alliance by existing members Peru and Colombia, and is reportedly considering the possibility of accession.

Honduras officially applied for formal membership in October 2016, with the vocal support of Chile.

== List of Summits ==
No.	Date	Host country	Host figure	Location held	Notes
I	28 April 2011	Peru	President Alan García Pérez	Lima, Peru	
II	4 December 2011	Mexico	President Felipe Calderón Hinojosa	Mérida, Mexico	
III	5 March 2012	None			First virtual presidential summit.
IV	6 June 2012	Chile	President Sebastián Piñera Echenique	Antofagasta, Chile	
V	17 November 2012	Spain	None	Cádiz, Spain	The summit held after the XXII Iberoamerican Summit.
VI	27 January 2013	Chile	President Sebastián Piñera Echenique	Santiago, Chile	
VII	20–23 May 2013	Colombia	President Juan Manuel Santos	Cali, Colombia	
VIII	8–10 February 2014	Colombia	President Juan Manuel Santos	Cartagena, Colombia	
IX	19–20 June 2014	Mexico	President Enrique Peña Nieto	Nayarit, Mexico	
X	1–3 July 2015	Peru	President Ollanta Humala	Paracas, Peru	
XI	1 July 2016	Chile	President Michelle Bachelet	Puerto Varas, Chile	
XII	29–30 June 2017	Colombia	President Juan Manuel Santos	Cali, Colombia	
XIII	24–25 July 2018	Mexico	President Enrique Peña Nieto,	Puerto Vallarta, Mexico	
XIV	5–6 July 2019	Peru	President Martín Vizcarra	Lima, Peru	President Lopez Obrador of Mexico didn't participate in the summit.
XV	11 December 2020	Chile	President Sebastián Piñera	No host city	The summit was held virtually due to the COVID-19 pandemic
XVI	26 January 2022	Colombia	President Iván Duque	Bahía Málaga, Colombia	
XVII	TBA 2023	Peru	President Dina Boluarte	TBA	Originally supposed to be held in Mexico City, Mexico, on 25 November 2022 and to be hosted by President Andrés Manuel López Obrador. Because of the unavailability of then-President of Peru Pedro Castillo to leave the country for Mexico, it was first announced that the summit would take place in Lima, Peru on 14 December 2022. However, due to the Peruvian political crisis caused by the 2022 Peruvian self-coup attempt along with its subsequent protests, the summit was suspended until 2023.

== Members ==
Exclusive economic zones of the member states of the Pacific Alliance. Considering them, the total area reaches the 13 729 753 km^{2}.

=== Full members ===
- Chile
- Colombia
- Mexico
- Peru

=== Associated state ===
- Singapore

=== Candidate Associate members ===
- Australia
- Canada
- Costa Rica (in the process of becoming a full member)
- Ecuador
- El Salvador
- Guatemala
- New Zealand
- Panama
- United States

=== Observers ===
- Argentina
- Armenia
- Australia
- Austria
- Azerbaijan
- Belarus
- Belgium
- Canada
- China
- Costa Rica
- Croatia
- Czech Republic
- Denmark
- Dominican Republic
- Ecuador
- Egypt
- El Salvador
- Finland
- France
- Georgia
- Germany
- Greece
- Guatemala
- Haiti
- Honduras
- Hungary
- India
- Indonesia
- Ireland
- Israel
- Italy
- Japan
- Kazakhstan
- Latvia
- Lithuania
- Malta
- Morocco
- Netherlands
- New Zealand
- Norway
- Pakistan
- Panama
- Paraguay
- Philippines
- Poland
- Portugal
- Romania
- Saudi Arabia
- Serbia
- Slovakia
- Slovenia
- South Korea
- Spain
- Sweden
- Switzerland
- Thailand
- Trinidad and Tobago
- Turkey
- Ukraine
- United Arab Emirates
- United Kingdom
- United States
- Uruguay

== President ==
The pro tempore president of the Pacific Alliance is the highest representative at international events and conveys the statements and jointly agreed positions of the international organization. The current officeholder is Claudia Sheinbaum, president of Mexico.

The office of pro tempore president is exercised successively by the representative of each member state in alphabetical order for a one-year term. Therefore, the logical order of succession is: Chile, Colombia, Mexico, and Peru.

=== History of the presidency ===
The first pro tempore president of the Alliance was the president of Chile, Sebastián Piñera, who assumed office on 5 March 2012.

In 2018, Mexico was undergoing a presidential transition, so it was replaced by Peru to hold the pro tempore presidency that year, according to the logical order of the countries.

In January 2023, due to the political crisis in Peru, Mexican president Andrés Manuel López Obrador decided not to hand over the pro tempore presidency to Peruvian president Dina Boluarte, despite the logical order of the countries indicating that Peru should assume it. This was because López Obrador did not recognize Boluarte's government. In June of that year, Mexico transferred the pro tempore presidency to Chile, which in August finally granted it to Peru, a transfer diplomatically agreed upon among the four member countries.

==== List of pro tempore presidents ====
No.	President	Country	Party (Alliance)	Start of term	End of term
1st	Sebastián Piñera	Chile	Independent (Coalition for Change)	5 March 2012	22 May 2013
2nd	Juan Manuel Santos	Colombia	Social Party of National Unity (National Unity)	23 May 2013	20 June 2014
3rd	Enrique Peña Nieto	Mexico	Institutional Revolutionary Party	20 June 2014	3 July 2015
4th	Ollanta Humala	Peru	Peruvian Nationalist Party (Peru Wins)	3 July 2015	1 July 2016
5th	Michelle Bachelet	Chile	Socialist Party of Chile (Nueva Mayoría)	1 July 2016	30 June 2017
6th	Juan Manuel Santos	Colombia	Social Party of National Unity (National Unity)	30 June 2017	24 July 2018
7th	Martín Vizcarra	Peru	Independent	24 July 2018	6 July 2019
8th	Sebastián Piñera	Chile	Independent (Chile Vamos)	6 July 2019	11 December 2020
9th	Iván Duque	Colombia	Democratic Centre Party (Great Alliance for Colombia)	11 December 2020	26 January 2022
10th	Andrés Manuel López Obrador	Mexico	National Regeneration Movement (Juntos Hacemos Historia)	26 January 2022	28 June 2023
11th	Gabriel Boric	Chile	Social Convergence (Unity for Chile)	28 June 2023	1 August 2023
12th	Dina Boluarte	Peru	Independent	1 August 2023	22 March 2024
13th	Gabriel Boric	Chile	Social Convergence (Unity for Chile)	22 March 2024	13 December 2024
14th	Gustavo Petro	Colombia	Colombia Humana (Historic Pact Coalition)	13 December 2024	30 January 2026
15th	Claudia Sheinbaum	Mexico	National Regeneration Movement (Let's Keep Making History Coalition)	30 January 2026	Incumbent

== See also ==
- Bolivarian Alliance for the Americas
- Forum of East Asia–Latin America Cooperation
- Free-trade area
- Market access
- Mercosur
- Rules of Origin
- Tariffs
- The Pacific Pumas
- Trans-Pacific Partnership
- Trans-Pacific Strategic Economic Partnership Agreement
