= Mercado Integrado Latinoamericano =

Program to integrate the stock exchange markets of Chile, Colombia and Peru

MILA
- Mercado Integrado Latinoamericano
- Type: Stock exchange
- Location: Santiago, Chile; Bogotá, Colombia; Mexico City, Mexico; Lima, Peru,
- Founded: 2010; 16 years ago
- Currency: Chilean peso, Colombian peso, Mexican peso, Peruvian sol
- No. of listings: 712
- Market cap: USD 836.271 billion (April 2016)
- Volume: USD 174.052 billion (Jan-Dec 2015)
- Indices: COLCAP (Colombia); IGBVL (Lima); IPC (Mexico); IPSA (Santiago)
- Website: mercadomila.com

The Mercado Integrado Latinoamericano, more commonly known as MILA, is a program that integrates the stock exchange markets of Chile, Colombia, Mexico, and Peru. The three founding members are the Lima Stock Exchange, the Santiago Stock Exchange, and the Colombia Stock Exchange. The integration aims to develop the capital market through the integration of the four countries, to give investors a greater supply of securities, issuers and also larger sources of funding.

MILA is largely a part of economic integration efforts among the Pacific Alliance member countries of Chile, Colombia, Mexico, and Peru. With the successful integration of the Mexican Stock Exchange with the Chilean, Colombian, and Peruvian bourses MILA has become Latin America's largest stock exchange.

Investors are able to access MILA through one of the registered brokers that have access to the common trading platform for buying and selling stocks in any of the three countries. In the same way, the companies participating in MILA have increased availability to capital by means of new investors.

== History ==
In September 2009, an agreement was signed by the Colombia, Chile, and Peru Exchanges, to create a unique market, with the objective to unite the equity trading platforms and in this way concentrate a bigger number of issuers, investors, and intermediaries.

The formal ceremony was held in the location of BVL in Lima. The MILA started officially operations on May 30, 2011 as the second biggest market of Latin America in market capitalization with US$720 billion, and the third largest market in trading volume in the region with US$87,000 million a year.

The Mexican Stock Exchange, BMV, announced its first trade made as part of MILA on 2 December 2014. The trade on MIILA was a $1,415 purchase of 200 shares in Chilean retailer Falabella, executed by GBM Mexico through GBM Chile. With the entry of Mexico into MILA, the integrated stock market now counts 798 issuers among the four countries, making it the biggest market by number of listed companies in Latin America, and the biggest in terms of market capitalization, according to the World Federation of Exchanges. The joint capitalization of the four bourses tops US$1.25 trillion, making it larger than the US$1.22 trillion BM&F Bovespa.

== See also ==
- The Pacific Pumas
