= How Asia Got Rich =

2002 book by Edith Terry

How Asia Got Rich: Japan, China and the Asian Miracle is a 2002 non-fiction book by Edith Terry, published by M.E. Sharpe.

The book argues that Japan was the main impetus for the development of East and Southeast Asia in the 20th century.

== Background ==
The book took about ten years to develop. Edith Terry had a background as a journalist.

== Contents ==
The development of the philosophy of Japanese economics is the topic of the initial chapters.

Edith Terry did not do original research in her economic analysis, and chose to use existing economic theory models instead of trying to make her own.

Terry included background information on people that John E. Butler (Chinese name: 畢約翰) of Hong Kong Polytechnic University characterized as ""trivial""; Butler theorized that this was so "Perhaps because of her journalist background".

== Reception ==
Butler praised the book, stating that the "extremely well-written" book did not have redundant content and that it did not have a "ponderous academic tone" because of Terry's career background's influence in writing the book. According to Butler, the economic information "is often based on rigorous research" and that the references used for it are "credible" even though some of it is "anecdotal".

Morgen Witzel of the University of Exeter wrote that How Asia Got Rich "is well worth having in any business library", citing "detailed and readable" information. Witzel did not agree with several statements that the book argued for, and argued that the book should have placed more emphasis on what China could do in subsequent years. Witzel believed that there would be people disagreeing with Japan's prominence in the economies of East and Southeast Asia by the 1990s. Witzel added that the "real meat" of How Asia Got Rich was in the book's concluding chapter and other ending chapters.
