= Four Asian Tigers =

Economies of South Korea, Taiwan, Singapore and Hong Kong

- The Four Asian Tigers, from north to south: South Korea, Taiwan, Hong Kong and Singapore

Chinese name
- Traditional Chinese: 亞洲四小龍
- Simplified Chinese: 亚洲四小龙
- Literal meaning: Asia's Four Little Dragons
Transcriptions
Standard Mandarin
- Hanyu Pinyin: Yàzhōu sì xiǎo lóng
- Bopomofo: ㄧㄚˋ ㄓㄡ ㄙˋ ㄒㄧㄠˇ ㄌㄨㄥˊ
- Wade–Giles: Ya^{4}-chou^{1} szu^{4} hsiao^{3} lung^{2}
- Tongyong Pinyin: Yàjhōu sìh siǎo lóng
- Yale Romanization: Yàzhōu sz̀ syǎu lúng
- IPA: [jâ.ʈʂóʊ sɹ̩̂ ɕjàʊ lʊ̌ŋ]
Yue: Cantonese
- Yale Romanization: aa jāu sei síu lùhng
- Jyutping: aa3 zau1 sei3 siu2 lung4
- IPA: [a˧ tsɐw˥ sej˧ siw˧˥ lʊŋ˩]
Southern Min
- Hokkien POJ: A-chiu sì sió lêng

Korean name
- Hangul: 아시아의 네 마리 용
- Hanja: 아시아의 네 마리 龍
- Literal meaning: Asia's four dragons
Transcriptions
- Revised Romanization: Asiaui ne mari yong
- McCune–Reischauer: Asiaŭi ne mari yong

Malay name
- Malay: Empat Harimau Asia

The Four Asian Tigers (a.k.a. the Four Asian Dragons or Four Little Dragons in Korean and Chinese) are the developed Asian economies of Hong Kong, Singapore, South Korea, and Taiwan. Between the early 1950s and 1990s, they underwent rapid industrialisation and maintained exceptionally high growth rates of more than 7 percent a year.

By the middle 1990s, all of these economies had developed into high-income economies, specialising in areas of competitive advantage. Hong Kong and Singapore have become leading international financial centres, whereas South Korea and Taiwan are leaders in manufacturing electronic components and devices; Taiwan now produces the most advanced semiconductor chips in the world; South Korea has also developed into a major global arms manufacturer. Large institutions have pushed to have them serve as role models for many developing countries, especially the Tiger Cub Economies of Southeast Asia.

In 1993, a World Bank report The East Asian Miracle credited neoliberal policies with the economic boom, including the maintenance of export-oriented policies, low taxes and minimal welfare states. Other institutional and empirical analyses have argued that extensive state intervention and industrial policy had a much greater influence than the World Bank suggested.

== Overview ==
Growth in per capita GDP in the tiger economies between 1960 and 2019

Prior to the 1997 Asian financial crisis, the growth of the Four Asian Tiger economies (commonly referred to as "the Asian Miracle") has been attributed to export oriented policies and strong development policies. Unique to these economies were the sustained rapid growth and high levels of equal income distribution. A World Bank report suggests two development policies among others as sources for the Asian miracle: factor accumulation and macroeconomic management. A paper in The American Journal of Economics and Sociology attributes the Four Tigers' success to multiple factors:

1. A transition from import substitution industrialisation (ISI) to export-oriented industrialisation (EOI);
2. Heavy state intervention within a market-oriented economy, including state investment in agriculture and industry, land reform, and education, and policies to encourage a high rate of private investment;
3. US support through free-trade policies, public policy consultation, and military backing.

Other sources have noted that all of the Four Asian Tigers practiced authoritarianism during the peak of their economic growth, although they have since moved to hybrid or liberal democratic regimes.

The Hong Kong economy was the first out of the four to undergo industrialisation with the development of a textile industry in the 1950s. By the 1960s, manufacturing in the British colony had expanded and diversified to include clothing, electronics, and plastics for export orientation. Following Singapore's independence from Malaysia, the Economic Development Board formulated and implemented national economic strategies to promote the country's manufacturing sector. Industrial estates were set up and foreign investment was attracted to the country with tax incentives. Meanwhile, Taiwan and South Korea began to industrialise in the mid-1960s with heavy government involvement including initiatives and policies. Both countries pursued export-oriented industrialisation as in Hong Kong and Singapore. The four countries were inspired by the Japanese economic miracle, and they collectively pursued the same goal by investing in the same categories: infrastructure and education. They also benefited from foreign trade advantages that set them apart from other countries, most significantly economic support from the United States, including Free Development aid; part of this is manifested in the proliferation of American electronic products in common households of the Four Tigers. By the end of the 1960s, levels in physical and human capital in the four economies far exceeded other countries at similar levels of development. This subsequently led to a rapid growth in per capita income levels. While high investments were essential to their economic growth, the role of human capital was also important. Education in particular is cited as playing a major role in the Asian economic miracle. The levels of education enrolment in the Four Asian Tigers were higher than predicted given their level of income. By 1965, all four nations had achieved universal primary education. South Korea in particular had achieved a secondary education enrolment rate of 88% by 1987. There was also a notable decrease in the gap between male and female enrolments during the Asian miracle. Overall these advances in education allowed for high levels of literacy and cognitive skills.

The creation of stable macroeconomic environments was the foundation upon which the Asian miracle was built. Each of the Four Asian Tiger states managed, to various degrees of success, three variables in: budget deficits, external debt and exchange rates. Each Tiger nation's budget deficits were kept within the limits of their financial limits, as to not destabilise the macro-economy. South Korea in particular had deficits lower than the OECD average in the 1980s. External debt was non-existent for Hong Kong, Singapore and Taiwan, as they did not borrow from abroad. Although South Korea was the exception to this – its debt to GNP ratio was quite high during the period 1980–1985, it was sustained by the country's high level of exports. Exchange rates in the Four Asian Tiger nations had been changed from long-term fixed rate regimes to fixed-but-adjustable rate regimes with the occasional steep devaluation of managed floating rate regimes. This active exchange rate management allowed the Four Tiger economies to avoid exchange rate appreciation and maintain a stable real exchange rate.

Export policies have been the de facto reason for the rise of these Four Asian Tiger economies. The approach taken has been different among the four nations. Hong Kong, and Singapore introduced trade regimes that were neoliberal in nature and encouraged free trade, while South Korea and Taiwan adopted mixed regimes that accommodated their own export industries. In Hong Kong and Singapore, due to small domestic markets, domestic prices were linked to international prices. South Korea and Taiwan introduced export incentives for the traded-goods sector. The governments of Singapore, South Korea and Taiwan also worked to promote specific exporting industries, which were termed as an export push strategy. All these policies helped these four nations to achieve a growth averaging 7.5% each year for three decades and as such they achieved developed country status.

Dani Rodrik, economist at the John F. Kennedy School of Government at Harvard University, has in a number of studies argued that state intervention was important in the East Asian growth miracle. He has argued "it is impossible to understand the East Asian growth miracle without appreciating the important role that government policy played in stimulating private investment".

=== 1997 Asian financial crisis ===
The Tiger economies experienced a setback in the 1997 Asian financial crisis. Hong Kong came under intense speculative attacks against its stock market and currency necessitating unprecedented market interventions by the state Hong Kong Monetary Authority. South Korea was hit the hardest as its foreign debt burdens swelled resulting in its currency falling between 35 and 50%. By the beginning of 1997, the stock market in Hong Kong, Singapore, and South Korea also saw losses of at least 60% in dollar terms. Singapore and Taiwan were relatively unscathed. The Four Asian Tigers recovered from the 1997 crisis faster than other countries due to various economic advantages including their high savings rate (except South Korea) and their openness to trade.

=== 2008 financial crisis ===
The export-oriented tiger economies, which benefited from global consumption, were hit hard by the 2008 financial crisis. By the fourth quarter of 2008, the GDP of all four nations fell by an average annualised rate of around 15%. Exports also fell by a 50% annualised rate. Weak domestic demand also affected the recovery of these economies. In 2008, retail sales fell 3% in Hong Kong, 6% in Singapore and 11% in Taiwan.

As the world recovered from the crisis, the Four Asian Tiger economies have also rebounded strongly. This is due in no small part to each country's government fiscal stimulus measures. These fiscal packages accounted for more than 4% of each country's GDP in 2009. Another reason for the strong bounce back is the modest corporate and household debt in these four nations.

A 2011 article published in Applied Economics Letters by financial economist Mete Feridun of University of Greenwich Business School and his international colleagues investigates the causal relationship between financial development and economic growth for Thailand, Indonesia, Malaysia, the Philippines, China, India and Singapore for the period between 1979 and 2009, using Johansen cointegration tests and vector error correction models. The results suggest that in the case of Indonesia, Singapore, the Philippines, China and India financial development leads to economic growth, whereas in the case of Thailand there exists a bidirectional causality between these variables. The results further suggest that in the case of Malaysia, financial development does not seem to cause economic growth.

== Gross domestic product (GDP) ==
In 2018, the combined economy of the Four Asian Tigers constituted 3.46% of the world's economy with a total Gross domestic product (GDP) of 2,932 billion US dollars. The GDP in Hong Kong, Singapore, South Korea and Taiwan was worth 363.03 billion, 361.1 billion, 1,619.42 billion and 589.39 billion US dollars respectively in 2018, which represented 0.428%, 0.426%, 1.911% and 0.696% of the world economy. Together, their combined economy surpassed the United Kingdom's GDP of 3.34% of the world's economy some time in the mid-2010s. In 2021, each of the Four Asian Tigers' GDP Per capita (nominal) exceeds $30,000 according to IMF's estimate.

Maddison GDP per capita of the Four Asian Tigers View chart definition.
Skylines of the Four Tigers

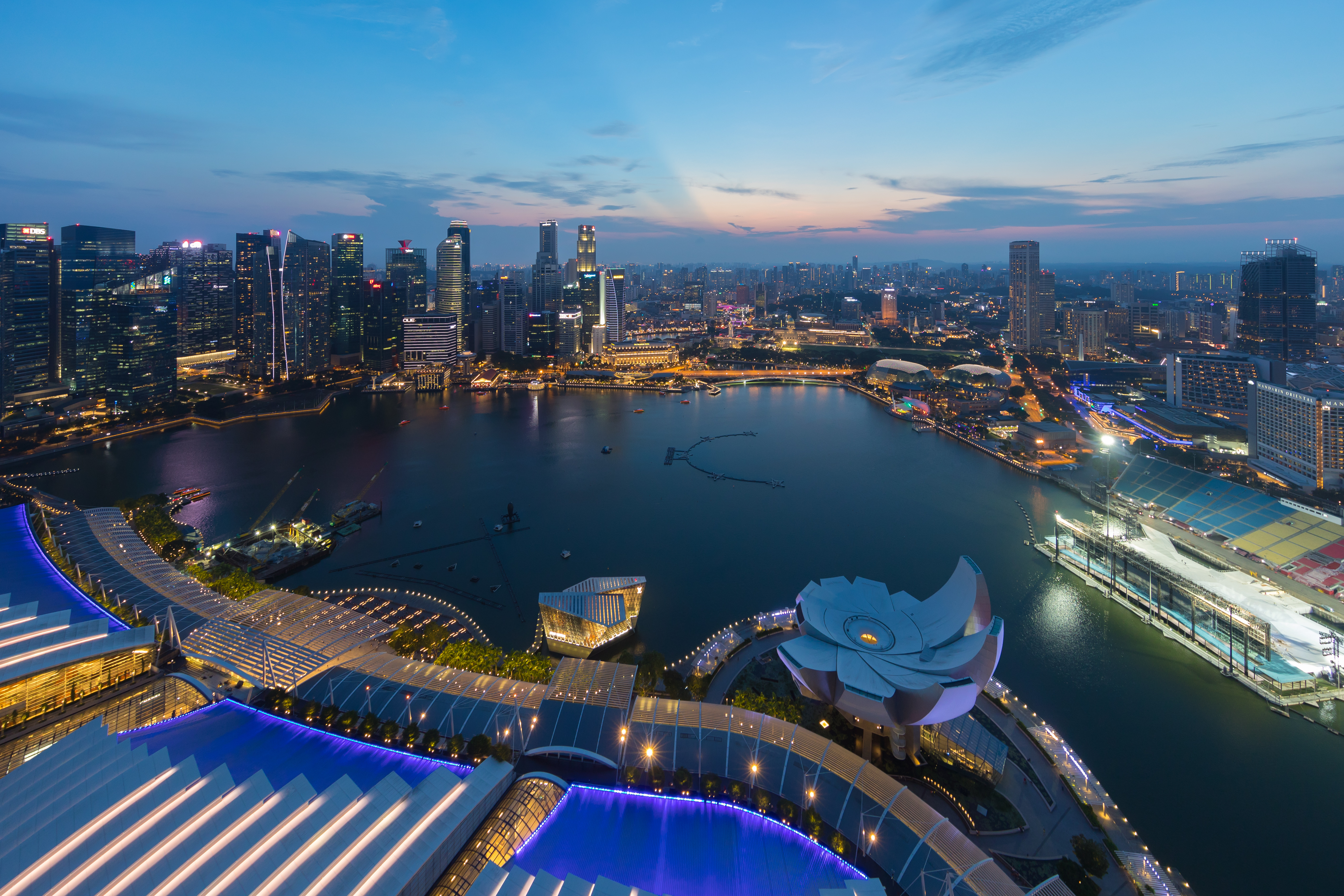
Singapore

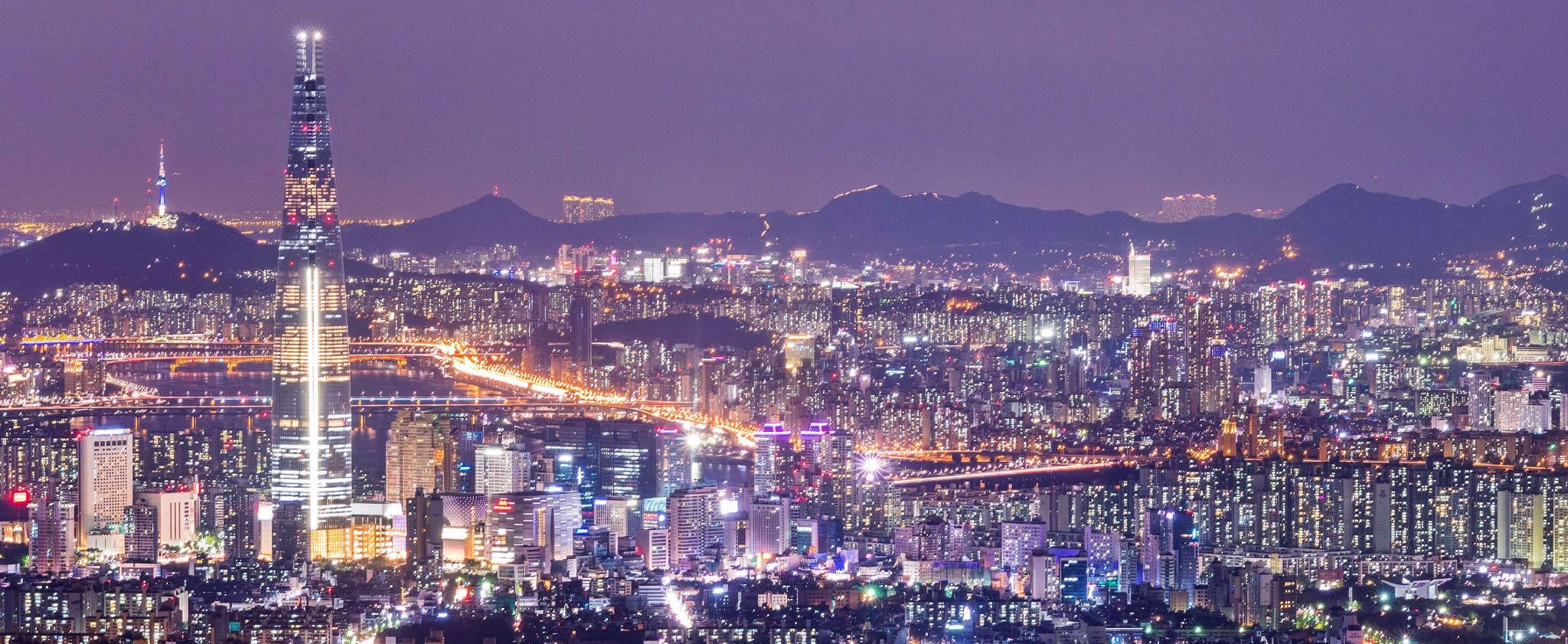
Seoul, South Korea
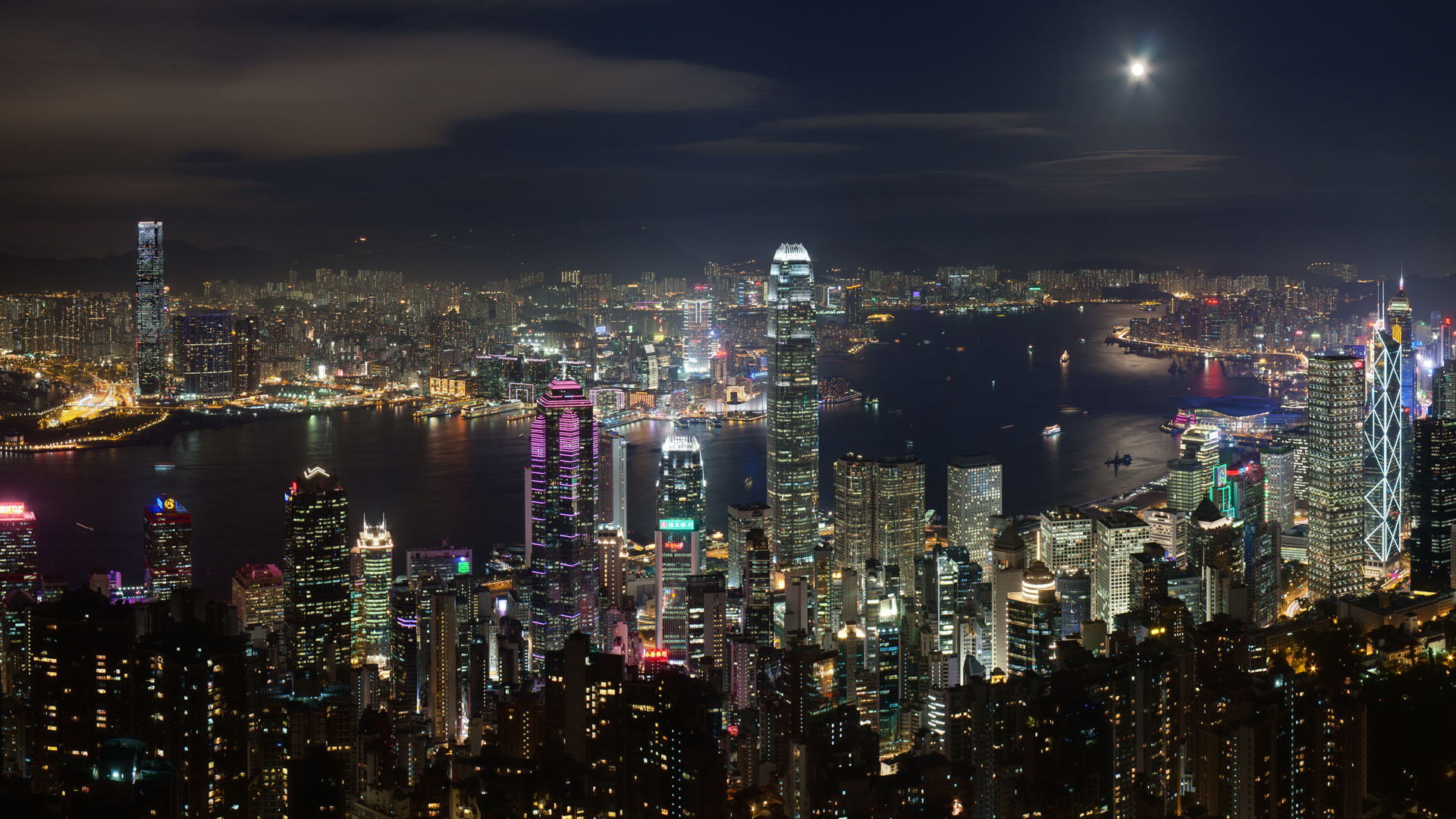
Hong Kong

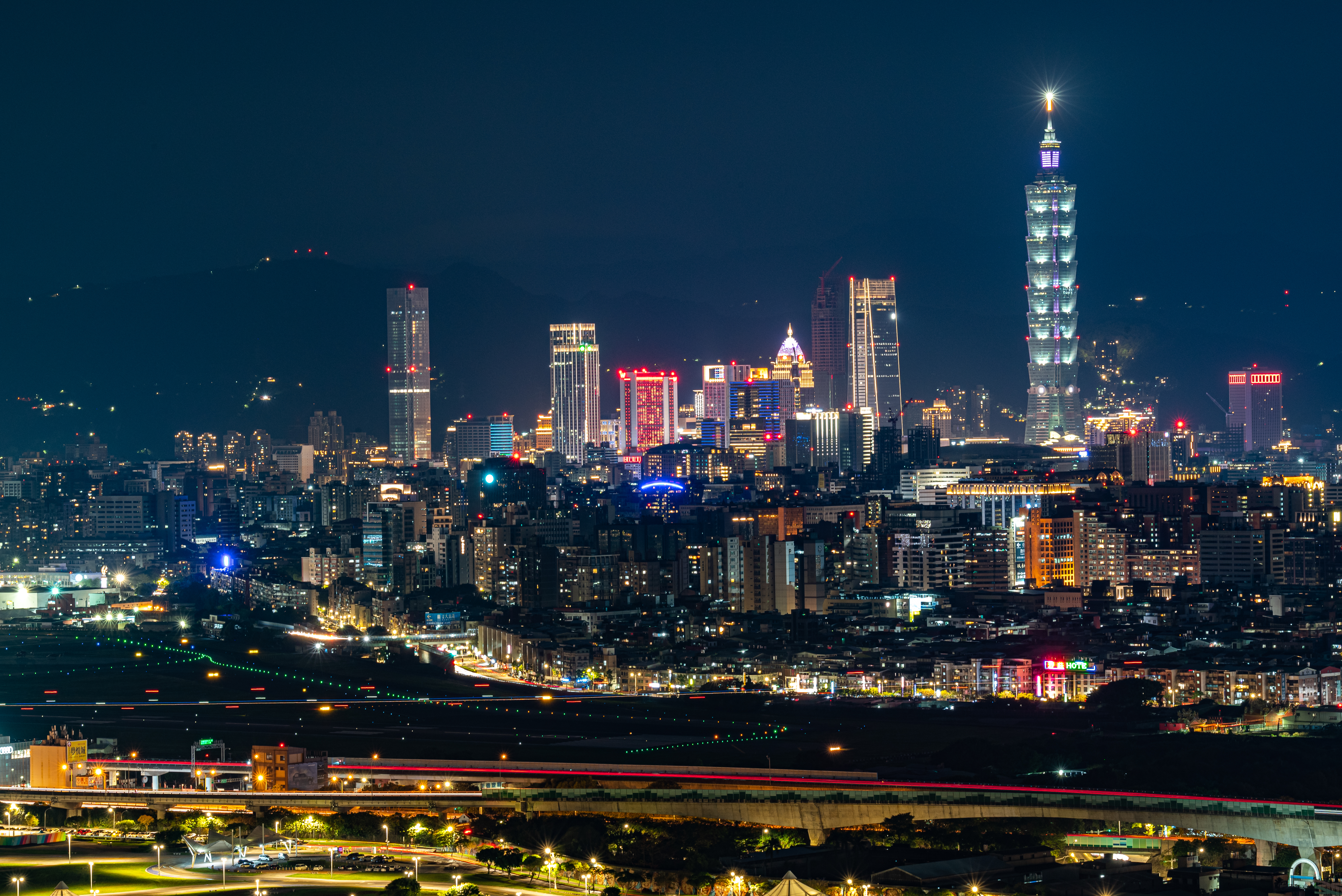
Taipei, Taiwan

== Education and technology ==
The four governments focused on investing heavily in their infrastructure as well as education to benefit their country through skilled workers and higher level jobs such as engineers and doctors. The policy was generally successful and helped develop the countries into more advanced and high-income industrialised developed countries. For example, all four have become global education centres with high school students scoring well on maths and science exams such as the PISA exam and with Taiwanese students winning several medals in International Olympiads.

In relation to higher-level education, there are many prestigious colleges as in most developed countries. In the 2023 QS University Rankings, the top 100 universities in the world include 5 universities from Hong Kong, 6 universities from South Korea, 2 from Singapore and 1 from Taiwan. Despite the small populations and the relatively short history of universities in the four countries, they together account for a quarter of the top 100 universities located outside of the United States or the United Kingdom. Notable schools include the National Taiwan University, Chinese University of Hong Kong, The Hong Kong University of Science and Technology, Seoul National University, National University of Singapore, Nanyang Technological University and University of Hong Kong. The cities of Hong Kong, Singapore and Seoul are prominent hubs in higher education.

== Cultural basis ==
The role of Confucianism has been used to explain the success of the Four Asian Tigers. This conclusion is similar to the Protestant work ethic theory in the West promoted by German sociologist Max Weber in his book The Protestant Ethic and the Spirit of Capitalism. The culture of Confucianism is said to have been compatible with industrialization because it valued stability, hard work, discipline, and loyalty and respect towards authority figures. There is a significant influence of Confucianism on the corporate and political institutions of the Asian Tigers. Prime Minister of Singapore Lee Kuan Yew advocated Asian values as an alternative to the influence of Western culture in Asia. This theory was not without its critics. There was a lack of mainland Chinese economic success during the same time frame as the Four Tigers, despite China being the birthplace of Confucianism. During the May Fourth Movement of 1919, Confucianism was blamed for China's inability to compete with Western powers.

In 1996, the economist Joseph Stiglitz pointed out that, ironically, "not that long ago, the Confucian heritage, with its emphasis on traditional values, was cited as an explanation for why these countries had not grown."

== Territory and region data ==
=== Credit ratings ===
Country or territory	Fitch	Moody's	S&P
Hong Kong	AA	Aa2	AA+
Singapore	AAA	Aaa	AAA
South Korea	AA−	Aa2	AA
Taiwan	AA	Aa3	AA+

=== Demographics ===
Country or territory	Area (km^{2})	Population (2020)	Population density (per km^{2})	Life expectancy at birth (2020)	Median age (2020)	Birth rate (2015)	Death rate (2023)	Fertility rate (2020)	Net migration rate (2015–2020)	Population growth rate (2023)
Hong Kong	1,106	7,496,981	7,140	85.29	45	0.8%	0.80%	0.87	0.40%	0.15
Singapore	728	5,850,342	8,358	84.07	42	0.9%	0.42%	1.10	0.47%	0.90
South Korea	100,210	51,269,185	527	83.50	44	0.8%	0.73%	0.84	0.02%	0.23
Taiwan	36,197	23,816,775	673	81.04	42	0.8%	0.80%	0.99	0.13%	0.03

=== Economy ===
Country or territory	GDP (billions of USD, 2026)		GDP per capita (USD, 2026)		Trade (billions of USD, 2024)	(billions of USD, 2024)		Industrial growth rate (%) (2023)	Currency
Country or territory	Nominal	PPP	Nominal	PPP	Trade (billions of USD, 2024)	Exports	Imports	Industrial growth rate (%) (2023)	Currency
Hong Kong	$450.138	$635.594	$59,640	$84,212	$1,463	$739.9	$723.4	5.1	Hong Kong dollar
Singapore	$659.572	$1,063.242	$107,758	$173,708	$1,764	$978.6	$786.0	-2.9	Singapore dollar
South Korea	$1,931.008	$3,542.014	$37,412	$68,624	$1,528	$769.5	$758.7	-1.1	South Korean won
Taiwan	$976.719	$2,274.626	$42,103	$98,051	$869	$475.0	$394.0	3.9	New Taiwan dollar

=== Quality of life ===
Country or territory	Human Development Index (2023) data)	Income inequality by Gini coefficient	Median household income (2013), USD PPP	Median per-capita income (2013), USD PPP	Global Well Being Index (2010), % thriving
Hong Kong	0.955 (8th)	53.9 (2016)	35,443	9,705	19%
Singapore	0.946 (13th)	46.4 (2014)	32,360	7,345	19%
South Korea	0.937 (20th)	34.1 (2015)	40,861	11,350	28%
Taiwan	0.934 (21th) (Note: The HDI annual report compiled by the UNDP does not include Taiwan because it is no longer a UN member state, and is neither included as part of the People's Republic of China by the UNDP when calculating data for China. Taiwan's Statistical Bureau calculated its HDI for 2021 to be 0.926 based on UNDP's 2010 methodology, which would place Taiwan at 19th globally in 2021 within the 2022 UNDP report.)	33.6 (2014)	32,762	6,882	22%

=== Technology ===
Country or territory	Average Internet connection speed (2020)	Smartphone usage (2016)	Use of renewable electricity
Hong Kong	21.8 Mbit/s	87%	0.3%
Singapore	47.5 Mbit/s	100%	3.3%
South Korea	59.6 Mbit/s	89%	2.1%
Taiwan	28.9 Mbit/s	78%	4.4%

=== Politics ===
Country or territory	Democracy Index (2025)	Press Freedom Index (2026)	Corruption Perceptions Index (2022)	Global Competitiveness Index (2019)	Ease of doing business index (2020)	Property rights index (2015)	Bribe Payers Index (2011)	Current political status
Hong Kong	5.03	39.49	76	83.1	Very Easy (3rd)	7.6	7.6	Executive-led Special Administrative; Region of the People's Republic of China
Singapore	6.18	44.57	85	84.8	Very Easy (2nd)	8.1	8.3	Parliamentary Republic
South Korea	7.75	69.12	63	79.6	Very Easy (5th)	5.9	7.9	Presidential Republic
Taiwan	8.78	75.44	68	80.2	Very Easy (15th)	6.9	7.5	Semi-Presidential Republic

=== Organisations and groups ===
Country or territory	UN	WTO	OECD	DAC	APEC	ADB	AIIB	SEACEN	G20	EAS	ASEAN
Hong Kong	✗	✓	✗	✗	✓	✓	✓	✓	✗	✗	✗
Singapore	✓	✓	✗	✗	✓	✓	✓	✓	✗	✓	✓
South Korea	✓	✓	✓	✓	✓	✓	✓	✓	✓	✓	✓ (APT)
Taiwan	✗ (Note: Founding member of the United Nations and permanent member of the United Nations Security Council (1945–1971))	✓	✗	✗	✓	✓	✗	✓	✗	✗	✗

== See also ==
- Developed country
- Developmental state
- The Pacific Pumas
- Economic miracle (full list of miracles and "tigers")
- Asian Century
- Baltic Tiger
- Celtic Tiger
- Tatra Tiger
- Newly industrialized country
- Gulf Tiger
- Tiger economy
- Korean Wave
- Miracle on the Han River (South Korea)
- Japanese economic miracle
- Taiwan Miracle
- Taiwanese Wave
- Reform and opening up
- Tiger Cub Economies
- List of country groupings
- List of multilateral free-trade agreements
