= Baltic Tiger =

Estonia, Latvia and Lithuania during their periods of economic boom

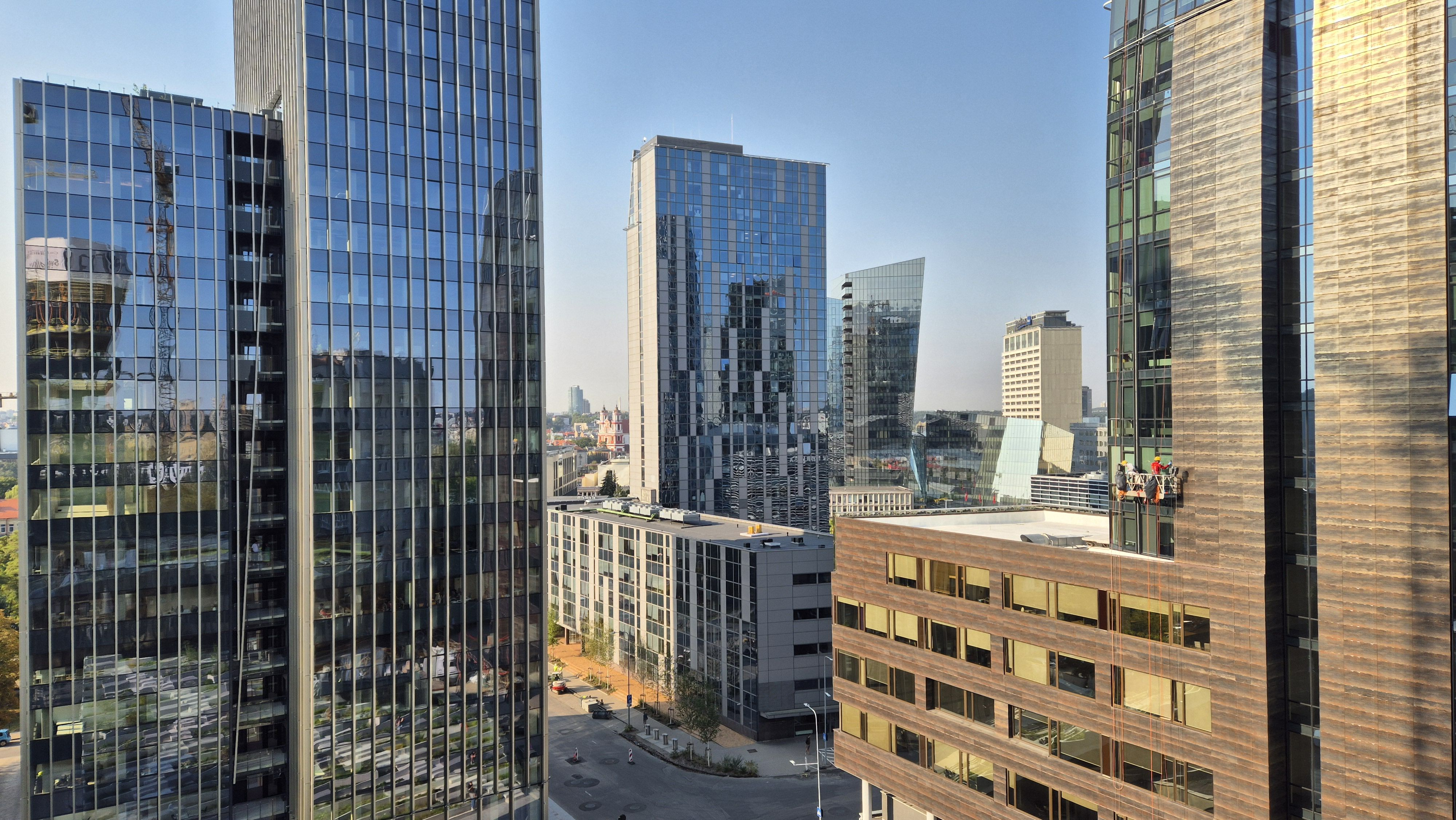
Vilnius has the largest GDP in the Baltic States (€36 billion)

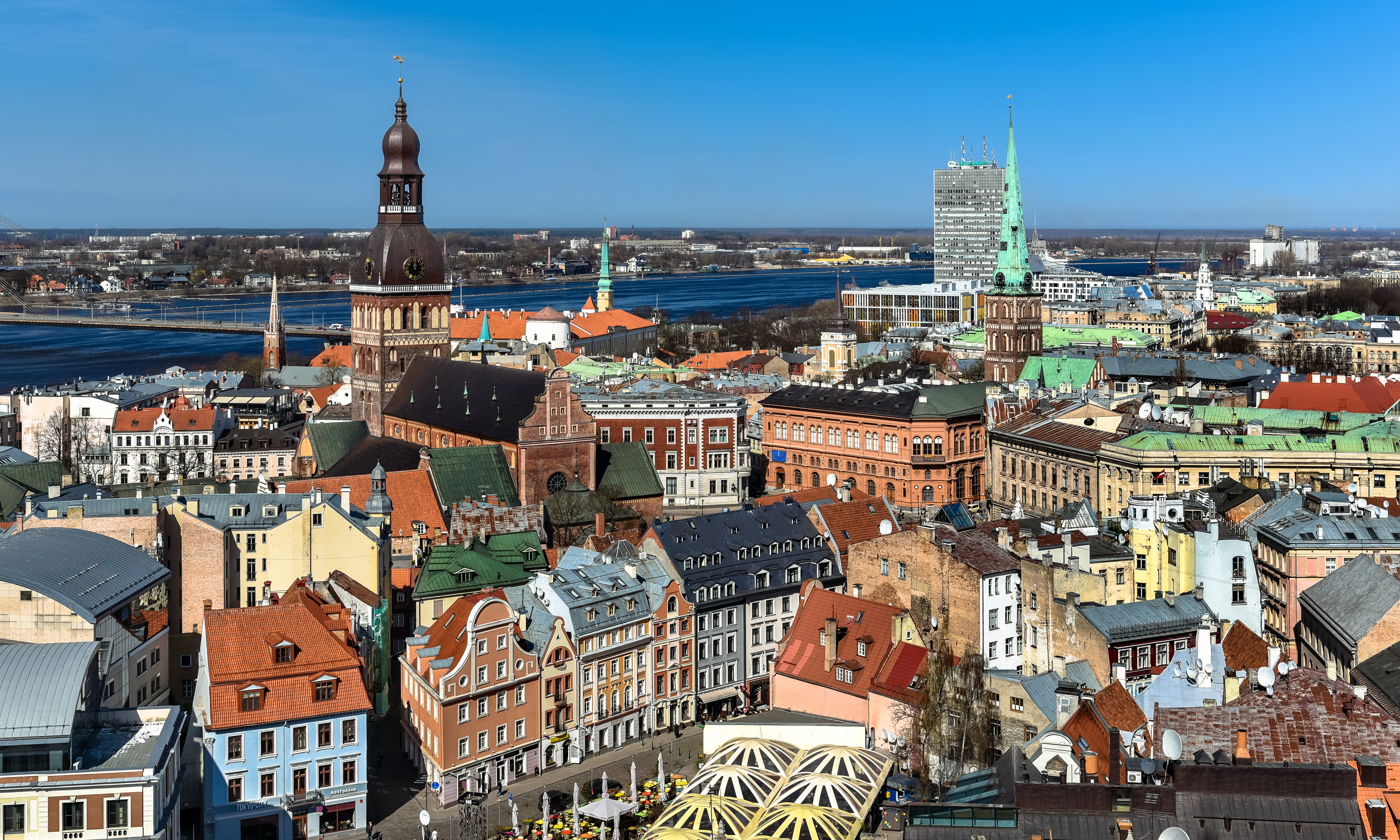
Riga has the second largest GDP in the Baltic States (€26 billion)

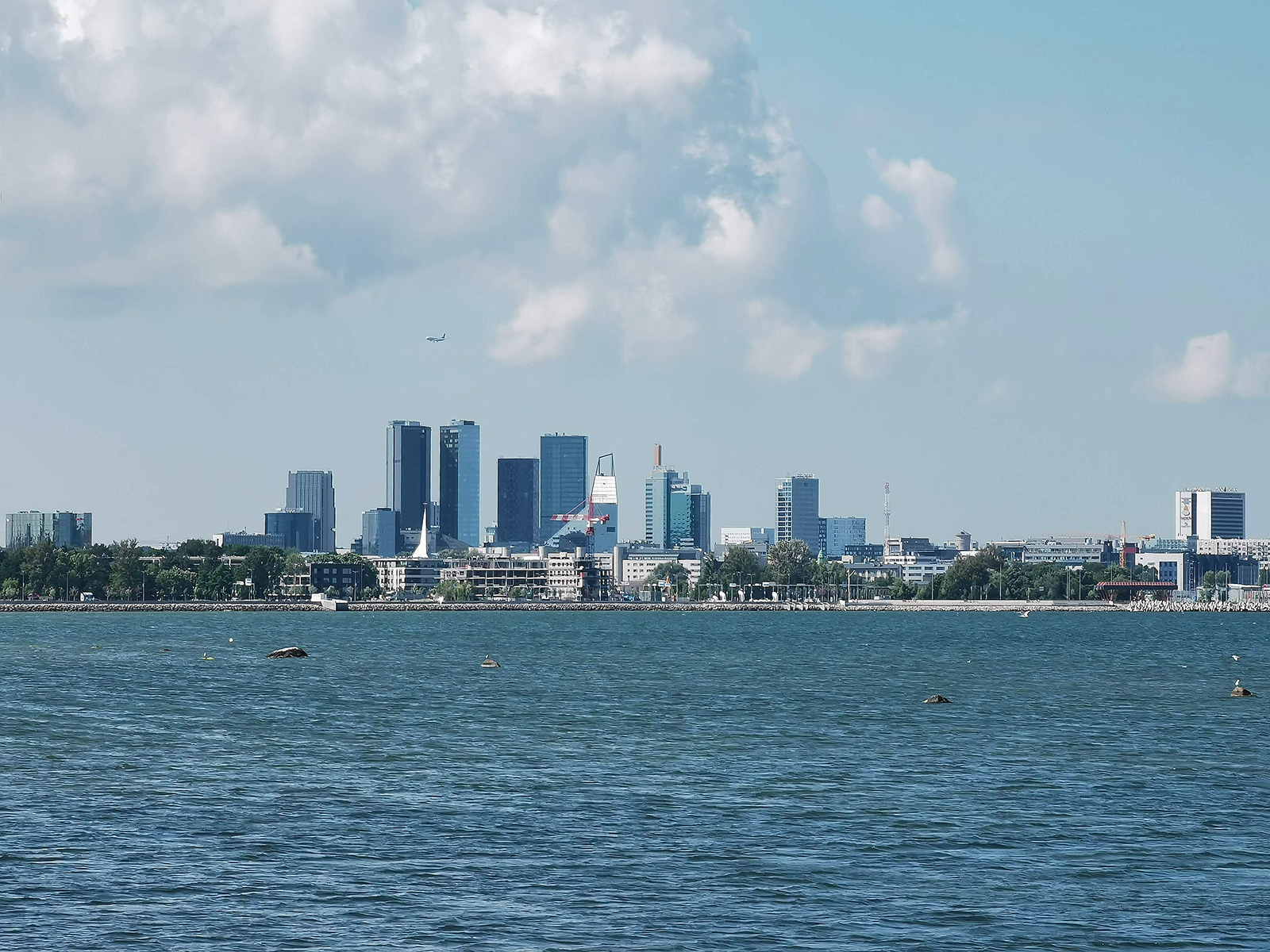
Tallinn has the third largest GDP the in Baltic States (€24 billion)

Baltic Tiger is a term used to refer to any of the three Baltic states of Estonia, Latvia, and Lithuania during their periods of economic boom, which started after the year 2000 and continued at least until 2007. The term is modeled on Four Asian Tigers, Tatra Tiger, and Celtic Tiger, which were used to describe the economic boom periods in East Asia, Slovakia, and Ireland, respectively.

== Overview ==
Real GDP per capita development of Estonia, Latvia and Lithuania

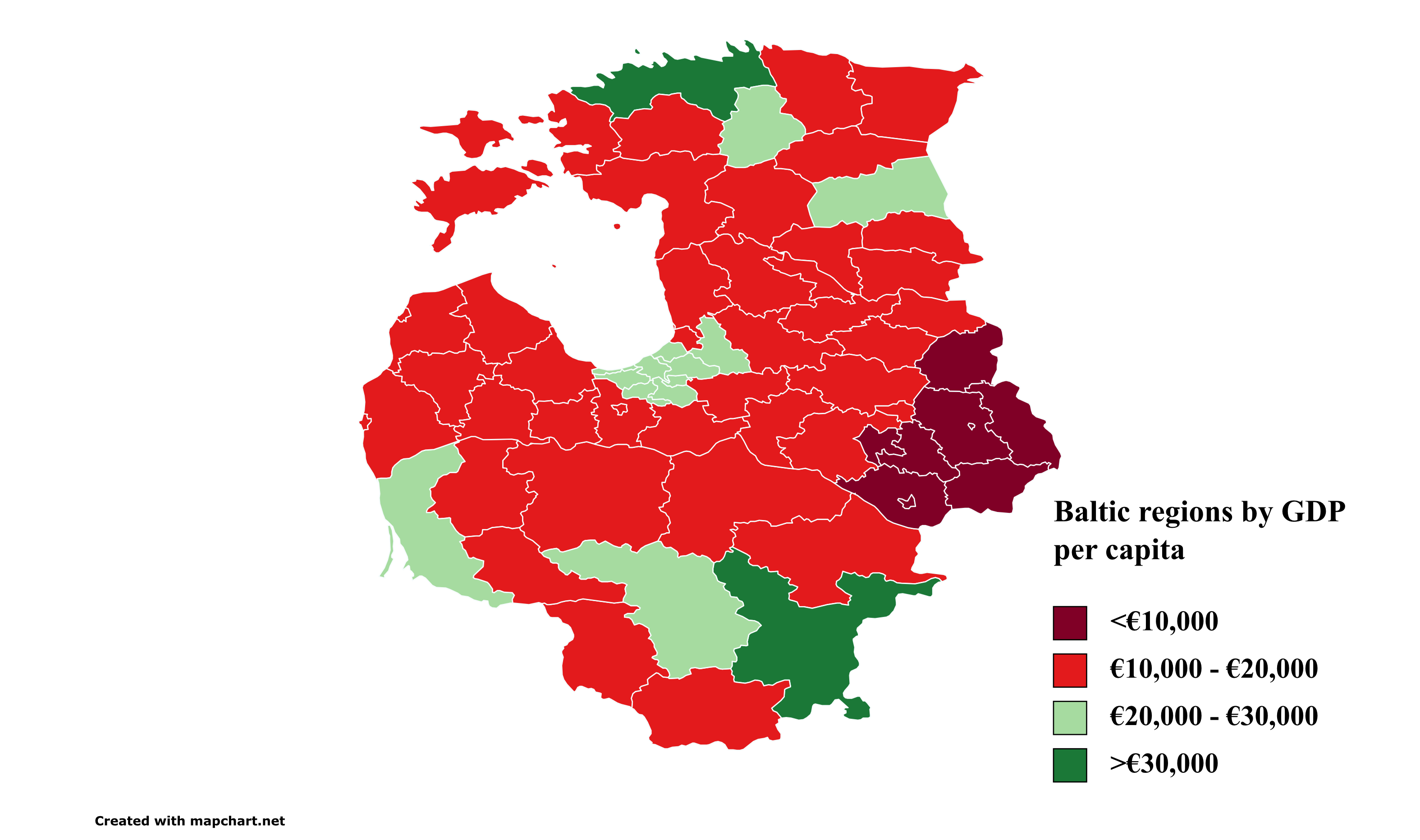
Baltic regions by GDP per capita

Economically, parallel with the political changes, and the democratic transition, – as a rule of law states – the previous command economies were transformed via the legislation into market economies, and set up or renewed the major macroeconomic factors: budgetary rules, national audit, national currency, central bank. Generally, they shortly encountered the following problems: high inflation, high unemployment, low economic growth and high government debt. The inflation rate, in the examined area, relatively quickly dropped to below 5% by 2000. Meanwhile, these economies were stabilized, and in 2004 all of them joined the European Union. New macroeconomic requirements have arisen for them; the Maastricht criteria became obligatory. Later the Stability and Growth Pact set stricter rules through national legislation by implementing e g the regulations and directives of the Sixpack, because the 2008 financial crisis was a shocking milestone.

After 2000, the Baltic Tiger economies implemented important economic reforms and liberalisation, which, coupled with their fairly low-wage and skilled labour force, attracted large amounts of foreign investment and economic growth. Between 2000 and 2007, the Baltic Tiger states had the highest growth rates in Europe. In 2006, for example, Estonia grew by 10.3% in gross domestic product, while Latvia grew by 11.9% and Lithuania by 7.5%. All three countries by February 2006 saw their rates of unemployment falling below average EU values. Additionally, Estonia went from being classified as an upper-middle income economy to a high-income economy by the World Bank in 2006 and is now considered among the ten most liberal economies in the world according to the Index of Economic Freedom.

Due to these developments, all the countries had very high capital inflows, that resulted in high current account deficits, circa 10% in 2007. The 2008 financial crisis triggered the collapse of the cross-border capital flows, causing some of the most severe recessions in Europe. A collapse of property markets, real wages decline and rise of unemployment followed. In 2008, Latvia's GDP shrank by −4.6% and Estonia's −3.6% while Lithuania's slowed to 3.0%. As the crisis swept across Eastern and Central Europe the economic reversal intensified: Estonia's GDP dropped by -16.2% year-on-year, Latvia's by −19.6% and Lithuania's by −16.8%. By mid-2009, all three countries experienced one of the deepest recessions in the world.

In 2010 the economic situation in the Baltic states stabilized and in 2011 the Baltic states experienced the fastest recoveries in the European Union, after having lost a substantial part of their populations through emigration, particularly Lithuania. Estonia's GDP grew by 8.3% in 2011, Lithuania's GDP grew by 5.9% and Latvia's GDP by 5.5%. Estonia adopted the Euro in January 2011, Latvia in 2014 and Lithuania entered the Eurozone in 2015.

== Statistics ==
=== Real GDP growth rate ===
	2014	2015	2016	2017	2018	2019	2020	2021	2022	2023	2024	2025
Estonia	▲3.3%	▲1.8%	▲3.1%	▲5.6%	▲3.7%	▲3.7%	▼-2.9%	▲8.3%	▲0.7%	▼-2.9%	▲0.1%	▲1.3%
Latvia	▲2.1%	▲3.8%	▲2.6%	▲3.4%	▲4.3%	▲0.7%	▼-3.5%	▲6.9%	▲1.7%	▼-1.0%	▲0.5%	▲2.4%
Lithuania	▲3.8%	▲2.8%	▲2.7%	▲4.6%	▲4.9%	▲4.8%	▲0.5%	▲5.4%	▲1.2%	▲2.9%	▲3.0%	▲3.0%
Data from Eurostat

=== GDP and GDP per capita ===
Baltic states by GDP (nominal) in billions of €
Country	2013	2014	2015	2016	2017	2018	2019	2020	2021	2022	2023	2024	2025
Estonia	19.163	20.366	21.011	22.189	24.316	26.439	28.472	27.859	31.456	36.443	38.188	39.510	41.621
Latvia	21.997	22.791	23.744	24.498	26.017	28.153	29.567	29.224	32.284	36.100	39.372	40.208	43.026
Lithuania	34.874	36.410	37.441	38.821	42.275	45.947	49.239	50.265	56.680	67.456	73.793	78.410	84.061

Baltic states by GDP (nominal) per capita in €
Country	2013	2014	2015	2016	2017	2018	2019	2020	2021	2022	2023	2024	2025
Estonia	14,520	15,480	16,000	16,860	18,480	20,040	21,490	20,960	23,650	27,360	27,960	28,740	30,380
Latvia	10,930	11,430	12,010	12,500	13,400	14,620	15,450	15,370	17,130	19,140	20,930	21,610	23,410
Lithuania	11,780	12,400	12,860	13,490	14,870	16,300	17,520	17,890	20,180	23,820	25,700	27,150	29,100

== See also ==
- Economy of Estonia
- Economy of Latvia
- Economy of Lithuania
- Four Asian Tigers
- Tiger Cub Economies
- Celtic Tiger
- Tatra Tiger
- Gulf Tiger
