= Tiger Cub Economies =

Economies of the five dominant countries in Southeast Asia

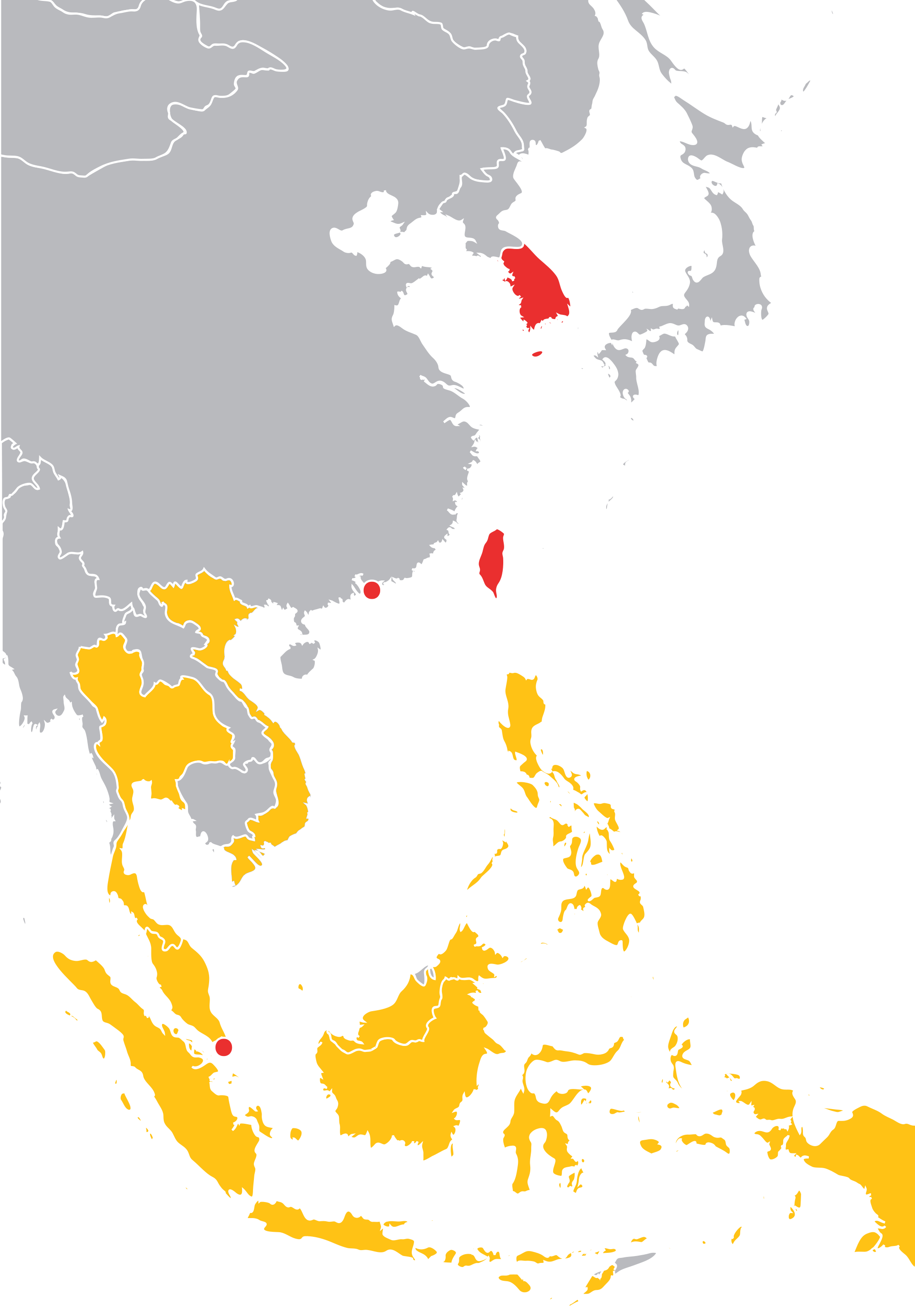
The Tiger Cub Economies (in yellow) consist of five countries, Indonesia, Malaysia, Philippines, Thailand, Vietnam. Also shown are the original tigers (South Korea, Taiwan, Singapore and Hong Kong) (in red).

The Tiger Cub Economies collectively refer to the economies of the developing countries of Indonesia, Malaysia, the Philippines, Thailand and Vietnam, the five dominant countries in Southeast Asia.

== Overview ==
The Tiger Cub Economies are so named because they attempt to follow the same export-driven model of technology and economic development already achieved by the rich, high-tech, industrialized, and developed countries of South Korea, Singapore, and Taiwan, along with the wealthy financial center of Hong Kong, which are all collectively referred to as the Four Asian Tigers. Young tigers are referred to as "cubs", the implication being that the five newly industrialized countries who make up the Tiger Cub Economies are rising Tigers. Malaysia's development as a Tiger Cub economy involved diversification away from traditional commodity exports such as palm oil and rubber toward electronics and other higher-value industries. Government policies also encouraged small and medium-sized enterprises and domestic entrepreneurship, while initiatives such as the Multimedia Super Corridor were intended to support the development of a knowledge-based economy. In fact, four countries are included in HSBC's list of top 50 economies in 2050, while Indonesia, Vietnam and the Philippines are included in Goldman Sachs's Next Eleven list of high potential economies because of their rapid growth and large population.

Overseas Chinese entrepreneurs played a major prominent role in the development of the region's private sectors. These businesses are part of the larger bamboo network, a network of overseas Chinese businesses operating in the markets of developing countries like Malaysia, Indonesia, Thailand, and the Philippines that share common family and cultural ties. China's transformation into a major economic power in the 21st century has led to increasing investments in Southeast Asian countries where the bamboo network is present.

== 2026 data ==
GDP and GDP per capita data are according to the International Monetary Fund's April 2026 data.

Rank	Country	Population in million	GDP (Nominal)	GDP Nominal per capita	GDP (Purchasing power parity)	GDP (Purchasing power parity) per capita
1	Indonesia	▲287.88	▲$1,539.87	▲$5,362	▲$5,449.145	▲$18,973
2	Thailand	▼71.56	▲$579.99	▲$8,105	▲$1,963.655	▲$27,441
3	Vietnam	▲102.18	▲$527.27	▲$5,115	▲$2,025.331	▲$19,649
4	Malaysia	▲36.38	▲$516.43	▲$15,085	▲$1,608.504	▲$46,986
5	Philippines	▲117.72	▲$512.22	▲$4,443	▲$1,572.561	▲$13,639
-	ASEAN	▲704.75	▲$4,509.56	▲$6,398	▲$14,275.72	▲$20,256

== Economies of Southeast Asia ==
=== Developing economies of the Tiger Cubs ===
- Economy of Indonesia
- Economy of Malaysia
- Economy of the Philippines
- Economy of Thailand
- Economy of Vietnam

=== Developed economies of the Four Asian Tigers ===
- Economy of Singapore
- Economy of Hong Kong
- Economy of South Korea
- Economy of Taiwan

== See also ==
- Developing country
- Flying geese paradigm
- Lee Kuan Yew
- Economic miracle
- 1997 Asian financial crisis
- Miracle on the Han River
- Taiwan Miracle
- Four Asian Tigers
- Asian Century
- Newly industrialized country
- Bamboo network
