= Newly industrialized country =

Socioeconomic classification

The category of newly industrialized country (NIC), newly industrialized economy (NIE) or middle-income country is a socioeconomic classification applied to several countries around the world by political scientists and economists. They represent a subset of developing countries whose economic growth is much higher than that of other developing countries; and where the social consequences of industrialization, such as urbanization, are reorganizing society.

== Definition ==
NICs are countries whose economies have not yet reached a developed country's status but have, in a macroeconomic sense, outpaced their developing counterparts. Such countries are still considered developing nations and only differ from other developing nations in the rate at which an NIC's growth is much higher over a shorter allotted time period compared to other developing nations. Another characterization of NICs is that of countries undergoing rapid economic growth (usually export-oriented). Incipient or ongoing industrialization is an important indicator of an NIC.

== Characteristics of newly industrialized countries ==
Newly industrialized countries can bring about an increase of stabilization in a country's social and economic status, allowing the people living in these nations to begin to experience better living conditions and better lifestyles. Another characteristic that appears in newly industrialized countries is the further development in government structures, such as democracy, the rule of law, and less corruption. Other such examples of a better lifestyle people living in such countries can experience are better transportation, electricity, and better access to water, compared to other developing countries and low infant mortality rate.

== Historical context ==
The term came into use around 1970, when the Four Asian Tigers of Taiwan, Singapore, Hong Kong and South Korea rose to become globally competitive in science, technological innovation and economic prosperity as well as NICs in the 1970s and 1980s, with exceptionally fast industrial growth since the 1960s; all four countries having since graduated into high-tech industrialized developed countries with wealthy high-income economies. There is a clear distinction between these countries and the countries now considered NICs. In particular, the combination of an open political process, high GNI per capita, and a thriving, export-oriented economic policy has shown that these East Asian economic tiger countries have roughly come to a match with developed countries as those of Western Europe as well as Canada, Japan, Israel, Australia, New Zealand and the United States.

All four countries are classified as high-income economies by the World Bank and developed countries by the International Monetary Fund (IMF) and U.S. Central Intelligence Agency (CIA). All of the Four Asian Tigers, like Western European countries, have a Human Development Index considered "very high" by the United Nations.

== Current ==
The table below presents the list of countries ranked by NICs by different authors and experts. Turkey and South Africa were classified among the world's 34 developed countries (DCs) by the CIA World Factbook in 2008. Turkey became a founding member of the OECD in 1961 and Mexico joined in 1994. The G8+5 group is composed of the original G8 members in addition to China, India, Mexico, South Africa and Brazil. The members of the G20 include Brazil, China, India, Indonesia, Mexico, South Africa and Turkey.

Note: Green-colored cells indicate highest value or best performance in index, while yellow-colored cells indicate the opposite.

Country	GDP (nominal) 2026 (IMF)		GDP (PPP) 2026 (IMF)		Income inequality (GINI) (2011–25)	Human Development Index (HDI, 2023)	Real GDP growth rate (2026)
Country	(USD millions)	(USD per capita)	(current Int$ millions)	(current Int$, per capita)	Income inequality (GINI) (2011–25)	Human Development Index (HDI, 2023)	Real GDP growth rate (2026)
South Africa	489,083	7,659	1,075,434	16,841	63 (2014)	0.741 (high)	1.0
Brazil	2,654,761	12,397	5,266,506	24,594	51.6 (2023)	0.786 (high)	2.2
Mexico	2,176,236	16,191	3,594,397	26,743	43.5 (2022)	0.789 (high)	1.6
China	21,546,403	15,371	44,554,951	31,786	36.0 (2022)	0.797 (high)	4.5
India	4,060,207	2,749	19,192,617	12,998	25.5 (2022)	0.685 (medium)	7.0
Philippines	501,692	4,360	1,569,841	13,642	39.3 (2023)	0.720 (high)	3.4
Malaysia	547,100	15,981	1,624,495	47,453	40.7 (2021)	0.819 (very high)	5.2
Indonesia	1,479,954	5,153	5,483,042	19,091	34.9 (2024)	0.728 (high)	5.1
Thailand	599,115	8,372	1,983,943	27,724	33.5 (2023)	0.798 (high)	2.1
Turkey	1,817,987	21,079	4,025,804	46,679	44.5 (2022)	0.853 (very high)	2.7

For China and India, their immense population (each with over 1.4 billion people as of May 2024) means that per capita income will remain low even if either economy surpasses that of the United States in overall GDP. When GDP per capita is calculated according to purchasing power parity (PPP), this takes into account the lower costs of living in each newly industrialized country. Nominal GDP per capita typically is an indicator for living standards in a given country as well.

Brazil, China, India, Mexico and South Africa meet annually with the G8 countries to discuss financial topics and climate change, due to their economic importance in today's global market and environmental impact, in a group known as G8+5.

=== Other ===
Authors set lists of countries accordingly to different methods of economic analysis. Sometimes a work ascribes NIC status to a country that other authors do not consider a NIC. This is the case of countries such as Brunei, Mongolia, and Vietnam.

Country	GDP (nominal) (millions of USD, 2024 IMF)	GDP per capita (nominal) (USD, 2024 IMF)	GDP (PPP) (millions of current Int$, 2024 IMF)	GDP per capita (PPP) (current Int$, 2024 IMF)	Income inequality (GINI) (2019–22)	Human Development Index (HDI, 2023)	Real GDP growth rate (2025)
Brunei	16,679	37,023	42,815	95,039	36.6 (2019)	0.837 (very high)	1.8
Mongolia	27,242	7,576	73,764	20,514	31.4 (2022)	0.747 (high)	5.5
Vietnam	514,286	5,026	1,907,948	18,868	36.1 (2022)	0.766 (high)	6.5

== Criticism ==
NICs usually benefit from comparatively low wage costs, which translates into lower input prices for suppliers. As a result, it is often easier for producers in NICs to outperform and outproduce factories in developed countries, where the cost of living is higher, and trade unions and other organizations have more political sway. This comparative advantage is often criticized by advocates of the fair trade movement.

== Problems ==
While South Africa is considered wealthy on a wealth-per-capita basis, economic inequality is persistent and extreme poverty remains high in the country. South Africa is a NIC with 34% of population unemployed and poor.

Other NICs face common problems such as widespread corruption and political instability, as well as other circumstances that cause them to face the middle income trap.

== See also ==
- List of countries by GNI (real) per capita
- Gender Development Index
- Emerging market
- Flying geese paradigm
- Global North and Global South
- Industrialisation
- Mechanization
- Mass production
- Science in newly industrialized countries
- Second World

=== Groupings ===
- BRIC / MINT / Next Eleven
- BRICS
- CIVETS
- G8+5
- G20
- G20 developing nations
