= Tatra Tiger =

Slovakian economic period (2002–2007)

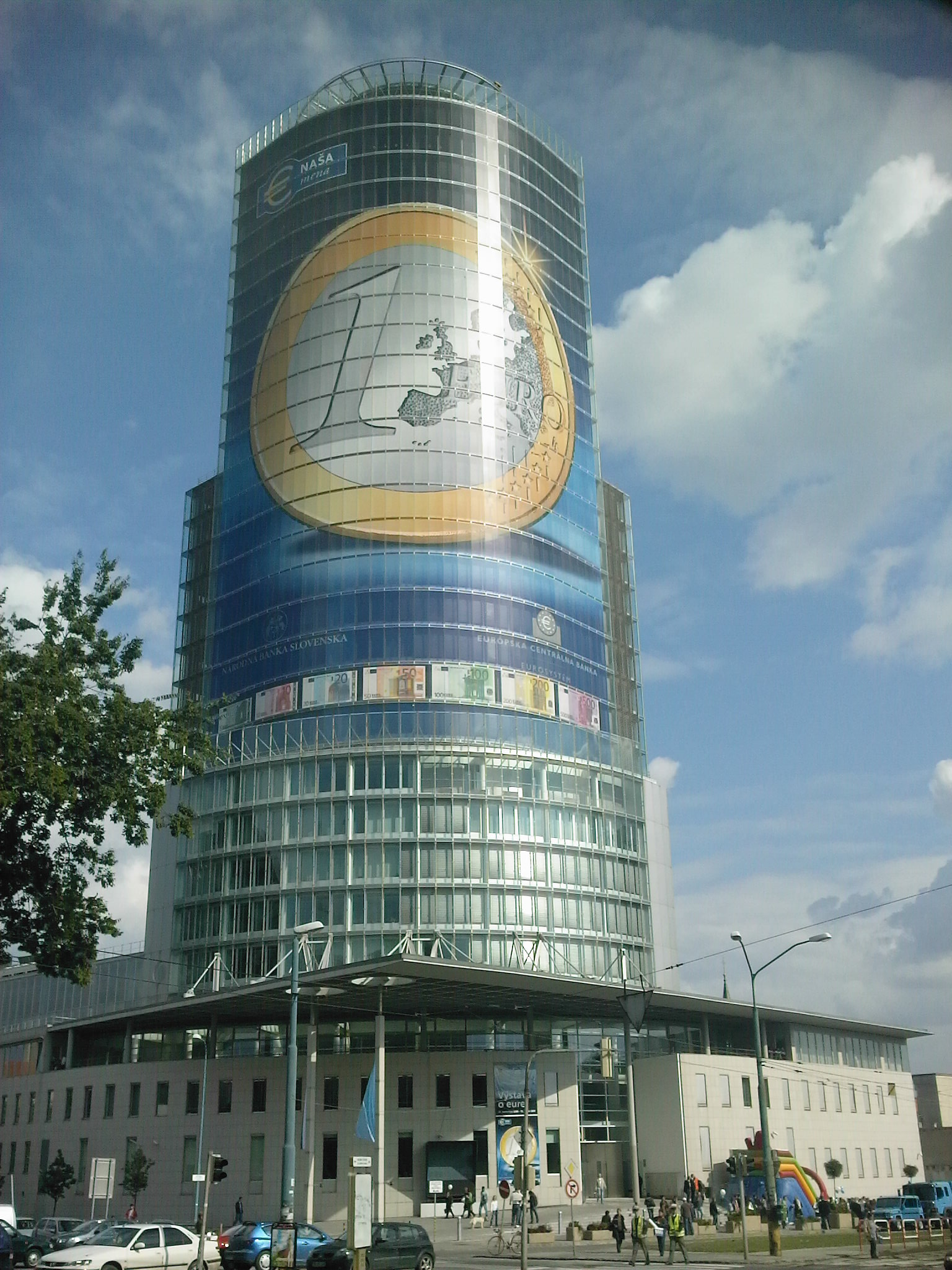
The National Bank of Slovakia.

"Tatra Tiger" is a nickname that refers to the economy of Slovakia in period 2002 – 2007, following the ascendance of a right-leaning coalition in September 2002 which engaged in a program of liberal economic reforms. The name "Tatra Tiger" derives from the local Tatra mountain range.

In 2004 and 2005, Slovakia had one of the highest gross domestic product growth rates in the European Union after some of the Baltic countries, reaching 6%. In 2006, the year-over-year growth amounted to an unexpected 9.8% in the 3rd quarter, which helped to increase the overall annual economic growth expectation for 2006 from 6–6.5% to 8.2%. This 9.8% growth (a low estimate) can be partly ascribed to the launch of production at a new Peugeot SA plant. The growth came as a surprise to local analysts, given that another big foreign investor, Kia, launched its production in late 2006. In 4Q of 2007, the growth was 14.3%.

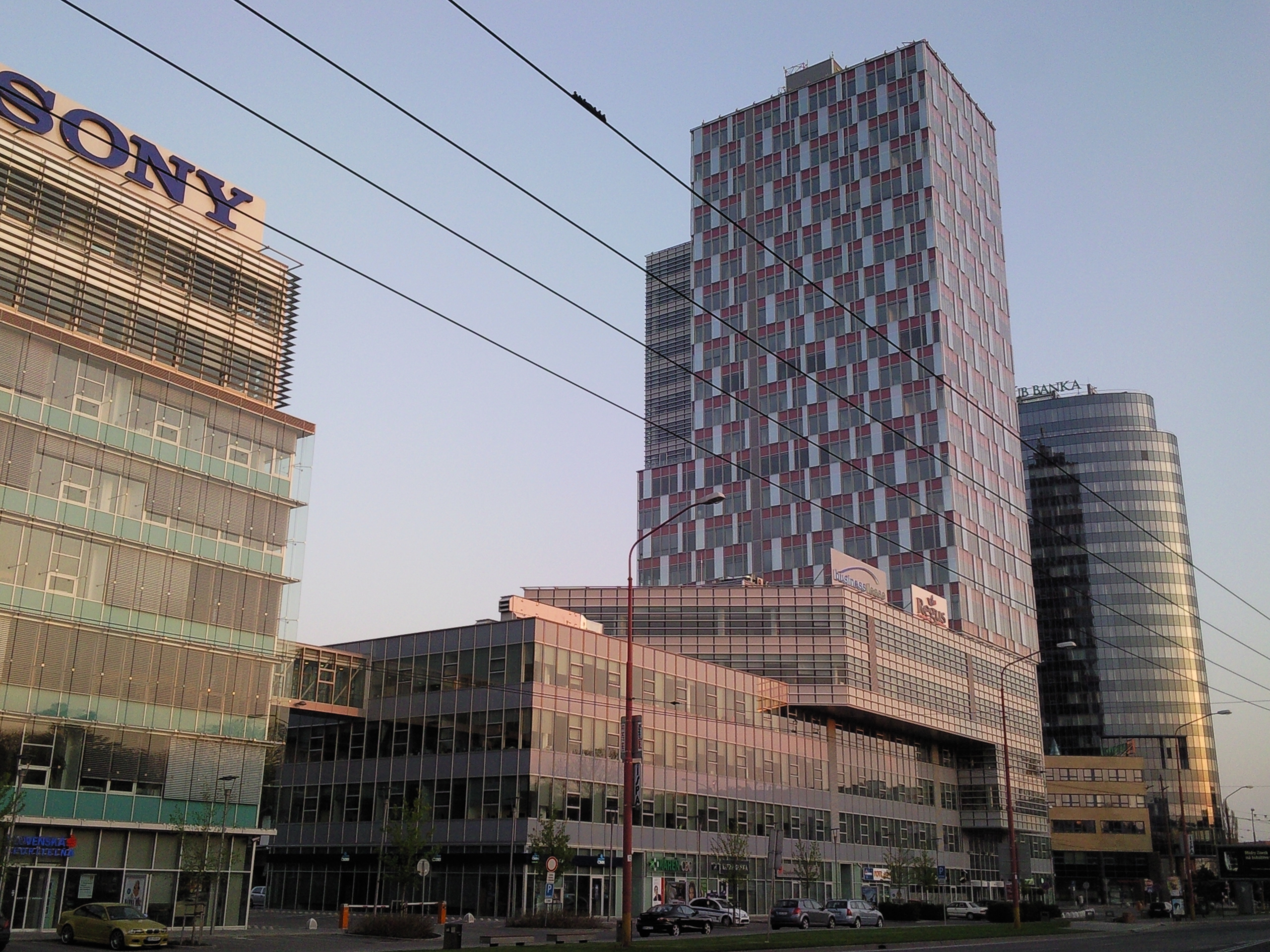
High-rise buildings at Mlynské Nivy, one of Bratislava's main business districts. (around 2008)

However, public polling showed that despite the resultant high growth rates, the public did not universally approve of the reforms, because they were associated with a drastic loss of government programs (reform of the previously government-run health system, complete reform of the pension system, etc.), the replacement of progressive taxation with a flat tax, which largely contributed to the rapid growth by matching the Slovak income tax rate at 19% to the income tax rate in Netherlands, thus achieving an unprecedented inflow of investors, rapid changes of laws and other legal regulations, and rising property prices. Moreover, unemployment jumped to very high levels immediately after the reforms began in 1998, although it decreased back to its 1998 level in 2006 and even below later on. However, critics point out that the drop in unemployment was caused by the outflow of labor force abroad, after Slovakia joined the European Union in 2004, and thus the level of unemployment was not reflecting the real economic situation in Slovakia.

In the first quarter of 2009 the growth of GDP was −5.7% but in 2010 it was 4.8% for the same quarter. The brief recession reflected the global economic turmoil following the 2008 financial crisis.

In the period 2005–2011 Slovakia's GDP increased by 38.3% which was the highest growth of all EU countries.

== Statistics ==
=== Annual GDP growth rate ===
	2000	2001	2002	2003	2004	2005	2006	2007	2008	2009	2010	2011	2012	2013	2014	2015	2016	2017
Slovakia	1.4%	3.5%	4.6%	5.4%	5.3%	6.4%	8.5%	10.8%	5.7%	−5.5%	5.1%	2.8%	1.5%	1.4%	2.6%	3.8%	3.3%	3.4%
Data from Eurostat

=== GDP per capita ===
In international dollars, at purchasing power parity (PPP) and Nominal GDP per capita. Numbers in brackets show the respective country's GDP per capita as a percentage of the European Union average (also measured at PPP).

	2000	2001	2002	2003	2004	2005	2006	2007	2008	2009	2010	2011	2012	2013	2014	2015	2016	2017	2018	2019	2020	2021
Slovakia (PPP)	12,344 (50%)	13,082 (52%)	13,889 (54%)	14,925 (55%)	16,142 (57%)	17,766 (60%)	19,850 (63%)	22,583 (68%)	24,306 (73%)	23,136 (73%)	24,549 (73%)	25,758 (73%)	26,629 (75%)	27,467	28,729	30,219	31,475	33,041	35,129	37,021	39,046	41,094
Data from International Monetary Fund																						

	2000	2001	2002	2003	2004	2005	2006	2007	2008	2009	2010	2011	2012	2013	2014	2015	2016	2017	2018	2019	2020	2021
Slovakia (Nominal)	3,832	3,976	4,620	6,330	8,027	9,129	10,683	14,349	18,048	16,567	16,634	18,223	17,294	18,205	18,668	16,197	16,564	17,627	19,581	20,155	21,506	22,821
Data from International Monetary Fund

== See also ==
- Four Asian Tigers: the original economic "tigers"—Hong Kong, Singapore, South Korea, and Taiwan—that experienced a period of high growth and industrialization between the 1960s and 1990s.
- Celtic Tiger: Ireland's nickname during its period of rapid growth between the 1995 and 2007 before a property crash.
- Baltic Tiger: a reference to the rapid economic growth of the Baltic states between the 2000s and 2006–2007.
- Gulf Tiger: a nickname for the economic boom that Dubai has been experiencing since the 1990s.
- Nordic Tiger: Iceland's nickname during its period of rapid growth between the 1990s and 2008 before a banking crash.
- Patagonian Tiger: Chile's informal nickname during its period of rapid economic growth due to a surge in copper prices and sound economic policy from the early 1990s to 2019 until the Social Outburst (Chile).
