= Economic miracle =

Informal economic term

Economic miracle is an informal economic term for a period of dramatic economic development that is entirely unexpected or unexpectedly strong. Economic miracles have occurred in the recent histories of a number of countries, often those undergoing an economic boom or described as a tiger economy.

== Great Divergence ==
- Commercial revolution (c. 1000–1760)
- Industrial Revolution (c. 1760–1840)
- Second Industrial Revolution (c. 1870–1914)

== Post-World War II ==
- Swiss miracle (c. 1940s–2000s)
- Japanese economic miracle (c. 1950s–1973)
- Trente Glorieuses (France, c. 1945–1975)
- Record years (Sweden, c. 1947–1974)
- Wirtschaftswunder (West Germany and Austria, c. 1950s–1970s)
- Mexican miracle (c. 1940s–1970s) — term not used by economists
- Belgian economic miracle (1945–1948)
- Greek economic miracle (1950–1973) — eventually followed by downturn
- Italian economic miracle (c. 1950–1973)
- Spanish miracle (1959–1974)
- Costarrican Ochomogo economic miracle (1950–1979)
- Four Asian Tigers (South Korea, Taiwan, Hong Kong, and Singapore, c. 1960s–1990s)
  - Miracle on the Han River (South Korea, c. 1962–1997)
  - Taiwan Miracle (1961–2000)

== Later ==
- Tiger Cub Economies (Indonesia, Malaysia, Thailand, the Philippines, and Vietnam, c. 2010s–present)
  - Indonesian economic boom (1976–present)
  - Malaysian miracle (1971–1997)
  - Philippine economic boom (1986–present)
  - Thai economic boom (1985–1997, 2001–2006)
  - Đổi Mới (Vietnam, 1986–present)
- Brazilian Miracle (1968–1973)
- Miracle of Chile (1975–2010)
- Economic liberalisation in India (1991–present)
- Reform and opening up (China, 1978–present)
- Massachusetts Miracle (1980s)
- Polish economic miracle (1992–present)
- Gulf Tiger (Dubai city, c. 1990s–2008)
- Celtic Tiger (Ireland, c. 1995–2007)
- Belarusian economic miracle (1996-2014)
- Baltic Tiger (Estonia, Latvia, or Lithuania, c. 2000–2007)
- Tatra Tiger (Slovakia, 2002–2007)
- 2000s Turkish economic boom (Turkey, c. 2000–2018)
- Adriatic Tiger (Slovenia, 2004–2009)
- Carpat Tiger (Romania, 1991–2009)

== Bibliography ==
- Seliger, Bernhard (2010). "Theories of economic miracles" (PDF). Diskurs (1): 1–26. Archived from the original (PDF) on 21 January 2022.
