= Tikhon Kiselyov =

Soviet Belarusian politician (1917-1983)

- Тихон Киселёв
- Kiselyov in 1973

First Secretary of the Communist Party of Byelorussia
- In office 15 October 1980 – 11 January 1983
- Head of state: Ivan Paliakoŭ
- Head of government: Aleksandr Aksyonov; Vladimir Brovikov; Mikhail Kovalev
- Preceded by: Pyotr Masherov; Vladimir Brovikov (acting)
- Succeeded by: Vladimir Brovikov (acting); Nikolay Slyunkov

Deputy Chairman of the Council of Ministers
- In office 5 December 1978 – 23 October 1980
- Premier: Alexei Kosygin

Chairman of the Council of Ministers of the Byelorussian SSR (Head of government of the Byelorussian SSR)
- In office 9 April 1959 – 11 December 1978
- Leader: Kirill Mazurov; Pyotr Masherov
- Head of state: Vasily Kozlov; Valentina Klochkova (acting); Sergey Pritytsky; Ivan Klimov (acting); Fyodor Surganov; Vladimir Lobanok (acting); Zinaida Bychkovskaya (acting); Ivan Paliakoŭ
- Preceded by: Nikolai Avkhimovich
- Succeeded by: Aleksandr Aksyonov

Candidate member of the 25th, 26th Politburo
- In office 21 October 1980 – 11 January 1983

Full member of the 22nd, 23rd, 24th, 25th, 26th Central Committee
- In office 31 October 1961 – 11 January 1983

Personal details
- Born: 30 July 1917 Mogilev Governorate, Russian Empire
- Died: 11 January 1983 (aged 65) Minsk, Byelorussian SSR, Soviet Union
- Party: Communist Party of the Soviet Union (1940–1983)
- Other political affiliations: Communist Party of Byelorussia
- Profession: Civil servant

Tikhon Yakovlevich Kiselyov (Russian: Ти́хон Я́ковлевич Киселёв, Belarusian: Ціхан Якаўлевіч Кісялёў; 12 August (O.S.: 30 July), 1917 – 11 January 1983) was a Belarusian statesman in the Soviet Union, the leader (first secretary) of the Communist Party of Byelorussia, i.e., the de facto leader of the Byelorussian SSR (1980–1983).

== Career ==
=== Party ===
- 1940: member of the CPSU
- 1961: member of the CPSU Central Committee
- 1980: first secretary of Central Committee the Communist Party of Byelorussia
- 1980: CPSU Central Committee Politbureau candidate

=== Government ===
- 1954: member of the Supreme Soviet of the USSR
- 1959-1978: Chairman of the BSSR Council of Ministers
- 1978-1980: Deputy Chairman of the USSR Council of Ministers
- 1981: member of the Presidium of the Supreme Soviet of the USSR

== Awards ==
- 1977: Hero of Socialist Labor
- Two Orders of Lenin
- Order of the Badge of Honor
- Medals
