= Belarusian economic miracle =

Period of economic growth in late 20th- and early 21st-century Belarus

The Belarusian economic miracle was a period of significant economic growth, urbanisation, and social change in Belarus during the late 20th and early 21st centuries. Beginning under Kirill Mazurov, the Belarusian economy began a process of industrialisation which greatly accelerated under Pyotr Masherov. It continued until the 2008 financial crisis, as Belarus endured the dissolution of the Soviet Union and subsequent economic problems within the region without wide-reaching privatisation. The economic model of Belarus during this time period has since been referred to the Belarusian model, and has since been attributed to the government of Alexander Lukashenko by Western analysts.

== Background ==
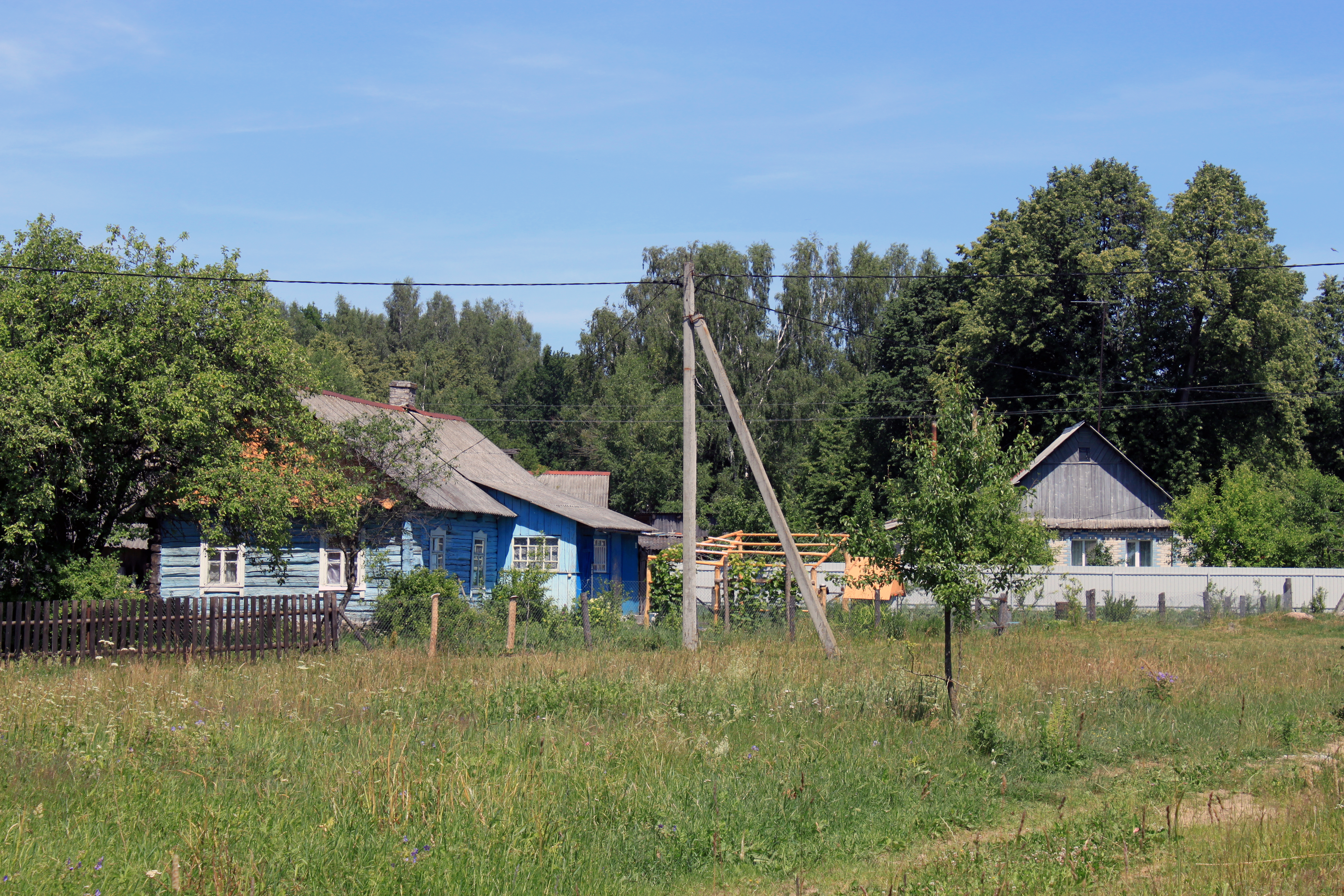
Prior to the mid-1950s, most of Belarus comprised small villages (modern example Siemierniki pictured)

Prior to World War II and the German occupation, Belarus had been an economic backwater that had largely avoided the industrialisation, urbanisation, and economic development occurring in the surrounding region at the time. By 1940, only 21.3% of the country's population lived in urban areas. The country lacked the agricultural strength of Ukraine to the south and the industrial capabilities of Ural. Following the Russian Revolution, the new Soviet government invested little effort into industrialising Belarus, perceiving it as vulnerable to invasion.

The Belarusian population and economy suffered greatly from World War II and the subsequent German occupation. As much as one third to forty-five percent of the country's population was killed, and eighty percent of towns and villages in the country were destroyed, many of them deliberately as part of Generalplan Ost. Eighty percent of the capital, Minsk, was destroyed. Following the end of the war, Belarusian economic output was 20% of its pre-war level.

Efforts to provide economic necessities to Belarus, such as food and agricultural machinery, began shortly after the liberation of Belarus in 1944. Belarus's economy was also boosted by economic migrants from the rest of the Soviet Union and the return of evacuated industry to Belarus. By 1950, Belarusian economic output was equal to that of pre-war levels.

At the same time, Belarusian politics and economics became dominated by former members of the Belarusian partisans after most pre-war Belarusian leadership was killed in fighting. The heads of all six regions of Belarus were former partisan commanders, while the office of First Secretary of the Communist Party of Byelorussia was held by ethnic Russians. The period between the liberation of Belarus and the death of Joseph Stalin in 1953 was marked by dominance of both partisans from Eastern Belorussia and party cadres from other republics of the Soviet Union, particularly in Western Belarus, where among 1,175 party workers only 121 were Belarusians in 1953. This policy was reversed during the brief rule of Lavrentiy Beria, and continued after Beria's execution. These partisans would later oversee the Belarusian economic miracle.

The early- to mid-1950s were marked by conflict between Nikolai Patolichev, First Secretary of the CPB, and Mikhail Zimyanin, former Second Secretary of the CPB. Zimyanin, a former partisan commander and Beria's choice for First Secretary of the CPB, argued for greater protections for collective farmers in Belarus, increase of wages, and improved housing, and accused Patolichev of paying insufficient attention to the conditions of rural Belarusians. With Beria's execution, however, Zimyanin's effort to replace Patolichev and reform the Belarusian economy ultimately ended in failure.

== History ==
=== Mazurov period (before 1965) ===
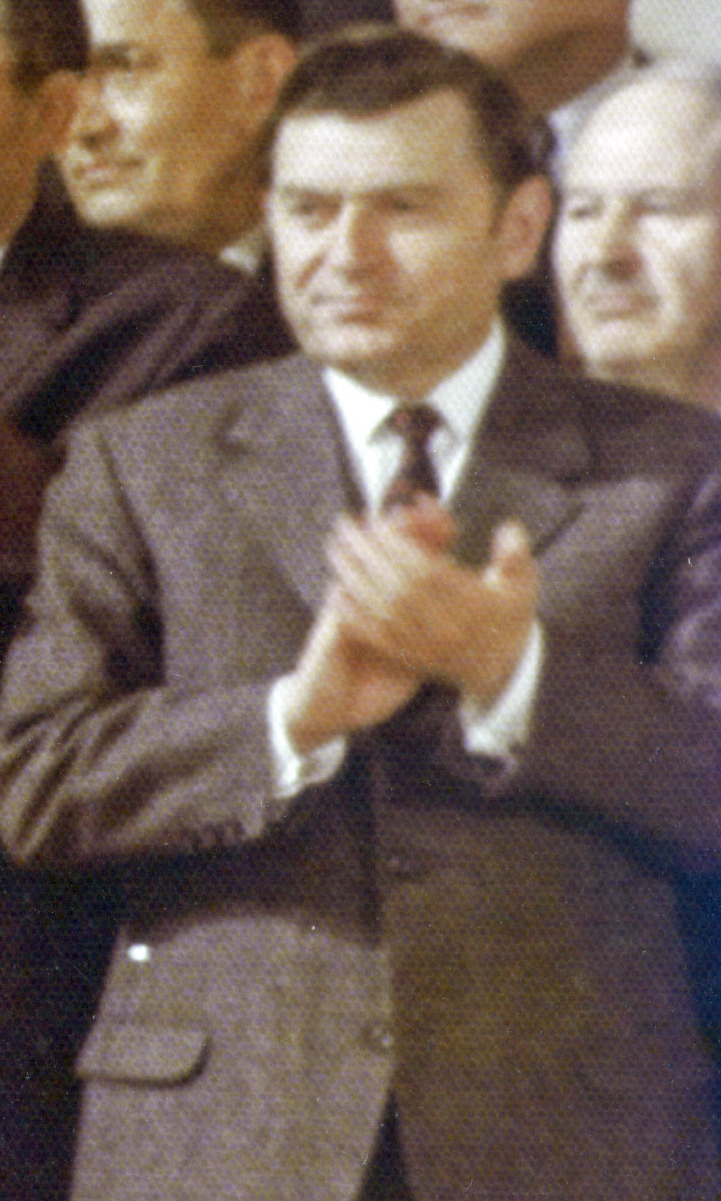
Kirill Mazurov, First Secretary from 1956 to 1965, launched the economic reforms

Kirill Mazurov became First Secretary of the Communist Party of Byelorussia in 1956. His tenure in power marked the beginning of the economic miracle, and coincided with the global Digital Revolution. In an effort to increase the Belarusian economy's diversity, Mazurov sought to expand the technological industry. He invested heavily into education, and as a result by 1961 Belarus had more schools and universities per population than more developed countries like the United Kingdom, France, Japan, Italy, and West Germany. Under Mazurov's rule, roughly 450 state-owned enterprises were created, primarily in the chemical, electronic, energy, and petroleum fields.

Mazurov also focused on curbing alcoholism in Belarus, in connection with Nikita Khrushchev's Soviet-wide anti-alcohol campaign, which had itself been announced during a 22 January 1958 meeting in Minsk. More than 12,000 moonshine stills were destroyed throughout the republic, and almost 300,000 litres of moonshine were dumped during the campaign. 8,347 of the 38,178 arrests in the Byelorussian SSR during this period were on the basis of selling moonshine, ahead of those charged with hooliganism, murder, and theft.

Among the most well-known companies established under Mazurov were automobile manufacturer BelAZ, potash producer Belaruskali, and the Mogilev Metallurgical Combine. The first oil and gas pipelines were also constructed in Belarus. However, according to historians L. Ju. Malychin, S. M. Vasovič, N. M. Kavaliova, and V. M. Kuzmič, Belarus's economic growth under Mazurov was hampered by the continued planned economy. Mazurov made efforts to resolve these issues with the liberalisation of the party (part of the broader process of De-Stalinisation in the Soviet Union), expansion of pensions, and reducing taxes on private farms in an effort to equalise them with collective farms.

=== Masherov period and acceleration of growth (1965–1980) ===
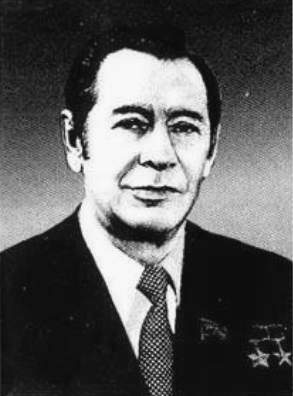
Pyotr Masherov, First Secretary from 1965 to 1980, is most associated with the economic miracle.

When Mazurov was promoted into the central Communist Party apparatus, he recommended Pyotr Masherov as his successor. A partisan leader like Mazurov, Masherov had previously been Deputy Head of the Council of Ministers, and the two had a shared interest in the republic's economic development. The new leader devoted himself to the strengthening of the Belarusian technological sector as his first task. During Masherov's rule, the Belarusian academia grew at a scale unmatched by other republics: more than ten thousand individuals acquired a Candidate of Sciences degree, a similar number acquired a Doctor of Science degree, and tens of thousands of academic works were submitted to the Belarusian Academy of Sciences. Belarus became one of the main exporting republics of the Soviet Union, with over one thousand different products across 100 countries, including both socialist and capitalist states.

The development of Belarusian industry also further accelerated under Masherov: state-owned enterprises such as the Gomel Chemical Factory, Polymir, and Grodno Azot were established, as were high-tech industries such as television producer Haryzont, camera manufacturer BelOMO, and semiconductor manufacturer Integral, the latter eventually growing to become the largest company in the Eastern Bloc by the time of Masherov's 1980 death. Other developments included the Byaroza and Lukoml thermal power stations and the Minsk Metro.

As a result of Masherov's economic efforts, from 1966 to 1970 alone the Byelorussian SSR's gross domestic product increased by more than half. Grain harvests under Masherov's rule increased from 2.3 million to 7 million tonnes, and Minsk was completely rebuilt. As a result of the economic advances under Masherov, Belarus was popularly known as the "assembly shop of the Union" among the Soviet public.

=== Post-Masherov period, independence, and Lukashenko's rule (1980–2008) ===
Masherov's death resulted in an effective power vacuum in the republic, and his successor, Mikalay Slyonkow, was less fortunate in dealing with economic issues. The 1986 Chernobyl disaster, which dominated Belarusian politics in the 1980s, led to widespread political and economic instability. Instability was also present in the early post-independence period, leading to Alexander Lukashenko being elected as president in 1994.

The relative prosperity of Belarus in comparison to other post-Soviet states has led to the belief in Western states that Lukashenko was responsible for the development of the Belarusian economic miracle. This belief is particularly predominant among members of the political left, who have positively compared Belarus to Cuba as an example of a country avoiding capitalism. However, historian Andrew Wilson has rejected this claim, noting that following a 1992–1995 period of privatisation, Lukashenko turned to an economic policy based on Russian economic subsidies and the loosening of export restrictions after the establishment of the Union State in 1999.

Subsidies on Russian crude oil, coupled with high petroleum prices during the late 1990s and early 2000s and the usage of illicit methods of obtaining money by the Belarusian government, allowed Lukashenko to initially develop the left-wing economic model that has since become associated with his government. However, decreased Russian support after Lukashenko's 2006 re-election caused him to pursue a new policy of economic liberalisation in an effort to keep the economy afloat. The timing of these reforms coincided with the 2007–2009 Great Recession, which hit Belarus particularly hard. Russian exports were dramatically reduced, and the decreased price of Belarus's own exports resulted in an economic shortfall of between $6 and $7 million. As a result of the Great Recession, the Belarusian GDP decreased by 4.5% after previous GDP growth had carried it through the remainder of the previous year.

Lukashenko's previous economic liberalisation, coupled with thawing relations with the European Union and United States, allowed him to obtain a series of loans from the International Monetary Fund. Additional measures were made, in violation of IMF loans, to improve the economy through direct state involvement. Still not enough, the government pursued a policy of massive borrowing from Russia, Azerbaijan, India, Venezuela, and particularly from China, which lent $5.7 billion to Belarus in December 2009. As a result of Lukashenko's economic policy during this period, the GDP rose by 0.2%, but at a cost: Belarusian debts numbered 52% of the country's GDP by 2010.

The results of Lukashenko's economic liberalisation and the Great Recession resulted in the end of the Belarusian economic model. In its stead, Lukashenko later sought greater foreign investment and limited economic liberalisation.
