= Sergey Pritytsky =

Polish-born Soviet Belarusian politician and partisan commander (1913–1971)

- Сяргей Прытыцкі; Сергей Притыцкий

Chairman of the Presidium of the Supreme Soviet of the Byelorussian SSR (Head of state of the Byelorussian SSR)
- In office 22 January 1968 – 13 June 1971
- Leader: Pyotr Masherov
- Head of government: Tikhon Kiselyov
- Preceded by: Vasily Kozlov; Fyodor Surganov (acting); Valentina Klochkova (acting)
- Succeeded by: Ivan Klimov (acting); Valentina Klochkova (acting); Fyodor Surganov

Secretary of the Central Committee of the Communist Party of Byelorussia
- In office 1962–1968

Deputy Head of the Cabinet of Ministers of the Byelorussian Soviet Socialist Republic
- In office 1962–1968

Personal details
- Born: 1 February 1913 Harkawicze, Grodno Governorate, Russian Empire (now Poland)
- Died: 13 June 1971 (aged 58) Minsk, Byelorussian SSR, Soviet Union (now Belarus)
- Party: Communist Party of the Soviet Union
- Other political affiliations: Communist Party of West Belarus
- Spouse: Tatyana Pritytskaya
- Awards: Order of Lenin (4); Order of the Red Banner

Military service
- Allegiance: Soviet Union
- Branch/service: Soviet partisans
- Battles/wars: World War II; Siege of Mogilev; Belarusian resistance; Polish resistance

Sergey Osipovich Pritytsky (Note: Belarusian: Сяргей Восіпавіч Прытыцкі, romanized: Siarhei Vosipavich Prytytski; Polish: Sergiusz Prytycki; Russian: Сергей Осипович Притыцкий) (1 February 1913 – 13 June 1971) was a Belarusian Soviet communist activist, politician, and partisan commander. Having started as a communist activist in Western Belarus (then part of the Second Polish Republic), after the Soviet invasion of Poland he became a high-ranking politician in the Byelorussian Soviet Socialist Republic.

== Childhood ==
Pritytsky was born on 1 February 1913, in Harkawicze (Belarusian: Гаркавічы) in the Polish-Belarusian borderlands, then part of the Russian Empire, as the third son of a school watchman. In 1914 his family fled to Nizhny Shkaft (within Russia) from the approaching front of the First World War.

== Activism and imprisonment in West Belarus ==
In 1931 Pritytsky became Secretary of the youth branch (Komsomol) of the illegal Communist Party of West Belarus in Krynki in the Second Polish Republic. In 1932 he became member of the party and was elected secretary of the local party branch in Hrodna In 1933 Pritytsky was for the first time arrested by Polish authorities and imprisoned in Hrodna, but soon released.

Between 1933 and 1934 he was a member of the local committee of the CPWB Komsomol in Slonim and led strikes of forestry workers in the area. From 1934 to 1935 he studied at the CPWB school in the then-Soviet Byelorussian city of Minsk. In 1935 he became Secretary of the local youth branch of the CPWB in Slonim.

Pritytsky made a widely publicized unsuccessful assassination attempt on Polish agent provocateur Jakub Strelczuk in the Polish court at Vilnius on 27 January 1936, shooting from two Nagant revolvers. The operation was planned and organized by the leader of the West Belorussian Komsomol Mikalai Dvornikau, who also was the backup of the main executor. After the shooting, Pritytsky was arrested and sentenced to death. The death sentence provoked wide international protest in West Belarus, Poland, France, Czechoslovakia and the United States. Following the protests, the Polish authorities changed the sentence to life imprisonment.

In September 1939, after the Soviet invasion of Poland, Pritytsky was freed. He was elected into the People's Assembly of West Belarus and made a presentation demanding West Belarus to join the Soviet Union.

== Career in the Soviet Union ==
After the reunification of West Belarus with the Byelorussian SSR, in late 1939 Pritytsky was made deputy head of the executive committee of the newly established Belastok Region.

After Operation Barbarossa in June 1941, Pritytsky escaped to the eastern part of Belarus still under the Soviet control. In June–August 1941 he led the defense preparations around Mogilev and the creation of defense militia near Gomel.

Between 1942 and 1944 Pritytsky was Second Secretary of the Central Committee of the Byelorussian branch of the Komsomol. From 1944 to 1945 he was head of a pro-Soviet Polish partisan command staff. For his command of Polish partisans, he was awarded one of his Orders of the Red Banner.

After the end of the Second World War, Pritytsky became one of the most successful Soviet statesman from the ranks of the former West Belarusian pro-Soviet activists.

He served as the head of regional party branches in Grodno, Baranavichy, Maladzyechna and Minsk Regions. During his work, he organized collectivization of local agriculture. In the first post-war years, Pritytsky was close to being arrested under accusations of anti-Soviet espionage for Poland.

In the 1960s, Pritytsky has held senior posts in Soviet Belarus.

From 1962 to 1968 he was Secretary of the Central Committee of the Communist Party of Byelorussia and Deputy Head of the Government of Belarus.

From 1968 to 1971 Pritytsky was Head of Presidium of the Supreme Soviet of the Byelorussian Soviet Socialist Republic.

== In popular culture ==
- Vladimir Korsh-Sablin, a notable Belarusian Soviet director, filmed the movie "Red Leaves" (Belarusfilm, 1958) about Pritytsky's underground experience in Western Belarus.
- There are streets named after Pritytsky in Minsk, Hrodna, Maladziechna and Baranavichy (Vulica Prytyckaha).
- In Minsk, there two memorial plaques on the walls of the buildings where he lived.
- In 1978, the book "Life given to the people" was published, in which articles and speeches by Pritytsky, documents and memoirs about him were placed. It was opened with the introductory article "The People's Hero" by Pyotr Masherov.
