= Nadezhda Grekova =

Soviet Belarusian politician (1910–2001)

- Надзея Грэкава; Надежда Грекова
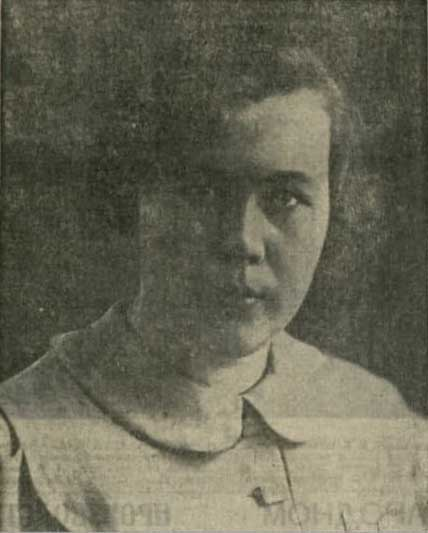
- Grekova in 1940

Chairman of the Supreme Soviet of Belarus
- In office 25 July 1938 – 12 March 1949
- Preceded by: Position established
- Succeeded by: Vasily Kozlov

Deputy Chairman of the Council of People's Commissars of the Byelorussian Soviet Socialist Republic
- In office 1943–1945

Secretary of CPSU in Kazan
- In office 1942–1943

Deputy Minister of Food Industry of the Soviet Union
- In office 1949–1952

Central Auditing Commission of the Communist Party of the Soviet Union
- In office 1939–1952

Member of The Supreme Soviet of the Soviet Union
- In office 1951–1955

Deputy and Head of the Industrial and Transport Department of the Central Committee of the Byelorussian SSR
- In office 1937–1940

3rd Secretary of the Central Committee of the Communist Party of Byelorussia
- In office 1938–1940

Minister of Food Industry of the Byelorussian SSR
- In office 1947–1955

Personal details
- Born: 17 September 1910 Minsk, Minsk Governorate, Russian Empire
- Died: 6 January 2001 (aged 90)
- Party: Communist Party of the Soviet Union
- Spouse: Mikhail Malinin
- Occupation: Politician; factory worker

Nadezhda Grigoryevna Grekova (Belarusian: Надзея Рыгораўна Грэкава, Russian: Надежда Григорьевна Грекова-Малинина; 17 September 1910 – 6 January 2001) was a Soviet Belarusian politician. She was Chairman of the Supreme Soviet of the Belorussian SSR from 1938 to 1949. At some point she was known as the "Iron Lady".

== Life ==
Grekova started to work in a textile factory in Minsk in 1922, at the age of twelve. In 1932, she became a member of the Communist Party of the Soviet Union, was elected chairperson of the local workers union in 1933. In 1937, at the age of twenty-seven, she was elected Deputy, and then Head of the Industrial and Transport Department of the Central Committee, and 3rd Secretary of the Central Committee of the Communist Party of Byelorussia. She held these positions until 1940.

From 25 July 1938 until 12 March 1949, she held the post of Chairman of the Supreme Soviet of the Belorussian SSR, one of the first women to hold such a position. She was only twenty-eight when elected to the position. The post was created after a re-organization of the system, and she was the first person elected to it. At the time, she had not yet completed her secondary education.

During the Occupation of Belarus by Nazi Germany, she was evacuated to Kazan. While in Kazan, she could not perform her duties as Chairman of The Supreme Soviet, but was elected as Secretary of the CPSU in Kazan in 1942–43. She was in Kazan from 28 June 1941 to 3 July 1944, and during this, while serving as Secretary of the Kazan CPSU, she was also Secretary of the Kazan City Committee of The CPSU. While there, she graduated from the Higher School of Party Organizers, under the Central Committee of the CPSU, completing her educational studies.

Nadezhda Grekova was a member of the Central Auditing Commission of the Communist Party of the Soviet Union from 1939 to 1952, Deputy Chairman of the Council of People's Commissars of the Byelorussian Soviet Socialist Republic in 1943–46. Deputy Minister of Food Industry of the Russian Socialist Federal Soviet Republic 1949–52, in addition, she was Minister of Food Industry of the Byelorussian Soviet Socialist Republic. From 1946 to 1955, she was a member of the Supreme Soviet of The Soviet Union.

She was awarded two Orders of Lenin, Order of the Patriotic War, First Class, Order of the Red Banner, the Order of the Badge of Honor and other medals.

In her private life, she was married to general Mikhail Malinin. It is alleged that the two of them were introduced to one another by Stalin.

== Legacy ==
In 2002, a park in Minsk was named after her. As well, there is a museum dedicated to her.
