= Pyotr Masherov =

Soviet Belarusian resistance leader and politician (1919-1980)

- Пётр Машэраў
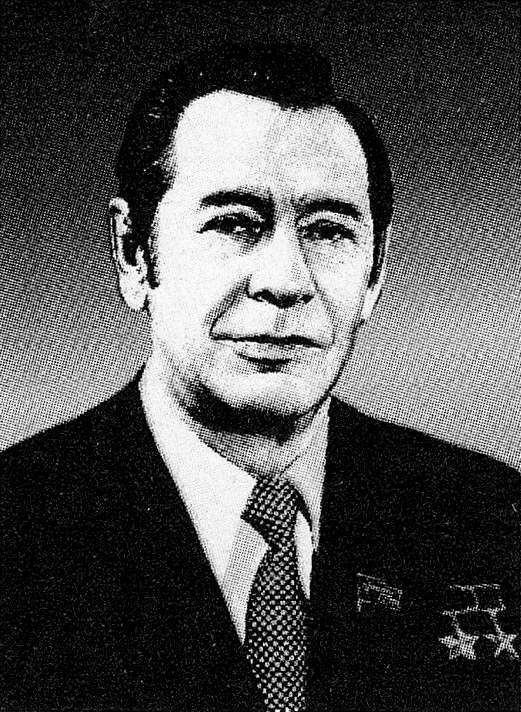
- Masherov as shown on a 1996 stamp

First Secretary of the Communist Party of Byelorussia
- In office 30 March 1965 – 4 October 1980
- Head of state: Vasily Kozlov; Valentina Klochkova (acting); Sergey Pritytsky; Ivan Klimov (acting); Fyodor Surganov; Vladimir Lobanok (acting); Zinaida Bychkovskaya (acting); Ivan Paliakoŭ
- Head of government: Tikhon Kiselyov; Aleksandr Aksyonov
- Preceded by: Kirill Mazurov
- Succeeded by: Vladimir Brovikov (acting); Tikhon Kiselyov

Candidate member of the 23rd, 24th, 25th Politburo
- In office 8 April 1966 – 4 October 1980

Personal details
- Born: Piatro Mironavič Mašera; 26 February 1919 Shirki, Socialist Soviet Republic of Lithuania and Belorussia (now Belarus)
- Died: 4 October 1980 (aged 61) Smoleviči, Byelorussian SSR, Soviet Union
- Resting place: Eastern Cemetery, Minsk
- Party: Communist Party of the Soviet Union (1943–1980)
- Other political affiliations: Communist Party of Byelorussia
- Spouse: Polina Andreyevna
- Children: 2
- Profession: Teacher, civil servant

Military service
- Allegiance: Soviet Union
- Branch/service: Red Army; Soviet partisans
- Years of service: 1941–1945
- Rank: Major general
- Battles/wars: World War II; Belarusian partisan movement
- Pyotr Masherov's voice Masherov at the Second All-Union Conference of Peace Champions; Recorded 1952

Pyotr Mironovich Masherov (Note: Belarusian: Пётр Міронавіч Машэраў, romanized: Piotr Mironavič Mašeraŭ Taraškievica orthography: Пётар Міронавіч Машэраў, romanized: Piotar Mironavič Mašeraŭ Russian: Пётр Миронович Машеров) (né Mashero; (Note: Belarusian: Машэра, romanized: Mašera Russian: Машеро) 26 February [O.S. 13 February] 1919 – 4 October 1980) was a Soviet partisan, statesman, and one of the leaders of the Belarusian resistance during World War II who governed the Byelorussian Soviet Socialist Republic as First Secretary of the Communist Party of Byelorussia from 1965 until his death in 1980. Under Masherov's rule, Belarus was transformed from an agrarian, undeveloped nation which had not yet recovered from the Second World War into an industrial powerhouse; Minsk, the capital and largest city of Belarus, became one of the fastest-growing cities on the planet. Masherov ruled until his sudden death in 1980, after his vehicle was hit by a potato truck.

Born to a peasant family in what is today the Vitebsk Region during the early stages of the Russian Civil War, Masherov was a teacher in mathematics and physics in his youth. Following his father's arrest and death during the Great Purge, Masherov joined the Red Army following the beginning of Operation Barbarossa, and rose to the rank of major general. With the end of the Second World War, Masherov turned to politics; becoming First Secretary of the Brest Regional Committee in 1955 and First Secretary of the Communist Party of Byelorussia ten years later.

Masherov was known for his down-to-earth demeanour and for his humility, separating him from much of the rest of the upper echelons of Soviet government during the Era of Stagnation, a time period in which corruption and resistance to reform ran rampant. Masherov was closely affiliated with reformists in the Soviet Union such as Alexei Kosygin, and was prior to his death considered a possible successor to Yuri Andropov in the case that he were to succeed Leonid Brezhnev as General Secretary of the Communist Party of the Soviet Union.

== Early life and career ==
=== Birth ===
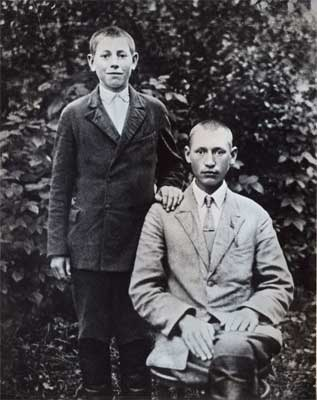
Masherov (left) with his brother Pavel, 1930s

Pyotr Mironovich Mashero was born on 26 February 1919 in the village of Shirki, Sennensky Uyezd, in the Socialist Soviet Republic of Lithuania and Belorussia. According to family legend his great-grandfather was a soldier in the army of Napoleon who settled in modern-day Belarus rather than returning to France. Pyotr's father was Miron Vasilyevich Mashero and his mother was Daria Petrovna Lyakhovskaya. Pyotr had seven siblings, of whom four survived to adulthood.

=== Education ===
Masherov's education was troublesome; though he graduated primary school, he originally only received a partial secondary education. He had to walk 18 kilometres (roughly 11 miles) to and from school, on homemade skis during the winter. During weekends, Masherov, as well as his father Miron and his brother Pavel, worked part-time jobs loading logs into railway cars.

According to the memoirs of Masherov's sister Olga, during the early 1930s the family lived hand-to-mouth, both due to harsh weather conditions and incompetency on the recently formed kolkhoz. The Mashero family was assisted by Pyotr's sister Matryona, who lived in Vitebsk and transferred bread and sugar to Shirki.

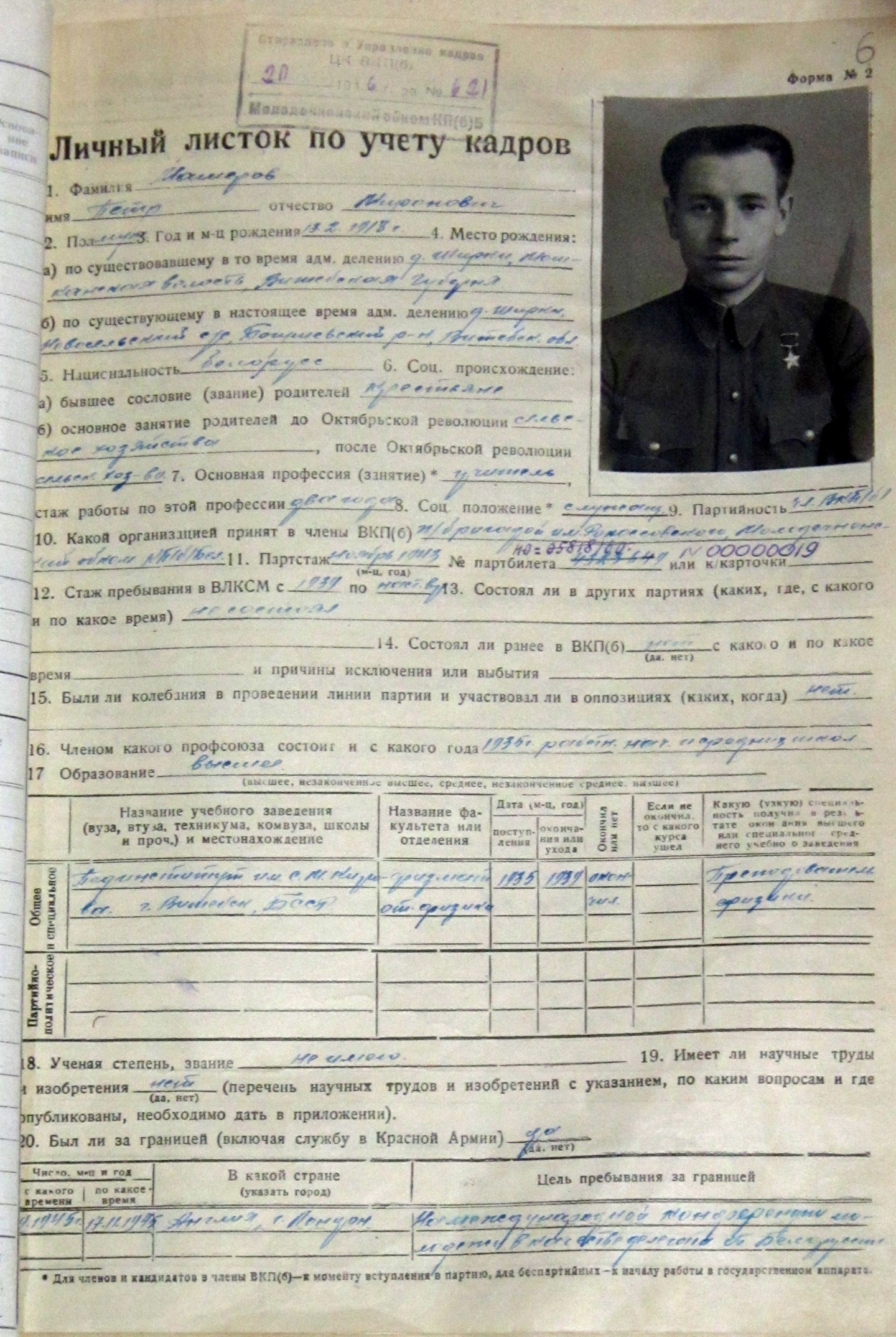
Masherov's personnel sheet, c. 1946

In 1933 Masherov moved to Dvorishche, in Rasony District, where his older brother Pavel was a teacher in history and geography. Returning to school, he completed secondary education in 1934 and went to the Vitebsk State University where he studied to be a teacher in physics and mathematics. He was very active in sports during his studies, participating in both skiing and skating. Masherov graduated in 1939 and became a teacher the same year.

Tragedy struck the family in 1937, when Miron was arrested on charges of "anti-Soviet agitation" and sentenced to ten years of corrective labour during the Great Purge. He died shortly afterwards. He would later be rehabilitated for lack of evidence, but Pyotr and Pavel were forced to become the family's breadwinners.

From 1939 until 1941, Masherov worked as a teacher of physics and mathematics at the secondary school in Rasony. He proved to be popular among the students and was respected in the area. Masherov also supervised the work of the school's drama circle and would even star in some plays, such as Alexander Ostrovsky's The Forest.

== Second World War ==
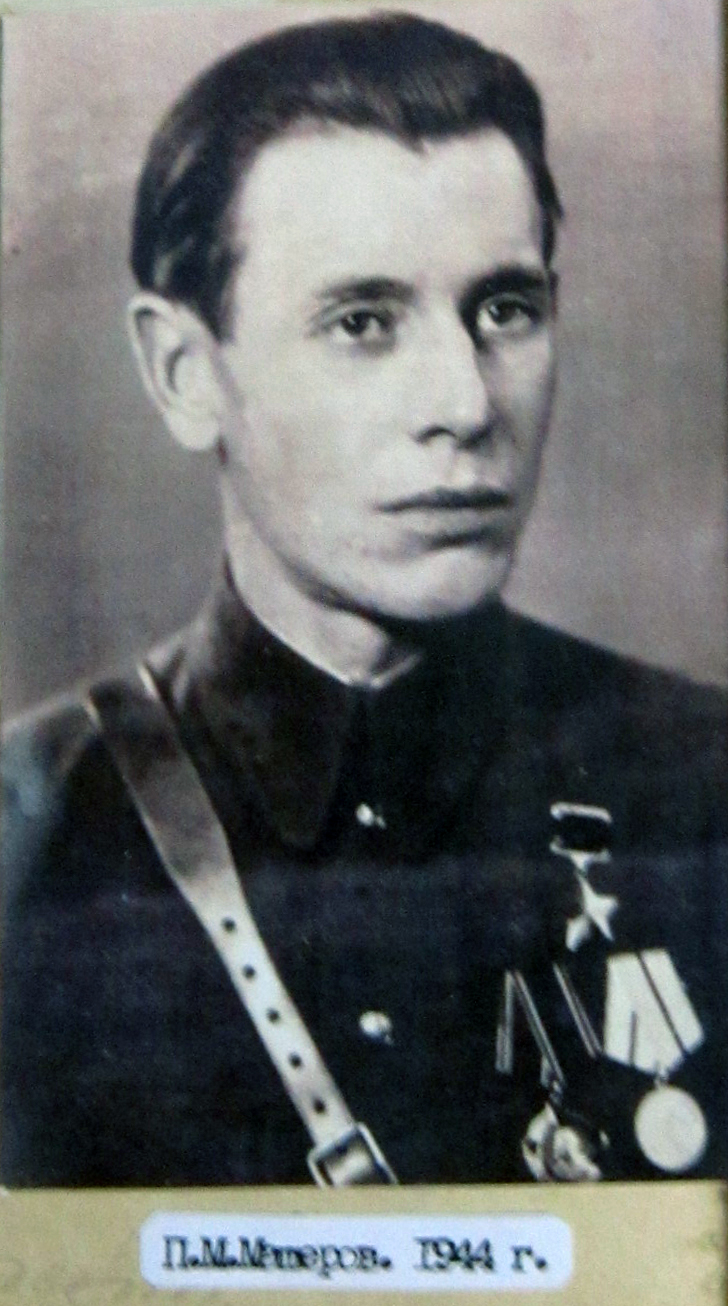
Masherov in his military uniform in 1944

In 1941, with the beginning of Operation Barbarossa, Masherov volunteered to join the Red Army. Shortly afterwards, in August 1941, he was captured during fighting near Nevel and taken aboard a prisoner train. Masherov escaped captivity after jumping out of the train while it was moving through Rasony district, suffering bruises and scratches, and walked to Rasony, where he remained.

Following his escape, Masherov began forming the Komsomol underground in Rasony, an early part of what would later grow into the Belarusian resistance during World War II. From December 1941 to March 1942, he continued his work on the kolkhoz, as well as his teaching activities, while at the same time organising the partisans in Rasony. In this time period, the partisans recruited supporters and gathered equipment. One of their caches was at the dentist's office in Rasony; the dentist was Polina Galanova, who would later become Masherov's wife. Using the nickname of Dubnyak, Masherov was one of the leaders of the Belarusian partisan movement. Starting in April 1942, Masherov was commander of the N. A. Shchors partisan detachment. He was elected as leader by the partisans, a move later agreed to by the Central Headquarters of the Partisan Movement. As commander, he declared one of his former students the detachment's chief of staff. In the first battle involving the detachment, Masherov was wounded and chose to recover in the apartment of one of his former students, despite the objections of his fellow soldiers.

He would be wounded another time and became a member of the Communist Party of the Soviet Union in the summer of 1943, while at the front. Around the same time, he was promoted to commissar of the Konstantin Rokossovsky Partisan Brigade, leading the brigade as it relocated to Vileyka. In September 1943, Masherov was promoted yet again, this time to the position of First Secretary of the Vileyka Underground Regional Committee of the Komsomol. In 1944, Masherov was awarded the title of Hero of the Soviet Union for his services as the "first organiser of the partisan movement in the Rasony district of the Vitebsk Region, which later grew into a popular uprising and created a huge partisan land of 10 thousand square kilometres".

== Post-war activities ==
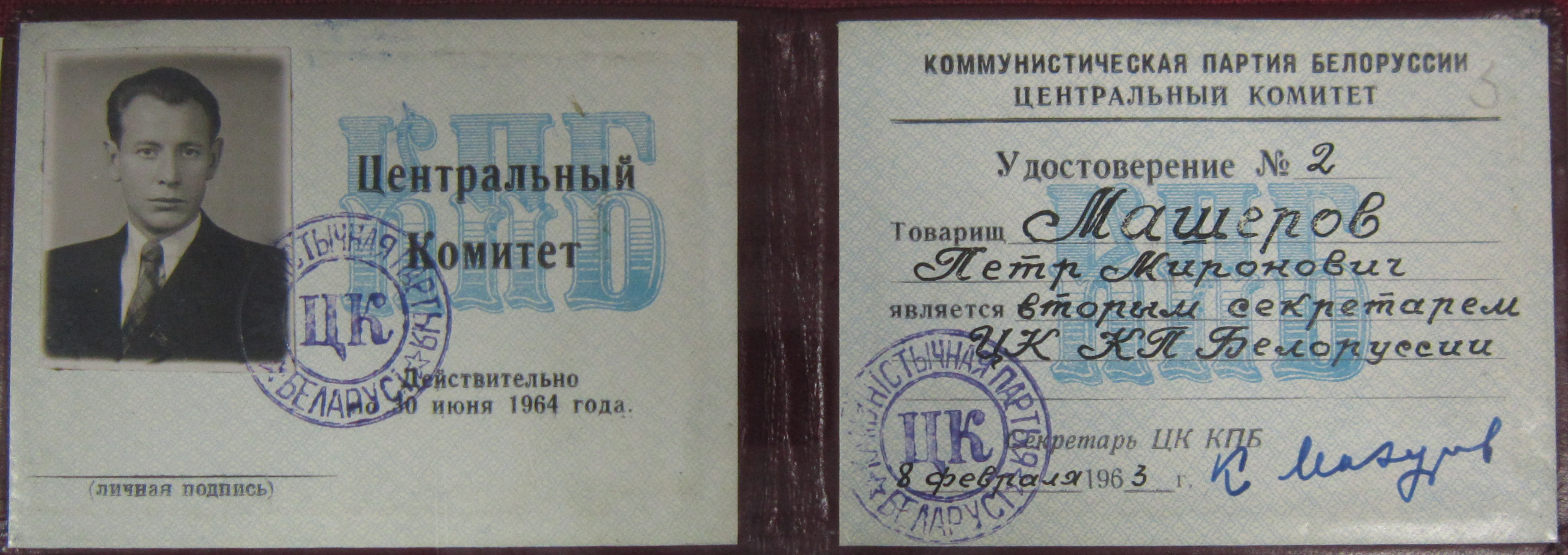
Masherov's party membership card as Second Secretary of the Communist Party of Belarus, 1963

Following the end of the war, Masherov turned to politics within the Komsomol; from July 1944 he served as First Secretary of both the Molodechno and Minsk regions, and in October 1947, Masherov was declared First Secretary of the Komsomol of the Byelorussian SSR. According to the memoirs of Vladimir Velichko, who served as personal assistant to Masherov in the 1970s, Masherov participated in both the reconstruction of Molodechno and campaigns against the cursed soldiers of the Polish Home Army.

It was not long before Masherov turned from the Komsomol to the CPB. The move was allegedly the suggestion of then-First Secretary of the CPB Nikolai Patolichev, who was impressed by Masherov's activities as head of the Komsomol in Belarus. On 1 August 1955, Masherov was elected as First Secretary of the Brest Regional Committee of the CPB.

In Brest, Masherov's activities were similar to what he would later do as First Secretary of the CPB; money was invested into the advancement of mechanical engineering and both a museum and memorial complex were created to memorialise the defense of Brest Fortress. Development in Brest rapidly accelerated and additional focus was placed on traditional Belarusian culture, with funds being invested in the purchase of Belarusian musical instruments and literature. In Brest, Masherov lived in what had formerly been the house of a deputy of the Polish Sejm, and usually walked to his office without security. Belarusian cosmonaut Pyotr Klimuk recalled that Masherov was held in high regard in the Brest Region while he served as First Secretary of the Regional Committee.

== First Secretary of the CPB (1965–1980) ==
Masherov had been Second Secretary of the CPB under Kirill Mazurov since 1962. Therefore, when Mazurov retired from his position as First Secretary to become First Deputy Premier of the Soviet Union in 1965 it was logical for Masherov to succeed him. However, the Soviet government put forward Tikhon Kiselyov as a possible successor to Mazurov. This effort fell flat when Masherov's allies within the CPB (most of whom were former partisans) backed him up, and he was appointed as First Secretary on 30 March 1965.

=== Industrialisation ===
Masherov's primary policy as First Secretary of the CPB was expansion of Belarusian industry. Coming into office the same year as the 1965 Soviet economic reform (popularly known as the Kosygin reform), Masherov established himself as one of its supporters and enacted it in Belarus. Uniquely among the SSRs, there were frequently public discussions on the economic situation in Belarus, including openly stating issues with the economy.

While Masherov was in power numerous enterprises came into existence, including Grodno Azot and chemical plants in Novopolotsk and Gomel. One of the most well-known hallmarks of Masherov's time as First Secretary was the construction of the Minsk Metro; Gosplan originally intended to build a metro in Novosibirsk (plans which would eventually come to fruition in 1986). However, Masherov wrote to Brezhnev (or Kosygin, according to some accounts), and eventually received support for the construction of a metro in Minsk, in the process working his former rival Kiselyov.

Masherov did much as First Secretary to modernise Minsk, the nation's capital. He pursued a rapid modernisation of the city, in the process destroying much of the original town which had survived the Second World War. He would later state that he regretted doing this and wished that it had been possible to create something similar to Warsaw Old Town on Niamiha Street. The Minsk Sports Palace was built, and Dinamo Stadium was renovated for the 1980 Summer Olympics. The Vileyka-Minsk water system was built as well, providing running water to most of Minsk.

=== Agricultural reforms ===
Under Masherov's rule, the Belarusian agricultural industry, which had typically been at the forefront of the economy, expanded far beyond its traditional production levels. Masherov took power with the ambitious goal of expanding the Belarusian grain harvest from the 2.3 million tons it had been producing to 9-10 million tons, stating that Belarus would need to feed itself, as well as other republics within the Soviet Union. His efforts proved moderately successful; by 1977 the grain harvest had increased to 7.3 million tons.

Masherov raised eyebrows in 1974 when he appointed biologist Viktor Shevelukha as secretary of agriculture in the Central Committee of the CPB. Though Shevelukha was known at the time as a devoted socialist and was a member of the CPSU, he was not a politician, as many appointments were at the time, but a professional in the agricultural field. Many of Masherov's other appointments regarding such matters were also professionals rather than politicians. This happened largely due to the enthusiastic support of Fyodor Kulakov, who was Secretary of the Central Committee's Agricultural Department; the agreement of the Central Committee was required for any appointments who were not already party officials.

=== Educational policy ===
With a background as a teacher, Masherov was immensely interested in the education of Belarusians, especially in sciences. Masherov worked with scientists from across the USSR, including Nikolai Borisevich (President of the Academy of Scientists of the Byelorussian SSR), Mstislav Keldysh, Anatoly Alexandrov, Borys Paton, Alexander Prokhorov, Nikolay Basov, and Nikita Moiseyev, among others. Masherov worked tirelessly to get up-to-date equipment for institutes, including notably purchasing the first echocardiography machine in the BSSR for the Cardiography Research Institute.

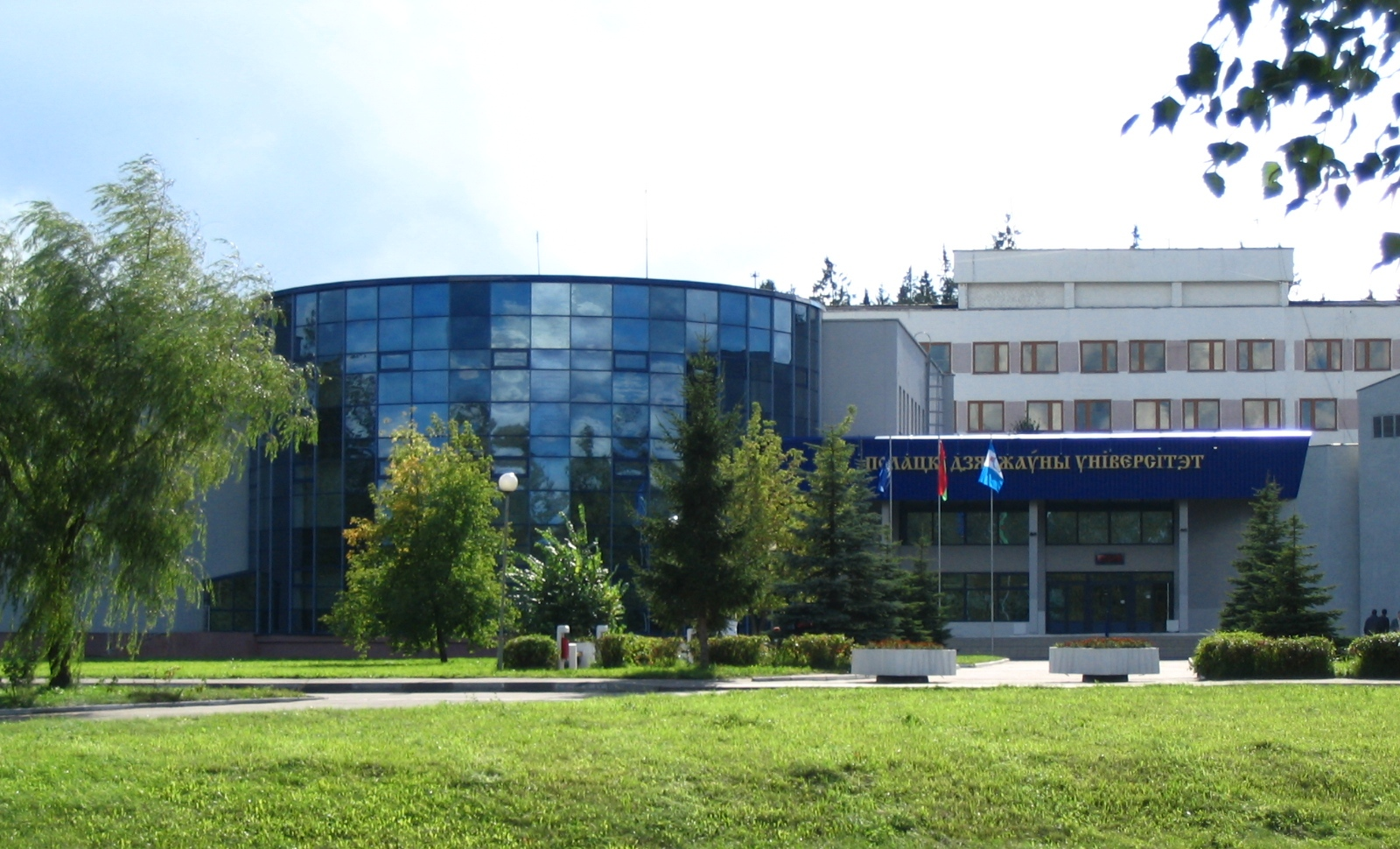
Polotsk State University, one of the universities constructed under Masherov's leadership, pictured in 2004

Masherov also promoted the expansion of educational institutions; the Brest State Technical University, the Pavel Sukhoi State Technical University of Gomel, the Belarusian State University of Culture and Arts, and Polotsk State University were all constructed by Masherov's government. In regards to vocational education he brought in comprehensive measures to both improve the quality of education and decrease juvenile delinquency and took inspiration from Anton Makarenko in expanding education at youth detention centres. Masherov also supported increased teaching of foreign languages as well as education on Belarusian culture.

Masherov retained good relations with the Komsomol as First Secretary; it was on his initiative that the BSSR's Komsomol school was opened, as one of the first in the Soviet Union. However, on the other hand he also strongly criticised the widespread practise of many Belarusians (up to 100,000 annually) leaving the BSSR to work on Komsomol construction projects; many of these workers would not return, resulting in what Masherov termed a "demographic crisis".

=== War memorialisation ===
As First Secretary and a former partisan leader, Masherov supported a policy of memorialising the Second World War and Belarusian partisans. Under Masherov's rule, numerous monuments to the partisans were constructed, such as the Mound of Glory, the memorial to the Khatyn massacre, and the Breakthrough monument. According to Zair Azgur, Masherov himself drafted the first design of the Mound of Glory. Masherov was also responsible for making the Belarusian contributions to the Soviet war effort more well-known across the Soviet Union. He successfully pushed for Brest Fortress and Minsk to be awarded the title of Hero City despite reservations from Soviet leadership.

=== Consideration for promotion ===
Masherov was mentioned as a possible candidate for multiple positions within the Soviet government. Prior to his death he was a candidate member of the Politburo, and it has been stated by some such as the Washington Post that he intended to become Premier following the death of his mentor, Kosygin. More radically, it has been suggested by Moskovskij Komsomolets that Masherov was intended to be a possible successor to Brezhnev as General Secretary of the CPSU, backed up by a reformist "Komsomol Group" which also included Mikhail Zimyanin. The alleged group was opposed to the Dnipropetrovsk Mafia, Brezhnev's clique within the CPSU. Such a claim was also supported by a 1977 CIA report which cast Masherov as a leading member of a "Belorussian Faction" which Brezhnev viewed as a serious threat to his rule. However, others have disputed this, including Masherov's sister Olga, who has said that Brezhnev and Masherov maintained an amicable personal and political relationship.

=== Conflicts with Soviet leadership ===
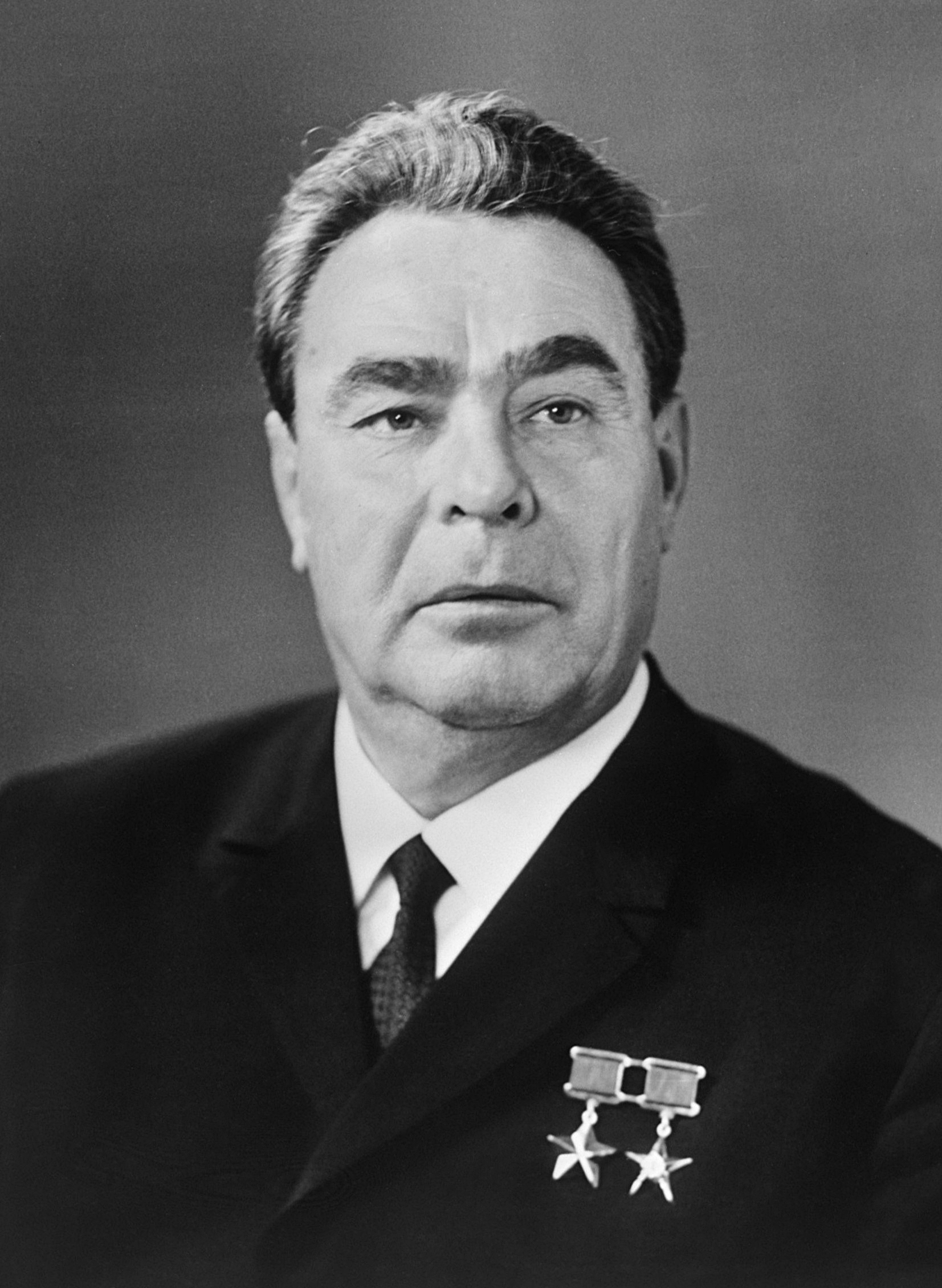
Leonid Brezhnev

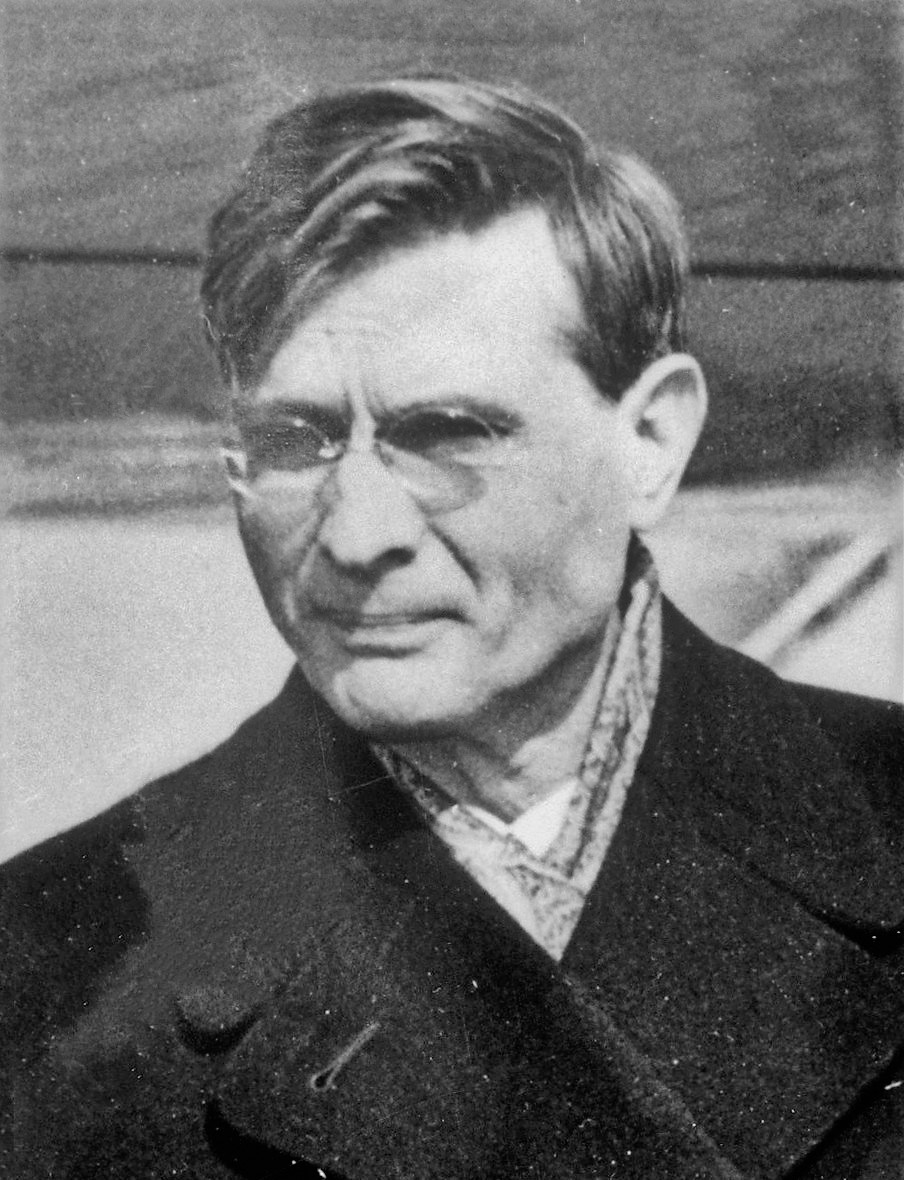
Mikhail Suslov

As an independent thinker, Masherov set himself apart from many others within the CPSU at the time. While many of his compatriots chose to closely adhere to the positions of Soviet leader Leonid Brezhnev, Masherov instead pursued his own course, developing Belarus and frequently acting without seeking guidance from Moscow. Masherov's relationship with Brezhnev has been subject to wildly varying accounts, with some, such as Olga Masherova, stating that Brezhnev was hopeful that Masherov would achieve higher office. Others, like Viktor Shevelukha, claim that the vain Brezhnev was envious of Masherov, who was genuinely loved by the Belarusian people, something Brezhnev could not replicate at the national level.

Masherov had a complicated relationship with Mikhail Suslov, Second Secretary of the CPSU and the party's primary ideologue. Suslov allegedly sabotaged Masherov's attempts to move upwards by inviting him to the 24th Congress of the CPSU in 1971 and requesting that he give a speech criticising Eurocommunism. This was despite the attendance of Eurocommunist politicians, including Georges Marchais and Dolores Ibárruri (head of the French Communist Party and honorary president of the Spanish Communist Party respectively), and caused a diplomatic incident which dealt a serious blow to any further political aspirations of Masherov. However, according to a 1977 CIA report, Masherov, as well as his political allies Mazurov and Zimyanin, had backing from Suslov, as well as Premier Alexei Kosygin, in opposition to the establishment of Brezhnev's cult of personality.

== Death ==
On the evening of 4 October 1980, Masherov left the building of the Central Committee of the Communist Party of Byelorussia, going to Zhodzina. Due to flaws which had been found in the ZIL which Masherov typically rode in, he instead elected to ride in the GAZ-13 which had been the vehicle driven previously. During the ride, Masherov was sitting in the front passenger seat and a security officer was sitting in the back seat. Near Smalyavichy, Masherov's vehicle suffered a head-on collision with a potato truck. Everyone in the GAZ-13 was instantly killed while the truck driver suffered severe injuries and was hospitalised. The Procurator General of the Soviet Union and the KGB conducted an investigation into the incident and found it to be an accident; the driver of the potato truck, Nikolai Pustovit, was declared guilty of a traffic safety violation resulting in the deaths of two or more people and sentenced to 15 years of hard labour. However, in 1982, Pustovit's sentence was reduced as part of a general amnesty, and in 1985 he was released.

Masherov's funeral was held on 8 October 1980, in Minsk. Tens of thousands of Minsk residents were in attendance, but Mikhail Zimyanin and Petras Griškevičius were the only high-ranking Soviet officials present following an instruction from the government banning any members of the Communist Party of the Soviet Union from attending.

=== Conspiracy theories ===
Conspiracy theories exist regarding Masherov's death and the alleged role played by Soviet politicians. According to these theories, Masherov was killed on the orders of the higher echelons of Soviet power out of fear of him rising in the ranks. The chief organiser of the conspiracy often varies, but Yuri Andropov is most commonly accused. Multiple members of the Belarusian democracy movement, including former Prime Minister Vyacheslav Kebich (whose political rise was supported by Masherov) and Natalia Masherova (Masherov's daughter) have both stated their belief that Masherov was assassinated.

== Legacy ==
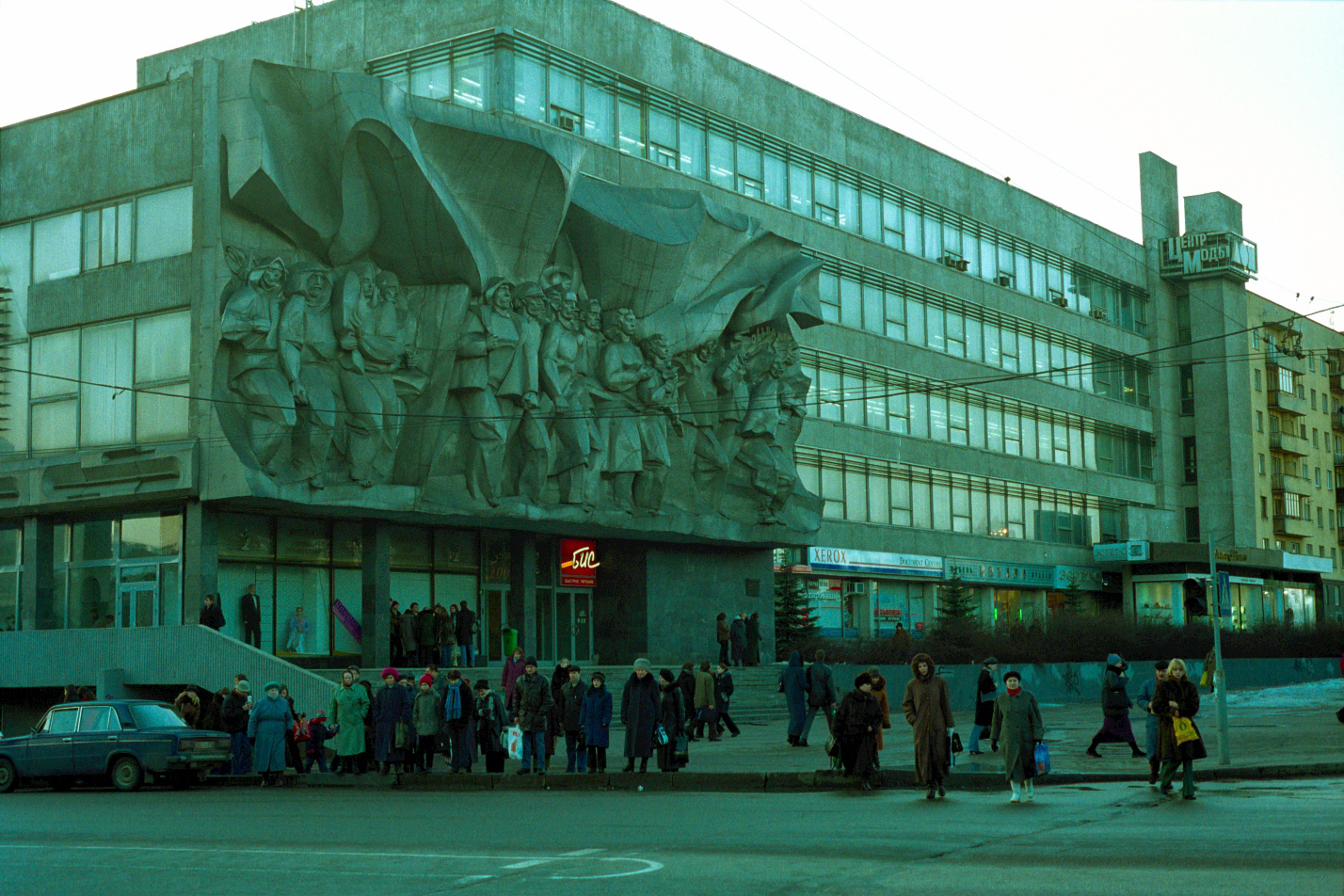
Masherov Avenue (since 2005 Victors Avenue), pictured here in 2006, was named after Masherov following his death in 1980

Masherov's legacy has been profoundly felt in Belarus, owing to the economic reforms begun under his leadership, as well as recognition of the Second World War's impact on Belarusian society. Masherov was responsible for the construction of the monument to the Khatyn massacre, the Mound of Glory and the Minsk Metro. Masherov also supported the production of Elem Klimov's film Come and See, overruling lower functionaries who had rejected Klimov's proposal and personally greenlighting filming.

Following Masherov's death, the newly created Masherov Avenue in Minsk was named in his honour before being changed in 2005 to its present name, Victors Avenue. In 2018 the Belarusian Left Party "A Just World" proposed renaming the Minsk Metro in Masherov's honour, explaining that it was due to his persistence that the metro was constructed.

=== Popular Culture ===
A picture of Masherov along with Konstantin Chernenko can be seen in the 1982 movie Firefox.

=== Russification ===
Among the most significant controversies regarding Masherov's rule and legacy is what role he played in the Russification of Belarus, with particular attention being paid to the decline of Belarusian-language education and respective increase of Russian-language teaching. While both those who view him as having perpetuated Russification and those who oppose such a view agree that he was not a supporter of Russian nationalism, those with a more critical view note that his rule was marked by increased centralisation of power and the growth of the Russian language in Belarusian society. Belarusian journalist and pro-democratic politician Siarhei Navumchyk has credited this growth to Masherov's status as a "sincere communist" who believed in cultural integration, and notes that while he does not lack responsibility for advancing Russification, the process began under Kirill Mazurov. More critically, journalist Vital Cyhankoŭ has described Masherov as being "first place" among republican-level leaders in advancing Russification. Conversely, Cyhankoŭ also notes that Masherov worked to protect and strengthen the position of Belarusian-language literature within the Soviet Union.

Historian Natalya Chernyshova, while presenting Masherov's decision to limit Belarusian-language education in a critical light, has argued that his background as a part of the peasantry influenced him to switch from Belarusian to Russian, reflecting his status as "the ultimate model of upward social mobility" in Belarus. Similarly to Cyhankoŭ, Chernyshova notes the divergences between Masherov's positions on education and on literature, noting his support for the Union of Belarusian Writers and his efforts to have writers Yanka Kupala, Yakub Kolas, and Maksim Bahdanovič publicly memorialised at what he felt was significant political risk. Dissident writer Aliaksei Karpiuk, who was expelled from the Communist Party for his criticism of local officials, similarly credited Masherov with restoring his party membership and fighting the central Soviet government's targeting of both Karpiuk himself and fellow writer Vasil Bykaŭ.

== Family and personal life ==
Masherov was known for his welcoming demeanour and willingness to help others; western diplomats who had met him described him as "urbane and intelligent". He enjoyed ballet and theatre, and often visited performances. He also enjoyed reading, banya, and association football; he interrupted his vacation on the Black Sea to watch the 1980 Summer Olympics' qualifying matches for football, which were held in Minsk. Masherov was known to visit Białowieża Forest frequently, and was fond of flying; he flew 104 times in 1978 alone. Flights with Masherov began very early in the morning, typically around 4:00, and would last the entire day with many stops.

During the late 1970s, Masherov needed to have a kidney removed. It was originally desired that the operation be carried out in Minsk, but at the insistence of his wife it was carried out in Moscow instead, as she felt that it would be safer there. According to his personal physician, Nikolai Manak, Masherov did not drink, but smoked often, and suffered from high blood pressure due to stress.

Masherov's older brother Pavel became a major general during the Second World War and was part of the Soviet occupation force during the Allied occupation of Austria. Masherov's eldest daughter Natalia Masherova later entered politics in an independent Belarus, serving as a member of the House of Representatives. She also ran in the 2001 Belarusian presidential election and placed well in polls, but withdrew following a tirade against her by incumbent president Alexander Lukashenko, saying that she did not intend for her campaign to become "confrontational".

== Honours and awards ==
- Hero of the Soviet Union
- Hero of Socialist Labour
- Seven Orders of Lenin
- Jubilee Medal "In Commemoration of the 100th Anniversary of the Birth of Vladimir Ilyich Lenin"
- Medal "To a Partisan of the Patriotic War" 1st class
- Medal "For the Victory over Germany in the Great Patriotic War 1941–1945"
- Jubilee Medal "Twenty Years of Victory in the Great Patriotic War 1941–1945"
- Jubilee Medal "Thirty Years of Victory in the Great Patriotic War 1941–1945"
- Medal "For the Development of Virgin Lands"
- Jubilee Medal "50 Years of the Armed Forces of the USSR"
- Jubilee Medal "60 Years of the Armed Forces of the USSR"
- Jubilee Medal "50 Years of the Soviet Militia"
- Order of Georgi Dimitrov (Bulgaria)
