= Kirill Mazurov =

Soviet Belarusian resistance leader and politician (1914–1989)

- Кірыла Мазураў; Кирилл Мазуров
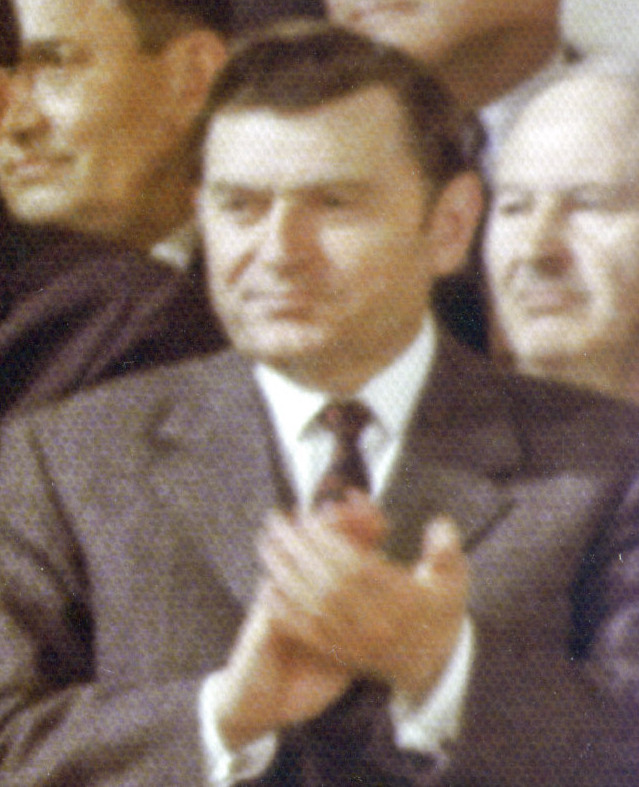
- Mazurov in 1972

First Deputy Chairman of the Council of Ministers of the Soviet Union
- In office 26 March 1965 – 28 November 1978
- Premier: Alexei Kosygin
- Preceded by: Dmitriy Ustinov
- Succeeded by: Dmitry Polyansky

First Secretary of the Communist Party of Byelorussia
- In office 28 July 1956 – 30 March 1965
- Head of state: Vasily Kozlov
- Head of government: Himself; Nikolai Avkhimovich; Tikhon Kiselyov
- Preceded by: Nikolai Patolichev
- Succeeded by: Pyotr Masherov

Chairman of the Council of Ministers of the Byelorussian SSR (Head of government of the Byelorussian SSR)
- In office 24 July 1953 – 28 July 1958
- Leader: Nikolai Patolichev himself
- Head of state: Vasily Kozlov
- Preceded by: Aleksey Kleshchev
- Succeeded by: Nikolay Avkhimovich

Full member of the 22nd, 23rd, 24th, 25th Politburo
- In office 26 March 1965 – 28 November 1978

Candidate member of the 20th, 22nd Presidium
- In office 29 June 1957 – 26 March 1965

Personal details
- Born: 25 March 1914 Rudnia-Pribytkovskaya, Russian Empire
- Died: 19 December 1989 (aged 75) Moscow, Soviet Union
- Party: Communist Party of the Soviet Union (1940–1989)

Kirill Trofimovich Mazurov (Belarusian: Кіры́ла Трафі́мавіч Ма́зураў, romanized: Kiryła Trafimavič Mazuraŭ, Russian: Кири́лл Трофи́мович Ма́зуров; 25 March 1914 – 19 December 1989) was a Soviet partisan, politician, and one of the leaders of the Belarusian resistance during World War II who governed the Byelorussian Soviet Socialist Republic as First Secretary of the Communist Party of Byelorussia from 1956 until 1965, when he became a member of the Politburo of the CPSU.

== Political career ==
Kirill Mazurov was born in 1914 in the Mogilev Governorate of the Russian Empire in a Belarusian peasant family. He was originally a construction technician, and graduated from the Gomel highway technical school in 1933. He joined the Communist Party of the Soviet Union in 1940 and the Red Army in 1941. During the Great Patriotic War, he participated in military actions as a political instructor, a battalion commander and an instructor of the army's political department.

Mazurov left the army in 1942 to become secretary of the central committee of the Belarusian Komsomol. Mazurov then moved to a Soviet partisan unit where he became president of the central staff.

After the war, Mazurov returned to his position as secretary of the Belarusian Komsomol. In 1947 he joined the apparatus of the Communist Party of Byelorussia. From 1949 to 1950 he was the First Secretary of the Minsk city committee and from 1950 to 1953 first secretary of the Minsk regional committee of the Communist Party of Byelorussia. From 1950 to 1979, he was a deputy of the Supreme Soviet of the Soviet Union. After Joseph Stalin's death, he actively supported Nikita Khrushchev. He was chairman of the council of ministers of BSSR (1953–1965), then First Secretary of the Communist Party of Byelorussia (1956–1965). In 1964 he was appointed candidate member of the Politburo of the CPSU Central Committee and was then a full member from 26 March 1965 to 27 November 1978. He was also the First Deputy Chairman of the Council of Ministers (1965–1976).

Mazurov retired in 1978.

In 1989, he gave an interview to Izvestia in which he said he was the envoy of Brezhnev who commanded the Warsaw Pact invasion force in Czechoslovakia in 1968 under the code name "General Trofymov". He said he regretted his action, added "today I would not accept to guide one similar operation" and asked the Czechs to forgive the Soviets.

== Decorations ==
He was awarded the Order of Lenin five times, the Order of the Red Banner, the Order of the Patriotic War 1st Class and was a Hero of Socialist Labor in 1974. He received other military medals as well.
