= Alexander Krinitsky =

Soviet politician (1894–1937)

- Александр Криницкий
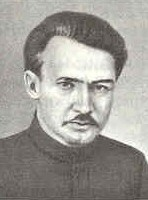

First Secretary of the Communist Party of Byelorussia
- In office September 1924 – 7 May 1927
- Preceded by: Aleksandr Osatkin-Vladimirsky
- Succeeded by: Vilhelm Knorin

Head of the Propaganda and Agitation Department of the Central Committee
- In office 7 April 1924 – 3 December 1925
- Preceded by: Vilhelm Knorin
- Succeeded by: Aleksei Stetskii

Personal details
- Born: 9 September 1894 Tver, Russian Empire
- Died: 30 October 1937 (aged 43) Moscow, Russian SFSR, Soviet Union
- Party: RSDLP (Bolsheviks) (1915–1918); Russian Communist Party (1918–1937)

Alexander Ivanovich Krinitsky (Russian: Алекса́ндр Ива́нович Крини́цкий; 9 September 1894 – 30 October 1937) was a Soviet politician who was First Secretary of the Communist Party of Byelorussia from May 1924 to December 1925.

== Early life and Revolution ==
Born in Tver, he was the eldest son in the family of an employee of the provincial chancellery. He graduated from the Tver gymnasium with a gold medal (1912).

He studied at the St. Petersburg Polytechnic Institute in 1912 however he did not graduate. He later studied at the Physics and Mathematics Faculty of Moscow University.

In 1915 Krinitsky he joined the Bolsheviks and fomented propaganda and agitation among students of Moscow University, from which he was expelled. He was then arrested in 1915 and sentenced to eternal settlement in Eastern Siberia. But on 6 (19) March 1917, he was amnestied and released. After his release, he was actively involved in revolutionary work.

== In the Soviet Union ==
From September 1924 to May 1927 in the Byelorussian SSR: First – a Secretary and since December 1925 the 1st Secretary of the Communist Party of Byelorussia (Bolsheviks). In Belarus, Krinitsky, as a typical representative of the party elite, implemented the idea of strengthening the USSR as a single highly centralized union state, commanding and administratively managing the economy, and a complete monopoly on the power of the Communist Party. At the same time, he was influenced by the strength in the 1920s local nation-oriented wing of the Communist Party of Byelorussia.

From May 1927 he was head of the Propaganda Department of the Central Committee of the All-Union Communist Party (Agitprop). From 1929 he was secretary of the Transcaucasian Regional Committee of the UCP (b), then deputy people's commissar of the RSI USSR, also a member of the editorial board of the magazine "Bolshevik". He was deputy head of the agricultural department (b), since 1933 – Head of the Political Department and Deputy People's Commissar of the USSR and Secretary of the Saratov Regional Committee of the Party.

During the Great Purge, he was arrested on 20 July 1937, removed from the Central Committee and Orgburo on 12 October 1937, sentenced to death on 29 October 1937 and executed the next day.

Krinitsky was rehabilitated on 17 March 1956.
