= Vilhelm Knorin =

Latvian revolutionary and historian (1890-1939)

- Вильгельм Кнорин; Vilhelms Knoriņš
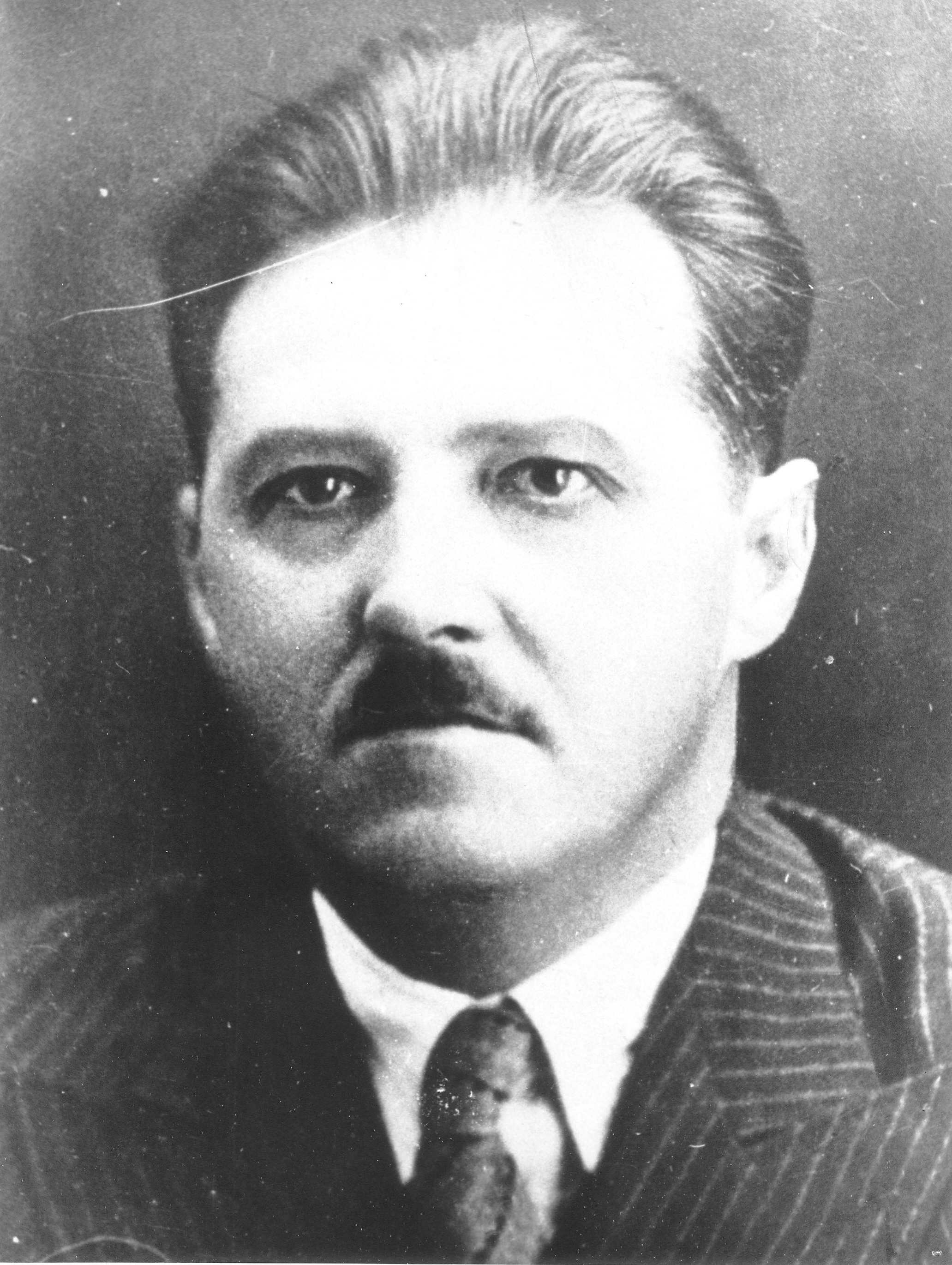
- Knorin in 1937

First Secretary of the Communist Party of Byelorussia
- In office 7 May 1927 – 4 December 1928
- Preceded by: Vincas Mickevičius-Kapsukas
- Succeeded by: Aleksandr Osatkin-Vladimirsky
- In office 25 November 1920 – May 1922
- Preceded by: Alexander Krinitsky
- Succeeded by: Yan Gamarnik

Personal details
- Born: 29 August 1890 Līgatne, Cēsu apriņķis, Governorate of Livonia, Russian Empire
- Died: 29 July 1939 (aged 48) Kommunarka shooting ground, Moscow, Russian Soviet Federative Socialist Republic, Soviet Union
- Party: RSDLP (b) (1910–1918); All-Union Communist Party (b) (1918–1937)
- Other political affiliations: Communist Party of Byelorussia
- Profession: Historian; journalist

Vilhelm Georgiyevich Knorin (Russian: Вильгельм Георгиевич Кнорин, Latvian: Vilhelms "Vilis" Knoriņš; 29 August 1890 – 29 July 1939) was a Latvian Bolshevik revolutionary, Soviet politician, publicist and historian.

== Biography ==
Knorin was born in to a Latvian peasant family and was a member of the Bolshevik Party from 1910.

He served as the second First secretary of the Central Committee of the Communist Party of the Byelorussian SSR from 1920 to 1922 and from 1927 to 1928.

Being a Moscow-appointed de facto head of state of Belarus, Knorin is known for his notorious quote about the Belarusian independence: "We believe that Byelorussians are not a nation, and the ethnographic specifics, which differentiate them from Russians, must be erased. We, communists, in the region that you call Byelorussia, work without thinking of what tribe we are."

From 1926 to 1927 he was head of the propaganda department of the Central Committee of the All-Union Communist Party. In April–July 1934 he was executive editor of the Bolshevik journal.

From August 1935 to 1937 he was deputy head of the department of party propaganda and agitation of the Central Committee of the All-Union Communist Party. Knorin participated in the preparation of the "History of the Communist Party of the Soviet Union (Bolsheviks)".

At the same time, from 1928 to 1937, he was an employee of the Comintern. He headed the information and propaganda department of the Comintern.

He was arrested in July during the Great Purge and eventually executed two years later in July 1939.

Knorin was posthumously rehabilitated in December 1955.

A street in Minsk is named after Knorin.
