= Harkawicze =

- Village
- Interactive map of Harkawicze
- Location within Poland
- Coordinates: 53°19′18″N 23°43′29″E
- Country: Poland
- Voivodeship: Podlaskie
- County: Sokółka
- Gmina: Szudziałowo

Harkawicze [xarkaˈvit͡ʂɛ] (Belarusian: Гаркавічы) is a village in the administrative district of Gmina Szudziałowo, within Sokółka County, Podlaskie Voivodeship, in north-eastern Poland, close to the border with Belarus.

== Notable people ==
- Sergey Pritytsky, a Belarusian Communist politician
