= Aleksandr Osatkin-Vladimirsky =

Russian revolutionary and Soviet politician

- Александр Асаткин-Владимирский
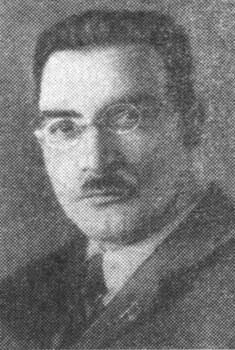

First Secretary of the Communist Party of Byelorussia
- In office February 1923 – May 1924
- Preceded by: Vilhelm Knorin
- Succeeded by: Alexander Krinitsky

Personal details
- Born: 15 October 1885 Kostroma Governorate, Russian Empire
- Died: 2 July 1937 (aged 51) Moscow, Russian Soviet Federative Socialist Republic, Soviet Union
- Party: RSDLP (b) (1903–1918); All-Union Communist Party (b) (1918–1937)
- Other political affiliations: Communist Party of Byelorussia

Aleksandr Nikolayevich Osatkin-Vladimirsky (Russian: Александр Николаевич Асаткин-Владимирский; 15 October 1885 – 2 July 1937) was a Russian revolutionary, Soviet politician and first secretary of the Communist Party of Byelorussia from 1923 to 1924.

He was a member of the Bolshevik wing of the Russian Social Democratic Labour Party since 1904 and was imprisoned 6 times and deported twice for his revolutionary activities.

In the years of 1930–31 he was the chairman of the executive committee of the Council of the Far Eastern Territory. Since 1932 in party and economic work. Member of the Central Committee of the Ukrainian Communist Party (B) in 1924–25. Member of the Central Committee of the CP (b) B in 1924–25.

He was expelled from the Central Committee of the Communist Party of Byelorussia of the USSR by a resolution of the plenum of the Central Committee held on July 3 and 4, 1937. The next day, July 5, he was arrested. Osatkin-Vladimirsky was shot on September 2 of that year. 20 years later, in 1957, he was posthumously rehabilitated.
