= Aleksei Volkov (politician) =

Soviet politician (1890–1942)

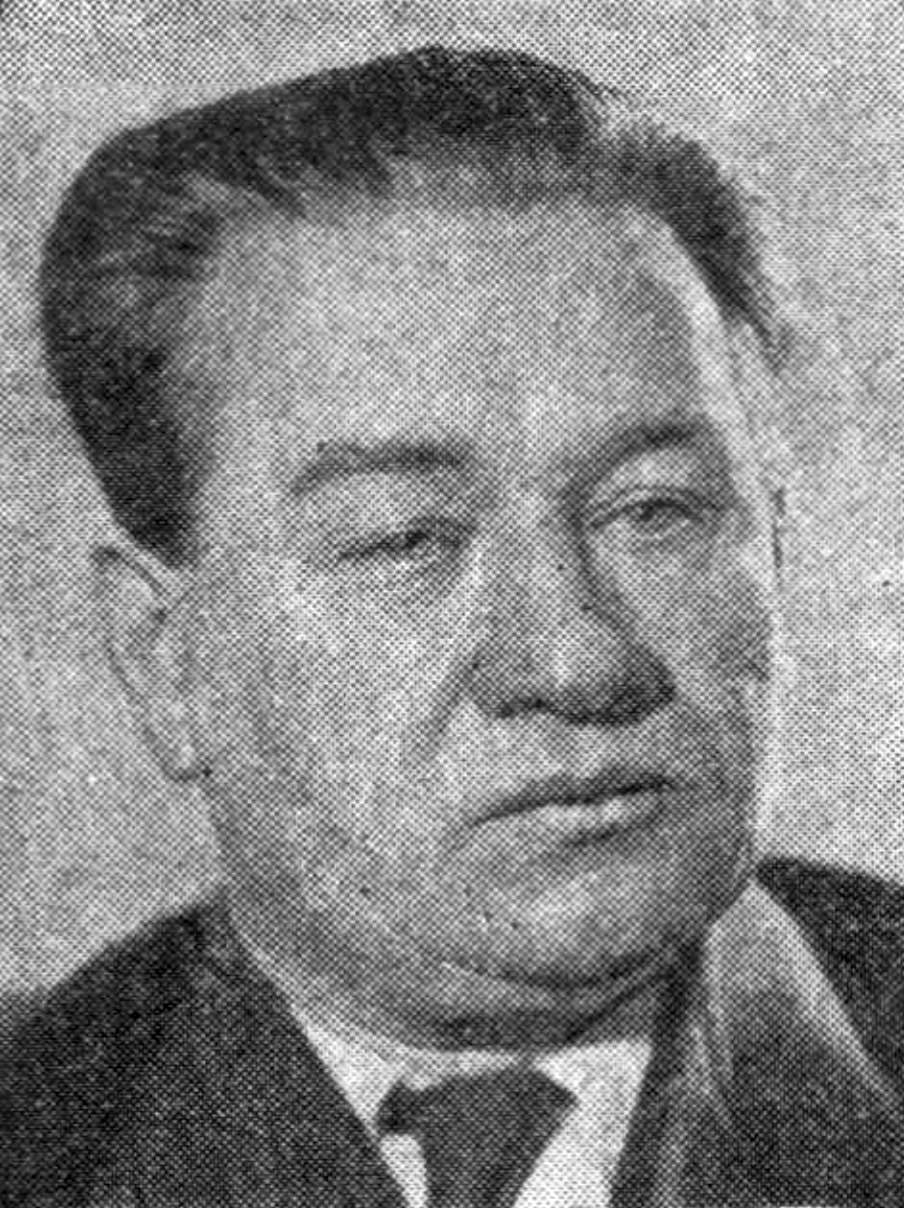
Aleksei Alekseyevich Volkov in 1938

Aleksei Alekseyevich Volkov (Russian: Алексе́й Алексе́евич Во́лков; Belarusian: Аляксе́й Аляксе́евіч Во́лкаў; 1889–1942) was a Russian Soviet statesman and first secretary of Communist Party of Byelorussia in 1937–1938. After his tenure there, he worked as a member of the Central Auditing Commission of the All-Union Communist Party (Bolsheviks).

== Personal life ==
Volkov was born on 26 December 1889 in the small village of Dmitrievo, which was then part of Ryazan Governorate in the Russian Empire.

He died in the city of Moscow on 4 March 1942.
