= Costarrican Ochomogo economic miracle =

Costa Rican economic growth from 1949 to 1980

The Economic Miracle of Ochomogo refers to the unprecedented economic growth between 1949 and 1980 that the Costa Rican economy underwent after the great economic and social reforms imposed by the Founding Junta of the Second Republic in 1949 as the aftermath of the 1948 Costa Rican Civil War. During this period, life expectancy nearly doubled, from 47 to 73 years.

The factors that led to this massive growth were largely:

- The entry of women into the workforce.
- Industrialization policies by the Figueres Ferrer administration and the Founding Board during 1949, 1953–1958 and from 1970 to 1974 focused on protectionism towards the cooperative agro-industrial sector.
- Political stability guaranteed by the constitutional and structural solidity of the state of Costa Rica after the second republic.
- The so-called "entrepreneur state" during the decades of the 60's and 70's where large state companies flooded the state coffers with fresh resources and generated internal chaining.
- Construction of the nation's major public works and modernization of the San José road network.

Although these policies are usually attributed to the rates of growth that the country experienced during the period between 1949 and 1980, it is also worth noting that state-owned enterprises were mostly inefficient, riddled with debt, which forced the country to borrow larger amounts each year, leading to a fiscal crisis in the late 1970's, and the largest economic downturn in the country's history.
