= Supreme Soviet of the Byelorussian Soviet Socialist Republic =

Unicameral legislature of the Byelorussian Soviet Socialist Republic (1938–1991)

Supreme Soviet of the Byelorussian SSR Вярхоўны Савет Беларускай ССР (Belarusian) Верховный Совет Белорусской ССР (Russian)
- (Byelorussian Soviet Socialist Republic) Byelorussian SSR (1938–1941, 1947–1991)
- Emblem of the Byelorussian Soviet Socialist Republic

Type
- Type: Supreme Soviet

History
- Established: 1938; 1947 (re-establishment)
- Disbanded: 1941 (Nazi occupation); 1991
- Preceded by: All-Byelorussian Central Executive Committee and All-Byelorussian Congress of Soviets
- Succeeded by: Supreme Council of Belarus

Leadership
- Chairman: Stanislav Shushkevich (last)
- Chairman of the Presidium: Nikolai Dementey (last)

Elections
- Last election: 1990

Meeting place
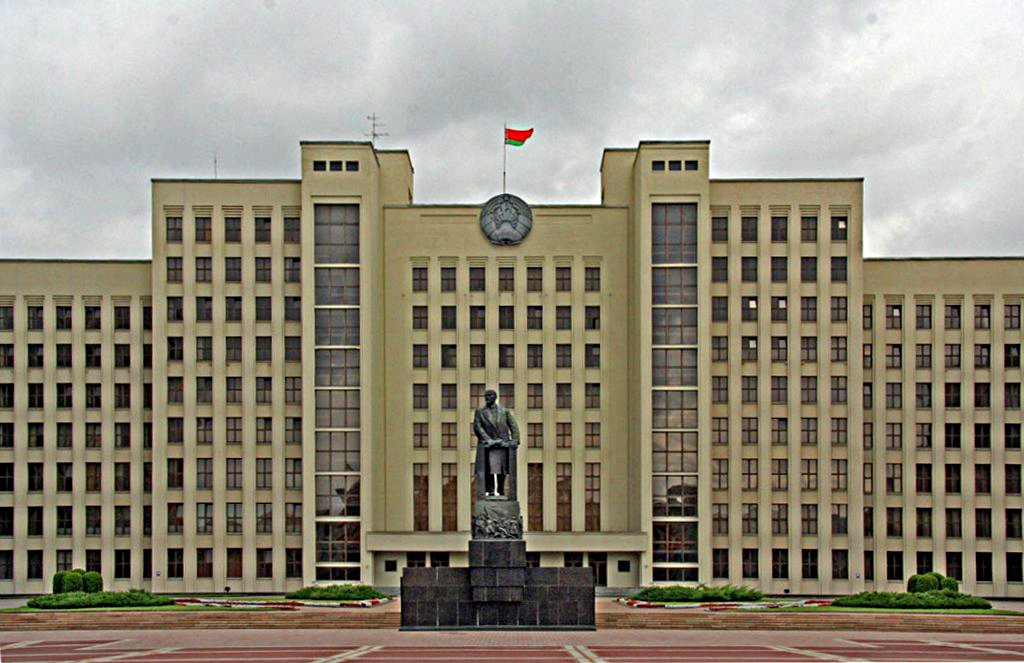
- Supreme Soviet Building, Minsk, Byelorussian SSR, Soviet Union

The Supreme Soviet of the Byelorussian SSR (Belarusian: Вярхоўны Савет Беларускай ССР, Vyarkhowny Savyet Byelaruskay SSR; Russian: Верховный Совет Белорусской ССР tr. Verkhovnyy Sovet Belorusskoy SSR) was the highest organ of state power of Belarus (Byelorussia), then known as the Byelorussian SSR from 1938 to 1991. It was the only branch of government in the republic, and per the principle of unified power, all state organs are subservient to it. The Supreme Soviet of the Byelorussian SSR was preceded by the All-Byelorussian Central Executive Committee (1920–1938) and the All-Byelorussian Congress of Soviets (1919–1937). The Supreme Soviet of the Byelorussian SSR was briefly disbanded in 1941 due to the Great Patriotic War and was re-established in 1947. The Supreme Soviet of the Byelorussian SSR was briefly succeeded by the Supreme Council of Belarus from 1991 to 1996. The Supreme Council of Belarus was succeeded by the National Assembly of Belarus in 1996.

Until Gorbachev's democratization program, the Supreme Soviet of the Byelorussian SSR was a rubber stamp like all other supreme soviets of the union republics of the Soviet Union, existing only to provide legal sanction for policies already implemented by the Communist Party of Byelorussia. The 1990 Belarusian Supreme Soviet election was the only supreme soviet election where opposition parties were able to run.

== History ==
The Supreme Soviet of the Byelorussian SSR was established pursuant to the Constitution of the Byelorussian SSR from 1937, which changed the organization of main political organs of the republic. In theory, the Supreme Soviet's powers were unlimited per unified power. However, in practice, the Supreme Soviet's powers were curtailed by the Communist Party of Byelorussia.

Supreme Soviet elections were held in 1938, 1947, 1951, 1955, 1959, 1963, 1967, 1971, 1975, 1980, 1985, and 1990. In 1990, 360 deputies were elected.

== Chairmen of the Supreme Soviet ==
The Chairman of the Supreme Soviet was speaker of the legislative assembly. With the disbandment of the Presidium of the Supreme Soviet of the Byelorussian SSR in May 1990, the powers of the Chairman of the Presidium of the Supreme Soviet were transferred to the Chairman of the Supreme Soviet. This changed the role and powers of the Chairman of the Supreme Soviet from 1990 and onwards. The office-holders remained speakers of the assembly and additionally became the de jure heads of state.

No.	Picture	Name (Birth–Death)	Took office	Left office	Political party
Chairmen of the Supreme Soviet
1		Nadezhda Grekova (1910–2001)	25 July 1938	12 March 1947	CPSU
2		Vasily Kozlov (1903–1967)	12 March 1947	17 March 1948	CPSU
3		Eugene Bugaev (1912–1997)	17 March 1948	14 April 1949	CPSU
4		Joseph Belsky (1903–1966)	14 April 1949	28 March 1955	CPSU
5		Timofey Garbunov (1904–1969)	28 March 1955	28 March 1963	CPSU
6		Vasily Shavura (1912–2007)	28 March 1963	22 December 1965	CPSU
7		Maksim Tank (1912–1995)	22 December 1965	15 July 1971	CPSU
8		Ivan Shamiakin (1921–2004)	15 July 1971	28 March 1985	CPSU
9		Ivan Naumenko (1925–2006)	28 March 1985	15 May 1990	CPSU
10		Nikolai Dementey (1930–2018)	19 May 1990	25 August 1991	CPSU
–		Stanislav Shushkevich (1934–2022)	25 August 1991	18 September 1991	CPSU

== Chairmen of the Presidium of the Supreme Soviet ==
The Chairman of the Presidium of the Supreme Soviet was the de jure head of state of the Byelorussian SSR. With the disbandment of the Presidium of the Supreme Soviet of the Byelorussian SSR in May 1990, the powers of the Chairman of the Presidium of the Supreme Soviet were transferred to the Chairman of the Supreme Soviet. This changed the role and powers of the Chairman of the Supreme Soviet from 1990 and onwards.

No.	Picture	Name (Birth–Death)	Took office	Left office	Political party
Chairmen of the Presidium of the Supreme Soviet
1		Nikifor Natalevich (1900–1964)	27 July 1938	17 March 1948	CPSU
2		Vasily Kozlov (1903–1967)	17 March 1948	2 December 1967	CPSU
–		Fyodor Surganov (1911–1976)	2 December 1967	22 January 1968	CPSU
–		Valentina Klochkova (1924–?)	2 December 1967	22 January 1968	CPSU
3		Sergey Pritytsky (1913–1971)	22 January 1968	13 June 1971	CPSU
–		Fyodor Surganov (1911–1976)	13 June 1971	16 July 1971	CPSU
–		Ivan Klimov (1903–1991)	13 June 1971	16 July 1971	CPSU
–		Valentina Klochkova (1924–?)	13 June 1971	16 July 1971	CPSU
4		Fyodor Surganov (1911–1976)	16 July 1971	26 December 1976	CPSU
–		Vladimir Lobanok (1907–1984)	27 December 1976	28 February 1977	CPSU
–		Zinaida Bychkovskaya (born 1941)	27 December 1976	28 February 1977	CPSU
5		Ivan Paliakoŭ (1914–2004)	28 February 1977	29 November 1985	CPSU
6		Georgy Tarazevich (1937–2003)	29 November 1985	28 July 1989	CPSU
7		Nikolai Dementey (1930–2018)	28 July 1989	15 May 1990	CPSU

== See also ==
- Supreme Soviet of the Soviet Union
- Supreme Soviet
- Byelorussian SSR
