= Mikhail Malinin =

Soviet general

Mikhail Sergeevich Malinin
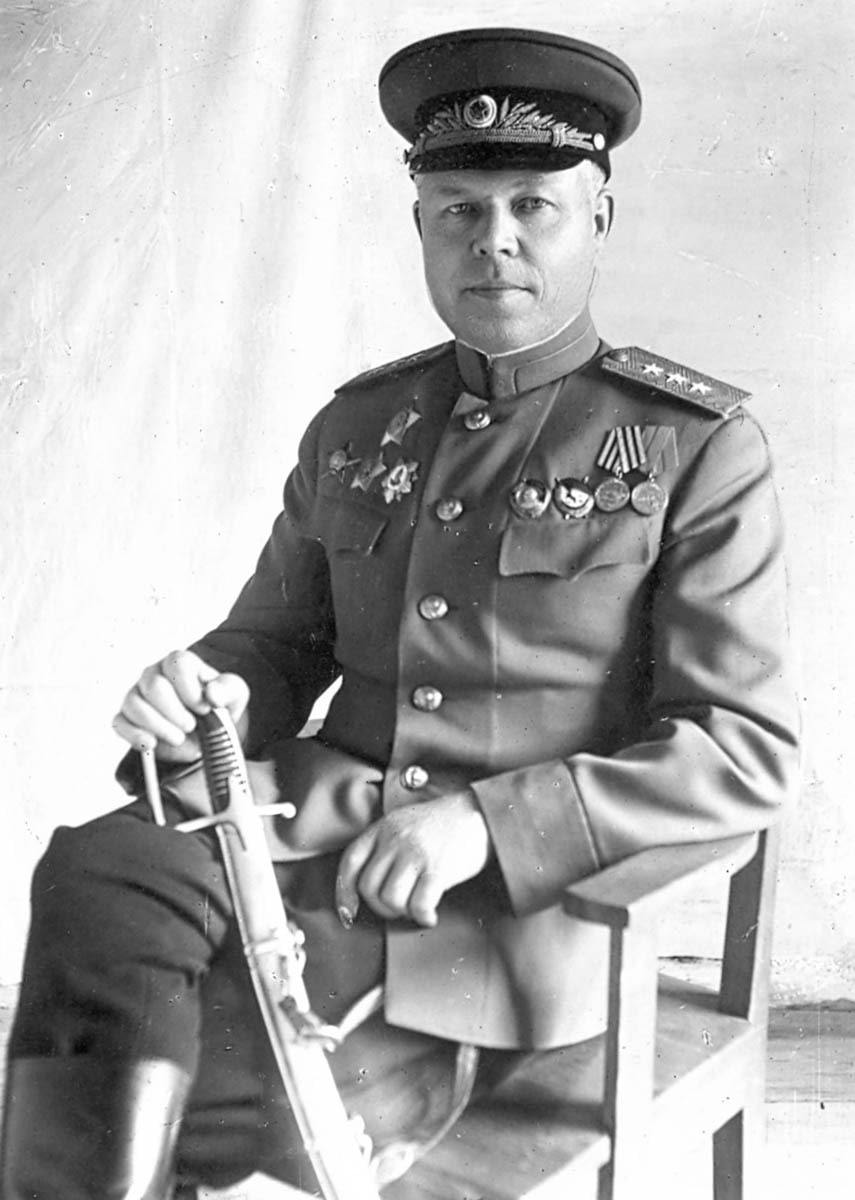
- Colonel general Mikhail Malinin in Poland.
- Born: December 28, 1899; Polutino, Kostroma Governorate, Russian Empire
- Died: January 24, 1960 (aged 60); Moscow, Soviet Union
- Burial place: Novodevichy Cemetery
- Military career
- Allegiance: Soviet Union (1919–1960)
- Service years: 1919–1960
- Rank: Army General
- Commands: Chief of Staff of the Central Front
- Conflicts: Russian Civil War; World War II; Winter War; Eastern Front
- Awards: Hero of the Soviet Union; Distinguished Service Order; Knight Commander of the Order of the British Empire

Mikhail Sergeevich Malinin (Russian: Михаи́л Серге́евич Мали́нин; December 28 [O.S. December 16, 1899] 1899 in Polutino, Kostroma Governorate, Russian Empire – 24 January 1960 in Moscow, Soviet Union) was a Soviet general.

== Biography ==
=== Early years ===
Mikhail Malinin was born in 1899 in the Kostroma Governorate of the Russian Empire in a peasant family of Russian ethnicity. Originally a village carpenter, Malinin joined the Red Army at 1919 and fought in the Civil War. He graduated from the Moscow 2nd Infantry School at 1922, serving in the Moscow Military District during most of the decade. At 1931, he matriculated from the Frunze Academy and joined the Communist Party. After two years he finished his studies at the Academy of Motorization and Mechanization. Malinin was assigned as an instructor to the Leningrad Armored Forces Commanders' Course at December 1937. He participated in the Soviet-Finnish War as the 9th Army's chief of operations, and was then appointed as the 7th Mechanized Corps' chief of staff, remaining in office until June 1941.

=== World War II ===
When Germany invaded the Soviet Union, Malinin was rushed to the front and posted as Rokossovsky's chief of staff in what remained of the 9th Mechanized Corps. Their unit took part in the Battle of Smolensk. As the 16th Army was reconstructed and Rokossovsky appointed its commander, Malinin followed him, becoming the Army's chief of staff at 19 August 1941.

He continued in that capacity, under Rokossovsky (and from November 1944, Zhukov), through much of the war: at the Bryansk (Chief of staff: 20.7.42 - 27.9.42), Don (30.9.42 - 15.2.43), Central (15.2.43 - 20.10.43) and Belorussian (20.10.43 - 10.6.45) Fronts. As such, he participated in the Battles of Moscow, Stalingrad, Kursk, Belarus, Poland and Berlin. Malinin was promoted to the rank of Lieutenant General at the 20 December 1942, and to Colonel-General at 18 September 1943.

=== Post-war career ===
On 29 May 1945, Malinin was awarded the title Hero of the Soviet Union (Medal no. 6456). He was the GSFG's chief of staff until 1948, and then the Soviet Army's chief of staff. From 1950 to 1952 he served as the Deputy Chief Inspector and the Chief Inspector of the Army. Then, he rose to be the Soviet Armed Forces' First Deputy Chief of Staff, an office he held until his death. As such, he was involved in the suppression of the 1956 Hungarian uprising. On 3 August 1953, he was promoted to the rank of Army General.

Malinin was also a deputy in the 3rd and 4th convocations of the Supreme Soviet. A candidate to the Central Committee at the years 1952–56, he was elected a member of the Central Auditing Commission.

== Honours and awards ==
- "Gold Star" Hero of the Soviet Union (29 May 1945)
- Four Orders of Lenin (2 January 1942, 21 February 1945, 29 May 1945, 26 December 1959)
- Order of the Red Banner, four times (17 August 1943, 3 November 1944, 15 November 1950)
- Order of Suvorov, 1st class, twice (29 July 1944, 6 April 1945) and 2nd class (2 October 1943)
- Order of Kutuzov, 1st class, twice (28 January 1943, 18 December 1956 - for action during the intervention in Hungary)
- Order of the Red Star (21 May 1940- for the Finnish campaign)
- Medal "For the Defence of Moscow"
- Medal "For the Defence of Stalingrad"
- Medal "For the Liberation of Warsaw"
- Medal "For the Capture of Berlin"
- Silver Cross of the Virtuti Militari (Poland)
- Cross of Grunwald, 3rd class (Poland)
- Distinguished Service Order (UK, 1945)
- Knight Commander of the Order of the British Empire (UK, 1945)
- Jubilee Medal "XX Years of the Workers' and Peasants' Red Army"
- Jubilee Medal "30 Years of the Soviet Army and Navy"
- Jubilee Medal "40 Years of the Armed Forces of the USSR"
