= Economic history of Switzerland =

The economic history of Switzerland shows the long-term transition from a poor rural economy to a world leader in finance with a very high standard of living. By 1900 it had become one of the wealthiest nations in Europe in terms of GDP.

== 19th century ==
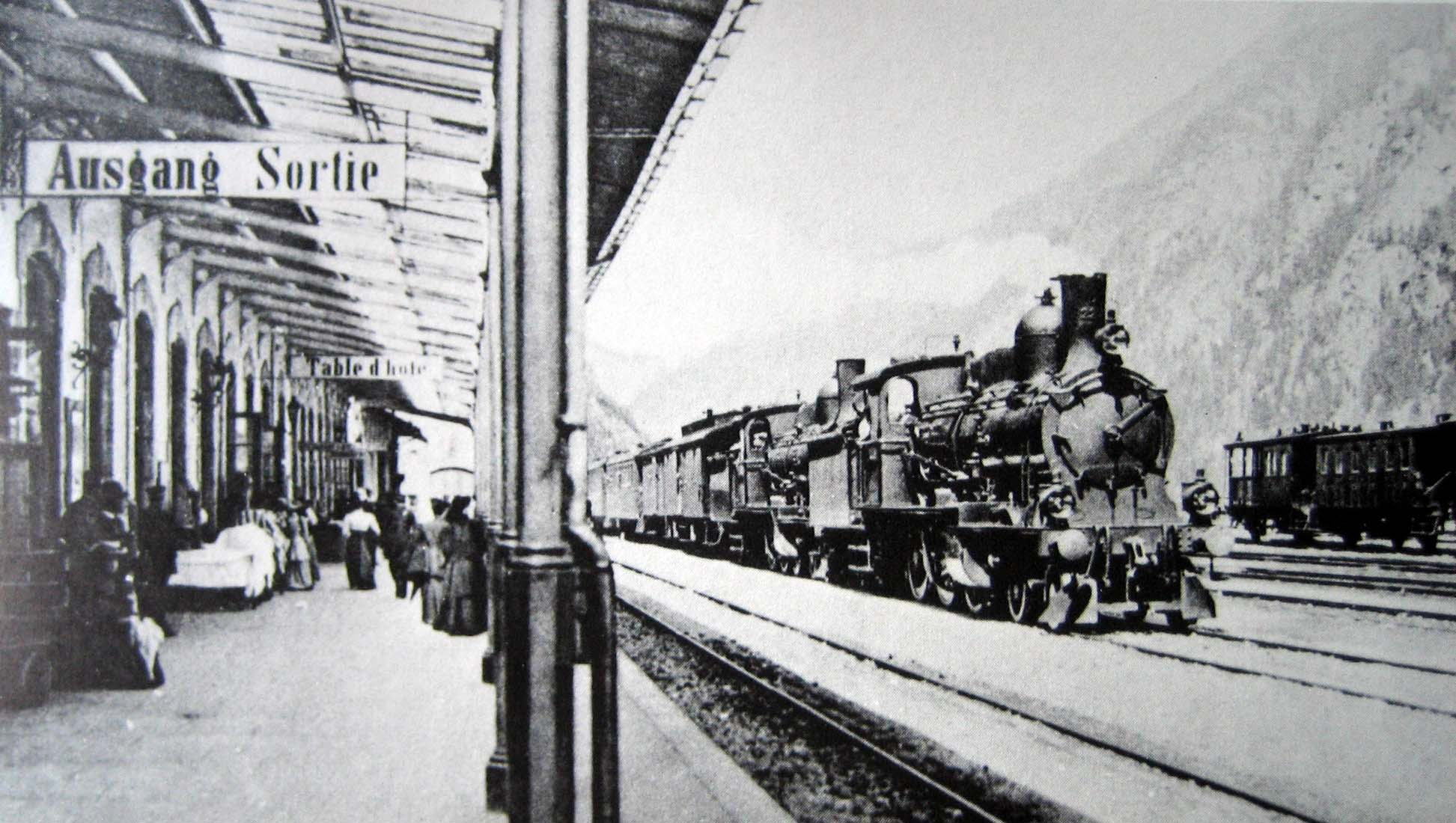
Gotthard line in 1882

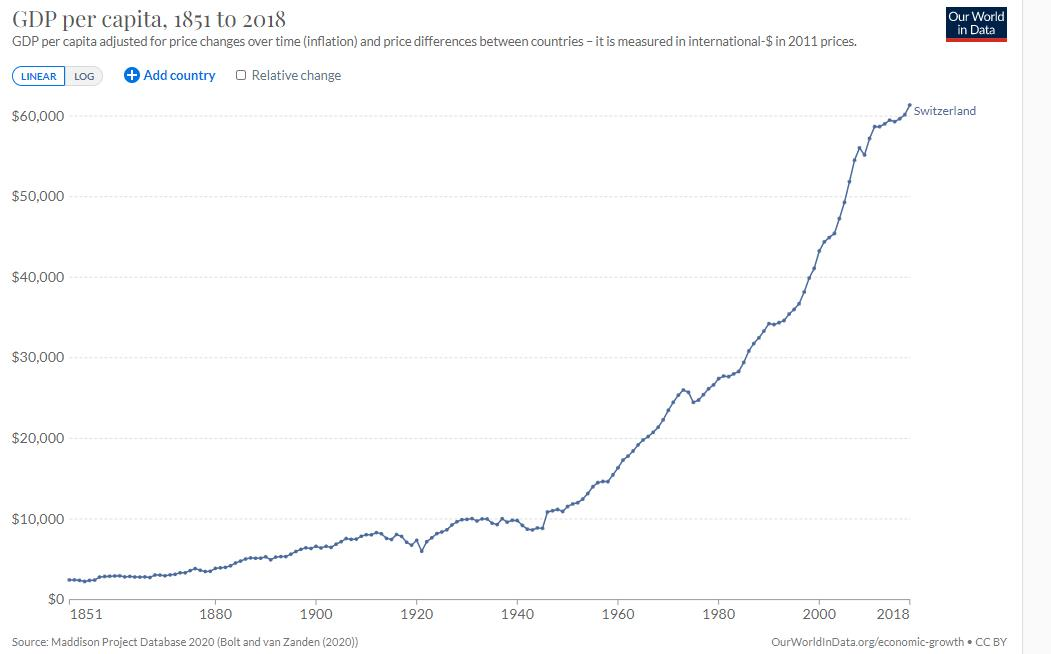
Development of real GDP per capita, 1851 to 2018

Switzerland as a federal state was established in 1848. Before that time, the city-cantons of Zürich, Geneva, and Basel in particular began to develop economically based on industry and trade, while the rural regions of Switzerland remained poor and underdeveloped. While a workshop system had been in existence throughout the early modern period, the production of machines began in 1801 in St. Gallen, with the third generation of machines imported from Great Britain. But in Switzerland, hydraulic power was often used instead of steam engines because of the country's mountainous topography and lack of significant deposits of coal. By 1814, hand weaving had been mostly replaced by the power loom. Both tourism and banking began to develop as economic factors at about the same time. While Switzerland was primarily rural, the cities experienced an industrial revolution in the late 19th century, focused especially on textiles. In Basel, for example, textiles, including silk, were the leading industry. In 1888, women made up 44% of wage earners. Nearly half the women worked in the textile mills, with household servants the second largest job category. The proportion of women in the workforce was higher between 1890 and 1910 than it was in the late 1960s and 1970s.

The new national government sought a strong unified nation. It introduced the Swiss franc in 1852, thereby providing a stable currency that replaced the chaotic currency situation. It took control of borders, the mail and telegraph systems, and a national army.

=== Railways ===
Railways played a central role in industrialization; the first railway opened in 1847, between Zürich and Baden. Alfred Escher was the leader in developing the rail system. He warned in 1849 that the large neighbors were planning to circumvent Switzerland, making it a forgotten backwater. The new Swiss Confederation established in 1848 took alarm and acted. In 1852 Escher achieved a national law that mandated construction and operation would be left to private companies. Quickly competing lines were built. Escher headed the largest firm, the Swiss Northeastern Railway, with links to major foreign lines. Thanks to the competition between private players, by 1860 Switzerland had a network of over 1000 km of track. After a national referendum, the government nationalized most of the private lines in the early 20th century, merging them into the Swiss Federal Railways.

=== Industry ===
Industry was underdeveloped, except for textiles. The watch industry speeded up thanks to a rising demand for time measurement as industrialization took hold in the West. Leading watchmakers organized a trade association in 1876. Longines, founded in 1832, discovered the luxury market to build a global reputation.

Banking slowly grew in importance, albeit far behind London and Paris. The Union Bank of Switzerland opened in 1862, the Swiss Bank Corporation in 1872. By the time of World War I, Switzerland's promises of secrecy and security attracted funding from wealthy parties worried about the impact of war and revolution.

=== Tourism ===
Tourism began in Switzerland with British mountaineers climbing the main peaks of the Bernese Alps in the early 19th century (Jungfrau 1811, Finsteraarhorn 1812). The Alpine Club in London was founded in 1857. Reconvalescence in the Alpine climate, in particular from tuberculosis, was another important branch of tourism in the 19th and early 20th centuries: for example in Davos, Graubünden. Due to the prominence of the Bernese Alps in British mountaineering, the Bernese Oberland was long especially known as a tourist destination. The first organised tourist holidays to Switzerland were offered during the 19th century by the Thomas Cook and Lunn Travel companies. Tourism in Switzerland had been exclusively for the rich until it became widely popular in the 20th century.

== 20th century ==
=== Industry ===
The industrial sector began to grow in the 19th century with a laissez-faire industrial/trade policy, Switzerland's emergence as one of the most prosperous nations in Europe, sometimes termed the "Swiss miracle", was a development of the mid 19th to early 20th centuries, among other things tied to the role of Switzerland during the World Wars.

The Pharmaceutical industry in Switzerland directly and indirectly employs about 135,000 people and generates 5.7% of the GDP.

Switzerland's total energy consumption, which was dropping from the mid-1910s to the early 1920s, started to increase again in the early 1920s. It stagnated during the 1930s before falling again during the early 1940s; but rapid growth started once again in the mid-1940s.

In the 1940s, particularly during World War II, the economy profited from the increased export and delivery of weapons to Germany, France, the United Kingdom, and other European countries. However, Switzerland's energy consumption decreased rapidly. The co-operation of the banks with the Nazis (although they also co-operated extensively with the British and French) and their commercial relations with the Axis powers during the war were later sharply criticised, resulting in a short period of international isolation of Switzerland. Switzerland's production facilities were largely undamaged by the war, and afterwards both imports and exports grew rapidly.

=== GDP growth ===
In the 1950s, annual GDP growth averaged 5% and Switzerland's energy consumption nearly doubled. Coal lost its rank as Switzerland's primary energy source, as other imported fossil fuels, such as crude and refined oil and natural and refined gas, increased.

In the 1960s, annual GDP growth averaged 4% and Switzerland's total energy consumption nearly doubled again. By the end of the decade oil provided over three-quarters of Switzerland's energy.

In the 1970s the GDP growth rate gradually declined from a peak of 6.5% in 1970; GDP then contracted by 7.5% in 1975 and 1976. Switzerland became increasingly dependent on oil imported from its main suppliers, the OPEC cartel. The 1973 international oil crisis caused Switzerland's energy consumption to decrease in the years from 1973 to 1978. In 1974 there were three nationwide car-free Sundays when private transport was prohibited as a result of the oil supply shock. From 1977 onwards GDP grew again, although Switzerland was also affected by the 1979 energy crisis which resulted in a short-term decrease in Switzerland's energy consumption. In 1970 industry still employed about 46% of the labor force, but during the economic recession of the 1970s the services sector grew to dominate the national economy. By 1970 17.2% of the population and about one quarter of the work force were foreign nationals, though job losses during the economic recession decreased this number.

In the 1980s, Switzerland's economy contracted by 1.3% in 1982 but grew substantially for the rest of the decade, with annual GDP growth between about 3% and 4%, apart from 1986 and 1987 when growth decreased to 1.9% and 1.6% respectively.

Switzerland's economy was marred by slow growth in the 1990s, having the weakest economic growth in Western Europe. The economy was affected by a three-year recession from 1991 to 1993, when the economy contracted by 2%. The contraction also became apparent in Switzerland's energy consumption and export growth rates. Switzerland's economy averaged no appreciable increase (only 0.6% annually) in GDP.

After enjoying unemployment rates lower than 1% before 1990, the three-year recession also caused the unemployment rate to rise to its all-time peak of 5.3% in 1997. In 2008, Switzerland was in second place among European countries with populations above one million in terms of nominal and purchasing power parity GDP per capita, behind Norway (see list). Several times in the 1990s, real wages decreased since nominal wages could not keep up with inflation. However, beginning in 1997, a global resurgence in currency movement provided the necessary stimulus to the Swiss economy. It slowly gained momentum, and peaked in the year 2000 with 3.7% growth in real terms.

== 2000s ==
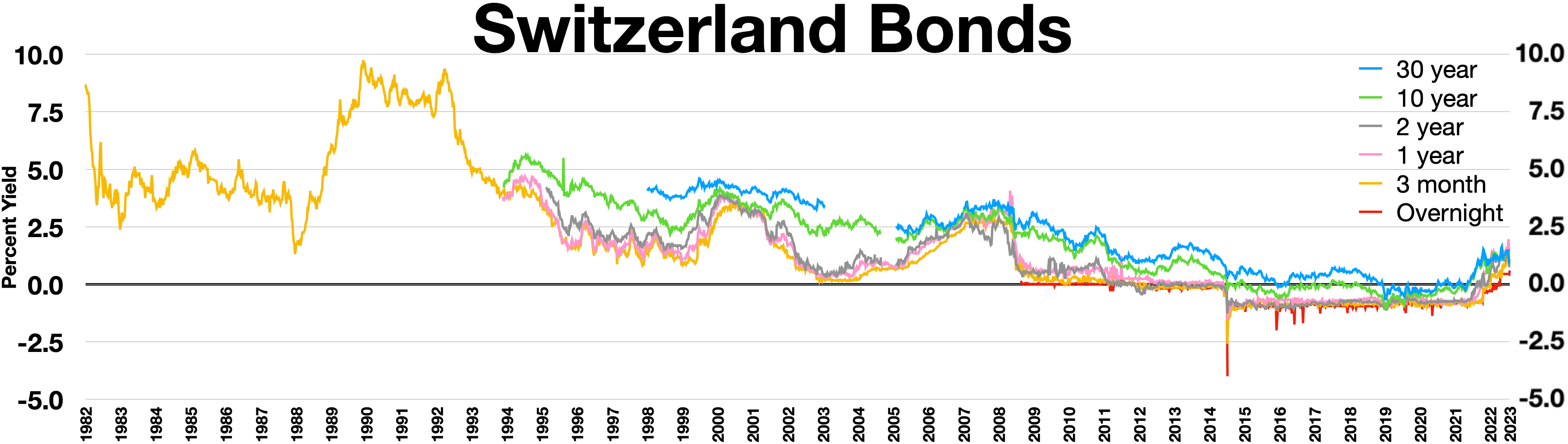
Switzerland bonds Inverted yield curve in 2023 30 year 10 year 2 year 1 year 3 month Overnight

In the early 2000s recession, being so closely linked to the economies of Western Europe and the United States, Switzerland could not escape the slowdown in these countries. After the worldwide stock market crashes in the wake of the 9/11 terrorist attacks, there were more announcements of false enterprise statistics and exaggerated managers' wages. The rate of GDP growth dropped to 1.2% in 2001; 0.4% in 2002; and minus 0.2% in 2003. This economic slowdown had a noticeable impact on the labour market.

Many companies announced mass dismissals and thus the unemployment rate rose from its low of 1.6% in September 2000 to a peak of 4.3% in January 2004, although well below the European Union (EU) rate of 9.2% at the end of 2004.

On 10 November 2002 the economics magazine Cash suggested five measures for political and economic institutions to implement to revive the Swiss economy:

1. Private consumption should be promoted with decent wage increases. In addition to that, families with children should get discounts on their health insurance.

2. Switzerland's national bank should revive investments by lowering interest rates. Besides that, monetary institutions should increasingly credit consumers and offer cheaper land to be built on.

3. Switzerland's national bank was asked to devalue the Swiss Franc, especially compared to the Euro.

4. The government should implement the anti-cyclical measure of increasing budget deficits. Government spending should increase in the infrastructure and education sectors. Lowering taxes would make sense in order to promote private household consumption.

5. Flexible work schedules should be instituted, thus avoiding low demand dismissals.

These measures were applied with successful results while the government strove for the Magical Hexagon of full employment, social equality, economic growth, environmental quality, positive trade balance and price stability. The rebound which started in mid-2003 saw growth rate growth rate averaging 3% (2004 and 2005 saw a GDP growth of 2.5% and 2.6% respectively; for 2006 and 2007, the rate was 3.6%). In 2008, GDP growth was modest in the first half of the year while declining in the last two quarters. Because of the base effect, real growth came to 1.9%. While it contracted 1.9% in 2009, the economy started to pick up in Q3 and by the second quarter of 2010, it had surpassed its previous peak. Growth for 2010 was 2.6%

The stock market collapse of 2007–2009 deeply affected investment income earned abroad. This translated to a substantial fall in the surplus of the current account balance. In 2006, Switzerland recorded a 15.1% per GDP surplus. It went down to 9.1% in 2007 and further dropped to 1.8% in 2008. It recovered in 2009 and 2010 with a surplus of 11.9% and 14.6% respectively. Unemployment peaked in December 2009 at 4.4%. In August 2018 the unemployment rate was 2.4%.

=== Gross domestic product ===
For the " gross regional product" (GRP) by canton see List of Swiss cantons by GRP. The richest five per capita are Basel, Zug, Geneva, Zürich, and Neuchâtel.

The chart below shows the trend of the gross domestic product of Switzerland at market prices:

Year	GDP (billions of CHF)	US Dollar Exchange
1980	184	1.67 Francs
1985	244	2.43 Francs
1990	331	1.38 Francs
1995	374	1.18 Francs
2000	422	1.68 Francs
2005	464	1.24 Francs
2006	491	1.25 Francs
2007	521	1.20 Francs
2008	547	1.08 Francs
2009	535	1.09 Francs
2010	546	1.04 Francs
2011	659	0.89 Francs
2012	632	0.94 Francs
2013	635	0.93 Francs
2014	644	0.92 Francs
2015	646	0.96 Francs
2016	659	0.98 Francs
2017	668	1.01 Francs
2018	694	1.00 Francs

=== Adopts Sanctions against Russia 2022 ===
Following the 2022 Russian invasion of Ukraine, Switzerland decided to adopt all EU sanctions against Russia. According to the Swiss President Ignazio Cassis, the measures were "unprecedented but consistent with Swiss neutrality". The administration also confirmed that Switzerland would continue to offer its services to find a peaceful solution in the conflict. Switzerland only participates in humanitarian missions and provides relief supplies to the Ukrainian population and neighbouring countries. In total, about 870 people and more than 60 companies are subject to Swiss sanctions. Switzerland closed its airspace to Russian aircraft in March 2022.

== See also ==
- Banking in Switzerland
  - List of banks in Switzerland
  - Swiss franc
- Cantons of Switzerland see separate articles for cantonal economy
- Economy of Switzerland
- Energy in Switzerland
- Healthcare in Switzerland
- List of companies of Switzerland
  - List of Swiss companies by revenue
- Pharmaceutical industry in Switzerland
- Poverty in Switzerland
- Rail transport in Switzerland
  - Swiss Federal Railways
  - Swiss Northeastern Railway
- Science and technology in Switzerland
- Tourism in Switzerland
- Taxation in Switzerland
- Transport in Switzerland
