= Ivan Klimov =

Soviet politician

- Иван Климов

Personal details
- Born: 10 September 1903 Kostyukovka, Gomelsky Uyezd, Mogilev Governorate, Russian Empire
- Died: 9 October 1991 (aged 88) Minsk, Belarus
- Awards: Order of Lenin Order of the October Revolution Order of the Red Banner Order of the Red Banner of Labour

Ivan Frolovich Klimov (Belarusian: Іва́н Фро́лавіч Клі́маў, Russian: Иван Фролович Климов; 10 September 1903 – 9 October 1991) was a Soviet politician. He was the First Secretary of the Baranavichy Voblast Committee of the Communist Party from 1952 to 1953.

I.F. Klimov was born in 1903 in the Kostykovka village in Gomel region. Member of Communist Party of the Soviet Union (CPSU).

From 1915 to 1922 he worked on the Asipovichy-Slutsk railway and on water transport in Gomel. In 1931 he graduated from Belorussian Communist University. He participated in the Liberation campaign of the Red Army in Western Belarus, he worked in the interim administration of Vileyka Voblast, and later as the first secretary of Vileika regional party committee.

During the Great Patriotic War he was the first secretary of the regional party committee of the Communist Party of Belarus, Secretary of Tashkent Regional Party Committee, Secretary of the Operational Group of Minsk Regional Committee of the CP(b)B, the first Secretary of Vileika underground Party Regional Committee.

In the post-war years, for 30 years, he was in the leading position: the first Secretary of Vileika regional party committee, the first secretary of the Baranovichi regional party committee, a deputy chairman of the Council of Ministers of BSSR, a deputy chairman of the Presidium of the Supreme Council of BSSR/ a delegate to many congresses of the Communist party of Soviet Union.

He was awarded 2 Orders of Lenin, 2 Orders of October Revolution, Order of Friendship of Peoples, Order of the Red Banner, 2 Orders of the Red Banner of Labour and 8 medals.

He is the author of the books «People of the Narachansky Territory», «Partisans of Vileishchyna».

He died in 1991, at the age of 88.
