= Nikolai Avkhimovich =

Soviet and Belarusian politician

Nikolai Yefremovich Avkhimovich (Belarusian: Мікала́й Яфрэ́мавіч Аўхімо́віч, Russian: Никола́й Ефре́мович Авхимо́вич; 14 January 1907 – 12 September 1996) was a Soviet and Belarusian politician. He served as the Chairman of the Council of Ministers of the Byelorussian Soviet Socialist Republic from 28 July 1956 to April 1959.

== Early life ==
He was born on 14 January 1907 in Barysaw, which was then part of the Minsk Governorate in the Russian Empire. In 1922 he started working as an assistant driver of the military's autosanitary detachment No. 16 in Smolensk. Just a few months later, in July, he became the assistant driver of the military's cargo detachment No. 7, which was located in Minsk and Gomel. He then quit driving in 1923 to be a student of the post and telegraph office in his native town of Barysaw. In 1924 he switched jobs to a laborer at a sawmill called R. Luxemburg in Barysaw, which he did until 1926.

== Political career ==
In 1926 he joined the CPSU and took on a variety of positions, including becoming chairman of the trade union bureau in Lepel, part of Lepel's district executive committee, and secretary of the Komsomol Committee in Lepel. After four years he left those positions and in 1930 he became head the organizational department of the Lepel District Consumer Society, but in September he also left this position. In 1932, he began studying at the Higher Communist Agricultural School of Belarus named after Vladimir Lenin, which he graduated from in 1933. After graduating he became Deputy Head of the Pukhavichy district MTS until 1935.

In 1942, he helped create the Belarusian Special Army as part of the Belarusian resistance during World War II, sending Panteleimon Ponomarenko lists of generals and senior officers of the Red Army to be selected for the army.

== Death ==
Avkhimovich died on 12 September 1996 in Minsk.
