= Communist Party of Byelorussia =

Communist Party of Byelorussia Камуністычная партыя Беларусі
- Founded: 30–31 December 1918
- Dissolved: 25 April 1993
- Split from: Belarusian Socialist Assembly
- Succeeded by: Party of Belarusian Communists
- Ideology: Communism; Marxism–Leninism
- Political position: Far-left
- National affiliation: Communist Party of the Soviet Union
- International affiliation: Comintern (until 1943); Cominform (until 1956)
- Colours: Red
- Slogan: Workers of the world, unite!
- Anthem: The Internationale; Anthem of Byelorussian SSR
- Supreme Soviet (1990): 302 / 360 (84%)

Party flag

The Communist Party of Byelorussia (CPB; Russian: Коммунистическая партия Белоруссии, romanized: Kommunisticheskaya partiya Byelorussii; Belarusian: Камуністычная партыя Беларусі, romanized: Kamunistyčnaja partyja Bielarusi) was the ruling Marxist-Leninist party of the Byelorussian Soviet Socialist Republic, a constituent republic of the Soviet Union from 1922, that existed from 1918 to 1993.

== History ==
The party was founded in 1917 as the Communist Party (Bolsheviks) of Byelorussia (Russian: Коммунистическая партия (большевиков) Белоруссии) following the Russian Revolution of 1917 as part of the Russian Communist Party (bolsheviks) led by Vladimir Lenin on 30–31 December 1918 with 17,800 members. It was important in creating the Byelorussian Soviet Republic in January 1919. From February 1919 until 1920 it functioned as a single organisation together with the Communist Party of Lithuania, known as the Communist Party (bolsheviks) of Lithuania and Belorussia. It was renamed to the Communist Party of Byelorussia in 1952.

The CPB was a communist party, organized on democratic centralism. This principle, introduced by Lenin, entails democratic and open discussion of policy issues within the party, followed by the requirement of total unity in upholding the agreed policies. The highest body within the CPB was the Party Congress, which convened every five years. When Congress was not in session, the Central Committee was the highest body. Because the Central Committee met twice a year, most day-to-day duties and responsibilities were vested in the Politburo, (previously the Presidium), the Secretariat. The party leader was the head of government and held the office of either General Secretary, Premier or head of state, or two of the three offices concurrently, but never all three at the same time. The party leader was the de facto chairman of the CPB Politburo and chief executive of the Republic. Ideologically, the CPB embraced Marxism–Leninism, a fusion of the original ideas of German philosopher and economic theorist Karl Marx, and Lenin, became formalized by Joseph Stalin as the party's guiding ideology and would remain so throughout the rest of its existence.

With debate raging regarding Belarusian independence, Byelorussian representatives in Petrograd were far more willing to accept Joseph Stalin's plans for establishing an autonomous Byelorussian Authority. Byelorussian Communist Party First Secretary Alexander Miasnikian, however, initially having held control of Minsk, was seemingly unwilling to share collective influence regarding the future affairs of Byelorussia. This internal conflict resulted in Byelorussian nationalist leadership attempting to establish power by calling the All-Byelorussian National Congress, in which 1872 delegates were gathered to discuss the future of the nation. While contingents of the organization voted in the Rada, a council of representatives for Byelorussia, the Communist Party played an active role in suppressing the Rada, causing them to go underground.

The 1930s saw the Communist Party of Byelorussia targeted most heavily by Stalin's purges. The vast majority of high-profile figures were arrested and removed, while an additional 40% of all members were also removed (Marples 1999, 8-9) Having taken place during Stalin's infamous purges, much of the socially and culturally significant gains that the occurred—such as the return of exiled individuals, a resurrection of language, among other cultural developments that had begun in the 1920s—had become halted, affecting Byelorussian culture and society for some significant time. 1937 especially saw the highest rate of purges throughout the Party, but arrests and removals of key figures continued well into the 1940s. These formative years tended to halt specific social developments pushed by the Communist Party, hindering much for the Byelorussian Soviet Socialist Republic.

28 July 1990, from Art. 6 of the Constitution of the Byelorussian SSR, the provision on the monopoly of the Communist Party of Byelorussia on power was excluded.

From 25 August 1991, to 3 February 1993, the activities of the Communist Party of Belarus were suspended.

On 25 April 1993, at the XXXII (extraordinary) congress of the Communist Party of Belarus, it was decided to join the party in the Party of Communists of Belarus (PCB).

== First Secretaries of the Communist Party of Byelorussia ==
No.	Picture	Name (Birth–Death)	Took office	Left office	Political party
First Secretary of the Central Committee
1		Alexander Miasnikian (1886–1925)	1918	1919	CPB
2		Vincas Mickevičius-Kapsukas (1880–1935)	1919	1919	CPB
3		Yefim Genkin (1880–1935)	11 November 1920	1920	CPB
4		Vilhelm Knorin (1890–1939)	25 November 1920	May 1922	CPB/CPSU
5		Waclaw Bogucki (1884–1937)	May 1922	4 February 1924	CPB/CPSU
7		Aleksandr Osatkin-Vladimirsky (1885–1937)	4 February 1924	14 May 1924	CPB/CPSU
8		Alexander Krinitsky (1894–1937)	September 1924	7 May 1927	CPB/CPSU
9		Vilhelm Knorin (1890–1939)	7 May 1927	4 December 1928	CPB/CPSU
10		Yan Gamarnik (1894–1937)	4 December 1928	3 January 1930	CPB/CPSU
11		Konstantin Gey (1896–1939)	3 January 1930	18 January 1932	CPB/CPSU
12		Nikolay Gikalo (1897–1938)	18 January 1932	18 March 1937	CPB/CPSU
13		Vasily Sharangovich (1897–1938)	18 March 1937	17 July 1937	CPB/CPSU
14		Yakov Yakovlev (1896–1938)	27 July 1937	8 August 1937	CPB/CPSU
15		Aleksei Volkov (1890–1942)	11 August 1937	18 June 1938	CPB/CPSU
16		Panteleimon Ponomarenko (1902–1984)	18 June 1938	7 March 1947	CPB/CPSU
17		Nikolai Gusarov (1905–1985)	7 March 1947	31 May 1950	CPB/CPSU
18		Nikolai Patolichev (1908–1989)	31 May 1950	28 July 1956	CPB/CPSU
19		Kirill Mazurov (1914–1989)	28 July 1956	30 March 1965	CPB/CPSU
20		Pyotr Masherov (1918–1980)	30 March 1965	4 September 1980	CPB/CPSU
21		Tikhon Kiselyov (1917–1983)	15 October 1980	11 January 1983	CPB/CPSU
22		Nikolay Slyunkov (1929–2022)	13 January 1983	6 February 1987	CPB/CPSU
23		Yefrem Sokolov (1926–2022)	6 February 1987	30 November 1990	CPB/CPSU
24		Anatoly Malofeyev (1933–2022)	30 November 1990	25 April 1993	CPB/CPSU

== See also ==
- Belarusian United Left Party "A Just World"
- Communist Party of Belarus
