= Fifth inauguration of Alexander Lukashenko =

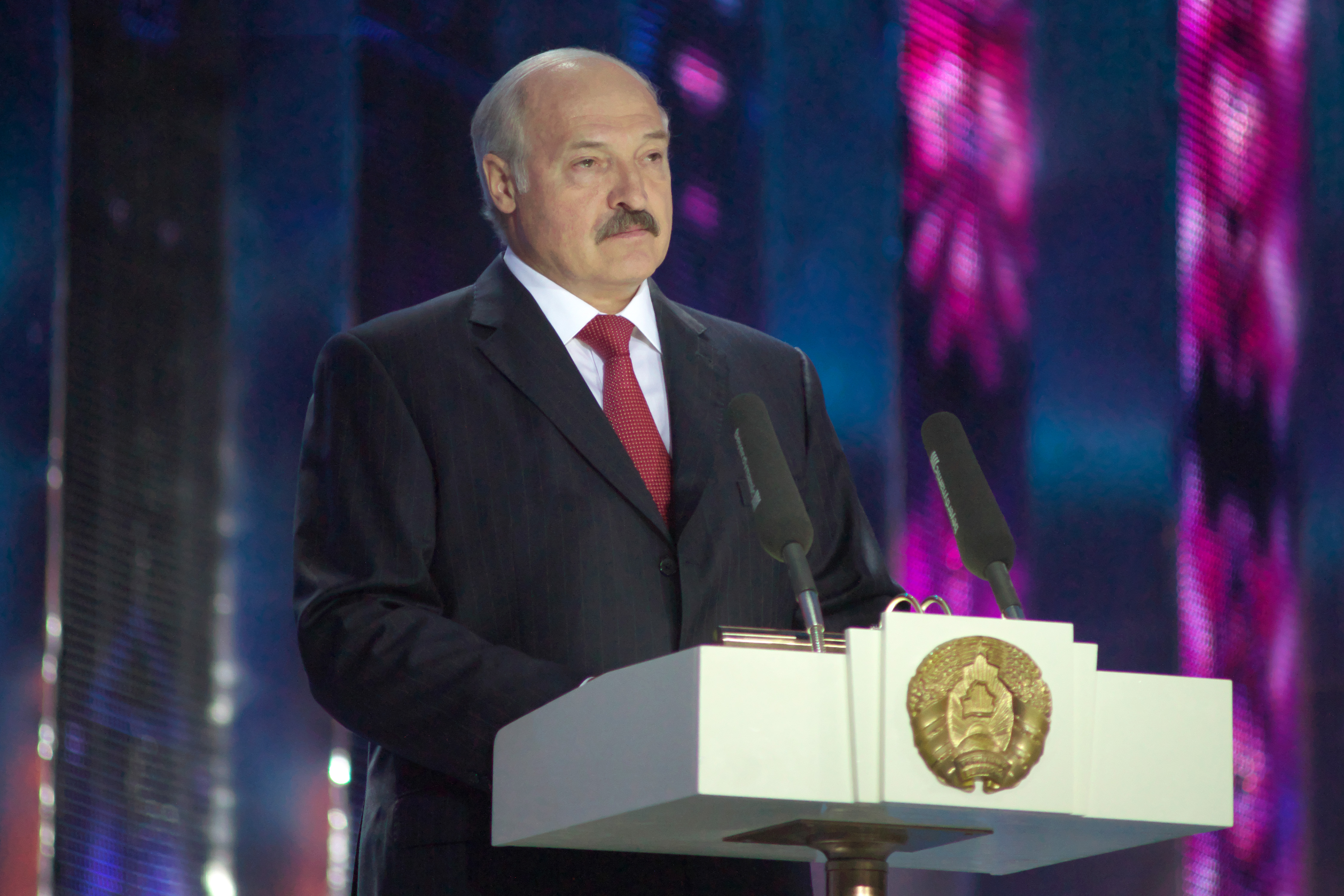
- Lukashenko in July 2015, four months prior to the inauguration.
- Date: November 6, 2015; 11 years ago
- Venue: Independence Palace, Minsk
- Location: 53°55′36″N 27°31′32″E
- Also known as: 2015 Presidential Inauguration of Alexander Lukashenko
- Participants: President of Belarus, Alexander Lukashenko

The fifth inauguration of Alexander Lukashenko as the president of Belarus took place on November 6, 2015. The ceremony was held in the Independence Palace in Minsk for the first time. President Lukashenko was inaugurated in the presence of over 1,000 invited guests, who will include top government officials, members of both chambers of the parliament, all kinds of executives, and foreign guests. Presidential elections were held in Belarus on 11 October 2015. Incumbent president Alexander Lukashenko was re-elected for a fifth term in office, with 83.47% of the vote.

== Ceremony ==
President Lukashenko arrived to the Independence Palace to the tune of the Presidential fanfare. Then Lidia Yermoshina, the chairwoman of the Central Election Commission of Belarus ordered 3 soldiers from Honor Guard of the Armed Forces of Belarus to bring out the flag of Belarus, the presidential standard, and the Constitution of Belarus. Once the constitution was on the central tribune, Lukashenko then put his hand on the constitution and recited the oath. Once he officially took office, My Belarusy was then played in honor of the occasion. After the anthem of Belarus was played, Lukashenko then delivered a speech to the attendees. After finishing his address, the Lukashenko proceeded to the State Flag Square in the center of Minsk to attend a military ceremony. The troops on the square then swore allegiance to the president and the country.

== Notable attendees ==
- Cui Qiming, Ambassador of China to Belarus
- Kozidavlat Koimdodov, Ambassador of Tajikistan to Belarus
- Leonid Kuchma, former president of Ukraine
- Gennady Zyuganov, Chairman of the Communist Party of the Russian Federation
- Vladimir Kovalyonok, Soviet cosmonaut
- Darya Domracheva, Belarusian athlete
