= Sobycheve =

Sobycheve Собичеве
- Village
- Location within Sumy Oblast Location within Ukraine
- Coordinates: 51°48′59″N 33°41′38″E
- Country: Ukraine
- Oblast: Sumy
- Raion: Shostka Raion
- Elevation: 163 m (535 ft)

Population (2001)
  - Total: 641
- Time zone: UTC+2 (EET)
  - Summer (DST): UTC+3 (EEST)
- Postal code: 41133
- Area code: +380 5449

Sobycheve (Ukrainian: Собичеве) is a village in Shostka Raion, Sumy Oblast, Ukraine.

== Demographics ==
According to the 1989 census, the population of Sobycheve was 775 people, of whom 329 were men and 446 were women.

Native language as of the Ukrainian Census of 2001:

Language	Percentage
Ukrainian	91.73 %
Russian	7.93 %
Belarusian	0.31 %

== Notable residents ==
Trokhym Lukashenko, the maternal grandfather of Alexander Lukashenko, was born in Sobycheve.
