= Independence Palace, Minsk =

Palace in Minsk, Belarus

Independence Palace
- Палац Незалежнасцi
- Independence Palace
- Interactive map of the Independence Palace area

General information
- Location: Praspiekt Pieramožcaŭ, Minsk, Belarus
- Coordinates: 53°55′36″N 27°31′32″E
- Construction started: June 2011
- Completed: 24 October 2013

Technical details
- Floor area: 50,000 sq m

Design and construction
- Architect: Vladimir Arkhangelsky

Independence Palace (Belarusian: Палац Незалежнасцi, romanized: Palac Niezaliežnasci) is a palace in Minsk. The palace is located on Pieramožcaŭ Avenue, near the "BelExpo" exhibition centre and the State Flag Square, not far from Victory Park.

The purpose of the Palace of Independence is to host important and landmark events, meetings of foreign delegations, honouring of big families, and the admittance of children to pioneer organisations.

On 7 May 2013 Alexander Lukashenko said:

The idea of this complex is to present the last biggest point of our independence visually. If you wish, this is a visual demonstration that Belarus is a country that has everything: the land, the coat-of-arms, and this Independence Palace.

== Structure and layout ==
The total area of the Palace of Independence is around 50,000 square metres (540,000 sq ft) and has several hundred rooms within. The Palace of Independence is oriented.

== History ==
The first official events in the palace were the meeting of the Supreme Eurasian Economic Council at the level of heads of state, and the meeting of the Council of CIS heads of state.

On 25 February 2014, Alexander Lukashenko awarded three-time champion of the 2014 Winter Olympics Darya Domracheva the Hero of Belarus medal.

The meeting on the Russo-Ukrainian War between the presidents of Russia, Ukraine, Belarus, Kazakhstan and representatives of the European Union was held at the Palace of Independence in Minsk on 26 August 2014.

The palace was a focal point for anti-government protesters during the 2020-2021 Belarusian protests.
