= Alexander Lukashenko =

President of Belarus since 1994

- Александр Лукашенко; Аляксандр Лукашэнка
- Lukashenko in 2026

1st President of Belarus
- Incumbent
- Assumed office 20 July 1994 (Note: Some countries, especially Western nations, do not recognise Lukashenko as the legitimate president of Belarus since the 2020 Belarusian presidential election. However, he continues to have de facto control over Belarus, being supported by Russia and China and by suppressing internal opposition.)
- Prime Minister: See list: Vyacheslav Kebich; Mikhail Chigir; Sergey Ling; Vladimir Yermoshin; Gennady Novitsky; Sergei Sidorsky; Mikhail Myasnikovich; Andrei Kobyakov; Syarhey Rumas; Roman Golovchenko; Alexander Turchin
- Preceded by: Myechyslaw Hryb (as Chairman of the Supreme Council)

1st Chairman of the All-Belarusian People's Assembly
- Incumbent
- Assumed office 24 April 2024
- Deputy: Aleksandr Kosinets
- Preceded by: Office established

Chairman of the Supreme State Council of the Union State
- Incumbent
- Assumed office 26 January 2000
- Chairman of the Council of Ministers: See list: Vladimir Putin; Mikhail Kasyanov; Mikhail Fradkov; Viktor Zubkov; Dmitry Medvedev; Mikhail Mishustin
- General Secretary: Pavel Borodin; Grigory Rapota; Dmitry Mezentsev; Sergey Glazyev
- Preceded by: Office established

Member of the Supreme Council of Belarus (Note: Of the Supreme Council of the Byelorussian SSR until 25 August 1991, thereafter of the independent Republic of Belarus)
- In office 15 May 1990 – 20 July 1994

Personal details
- Born: 30 August 1954 (age 72) Kopys, Byelorussian SSR, Soviet Union
- Party: Independent (1992–present)
- Other political affiliations: Communist Party of the Soviet Union (1979–1991); Communists for Democracy (1991–1992); Belaya Rus (2007–present) (Note: Affiliated non-member)
- Spouse: Galina Zhelnerovich (m. 1975)
- Children: Viktor; Dmitry; Nikolai
- Occupation: Politician
- Profession: Economist; teacher; collective farmer
- Website: president.gov.by/en/

Military service
- Allegiance: Soviet Union; Belarus
- Branch/service: Soviet Border Troops; Belarusian Armed Forces
- Years of service: 1975–1977; 1980–1982; 1994–present
- Rank: Lieutenant colonel
- Alexander Lukashenko's voice Lukashenko emphasizing the need to control what is happening in the country of in order to prevent destabilization Recorded 30 October 2020

Alexander Grigoryevich Lukashenko (Note: Russian: Александр Григорьевич Лукашенко, romanized: Aleksandr Grigoryevich Lukashenko, IPA: [ɐlʲɪkˈsandr ɡrʲɪˈɡorʲjɪvʲɪtɕ lʊkɐˈʂɛnkə]) (also transliterated from Belarusian as Alyaksandr Ryhoravich Lukashenka; (Note: Belarusian: Аляксандр Рыгоравіч Лукашэнка, IPA: [alʲækˈsand(ɐ)r rɨˈɣɔravʲit͡ʂ lukaˈʂɛnka]. In English, both transliterations from Belarusian and Russian are used, and his first name is often anglicised to Alexander.) born 30 August 1954) is a Belarusian politician who has been the first and only president of Belarus since the office's establishment in 1994, making him the current longest-tenured European president.

Lukashenko was born in Kopys. After graduating from what is now the Mogilev State A. Kuleshov University, he worked as the director of a state farm (sovkhoz) and served in both the Soviet Border Troops and the Soviet Army before embarking on his political career. In 1990, Lukashenko was elected to the Supreme Soviet of the Byelorussian Soviet Socialist Republic. Following the dissolution of the Soviet Union, he assumed the position of head of the interim anti-corruption committee of the Supreme Council of Belarus. In 1994, he won the presidency in the country's inaugural presidential election after the adoption of a new constitution. Lukashenko opposed economic shock therapy during the 1990s post-Soviet transition, maintaining state ownership of key industries in Belarus. His supporters claim this spared Belarus from recessions as devastating as those in other post-Soviet states, whose political structures devolved into oligarchic crony capitalism. Lukashenko's maintenance of the socialist economic model is consistent with the retention of Soviet-era symbolism, including the Russian language, coat of arms, and national flag. These symbols were adopted after a controversial 1995 referendum.

Following the same referendum, Lukashenko acquired increased power, including the authority to dismiss the Supreme Council. Another referendum in 1996 further facilitated his consolidation of power. Lukashenko has since presided over an authoritarian government and has commonly been labelled as "Europe's last dictator". International monitors have not considered Belarusian elections as free and fair, except for his initial win. Additionally, the government harshly suppresses opponents and limits media freedom. Eventually, this has led multiple Western governments to impose sanctions on Lukashenko and other Belarusian officials. Lukashenko's contested victory in the 2020 presidential election preceded allegations of vote-rigging, amplifying anti-government protests, the largest seen during his rule. Consequently, the European Union, the United Kingdom, and the United States ceased to recognise Lukashenko as the legitimate president of Belarus following the disputed election. Lukashenko remained in power, which eventually led to a resumption of partial diplomatic relations. His re-election in the 2025 presidential election was described as a sham by the opposition and the European parliament.

Such isolation from parts of the West has, especially in the Putin era, increased his dependence on Russia, with whom Lukashenko had already maintained close ties despite past tensions, such as the so-called Milk War in 2009, allegedly stemming from Belarus' refusal to recognise the republics of Abkhazia and South Ossetia in exchange for a $500 million loan, in the aftermath of the Russo-Georgian War. Lukashenko played a crucial role in creating the Union State, enabling Belarusians and Russians to travel, work, and study unhindered between the two countries. He also reportedly played a crucial role in brokering a deal to end the Russian Wagner Group rebellion in 2023, allowing some Wagner soldiers to cross the country's border unhindered and settle in Belarus.

== Early life, family, and education ==
Lukashenko was born on 30 August 1954 in the settlement of Kopys in the Vitebsk Region of the Byelorussian Soviet Socialist Republic. Starting with an interview given in 2009, Lukashenko has said that his actual birthday is 31 August, the same as his son Nikolai's. This caused some confusion as all official sources had said 30 August 1954 up until then. An explanation was later given that his mother had entered the hospital on the 30th in labour, but did not give birth until after midnight.

His maternal grandfather, Trokhym Ivanovich Lukashenko, was born near Shostka in the then-Russian Empire, now in the Ukrainian village known today as Sobycheve. Lukashenko grew up without a father in his childhood, leading him to be taunted by his schoolmates for having an unmarried mother. Due to this, the origin of his patronymic Grigorevich is unknown, and there are varying rumours about the identity of Lukashenko's father. The most common suggestion is that the man was a Roma passing through the region. His mother, Ekaterina Trofimovna Lukashenko (1924–2015), had given birth to another son, older than Alexander, who later died on an unknown date. Ekaterina worked unskilled jobs on a railway, at a construction site, at a flax factory in Orsha, and finally as a milkmaid in Alexandria, a small village in the east of Belarus, close to the Russian border.

Lukashenko went to Alexandria secondary school. He graduated from the Mogilev Pedagogical Institute (now Mogilev State A. Kuleshov University) in Mogilev in 1975 after four years of study. He also completed studies at the Belarusian Agricultural Academy in Horki in 1985.

== Military and early political career ==
He served in the Soviet Border Troops from 1975 to 1977, where he was an instructor of the political department of military unit No. 2187 of the Western Frontier District in Brest, and in the Soviet Army from 1980 to 1982. In addition, he led an All-Union Leninist Young Communist League (Komsomol) chapter in Mogilev from 1977 to 1978. While in the Soviet Army, Lukashenko served as a deputy political officer at the 120th Guards Motor Rifle Division, which was based in Minsk.

In 1979, he joined the ranks of the Communist Party of the Soviet Union and the Communist Party of Byelorussia. After leaving the military, he became the deputy chairman of a collective farm in 1982 and in 1985. In 1987, he was appointed as the director of the Gorodets state farm in Shklow district, and in early 1988, he was one of the first in the Mogilev Region to introduce a leasing contract to a state farm.

In 1990, Lukashenko was elected a Deputy to the Supreme Soviet of the Byelorussian SSR. Having acquired a reputation as an eloquent opponent of corruption, Lukashenko was elected in April 1993 to be interim chairman of the anti-corruption committee of the Belarusian parliament. In late 1993, he accused 70 senior government officials, including Supreme Soviet chairman Stanislav Shushkevich and prime minister Vyacheslav Kebich, of corruption, including embezzlement of state funds for personal purposes. While the charges ultimately proved to be without merit, Shushkevich resigned his chairmanship due to the embarrassment of this series of events and losing a vote of no-confidence. He was in that position until July 1994.

== Presidency (1994–present) ==
=== First term (1994–2001) ===
A new Belarusian constitution enacted in early 1994 paved the way for the first democratic presidential election on 23 June and 10 July. Six candidates stood in the first round, including Lukashenko, who campaigned as an independent on a populist platform. In an interview with The New York Times, he declared, "I am neither with the leftists nor the rightists. But with the people against those who rob and deceive them." Stanislav Shushkevich and Vyacheslav Kebich also ran, with the latter regarded as the clear favourite. Lukashenko won 45.1% of the vote while Kebich received 17.4%, Zianon Pazniak received 12.9% and Shushkevich, along with two other candidates, received less than 10% of the cast votes.

Lukashenko won the second round of the election on 10 July with 80.1% of the vote. The presidential inauguration was held in the halls of the Government House on 20 July 1994, exactly ten days after the election, during a special meeting of the parliament, the Supreme Council. Shortly after his inauguration, he addressed the State Duma of the Russian Federation in Moscow, proposing a new Union of Slavic states, which would culminate in the creation of the Union of Russia and Belarus in 1999.

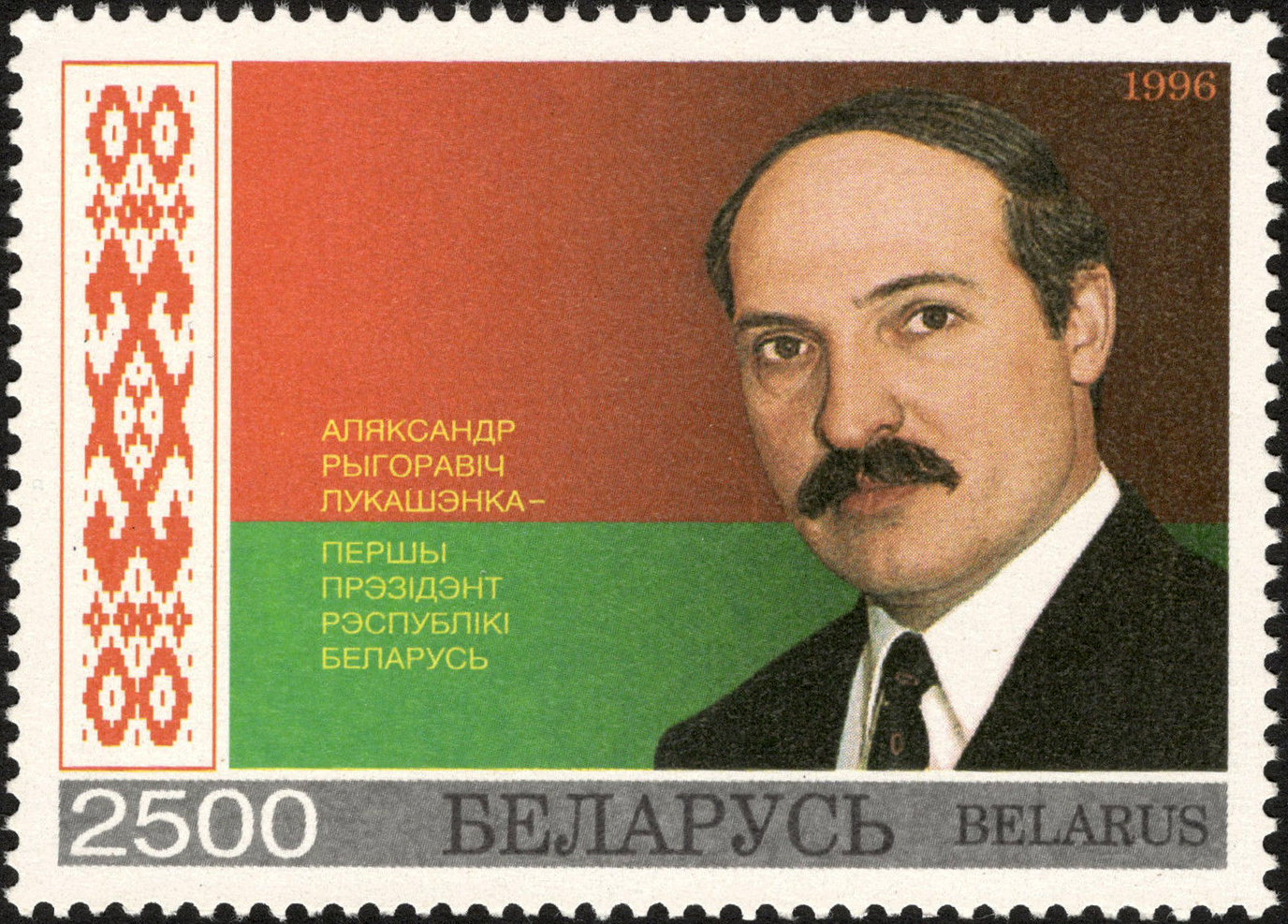
President Lukashenko on a postage stamp from 1996

In February 1995, Lukashenko announced his intention to hold a referendum. For the young democratic republic, this raised the controversial issue of the Russification of Belarus. Lukashenko said he would press ahead with the referendum regardless of opposition in the Supreme Council and threatened to suspend its activities if it did not agree to hold the referendum. On 11 April 1995, a vote was held in parliament on calling a referendum on four issues proposed by Lukashenko: 1) granting Russian the status of a state language, 2) changing state symbols, 3) on economic integration with Russia, and 4) on giving the president the right to dissolve parliament. The deputies rejected all the issues, except for that which regarded economic integration with Russia. It is unclear whether the president had legal power to call referendums independently, and if so, whether they would be binding. Lukashenko stated that the referendum would be held despite the rejection by the deputies.

In protest, 19 out of a total of 238 deputies of the Belarusian Popular Front led by Zianon Pazniak and the Belarusian Social Democratic Assembly led by Oleg Trusov (b. Алег Анатолевіч Трусаў) began a hunger strike in the parliamentary meeting room and stayed there overnight on the night of 11–12 April. At night, under the pretext of a bomb threat, unidentified law enforcement personnel attacked and forcibly expelled the deputies. Lukashenko stated that he personally ordered the evacuation for security purposes. The Supreme Council agreed to hold the referendum on 13 April, and in May 1995, Belarusian authorities held a referendum on the four issues. The Parliamentary Assembly of the Organisation for Security and Co-operation in Europe found neither the referendum nor the 1995 Belarusian parliamentary election, which took place in the same month, to have met the minimal requirements for free and fair elections.

Results of the disputed 1995 referendum
Question	For	Against	Turnout	Result
Do you agree with assigning the Russian language the status equal to that of the Belarusian language?	86.8%	13.2%	64.8%	Yes
Do you support the actions of the President aimed at economic integration with Russia?	87.0%	13.0%	64.8%	Yes
Do you support the suggestion about the introduction of the new State flag and State Coat of Arms of the Republic of Belarus?	78.6%	21.4%	64.8%	Yes
Do you agree with the necessity of the introduction of changes into the acting Constitution of the Republic of Belarus, which provide for early termination of the plenary powers of the Supreme Council by President of the Republic of Belarus in the case of systematical or gross violations of the Constitution?	81.4%	18.6%	64.8%	Yes
Source: Nohlen & Stöver

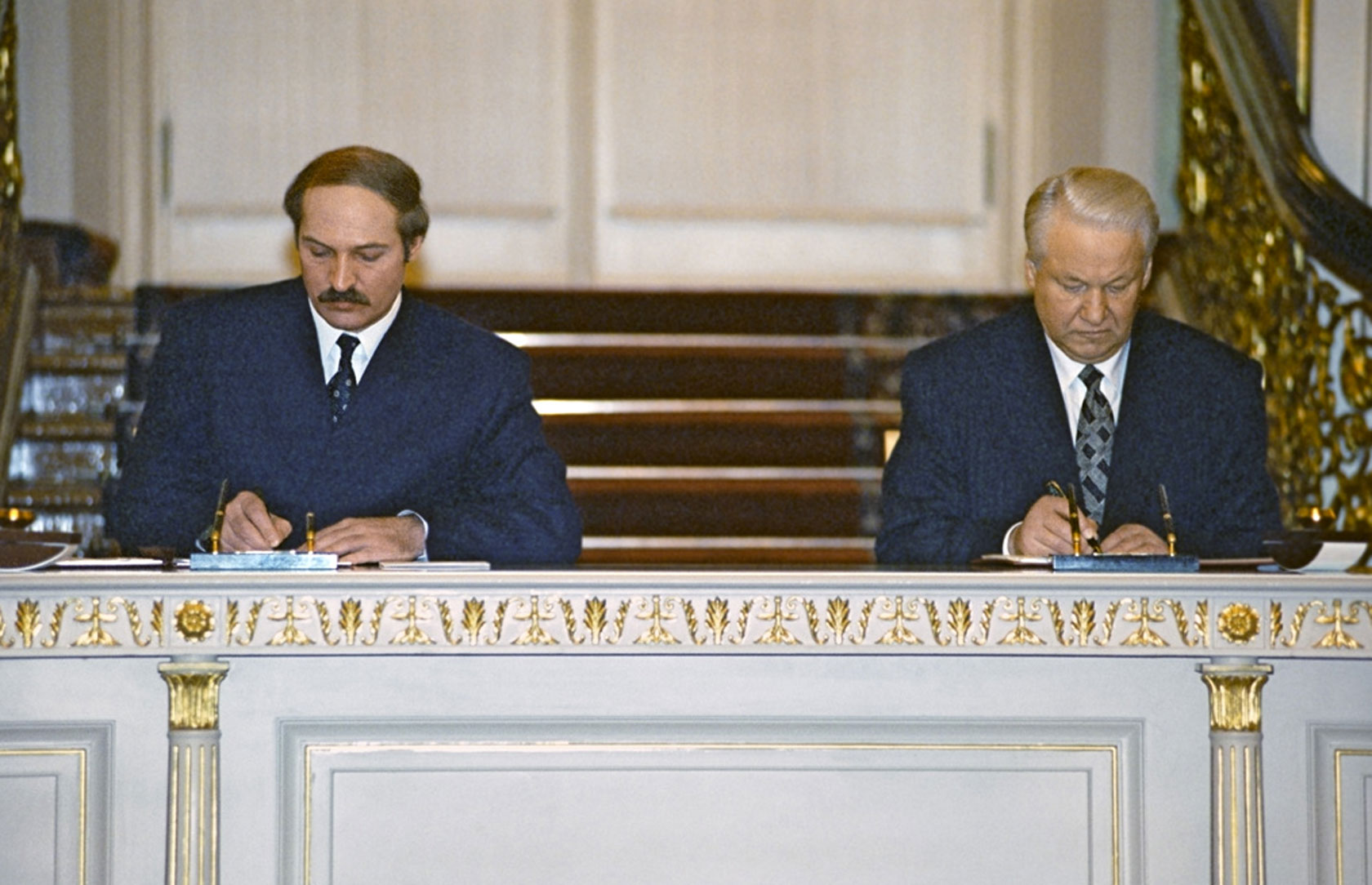
Official ceremony of signing Treaty on Establishing Russian-Belarusian Union at the Kremlin Palace, between the Russian president Boris Yeltsin and Belarusian president Lukashenko, 1997

In the summer of 1996, deputies of the 199-member Belarusian parliament signed a petition to impeach Lukashenko on charges of violating the Constitution. Shortly after that, a referendum was held on 24 November 1996 in which four questions were offered by Lukashenko and three offered by a group of Parliament members. The questions ranged from social issues, including changing the country's Independence Day to 3 July (the date of the liberation of Minsk from Nazi forces in 1944) and the abolition of the death penalty, to the national constitution. As a result of the referendum, the constitution that was amended by Lukashenko was accepted, while the one amended by the Supreme Council was voided. On 25 November, it was announced that 70.5% of voters, of an 84% turnout, had approved the amended constitution. The US and the EU, however, refused to accept the referendum's legitimacy.

After the referendum, Lukashenko convened a new parliamentary assembly from those members of the parliament who were loyal to him. After between ten and twelve deputies withdrew their signatures from the impeachment petition, only about forty deputies of the old parliament were left, and the Supreme Council was dismissed by Lukashenko. Nevertheless, international organisations and most Western countries refuse to recognise the current parliament because of the (unjust and illegal) manner in which it was formed. Lukashenko was elected chairman of the Belarusian Olympic Committee in 1997. At the start of 1998, the Central Bank of Russia suspended trading of the Belarusian ruble, which led to a collapse in the value of the currency. Lukashenko responded by taking control of the National Bank of the Republic of Belarus, sacking the entire bank leadership, and blaming the West for the currency's free-fall.

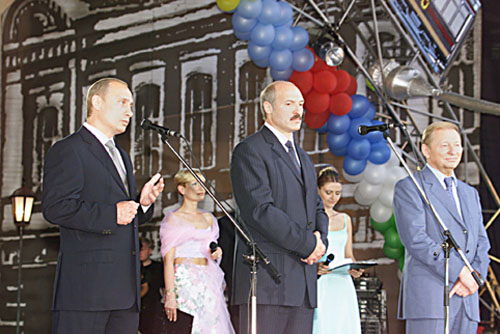
Alexander Lukashenko standing with Vladimir Putin and Leonid Kuchma at the Slavic Bazaar in Vitebsk in 2001

Lukashenko blamed foreign governments for conspiring against him and, in April 1998, expelled ambassadors from the Drazdy complex near Minsk and moved them to another building. The Drazdy conflict caused an international outcry and resulted in a travel ban on Lukashenko from both the EU and the US. Although the ambassadors eventually returned after the controversy died down, Lukashenko stepped up his rhetorical attacks against the West. He stated that Western governments were trying to undermine Belarus at all levels, even sports, during the 1998 Winter Olympics in Nagano, Japan.

Upon the outbreak of the Kosovo War in 1999, Lukashenko suggested to Yugoslav President Slobodan Milošević that Yugoslavia join the Union of Russia and Belarus.

=== Second term (2001–2006) ===
Under the original constitution, Lukashenko should have been up for reelection in 1999. However, the 1996 referendum extended Lukashenko's term for two additional years. In the 9 September 2001 election, Lukashenko faced Vladimir Goncharik and Sergei Gaidukevich. During the campaign, Lukashenko promised to raise the standards of farming and social benefits as well as increase Belarus's industrial output. Lukashenko won in the first round with 75.65% of the vote. The Organisation for Security and Co-operation in Europe (OSCE) said the election process "failed to meet international standards".

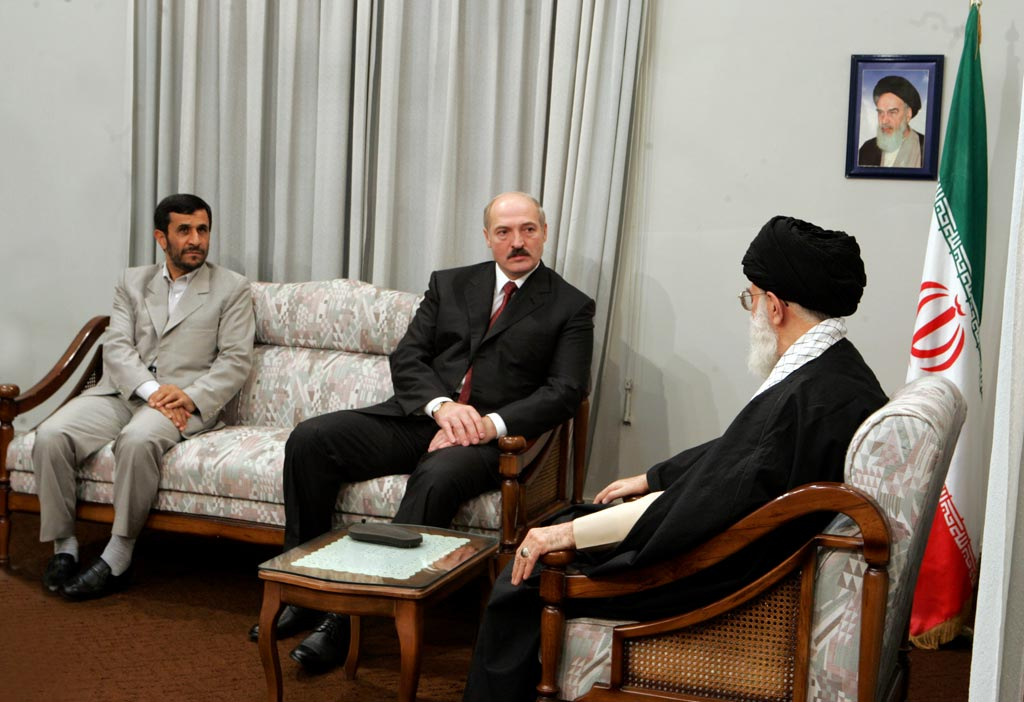
Meeting of Alexander Lukashenko with Iranian supreme leader Ali Khamenei and president Mahmoud Ahmadinejad in 2006

Jane's Intelligence Digest surmised that the price of Russian support for Lukashenko ahead of the 2001 presidential election was the surrender of Minsk's control over its section of the Yamal–Europe gas pipeline. After the results were announced, declaring Lukashenko the winner, Russia publicly welcomed Lukashenko's re-election; the Russian president, Vladimir Putin, telephoned Lukashenko and offered a message of congratulations and support.

Following the 2003 invasion of Iraq, US intelligence agencies reported that aides of Saddam Hussein managed to acquire Belarusian passports while in Syria, but that it was unlikely that Belarus would offer a safe haven for Saddam and his two sons. This action, along with arms deals with Iraq and Iran, prompted Western governments to take a tougher stance against Lukashenko. The US was particularly angered by the arms sales, and US political leaders increasingly began to refer to Belarus as "Europe's last dictatorship". The EU was concerned for the security of its gas supplies from Russia, which are piped through Belarus, and took an active interest in Belarusian affairs. With the accession of Poland, Latvia, and Lithuania, the EU's border with Belarus has grown to more than 1000 kilometers.

During a televised address to the nation on 7 September 2004, Lukashenko announced plans for a referendum to eliminate presidential term limits. This was held on 17 October 2004, the same day as parliamentary elections, and, according to official results, was approved by 79.42% of voters. Previously, Lukashenko had been limited to two terms and thus would have been constitutionally required to step down after the presidential elections in 2006. Opposition groups, the OSCE, the European Union, and the US State Department stated that the vote fell short of international standards. Belarus grew economically under Lukashenko, but much of this growth was due to Russian crude oil, which was imported at below-market prices, refined, and sold to other European countries at a profit.

=== Third term (2006–2010) ===
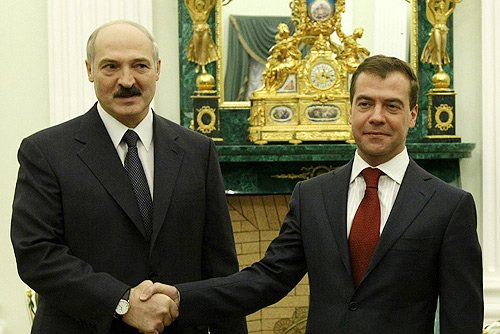
Lukashenko with Dmitry Medvedev in the Kremlin, December 2008

After Lukashenko confirmed he was running for re-election in 2005, opposition groups began to seek a single candidate. On 16 October 2005, on the Day of Solidarity with Belarus, the political groups Zubr and Third Way Belarus encouraged all opposition parties to rally behind one candidate to oppose Lukashenko in the 2006 election. Their chosen candidate was Alexander Milinkevich. Lukashenko reacted by saying that anyone going to opposition protests would have their necks wrung "as one might a duck". On 19 March 2006, exit polls showed Lukashenko winning a third term in a landslide, amid opposition reports of vote-rigging and fear of violence. The Belarusian Republican Youth Union gave Lukashenko 84.2% and Milinkevich 3.1%. Gallup, Inc., an internationally renowned US analytics company, noted that the Belarusian Republican Youth Union is a government-controlled organisation and released the exit poll results before noon on election day, even though voting stations did not close until 20:00.

Belarusian authorities vowed to prevent any large-scale demonstrations following the election (such as those that marked the Orange Revolution in Ukraine). Despite their efforts, the opposition had the largest number of demonstrators in years, with nightly protests in Minsk continuing for a number of days after the election. The largest protest occurred on election night; reporters for the Associated Press estimated that approximately 10,000 people turned out. Election observers from the Russia-led Commonwealth of Independent States (CIS) and the Organisation for Security and Co-operation in Europe (OSCE) differed on the Belarusian election.

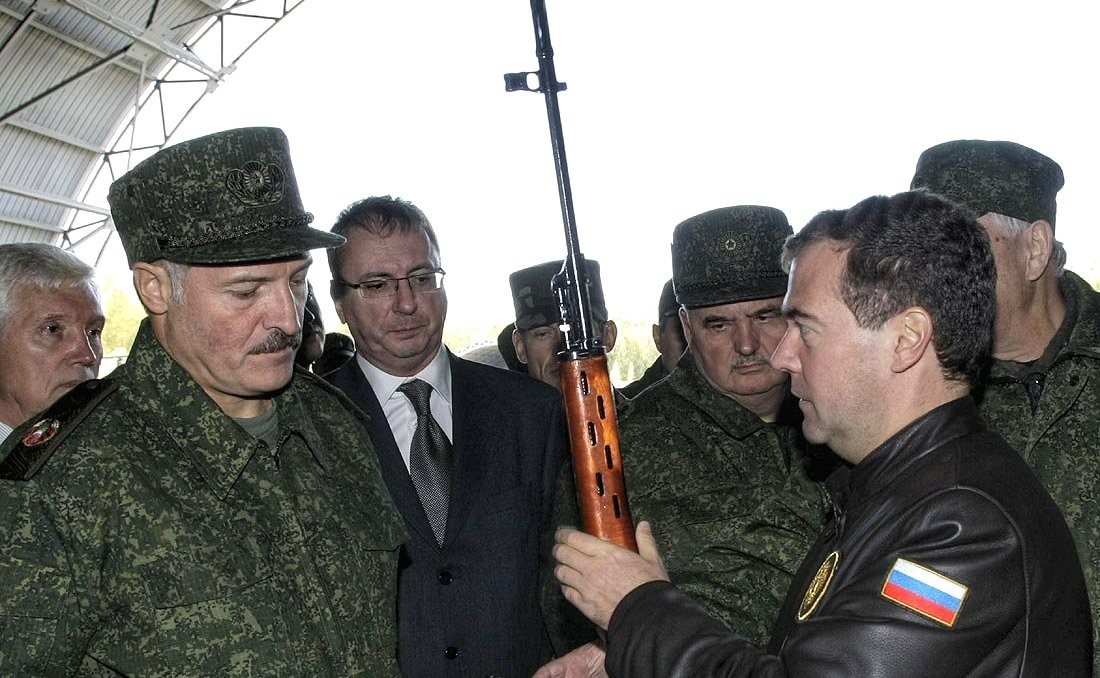
Dmitry Medvedev and Alexander Lukashenko observed the final phase of the Zapad-2009 strategic exercises that took place in Baranavichy, Belarus.

The OSCE declared on 20 March 2006 that the "presidential election failed to meet OSCE commitments for democratic elections." Lukashenko "permitted State authority to be used in a manner which did not allow citizens to freely and fairly express their will at the ballot box... a pattern of intimidation and the suppression of independent voices... was evident throughout the campaign." The heads of all 25 EU countries declared that the election was "fundamentally flawed". In contrast, the Russian minister of foreign affairs declared, "Long before the elections, the OSCE's Office for Democratic Institutions and Human Rights had declared that they [the elections] would be illegitimate and it was pretty biased in its commentaries on their progress and results, thus playing an instigating role." Lukashenko later stated that he had rigged the election results, but against himself, in order to obtain a majority more typical of European countries. Although he had won 93.5% of the vote, he said, he had directed the government to announce a result of 86%.

Some Russian nationalists, such as Dmitry Rogozin and the Movement Against Illegal Immigration, stated that they would like to see Lukashenko become President of Russia in 2008. Lukashenko responded that he would not run for the Russian presidency, but that if his health was still good, he might run for reelection in 2011.

In September 2008, parliamentary elections were held. Lukashenko had allowed some opposition candidates to stand, though in the official results, opposition members failed to get any of the 110 available seats. OSCE observers described the vote as "flawed", including "several cases of deliberate falsification of results". Opposition members and supporters demonstrated in protest. According to the Nizhny Novgorod-based CIS election observation mission, the findings of which are often dismissed by the West, the elections in Belarus conformed to international standards. Lukashenko later commented that the opposition in Belarus was financed by foreign countries and was not needed.

In April 2009, he held talks with Pope Benedict XVI in the Vatican, Lukashenko's first visit to Western Europe after a travel ban on him a decade earlier.

In August 2009, during a working trip to the Vitebsk Region, Lukashenko announced a program for the revival of Belarusian potato production, saying: "We will finish working on a special program, we will decide how many potatoes we need for the domestic market, how many potatoes we can sell" and that "we'll bring back this crop that is very valuable to us". Later, Lukashenko received the nickname "potato führer" from his detractors.

=== Fourth term (2010–2015) ===
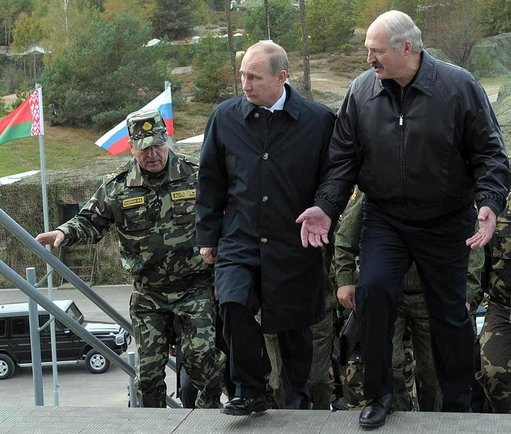
Lukashenko and Putin at the Russian-Belarusian strategic military exercises in 2013

Lukashenko was one of ten candidates registered for the presidential election held in Belarus on 19 December 2010. Though originally envisaged for 2011, an earlier date was approved "to ensure the maximum participation of citizens in the electoral campaign and to set the most convenient time for the voters." The run-up to the campaign was marked by a series of Russian media attacks on Lukashenko. The Central Election Committee said that all nine opposition figures were likely to receive less than half the vote total that Lukashenko would receive. Though opposition figures alleged intimidation and that "dirty tricks" were being played, the election was seen as comparatively open as a result of the desire to improve relations with both Europe and the US.

On election day, two presidential candidates were seriously beaten by police in different opposition rallies. On the night of the election, opposition protesters chanting "Out!", "Long live Belarus!" and other similar slogans attempted to storm the building of the government of Belarus, smashing windows and doors before riot police were able to push them back. The number of protesters was reported by major news media as being around or above 10,000 people. At least seven of the opposition presidential candidates were arrested.

Several of the opposition candidates, along with their supporters and members of the media, were arrested. Many were sent to prison, often on charges of organising a mass disturbance. Examples include Andrei Sannikov, Alexander Otroschenkov, Ales Michalevic, Mikola Statkevich, and Uladzimir Nyaklyayew. Sannikov's wife, journalist Irina Khalip, was put under house arrest. Yaraslau Ramanchuk's party leader, Anatoly Lebedko, was also arrested.

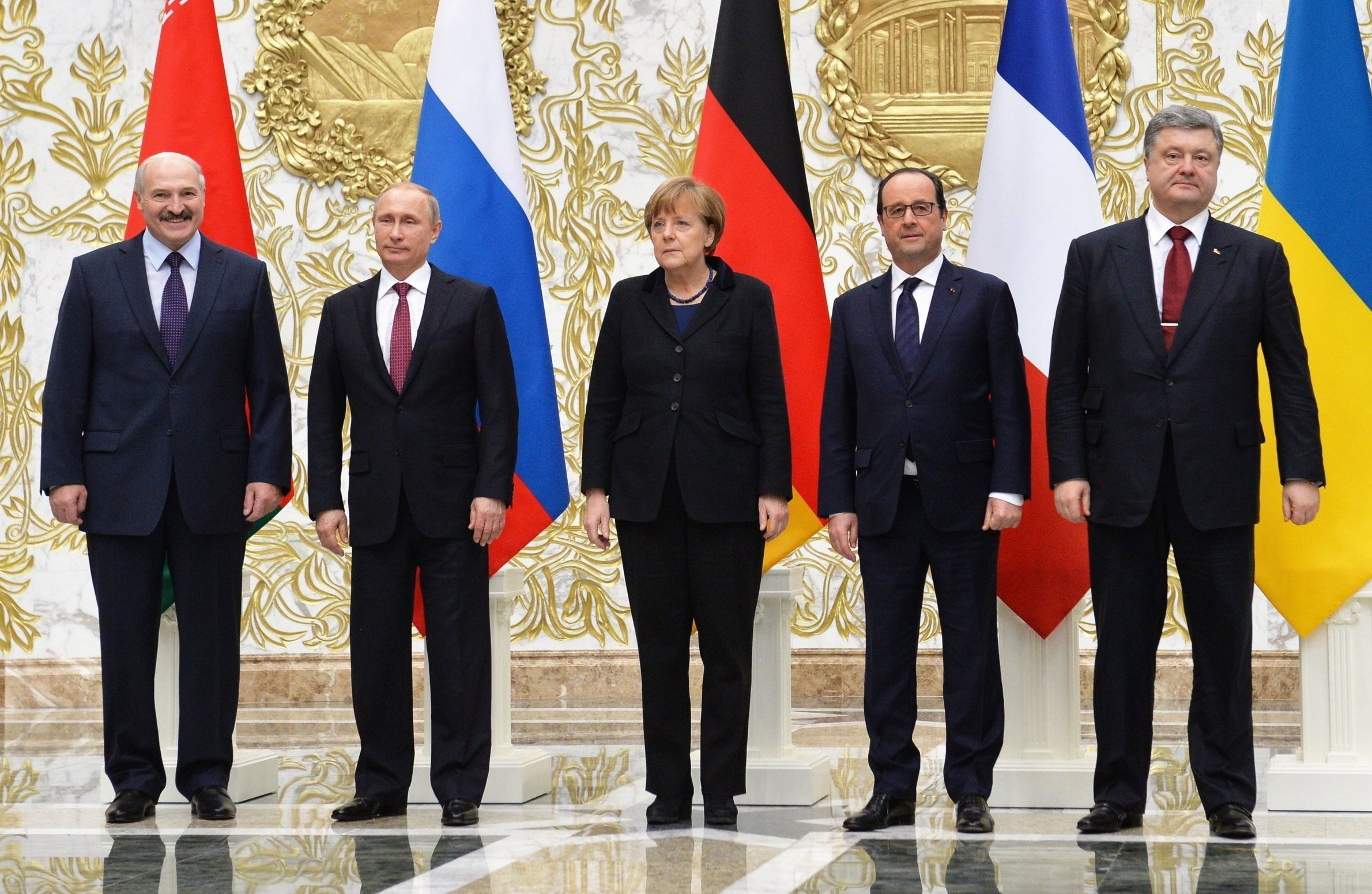
Leaders of Belarus, Russia, Germany, France, and Ukraine at the Minsk II summit, 11–12 February 2015

The CEC said that Lukashenko won 79.65% of the vote (he gained 5,130,557 votes) with 90.65% of the electorate voting. The OSCE categorised the elections as "flawed," while the CIS mission observers approved the results as legitimate. However, the OSCE also stated that some improvements were made in the run-up to the election, including the candidates' use of television debates and the ability to deliver their messages unhindered. Several European foreign ministers issued a joint statement calling the election and its aftermath an "unfortunate step backwards in the development of democratic governance and respect for human rights in Belarus."

EU ambassadors boycotted Lukashenko's inauguration ceremony of 22 January 2011, and only thirty-two foreign diplomats attended. During this ceremony, Lukashenko defended the legitimacy of his re-election and vowed that Belarus would never have its own version of the 2004 Orange Revolution in Ukraine or Georgia's 2003 Rose Revolution.

Effective 31 January 2011, the EU renewed a travel ban, prohibiting Lukashenko and 156 of his associates from traveling to EU member countries, as a result of the crackdown on opposition supporters.

Lukashenko was supportive of China's Belt and Road Initiative global infrastructure development strategy, and the inception in 2012 of the associated low-tax China–Belarus Industrial Park near Minsk National Airport, planned to grow to 112 square kilometres (43 sq mi) by the 2060s.

=== Fifth term (2015–2020) ===
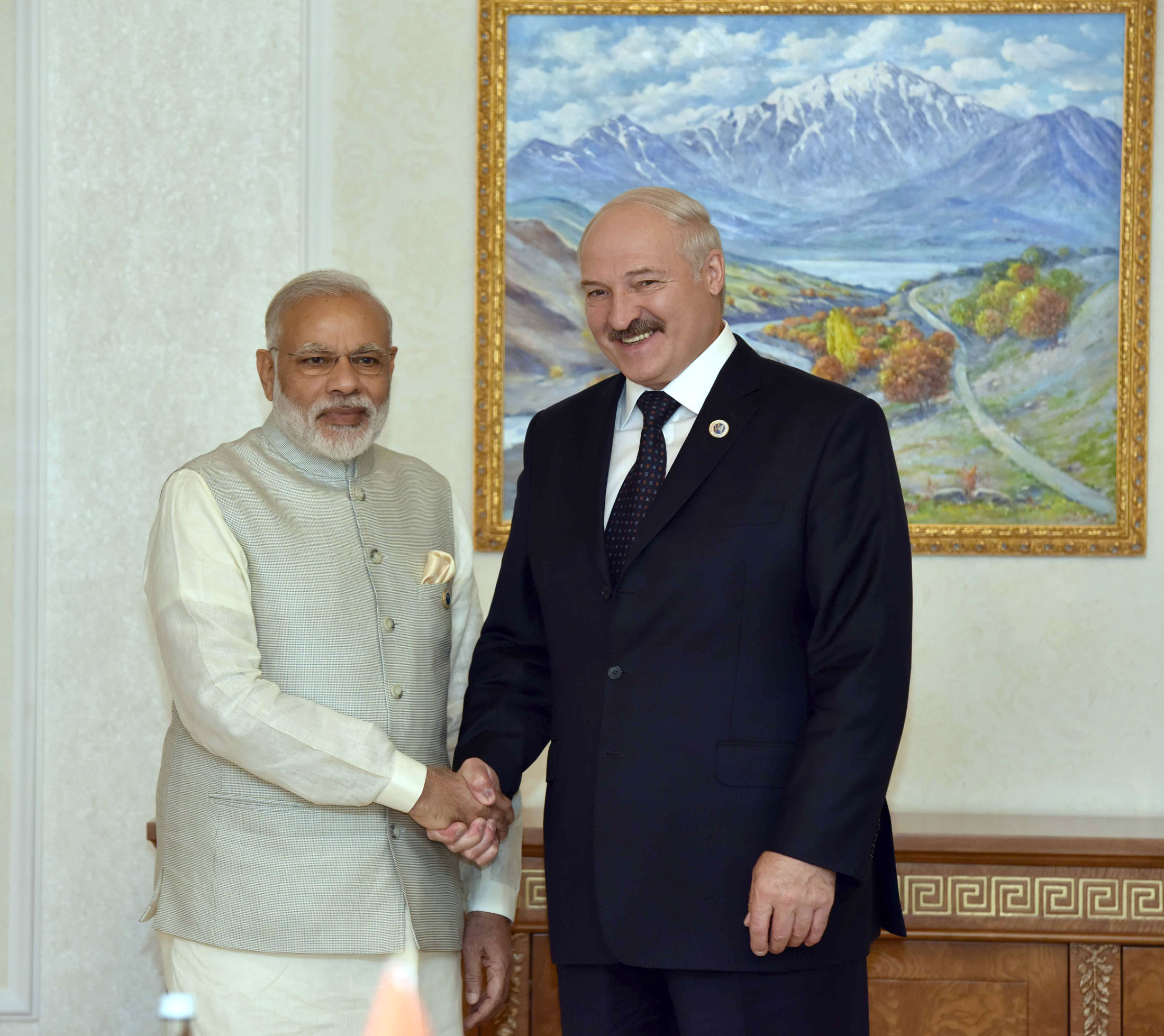
Lukashenko, during a bilateral meeting with Indian Prime Minister Narendra Modi in 2016

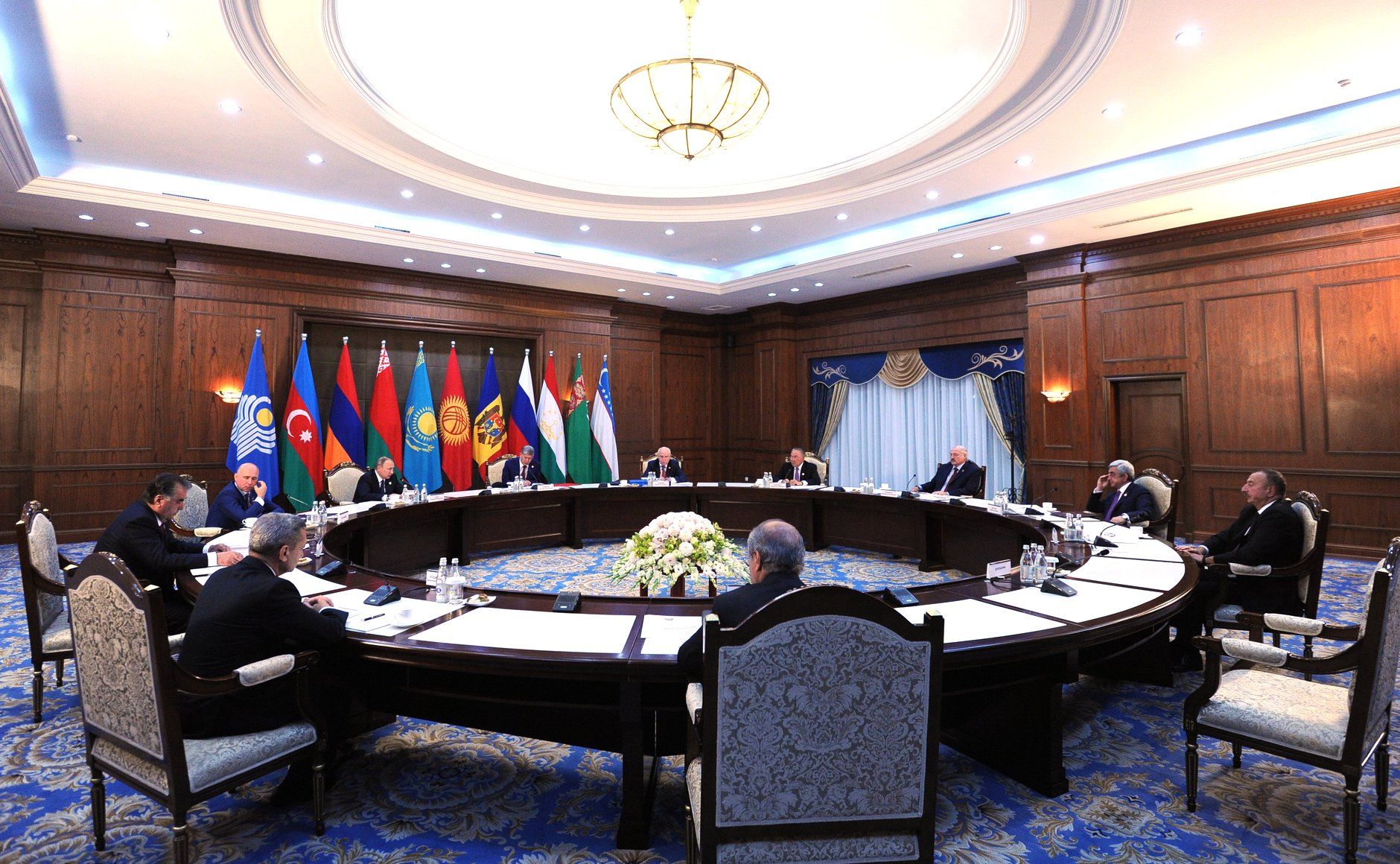
Meeting of CIS leaders in Bishkek, Kyrgyzstan, September 2016

On 11 October 2015, Lukashenko was elected for his fifth term as the president of Belarus. Just over three weeks later, he was inaugurated in the Independence Palace in the presence of attendees such as former president of Ukraine Leonid Kuchma, Chairman of the Russian Communist Party Gennady Zyuganov, and Belarusian biathlete Darya Domracheva. In mid-September 2017, Lukashenko oversaw the advancement of joint Russian and Belarusian military relations during the military drills that were part of the Zapad 2017 exercise.

In August 2018, Lukashenko fired his prime minister, Andrei Kobyakov, and several other officials due to a corruption scandal. Eventually, Sergei Rumas was appointed prime minister as successor to Kobyakov. In May 2017, Lukashenko signed a decree on the Foundation of the Directorate of the 2019 European Games in Minsk. In April 2019, Lukashenko announced that the games were on budget and on time, and eventually, he opened the 2nd edition of the event on 21 June. Between 1–3 July 2019, he oversaw the country's celebrations of the 75th anniversary of the Minsk Offensive, which culminated in an evening military parade of the Armed Forces of Belarus on the last day, which is the country's Independence Day.

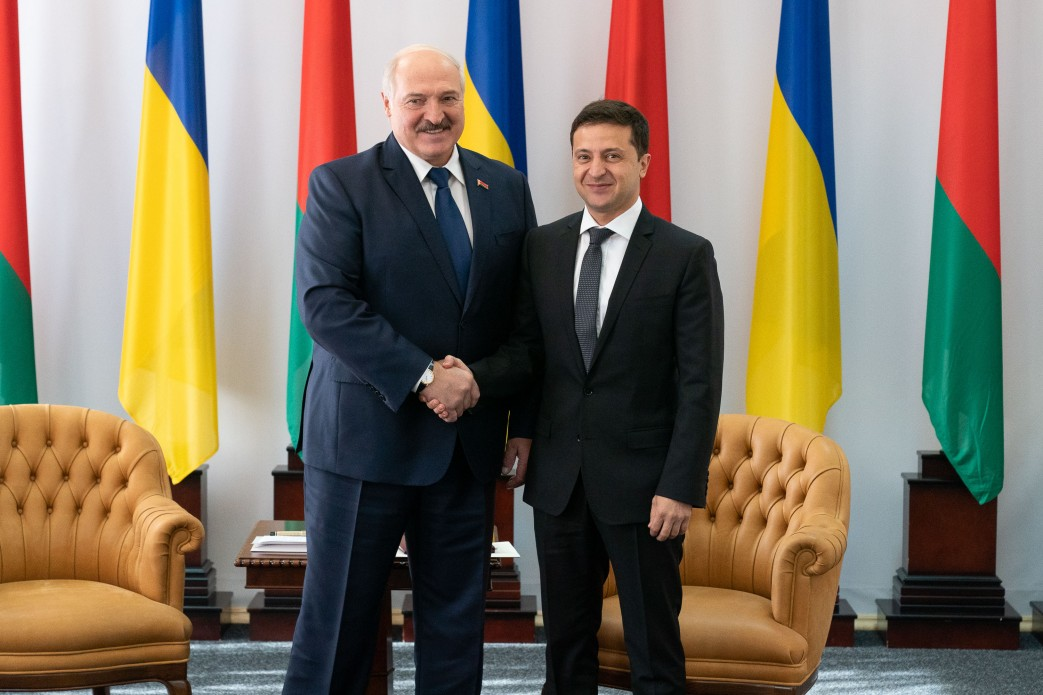
Volodymyr Zelenskyy shaking hands with Lukashenko in Zhytomyr, October 2019

In August 2019, Lukashenko met with former Kyrgyz president Kurmanbek Bakiyev, who has lived in exile in Minsk since 2010, in the Palace of Independence to mark Bakiyev's 70th birthday, which he had marked several days earlier. The meeting, which included the presentation of traditional flowers and symbolic gifts, angered the Kyrgyz Foreign Ministry, which stated that the meeting "fundamentally does not meet the principles of friendship and cooperation between the two countries." In November 2019, Lukashenko visited the Austrian capital, Vienna, on a state visit, which was his first in three years to an EU country. During the visit, he met with President Alexander Van der Bellen, Chancellor Brigitte Bierlein, and National Council President Wolfgang Sobotka. He also paid his respects at the Soviet War Memorial at the Schwarzenbergplatz.

During the course of the COVID-19 pandemic, he undertook two working visits to Russia, one of the few European leaders to undertake foreign visits during the pandemic. He also received Hungarian prime minister Viktor Orbán on the latter's state visit to Minsk. During this visit, Orbán called for an end to EU sanctions on Belarus. His first visit to Russia was to attend the rescheduled Moscow Victory Day Parade on Red Square together with his son.

=== Sixth term (2020–2025) ===
Lukashenko, with a gun, arrived by helicopter at the Palace of Independence

On 9 August 2020, according to the preliminary count, Lukashenko was re-elected for his sixth term as the president of Belarus. US Secretary of State Mike Pompeo warned that the election was "not free [or] fair".

Mass protests erupted across Belarus following the 2020 Belarusian presidential election, which was marred by allegations of widespread electoral fraud. Subsequently, opposition presidential candidate Sviatlana Tsikhanouskaya claimed she had received between 60 and 70% of the vote and formed a Coordination Council to facilitate the peaceful and orderly transfer of power in Belarus.

On 15 August 2020, Lithuanian foreign minister Linas Linkevičius referred to Lukashenko as the "former president" of Belarus. It was reported that President Lukashenko's authorities asked Kremlin representatives about the possibility of Lukashenko escaping to Russia. Furthermore, it was reported that Russia admits that Lukashenko's resignation from the post of head of state is likely.

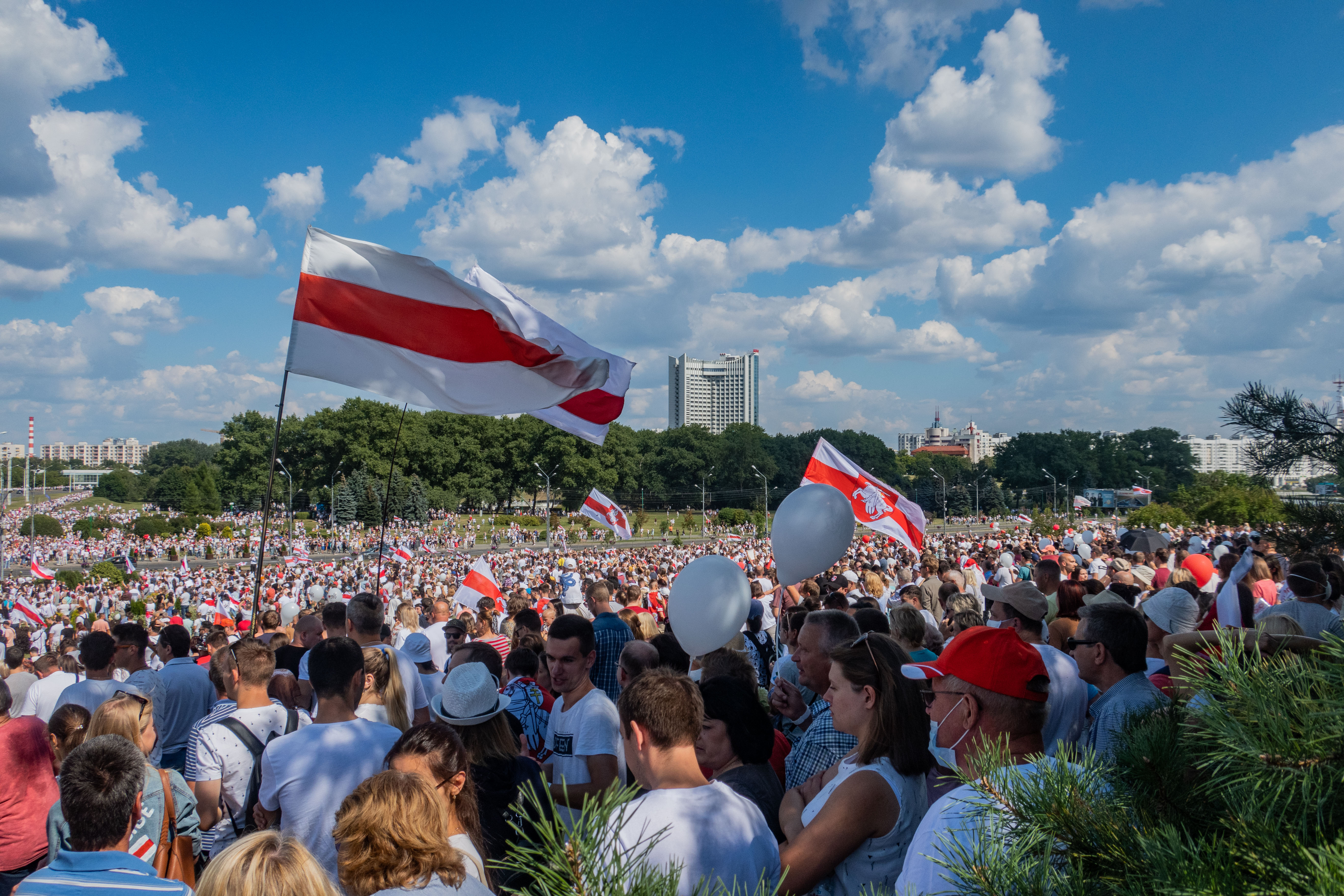
Rally against Lukashenko in Minsk, 23 August 2020

On 17 August 2020, the members of the European Parliament issued a joint statement which stated that they do not recognise Alexander Lukashenko as the president of Belarus, considering him to be persona non grata in the European Union. On 19 August, the member states of the European Union agreed not to recognise the results and issued a statement saying "The 9 August elections were neither free nor fair, therefore we do not recognise the results." The governments of the United States, United Kingdom and Canada have also refused to recognise the results. In an interview on 22 August, Josep Borrell explicitly stated that the European Union does not recognise Lukashenko as the legitimate president of Belarus in the same manner that it does not recognise Nicolás Maduro as the legitimate president of Venezuela.

On 23 August 2020, footage emerged showing Lukashenko at the Independence Palace in Minsk. In the first two videos, he is seen walking near a helicopter, wearing a bulletproof vest and holding an AKS-74U assault rifle, and then walking around the palace grounds. In the latter footage, Lukashenko was heard to say, "Leave me alone," and "There is no one left there, right?" His 15-year-old son, Nikolai, was seen with him dressed in military uniform and holding a gun.

In a third video, he is seen surveying protestors from a helicopter and is heard saying "How the rats ran away" in an apparent reference to the protesters. In a fourth video, Lukashenko was seen removing the former flag of Belarus from a flower bed, waving at security personnel, and, in reference to protesters, saying, "We will deal with them." On 30 August, the Independence Palace became again a scene of protests. When questioned about the whereabouts of Alexander Lukashenko on this day, his publicity team released an undated photograph of him walking around the grounds of the Independence Palace holding a gun.

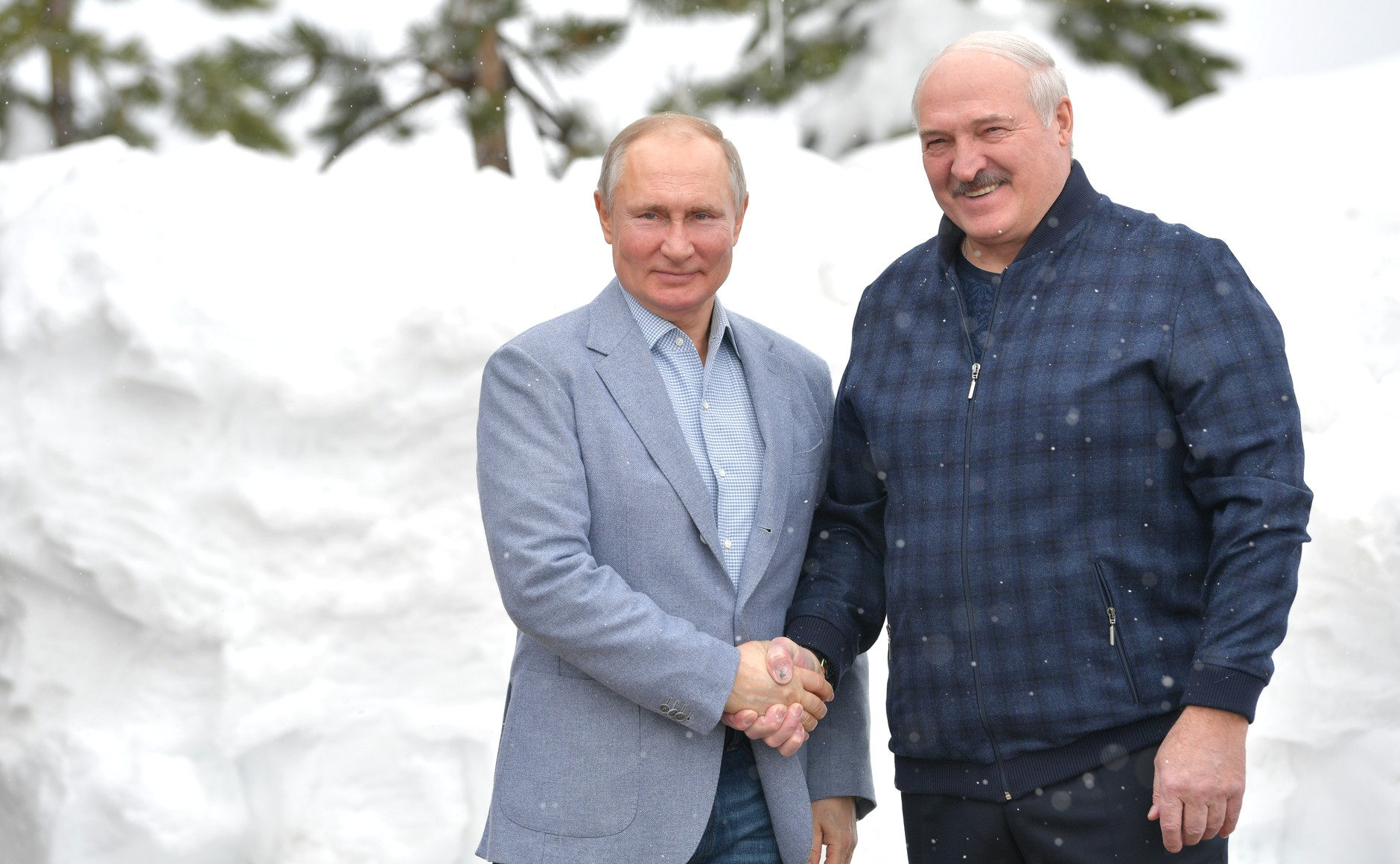
Lukashenko and Putin in February 2021

On 23 September 2020, Lukashenko was secretly inaugurated president for a sixth term in a ceremony at the Palace of Independence attended by an invited group of 700 guests.

On 27 November 2020, Lukashenko announced that he would resign once Belarus' new constitution was adopted.

In December, the executive board of the International Olympic Committee (IOC) decided to exclude until further notice all members of the Belarusian Olympic Committee from all IOC events, specifically targeting Lukashenko who was elected as its chairman in 1997.

On 17 April 2021, Russia's FSB security service exposed an alleged military coup and assassination attempt of Lukashenko. Russia also stated that it prevented Lukashenko's murder. Two suspects, who were detained at Lukashenko's request, were Alyaksandr Feduta and Yuras Zyankovich. Both are critics of Lukashenko, with the latter being a dual US-Belarusian citizen, despite Belarus not recognising dual citizenship.

On 24 April 2021, Lukashenko announced that he would sign a decree to amend emergency transfer of power. "I will sign a decree about how the power in Belarus will be set up. If the President is shot the security council will get the power." Lukashenko is the head of the Security Council himself; however, his eldest son, Victor Lukashenko, is regarded as its informal leader. This move was seen to empower his son, to be in the perfect position to succeed him in the next elections. Under current law, the prime minister assumes the presidential powers if the presidency becomes vacant, but Lukashenko said that the prime minister will only become the nominal leader and all decisions would be taken by the 20-person security council, by secret ballot.

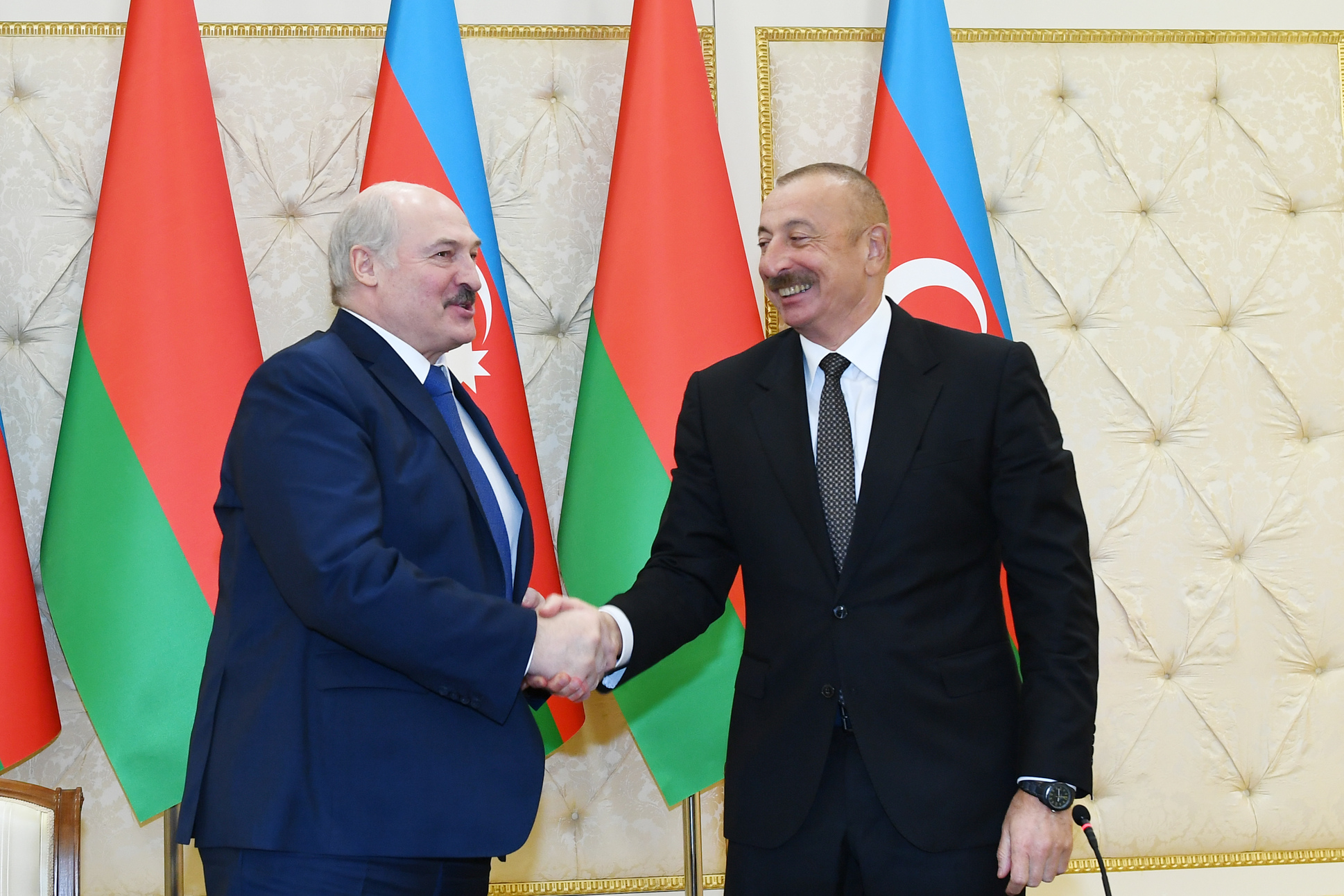
Lukashenko during a bilateral meeting with Azerbaijani president Ilham Aliyev in Baku, Azerbaijan, April 2021

On 5 May 2021, Belarusians in Germany filed a legal complaint against Lukashenko for 'state torture' and 'crimes against humanity.' If he enters Germany he risks trial or if convicted and enters Germany faces punishment given by court. Lukashenko responded that Germany was not in a position to criticise him, referring to the German Government as the "Heirs of Fascism". At the same time, he said that he will not resign, a reversal from his statement in November, but said he will call early presidential elections if and only if the United States does so as well.

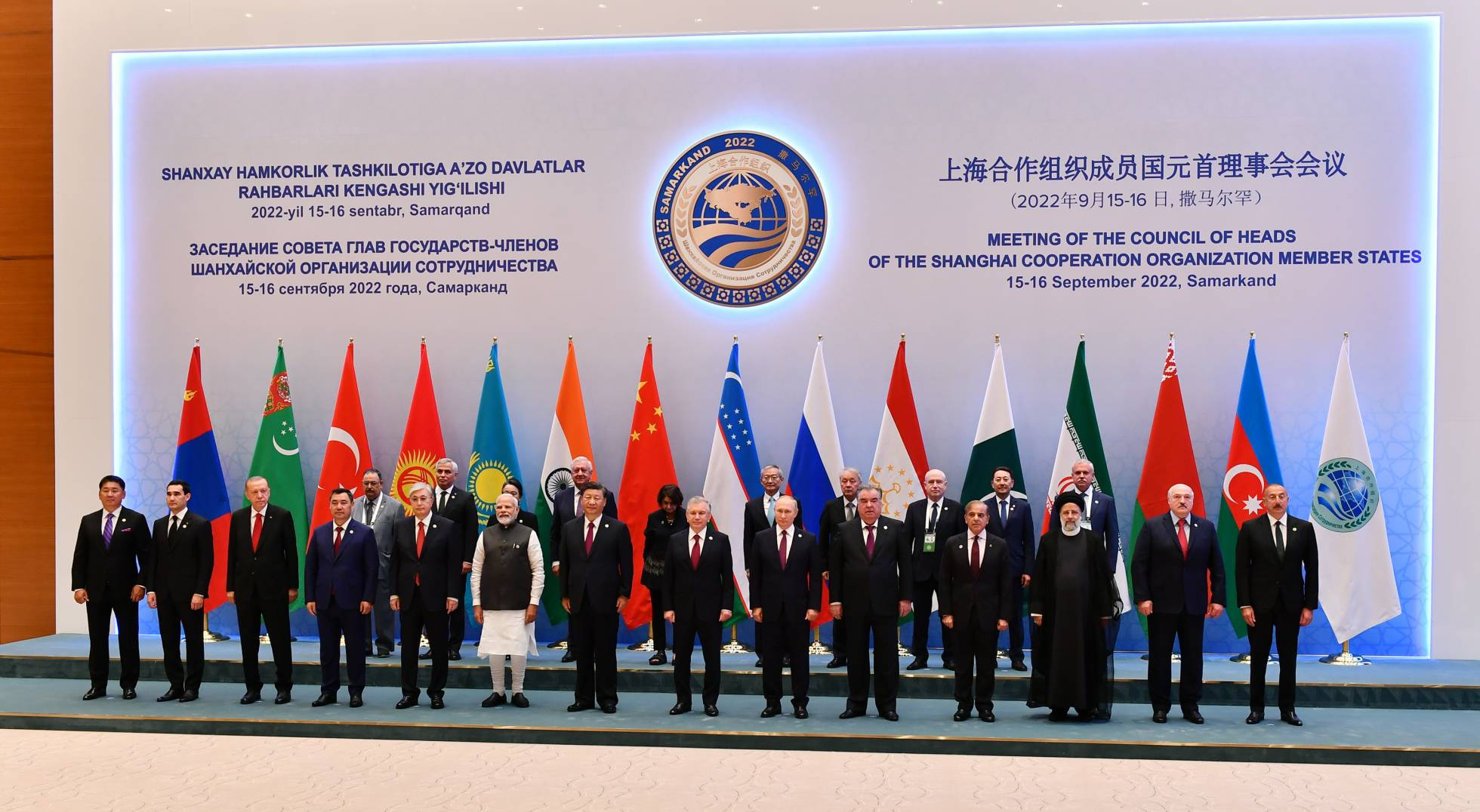
Lukashenko, Putin, Erdoğan, Xi Jinping, Modi, and other leaders at the Shanghai Cooperation Organisation summit in Samarkand, September 2022

On 9 May 2021, Lukashenko signed the decree, announced on 24 April 2021, titled "On the Protection of sovereignty and constitutional order." The contingency decree states that in the event that the president is unable to perform his duties, martial law will be immediately imposed and presidential power will be transferred to the Security Council, which is widely believed to be made up of strong allies of Lukashenko.

On 24 June 2023, Lukashenko said that with Vladimir Putin's agreement, he had negotiated with Yevgeny Prigozhin to end the Wagner Group rebellion. Lukashenko told Prigozhin that they would be squashed like bugs if they tried to enter Belarus by force and warned that Putin would never agree to remove top generals, including Defense minister Sergei Shoigu. He promised to accommodate Wagner's troops in Belarus. He claimed that Putin desired to destroy the Wagner Group after the mutiny, and that he had prevented Putin from carrying out the obliteration of the group. Lukashenko's rule in the crisis raised his clout internationally.

On 25 March 2023, Putin announced plans to install Russian tactical nuclear weapons in Belarus. On 27 September 2024, Lukashenko publicly warned that Belarus would use nuclear weapons if attacked by the West.

=== Seventh term (2025–present) ===
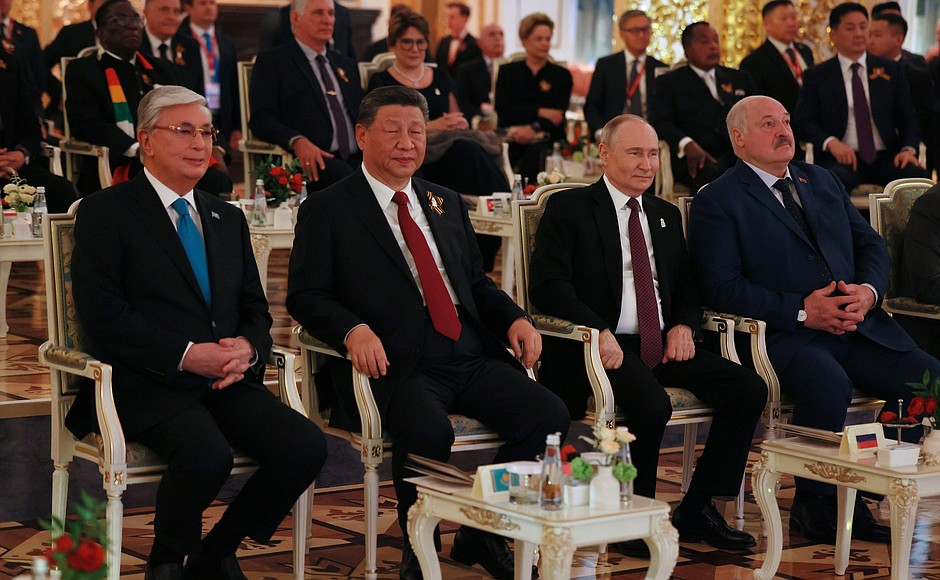
Lukashenko with Vladimir Putin, Xi Jinping, and Kazakh president Kassym-Jomart Tokayev during the Victory Day celebrations in Moscow on 9 May 2025

Lukashenko was re-elected in the 2025 Belarusian presidential election on 26 January, with official results showing that he had won around 88% of the vote. He was inaugurated for his seventh term as president on 25 March.

In April 2025, after meeting with Pakistani Prime Minister Shehbaz Sharif in Minsk, Lukashenko announced a plan to open Belarus to 150,000 migrant workers from Pakistan. Lukashenko's migration plans have raised concerns in neighboring Poland and among the Belarusian public.

In August 2025, Lukashenko announced that he was "not planning" to seek another term at the next election and also dismissed speculations of grooming his son, Nikolai, to succeed him as president.

=== Domestic policy ===
The political system created by Lukashenko has become colloquially known as "Lukashism" or "Lukashenkoism". John Sweeney summarised Lukashism as "a mutant version of the Soviet Union's deal with its people: they pretend to pay us, and we pretend to work; we pretend to vote for him; he pretends that the vote is fair."

Lukashenko promotes himself as a "man of the people." Lukashenko wanted to rebuild Belarus when he took office; the economy was in free-fall due to declining industry and lack of demand for Belarusian goods. Lukashenko kept many industries under the control of the government. In 2001, he stated his intention to improve the social welfare of his citizens and to make Belarus "powerful and prosperous."

With the ascent to power of Lukashenko in 1994, the Russification policy of the Russian Imperial and Soviet era was renewed. In 2006, Lukashenko said that people who speak Belarusian language cannot do anything, because nothing great can be expressed in the Belarusian language as it is a poor language, whereas there are only two great languages in the world: Russian and English.

Since the November 1996 referendum, Lukashenko has effectively held all governing power in the nation. Under the Constitution, if the House of Representatives rejects his choice for prime minister twice, he has the right to dissolve it. His decrees have greater weight than ordinary legislation. He also has near-absolute control over government spending; parliament can only increase or decrease spending with his permission. However, the legislature is dominated by his supporters in any event, and there is no substantive opposition to presidential decisions. Indeed, every seat in the lower house has been held by pro-Lukashenko MPs for all but one term since 2004. He also appoints eight members of the upper house, the Council of the Republic, as well as nearly all judges.

==== Economy ====
Lukashenko's early economic policies aimed to prevent issues that have occurred in other post-Soviet states, such as the establishment of oligarchic structures and mass unemployment. The unemployment rate for the country at the end of 2011 was at 0.6% of the population (of 6.86 million eligible workers), a decrease from 1995, when unemployment was 2.9% with a working-eligible population of 5.24 million. The per-capita gross national income rose from US$1,423 (equivalent to $3,172 in 2025) in 1993 to US$5,830 (equivalent to $6,927 in 2025) at the end of 2011.

One major economic issue Lukashenko has faced throughout his presidency has been the value of the Belarusian ruble. For a time it was pegged to major foreign currencies, such as the euro, US dollar and the Russian ruble in order to maintain its stability. Yet, the currency has experienced several periods of devaluation. A major devaluation took place in 2011 after the government announced that average salaries would increase to US$500. According to the World Bank, the 2011 devaluation was the largest on record for the past twenty years.

Belarus also had to seek a bailout from international sources and, although it has received loans from China, other loans, including those from the IMF, have been dependent on how Belarus reforms its economy.

Some critics of Lukashenko, including the opposition group Zubr, use the term Lukashism to refer to the political and economic system Lukashenko has implemented in Belarus. The term is also used more broadly to refer to an authoritarian ideology based on a cult of personality and nostalgia for Soviet times among certain groups in Belarus. The US Congress sought to aid the opposition groups by passing the Belarus Democracy Act of 2004 to introduce sanctions against Lukashenko's government and provide financial and other support to the opposition.

Lukashenko supporters argue that his rule spared Belarus the turmoil that beset many other former Soviet countries. Lukashenko commented on the criticism of him by saying: "I've been hearing these accusations for over 10 years and we have got used to it. We are not going to answer them. I want to come from the premise that the elections in Belarus are held for ourselves. I am sure that it is the Belarusian people who are the masters in our state."

Global Finance magazine listed Belarus as the 115th poorest country in the world in 2024.

==== COVID-19 pandemic ====
Lukashenko visited the Lida Central District Hospital in 2021, during his working visit to the Grodno region.

During the COVID-19 pandemic, Lukashenko stated that concerns about the pandemic were a "frenzy and a psychosis" and that working the tractors, drinking vodka and going to saunas could prevent people from infection from the virus. "People are working in tractors. No one is talking about the virus", Lukashenko said on 16 March 2020. "There, the tractor will heal everyone. The fields heal everyone". He also said: "I don't drink, but recently I've been saying that people should not only wash their hands with vodka, but also poison the virus with it. You should drink the equivalent of 40–50 milliliters of rectified spirit daily", but he advised against doing so while at work. Lukashenko described these comments as a joke. By early May, Belarus was reported to have 15,000 diagnosed cases, one of the highest per capita rates of infection in Eastern Europe.

On 28 July 2020, Lukashenko announced he had asymptomatic COVID-19. Neither the Presidential Administration nor the country's health service have commented on this statement.

On 12 August 2021, Lukashenko stated that he was strongly opposed to making vaccination mandatory. "There will be no mandatory vaccination in Belarus. I am strongly against it. Vaccination will remain voluntary. If a person wants to be vaccinated it is good, if not, let it be".

=== Political repression ===
==== Torture, sexual abuse and other forms of repression ====
On 1 September 2020, the Office of the United Nations High Commissioner for Human Rights (OHCHR) declared that its experts received reports of 450 documented cases of torture and ill-treatment of people who were arrested during the protests following the presidential election. The experts also received reports of violence against women and children, including sexual abuse and rape with rubber batons. According to the OHCHR, both male and female detainees were subjected to rape and other forms of sexual and gender-based violence. Medical records reviewed by OHCHR indicate lesions and other injuries to the male genitalia associated with forcible twisting and rape. Psychological violence, including threats of rape, was also used against detainees.

At least three detainees suffered injuries indicative of sexual violence in Okrestino prison in Minsk or on the way there. The victims were hospitalised with intramuscular bleeding of the rectum, anal fissure and bleeding, and damage to the mucous membrane of the rectum.

In an interview from September 2020 Lukashenko claimed that detainees faked their bruises, saying, "Some of the girls there had their butts painted in blue". In November 2021, however, Lukashenko confirmed in an interview to the BBC that people were beaten in Okrestino, saying: "OK, OK, I admit it, I admit it. People were beaten in the Okrestina Detention Centre. But there were police beaten up too and you didn't show this."

In January 2021, an audio recording was released in which the commander of internal troops and deputy interior minister of Belarus Mikalai Karpiankou tells security forces that they can cripple, maim and kill protesters in order to make them understand their actions. This, he says, is justified because anyone who takes to the streets is participating in a kind of guerrilla warfare. In addition, he discussed the establishment of camps, surrounded by barbed wire, where protesters will be detained until the situation calms down. A spokeswoman for the Interior Ministry stamped the audio file as a fake.

However, a phonoscopic examination of the audio recording confirmed that the voice on the recording belongs to Karpiankou. The Organization for Security and Cooperation in Europe expressed its concern about the remarks. According to Radio Free Europe/Radio Liberty, such a camp was indeed used near the town of Slutsk in the days from 13 to 15 August 2020. Many of those detained there are said to have been brought from the Okrestina prison in Minsk.

In March 2023, Lukashenko signed a law which allows to use capital punishment against officials and soldiers convicted of high treason.

==== Forced disappearances ====
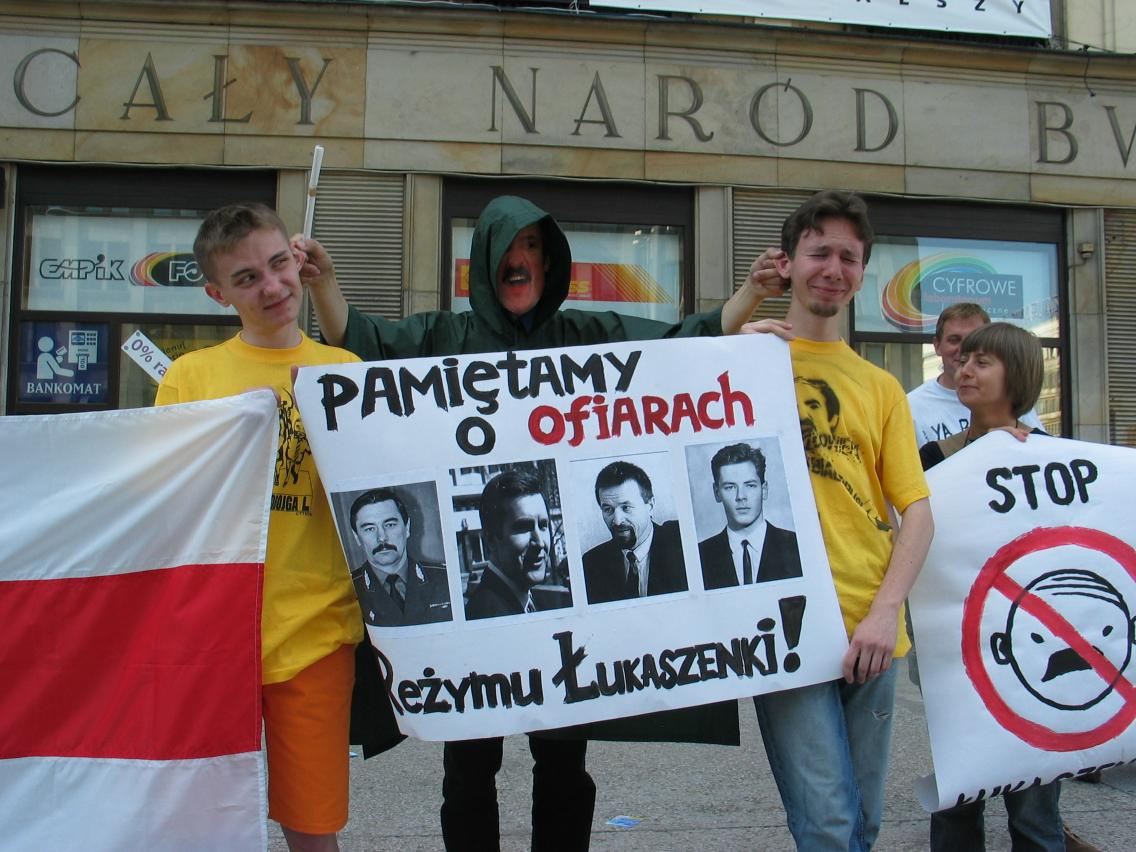
A demonstration in Warsaw in 2004, raising awareness about the disappearances of opposition activists in Belarus

In 1999 opposition leaders Yury Zacharanka and Viktar Hanchar together with his business associate Anatol Krasouski disappeared. Hanchar and Krasouski disappeared the same day of a broadcast on state television in which President Alexander Lukashenko ordered the chiefs of his security services to crack down on "opposition scum." Although the State Security Committee of the Republic of Belarus (KGB) had them under constant surveillance, the official investigation announced that the case could not be solved. The investigation of the disappearance of journalist Dzmitry Zavadski in 2000 has also yielded no results. Copies of a report by the Parliamentary Assembly of the Council of Europe, which linked senior Belarusian officials to the cases of disappearances, were confiscated.

In September 2004, the European Union and the United States issued travel bans for five Belarusian officials suspected in being involved in the kidnapping of Zacharanka: Interior Affairs Minister Vladimir Naumov, Prosecutor General Viktor Sheiman, Minister for Sports and Tourism Yuri Sivakov, and Colonel Dmitri Pavlichenko from the Belarus Interior Ministry.

In December 2019, Deutsche Welle published a documentary film in which Yury Garavski, a former member of a special unit of the Belarusian Ministry of Internal Affairs, confirmed that it was his unit which had arrested, taken away and murdered Zecharanka and that they later did the same with Viktar Hanchar and Anatol Krassouski.

==== Assassination plans on dissidents abroad ====
On 4 January 2021, the EU Observer reported that new evidence, including documents and audio recordings, provide that Belarusian secret services planned to murder dissidents abroad. An audio file, allegedly being a recording from a bugged meeting in 2012, reveals Vadim Zaitsev, the KGB chairman at the time, discussing the murder plot with two officers from the KGB's Alpha Group, an elite counter-terrorism unit. Translated from Russian, one of the voices in the recording says, "We should be working with Sheremet, who is a massive pain in the arse [inaudible]. We'll plant [a bomb] and so on and this fucking rat will be taken down in fucking pieces, legs in one direction, arms in the other direction. If everything [looks like] natural causes, it won't get into people's minds the same way." In addition to planting a bomb, they also discuss poisoning Sheremet.

==== Allegations of state-sponsored hijacking ====
On 23 May 2021, Lukashenko personally ordered Ryanair Flight 4978 en route from Athens to Vilnius, carrying the opposition journalist Roman Protasevich, to land in Belarus. The flight was forced to land at Minsk International Airport shortly before it reached the Lithuanian border after Belarusian air traffic control conveyed a report of explosives on board the plane. The flight was escorted by a Belarusian Air Force MiG-29 fighter jet. Belarusian authorities said no explosives were found and arrested Protasevich, who was placed in a list of "individuals involved in terrorist activity" the previous year for his role in the anti-government protests and incitement to public disorder. The move was condemned by opposition figures, with Tsikhanouskaya saying that Protasevich "faces the death penalty" in Belarus.

=== Foreign policy ===
==== Russia ====
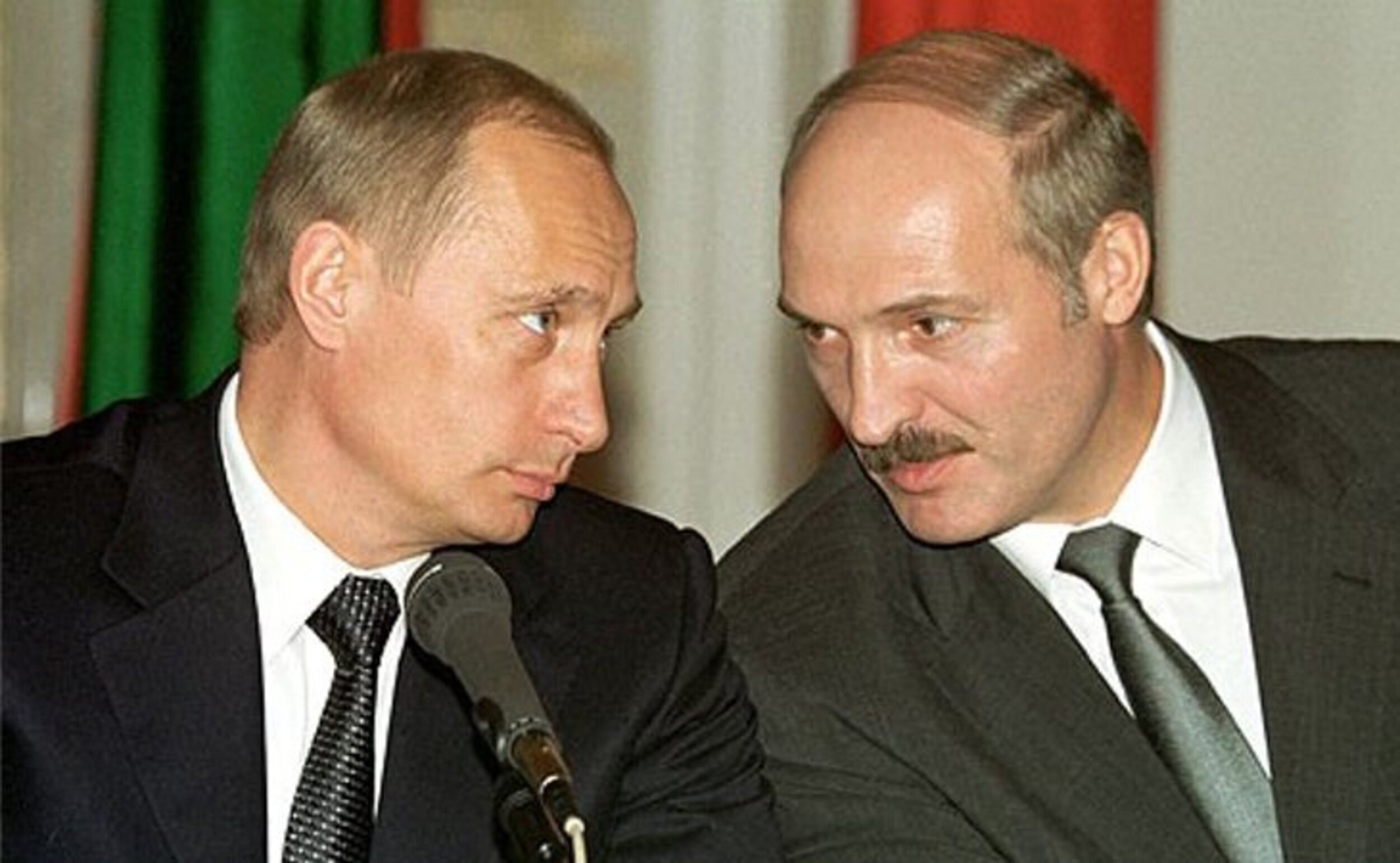
With Russian president Vladimir Putin during a news conference in 2002

In the 1990s, Lukashenko and the then-Russian president Boris Yeltsin envisaged the formation of a Union State. Yeltsin suffered from poor health and alcoholism, which induced Lukashenko into thinking that he would lead both states. But after Yeltsin anointed Putin as his successor, Lukashenko stalled the merger.

Lukashenko's relationship with Russia, once his powerful ally and vocal supporter, has significantly deteriorated. The run-up to the 2010 Belarusian presidential election was marked by a series of Russian media attacks on Lukashenko. Throughout July state-controlled channel NTV broadcast a multi-part documentary entitled "The Godfather" highlighting the suspicious disappearance of the opposition leaders Yury Zacharanka and Viktar Hanchar, businessman Anatol Krasouski and journalist Dzmitry Zavadski during the late 1990s. Lukashenko called the media attack "dirty propaganda".

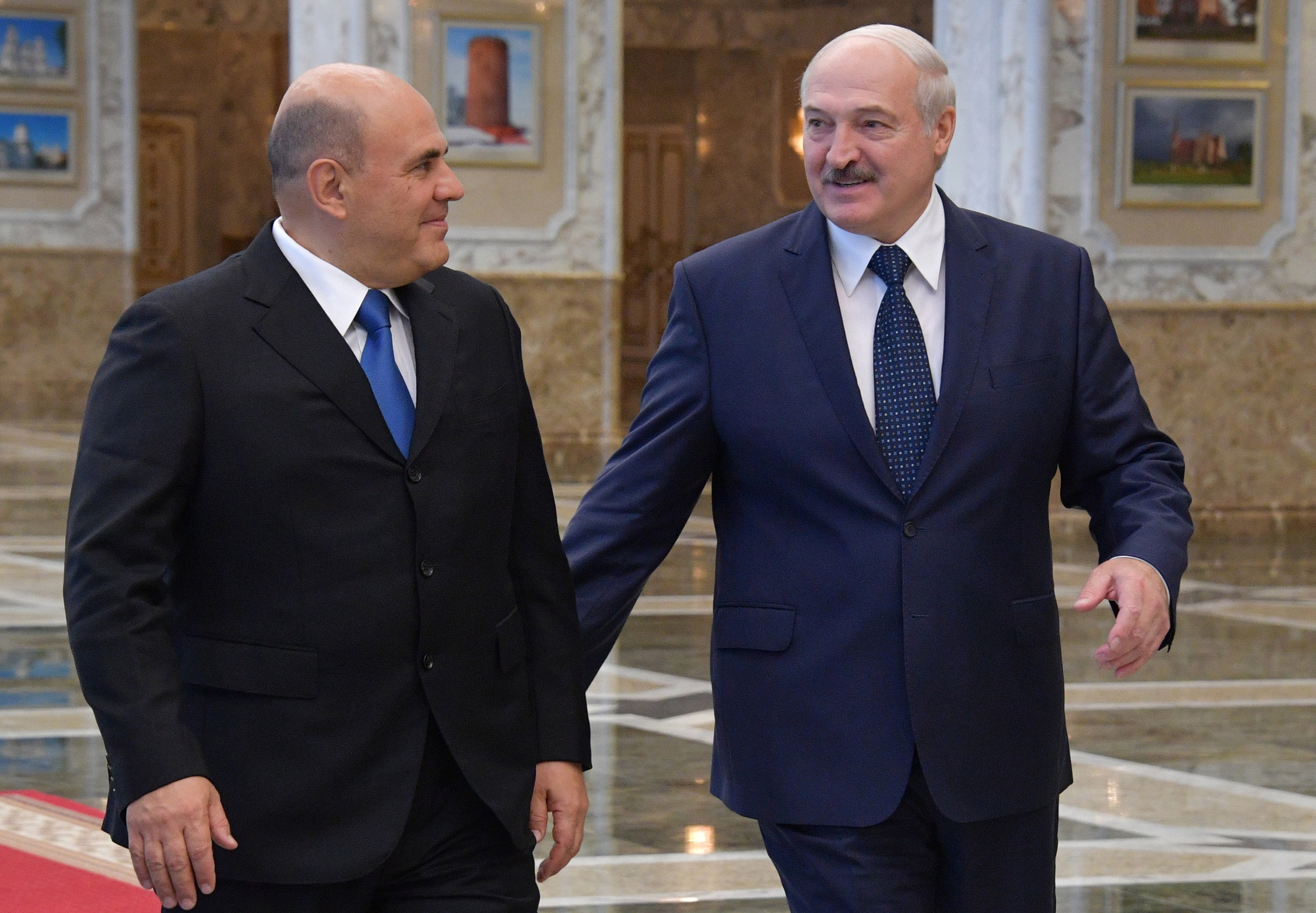
Lukashenko with Russian prime minister Mikhail Mishustin in 2020

Despite a historically good relationship with Russia, tensions between Lukashenko and the Russian government started showing in 2020. On 24 January 2020, Lukashenko publicly accused Russian president Vladimir Putin of trying to make Belarus a part of Russia. This led to Russia cutting economic subsidies for Belarus. In July 2020, the relationship between Belarus and Russia was described as "strained" after 33 Russian military contractors were arrested in Minsk.

Lukashenko afterwards accused Russia of collaborating with opposition activist Siarhei Tsikhanouski and trying to cover up an attempt to send 200 fighters from a private Russian military firm known as the Wagner Group into Belarus on a mission to destabilise the country ahead of its 9 August presidential election. On 5 August 2020, Russia's security chief Dmitry Medvedev warned Belarus to release the contractors. Lukashenko also claimed Russia was lying about its attempts to use the Wagner Group to influence the upcoming election.

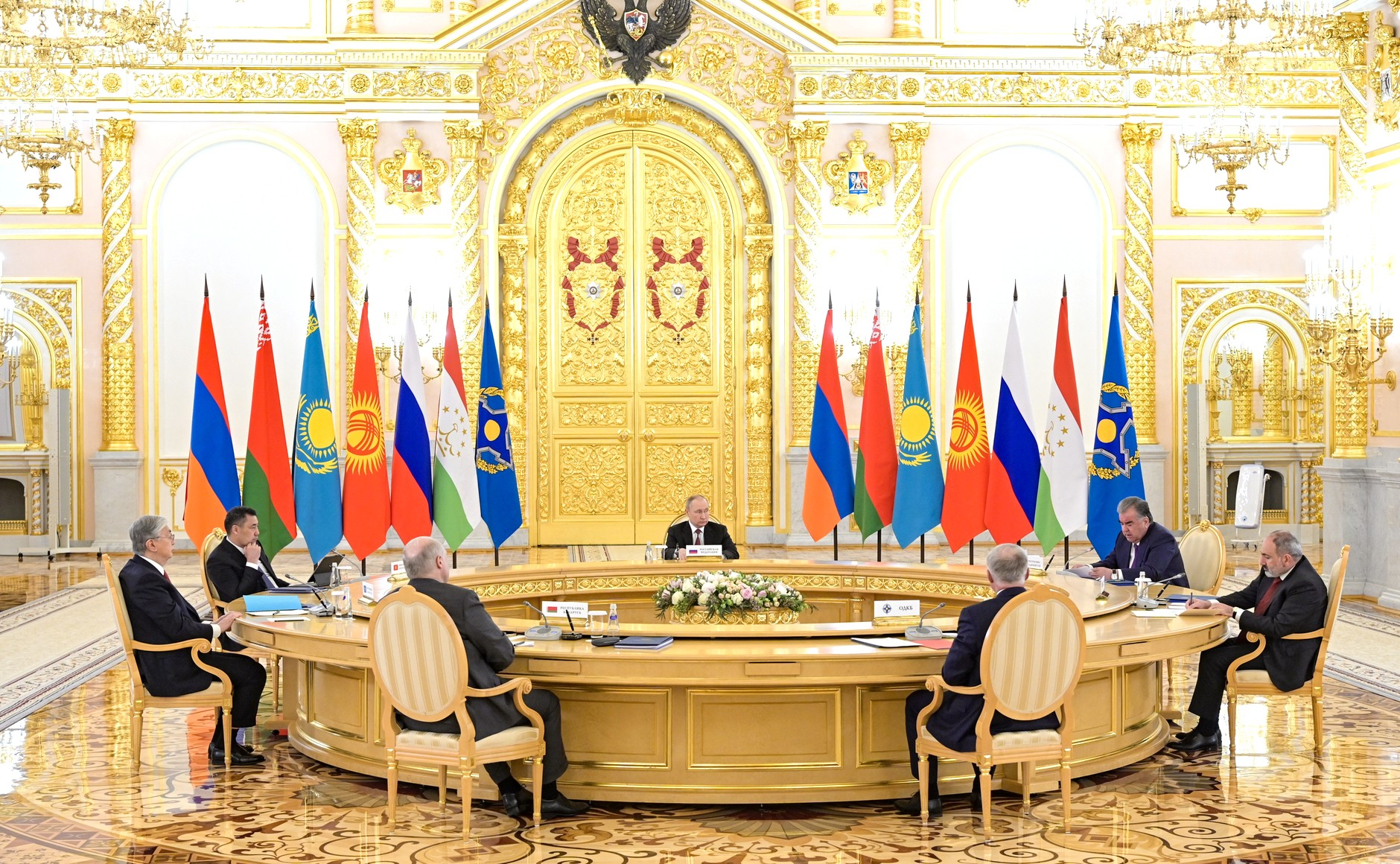
Meeting of the Russian-led military alliance, Collective Security Treaty Organization (CSTO), in Moscow on 16 May 2022

On 11 November 2021, Lukashenko raised the possibility of interrupting the Yamal–Europe pipeline carrying Russian gas to the European Union if the bloc imposes further sanctions on Belarus. Putin said that Lukashenko had not consulted him before raising the possibility of stopping gas deliveries coming from Russia to the EU via a pipeline through Belarus, adding that such a move would risk harming ties between Belarus and Russia.

In February 2022, Lukashenko permitted Russian forces to stage part of the invasion of Ukraine from Belarusian territory. Commenting on the war in Ukraine Lukashenko has said that he didn't expect the conflict "drag on this way." In June 2023, Lukashenko claimed that "the only mistake we made' was not finishing off Ukraine with Russia in 2014". In August 2024, Lukashenko urged both Russia and Ukraine to start peace negotiations, saying in an interview with Russian state television: "Neither the Ukrainian people, nor the Russians, nor the Belarusians need it. It's them in the West, who need [the war]." He accused the West of supporting Ukraine's incursion into the Kursk region.

==== European Union ====
Lukashenko's relationship with the EU has been strained, in part by choice and in part by his policies towards domestic opponents. Lukashenko's repression of opponents caused him to be called "Europe's last dictator" and resulted in the EU imposing visa sanctions on him and a range of Belarusian officials. At times, the EU has lifted sanctions as a way to encourage dialogue or gain concessions from Lukashenko. Since the EU adopted this policy of "change through engagement", it has supported economic and political reforms to help integrate the Belarusian state.

After the EU sanctioned Belarus for its crackdown against the 2020 mass protests, Lukashenko advertised Belarus as an entry point for migrants to reach the EU, resulting in the Belarus–European Union border crisis.

==== United States ====
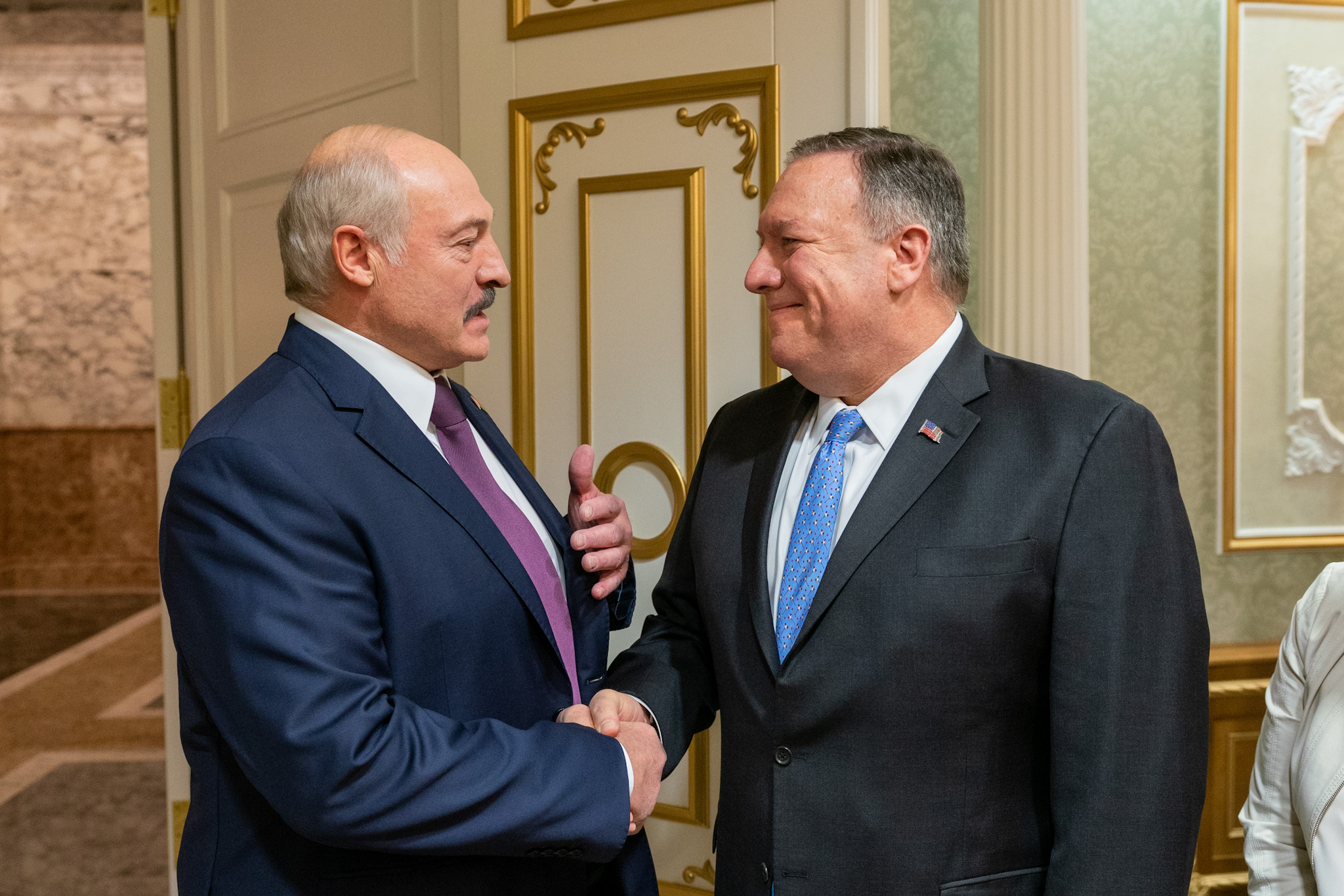
With U.S. secretary of state Mike Pompeo in 2020

In March 2003, Lukashenko said that Belarus unanimously condemned the US-led Iraq War.

On 29 August 2019, John Bolton, then National Security Advisor of the United States, was received by Lukashenko during his visit to Minsk, which was the first of its kind in 18 years.

==== China ====
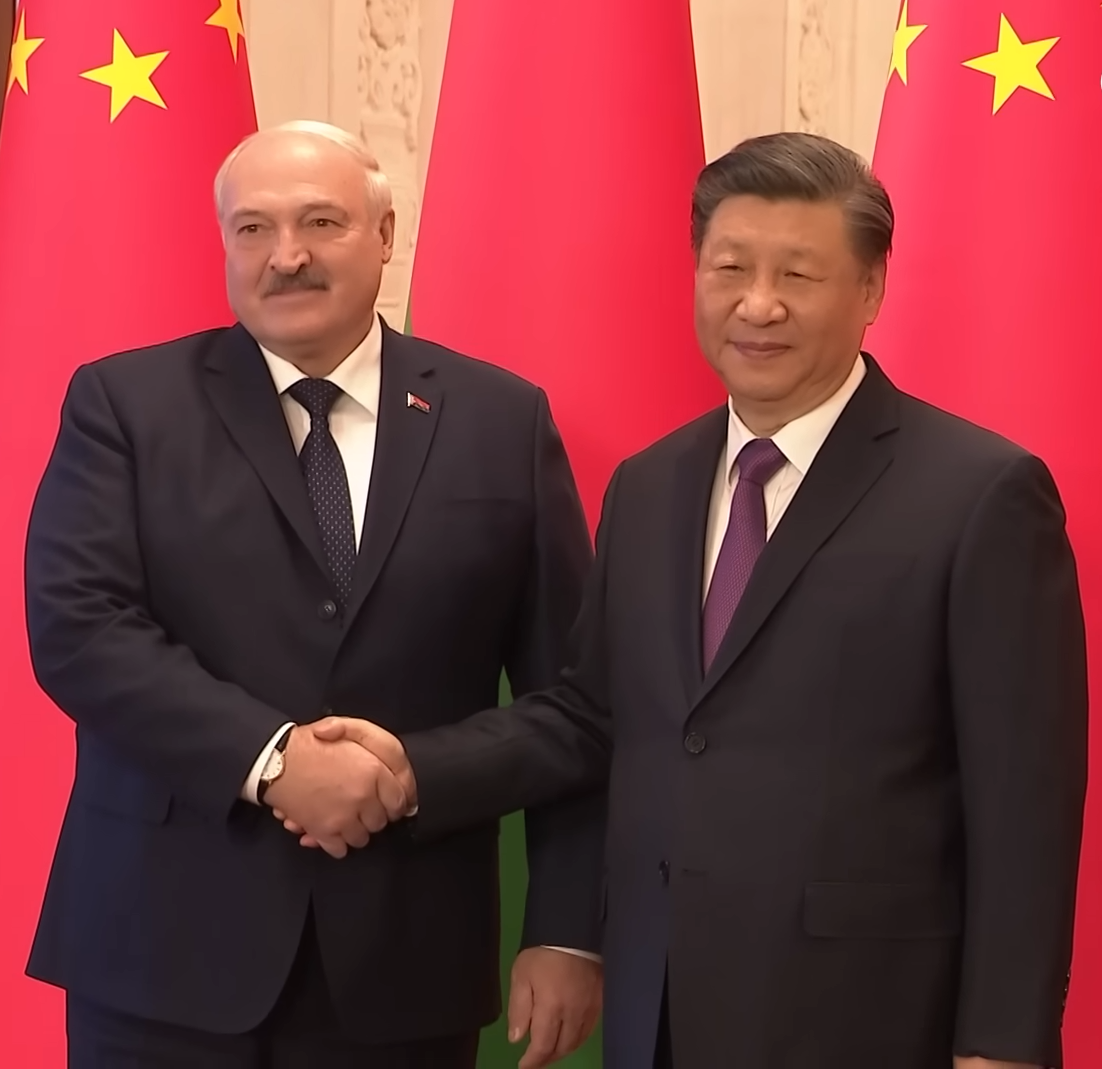
With Chinese leader Xi Jinping in 2023

Under Lukashenko, China and Belarus have maintained close ties, with him advocating an approach of "understanding China, learning from China, and approaching China." In 2012, the chairman of the Standing Committee of the National People's Congress Wu Bangguo noted that Belarus has been rapidly developing under Lukashenko. On 1 March 2023, Lukashenko met Chinese leader Xi Jinping in Beijing, which produced a range of cooperation documents on industry, trade, agricultural, and other matters.

==== Middle East ====
Following the 2014 Syrian presidential election, President Lukashenko congratulated President Bashar al-Assad. His cable "expressed keenness to strengthen and develop bilateral relations between Belarus and Syria in all fields for the benefit of the two peoples."

Belarus condemned the NATO-led military intervention in Libya, and the foreign ministry stated that "the missile strikes and bombings on the territory of Libya go beyond Resolution 1973 of the UN Security Council and are in breach of its principal goal, ensuring safety of the civilian population. The Republic of Belarus calls on the states involved with the military operation to cease, with immediate effect, the military operations which lead to human casualties. The settlement of the conflict is an internal affair of Libya and should be carried out by the Libyan people alone without military intervention from outside." They did not recognise the National Transitional Council.

Upon hearing the news regarding the death of Libyan leader Muammar Gaddafi, Alexander Lukashenko said that "aggression has been committed, and the country's leadership, not only Muammar Gaddafi, has been killed. And how was it killed? Well, if they had shot him in a battle, it's one thing, but they humiliated and tormented him, they shot at him, they violated him when he was wounded, they twisted his neck and arms, and then they tortured him to death. It's worse than the Nazis once did." He also condemned the current situation of Libya and was critical regarding the future of the country.

==== Others ====
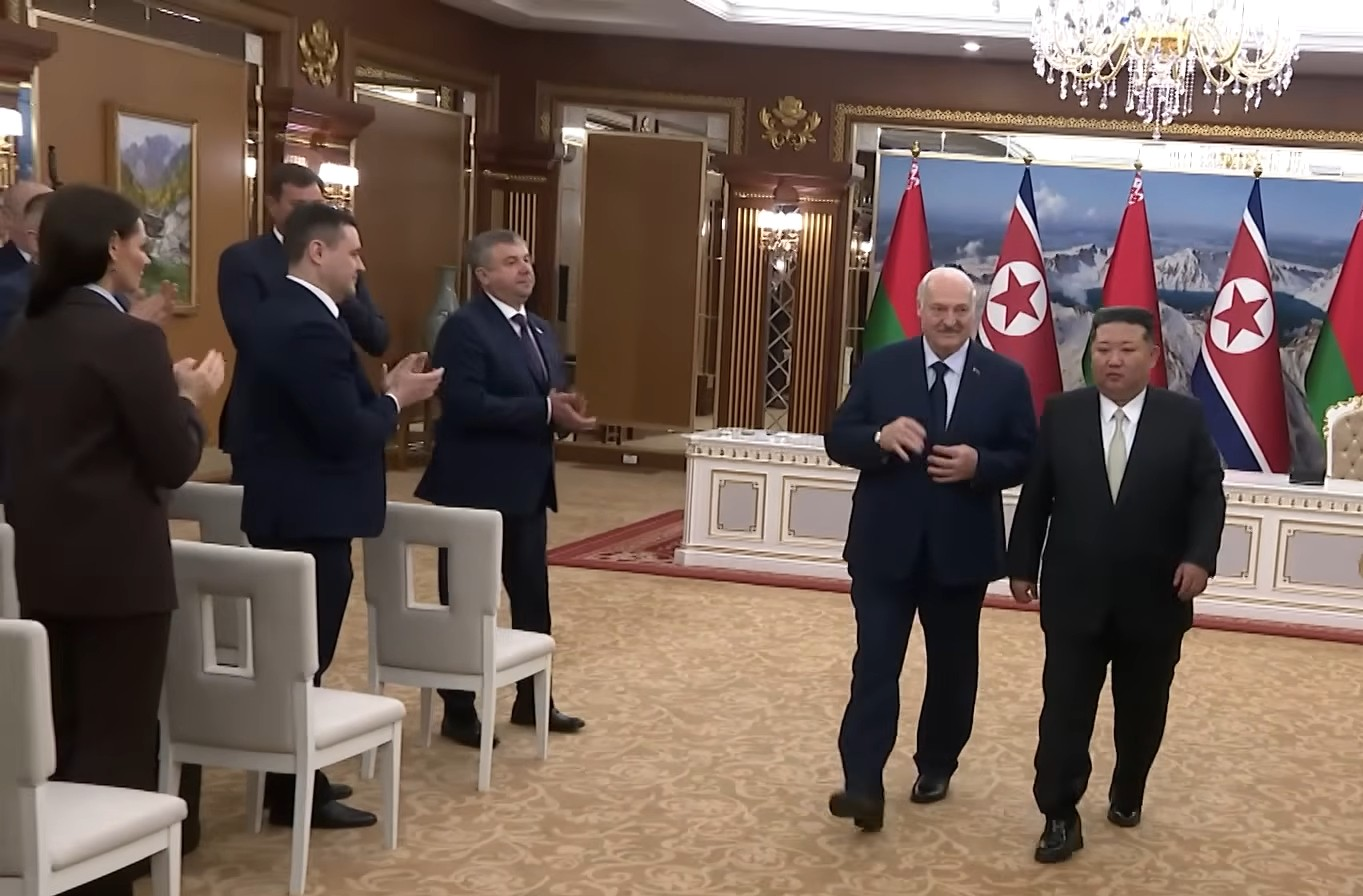
Lukashenko with North Korean leader Kim Jong Un in Pyongyang, North Korea, 26 March 2026

His policies have been praised by some other world leaders. In response to a question about Belarus's domestic policies, President Hugo Chávez of Venezuela said "We see here a model social state like the one we are beginning to create." In 2015, Lukashenko sought to improve trade relations between Belarus and Latin America.

In March 2022, Australia sanctioned Lukashenko for giving "strategic support to Russia and its military forces" in the Russian invasion of Ukraine. Also in 2022, he was blacklisted by New Zealand and Japan on the same grounds. In February 2026, Ukraine joined the sanctions against him.

In September 2023, Lukashenko, reacting to the 2023 North Korea–Russia summit, proposed a three-way cooperation pact with Russia and North Korea.

At the December 2024 summit of the Eurasian Economic Union, Armenian prime minister Nikol Pashinyan engaged in a heated argument with Lukashenko during a livestream attended by other EEU leaders after Pashinyan refused Lukashenko's invitation to visit Belarus for the next EEU summit, citing Minsk's support for Azerbaijan.

In March 2026, Lukashenko visited North Korea, marking his first state visit to North Korea, as well as the first visit to the country by a Belarusian President. He was greeted by North Korean Vice Premier Kim Tok-hun at the Pyongyang International Airport. Lukashenko visited the Kumsusan Palace of the Sun, where he laid flowers at the resting place of former leaders Kim Il Sung and Kim Jong Il. He then met with North Korean leader Kim Jong Un, and took part in a ceremony at Kim Il Sung Square. During the meeting, the two sides signed a friendship and cooperation treaty.

== Public life ==
=== Controversial statements ===
Lukashenko has made several controversial statements during his presidency which have been regarded as antisemitic, homophobic and misogynistic.

In 1995, Lukashenko made a remark in which he named Adolf Hitler as a role model for his presidential system in Belarus: "The history of Germany is a copy of the history of Belarus. Germany was raised from ruins thanks to firm authority and not everything connected with that well-known figure Hitler was bad. German order evolved over the centuries and attained its peak under Hitler. This corresponds with our understanding of a presidential republic and the role of a president in it." Lukashenko refused to take the quote back, but stated that the consequences of Hitler's leadership style in foreign policy had been bad.

In October 2007, Lukashenko was accused of making antisemitic comments; addressing the "miserable state of the city of Babruysk" on a live broadcast on state radio, he stated: "This is a Jewish city, and the Jews are not concerned for the place they live in. They have turned Babruysk into a pigsty. Look at Israel—I was there and saw it myself [...] I call on Jews who have money to come back to Babruysk." Members of the US House of Representatives sent a letter to the Belarusian ambassador to the US, Mikhail Khvostov, addressing Lukashenko's comments with a strong request to retract them, and the comments also caused a negative reaction from Israel.

Consequently, Pavel Yakubovich, editor of Belarus Today, was sent to Israel, and in a meeting with the Israel Foreign Ministry said that Lukashenko's comment was "a mistake that was said jokingly, and does not represent his positions regarding the Jewish people" and that he was "anything but anti-Semitic," and had been "insulted by the mere accusation." The Belarusian Ambassador to Israel, Igor Leshchenya, stated that the president had a "kind attitude toward the Jewish people", and Sergei Rychenko, the press secretary at the Belarusian Embassy in Tel Aviv, said parts of Lukashenko's comments had been mistranslated.

On 4 March 2012, two days after EU leaders (including openly gay German Foreign Minister Guido Westerwelle) had called for new measures to pressure Lukashenko over alleged human rights abuses in Belarus at a summit in Brussels, Lukashenko provoked diplomatic rebuke from Germany after commenting that it was "better to be a dictator than gay" in response to Westerwelle having referred to him as "Europe's last dictator" during the meeting.

After some of the initial candidates for the 2020 Belarusian presidential election were imprisoned, three women involved with the candidates, led by Sviatlana Tsikhanouskaya emerged as leading opposition against him and contested the results of the election. Lukashenko has spoken dismissively about the role of women in Belarusian society, saying that "society is not mature enough to vote for a woman" and, referring specifically to Tsikanouskaya, that "she just cooked a tasty cutlet, maybe fed the children, and the cutlet smelled nice [...] And now there's supposed to be a debate about some issues" and that the burden of the presidency would cause her to "collapse, poor thing".

In July 2021, Lukashenko was accused of making antisemitic comments during his Independence Day speech to the armed forces; saying "the Jews managed to force the world to remember the Holocaust. The entire world grovels before them and gives in to them. They are afraid to say a single word out of place" and adding "We are tolerant and likeable. We left things alone until it got to the point where others started attacking us and the memory of our efforts." The Israeli government said the comments were "unacceptable" and summoned the chargé d'affaires at the Belarus embassy in Israel.

=== Public opinion ===
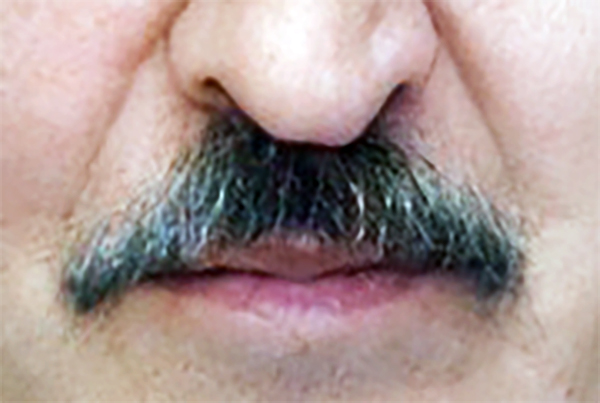
Lukashenko's trademark moustache

Independent polling is tightly restricted in Belarus. Surveys are monopolised by the government, which either does not publish its surveys or uses them for propagandistic purposes. According to a leaked internal poll, a third of the population had trust in Lukashenko. The last credible public poll in Belarus was a 2016 poll showing approximately 30% approval for Lukashenko.

Lukashenko is referred to as "Batska" (бацька, "father") by his supporters.

During the 2020–21 Belarusian protests, opponents of Lukashenko began to refer to him as "Sasha 3%" on the basis that they believed that he was only supported by three percent of the Belarusian population. The term has subsequently become a popular meme within the Belarusian opposition appearing on T-shirts and posters. Lukashenko has also been referred to as "Tarakanishche" ("Cockroach") by his opponents in reference to the poem "The Monster Cockroach", in which a moustached cockroach inflicts a reign of terror on the other animals before being eaten by a sparrow.

=== Accusations of corruption ===
A film produced by Nexta, a Belarusian media service based in Poland, accuses Lukashenko of misappropriating EU funds on residences and automobiles. The film was uploaded to Telegram and YouTube, where it had over 6 million views. Lukashenko did not comment on the film directly, but on a factory visit in March 2021 claimed that opponents were creating a fake story to destabilise the country. Lukashenko states "I want you to understand: I have been working as president for a quarter of a century, and if there were already some billions, as they say, or palaces, I would have already been torn to pieces from all sides." An EU official, Ana Pisonero, said that accusations of Lukashenko misusing EU funds for buildings and residential properties were "speculation".

== Personal life ==
=== Marriage and children ===
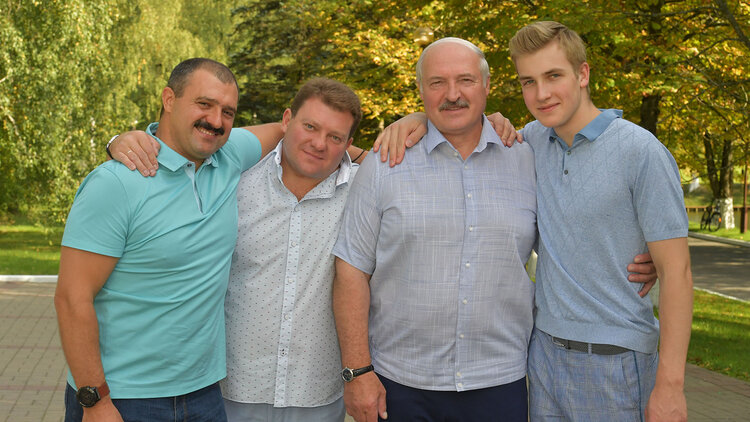
Lukashenko with his sons

Lukashenko married Galina Zhelnerovich, his high school sweetheart, in 1975. Later that year, his oldest son, Viktor, was born. Their second son, Dmitry, was born in 1980. Galina lives separately in a house in the village Shklow. Though they are still legally married, Galina Lukashenko has been estranged from her husband since shortly after he became president. In a 2014 interview, Lukashenko said that they had not lived together for 30 years and the only reason they had not divorced was that he did not want to traumatise his adult sons. Lukashenko has been seen on public occasions with various women; when asked about this in the same 2014 interview he explained that he did not want to sit with an official with a "sour face", preferring "My son on one side, and a girl on the other".

Lukashenko fathered a son, Nikolai, who was born in 2004. Though never confirmed by the government, it is widely believed that Nikolai's mother is Irina Abelskaya—the two had an extramarital affair when she was Lukashenko's personal doctor. There has never been any public statement about who Nikolai's mother is; Nikolai was raised solely by his father. It has been reported by Western observers and media that Nikolai, nicknamed "Kolya", is being groomed as Lukashenko's successor. According to Belarusian state media, these speculations were dismissed by Lukashenko, who also denied that he would remain in office for a further thirty years—the time Nikolai will become eligible to stand for election and succeed him. Lukashenko has a pet dog, a spitz named Umka.

=== Sports ===
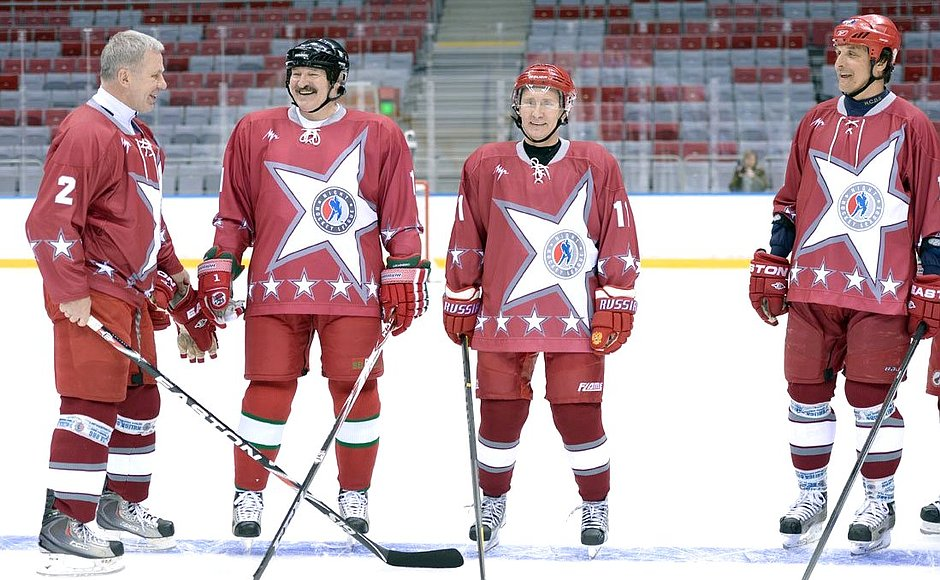
Putin on friendly hockey match in the Bolshoy ice arena, Sochi, in 2014. With him are Lukashenko, Viacheslav Fetisov and Valeri Kamensky.

Lukashenko used to play football, but stopped playing during his presidency. His two elder sons also play ice hockey, sometimes alongside their father. Lukashenko started training in cross-country running as a child, and in the 2000s still competed at the national level. He is a keen skier and ice hockey forward. In an interview he said that he plays ice hockey three times a week. He has established the Belarus President's team, an amateur team which he sometimes plays for. Numerous ice rinks intended to enable competitive ice hockey games to be played, have been built all over Belarus at Lukashenko's behest. Lukashenko was instrumental in getting the 2014 IIHF World Championship in ice hockey to be hosted by Belarus which was considered controversial due to Lukashenko's repressive regime. Belarus was supposed to host the 2021 IIHF World Championship in May 2021, but that was cancelled after international condemnation and threats by sponsors to withdraw.

=== Religion and beliefs ===
Lukashenko describes himself as an "Orthodox atheist" and has said that he believes that a president should be a conservative person and avoid using modern electronic technology such as a tablet or smartphone. He used to play the bayan, a musical instrument similar to an accordion.

== Electoral history ==
Electoral history of Alexander Lukashenko
Year	Office	Party	Votes received				Result
Year	Office	Party	Total	%	P.	Swing	Result
1994	President of Belarus	IND	4,241,026	80.61%	1st	—N/a	Won
2001	President of Belarus	IND	4,666,680	77.39%	1st	-3.22	Won
2006	President of Belarus	IND	5,501,249	84.44%	1st	+7.05	Won
2010	President of Belarus	IND	5,130,557	80.44%	1st	-4.00	Won
2015	President of Belarus	IND	5,102,478	84.14%	1st	+3.70	Won
2020	President of Belarus	IND	4,661,075	81.04%	1st	-3.10	Won
2025	President of Belarus	IND	5,136,293	87.48%	1st	+6.44	Won

== Orders and honours ==
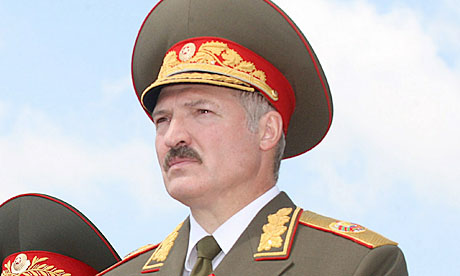
Alexander Lukashenko wearing the uniform of the commander-in-chief of the Belarusian Armed Forces in 2001

Shoulder straps of the Supreme Commander of the Republic of Belarus

=== National orders and honours ===
- Medal "In Commemoration of the 850th Anniversary of Moscow" (1997)
- Medal "Bethlehem-2000" (Palestinian National Authority, 2000)
- Order of José Martí (Cuba, 2000)
- Order of the Revolution (Libya, 2000)
- Order "For Merit to the Fatherland", 2nd Class (Russia, 2001)
- Grand Chain of the Order of the Liberator (Venezuela, 2007)
- Order of Distinguished Citizen (Caracas, Venezuela, 2010)
- Order of Francisco de Miranda, First Class (Venezuela, 2010)
- Order of the Republic of Serbia (2013)
- Presidential Order of Excellence (Georgia, 2013)
- Order of Alexander Nevsky (Russia, 30 August 2014)
- Badge of the Investigative Committee of the Republic of Belarus "For Merit" (Investigative Committee of the Republic of Belarus, 11 February 2016)
- Order of the Republic (Moldova, 4 October 2016) – as a sign of deep gratitude for the special merits in the development and strengthening of friendship, mutual understanding and cooperation in various areas between the Republic of Belarus and the Republic of Moldova and for the great personal contribution to providing significant support to our country in a difficult economic situation.
- Heydar Aliyev Order (Azerbaijan, 28 November 2016) – for special merits in the development of friendly relations and cooperation between the Republic of Belarus and the Republic of Azerbaijan.
- Order of Nazarbayev (Kazakhstan, 2019)

=== Ecclesial orders ===
- Order of St. Dmitry Donskoy, 1st Degree (by the Russian Orthodox Church) (2005)
- Order of St. Cyril (by the Belarusian Orthodox Church) (2006)
- Order of St. Vladimir, 1st Degree (by the Russian Orthodox Church) (2007)
- Order of St. Sava, 1st Degree (by the Serbian Orthodox Church) (2014)
- Order of St. Seraphim of Sarov, 1st Degree (2015) – for merits in protecting the spiritual values of the Belarusian people, maintaining church life and establishing peaceful relations between people of different faiths.

=== Municipal honours ===
- Honorary citizen of Yerevan, Armenia (2001)
- Keys to the City of Caracas, Venezuela (2010)

=== Educational honours ===
- Honorary Diploma of the Eurasian Economic Community (2006)
- Honorary Doctor of Science, Taras Shevchenko National University of Kyiv. He was deprived of his status on 7 June 2021 due to the forced landing of a Ryanair aircraft in Belarus. He became the first honorary doctor of science in the history of the university who was deprived of this title.

=== Other distinctions ===
- Winner of the international premium of Andrey Pervozvanny "For Faith and Loyalty" (1995)
- Special prize of the International Olympic Committee "Gates of Olympus" (2000)
- Medal of the International Federation of Festival Organizations "For development of the world festival movement" (2005)
- Ig Nobel Prize (Peace in 2013, Medical Education in 2020)

== Explanatory notes ==
Political offices
Preceded by Myechyslaw Hryb as Chairperson of the Supreme Council of Belarus	President of Belarus; 1994–present	Incumbent
Preceded by Office established	Member of the Supreme Council of Belarus; 1991–1994	Succeeded by Office abolished
Diplomatic posts
Preceded by Office established	Chairman of the Supreme State Council of the Union State; 2000–present	Incumbent
