= State Flag Square (Minsk) =

Square in Minsk, Belarus

Coordinates: 53.9284°N 27.5184°E

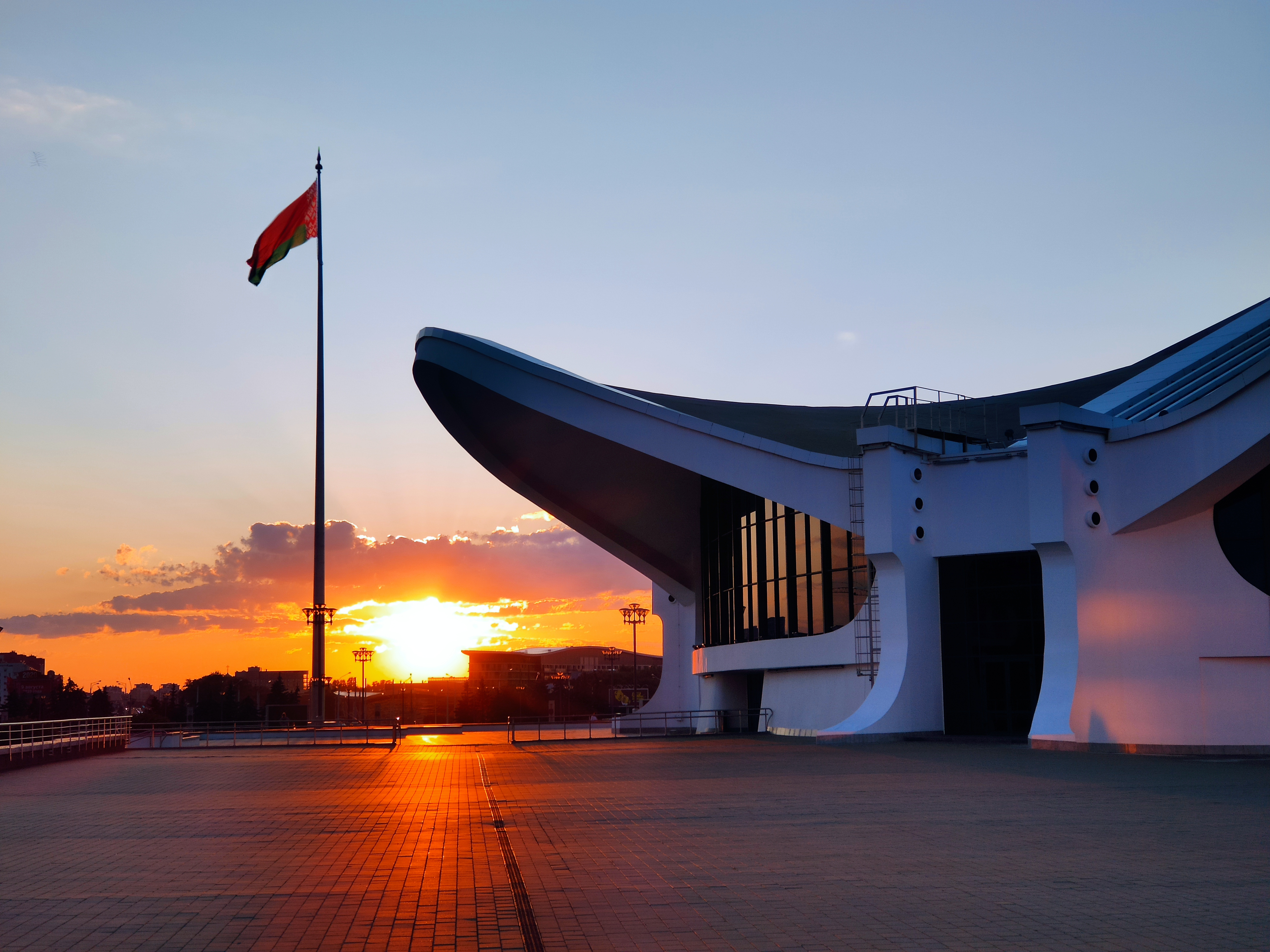

- Native name: Плошча Дзяржаўнага сцяга (Belarusian)
- Type: Square
- Location: Victors Avenue

Construction
- Completion: 2 July 2013

Other
- Designer: Anna Aksyonov

State Flag Square (Belarusian: Плошча Дзяржаўнага сцяга) is a square on Victors Avenue in the city of Minsk, the capital of Belarus. It sits between the avenue and the BelExpo Exhibition Center.

== Notable events ==
=== Inauguration of the Square ===
The Square was opened by President Alexander Lukashenko and Lao President Choummaly Sayasone on 2 July 2013, during a ceremony on the square.

=== Events of state ===
- State Flag and Coat of Arms Day celebrations.
- Patriotic events, such as Independence Day.
- Ceremonies for foreign delegations.

=== Other events ===
Many of the demonstrations during the 2020 Belarusian protests took place on the square.

== Flag ==
The state flag of Belarus, on a 70-metre (230 ft) high flagstaff, is 14 metres (46 ft) long and 7 metres (23 ft) wide. The flag is made with special waterproof fabric and weighs 25 kilograms (55 lb). The width of the flagpole is 30 centimetres (12 in) at the top, and 50 centimetres (20 in) at the bottom.

== See also ==
- National Flag Square
- List of squares in Minsk
