= Andrei Dapkiunas =

Belarusian diplomat

His Excellency Andrei Dapkiunas
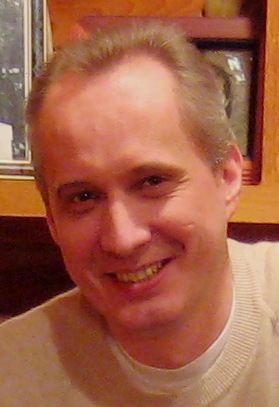

Permanent Representative of Belarus to the international organisations in Vienna and to the Organisation for Security and Co-operation in Europe (OSCE)
- Incumbent
- Assumed office 20 July 2020
- Preceded by: Alena Kupchyna

Ambassador of Belarus to Austria and Slovenia
- Incumbent
- Assumed office 20 July 2020
- Preceded by: Alena Kupchyna

Deputy Minister of Foreign Affairs
- In office 2017–2020

Permanent Representative of Belarus to the United Nations
- In office 27 August 2004 – 7 August 2017
- Preceded by: Sergey Ling
- Succeeded by: Valentin Rybakov

Personal details
- Born: 11 April 1963 (age 63) Minsk, Belarusian SSR, USSR
- Occupation: Diplomat

Andrei Vadimovich Dapkiunas (Belarusian: Андрэй Вадзімавіч Дапкюнас, born 11 April 1963, Minsk) is a Belarusian diplomat who is currently Ambassador of Belarus to Austria, Slovenia and Slovakia, Permanent Representative of Belarus to the international organisations in Vienna and to the Organisation for Security and Co-operation in Europe (OSCE). He holds the rank of Ambassador Extraordinary and Plenipotentiary since 2011.

== Background and education ==
Dapkiunas was born in Minsk in a family related to Yanka Kupala, the foremost Belarusian poet and a symbolic figure in the Belarusian national revival of the early 20th century. He holds a PhD degree in political science from the Belarusian State University (1991) and a graduate degree in languages (English and French) from the Minsk State Institute for Foreign Languages (1985). Alumnus of the London School of Economics and Political Science (Research Fee student, 1989–1990).

== Career ==
=== Early diplomatic career ===
Dapkiunas joined the Ministry of Foreign Affairs of Belarus in February 1992 and is currently among the longest-serving members of the Belarusian diplomatic service. As a junior diplomat, in 1992–1994 he had his first foreign assignment at the Permanent Mission of Belarus to the United Nations. After returning to Minsk in 1994, for more than nine years he headed the Ministry's department responsible for bilateral relations of Belarus with the US and Canada and later – with all countries of the Americas.

=== Ambassadorship in New York ===
From 2004 to 2017, he was the Permanent Representative of Belarus to the United Nations and is the longest-serving Belarusian ambassador to the United Nations. In 2011 he was briefly withdrawn from his position as ambassador to the UN following allegations of a link to one of opposition candidates in the presidential election.

While at the UN in New York, Dapkiunas served as President of the executive board of the UN Children's Fund, UNICEF (2006) and vice-president of the United Nations Economic and Social Council, ECOSOC (2008). Member of the executive board of the International Association of Permanent Representatives to the United Nations.

=== Deputy Minister of Foreign Affairs ===
From 2017 to 2020, Dapkiunas served as Deputy Minister of Foreign Affairs of Belarus. His responsibilities included multilateral diplomacy, humanitarian cooperation and relations of Belarus with countries of Africa and Asia.

=== Ambassadorship in Vienna ===
In July 2020, Dapkiunas was appointed as Ambassador of Belarus to Austria and Slovenia, Permanent Representative of Belarus to the international organisations in Vienna and to the Organisation for Security and Co-operation in Europe (OSCE).

On October 21, 2024, he was also appointed non-resident Ambassador to Slovakia.
