= Panteleimon Ponomarenko =

Soviet partisan and politician (1902-1984)

- Пантелеймон Пономаренко
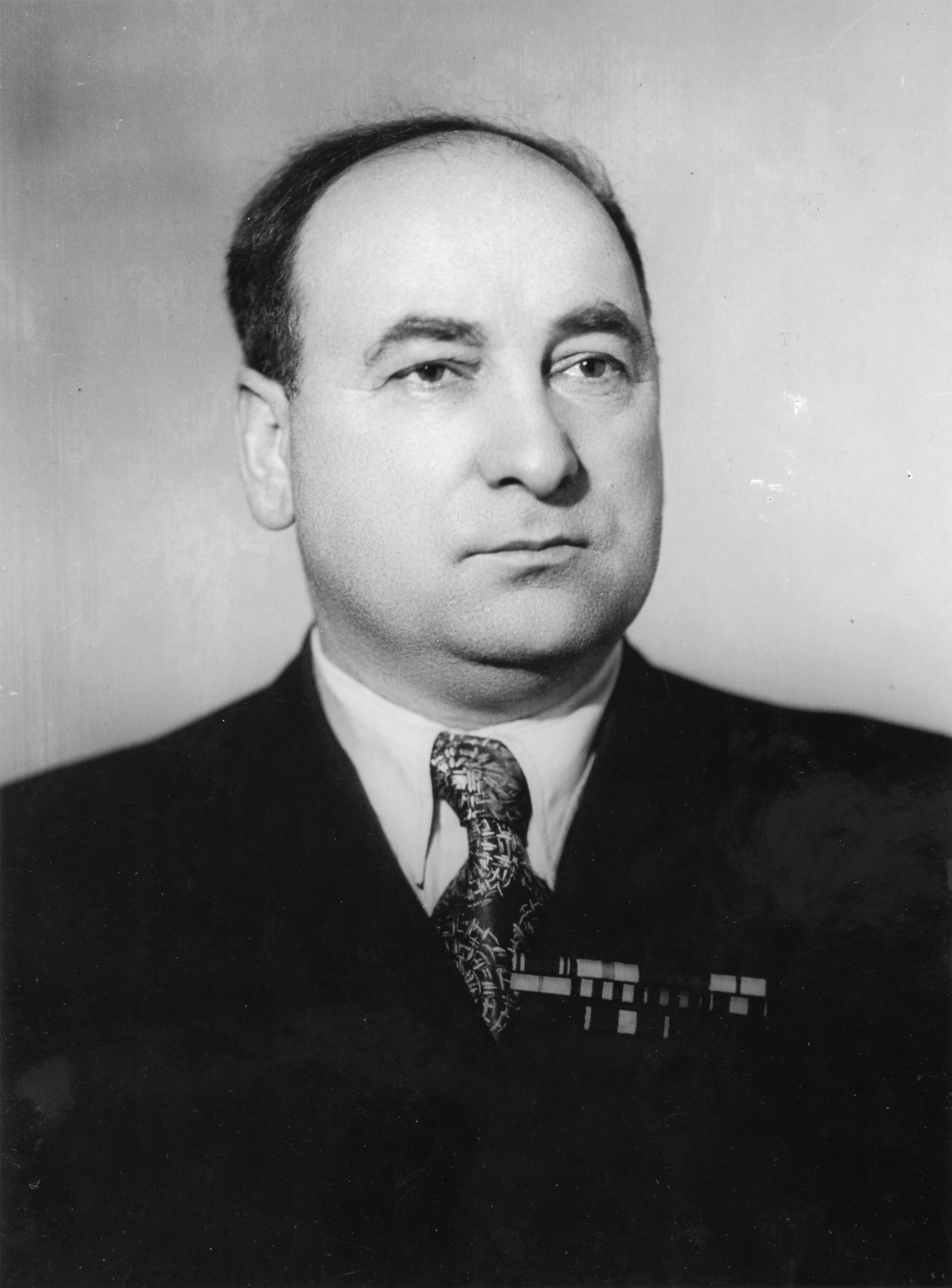
- Ponomarenko c. 1950

First Secretary of the Communist Party of Kazakhstan
- In office 6 February 1954 – 7 May 1955
- Head of state: Nurtas Undasynov; Zhumabek Tashenev
- Head of government: Elubay Taibekov; Dinmukhamed Kunaev
- Preceded by: Zhumabay Shayakhmetov
- Succeeded by: Leonid Brezhnev

Minister of Culture
- In office 15 March 1953 – 9 March 1954
- Premier: Georgy Malenkov
- Preceded by: Nikolai Bespalov
- Succeeded by: Georgy Aleksandrov

Minister of Procurement
- In office 27 October 1950 – 12 December 1952
- Premier: Joseph Stalin
- Preceded by: Boris Dvinskiy
- Succeeded by: Nikolai Ignatov

Chairman of the Council of Ministers of the Byelorussian SSR
- In office 7 February 1944 – 17 March 1948
- First Secretary: Himself; Nikolai Gusarov
- Head of state: Nikifor Natalevich
- Preceded by: Ivan Bylinsky
- Succeeded by: Aleksey Kleshchev

First Secretary of the Communist Party of Byelorussia
- In office 18 June 1938 – 7 March 1947
- Head of state: Nikifor Natalevich
- Head of government: Afanasy Kovalyov; Kuzma Kiselyov; Ivan Bylinsky; Himself
- Preceded by: Aleksei Volkov
- Succeeded by: Nikolai Gusarov
Diplomatic offices
Soviet Ambassador to the Netherlands
In office 30 June 1959 – 21 June 1962
Premier	Nikita Khrushchev
Preceded by	Stepan Kirsanov
Succeeded by	Ivan Tugarinov
Soviet Ambassador to India
In office 26 October 1957 – 22 April 1959
Premier	Nikolai Bulganin; Nikita Khrushchev
Preceded by	Mikhail Menshikov
Succeeded by	Ivan Benediktov
Soviet Ambassador to Nepal
In office 26 October 1957 – 22 April 1959
Premier	Nikolai Bulganin; Nikita Khrushchev
Preceded by	Mikhail Menshikov
Succeeded by	Evgeny Zbrodin
Soviet Ambassador to Poland
In office 8 May 1955 – 3 October 1957
Premier	Nikolai Bulganin
Preceded by	Nikolai Mikhailov
Succeeded by	Pyotr Abrasimov

Personal details
- Born: 9 August [O.S. 27 July] 1902 Kuban oblast, Russian Empire
- Died: 18 January 1984 (aged 81) Moscow, Russian SFSR, Soviet Union
- Resting place: Novodevichy Cemetery, Moscow
- Party: CPSU (from 1925)
- Education: Moscow State University of Railway Engineering

Military service
- Allegiance: Russian SFSR; Soviet Union
- Branch/service: Red Army; Soviet Partisans
- Years of service: 1918–1919; 1932–1937; 1939–1944
- Rank: Lieutenant General
- Commands: Central Headquarters of the Partisan Movement
- Battles/wars: Russian Civil War; Kuban Offensive; World War II; Invasion of Poland; Great Patriotic War; Operation Barbarossa; Belarusian Resistance
- Central institution membership: 1953–1956: Candidate member, 19th Presidium of CPSU; 1952–1953: Full member, 19th Presidium of CPSU; 1948–1953: Full member, 18th–19th Secretariat of CPSU; Other offices held: 1963–1964: Permanent Representative of the Soviet Union to the International Atomic Energy Agency

Panteleimon Kondratyevich Ponomarenko (Russian: Пантелеймо́н Кондра́тьевич Пономаре́нко, pronounced [pənʲtʲɪlʲɪjˈmon kɐnˈdratʲjɪvʲɪt͡ɕ pənəmɐˈrʲenkə]; Ukrainian: Пантелеймон Кіндратович Пономаренко; 9 August [O.S. 27 July] 1902 – 18 January 1984) was a Soviet statesman and politician and one of the leaders of Soviet partisan resistance in Belarus. He served as an administrator at various positions within the Soviet government, including the leadership positions in Byelorussian and Kazakh SSRs.

== Early life ==
Ponomarenko was born in khutor Shelkovskiy in Kuban oblast to an ethnic Ukrainian peasant family coming from Kharkov governorate. Already at the age of twelve he entered as an apprentice in a workshop, then retrained as a blacksmith. In 1918 he was either drafted into or volunteered for the Red Army. He fought in the Russian Civil War and took part in the defense of Yekaterinodar from units of the White Army. From 1919 he worked in the North Caucasus at the oil fields, and then in the railway transport. From 1922 to 1926, he worked with the Komsomol in Kuban. He became a member of the Communist party in 1925 and in the same year he was approved as the head of the agitprop department at a district party committee in the Azov-Black Sea region.

== Career ==
In 1927 he graduated from the Krasnodar Rabfak and in the same year entered the Moscow Institute of Transport Engineers. Since 1930 he has been an inspector for the acceptance of steam locomotives at the Michurinsky steam locomotive repair plant in Tambov. From 1931 to 1932, he continued his studies and in 1932, he graduated from the Moscow Electromechanical Institute of Railway Engineers, which was formed from MIIT in 1931. After graduation, he served as assistant to the director of the Moscow Institute of Transport Engineers.

From 1932 to 1937, he served in the Red Army as battalion commander in the Belarusian Military District, the Separate Red Banner Far Eastern Army, and the Moscow Military District. In 1936, he was appointed as an engineer at the Design Bureau of the All-Union Electrotechnical Institute, secretary of the party committee of the institute. On 1938, he served the apparatus of the Secretariat of the Communist Party of the Soviet Union.

=== As the head of Belarus ===
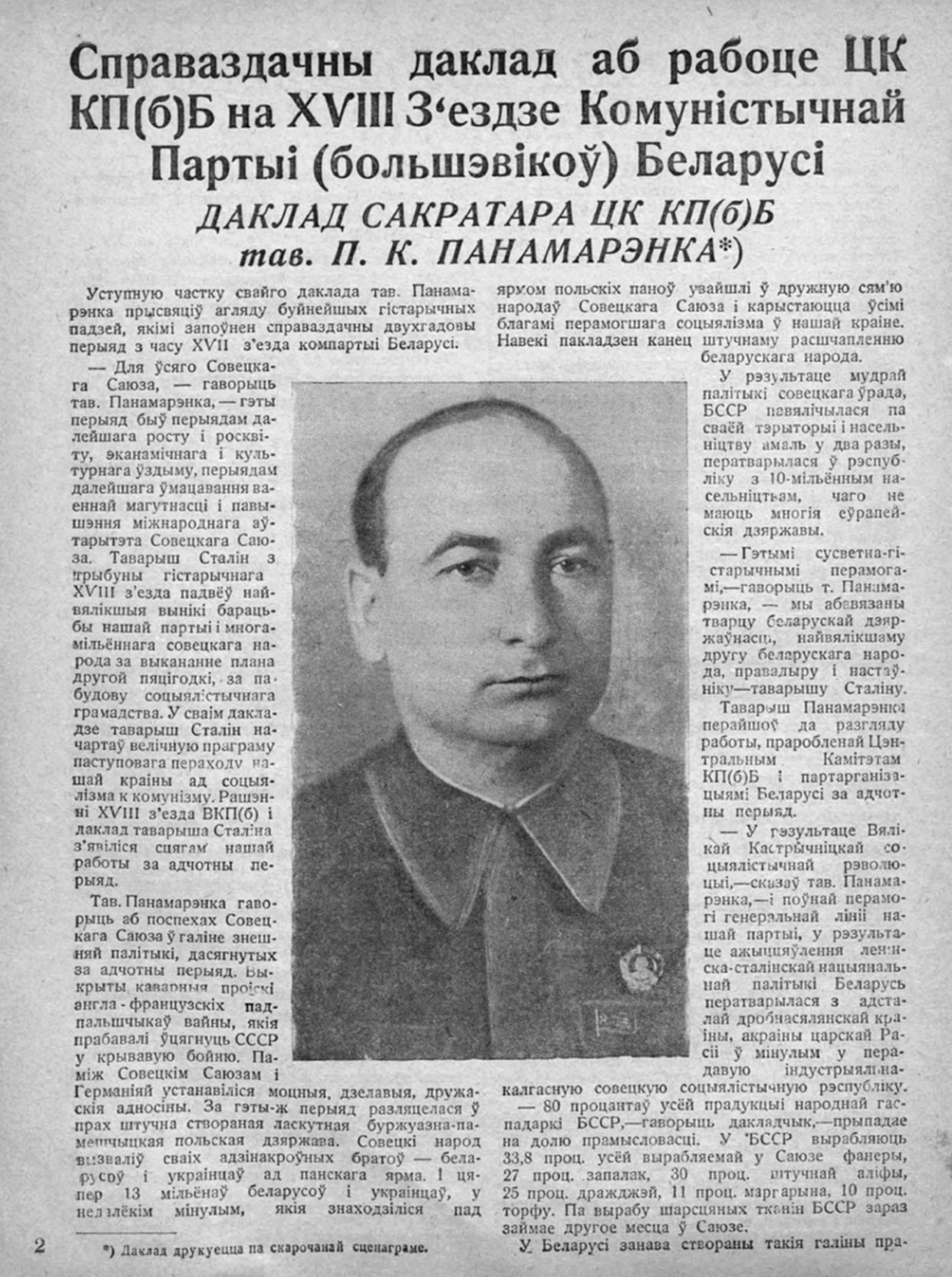
Ponomarenko in the Woman Worker and Woman Farmer of Belarus, May 1940

From 1938 to 1947, Ponomarenko was the First Secretary of the Communist Party of Belorussia, and from 1944 to 1948, also the Chairman of the Council of Ministers of Belarus. Ponomarenko devoted his first speech, which took place on 8 July 1938 in Gomel, to the task of 'rooting out enemies'. His cipher was also known to Stalin with a request to increase for the number of repressed in the first category (execution) by two thousand people, and in the second (prison or camp), by three thousand.

During the Great Purge he successfully defended Belarusian-language poets Yanka Kupala and Yakub Kolas from repressions, personally travelling to Stalin to appeal for their protection. The two poets were later awarded the Order of Lenin.

=== During World War II ===
Following the Invasion of Poland in 1939, Ponomarenko served as a member of the Military Council of the Belarusian Special Military District and took part in the leadership of the troops that entered the territory of Western Belarus.

During this time he also assisted the National Jazz Orchestra in Minsk, inviting Eddie Rosner to lead it.

Following the outbreak of Operation Barbarossa in 1941, he became a member of the Military Council of the Western Front. From July to May 1942, he served as a member of the Military Councils of Central Front, Bryansk Front and 3rd Shock Army of the Kalinin Front.

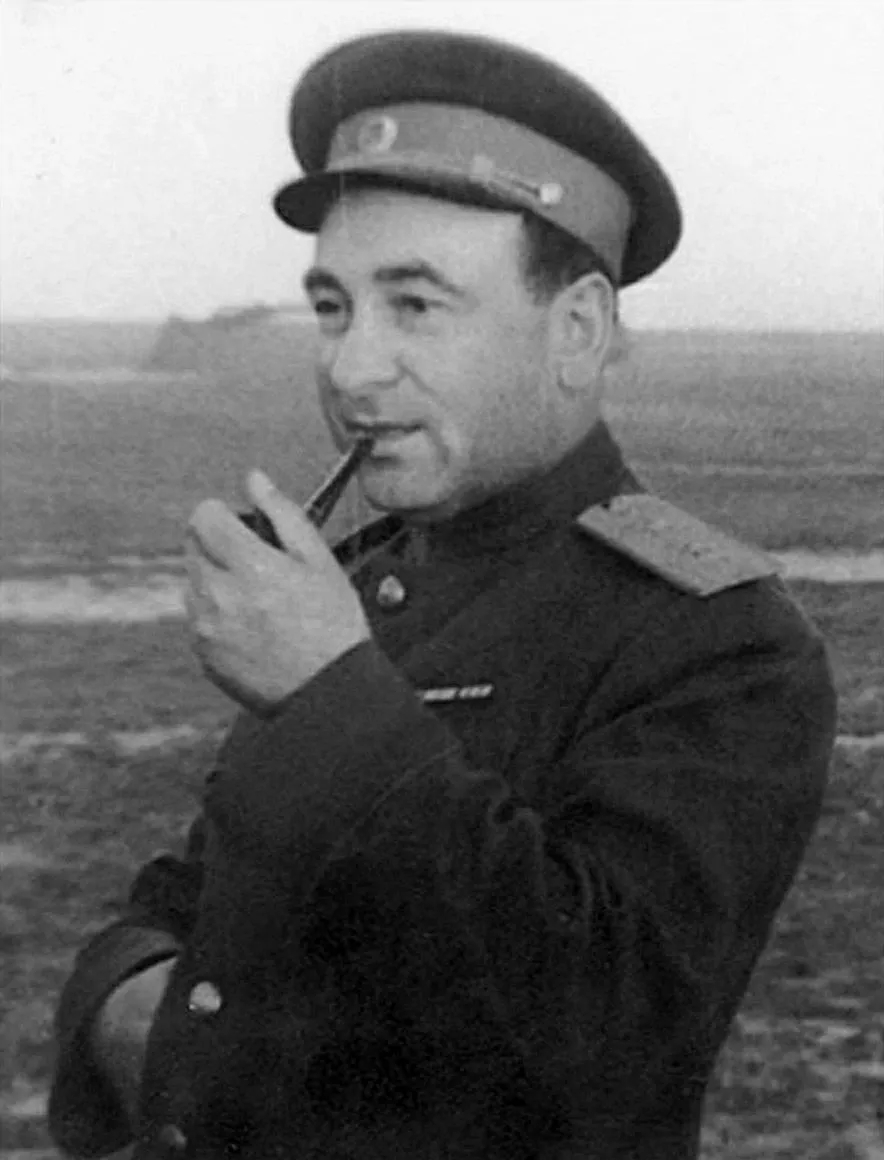
Ponomarenko during World War II

During World War II, he was one of the leaders of the Communist partisan units within Nazi-occupied Belarus. From May 1942 to March 1943, Ponomarenko served the Chief of Staff of the Central Headquarters of the Partisan Movement at the Headquarters of the Supreme Command. He was granted the rank of Lieutenant general in March 1943.

According to his information, the partisan units under his control in Belarus eliminated around 300,000 German soldiers, including 30 generals, 6,336 officers and 1,520 air force pilots, within two years of fighting. At the same time, 3,000 trains were derailed, 3,263 railway and road bridges, 1,191 tanks and armored vehicles, 618 command vehicles, 4,027 trucks, 476 aircraft, 378 heavy handguns, 895 ammunition and other storage facilities were destroyed. The concept of destroying the railway network by 90,000 partisans on 200,000 to 300,000 track sections was developed by Ponomarenko, who was familiar with the railways. He argued to Stalin that this destruction would severely restrict the freedom of movement of German troops.

According to the Polish Institute of National Remembrance, during that time he also clashed with the Polish underground and gave orders for his troops to disarm them and execute their officers. At the Plenum of the Central Committee on 27–28 February 1943, speaking of the goals of the Soviet partisans in Belarus, Ponomarenko stated that "the fight against the hostile Polish underground is inevitable".

In this aspect, the institute claims, the forces under Ponomarenko's command initiated a limited collaboration with the Nazi occupation forces informing on members of the Polish underground. On 22 June 1943, on his behalf, the Central Committee of the Communist Party of Belarus took the plenum in Moscow resolution on the undertakings to further develop the partisan movement in the western oblasts of Belarus, stating that

The western oblasts of Soviet Belarus are an integral part of the Republic of Belarus. The nationalist divisions and groups formed by Polish reactionary circles should be isolated from the population by creating Soviet troops and groups consisting of working people of Polish nationality. Nationalist units and groups should be fought by all means."

=== After the war ===
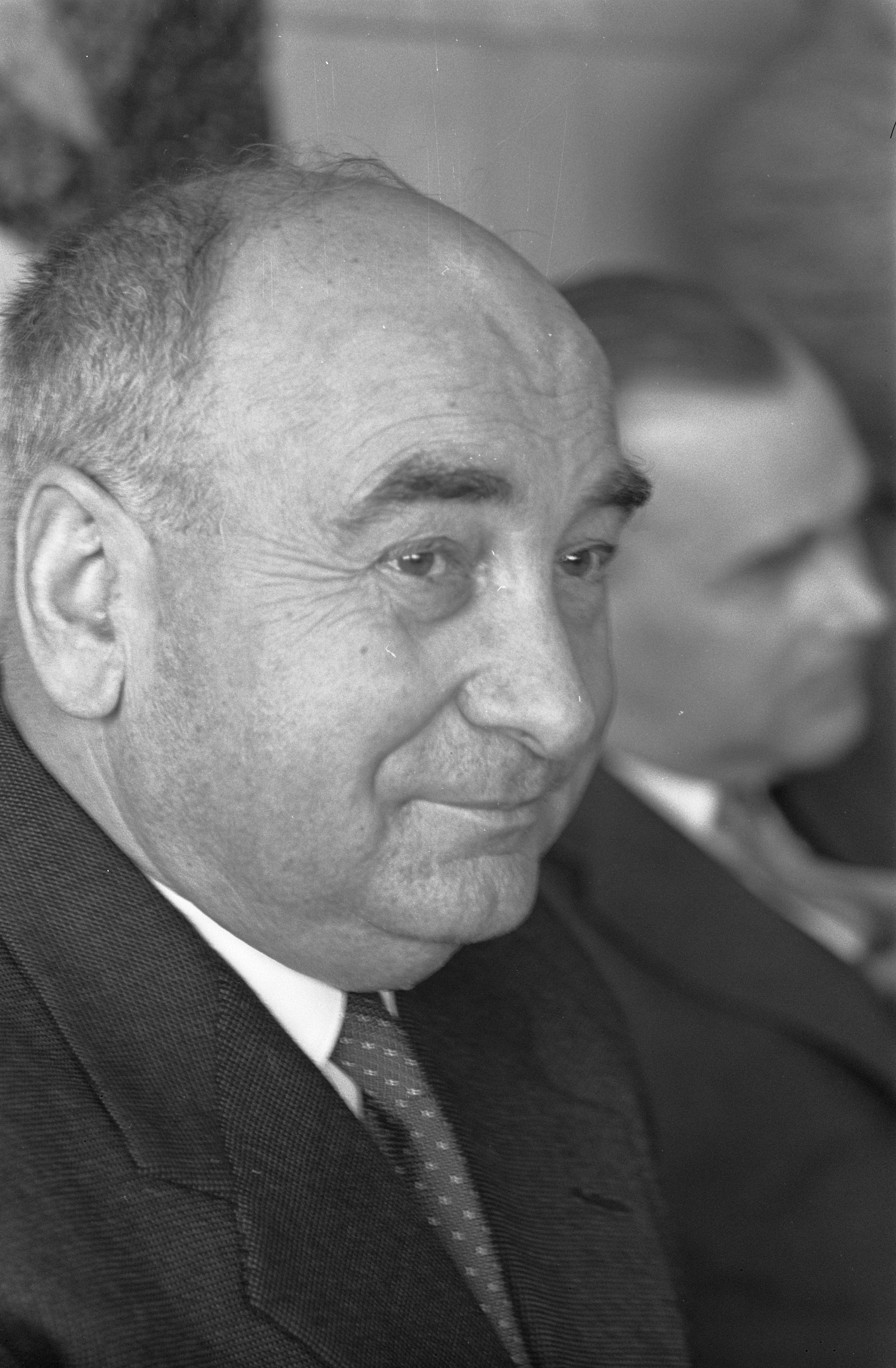
Ponomarenko in the Netherlands, 1959

From 1944 to 1948 he was a member of the Council of People's Commissars in the Belarusian SSR, which he chaired. In the Central Committee of the CPSU he worked as a secretary from 1948 to 1950, while at the same time he was a candidate for the Politburo of the CPSU from 1948 to 1952.

In 1946, the Soviet authorities ordered the central control of economic and financial activity of the Communist Party of Byelorussia. The audit revealed a number of abuses and mismanagement in the management of the party's treasury. The Party Control Committee of the Communist Party of the Soviet Union discovered that Ponomarenko was building a villa for himself using party money. He was also accused of a number of other abuses, including creating self-worship:

"Ponomarenko created an environment of flatterers around him, unable to bear the criticism he addressed. His portraits are often published in newspapers and magazines, various welcome letters are sent to his address, and he is elected to various honorary presidencies."

Faced with the accusations, Ponomarenko expressed self-criticism. Soon, however, he and his team were recalled. In the position of the First Secretary of the Central Committee of the CPB, he was replaced by Nikolai Gusarov. From 16 October 1952 until 6 March 1953, Ponomarenko was a member of the Politburo (called Presidium at the time) of the Communist Party of the Soviet Union.From 12 December 1952 to 15 March 1953, he served as Deputy Chairman of the Council of Ministers of the USSR for the procurement of agricultural products and agricultural raw materials. After the death of Joseph Stalin, he fell into temporary disgrace.

He was made First Secretary of the Communist Party of the Kazakh SSR in 1954 before becoming the Soviet ambassador to Poland between 1955 and 1957. During his time as ambassador to Poland, he was granted the keys to the Palace of Culture and Science in Warsaw by the Polish authorities.

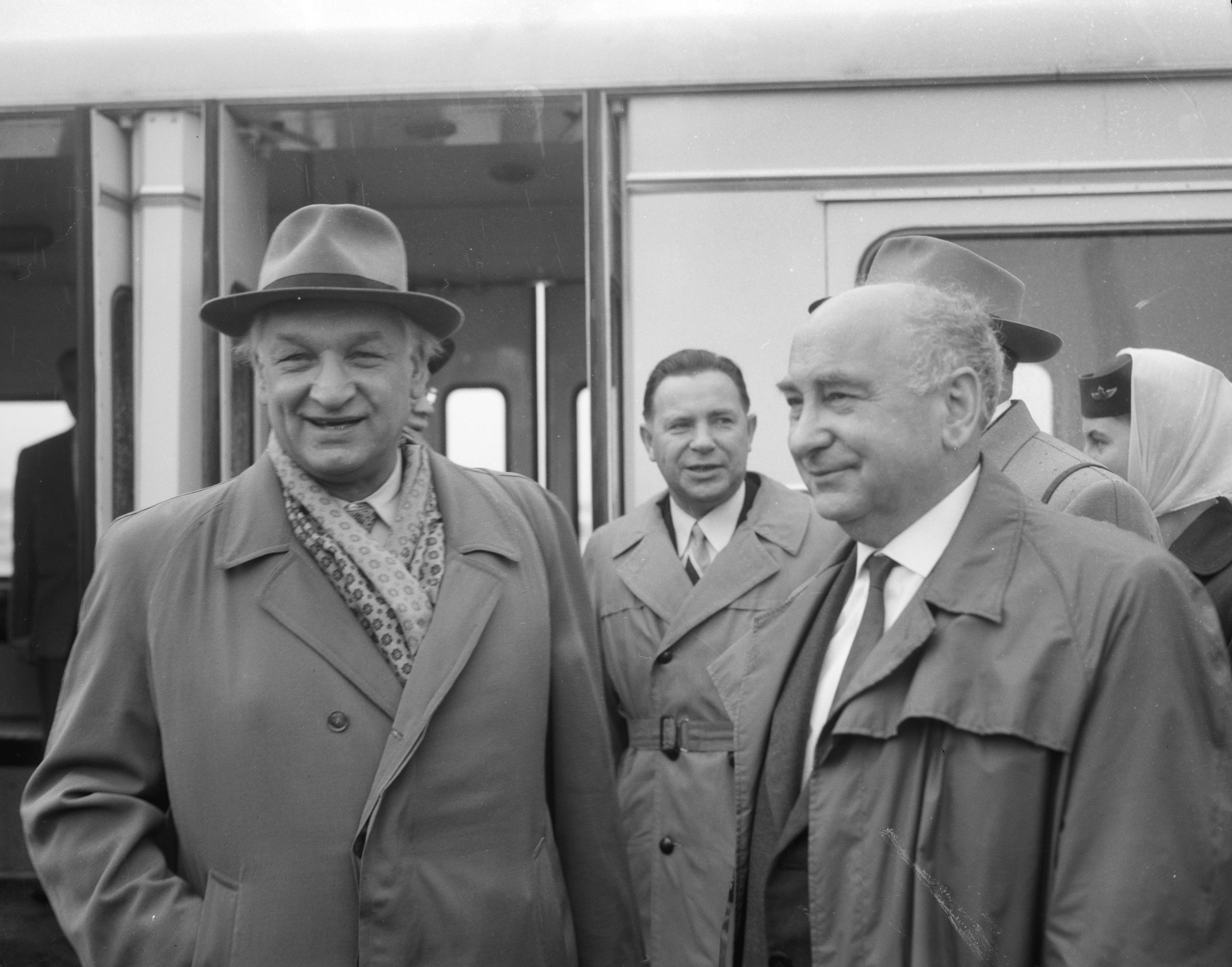
Ponomarenko (right) with Justas Paleckis at Schiphol Airport in Amsterdam, 1961

From 26 October 1957 to 22 April 1959 Ponomarenko was the Soviet ambassador to India and to Nepal, and from 30 June 1959 to 21 June 1962 to the Netherlands. During his time as ambassador to Netherlands, he was declared as persona non grata by the Dutch government. And in October 1961 Ponomarenko was recalled back to USSR, in connection with the following incident: Soviet scientist Alexei Golub and his wife worked at the Institute of Chemistry of the Academy of Sciences of the USSR in Sverdlovsk, and dealt with the effects of radioactivity on the human body. While visiting Netherlands, they decided to ask for political asylum. When Golub's wife was taken to the police station at the Amsterdam Schiphol Airport to ask if she also wanted to stay in the Netherlands, ten employees of the Soviet Embassy headed by Ponomarenko broke into the police station and forcibly took her to the Aeroflot office. At the same time, during a confrontation with a Dutch police officer, Ponomarenko received a blow to his nose. In the end, Golub's wife announced that she wanted to go back to the USSR, and six months later Alexey Golub himself returned to USSR.

From 1963 to 1967, Ponomorenko served as the Representative of USSR to the International Atomic Energy Agency in Vienna. In his later years, Ponomarenko was a professor at the Institute of Social Sciences under the Central Committee of the CPSU between 1964 and 1974. From 1978, he was a personal pensioner of federal significance.

Ponomorenko died on 18 January 1984. He is buried at the Novodevichy cemetery in Moscow.

== Honours and awards ==
Four Orders of Lenin
Order of the October Revolution
Order of Suvorov, 1st class
Order of the Patriotic War, 1st class
Order of the Badge of Honour
Medal "To a Partisan of the Patriotic War", 1st class
Medal "For the Defence of Moscow"
Medal "For the Victory over Germany in the Great Patriotic War 1941–1945"
Medal "For Valiant Labour in the Great Patriotic War 1941–1945"
Cross of Grunwald, 1st class (Poland)

Streets in Minsk and Mogilev, and a factory in Gomel, in Belarus are named after Ponomarenko. In 2012, the National Archives of the Republic of Belarus hosted an exhibition dedicated to the 110th anniversary of the birth of Ponomarenko.

== Trivia ==
- The Belgian artist Henri Van Herwege probably took inspiration from the name Ponomarenko for his moniker, Panamarenko. He first encountered this name through the radio, hence the spelling that is more phonetic in his native Dutch.

== Works ==
- Освобождение Белоруссии [Liberation of Belarus] (in Belarusian). Minsk: State Publishing House of the BSSR. 1944.
