= Belarus–Turkey relations =

- Belarus: Turkey

Diplomatic mission
- Belarusian Embassy, Ankara: Turkish Embassy, Minsk

Envoy
- Ambassador Anatoly Glaz: Ambassador Güçlü Cem Işık

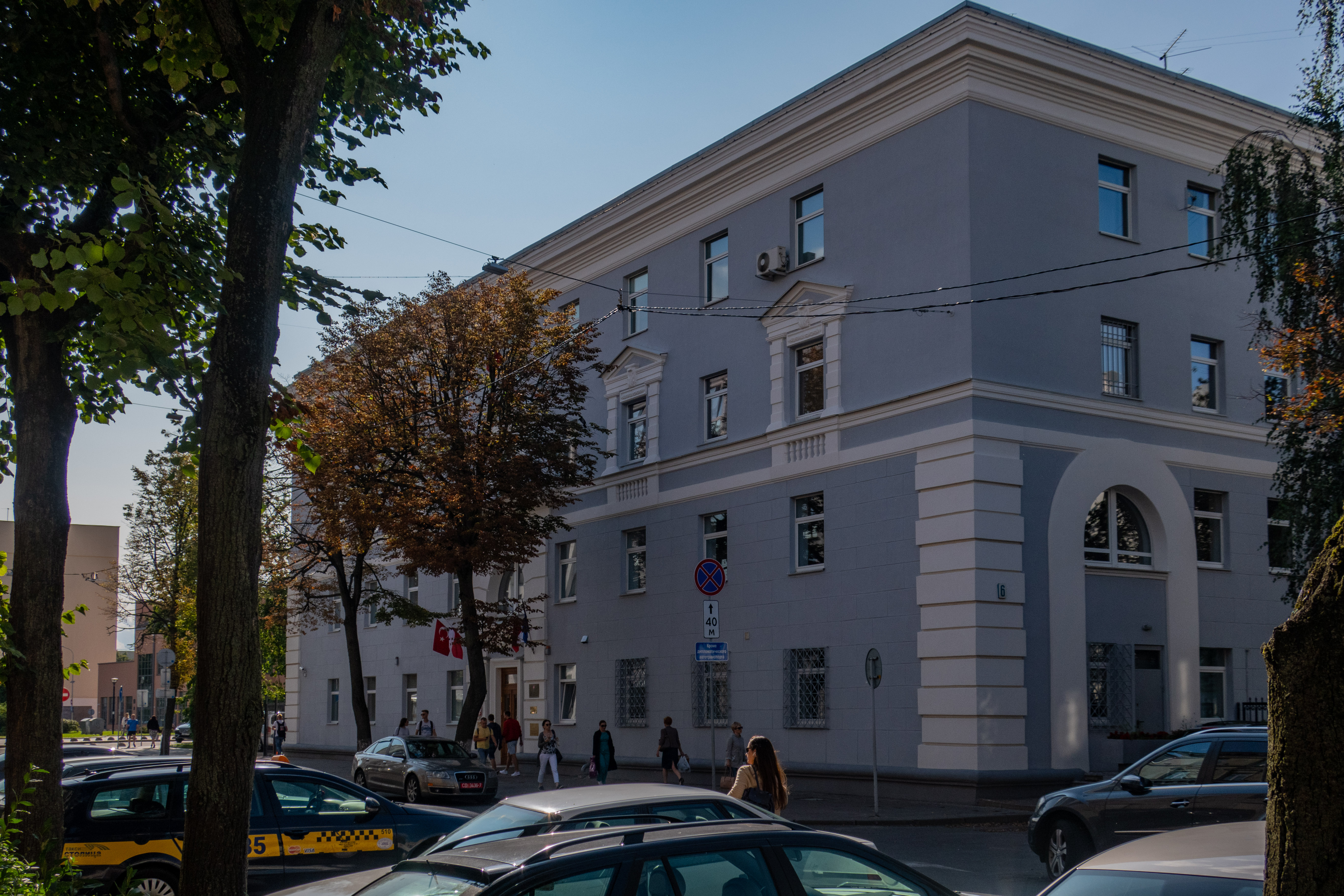
Embassy of Turkey in Minsk

Turkey was the first country to recognize the independence of Belarus. Diplomatic relations were established on 25 March 1992. Turkey has an embassy in Minsk. Belarus has an embassy in Ankara, a consulate general in Istanbul.

== High level visits ==
Guest	Host	Place of visit	Date of visit
(Turkey) President Recep Tayyip Erdoğan	(Belarus) President Alexander Lukashenko	Independence Palace, Minsk	November 11, 2016
(Belarus) President Alexander Lukashenko	(Turkey) President Recep Tayyip Erdoğan	Presidential Complex, Ankara	April 16, 2019
(Turkey) Minister of Foreign Affairs Mevlüt Çavuşoğlu	(Belarus) Minister of Foreign Affairs Vladimir Makei	Independence Palace, Minsk	August 27-28, 2019

== Economic relations ==
Trade volume between the two countries was US$691 million in 2019 (Turkish exports/imports: US$531/160 million).

== See also ==
- Foreign relations of Belarus
- Foreign relations of Turkey
