= Embassy of Belarus, Vienna =

Embassy of the Republic of Belarus, Vienna Belarusian: Пасольства Рэспублікі Беларусь у Вена German: Botschaft der Republik Belarus in Wien
- Location: Hüttelbergstrasse 6 Vienna, Austria
- Coordinates: 48.2031387°N 16.2554611°E
- Opened: 1993 (moved to current building in 1996)
- Ambassador: Andrei Dapkiunas

The Embassy of Belarus in Vienna (German: Botschaft der Republik Belarus in der Republik Österreich, Belarusian: Пасольства Рэспублікі Беларусь у Аўстрыйскай Рэспубліцы) is the diplomatic mission of Belarus to Austria. The current Belarusian ambassador to Austria is Andrei Dapkiunas.

== History ==
The current neobaroque building which houses the embassy is known as Villa Bisteghi. It was built in 1909 by the architect Carl Peter Brizzi for the banker Rudolf Bisteghi (1844-1933) on the site of an older and smaller house belonging to the Bisteghi family.

The house was captured by Soviet troops after the occupation of Vienna in 1945 and later handed over to the French occupation authorities.

In 1996, the villa was acquired by the Republic of Belarus and the Belarusian embassy, established in 1993, moved there.

The embassy also hosts the permanent mission of Belarus to Vienna-based international organizations:

- United Nations Office at Vienna / United National Office on Drugs and Crime
- United Nations Industrial Development Organization (UNIDO)
- International Atomic Energy Agency (IAEA)
- Comprehensive Nuclear-Test-Ban Treaty Organization
- United Nations Scientific Committee on the Effects of Atomic Radiation

It also hosts the Permanent Delegation of the Republic of Belarus to the:

- Organization for Security and Co-operation in Europe (OSCE)
- Joint Consultative Group of the Treaty on Conventional Armed Forces in Europe (JCG)
- Open Skies Consultative Commission (OSCC).

== Ambassadors ==
- Valiantsin Fisienka (1994 – 2000)
- Viktar Haisionak (Viktar Gaisenak, 2000 – 2005)
- Aliaksandr Sychou (2005 – 2011)
- Valery Varanetski (2011 – 2016)
- Alena Kupchyna (2016 - 2020)
- Andrei Dapkiunas (since 2020)

== Links ==
- Official website
