= Nikolai Patolichev =

Soviet bureaucrat (1908–1989)

- Николай Патоличев
- Patolichev in 1974

Minister of Foreign Trade
- In office 26 August 1958 – 18 October 1985
- Premier: Nikita Khrushchev; Alexei Kosygin; Nikolai Tikhonov; Nikolai Ryzhkov
- Preceded by: Ivan Kabanov (politician)
- Succeeded by: Boris Aristov

First Secretary of the Communist Party of Byelorussia
- In office 31 May 1950 – 28 July 1956
- Head of state: Vasily Kozlov
- Head of government: Aleksey Kleshchev; Kirill Mazurov
- Preceded by: Nikolai Gusarov
- Succeeded by: Kirill Mazurov

Candidate member of the 19th Presidium
- In office 16 October 1952 – 6 March 1953

Member of the 18th Secretariat
- In office 6 May 1946 – 24 May 1947

Member of the 18th Orgburo
- In office 18 March 1946 – 24 May 1947

Personal details
- Born: 23 September 1908 Zolino, Russian Empire
- Died: 1 December 1989 (aged 81) Moscow, Russian SFSR, Soviet Union
- Party: Communist Party of the Soviet Union
- Profession: Civil servant
- Awards: Hero of Socialist Labour, Order of Lenin, (11); Order of the Red Banner of Labour

Nikolai Semyonovich Patolichev (Russian: Никола́й Семёнович Пато́личев; 23 September 1908 – 1 December 1989) was a Soviet bureaucrat who served as Minister of Foreign Trade of the Soviet Union from 1958 to 1985. Prior to that, he was the First Secretary of the Central Committee of the Communist Party of Byelorussia from 1950 to 1956.

== Biography ==
=== Early life ===
Nikolai Semyonovich Patolichev was born in 1908 in Zolino in Vladimir Governorate (now Nizhny Novgorod Oblast) in a peasant family of Russian ethnicity, the son of a Red Army hero in the Russian Civil War, and was orphaned at the age of twelve. After working in factories, he became a Komsomol activist. From an early age, Joseph Stalin had taken an interest in Patolichev. Nikolai's father, Semyon Patolichev, had been a good friend of Stalin's before he was killed in the Polish-Soviet War in 1920. Nikolai Patolichev joined the Communist Party in 1928 in the city of Dzerzhinsk as a Komsomol.

=== Preparations for war economy ===
Patolichev first arrived in Yaroslavl in August 1938, as a "special representative of the Central Committee of the CPSU (Communist Party of the Soviet Union)," and was tasked with "strengthening defense-related production of synthetic rubber at the largest industrial plant in the Soviet Union, located in the city of Yaroslavl." Patolichev was promoted to first secretary of the Yaroslavl Oblast Party Committee in January 1939.

The following March, at the 18th Party Congress, he was elected a candidate member of the Central Committee of the CPSU. In February 1941, at the 18th All-Union Conference of the Communist Party of the Soviet Union, Patolichev was promoted to full membership on the Central Committee. On 28 December 1941, Patolichev was relieved from duties in Yaroslavl and transferred to Chelyabinsk.

Chelyabinsk, known as Tankograd during the Great Patriotic War, was a major industrial center that contributed greatly to the Soviet war effort against Nazi Germany. Patolichev served as First Secretary of the Chelyabinsk Oblast and City Party Committees from 4 January 1942 to 21 March 1946, and took a hands-on approach with industrial war production, even intervening when factories missed their production targets.

=== A busy year in Moscow ===
In February 1946 Patolichev was recalled to Moscow to head the Organization and Instruction Department of the Central Committee, and was elected to the Orgburo on 18 March 1946. His role was expanded on 6 May 1946, when he was made a secretary of the Central Committee, taking the place of Georgy Malenkov, who was temporarily demoted. In August, Patolichev became chief of the reorganized Organizational-Instructional department, now called the Directorate for the Checking of Party Organs.

In the fall of 1946, he became first deputy chairman of the Council for Collective Farm Affairs under his mentor, chairman Andrey Andreyevich Andreyev. His responsibilities in Moscow now included the incongruously combined affairs of agriculture and cadres, which led him to his next assignment in Ukraine.

On 3 March 1947, Patolichev and Lazar Kaganovich were sent by Stalin to Ukraine to "help" Nikita Khrushchev, who had fallen into disfavor. Kaganovich took over Khrushchev's post of First Secretary, with Patolichev becoming Central Committee secretary for agriculture and procurement, de facto Second Secretary. The two did not work well together, and Patolichev requested that Stalin reassign him. He was removed from his posts on the Orgburo and Secretariat on 24 May 1947; his post in the latter body was taken by Mikhail Suslov.

Patolichev next became first secretary of the Rostov Oblast and City Party Committees, serving from August 1947 to June 1950.

=== Byelorussian period ===
According to historian Evan Mawdsley, Patolichev "...recovered from this 'exile' in 1950, with another surprise appointment. In one of the intervals of a Supreme Soviet meeting Stalin called him in and asked him if he wanted to be first secretary of the Byelorussian SSR; Patolichev agreed ('Gotov, tovarishch Stalin – otvetil ia'). In the late Stalin years it was not unusual to appoint ethnic Russians to leading posts in the non-Russian republics; Patolichev's task was to raise local agricultural production." Patolichev succeeded Nikolai Gusarov as First Secretary of the Central Committee of the Communist Party of Byelorussia on 31 May 1950. In October 1952, Patolichev delivered one of the main speeches at the 19th Party Congress and was re-elected to the Central Committee as a full member.

At the Central Committee plenum that followed the 19th Congress, he was also elected candidate member of the enlarged Presidium of the Central Committee, which replaced the old Politburo. On 5 March 1953, Patolichev was removed from the Central Committee Presidium in the reorganization that followed Stalin's death. At Lavrenty Beria's instigation, in June 1953 the Presidium attempted to remove Patolichev as first secretary in Byelorussia and replace him with an ethnic Belarusian, Mikhail Zimyanin.

At the contentious plenum of the Byelorussian Central Committee that followed, the delegates rallied behind Patolichev and rejected the Presidium's decree, which was later dropped. During the discussion of his dismissal at the plenum, Patolichev made an impassioned speech before the assembled delegates:

"I came to Byelorussia by the will of the party, and I am leaving by the will of the party. For the past three years I have spared no effort and have worked as a Communist should. So will I remain to the end of my life, so will I act wherever our great Communist Party sends me."

— Patolichev, Plenum of the Byelorussian Central Committee, June 1953

Patolichev managed to fend off Beria's attempt to remove him, but at the January 1955 Central Committee plenum in Moscow he clashed with Khrushchev over agricultural policy. He was later replaced as first secretary in Byelorussia by ethnic Belarusian Kirill Mazurov, and in July 1956 became first deputy minister of Foreign Affairs.

=== Khrushchev period ===
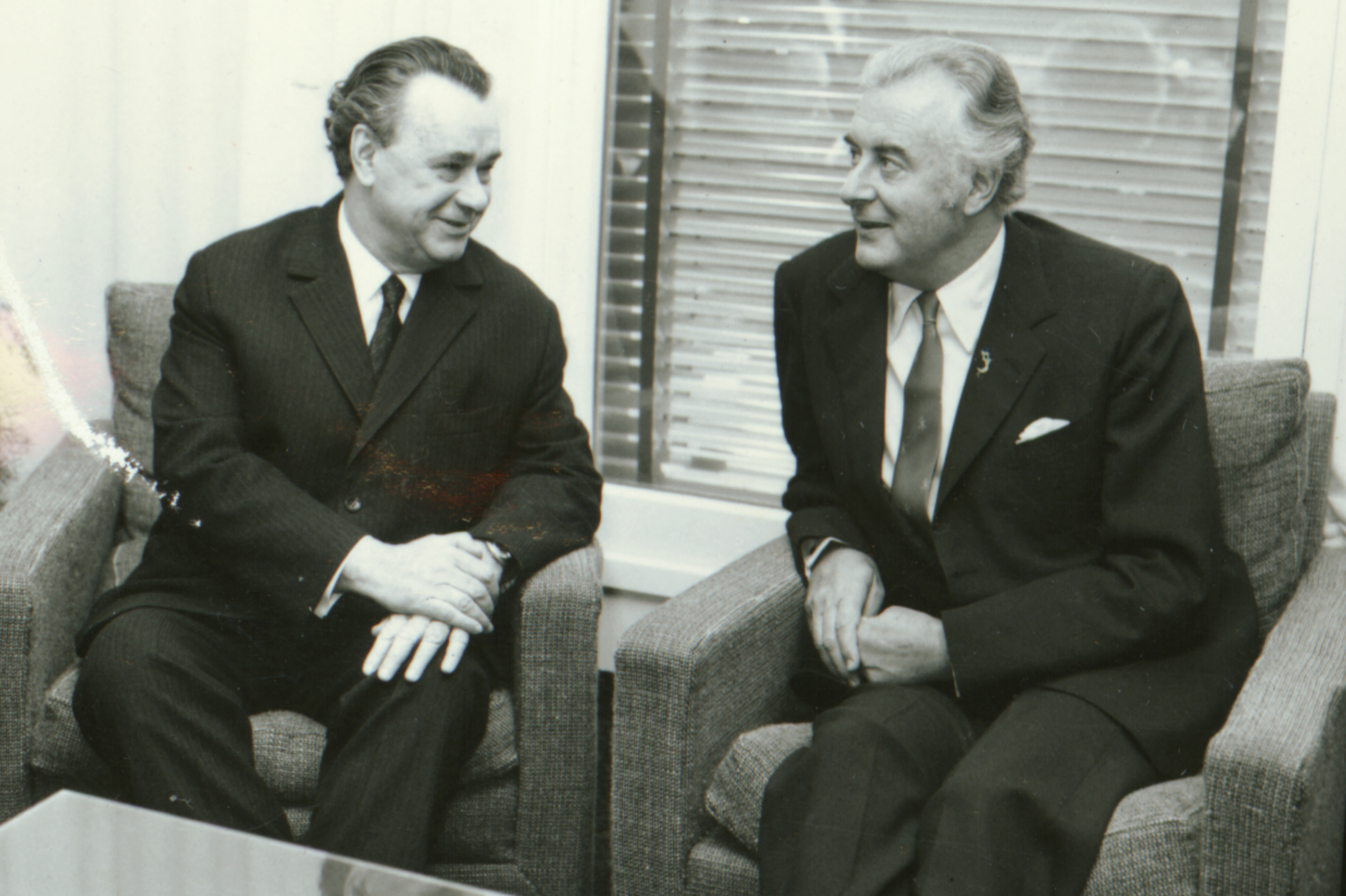
Patolichev with Australian prime minister Gough Whitlam in 1973

In 1956 Patolichev was reassigned from Byelorussia once more to Moscow, this time as First Deputy Minister of Foreign Affairs. He served in that position from 1956 to 1958, when he was elevated to the honorable post of Minister of Foreign Trade of the USSR. Though he had a seat on the Council of Ministers of the USSR, Patolichev never returned to the Politburo and thus his influence was less than that of his contemporaries Mikhail Suslov and Yuri Andropov. Patolichev served as Minister of Foreign Trade for twenty-seven years, until Mikhail Gorbachev replaced him.

=== Death and legacy ===
Nikolai Patolichev died in Moscow on 1 December 1989. He was 81 years old at the time of his death.

Patolichev is one of two people to have received 11 Order of Lenin decorations. He was also a recipient of the Hero of Socialist Labour (1975, 1978), the Order of the October Revolution (1983), the Order of the Red Banner of Labour (1943), and Honorary citizen of Chelyabinsk (1978).

== Works ==
- "USSR Foreign Trade: Past, Present and Future." Moscow: Novosti Press Agency (1967).
- "USSR Foreign Trade: Yesterday, Today & Tomorrow." Moscow: Novosti Press Agency (1971).
- Measures of Maturity, My Early Life. Oxford: Pergamon Press (1983). ISBN 978-0080245454.
