= Ivan Antanovich =

Belarusian sociologist, philosopher, diplomat and politician

Ivan Antonovich

Minister of Foreign Affairs
- In office 13 January 1997 – 4 December 1998
- President: Alexander Lukashenko
- Prime Minister: Sergey Ling
- Preceded by: Uladzimir Syanko
- Succeeded by: Ural Latypov

Personal details
- Born: 3 April 1937 (age 89) Damašy, Nowogródek Voivodeship, Second Polish Republic
- Party: Communist Party of the Soviet Union; Communist Party of Byelorussia
- Education: Kazan Federal University

Ivan Ivanavich Antanovich (Belarusian: Іва́н Іва́навіч Антано́віч, Russian: Ива́н Ива́нович Антоно́вич born 3 April 1937) is a Belarusian sociologist, linguist, political scientist, philosopher, diplomat, and politician. He was a professor of sociology in 1973 and a doctorate for Doktor nauk in 1977. He is a founder of the Republican Party of Labour and Justice. He was the Minister of Foreign Affairs for Belarus from 1997 to 1998. He speaks fluent Belarusian, Russian and English.

== Personal life ==
He was born in the village of Damašy in the Second Polish Republic in 1937. He graduated from the Kazan Federal University in Russia. In 1969, he was working at the Secretariat in the United Nations in the UNESCO. In 1977, he was a head secretary of Minsk City CPB and later was the head of Culture and Department of Communist Party of Byelorussia. From 1990 to 1991 - Deputy Head of the Department of the Central Committee of links with social and political organizations. From 1990 to 1991 he was the member of the Political Bureau of the Communist Party of the RSFSR. From 1990 to 1991, he was the Secretary of the Communist Party of the RSFSR Relations socio-political organizations. From 1991 to 1993 he worked in the international non-governmental research and educational organization "Rau-Corporation." He served as the Deputy Minister of Foreign Affairs of the Republic of Belarus from 1996 to 1997. He is married and has two children.

Political offices
Preceded by Uladzimir Syanko	Minister of Foreign Affairs; 1997-1998	Succeeded by Ural Latypov
