= Aleksey Kleshchev =

Soviet Belarusian military commander and politician (1905–1968)

Aleksey Yefimovich Kleshchev
- Алексе́й Ефи́мович Клещёв

Chairman of the Council of Ministers of the Byelorussian SSR (Head of government of the Byelorussian SSR)
- In office 17 March 1948 – 25 June 1953
- Leader: Nikolai Gusarov; Nikolai Patolichev
- Head of state: Vasily Kozlov
- Preceded by: Panteleimon Ponomarenko
- Succeeded by: Kirill Mazurov

Personal details
- Born: 25 February 1905 Mikhnovichi, Minsk Governorate, Russian Empire
- Died: 13 December 1968 (aged 63) Moscow, Soviet Union
- Resting place: Novodevichy Cemetery
- Party: Communist Party of the Soviet Union (1928–1961)

Military service
- Allegiance: Soviet Union
- Branch/service: Red Army
- Years of service: 1927–1929; 1941–1944
- Rank: Major general
- Commands: Pinsk Partisan Unit
- Battles/wars: World War II
- Awards: Hero of the Soviet Union; Order of Lenin (3); Order of the Red Banner; Order of the Patriotic War, 1st class

Aleksey Yefimovich Kleshchev (Russian: Алексе́й Ефи́мович Клещёв, 25 February 1905 – 13 December 1968) was a Belarusian general and politician. He served as the Chairman of the Council of Ministers of the Byelorussian Soviet Socialist Republic from 17 March 1948 to 24 July 1953. Kleschchov led partisans in Pinsk as a major general during World War II, for which he was awarded the title Hero of the Soviet Union. He was a member of the Communist Party of Kazakhstan from 1955 until 1960. He was deputy member of the Supreme Soviet of the Soviet Union. From 1927 to 1929, he served in the Red Army. He was born in Minsk Governorate and died in Moscow on 13 December 1968, aged 63. He was decorated as the Order of the Red Banner.

== Early life and career ==
Kleshchev was born on 25 February 1905 in the village of Mikhnovichi in Minsk Governorate (now in Kalinkavichy District of Belarus' Gomel Region) to a peasant family of Belarusian ethnicity. He graduated from primary school in his native village in 1917, and from two grades of the Kalinkavichy Railway School. In 1924 he became secretary of the Beseda rural council (selsoviet) in Kopatkevichy District, and two years later was its chairman. Between 1927 and 1929, Kleshchev served in the Red Army's 16th Corps Artillery Regiment, part of the Belorussian Military District at Mogilev. He became a member of the Communist Party of the Soviet Union in 1928. Between 1930 and 1939, he was the director of the Shklov, Drissa, and Mekhov Machine and tractor stations. In September 1939, Kleshchev became chief of the land department of Pinsk Oblast.

== World War II ==
From July 1941, Kleshchev was a member of the Pinsk Oblast Underground Party Center, creating underground party organizations and organizing partisans against the German occupation forces. He also served with the Turov and Stolin partisan detachments. In December, he crossed the front line and went to Moscow, where he was a member of the Special Group of the Central Committee of the Communist Party from February to June 1942. In June, he was sent back across the front lines to Pinsk, where Kleshchev became a member of the Pinsk Oblast Party Committee.

In September, he became the commissioner of the Communist Party in the Pinsk Oblast, and from 1943 Kleshchev was secretary of the Pinsk Oblast Underground Party Committee. Between 27 April and 10 October, he commanded the Pinsk Partisan Unit, which attacked installations of the German occupation troops, disrupted lines of communications, and destroyed equipment. On 16 September of that year, he was given the military rank of Major General as one of ten Belarusian partisan leaders. Kleshchev was awarded the title Hero of the Soviet Union and the Order of Lenin on 1 January 1944 for his leadership of the partisans.

== Later career ==
In 1944, Kleshchev became first secretary of the Pinsk Oblast Committee of the Communist Party. Between 1946 and 1948, he served in the same position for Polotsk Oblast. From 1948 to 1953, Kleshchev was Chairman of the Council of Ministers of the Byelorussian SSR. For the next two years, he studied at the courses of the CPSU Central Committee, then was first secretary of the Kokshetau Oblast Party Committee in Kazakhstan until 1960. Kleshchev retired in 1961 and lived in Moscow, where he died on 13 December 1968. He was buried in the Novodevichy Cemetery.

== Awards ==
Kleshchev received the following awards:

- Hero of the Soviet Union
- Order of Lenin (3)
- Order of the Red Banner
- Order of the Patriotic War
