= List of prime ministers of Belarus =

This is a list of prime ministers of Belarus since the Belarusian declaration of independence in 1918.

== Belarusian People's Republic (1918–1920) ==
=== Chairmen of the People's Secretariat ===
Portrait	Name (birth–death)	Term of office		Political party
1	Jazep Jakaulevich Varonka (1891–1952)	21 February 1918	May 1918	Belarusian Socialist Assembly
2	Jan Nikitivich Sierada (1879–1943+)	June 1918	August 1918	Belarusian Socialist Assembly
3	Raman Aliaksandravich Skirmunt (1868–1939)	June 1918	August 1918	Belarusian National Assembly
4	Anton Ivanavich Luckievich (1883–1938)	October 1918	11 October 1918	Belarusian Socialist Assembly

=== Chairmen of the Council of Ministers ===
Portrait	Name (birth–death)	Term of office		Political party
4	Anton Ivanavich Luckievich (1883–1938)	11 October 1918	13 December 1919	Belarusian Socialist Assembly
5	Vaclau Justynavich Lastouski (1883–1938)	13 December 1919	1920	Belarusian Socialist-Revolutionary Party

== Rada of the Belarusian Democratic Republic (since 1920) ==
=== Chairmen of the Council of Ministers ===
Following the fall of the Belarusian People's Republic, the Rada went into exile—first to Vilnius to 1925, then to Prague before settling in Canada.

Portrait	Name (birth–death)	Term of office		Political party
1	Vaclau Justynavich Lastouski (1883–1938)	1920	23 August 1923	Socialist-Revolutionary Party
2	Aliaksandar (Ivanavič) Cvikievič (1888–1937)	23 August 1923	8 March 1928	Socialist-Revolutionary Party
3	Vasil Ivanovich Zacharka (1877–1943)	8 March 1928	6 March 1943	Belarusian Socialist Assembly
4	Mikola Semyonovich Abramchyk (1903–1970)	6 March 1943	May 1970	Independent
5	Vincent Žuk-Hryškievič (1903–1989)	May 1970	November 1980	Independent
6	Jazep Sažyč (1917–2007)	November 1980	1997	Independent
7	Ivonka Survilla (born 1936)	30 August 1997		Independent

== Byelorussian Soviet Socialist Republic (1920–1991) ==
=== Chairmen of the Council of People's Commissars ===
Portrait	Name (birth–death)	Term of office		Political party
6	Alexander Grigoryevich Chervyakov (1892–1937)	1 August 1920	17 March 1924	Communist Party
7	Iosif Alexandrovich Adamovich (1897–1937)	17 March 1924	7 May 1927	Communist Party
8	Nikolay Mateyevich Goloded (1894–1937)	7 May 1927	30 May 1937	Communist Party
9	Danil Ivanavich Volkovich (1900–1937)	30 May 1937	8 September 1937	Communist Party
10	Afanasy Feodorovich Kovalyov (1903–1993)	8 September 1937	28 July 1938	Communist Party
11	Kuzma Venediktovich Kiselyov (1903–1977)	28 July 1938	28 June 1940	Communist Party
12	Ivan Semyonovich Bylinsky (1903–1976)	28 June 1940	7 February 1944	Communist Party
13	Panteleimon Kondratyevich Ponomarenko (1902–1984)	7 February 1944	15 March 1946	Communist Party

=== Chairman of the Council of Ministers ===
Portrait	Name (birth–death)	Term of office		Political party
(13)	Panteleimon Kondratyevich Ponomarenko (1902–1984)	15 March 1946	17 March 1948	Communist Party
14	Aleksey Yefimovich Kleshchev (1905–1968)	15 March 1948	25 June 1953	Communist Party
15	Kirill Trofimovich Mazurov (1914–1989)	25 June 1953	28 July 1956	Communist Party
16	Nikolai Efremovich Avkhimovich (1907–1996)	28 July 1956	9 April 1959	Communist Party
17	Tikhon Yakovlevich Kiselyov (1917–1983)	9 April 1959	11 December 1978	Communist Party
18	Aleksandr Nikiforovich Aksyonov (1924–2009)	11 December 1978	8 July 1983	Communist Party
19	Vladimir Ignatevich Brovikov (1931–1992)	8 July 1983	10 January 1986	Communist Party
20	Mikhail Vasilevich Kovalyov (1925–2007)	10 January 1986	7 April 1990	Communist Party
21	Vyacheslav Frantsevich Kebich (1936–2020)	7 April 1990	19 September 1991	Communist Party

== Republic of Belarus (since 1991) ==
=== Prime ministers ===
Portrait	Name (birth–death)	Term of office		Political party
(21)	Vyacheslav Frantsevich Kebich (1936–2020)	19 September 1991	21 July 1994	Independent
22	Mikhail Nikolayevich Chigir (born 1948)	21 July 1994	18 November 1996	Independent
23	Sergei Stepanovich Ling (born 1937)	18 November 1996	18 February 2000	Independent
25	Vladimir Vasilyevich Yermoshin (born 1942)	18 February 2000	1 October 2001	Independent
26	Gennady Vasilyevich Novitsky (born 1949)	1 October 2001	11 July 2004	Independent
27	Sergei Sergeyevich Sidorsky (born 1954)	11 July 2004	28 December 2010	Independent
28	Mikhail Vladimirovich Myasnikovich (born 1950)	28 December 2010	27 December 2014	Independent
29	Andrei Vladimirovich Kobyakov (born 1960)	27 December 2014	18 August 2018	Independent
30	Sergei Nikolayevich Rumas (born 1969)	18 August 2018	3 June 2020	Independent
31	Roman Alexanderovich Golovchenko (born 1973)	4 June 2020	10 March 2025	Independent
32	Aleksandr Genrikhovich Turchin (born 1975)	10 March 2025	Incumbent	Independent

== See also ==
- Lists of political office-holders in Belarus
- President of Belarus
