= Ural Latypov =

Belarusian jurist, diplomat and politician

Minister of Foreign Affairs
- In office 4 December 1998 – 27 November 2000
- President: Alexander Lukashenko
- Prime Minister: Sergei Ling; Vladimir Yermoshin
- Preceded by: Ivan Ivanovich Antonovich
- Succeeded by: Mikhail Khvostov

Head of the Presidential Administration of Belarus
- In office 12 September 2001 – 29 November 2004
- President: Alexander Lukashenko

Personal details
- Born: 28 February 1951 (age 75) Bakalinsky District, Bashkir Autonomous Soviet Socialist Republic, Russian Soviet Federative Socialist Republic, Soviet Union

Ural Ramdrakovich Latypov (Russian: Ура́л Рамдракович Латы́пов, romanized: Ural Ramdrakovič Latypov, Belarusian: Урал Рамдракавіч Латыпаў, romanized: Ural Ramdrakavič Latypaw, Tatar: Урал Рамдрак улы Латыйпов, romanized: Ural Ramdraq ulı Latıypov, born 28 February 1951) is a Belarusian jurist, diplomat and politician.

== Biography ==
Latypov was born in 1951 into an ethnic Tatar family in the Bashkir Autonomous Soviet Socialist Republic. In 1973 he graduated from Kazan University in Tatarstan and subsequently held different positions at the KGB.

In 1989 Latypov was transferred to the Higher School of the KGB in Minsk. He kept working at the school after the dissolution of the USSR in 1991 and after its transformation into the National Security Academy of the Republic of Belarus.

In 1994 he was appointed aide to the newly elected president Alexander Lukashenko. Until 1998, he held various positions at the Presidential Administration of Belarus.

From 4 December 1998 to 27 November 2000, Latypov was the Minister of Foreign Affairs of Belarus under President Alexander Lukashenko and Prime Minister Vladimir Yermoshin.

Between 2000 and 2001 he served as state secretary of the Security Council of Belarus. Between 2001 and 2004, Latypov was head of the Presidential Administration of Belarus.

== Awards ==
- Order of the Friendship of Peoples (Belarus; November 22, 2004)
- Order of Friendship of Peoples (Bashkortostan, Russia; 2021)

== See also ==
- Politics of Belarus

Political offices
Preceded by Ivan Ivanovich Antonovich	Minister of Foreign Affairs; 1998-2000	Succeeded by Mikhail Khvostov
