= Sergei Aleinik =

Belarusian politician

- Сяргей Алейнік; Сергей Алейник
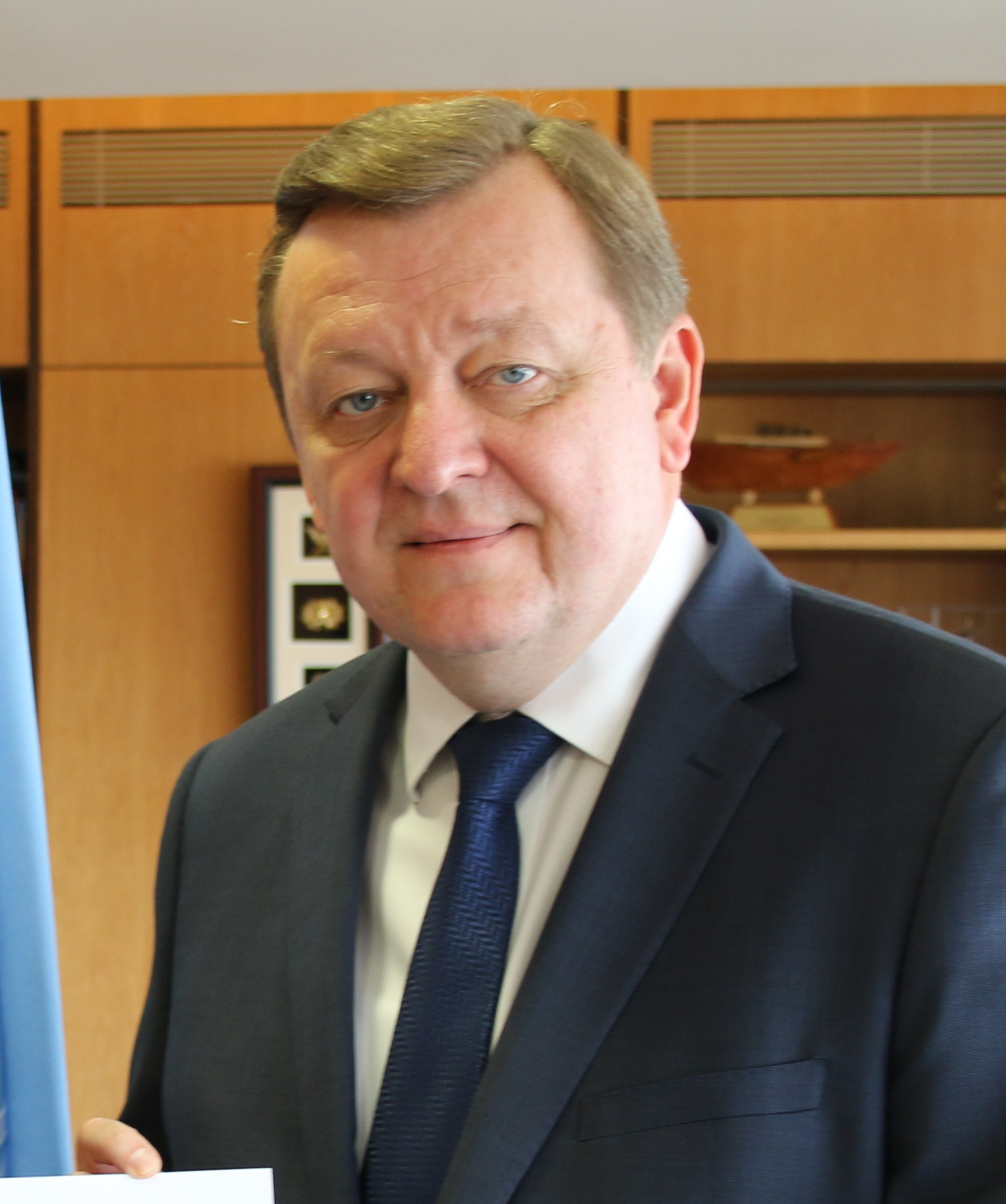
- Aleinik in 2019

Minister of Foreign Affairs
- In office 13 December 2022 – 27 June 2024
- President: Alexander Lukashenko
- Prime Minister: Roman Golovchenko
- Preceded by: Vladimir Makei
- Succeeded by: Maxim Ryzhenkov

Personal details
- Born: 28 January 1965 (age 61) Minsk, Belarusian SSR, Soviet Union
- Education: Minsk State Linguistic University

Sergei Fyodorovich Aleinik (Note: Belarusian: Сяргей Фёдаравіч Алейнік, romanized: Siarhiej Fiodaravič Aliejnik; Russian: Сергей Фёдорович Алейник, romanized: Sergey Fodorovich Aleynik) (born 28 January 1965) is a Belarusian politician who served as Minister of Foreign Affairs of Belarus from 2022 to 2024.

== Early life and education ==
Sergei Aleinik was born and raised in Belarus. He studied German and English at the Minsk State Pedagogic Institute of Foreign Languages and the Diplomatic Academy in Vienna. He taught both subjects for years. In the early 1990s, Aleinik enrolled for a post-graduate study in International Relations at The Diplomatic Academy of the Ministry of Foreign Affairs of Austria.

== Career ==
He began his career as an academic teaching German and English. Following Belarusian independence in the 1990s, Aleinik joined the foreign ministry of Belarus. In 1995, he embarked on his first diplomatic posting at a consul in The Hague and later became the chargé d'affaires in the Netherlands. While in the Netherlands, he was promoted to the rank of ambassador and deployed to the United Nations Office in Geneva with accreditation to the Holy See and the Sovereign Order of Malta. In Malta, he was awarded the Grand Cross pro Merito Melitensi of the Sovereign Order of Malta.

In 2009, he was appointed deputy foreign minister of Belarus in charge of bilateral relations with African, Asian and South American countries with specific task to widen Belarusian diplomatic relations. During his term in office, he established diplomatic relations with Nigeria, Ethiopia, Indonesia and Brazil.

In 2013, he is appointed Ambassador to the United Kingdom, with concurrent accreditation to Ireland as non-resident

In December 2022, he was appointed Minister of Foreign Affairs of Belarus.

On 27 June 2024, Sergei Aleinik was relieved of his post as Minister of Foreign Affairs and appointed as a member of the Council of the Republic of the National Assembly of the Republic of Belarus.
