= Kuzma Kiselyov =

Soviet and Byelorussian diplomat, statesman and politician

1st Minister of Foreign Affairs of the Byelorussian Soviet Socialist Republic
- In office 15 March 1946 – 14 May 1966
- Preceded by: Office established
- Succeeded by: Anatoly Gurinovich

Chairman of the Council of People's Commissars of the Byelorussian SSR (Head of government of the Byelorussian SSR)
- In office 28 July 1938 – 28 June 1940
- Leader: Panteleimon Ponomarenko
- Head of state: Nikifor Natalevich
- Preceded by: Afanasy Kovalyov
- Succeeded by: Ivan Bylinsky

Personal details
- Born: 1 November 1903 Lobkovichi, Mogilev Governorate, Russian Empire
- Died: 4 May 1977 (aged 73)
- Party: Communist Party of the Soviet Union

Kuzma Venediktovich Kiselyov (Russian: Кузьма́ Венеди́ктович Киселёв, Belarusian: Кузьма Венедыктавіч Кісялёў, 1 November 1903 – 4 May 1977) was a Soviet and Belarusian diplomat, statesman, and politician. From 15 March 1946 to 14 May 1966, he served as the first Minister of Foreign Affairs of the Byelorussian Soviet Socialist Republic. He also served as the chairman of the Council of Ministers of the Byelorussian Soviet Socialist Republic from 28 June 1938 to 28 June 1940. He was born in the Mogilev Governorate and died in Minsk.
