= Permanent Representative of Belarus to the United Nations =

Diplomatic office

- Flag of the United Nations
- Incumbent; Valentin Rybakov since 2017
- Formation: October 24, 1945
- Website: Official MFA page

This is a list of the Permanent Representatives of Belarus to the United Nations. Permanent Representative is the head of the permanent mission of Belarus to the United Nations. The current officeholder is Valentin Rybakov, since August 7, 2017.

== History ==
26 June 1945 was signed the Charter of the United Nations and came into force on 24 October 1945. The Byelorussian Soviet Socialist Republic was among the first countries that signed the United Nations Charter, becoming a founding member of the United Nations among 51 countries.

Until 1958, the permanent mission of Byelorussia was led by the Minister of Foreign Affairs rather than the permanent representative.

Since Belarus's independence in August 1991, membership in the United Nations is a priority of Belarusine's foreign policy.

== Permanent Mission Composition ==
The permanent mission of Belarus consists of permanent representative, three counsellors (one of which is a permanent representative deputy) and a military adviser. The permanent mission also includes about 10 various secretaries and attachés.

== Permanent Representatives of the Republic of Belarus to the United Nations ==
Permanent Representative of Belarus to the United Nations
Permanent Representative	Date
Byelorussian Soviet Socialist Republic (1920–1991) •
Feodosiy Hryaznov	(1958–1961)
Pavel Astapenko	(1961–1964)
Herodotus Chernushchenko	(1964–1967)
Vitaly Smirnov	(1967–1974)
Herodotus Chernushchenko	(1974–1977)
Leonid Dolguchits	(1977–1980)
Anatoly Sheldov	(1980–1986)
Lev Maksimov	(1986–1990)
Republic of Belarus (1991–present) •
Hienadz Buraukin	(1990–1994)
Alexander Sichov	(1994–2000)
Sergey Ling	(2000–2002)
Andrei Dapkiunas	(2004–2017)
Valentin Rybakov	(since 2017)
