= Piatro Kravchanka =

Belarusian politician and diplomat (born 1950)

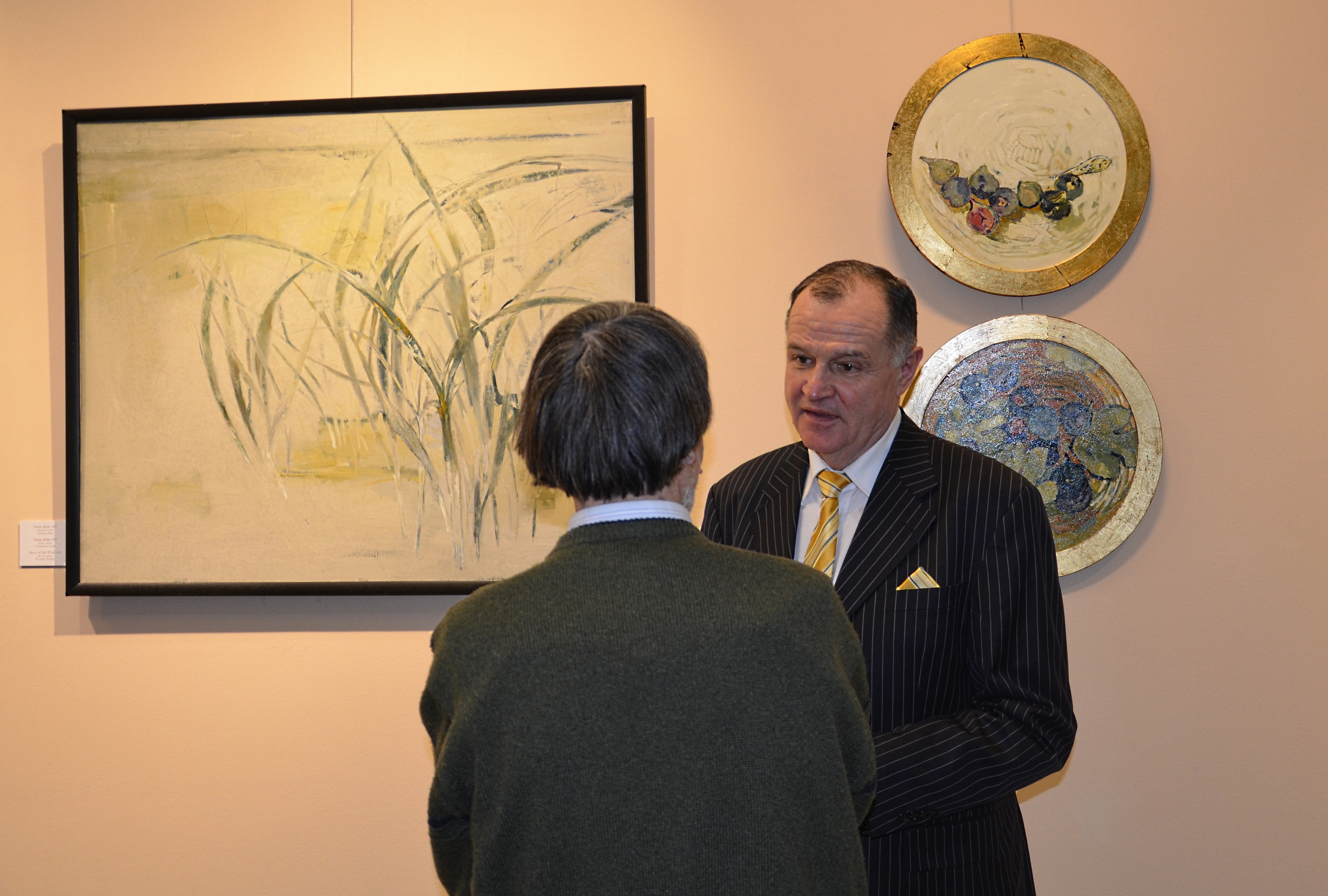

Minister of Foreign Affairs of Belarus
- In office 19 September 1991 – 28 July 1994
- Leader: Stanislav Shushkevich
- Preceded by: Position established
- Succeeded by: Uladzimir Syanko

3rd Minister of Foreign Affairs of the Byelorussian SSR
- In office 27 July 1990 – 19 September 1991
- First Secretary: Yefrem Sokolov
- Preceded by: Anatoly Gurinovich
- Succeeded by: Position abolished

Personal details
- Born: 13 August 1950 (age 76) Smalyavichy, Minsk Region, Byelorussia SSR, Soviet Union
- Party: Communist Party of the Soviet Union
- Education: Belarusian State University

Piatro Kuzmich Kravchanka (Belarusian: Пятро Кузьміч Краўчанка; born 13 August 1950) is a Belarusian diplomat, political scientist, historian and politician. He was the last foreign minister of the Byelorussian SSR for ten days from 17 to 27 July 1990. He became the first Minister of Foreign Affairs from 1990 to 1994. He served as a deputy leader of Supreme Soviet of Belarus from 15 May 1990 to 27 November 1996.

Piotr Kravchenko was born on 13 August 1950 in Smalyavichy in Byelorussian SSR. He graduated at Belarusian State University from 1972 to 1976. Since 1975, he worked there as a lecturer. In 1985, he was appointed by general secretary of Communist Party of the Soviet Union Mikhail Gorbachev as First Secretary of the Minsk City Committee of the CPB. He was the Belarus Ambassador to Japan from 1999 to 2002.

== Personal life ==
Kravchenko is married to his wife and has two children. He is a practising Roman Catholic.

Political offices
Preceded by Anatoly Gurinovich	Foreign Minister of the Byelorussian SSR; 1990–1991	Succeeded by Office Abolished
Party political offices
Preceded by Office established	Foreign Minister of Belarus; 1991–1994	Succeeded by Uladzimir Syanko
