= Mikhail Khvostov =

Belarusian diplomat

- Михаил Хвостов; Міхаіл Хвастоў

Ambassador of Belarus to the United States
- In office 23 March 2003 – 4 June 2009
- President: Alexander Lukashenko
- Preceded by: Valery Tsepkalo
- Succeeded by: Aleh Kravchanka

Minister of Foreign Affairs
- In office 27 November 2000 – 21 March 2003
- President: Alexander Lukashenko
- Preceded by: Ural Latypov
- Succeeded by: Sergei Martynov

Personal details
- Born: Mikhail Mikhailovych Kvostov; 27 June 1949 Kozlovshina, Belarus, Soviet Union

Mikhail Mikhailovich Khvostov (Belarusian: Міхаіл Міхайлавіч Хвастоў, romanized: Mikhail Khvastow; born on 27 June 1949) is a Belarusian politician and diplomat has served as the ambassador of Belarus to the United States from 2003 to 2009. He was also accredited as a nonresident ambassador to Mexico.

From 1991 to 1992, Khvostov was first secretary at the Belarusian mission to the United Nations, and from 1992 to 1993 was first secretary at the Belarusian embassy to the United States. He was ambassador to Canada from 1997 to 2000, and was then adviser to Belarusian President Alexander Lukashenko, as well as Deputy Prime Minister and Foreign Minister.

Ambassador Khvostov previously served in Washington from 1992 to 1993 as first secretary at the Embassy of Belarus, as well as first secretary at the Belarus Permanent Mission to the United Nations in New York (1991–92). More recently, Ambassador Khvostov served as ambassador to Canada (1997–2000) before becoming an adviser to the president of Belarus, deputy prime minister and minister of foreign affairs (2000–03). Ambassador Khvostov also served as his nation's deputy minister of foreign affairs (1994–97) and as director of the State Protocol Department and the Legal and Treaties Department of the Ministry of Foreign Affairs (1993–94), in addition to holding various posts within the ministry from 1982 to 1991.

Additionally, Khostov is a member of the Netherlands-based Permanent Court of Arbitration.

Khostov is a graduate of the Minsk State Linguistic University and the Belarusian State University, and is a married father of two.
