= Sergei Martynov (politician) =

Belarusian politician

- Сергей Мартынов; Сяргей Мартынаў
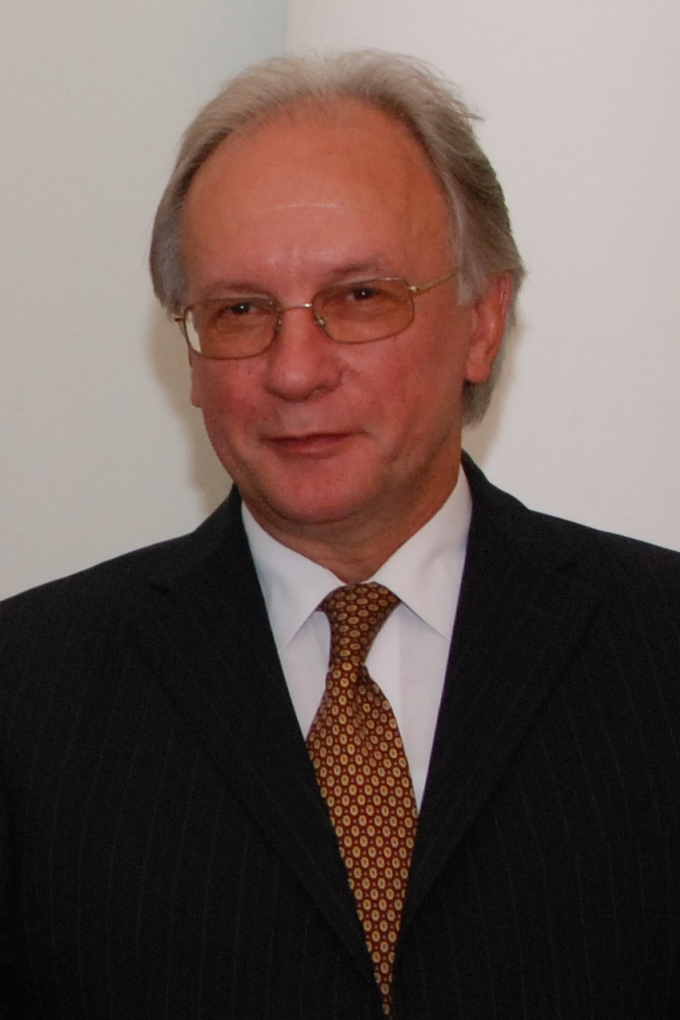
- Martynov in August 2010

Minister of Foreign Affairs
- In office 21 March 2003 – 20 August 2012
- President: Alexander Lukashenko
- Preceded by: Mikhail Khvostov
- Succeeded by: Vladimir Makei

Personal details
- Born: 21 February 1953 Gyumri, Armenian SSR, Soviet Union

Sergei Nikolaevich Martynov (Belarusian: Сяргей Мікалаевіч Мартынаў, Russian: Серге́й Николаевич Мартынов; born 22 February 1953) is a Belarusian politician who was Minister for Foreign Affairs of Belarus from 2003 to 2012.

== Biography ==
Sergei Martynov was born on 22 February 1953 in Leninakan (now Gyumri), Armenian SSR. He graduated from the Moscow State Institute of International Relations in 1975.

Between 1980 and 1988 he was assistant to the Minister of Foreign Affairs of the BSSR, then until 1991 he was deputy head of the department of international organizations of the Ministry of Foreign Affairs. He was then from 1991 to 1992 Deputy Permanent Representative of Belarus to the United Nations, and was for a year after that Chargé d'Affaires of Belarus to the United States.

He previously served in the diplomatic representation of Belarus as the ambassador to the United States between 1993 and 1997, and since 1994 as the non-resident ambassador to Mexico. Before his appointment as foreign minister, he also served as ambassador to Belgium, the EU and to NATO between 2001 and 2003. Sergei Martynov was appointed to the post of Foreign Minister of Belarus in March 2003 and dismissed in August 2012. In this role, he called for increased cooperation with the UN and to support more talented young people. He was dismissed without a reason provided in August 2012 and succeeded by Vladimir Makei. He was dismissed after the Teddybear Airdrop row between Belarus and the European Union when to promote pro-democracy teddy bears were air-dropped over Belarus.

He is fluent in Russian, English, French, and Swahili.
