= Uladzimir Syanko =

Belarusian diplomat and politician

Minister of Foreign Affairs
- In office 28 July 1994 – 13 January 1997
- Preceded by: Piotr Kravchenko
- Succeeded by: Ivan Ivanovich Antonovich

Personal details
- Born: 5 August 1946 (age 80) Chashniki Raion, Vitebsk Region, Byelorussian SSR
- Party: Communist Party of the Soviet Union
- Education: Moscow State Institute of International Relations; Diplomatic Academy of the Ministry of Foreign Affairs of the Russian Federation

Uladzimir Leonavich Syanko (Belarusian: Уладзімір Лявонавіч Сянько, born 5 August 1946) is a former Belarusian diplomat and politician who was the Minister of Foreign Affairs, from 1994 to 1997. From 1994 to 2004 he was an ambassador to France, Spain, and Portugal, and from 2004 to 2011 he represented Belarus in Belgium, the EU and NATO. He was also a member of the Council of the Republic of Belarus from 2012 to 2016.

Syanko graduated from the Moscow State Institute of International Relations in 1973 and from the Diplomatic Academy of the Ministry of Foreign Affairs of the Russian Federation in 1987.

== Awards ==
- Commendation of the Council of Ministers of the Republic of Belarus (April 3, 2006) — for high achievements in the productive and socio-cultural spheres, significant personal contribution to the implementation of projected indicators of the socio-economic development of the republic in 2001-2005

Political offices
Preceded by Piotr Kravchenko	Minister of Foreign Affairs; 1994-1997	Succeeded by Ivan Ivanovich Antonovich
