= Hienadz Buraukin =

Belarusian poet, journalist, and diplomat (1936–2014)

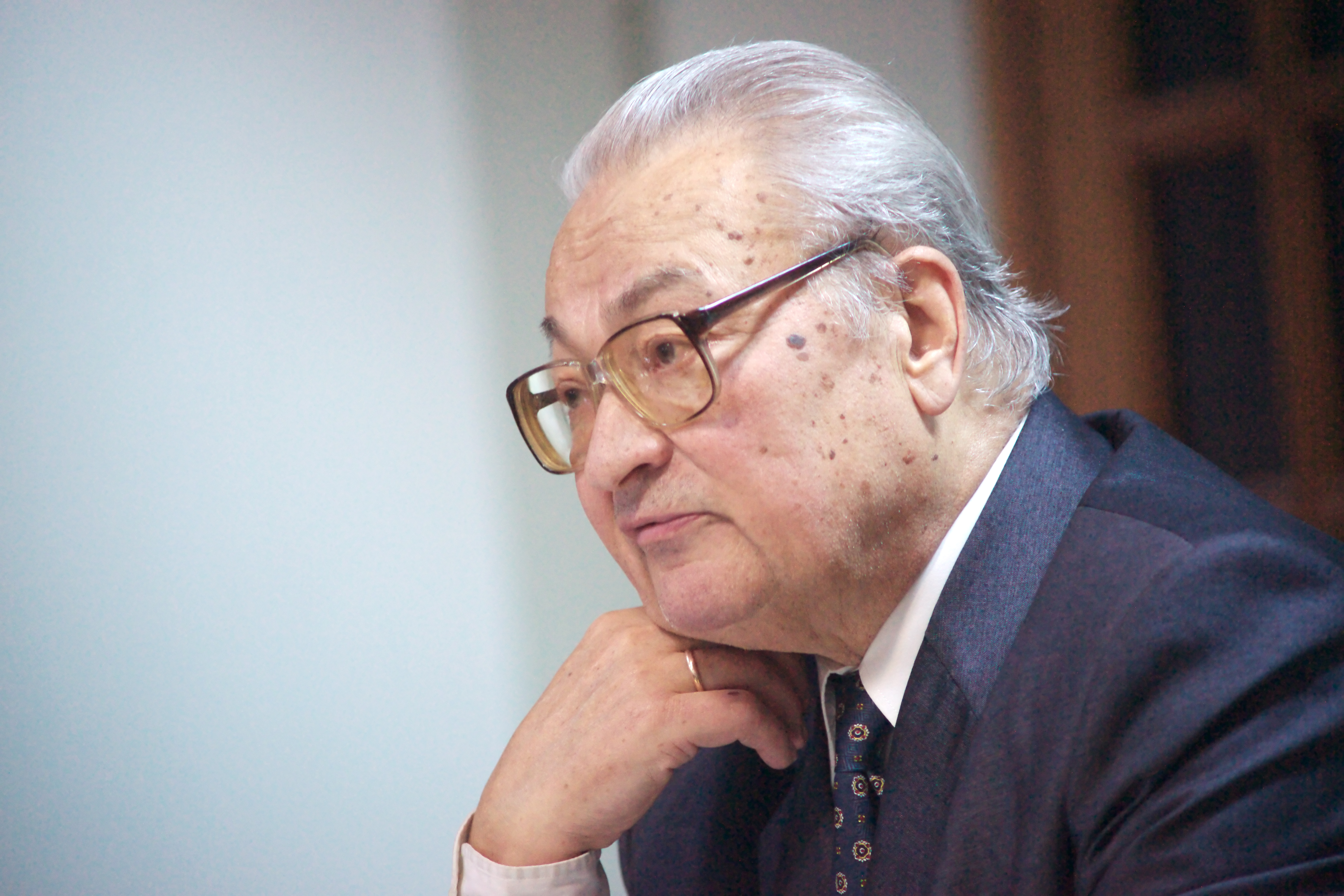
- Buraukin in 2013
- Born: Генадзь Бураўкін; 28 August 1936; Vitebsk Region, Rasony District, BSSR
- Died: 30 May 2014 (aged 77); Minsk, Belarus
- Occupations: Poet, journalist and diplomat

Hienadz Mikalaevich Buraukin (Belarusian: Гена́дзь Мікала́евіч Бура́ўкін, Russian: Генна́дий Никола́евич Бура́вкин; 28 August 1936 – 30 May 2014) was a Belarusian poet, journalist and diplomat.

== Biography ==
He was born in the village of Shuliacina in Vitebsk Region. In 1959, he graduated from the Belarusian State University.

During his career, he was chief reporter of the Soviet state newspaper Pravda in Belarus. In 1969, he helped Zianon Pazniak to publish several articles on preservation of architectural heritage of Belarus.

From 1972 to 1978, Buraukin was chief editor of the Belarus-wide magazine Maladosts, where he published numerous works of Vasil Bykaŭ and Uladzimir Karatkievich. Being member of the parliament from 1980 to 1990, he was one of the promoters of a law that improved the status of the Belarusian language in BSSR.

From 1978 to 1990, he was chief of State Television and Radio-company of Belarus, but was dismissed from the position for granting broadcasting possibilities for members of the democratic opposition.

From 1990 till 1994, Buraukin was accredited Permanent Representative of Belarus to the United Nations. In the 1990s, Buraukin was also head of the Francišak Skaryna Belarusian Language Society.

Buraukin died from cancer on 30 May 2014 in Minsk at the age of 77.

== Literary work and awards ==
Buraukin was the author of numerous poetic books. Many of his poems became lyrics for songs, including a famous lullaby. For his literature works, he was awarded the Leninist Komsomol Prize of Belarus (1972) and the Yanka Kupala State Literature Prize (1980).
