= Anatoly Glaz =

Belarusian spokesman

Anatoly Glaz Anatol Hlaz
- Анатолий Глаз; Анатоль Глаз

Spokesperson of the Ministry of Foreign Affairs of Belarus
- In office 11 June 2018 – 14 January 2025
- President: Alexander Lukashenko
- Minister: Vladimir Makei
- Preceded by: Dmitry Mironchyk

Ambassador of the Republic of Belarus to the Republic of Turkey
- Incumbent
- Assumed office 14 January 2025
- President: Alexander Lukashenko
- Preceded by: Viktor Rybak

Personal details
- Born: July 31, 1982 (age 44)

Anatoly Anatolevich Glaz (Russian: Анатолий Анатольевич Глаз, Belarusian: Анатоль Анатолевіч Глаз, romanized: Anatol Anatolievich Hlaz, born 31 July 1982) is a Belarusian diplomat and Belarus ambassador to Turkey and Iraq. Previously, he was a spokesperson of the Ministry of Foreign Affairs of Belarus.

== Biography ==
Glaz was born into the family of Anatol Tikhanovich Glaz, a Communist Party official in regional Belarus. His father was member of the National Assembly of Belarus between 2008 and 2012.

Glaz joined the Foreign Ministry of Belarus in 2005. Between 2007 and 2009 he worked at the embassy of Belarus in Italy.

From 2009 till 2014 he worked as a foreign policy advisor at the administration of Alexander Lukashenko.

From 2014 to 2018 he again worked at the embassy of Belarus in Rome.

Soon after returning to Minsk in 2018, Glaz was appointed head of the Department of Information and Digital Diplomacy (spokesperson) of the Ministry of Foreign Affairs of Belarus.

On 14 January 2025, Glaz was appointed ambassador to Turkey. On March 27, he was also appointed non-residential ambassador to Iraq.

== Activity as a spokesperson of the Lukashenko administration ==
Anatoly Glaz acted as an official international spokesperson of the administration of Alexander Lukashenko during the crackdown of mass protests that followed a controversial presidential election.

Glaz voiced criticism against international sanctions against the Lukashenko administration, prolongation of the mandate of the Special Rapporteur on the situation of human rights in Belarus

On 2 December 2021, Anatoly Glaz was banned from entering the European Union. Switzerland joined the EU sanctions on 20 December.
