= Maxim Ryzhenkov =

Belarusian politician (born 1972)

- Максим Рыженков
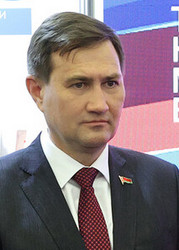
- Ryzhenkov in 2023

Minister of Foreign Affairs
- Incumbent
- Assumed office 27 June 2024
- President: Alexander Lukashenko
- Preceded by: Sergei Aleinik

First Deputy Head of the Presidential Administration of Belarus
- In office 21 December 2016 – 27 June 2024
- President: Alexander Lukashenko
- Preceded by: Konstantin Martynetsky
- Succeeded by: Natalia Petkevich

Personal details
- Born: 19 June 1972 (age 54) Minsk, Byelorussian SSR, Soviet Union
- Education: Belarusian State University
- Awards: Order of Honor (Belarus)

Maxim Vladimirovich Ryzhenkov (Belarusian: Максім Уладзіміравіч Рыжанкоў, romanized: Maksim Uładzimiravič Ryžankoŭ, Russian: Максим Владимирович Рыженков; born 19 June 1972) is a Belarusian politician serving as minister of foreign affairs since 2024.

== Early life and education ==
Maxim Ryzhenkov was born in Minsk on June 19, 1972, the son of Vladimir Ryzhenkov, who served as President of the Belarus Olympic Committee from 1991 to 1996 and Minister of Sports from 1995 to 1996.

He graduated from the Faculty of Law at Belarusian State University in 1994 with a degree in international law.

In 2003, he obtained a degree in state and local administration from the Presidential Academy of Public Administration.

== Career ==
Maxim Ryzhenkov joined the Ministry of Foreign Affairs of Belarus in 1994. He served at the Belarusian Embassy in Israel from 1996 to 2000 and at the Embassy of Poland from 2003 to 2005.

Between 2006 and 2012, he headed the foreign policy department of the Presidential Administration. In 2012, he was appointed Assistant to the President for Sports and Tourism.

Following a brief appointment as Vice-President of the National Olympic Committee from 2015 to 2016, he returned to the Presidential Administration, serving as First Deputy Head from 21 December 2016 to 27 June 2024 when he was appointed Foreign Minister.

Since 2014, he has also been the president of the Belarusian Basketball Federation.

Maxim Ryzhenkov holds the diplomatic rank of the Ambassador Extraordinary and Plenipotentiary.

== International sanctions ==
Following the 2020 Belarusian presidential election, Ryzhenkov was added to the various sanctions lists, first by the Baltic states in late August 2020, then by the European Union, the United Kingdom, and Canada in June 2021, and shortly thereafter by Switzerland, and several EU-aligned countries.

== Personal life ==
Maxim Ryzhenkov is married to the former wife of Pavel Latushko, they have a daughter born in 2008.

He speaks English and Polish.

== Orders and honors ==
- Order of Honor (Belarus, 2022)
- Honorary Certificate of National Assembly of the Republic of Belarus (Belarus, 2014)
- Honorary member of Belarusian Chess Federation (2017)
