= Ministry of Foreign Affairs (Belarus) =

Government ministry of Belarus

Ministry of Foreign Affairs of the Republic of Belarus
- Міністэрства замежных спраў Рэспублікі Беларусь; Ministerstva zamezhnykh spraw Respubliki Belarus
- Emblem of the Ministry

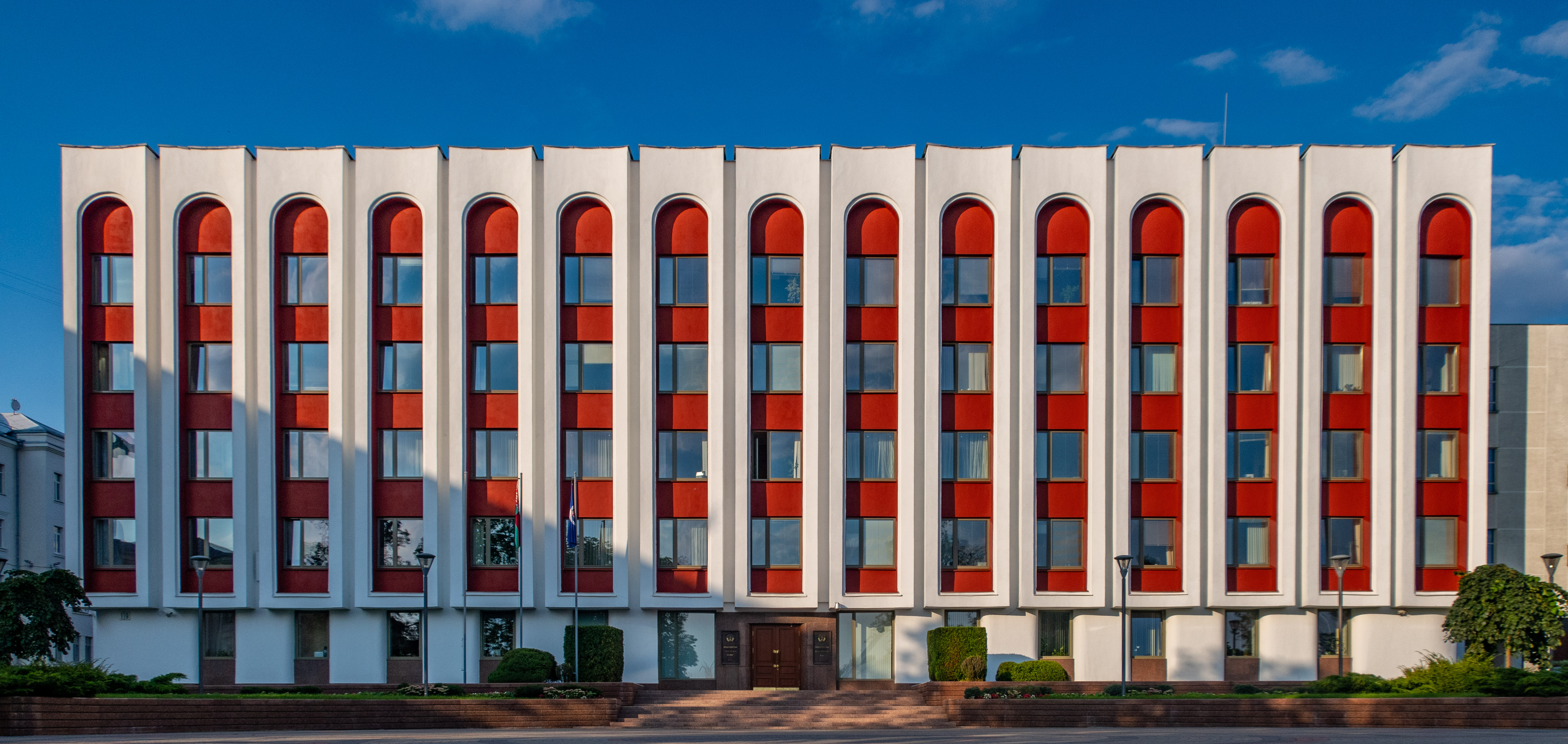
- Main office in Minsk

Agency overview
- Formed: September 19, 1991
- Preceding agencies: \Ministry of Foreign Affairs of the Byelorussian SSR; Ministry of Foreign Affairs of the Soviet Union
- Jurisdiction: Government of Belarus
- Headquarters: Minsk, Belarus; 53°53′53″N 27°33′49″E
- Minister responsible: Maxim Ryzhenkov
- Deputy Ministers responsible: Sergey Lukashevich; Evgeny Shestakov; Pavel Utyupin; Igor Sekreta
- Website: www.mfa.gov.by

Flag of the Ministry

The Ministry of Foreign Affairs of the Republic of Belarus (Belarusian: Міністэрства замежных спраў Рэспублікі Беларусь, BGN/PCGN: Ministerstva zamiežnykh spraú Respubliki Bielarus’; Russian: Министерство иностранных дел Республики Беларусь, BGN/PCGN: Ministerstvo inostrannyh del Respubliki Belarus’) is the Belarusian government ministry which oversees the foreign relations of Belarus.

The current Minister of Foreign Affairs is Maxim Ryzhenkov, since June 2024. Anatoly Glaz, a diplomat and spokesperson of the Ministry, has voiced criticism of international sanctions against the Lukashenko regime and justified bans on foreign journalists from working in Belarus.

== History ==
=== Historical lineage ===
In December 1920, the People's Commissariat for Foreign Affairs was established by resolution of the Second Congress of Soviets of Belarus. With the 1922 formation of the USSR, the functions of representing the Soviet republics in the international arena passed into the national jurisdiction. On 1 February 1944, the Supreme Soviet of the USSR adopted a law on giving the Union Republics powers in the field of foreign policy. The People’s Commissariat of Foreign Affairs of the Belarusian SSR was then established on 24 March that year as a direct result of a resolution passed by the Supreme Soviet. According to this law, the union republics received the right to enter into direct relations with foreign states, conclude agreements with them and exchange diplomatic and consular missions. The structure of the People's Commissariat included the political, protocol and consular departments, the personnel department and the administration of affairs. The staff of the People's Commissariat totaled 27 people. By decree of the Presidium of the Supreme Soviet of Belarus on 26 March 1946, the People's Commissariat was transformed into the Ministry of Foreign Affairs. Exactly 12 years later, the Council of Ministers gave the order for the ministry to represent the BSSR at the United Nations.

=== Post-Soviet Union ===
On 19 September 1991, the ministry become known as the Ministry of Foreign Affairs of the Republic of Belarus, effective on this day from a national law adopted at the extraordinary session of the Supreme Soviet. The ministry then became subordinate to the Council of Ministers of the Republic of Belarus. By a decree of President Alexander Lukashenko on 4 December 1998, the ministry was reorganized by abolishing three ministries: foreign affairs, CIS affairs and foreign economic relations. The new most recent regulation on the ministry was approved by decree in July 2006. As of December 2008, the Republic of Belarus maintains diplomatic relations with 164 countries of the world, in 47 of which 60 diplomatic missions are opened. Among them are 45 embassies, 7 permanent missions to international organizations, 7 general consulates and 1 consulate. Twelve branches of the embassies of the Republic of Belarus also operate abroad.

== Ministers of Foreign Affairs ==
=== Belarusian People's Republic ===
- Yazep Varonka 1918
- Anton Lutskevich 1918–20

=== Belarusian SSR ===
- Kuzma Kisyalyou 1944–66
- Anatol Hurynovich 1966–90
- Piatro Kravchanka 1990–91

=== Republic of Belarus ===
- Piatro Kravchanka 1991–94
- Uladzimir Syanko 1994–97
- Ivan Antanovich 1997–98
- Ural Latypov 1998–2000
- Mikhail Khvostov 2000–03
- Sergei Martynov 2003–12
- Vladimir Makei 2012–22
- Sergei Aleinik 2022–2024
- Maxim Ryzhenkov 2024–present

== Structure ==
The structure of the Ministry of Foreign Affairs of the Republic of Belarus as of August 2019:

- Minister of Foreign Affairs (Vacant)
- First Deputy Minister (position vacant)
  - General Legal Department
    - International Treaty Office
      - Department of bilateral treaties
      - Department of Multilateral Treaties
    - Legal department
  - Office of Russia and the Union State
    - Department for the Development of Allied Relations
    - Department for the implementation of economic programs
  - Management of regions of Russia
    - Department of the Center, Volga and South of Russia
    - Department of the North-West, Urals, Siberia and the Far East
  - Office of the Commonwealth of Independent States and the Eurasian Economic Community
  - Office of bilateral relations with the countries of the Commonwealth of Independent States
  - Office of International Security and Arms Control
    - Department of Ukraine, Moldova and Transcaucasia
    - Department of Central Asia
- Deputy Minister (Sergey Aleinik)
  - Main organizational and control department
    - Office of documentation and control
      - Department of organizational work
      - Department of documentation and control
      - Historical and Archival Department
    - Office of coordination and planning
    - UNESCO Secretariat
    - Office of America
      - Department of Latin America
      - US and Canada Division
    - Office of Asia and Africa
      - Department of Asia
      - Department of Africa and the Middle East
- General Directorate of International Diplomacy
  - Office of Global Politics and Humanitarian Cooperation
  - Office of Economic Cooperation and Sustainable Development
- Deputy Minister
  - European Headquarters
    - Bilateral Cooperation Office
      - Central Europe Department
      - Department of Northern Europe
      - Department of Western Europe
    - Office of Pan-European Cooperation
      - Division of the Organization for Security and Co-operation in Europe and the Council of Europe
      - Department of European Integration
  - Department of Foreign Policy Analysis
  - Information Management
    - Press Department
    - Information Support Department
  - State Protocol Service
    - Department of visits
    - Department for work with the diplomatic corps
    - Protocol Sector
  - Main consular department
    - Management of analysis, planning, visa and tariff policies
    - Consular Legal Department
    - Department of Citizenship and Travel Abroad
    - Office for Foreigners
  - Monetary and financial management
    - Department of accounting and reporting of the central office
    - Department of financing and reporting of foreign agencies
    - Department of methodology and control and audit work
  - Department of providing diplomatic services
    - Logistics Department
    - Department of construction and real estate
- Deputy Minister (Alexander Guryanov)
  - Department of Foreign Economic Affairs
    - Export Support Office
      - Department of export and investment promotion
      - Analysis and Planning Department
      - Department for work with foreign missions
    - Department of Foreign Trade Policy
      - Department of protective measures and market access
      - Department of customs and tariff regulation and negotiations with the WTO
  - Office of Information Technology
  - Office of Diplomatic Security
    - Security Department
    - Special Communications Department
    - Security Engineering Department
- HR management
  - HR department
  - Training Department
- Ambassador on special assignments
- Ambassador-at-Large

== See also ==
- Foreign relations of Belarus
