= Anatoly Gurinovich =

Belarusian statesman and diplomat

2nd Minister of Foreign Affairs of the Byelorussian Soviet Socialist Republic
- In office 14 May 1966 – 17 July 1990
- Preceded by: Kuzma Kiselyov
- Succeeded by: Piotr Kravchenko

Personal details
- Born: 9 September 1924 Chervyen Raion, Minsk Region, Byelorussian SSR
- Died: 9 April 1999 (aged 74) Pukhavichy Raion, Belarus
- Party: Communist Party of the Soviet Union
- Education: Belarusian State Economic University; Diplomatic Academy of the Ministry of Foreign Affairs of the Russian Federation
- Occupation: diplomat, statesman

Anatoly Yemelyanovich Gurinovich (Belarusian: Анато́ль Емелья́навіч Гурыно́віч; 9 September 1924 – 9 April 1999) was a Belarusian statesman and diplomat from Byelorussian SSR. He served as the second foreign minister of Byelorussian SSR from 14 May 1966 to 17 July 1990 for 24 years after replacing Kuzma Kiselyov. He graduated from the Belarus State Economic University and in 1951, he joined the Diplomatic Academy of the Ministry of Foreign Affairs of the Russian Federation. He died on 9 April 1999, aged 74.

The secondary school where he attended in Perezhir, Pukhavichy District, was named after him.

Political offices
Preceded by Kuzma Kiselyov	Foreign Minister of the Byelorussian Soviet Socialist Republic; 1966–1990	Succeeded by Piotr Kravchenko
