= Vladimir Makei =

Belarusian politician (1958–2022)

Uładzimir Makiej
- Владимир Макей (Russian); Уладзімір Макей (Ukrainian)
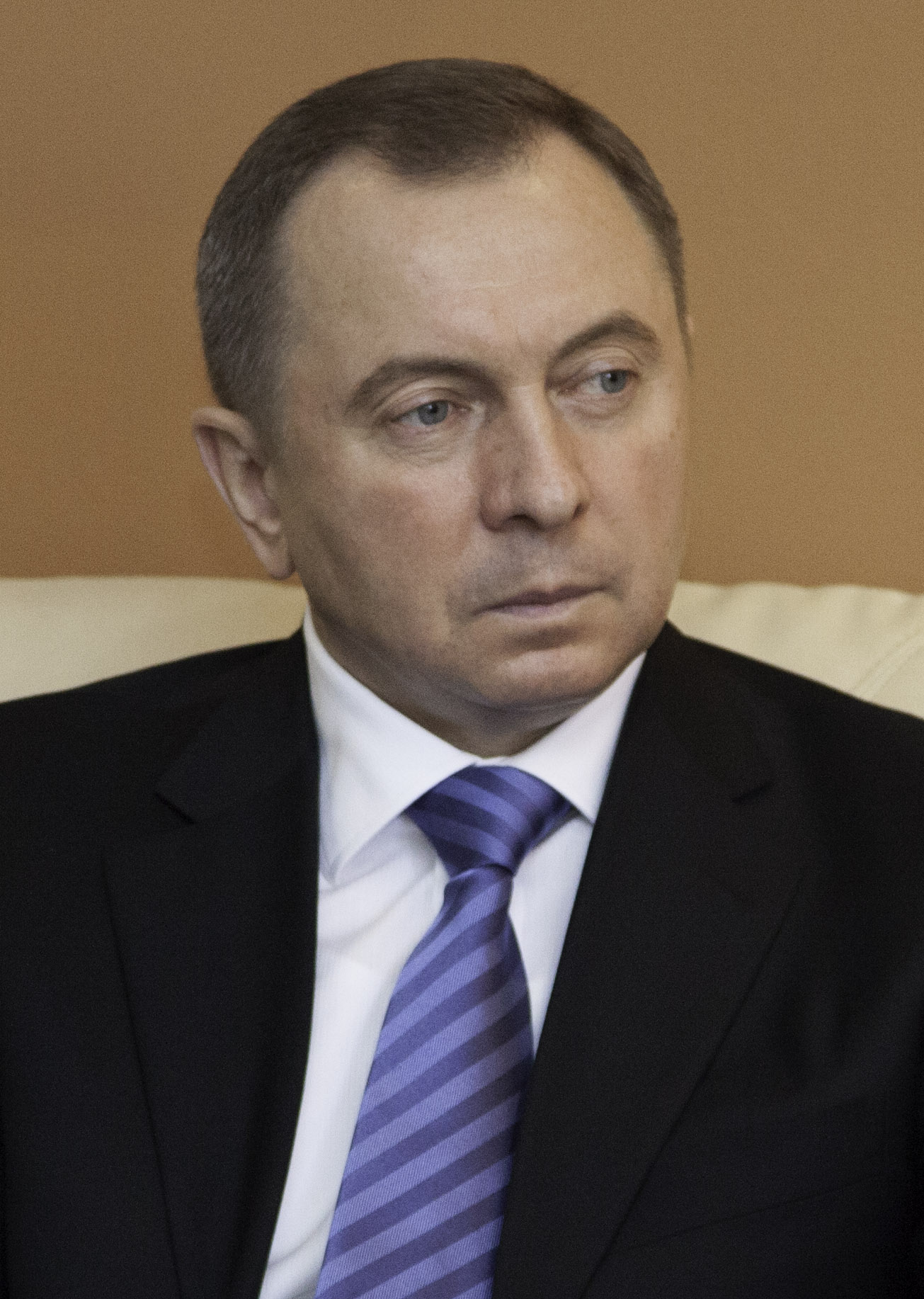
- Makei in 2014

Minister of Foreign Affairs
- In office 20 August 2012 – 26 November 2022
- President: Alexander Lukashenko
- Prime Minister: Mikhail Myasnikovich; Andrei Kobyakov; Syarhey Rumas; Roman Golovchenko
- Preceded by: Sergei Martynov
- Succeeded by: Sergei Aleinik

Personal details
- Born: 5 August 1958 Grodno Region, Byelorussian SSR, Soviet Union
- Died: 26 November 2022 (aged 64)
- Spouse: Vera Polyakova
- Children: 2
- Education: Minsk State Linguistic University

Military service
- Allegiance: Soviet Union / Belarus
- Branch/service: Soviet Army; Armed Forces of Belarus
- Rank: Colonel

Uładzimir Uładzimiravič Makiej (Russian: Владимир Владимирович Макей, romanized: Vladimir Vladimirovich Makei; Belarusian: Уладзімір Уладзіміравіч Макей; 5 August 1958 – 26 November 2022) was a Belarusian politician who served as Minister of Foreign Affairs of Belarus from 2012 until his death in 2022.

== Early life and education ==
Vladimir Makei was born on 5 August 1958 in Grodno Region, Byelorussian SSR. He graduated from the Minsk State Pedagogical Institute of Foreign Languages in 1980. He served in the Armed Forces of the USSR and in the Armed Forces of Belarus after the dissolution of the Soviet Union. He retired in 1993 as a colonel.

== Career ==
Makei served in the ministry as secretary of several departments: Information and Humanitarian Cooperation, Analysis and Forecast, Office of the Minister and State Protocol Service. From 1996 to 1999 he worked in the Belarusian embassy in Paris as a counselor. From 2008 to 2012 he was President Alexander Lukashenko's Chief of Staff. Since 20 August 2012 he had been Minister of Foreign Affairs. In January 2011, Makei was blacklisted by the European Union following the presidential election and the subsequent protests; however, the ban was lifted a year after Makei's ministerial appointment in order to ease diplomatic contacts with Belarus.

During the 2020 Belarusian protests, Makei said at a meeting in the Ministry of Foreign Affairs that everyone who disagrees with the state policy should leave the ministry. He also forbade the staff to participate in protest activities. Two employees who made a picket with blank sheets of paper were fired within a week (one of them told journalists that he was fired for "gross violation of his duties"). In February 2021, Makei accused diplomats of calling for unrest and posting "anti-state" information. On April 10, 2021, Makei threatened that civil society in Belarus “will cease to exist” in the case of tougher sanctions.

During his tenure as a Chief of Staff, Makei oversaw the governmental cooperation with the British PR firm Bell Pottinger. Mikalai Khalezin, director of the Belarus Free Theatre, claimed that Makei was responsible for trying to discredit his theatre for Khalezin's anti-Lukashenko activities. About a week before the 2010 election, Makei accused the Belarusian opposition of preparing armed provocations. Pavel Latushko, former ambassador to France and Poland, claimed that Makei expressed anti-Russian views in front of European and American diplomats, but after the 2020 elections he made a volte-face. Valery Sakhashchyk, a former Belarusian military officer serving in the United Transitional Cabinet stated that Makei, though having been “deformed by years of service to Lukashenko”, was "undoubtedly some kind of bridge with the West".

In June 2022, Makei was added to the Canadian sanctions list.

== Personal life ==
Makei spoke Belarusian, Russian, German, and English.

== Death ==
Makei died in office on 26 November 2022, at the age of 64. Makei was not known to have had a chronic illness, and Belarusian authorities did not state his cause of death. According to the Belarusian independent weekly newspaper Nasha Niva, he died of a heart attack. He was given a state funeral on 29 November 2022 which was attended by Lukashenko in the Central House of Officers; he was buried in Minsk's Eastern Cemetery.

=== Allegations of unnatural death ===
In February 2023, Nasha Niva presented evidence with a claim that Makei had taken his own life four days after returning from a Collective Security Treaty Organization summit in Armenia accompanying representatives of Vladimir Putin. The newspaper’s sources claimed that he had been denied attention from President Alexander Lukashenko, had realized that he was due to be replaced soon, and that “after his heights, he did not see himself anywhere else.” Furthermore, he was rumored to be having marital problems with his wife, Vera Polyakova. Further conspiracy theories persisted that Makei was poisoned by the Russian officials while attending the summit. Belarus has refused to disclose full details of Makei’s death, other than to suggest he suffered a heart attack.

The circumstances of Makei's death were later compared to Belarusian diplomat Dzianis Sidarenka's unexpected death in June 2024.

== Awards ==
- Order of Honor (Belarus, 2006)
- Order of the Fatherland, 3rd class (Belarus, 2018)

== See also ==
- Suspicious Russia-related deaths since 2022

Political offices
Preceded by Sergei Martynov	Minister of Foreign Affairs; 2012–2022	Succeeded by Sergei Aleinik
