= Alena Kupchyna =

Belarusian diplomat

Alena Kupchyna Алена Купчына
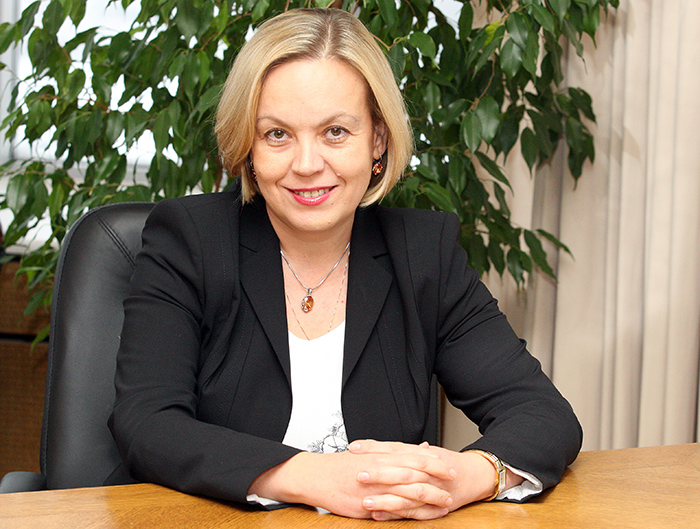

OSCE Co-ordinator of Activities to Address Transnational Threats
- Incumbent
- Assumed office February 25, 2020

Personal details
- Born: 14 August 1965 (age 61) Minsk, Soviet Union (now Belarus)
- Education: Belarusian State University
- Profession: Diplomat

Alena Mikalajeŭna Kupchyna (Belarusian: Алена Мікалаеўна Купчына; born August 14, 1965) is a Belarusian diplomat, currently serving as Co-ordinator of Activities to Address Transnational Threats at the Organization for Security and Co-operation in Europe (OSCE). Previously, she was the Ambassador Extraordinary and Plenipotentiary of the Republic of Belarus to the Republic of Austria and the Republic of Croatia (non-resident), as well as the Permanent Representative of Belarus to the OSCE.

She graduated with distinction from the Belarusian State University and completed post-graduate studies at the Belarusian Academy of Sciences.

She has been awarded with the Order of Honour of the Republic of Belarus and holds the diplomatic rank of Ambassador Extraordinary and Plenipotentiary.

== Biography ==
Born on August 14, 1965, in Minsk, Belarus, Kupchyna graduated with distinction from the Faculty of Law of the Belarusian State University in 1987. She earned the title of Doctor of Law in 1991, after completing the course of post-graduate studies at the Institute of Philosophy and Law of the Belarusian Academy of Sciences. She started her professional career as a research fellow at the Institute of Philosophy and Law of the Belarusian Academy of Sciences in 1990.

After joining the diplomatic service of Belarus in 1992 as Second Secretary in the International Treaties Division she quickly rose to the post of deputy director of the Legal Department in the Ministry of Foreign Affairs.

In 1995–1998, she worked as Counsellor and later Deputy Permanent Representative of Belarus to the UN Office and other international organizations in Geneva, where she was instrumental in bringing together countries working on the issues of disarmament, migration management and human rights.

Kupchyna held a number of senior leadership positions in the Belarusian Ministry of Foreign Affairs, including Director of the Department for Humanitarian, Ecological, Scientific and Technical Cooperation (2002–2004) and Director of the Department for Humanitarian Cooperation and Human Rights (2004–2006).

From 2006 to 2012, Kupchyna served as the Ambassador of Belarus to Hungary and, concurrently, to Slovenia.

From 2012 to 2016, Kupchyna held the position of Deputy Foreign Minister of Belarus in charge of relations with Europe, the OSCE and the Council of Europe.

In her capacity as Deputy Foreign Minister in charge of Europe, Ambassador Kupchyna made a substantial contribution to a successful development of relations between Belarus and European countries and institutions, including the OSCE.

Through her involvement in developing and overseeing the implementation of policies as Deputy Foreign Minister responsible for administration and finance, Kupchyna managed the activities of 25 Belarusian diplomatic missions and representations abroad. Her role included leadership and managerial responsibilities as a team leader.

In 2016, Kupchyna was appointed the Ambassador Extraordinary and Plenipotentiary of Belarus to Austria and, concurrently, to Croatia, as well as Permanent Representative of Belarus to the OSCE and International Organizations in Vienna.

== Personal life ==
She has one son. Besides native Belarusian and Russian, Ambassador Kupchyna speaks English and French.
