= Sergey Ling =

3rd Prime Minister of Belarus (1996–2000)

Sergei Ling
- Сяргей Лінг; Сергей Линг

3rd Prime Minister of Belarus
- In office 11 November 1996 – 18 February 2000
- President: Alexander Lukashenko
- Preceded by: Mikhail Chigir
- Succeeded by: Vladimir Yermoshin

Personal details
- Born: 7 May 1937 (age 89) Minsk, Belarusian SSR, Soviet Union (now Belarus)
- Education: Belarusian State Agricultural Academy

Sergei Stepanovich Ling (Note: Belarusian: Сяргей Сцяпанавіч Лінг, romanized: Siarhiej Sciapanavič Linh; Russian: Сергей Степанович Линг, romanized: Sergej Stepanovič Ling) (born 7 May 1937) is a Belarusian politician and agronomist. He was Prime Minister of Belarus from 1996 to 2000 and Permanent Representative of Belarus to the United Nations (2000–2002).

According to media reports, Ling's son-in-law is businessman Sergei Botyanovsky, who is associated with military enterprises and controls a Belarusian airline that operates business jets.
