= Minsk State Linguistic University =

Public university in Minsk, Belarus

Coordinates: 53°54′26″N 27°34′41″E

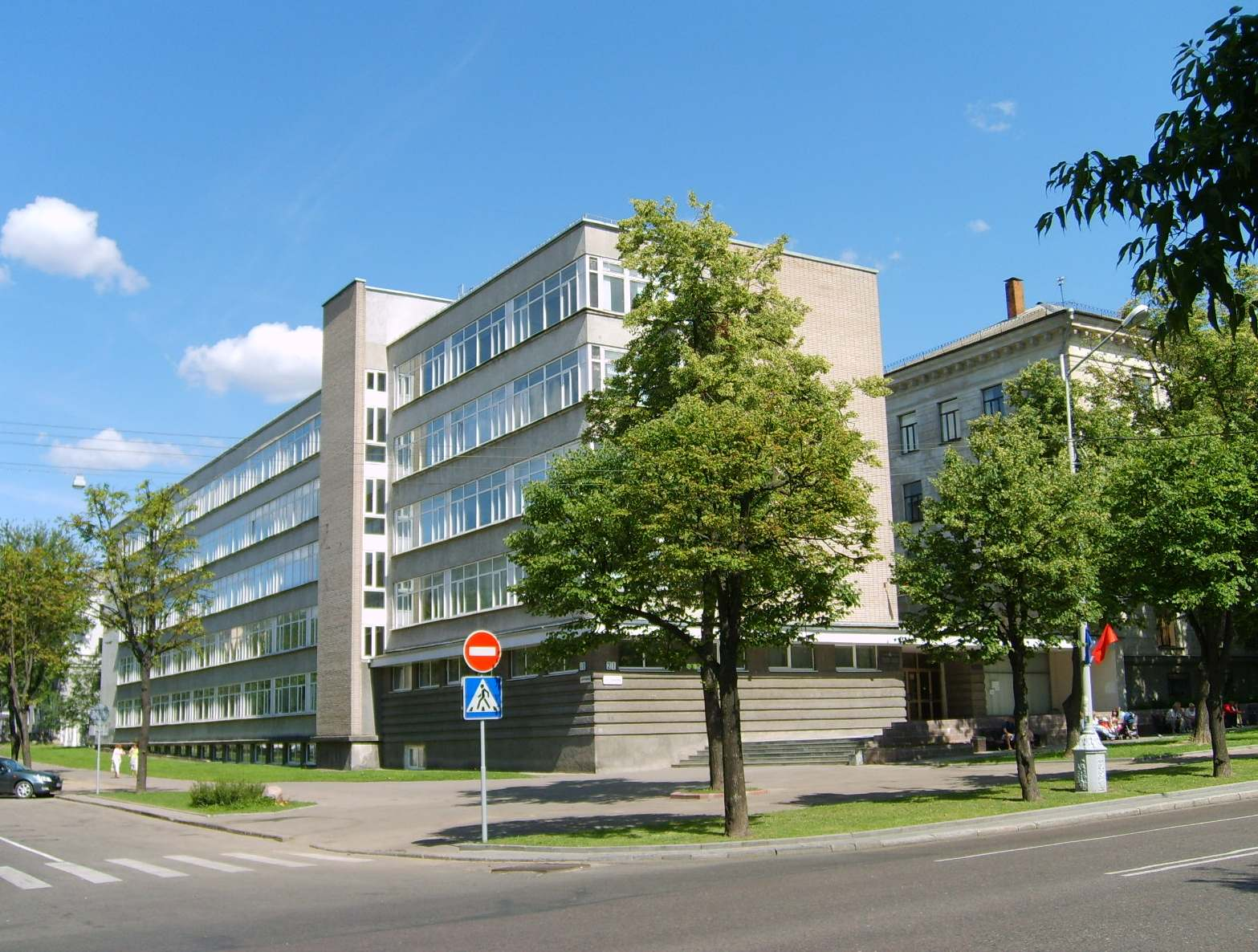
BSUFL(Then MSLU) in 2006

Belarusian State University of Foreign Languages (BSUFL; Formerly known as MSLU; Belarusian: Мінскі дзяржаўны лінгвістычны універсітэт, romanized: Minski dziaržaŭny linhvistyčny univiersitet, МДЛУ; БДУЗМ) is a public university in Minsk, Belarus. It specializes in language education and offers courses in 18 foreign languages including English, German, French, and Spanish. The university also trains teachers of Russian and Belarusian as foreign languages. It was founded in 1948 as Minsk State Pedagogical Institute for Foreign Languages and today is considered the flagship university in Belarus for language education and translator training.

In addition to degree programs and continuous education courses aimed at local students, BSUFL also offers both short courses and degree programs for foreign nationals, mainly focusing on the Russian language. The university maintains ties with institutions abroad, including exchange programs for students and faculty.

== Majors ==
BSUFL offers seven academic majors: general linguistics, interpreting and translation, foreign language teaching, communication services, public relations, international (political) relations, international (economic) relations. In addition, the university offers at least eighteen specializations, including world literature, international media, linguistic computing, critical analysis of fiction and non-fiction literature, international country studies, civilization studies, history of art, literary translation, technical translation, simultaneous interpreting, academic writing, psychology, philosophy, logic, Latin, communication technologies in business, and graphic design.

== Rectors of Minsk State Linguistic University (MSLU) ==
- 1948–1961 – Mikhail Fedotovich Zhavrid
- 1961–1970 – Frol Porfiryevich Shmygov
- 1970–1990 – Nina Georgievna Krasnova
- 1990–1995 – Vladimir Vasilievich Makarov
- 1995–2020 – Natalia Petrovna Baranova (née Golovataya) holds a Candidate of Pedagogical Sciences degree (equivalent to a Ph.D.) and the academic title of Associate Professor. She was born on June 23, 1950. In 1960, her family relocated to the city of Lida, where she graduated from Secondary School No. 1 in 1967. She received her higher education in 1974, graduating from the Minsk State Pedagogical Institute of Foreign Languages with a degree in English and German. For more than five years, Natalia Petrovna represented the Republic of Belarus on the Council of Europe’s Education Committee, where she contributed to the development of a project on modern foreign languages. From 1995 to 2020, she served as the Rector of Minsk State Linguistic University (MSLU). Under her leadership, MSLU became the first institution in Belarus to introduce an academic program in Intercultural Communication. She also spearheaded the establishment of the UNESCO Chair “Promoting Peace and Tolerance through Language Studies and Civic Education.” Since 2012, she has served as a member of the Council of the Republic (V Convocation). She works within the Inter-Parliamentary Union and is an active member of the Women Parliamentarians’ Committee. In the fall of 2015, she was awarded the honorary title “Minsk Citizen of the Year.”
- Since 2020 – Natalia Evgenyevna Lapteva

== Allegations of political repression against students ==
According to a report prepared by the Polish Foundation for Freedom and Democracy, Natalia Baranova, rector of the university, expelled students for their political activities.

=== Student protests in 2020 ===
During the 2020 Belarusian protests following what was widely perceived as a falsified presidential election, Minsk State Linguistic University became one of the epicenters of civic activism by students who protested against the Lukashenka regime. This was followed by students being arrested by the police and unidentified militia on the university premises, with the university administration not offering protection to its students and instead banning all protests on campus. Despite the administration's lack of support for the students, Alyaksandr Lukashenka personally replaced the university's rector in the aftermath. A number of academics employed by MSLU recorded a video address that condemned the university's response. This was followed by a backlash from the leadership: an associate professor who had worked at MSLU for 28 years was fired for supporting student protests and going on strike, followed by more faculty members who likewise supported the protesters.

The university leadership's actions were widely condemned internationally, with a report by International Media Support stating that "the event at Minsk State Linguistic University shows how students are threatened and repressed by their own institutions."

== Notable alumni ==
- Ernest Sabiła, Belarusian Protestant religious leader.
- Michaił Chvastoŭ, former Minister for Foreign Affairs of Belarus and former Ambassador of Belarus in the United States and Mexico.
- Lavon Barščeŭski, Belarusian philologist and opposition politician.
- Anastasija Vińnikava, Belarusian singer and Belarusian representative at Eurovision Song Contest 2011.
- Jarasłaŭ Ramančuk, Belarusian economist and politician, candidate for president of Belarus in the 2010 elections.
- Oleg Vadimovich Savchenko (better known as LSP), Belarusian singer-songwriter.
