= Nikolai Gusarov =

Russian communist activist

- Никола́й Ива́нович Гуса́ров
- Born: August 16, 1905; Nikolayevskaya sloboda, Astrakhan Governorate, Russian Empire
- Died: March 17, 1985 (aged 79); Moscow, RFSFR, Soviet Union
- Occupation: Political commissar
- Political party: CPB
- Other political affiliations: CPSU
- Awards: Order of Lenin; Order of the Red Banner of Labour; Order of the Badge of Honour

Nikolai Ivanovich Gusarov (Russian: Никола́й Ива́нович Гуса́ров, Belarusian: Мікала́й Іва́навіч Гуса́раў; 16 August 1905 – 17 March 1985) was the first secretary of the Communist Party of Byelorussia from 7 March 1947 until 3 June 1950.
