= Ivan Bylinsky =

Soviet politician (1903–1976)

Ivan Semyonovich Bylinsky (Belarusian: Іва́н Сямё́навіч Былі́нскі, Russian: Ива́н Семёнович Были́нский; 28 January 1903 in Gomel District – 10 May 1976) was a Belarusian communist politician. He served as the Chairman of the Council of Ministers of the Byelorussian Soviet Socialist Republic from 28 June 1940 to 6 February 1944. From 1944 until 1946, he served as the member of the Communist Party of Byelorussia.
