= Afanasy Kovalyov =

Soviet bureaucrat (1903–1993)

Afanasy Feodorovich Kovalyov (Belarusian: Апанас Фёдаравіч Кавалёў, romanized: Apanas Fiodaravič Kavalioŭ, 15 December 1903 – 20 July 1993) was a Soviet bureaucrat who was Chairman of the Council of People's Commissars of the Byelorussian Soviet Socialist Republic from 10 September 1937 to 28 July 1938 and deputy of the Supreme Soviet of the 1st convocation.
