= Cherkasy =

City in Ukraine

Cherkasy Черкаси
- City
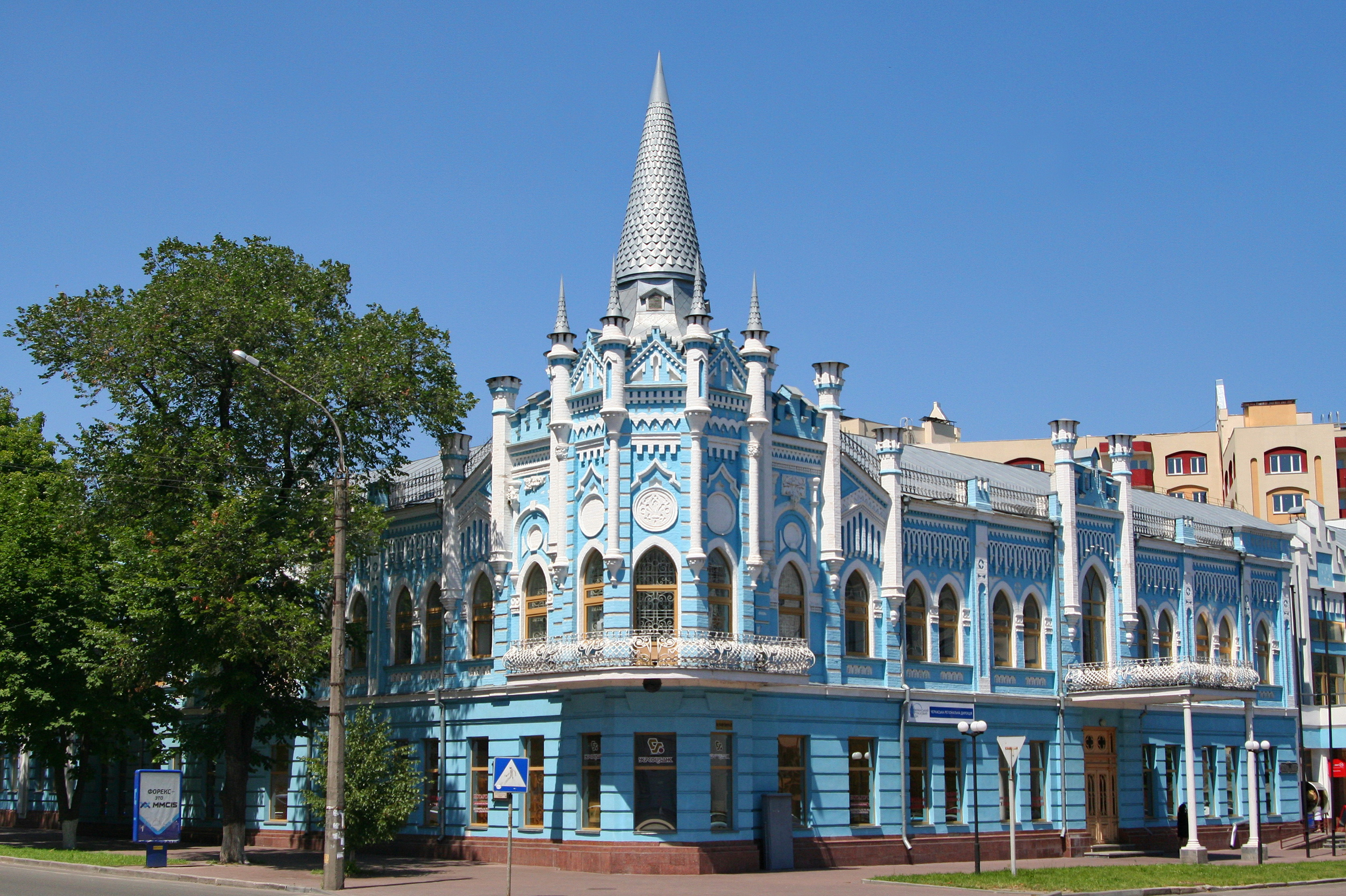
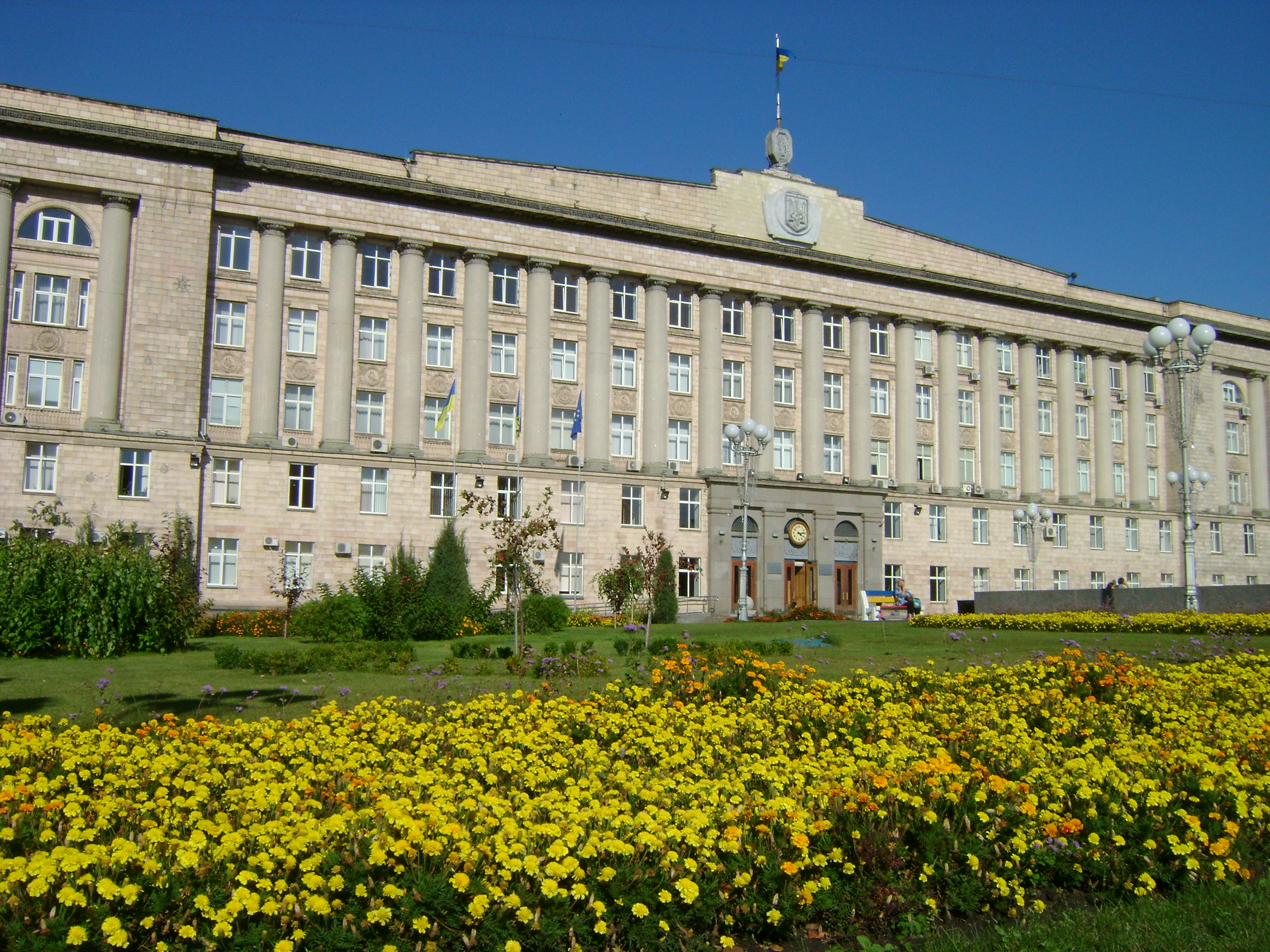
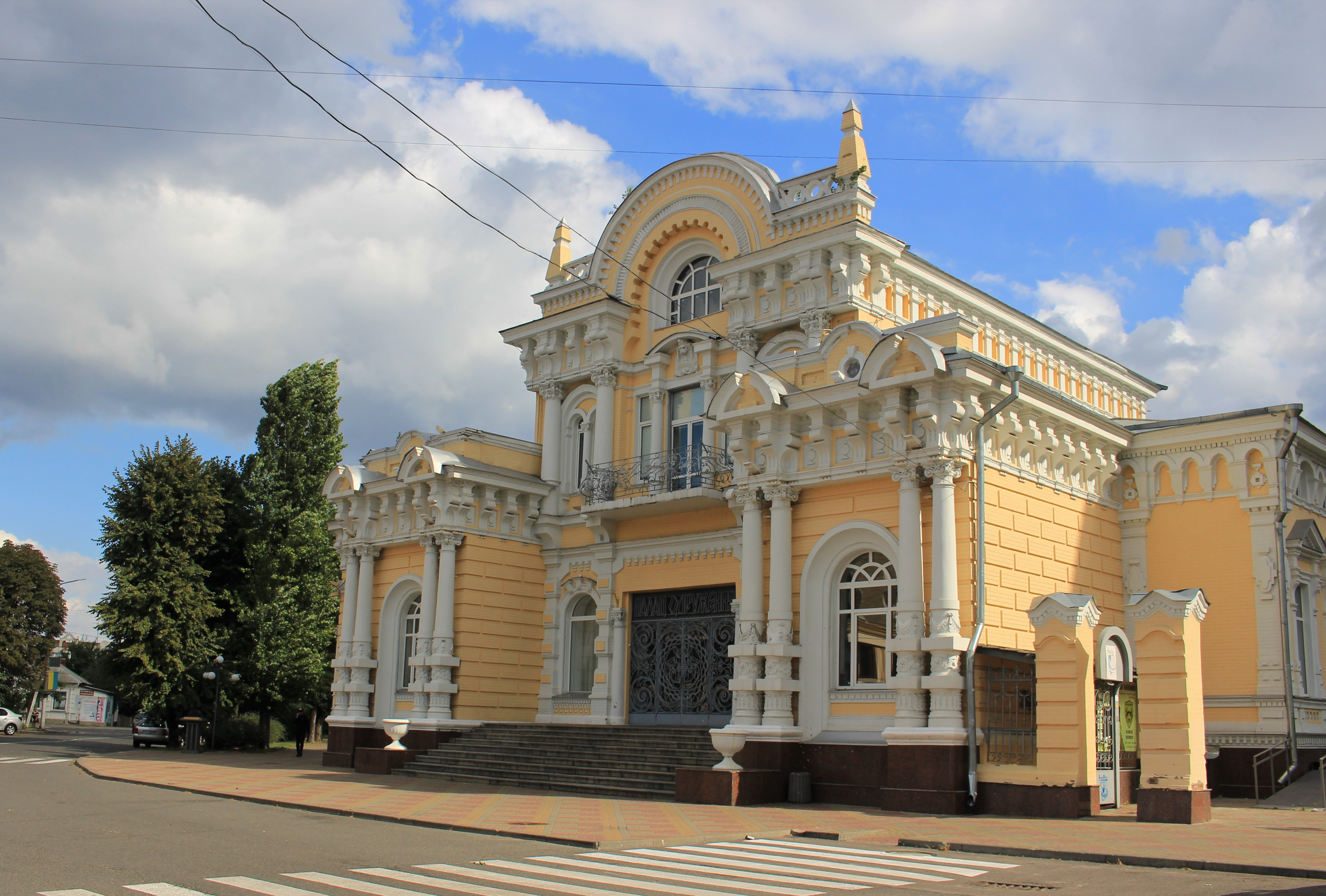
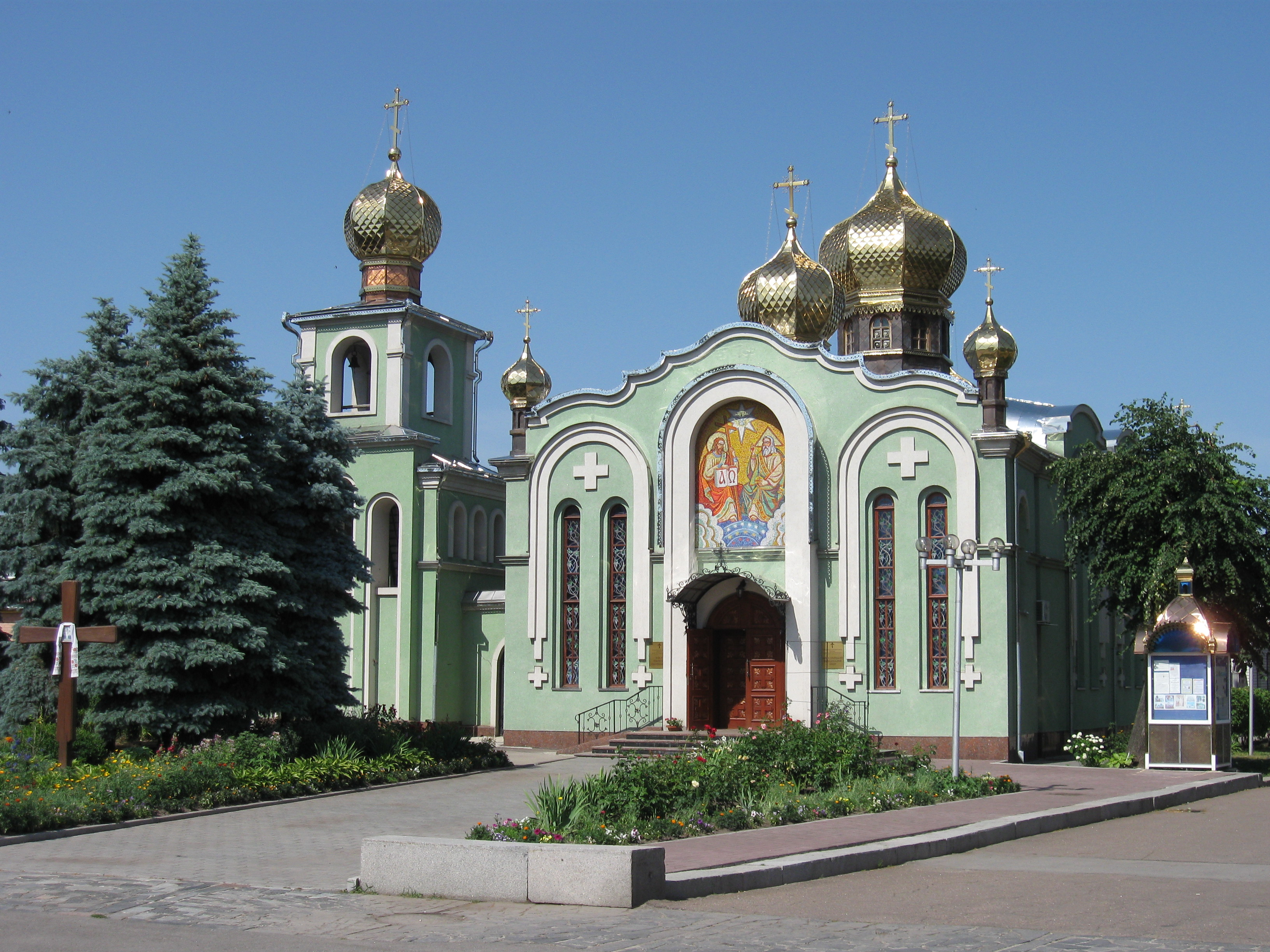
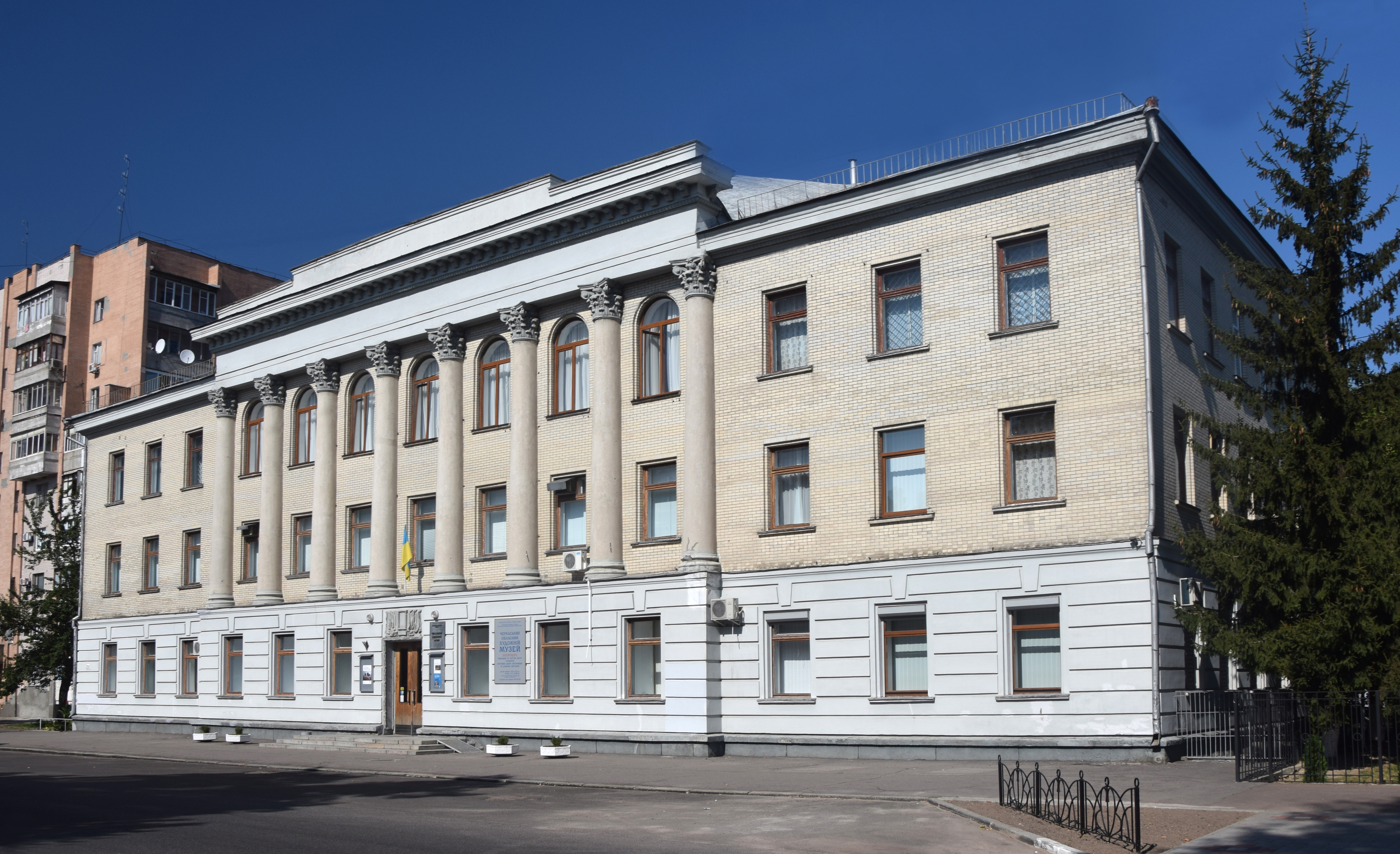
- Slovianskyi Hotel Regional administration Wedding Palace Holy Trinity Cathedral Art Museum

- Flag Coat of arms
- Interactive map of Cherkasy
- Location of Cherkasy Cherkasy (Ukraine)
- Coordinates: 49°26′40″N 32°03′35″E
- Country: Ukraine
- Oblast: Cherkasy Oblast
- Raion: Cherkasy Raion
- Hromada: Cherkasy urban hromada
- First mentioned: 1286
- City status: 1795

Government
  - Mayor: Anatoliy Vasyliovych Bondarenko (For the Future)

Area
  - Land: 69 km^{2} (27 sq mi)
- Elevation: 110 m (360 ft)

Population (2022)
  - Total: 269,836
  - Density: 3,900/km^{2} (10,000/sq mi)
- Time zone: UTC+2 (EET)
  - Summer (DST): UTC+3 (EEST)
- Postal code: 18000 – 18499
- Area code: +380 472
- Licence plate: CA, IA
- Sister cities: Bydgoszcz, Sumgait, Santa Rosa
- Website: chmr.gov.ua/

Cherkasy (Ukrainian: Черкаси, pronounced [tʃerˈkɑsɪ]) is a city in central Ukraine. Cherkasy serves as the administrative centre of Cherkasy Oblast as well as Cherkasy Raion within the oblast. The city has a population of 269,836 (2022 estimate).

Cherkasy is the cultural, educational and industrial centre of Cherkasy Oblast and Ukraine's Central Economic Region. Known since the 13th century, Cherkasy has played a great role in the history of Ukraine. The city was the centre of the land of the Cossacks; its citizens took part in the Khmelnychchyna and Koliivshchyna Cossack and peasant rebellions.

The city is located on the right bank of Dnieper River, about 200 km (124 mi) south of the nation's capital, Kyiv. In June 2011, the city celebrated its 725th anniversary.

== Etymology ==
According to V. N. Tatishchev and A. I. Rigelman, the city's name comes from the Circassians. According to Tatishchev, Circassians formed the "Pyatigorsk Banners" of the Polish-Lithuanian Commonwealth, received lands, and merged into the Polish nobility. The peasants who imitated their masters, nobles of Circassian origin, and wore Caucasian clothing (cherkeskas), came to be called Cherkasy. Subsequently, when Stephen Báthory settled "Muscovites," "Wallachians", and "those of our subjects whom We (former kings of the Commonwealth) intended to execute" as registered Cossacks around the city of Cherkasy, these Cossacks became known as Cherkasy based on the name of the city and the Cherkasy Regiment. The city is mentioned by Evliya Çelebi. According to him, the Cherkasy fortress was founded by a man named "Cherkes" ("Circassian") who escaped from the Tatars. Therefore, the fortress was named Cherkes-kerman.

According to Max Vasmer’s etymological dictionary of the Russian language, the city's name does not necessarily originate from Circassian settlements. The city might have been named after local Russians who first reached the "Circassian Mountains" (the Caucasus). According to the geographical concepts of that time, these mountains began near the outskirts of modern Novocherkassk and included both the Greater and Lesser Caucasus (Transcaucasia). G. V. Vernadsky suggested that a settlement with the same name existed at this location as early as the 11th century, long before the city of Cherkasy appeared in chronicles. At that time, there was an actual migration from the Caucasus to the territories surrounding the current city. The settlement was called Cherkasy from Chahar Kaz—"four Kaz clans." However, modern research has shown that the Cossacks did not have Circassian names, as Vernadsky thought, but Armenian names. A. P. Znoyko derives the name from Turkic roots. He asserts that the toponym Cherkasy comes from the phrase chiri kishi, meaning "people of strength" or "people of the army."

== History ==
=== Early history ===
The history of Cherkasy has not been thoroughly explored. Historians believe that the city was established in 1286, within the territory of Kievan Rus'. Little is known about the early history of the city. Cherkasy is first documented in the 1305 Hustyn Chronicle, in which it is mentioned along with other Kievan Rus' cities such as Kyiv, Kaniv, Zhytomyr and Ovruch.

=== Lithuanian rule ===
In the 1360s the city entered a new period in its development, becoming a part of the Grand Duchy of Lithuania. Cherkasy became an important defender of the southern borders of the Grand Duchy. In 1384 the city was recognized as a fortified town on the southern edge (of the Grand Duchy of Lithuania), forming along with Vinnytsia, Bratslav and Kaniv part of a defensive line against Crimean Tatars. The city started to be ruled by a starost. It also became the seat of the Ukrainian Cossack Hetman. Since the 15th century it was one of the chief cities of Ukraine (modern central Ukraine).

From the end of the 15th until the beginning of the 16th centuries, the post of Cherkasy starost was held by the prominent persons of that time – Bogdan Glinskiy (in office: 1488–1495), Kmyta Oleksandrovych (in office: 1494–1500), Vasyl Dashkevych (in office: 1504–1507), Andriy Nemyrovych (in office: 1511–1514), Ostafiy Dashkevych (in office: 1514–1535), Vasyl Tyshkevych, Dmytro Vyshnevetsky (in office: 1550–1553) etc.

During the 15th and 16th centuries Cherkasy was one of the main centres that helped the Cossacks in the peopling of the Ukrainian south. Citizens took part in military campaigns against Tatars and Turks, including operations led by Ivan Pidkova (died 1578). In 1523, the city was unsuccessfully besieged by the Crimean Tatars. New Cherkasy Castle, built in 1549–52 on the place of the old one, was the centre of city life. In 1560, Prince Michał Wiśniowiecki was appointed starost of Cherkasy.

=== Polish rule ===
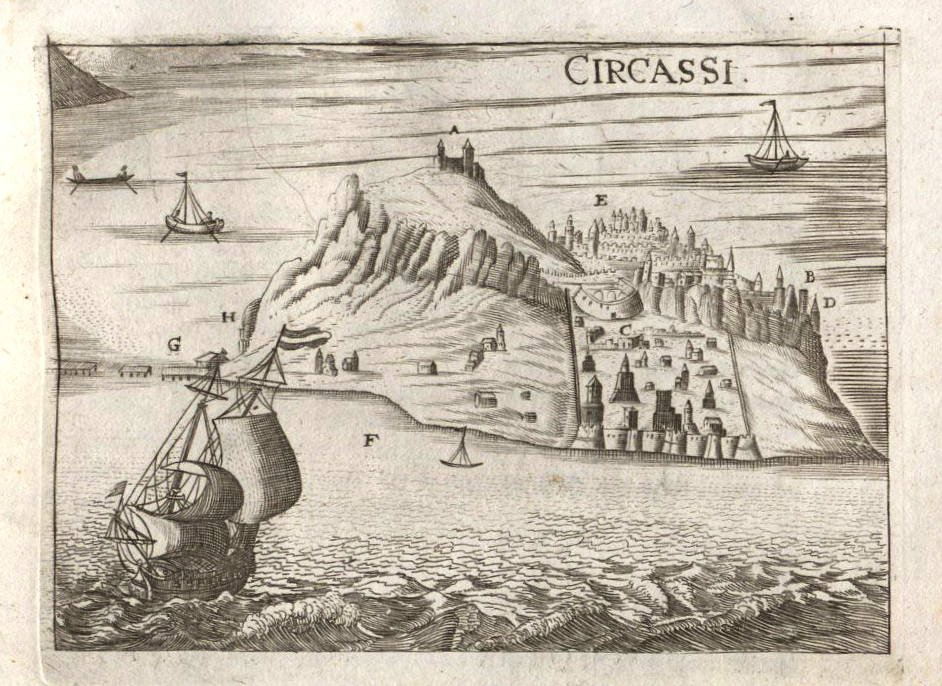
Depiction of Cherkasy from a book from 1700

After the Union of Lublin in 1569 Cherkasy became a part of Poland. Local starost Michał Wiśniowiecki, enjoying the favor of the King of Poland, obtained from him the right to pardon any local Cossack who had defected to Muscovite service for profit. There was a dispute between the castle captains and starost Michał Wiśniowiecki over the operation of taverns and inns, as a result of which, in 1571, the starost brought a complaint against the captains to the King of Poland. In 1580, an envoy of King Stephen Báthory arrived in the city to resolve a conflict between the city's residents and the Zaporozhian Cossacks.

The Cherkasy Regiment, which was created in 1625, played a big role in history of the city. The city became one of the centres of the Cossack movement. Citizens took part in the Khmelnytsky Uprising of 1648-1657, during which the regiment became an administrative-territorial subdivision (until 1686). During that time Cherkasy Regiment was one of the most powerful military units and took part in all of the battles with Bohdan Khmelnytsky's army. After a successful campaign, Khmelnytsky in 1654 signed an alliance with Muscovy at Pereiaslav. The war ended in 1667 with the Truce of Andrusovo. Cherkasy remained part of Poland, but territories east of the Dnieper River including left-bank Ukraine and Zaporizhzhia were secured for Muscovy.

While in the Polish Kingdom, the city was a seat of the county (powiat) which belonged to a greater unit – the Kyiv Voivodeship of the Lesser Poland Province until 1793. It was a royal city of Poland. In 1768, during the Koliiivshchyna turmoils, in which the city's residents participated, Cherkasy was severely damaged and pillaged. In 1791 the city gained Magdeburg rights. After the Second Partition of Poland, in 1793, the city was annexed by the Russian Empire.

=== 19th – early 20th centuries ===
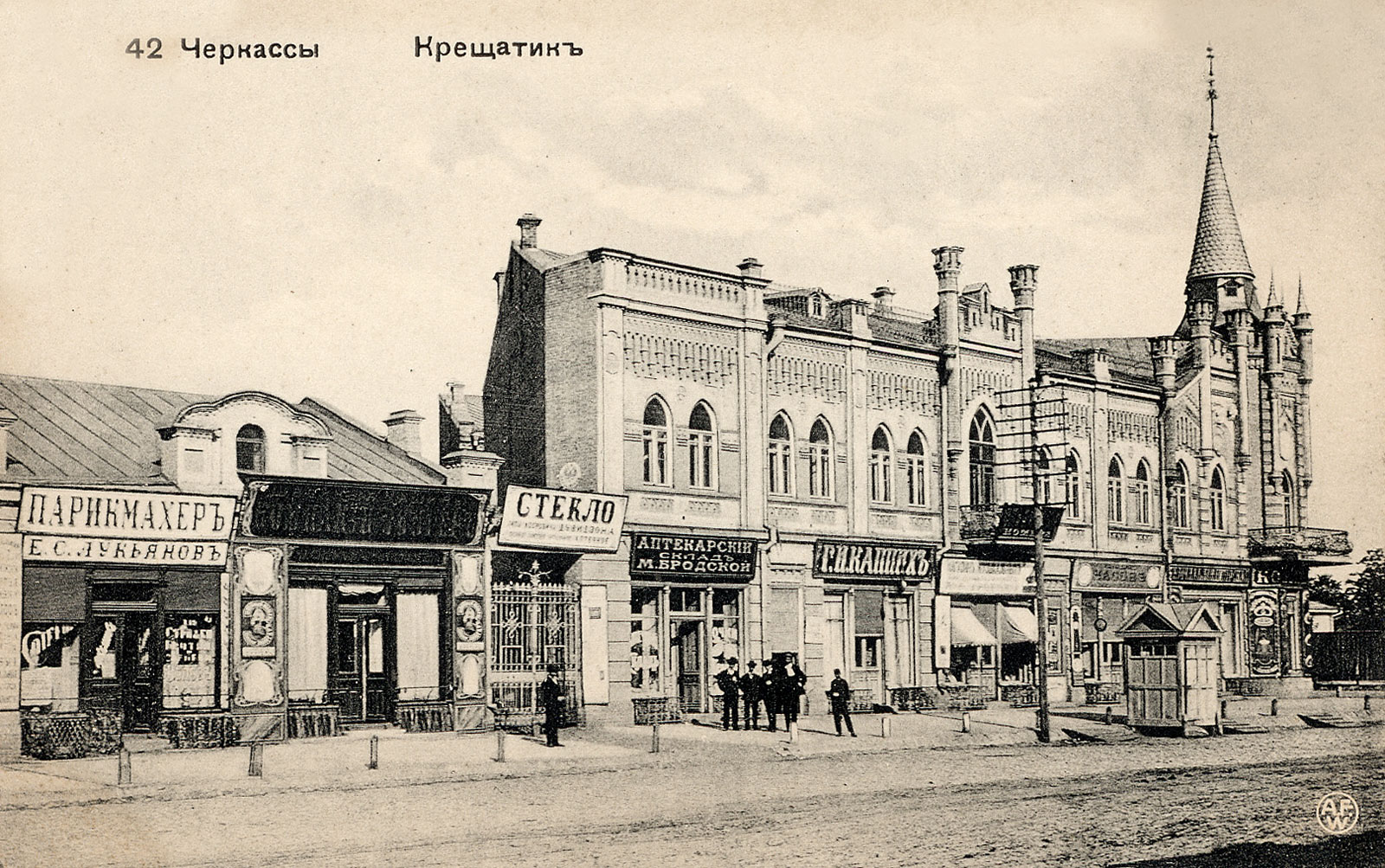
Khreshchatyk Street in c. 1910

From the beginning of the 19th century, the city was planned by William Heste, a Russian architect, civil engineer and town planner of Scottish descent. His plan for the city involved building square blocks with straight streets. In 1797, it became the seat of the newly established Cherkassy uezd in the Kyiv Governorate. In 1799, it was merged with the Chigirin uezd, and then reinstated in 1800. By the 1870s, the city had a sugar refinery and 56 tanneries. In the second half of the 19th century the city experienced great economic growth. The construction of a railroad through the city resulted in many new industrial enterprises. Sugar, tobacco, metalwork, mechanical engineering and trade industries were at peak development at that time.

=== Ukrainian War of Independence ===
After the October Revolution in 1917 Cherkasy fell under Bolshevik control. After that, however, the city changed its ruler at least 18 times – during the Ukrainian War of Independence it was conquered by hetman Pavlo Skoropadskyi, then again by Bolsheviks, later by Nykyfor Hryhoriv.

On 6 March 1918, Cherkasy became the seat of Cherkasy land, a zemlia of the Ukrainian People's Republic, which was disbanded on 29 April 1918 by Hetman of Ukraine Pavlo Skoropadsky, who brought back old governorate divisions of the Russian Empire.

On 1 January 1920, the city eventually fell under Soviet rule. Afterwards it was administratively part of the Kremenchuk Governorate of Ukraine, and after its dissolution of the Kyiv Governorate of Ukraine.

=== Soviet rule ===
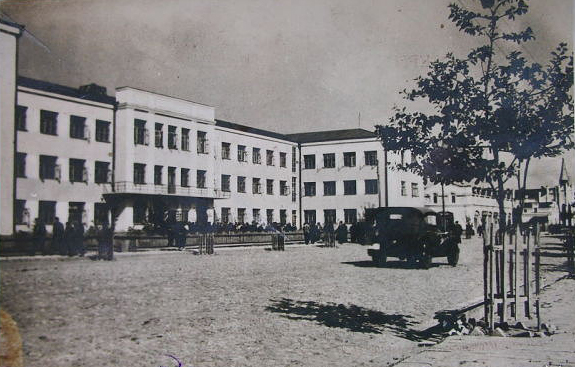
Cherkasy in 1930

As with all villages and towns in the area, it was a victim of man-made famine in 1932–1933 (Holodomor) and a Great Purge (a series of campaigns of political repression and persecution in the Soviet Union organised by Joseph Stalin in 1936–1938).

=== Second World War period ===
The Second World War damaged the city greatly. On 22 June 1941, German bombers attacked Cherkasy. For two months soldiers defended the city, but on 22 August, the invaders took the city. On 14 December 1943, Cherkasy was liberated from the German invaders. After the end of the war, the city began to recover after being almost obliterated. According to 5-year plans, the city began to re-develop its economy, infrastructure and socio-cultural sphere.

=== post Second World War period ===
In 1954 the city became the administrative centre of Cherkasy Oblast (province), which remains the youngest oblast in Ukraine to date. In the 1960s Cherkasy became the chemical giant of the Ukrainian SSR, after "Azot" (the biggest nitrogen fertilizer producing plant), "Khimvolokno" (artificial fiber manufacturing plant), "Khimreaktyv" (chemical reagents for military purposes) and many others were built in the city. In 1961 a Kremenchuk hydro power plant was built, forming the Kremenchuk Water Reservoir, which Cherkasy is now standing on. This makes the city a big transport hub, serving the longest dyke in Ukraine (15 km) with rail and road on it.

=== Independence from the Soviet Union ===
Since gaining independence, industry in the city has declined, along with the number of citizens and living standards. A lot of big and powerful factories and plants were privatized but couldn't survive in a competitive market. Some enterprises changed their profile – several (3) factories and plants around the city were united under the "Bogdan Corporation" and started production of buses and cars. Some of the companies remained working and became successful, like "Azot". On 28 November 2008, the monument of Lenin was removed from the central square. This caused different reactions in different people. Now the central square, formerly called "Lenin Square", is called "Soborna Square" (Cathedral Square). The square was recently renovated. In 2009, Cherkasy airport received International Airport status (IATA: CKC – ICAO: UKKE).

Until 18 July 2020, Cherkasy was designated as a city of oblast significance and belonged to Cherkasy Municipality but not to Cherkasy Raion even though it was the centre of the raion. As part of the administrative reform of Ukraine, which reduced the number of raions of Cherkasy Oblast to four, the city was merged into Cherkasy Raion.

The city has occasionally seen Russian air strikes and missile attacks as a result of the Russian invasion of Ukraine.

== Geography ==
=== Location ===
Cherkasy is situated on the high right bank of the Dnipro River, in the middle of the Kremenchuk Reservoir. Relief of the historical part of the city was influenced by Zamkova (Castle) Mountain, where Cherkasy Castle was situated. The major part of Cherkasy occurs as lowlands.

The city occupies an area of 69 km^{2} (26.6 sq mi). The city's length is 17 km (10.56 mi) along the Kremenchuk Reservoir, while its widest point is only 8 km (4.97 mi).

From the north-west, Cherkasy is surrounded by forest. Known as Cherkasy Forest, it is the biggest (28,500 hectares or 70,400 acres) natural pine forest in Ukraine.

Cherkasy is divided into 2 urban districts: Prydniprovskyi District and Sosnivskyi District, which includes the village of Orshanets. It hosts the administration of Cherkasy urban hromada, one of the hromadas of Ukraine.

=== Climate ===
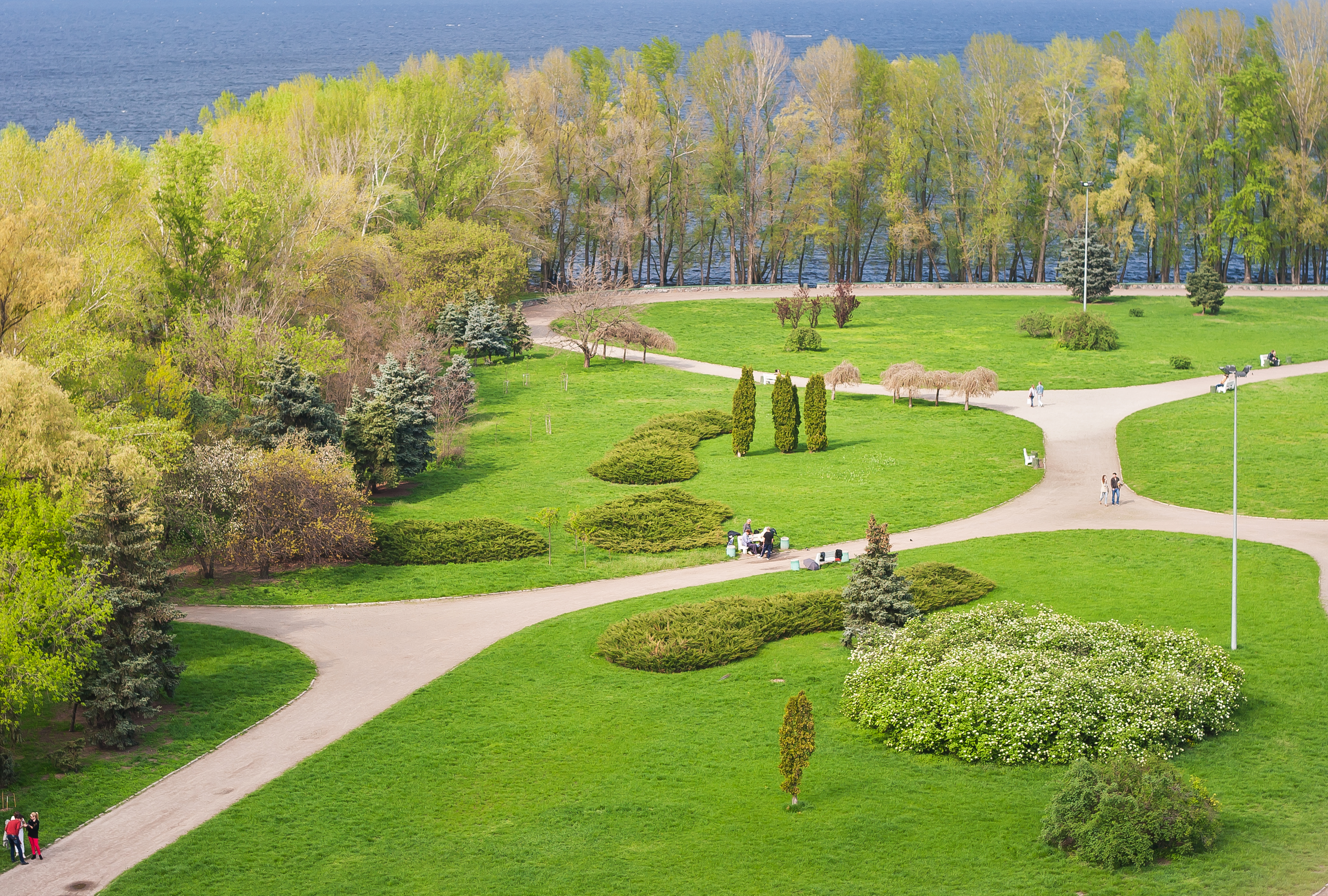
View from Hill of Glory on the Rose Valley and water reservoir.

The climate of Cherkasy is mild continental, with mild winters and warm summers.

The average temperature in the city is +7.7 °C (45.9 °F). Winters are usually cold and snowy (the average January temperature is −5.9 °C (21.4 °F)). Summers are dry and warm (the average temperature in July is +19.8 °C (67.6 °F)), with occasional highs reaching +35 °C (95 °F).

Climate data for Cherkasy (1981–2010)
Month	Jan	Feb	Mar	Apr	May	Jun	Jul	Aug	Sep	Oct	Nov	Dec	Year
Mean daily maximum °C (°F)	−1.0 (30.2)	−0.1 (31.8)	5.6 (42.1)	14.4 (57.9)	21.4 (70.5)	24.3 (75.7)	26.6 (79.9)	26.1 (79.0)	20.0 (68.0)	13.1 (55.6)	5.0 (41.0)	0.2 (32.4)	13.0 (55.4)
Daily mean °C (°F)	−3.9 (25.0)	−3.5 (25.7)	1.4 (34.5)	9.0 (48.2)	15.4 (59.7)	18.7 (65.7)	20.6 (69.1)	19.7 (67.5)	14.3 (57.7)	8.2 (46.8)	1.9 (35.4)	−2.4 (27.7)	8.3 (46.9)
Mean daily minimum °C (°F)	−7.1 (19.2)	−6.8 (19.8)	−2.6 (27.3)	3.7 (38.7)	9.0 (48.2)	12.8 (55.0)	14.5 (58.1)	13.5 (56.3)	8.9 (48.0)	3.7 (38.7)	−0.9 (30.4)	−5.2 (22.6)	3.6 (38.5)
Average precipitation mm (inches)	30.0 (1.18)	29.9 (1.18)	35.2 (1.39)	34.7 (1.37)	48.5 (1.91)	72.5 (2.85)	63.2 (2.49)	55.8 (2.20)	54.5 (2.15)	42.6 (1.68)	40.5 (1.59)	36.2 (1.43)	543.6 (21.40)
Average snowfall cm (inches)	14.7 (5.8)	11.1 (4.4)	5.5 (2.2)	0.0 (0.0)	0.0 (0.0)	0.0 (0.0)	0.0 (0.0)	0.0 (0.0)	0.0 (0.0)	0.0 (0.0)	2.2 (0.9)	15.0 (5.9)	48.5 (19.2)
Average precipitation days (≥ 1.0 mm)	6.8	6.6	7.4	6.8	7.1	8.6	7.5	5.8	7.1	6.0	6.5	7.1	83.3
Average relative humidity (%)	84.1	81.8	77.0	68.1	64.0	69.6	69.6	68.2	73.6	78.8	85.0	85.7	75.5
Mean daily daylight hours	8.7	10.2	11.9	13.8	15.4	16.2	15.8	14.4	12.6	10.8	9.1	8.3	12.3
Average ultraviolet index	1	1	2	4	5	5	6	5	3	2	1	1	3
Source 1: NCEI
Source 2: World Weather Online(Snow-UV 2009-2023) Weather Atlas(Daylight)

=== Ecology ===
The ecological situation in the city is quite stable. The cumulative pollution index as of 2008 is 7.56, which is average relative to other Ukrainian cities. The main pollutant in the city is "Azot" plant, so the areas near it in the southeastern part of the city are the most polluted. The downtown area is heavily polluted as well, due to high traffic volume. The city itself is mostly clean of nuclear pollution from the Chernobyl disaster, although the northernmost part of Cherkasy may have been influenced a little.

== Demographics ==
Historical population
Year	Pop.	±%
1897	29,600	—
1926	38,563	+30.3%
1939	51,723	+34.1%
1959	84,822	+64.0%
1970	158,393	+86.7%
1979	228,197	+44.1%
1989	290,340	+27.2%
2001	295,414	+1.7%
2011	286,987	−2.9%
2022	269,836	−6.0%

As of 1 October 2015, the number of inhabitants of Cherkasy was 284,479. This number is decreasing because of rising mortality rate, the socio-economic situation, and suburbanisation in the region.

According to the 2001 census, Ukrainians made up 83.31% of the population, Russians 13.14% and Jews 0.55%. 46.4% are males, 53.6% are females. According to the data provided by the municipal health care department, teens under 14 encompass 15% of the population while pensioners are 19%, which indicates the prevalence of aging citizens compared to younger citizens.

=== Language ===
Distribution of the population by native language according to the 2001 census:

Language	Number	Percentage
Ukrainian	231 441	79.05%
Russian	54 677	18.68%
Other^{[a]}	6 643	2.27%
Total	292 761	100.00%

^{a} Those who did not indicate their native language or indicated a language that was native to less than 1% of the local population.

According to a survey conducted by the International Republican Institute in April–May 2023, 80% of the city's population spoke Ukrainian at home, and 18% spoke Russian.

== Transportation and transportation infrastructure ==
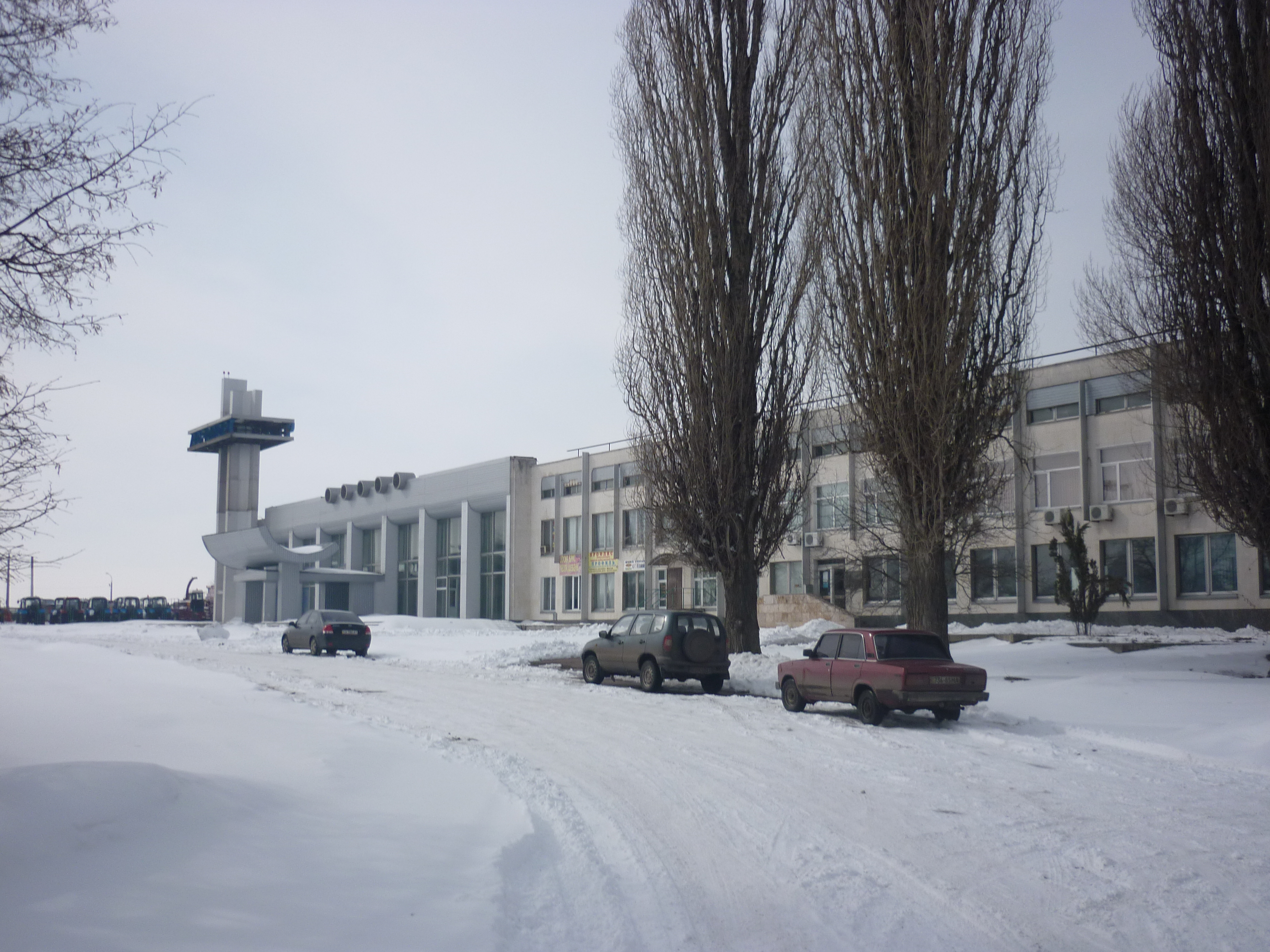
Cherkasy International Airport

=== Public transportation ===
Public transportation in Cherkasy consists of trolleybuses and buses. Trolleybuses started serving the city in 1965 and now operate on 10 routes, from approximately 6 am to 11 pm. The fleet is old, and mostly consists of ZiU-9 and ZiU-10 vehicles. Recently, 3 new trolleybuses (manufactured by LAZ) appeared in the city. The bus fleet mostly consists of "Etalon", "Bohdan", and "PAZ" buses. Cherkasy City Bus is the authority that controls the buses in the city. It consists of several private contractors which actually operate the transport system.

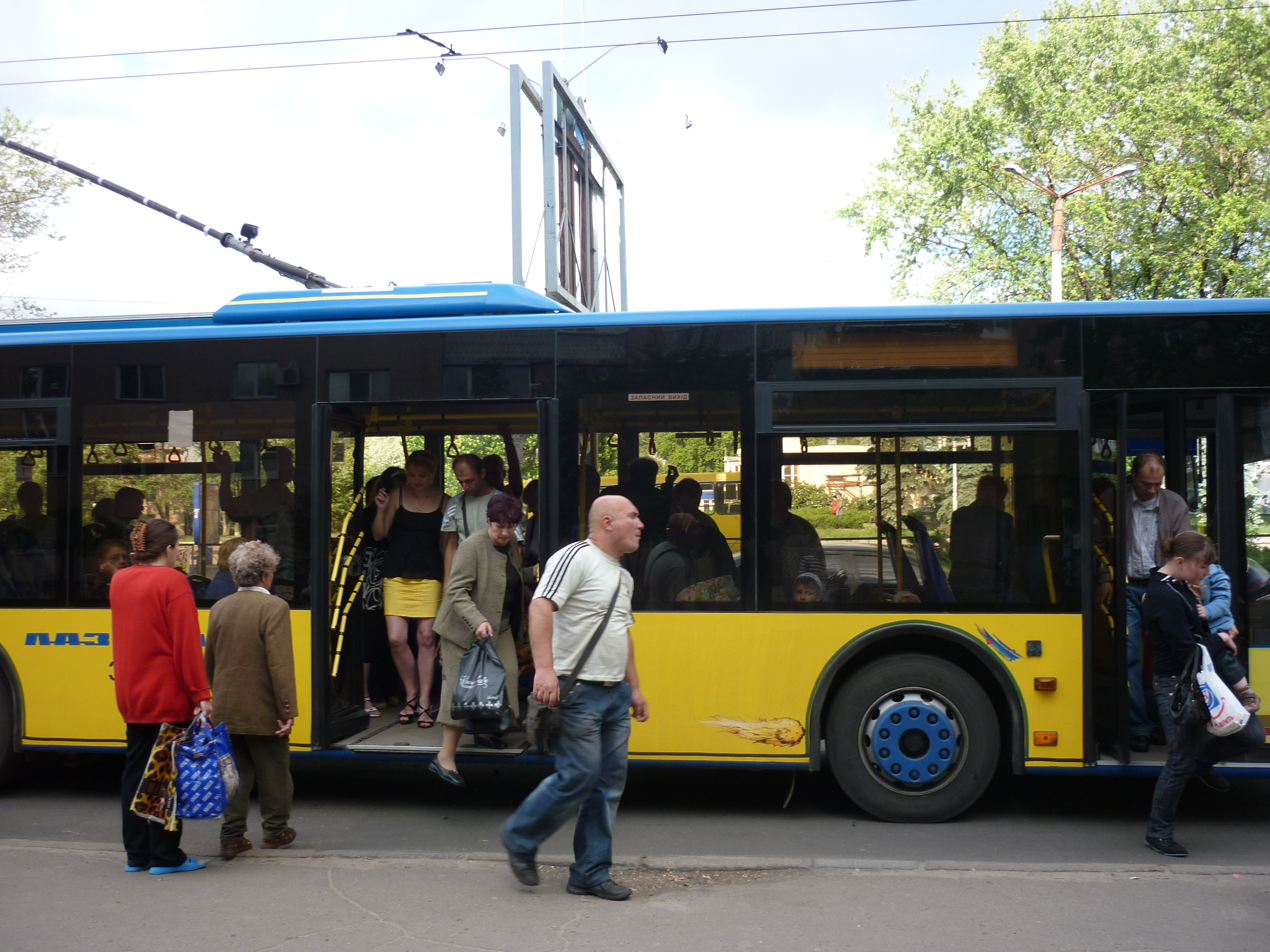
Cherkasy trolleybus LAZ E183

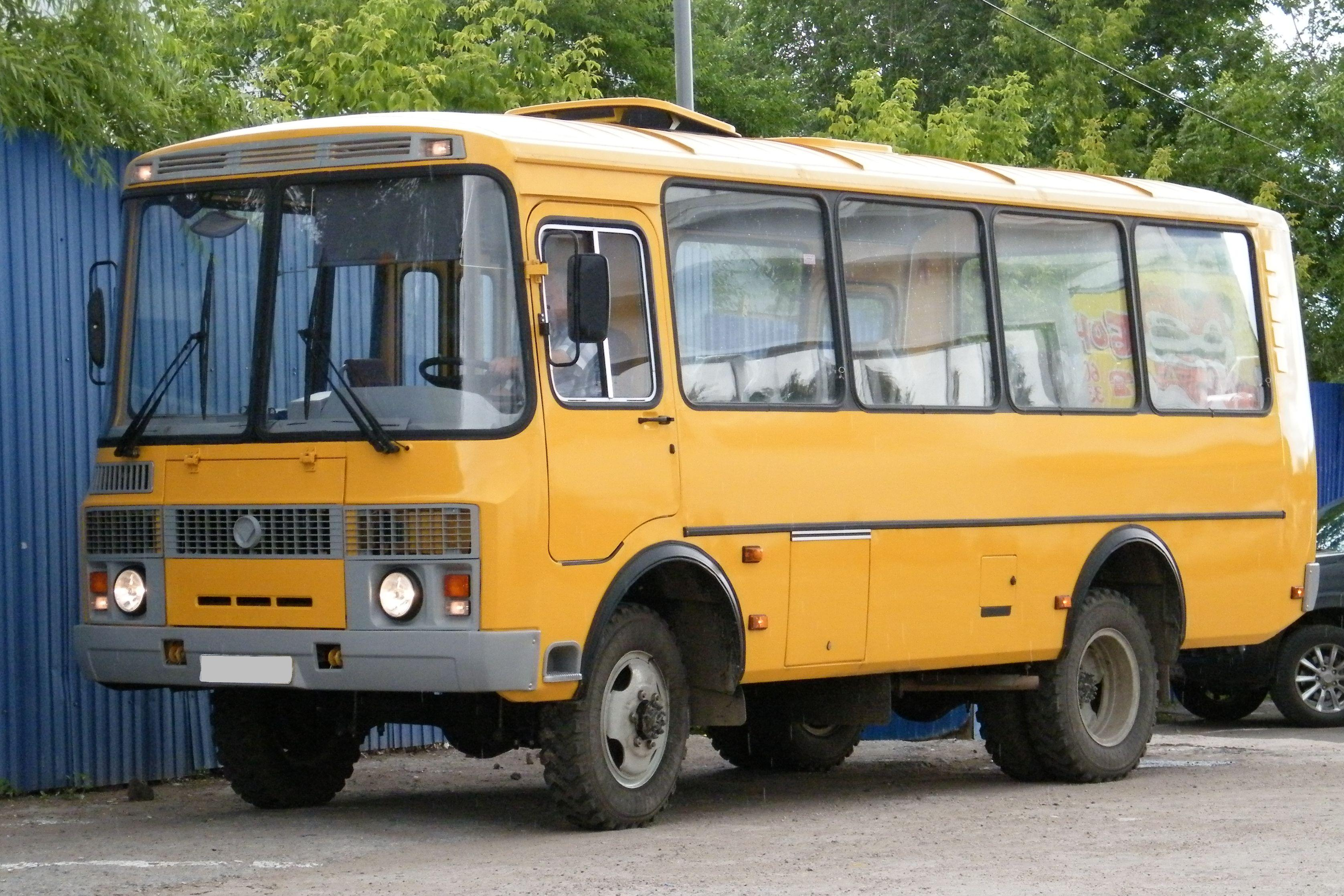
PAZ-3206

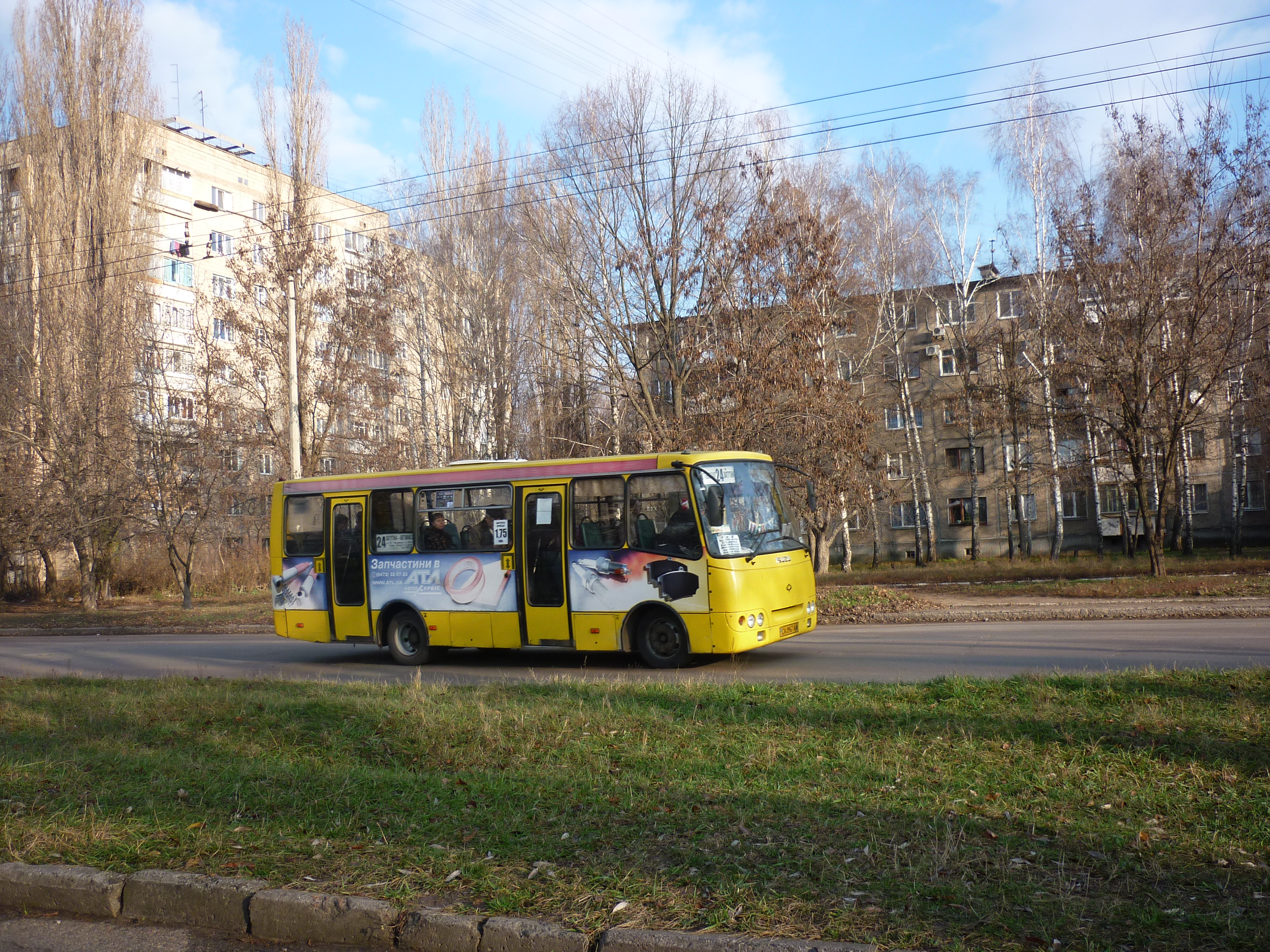
Cherkasy-made "Bohdan" bus in the street

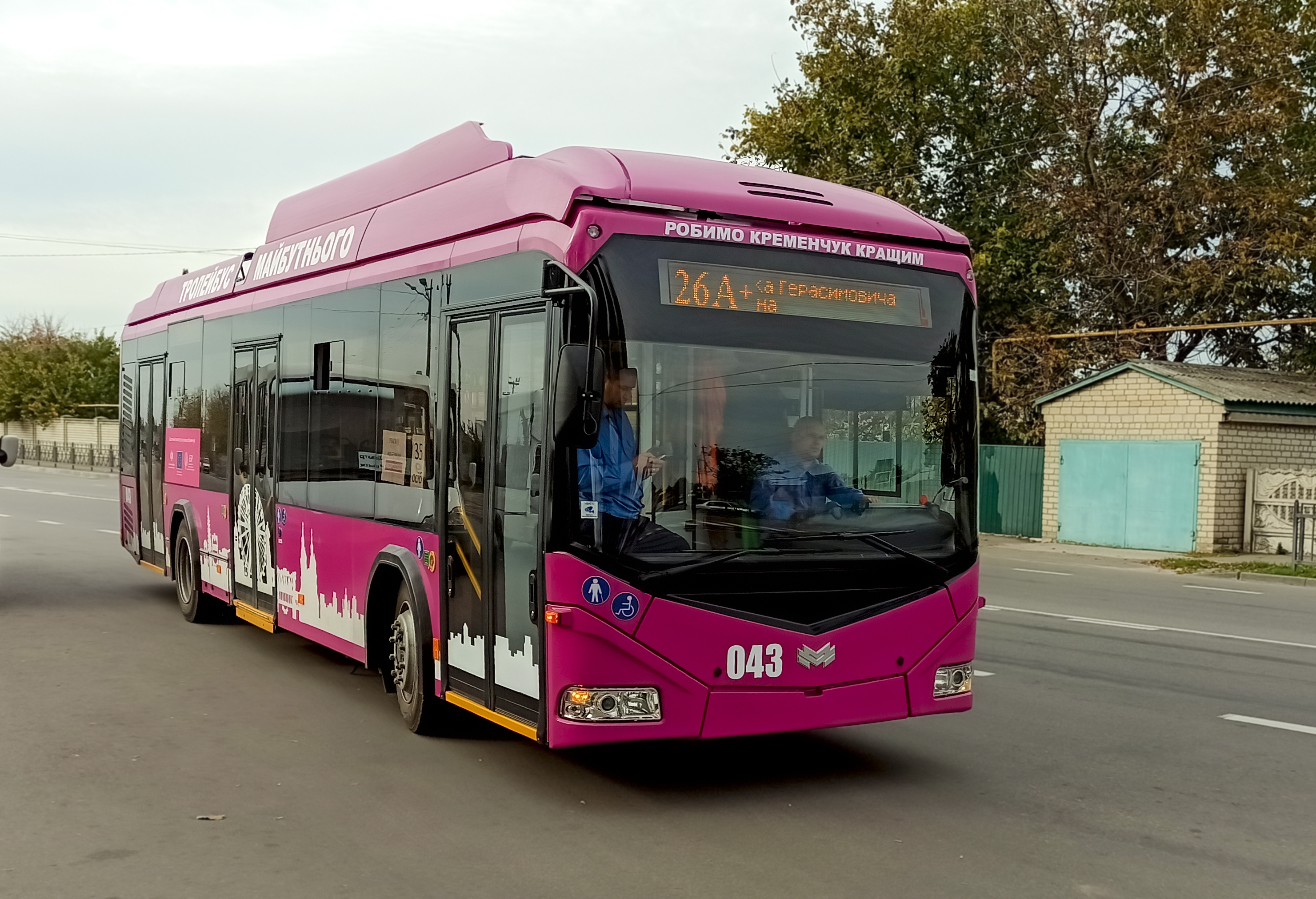
Cherkasy trolleybus ACSM-321

=== Roads ===
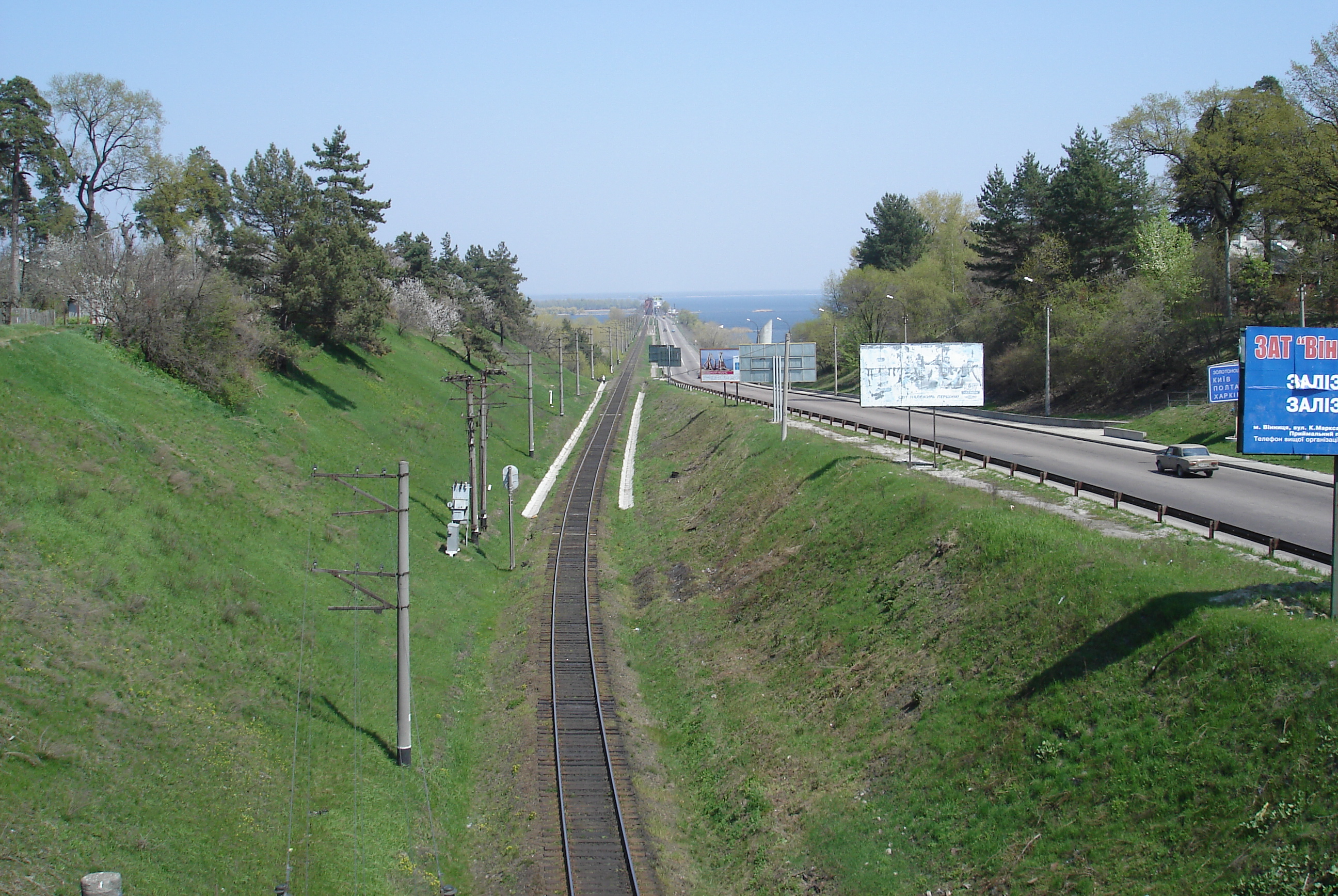
View of a bridge its rail and vehicular parts (H16) from the P10 route overpass

Cherkasy is a major transport hub due to its location in the centre of the country. Two major automobile routes go through the city – H16 (Uman-Zolotonosha, national route, which crosses Dnieper (east-west)) and P10 (Kaniv-Kremenchuk, regional route, which travels along Dnieper, (north-south)). Over Dnieper, there is a river crossing that combines both a dam and a combination bridge consisting of two, one vehicular and another rail.

To the west, there is a 4-lane highway between Cherkasy and Smila, which is part of the Cherkasy urban agglomeration.

=== Railways ===
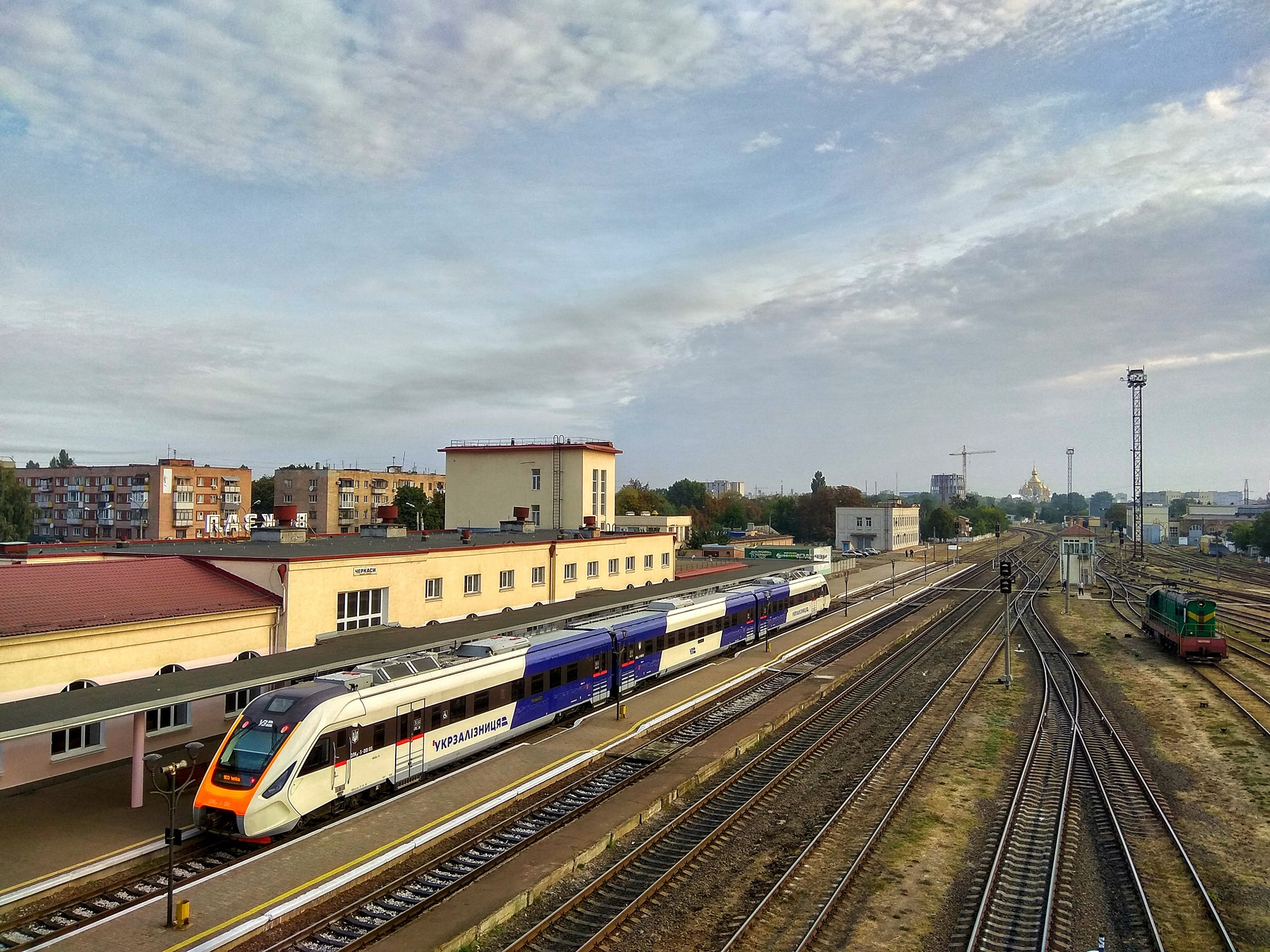
Cherkasy railway station

The Cherkasy railway station is the main railway station that serves the city. The city also has a railway stop, and both are operated by the state-owned Ukrzaliznytsia company. Cherkasy has regular connections to neighbouring cities with small diesel trains. The major rail route Odesa-Moscow passes through Cherkasy. One of the most important railway junctions in Ukraine is located 23 kilometres (14 miles) from Cherkasy, in the city of Smila, where the Kyiv–Dnipro and Odesa–Moscow rail routes cross.

=== Air and water transport ===
As Cherkasy is located on the bank of Kremenchuk reservoir, it has a small river port, the Cherkasy River Port. The previously extensive riverboat service along the Dnieper featuring the Raketa hydrofoil ships no longer exists, limiting river transport to cargo and tour boats and private pleasure craft.

The Cherkasy International Airport is located on the western edge of the city. Normally, it handles chartered flights across Ukraine since Boryspil International Airport near Kyiv handles most of Ukraine's international flights. In addition, Cherkasy Airport is being used as an alternative to Boryspil Airport in case of unforeseen situations and adverse weather conditions.

== Economy ==
Cherkasy is an important economic centre of Ukraine. Traditionally, the city's largest industries have been the chemical industry, the automotive industry and the food industry. The total yield generated by Cherkasy industries was near ₴7,894.3 billion, or 64% of the total income of Cherkasy Oblast.

The main industrial enterprises of Cherkasy are the following:

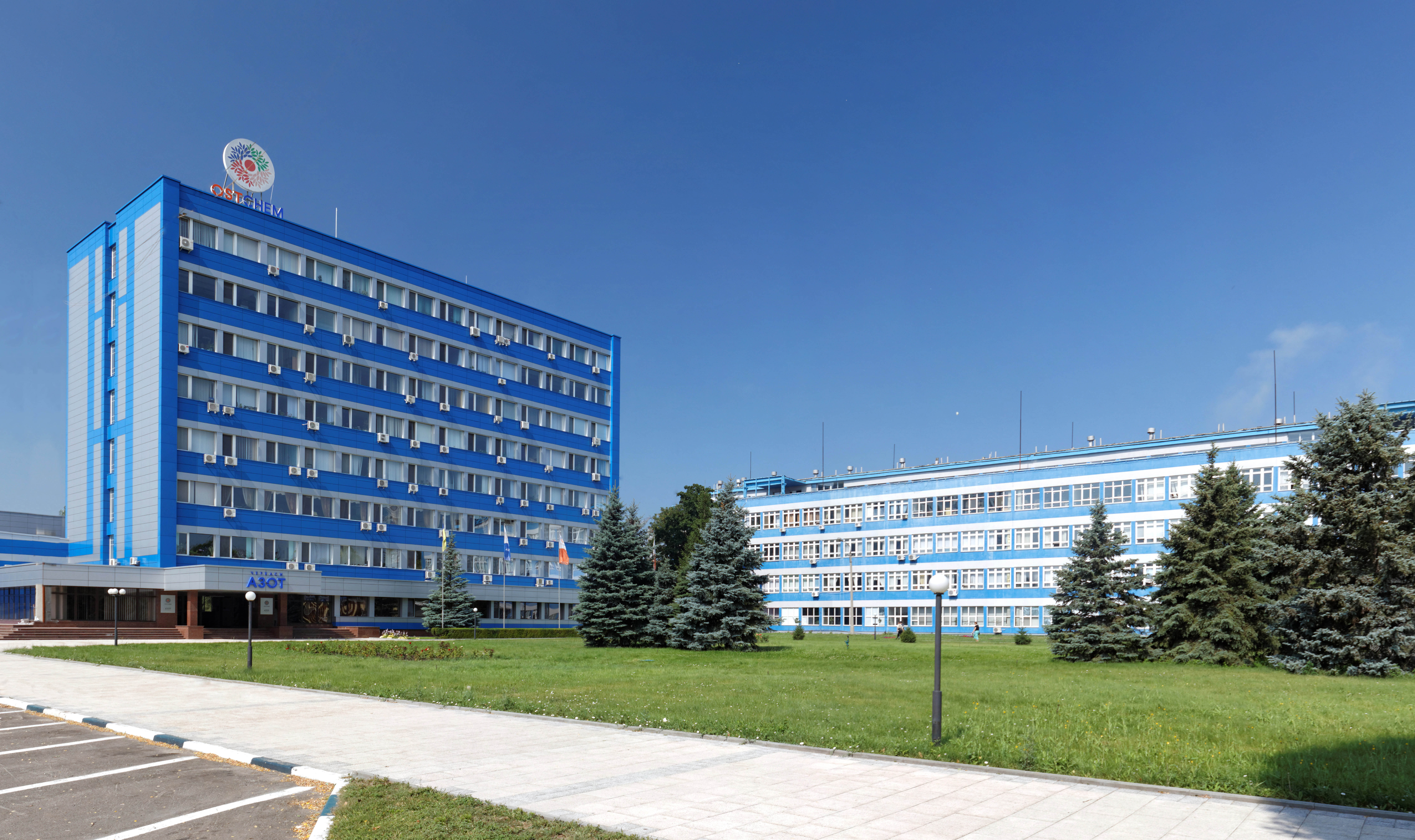
JSC "AZOT"

- Chemical industry: JSC "AZOT" (chemical fertilizers), "Aurora" plant (paints and varnishes), Cherkasy Autochemical Plant.
- Light industry: Cherkasy Silk combine, "Laventa" shoe factory, sewing factory named after Lesia Ukraiinka, "Vatfarm" (producer of medical and personal care products made of cotton-gauze)
- Mechanical engineering: JSC "CherkasyElevatorMash", JSC "Temp" (production of food industry equipment), "Photoprylad" (optical parts producing), 3 plants of the "Bogdan" corporation: a car assembly plant ("Hyundai" assembling), a truck assembling plant ("Isuzu" assembling) and a bus construction plant ("Bogdan" assembling).
- Food industry: "Buasson-Elit" Belvedere Group distillery, "Altera Azteka Milling Ukraine" corn processing and milling plant, JSC "Iuria" milk processing plant, "Svit Lasoschiv" confectionery, "ChPK" meat processing plant, "CherkasyKhlib" mechanized bakery.
- Timber and furniture industry: "Marelli" LLC, furniture factories "Romira" and "PM-plus".
- IT business: uCoz, InfoLand, In-Agro, QATestLab, SPD-Ukraine, ChallengeSoft.
- Internet-providers: McLaut, Fregat, Volia-cable, Ukrtelecom.

== Education ==
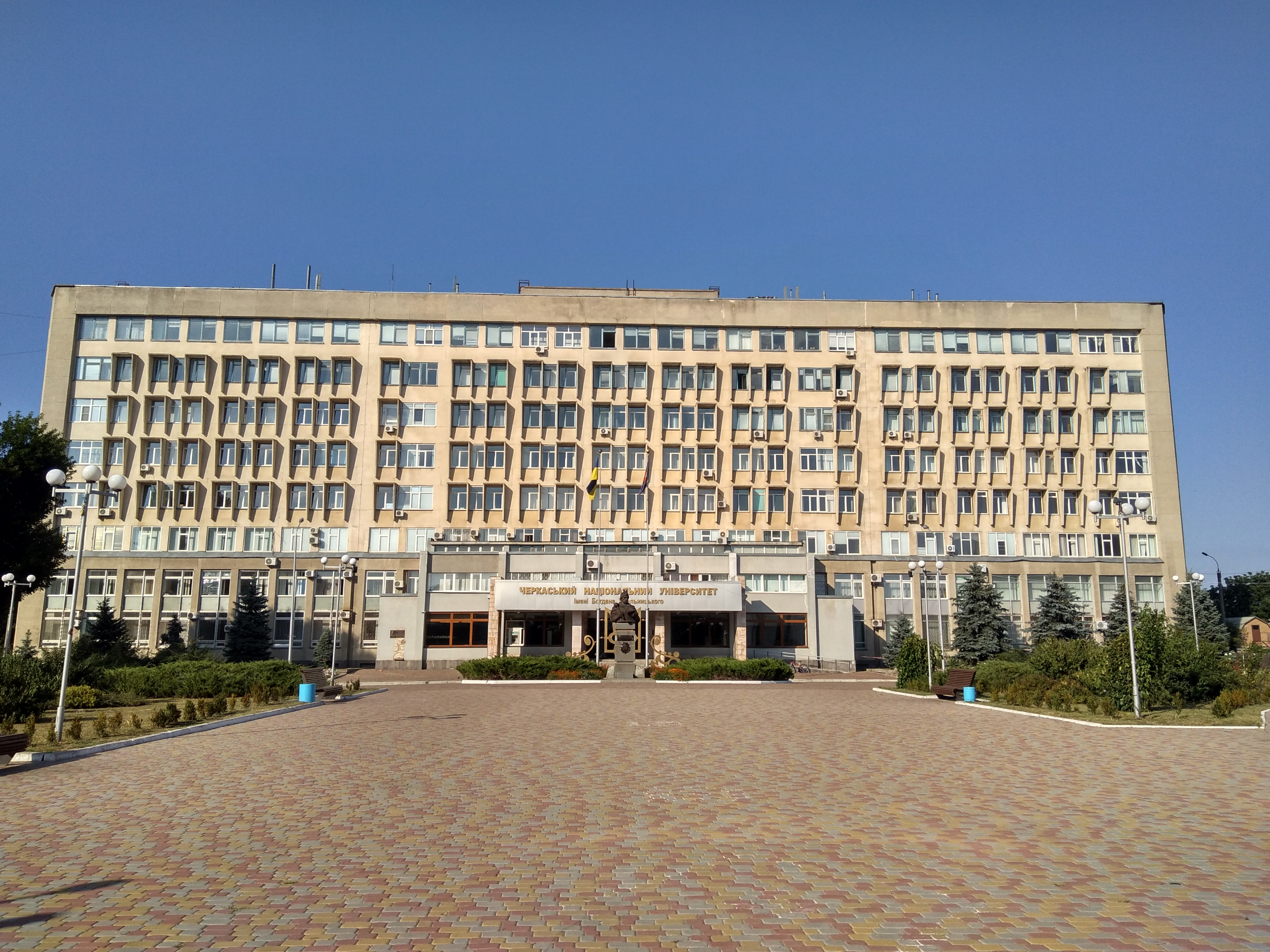
Cherkasy National University

Nowadays there are different types of educational institutions in Cherkasy – pre-school (kindergartens), schools, out-of-school and higher educational institutions. These institutions may be both state-owned and private property.

Pre-school education is represented with 50 kindergartens around the city.

City-owned schools are 21 general schools, 1 night school, and 14 new-type schools – 2 lyceums, 3 gymnasiums, collegiate, 8 specialized schools. This include First City Gymnasium, City Gymnasium No. 9 and No. 31, Cherkasy Physical and Mathematical Lyceum, Cherkasy Lyceum of Humanities and Law, Specialized School No. 17 (Associated UNESCO school), Cherkasy Collegiate "Berehynia", Specialized Schools No. 3, #13, No. 18, #20, No. 27, #28 and No. 33. Private schools are "Perlyna", school No. 770, and "Sofia".

Out-of-school institutions are Center of Youth Art, Young Sailors Club, Center of Tourism and Sports.

There is a number of post-secondary educational institutions:

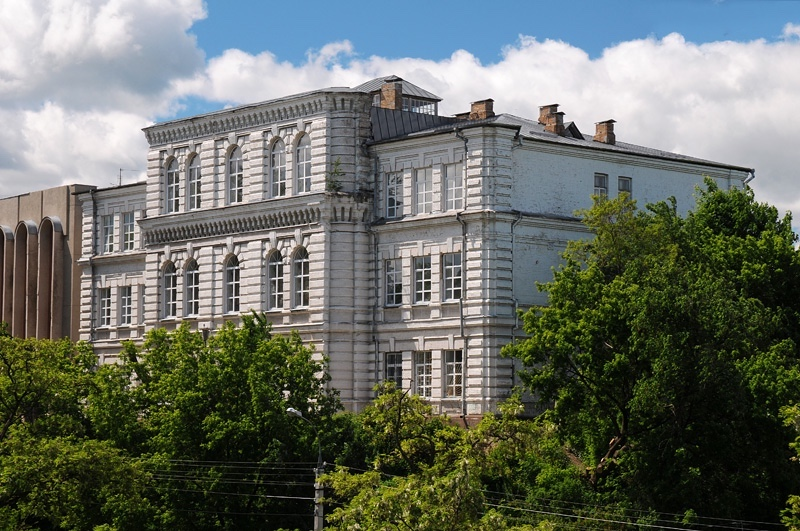
Men's gymnasium

- The Bohdan Khmelnytsky National University of Cherkasy
- Cherkasy State Technological University
- Cherkasy Institute of Bank Affairs (branch of Ukrainian Academy of Bank Affairs of National Bank of Ukraine)
- Academy of fire safety of Heroes of Chornobyl
- East European University of Economics and Management (private)
- National University Odesa Law Academy (branch)

There is a number of colleges (both state and private):

- Cherkasy Medical Academy
- Cherkasy State Business College
- Cherkasy Commercial Technical School
- Cherkasy Musical College
- Cherkasy Cooperative Economics and Law College

Several public libraries are serving the city – Central Library of Lesia Ukrainka, City Library for Youth and Children, Central Oblast Library of Taras Shevchenko.

== Culture and recreation ==
Cherkasy is a big cultural centre. Several theatres, philharmonic, 3 cinemas, numerous museums and clubs are serving the city. The city has 3 indoor skating rinks. People can relax in big parks and gardens around the city, they can also visit city's zoo. Cherkasy is among the cities in Ukraine that have their own planetarium.

=== Museums ===
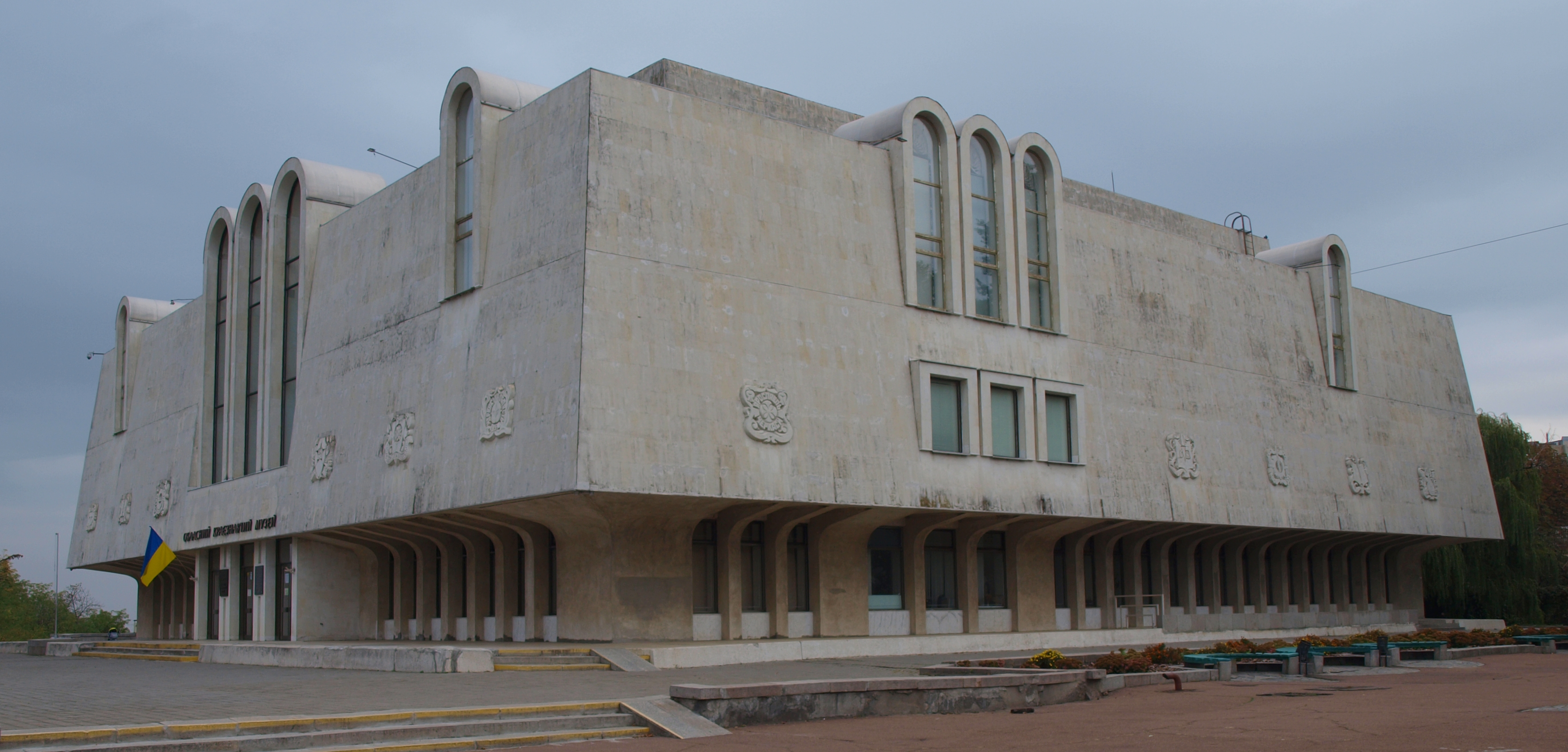
Cherkasy Oblast Local History Museum

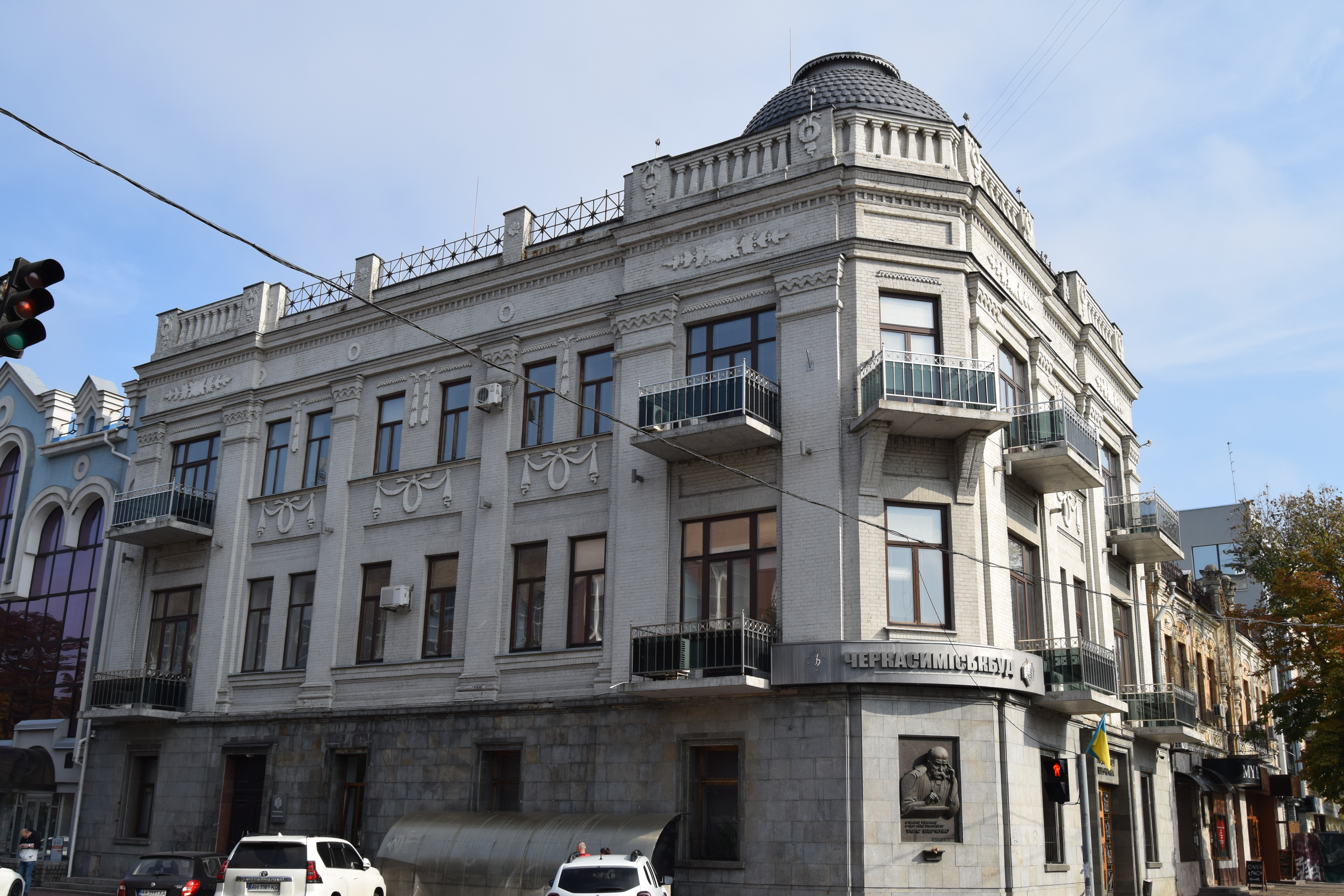
"Kobzar" Museum of Taras Shevchenko

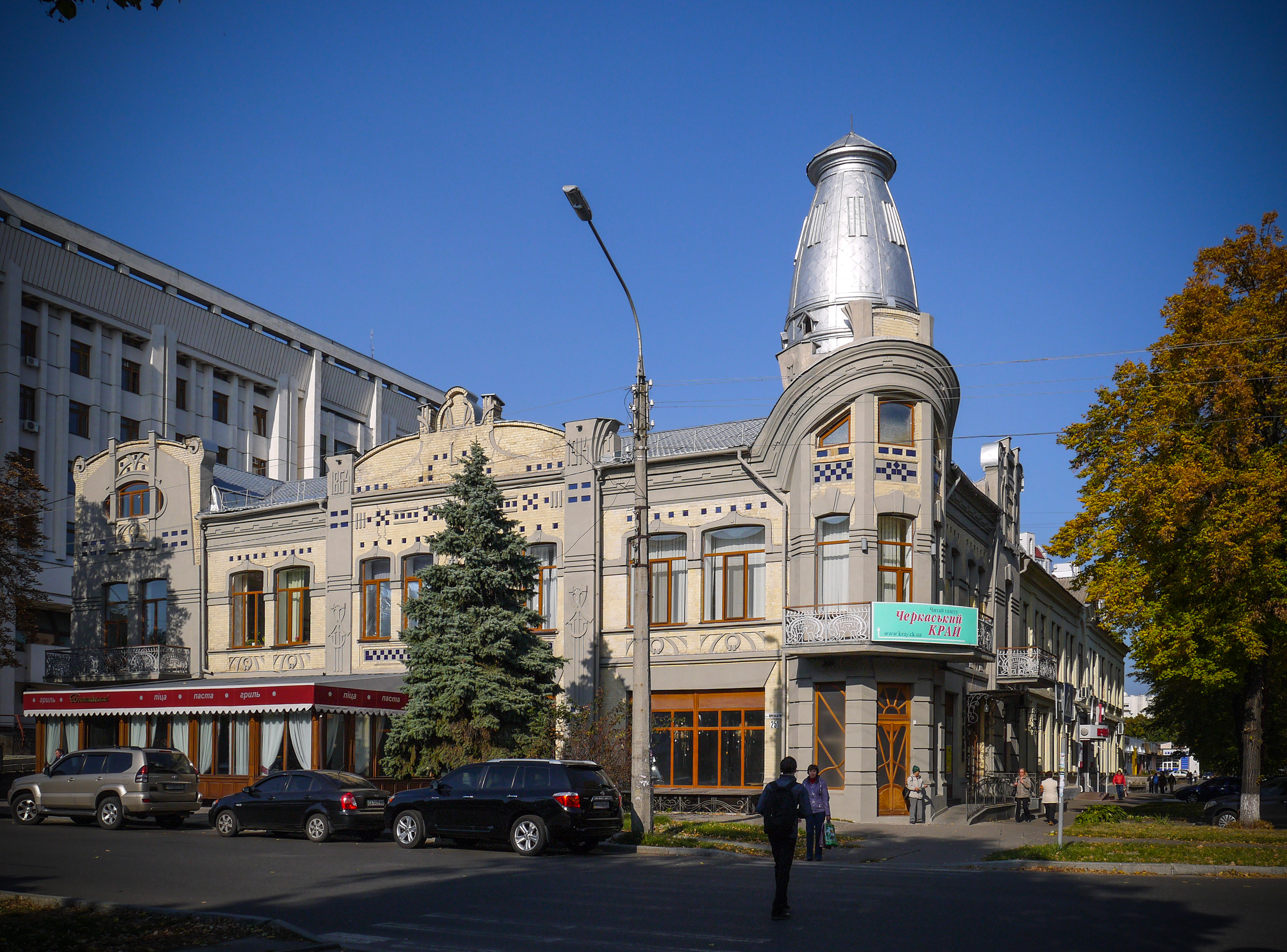
Literary Memorial Museum of Vasyl Symonenko

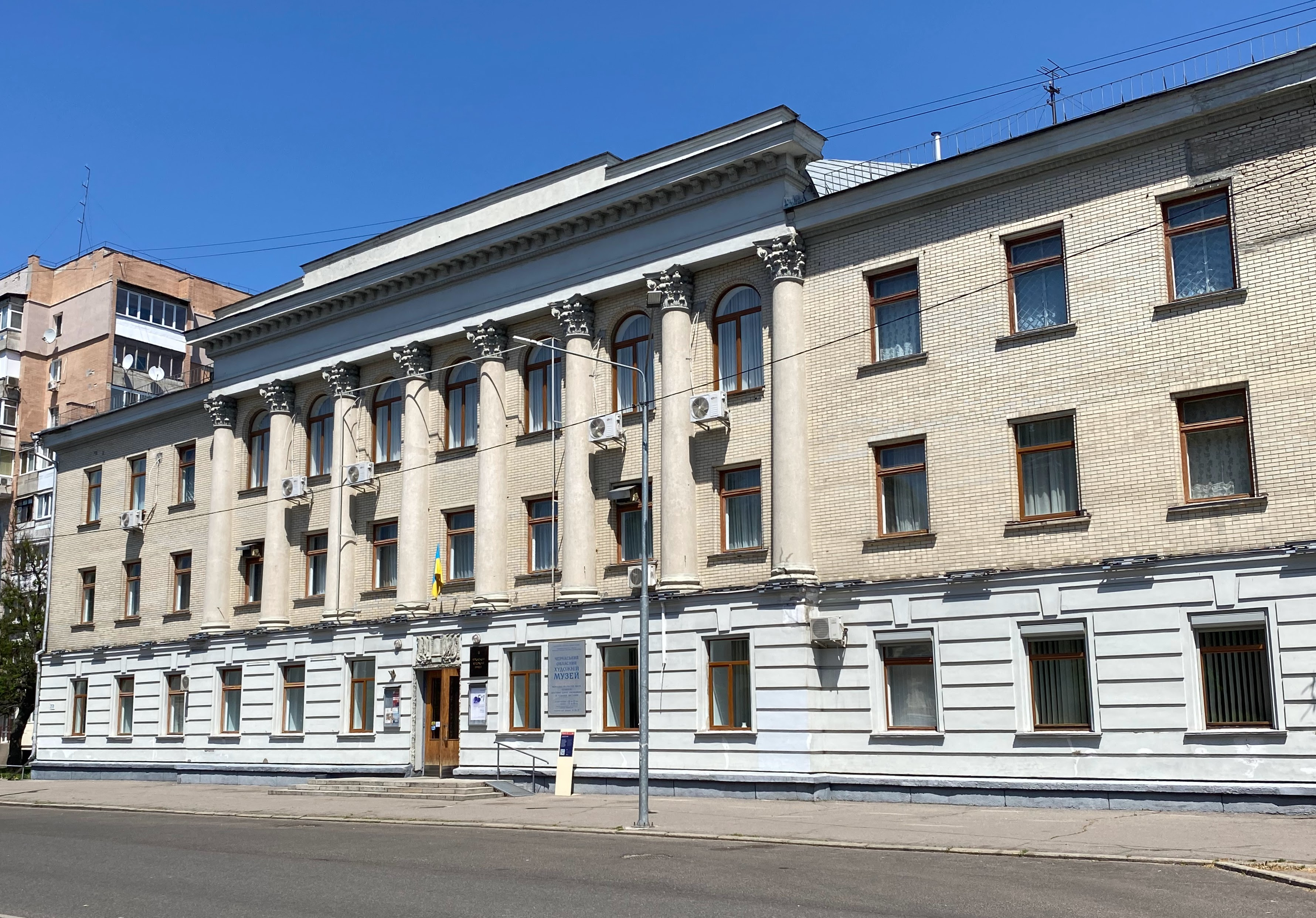
Cherkasy Art Museum

The biggest museums of Cherkasy are:

- Cherkasy Oblast Local History Museum – the collection of artifacts from the history, nature, culture, and ethnography of Cherkasy Oblast.
- "Kobzar" Museum of Taras Shevchenko – the only museum in the world about one book.
- Cherkasy Art Museum – big museum where different exhibitions are held throughout the year.
- Cherkasy Literary Memorial Museum of Vasyl Symonenko.
- Cherkasy Museum of Vyshyvanka

=== Theatres and music ===
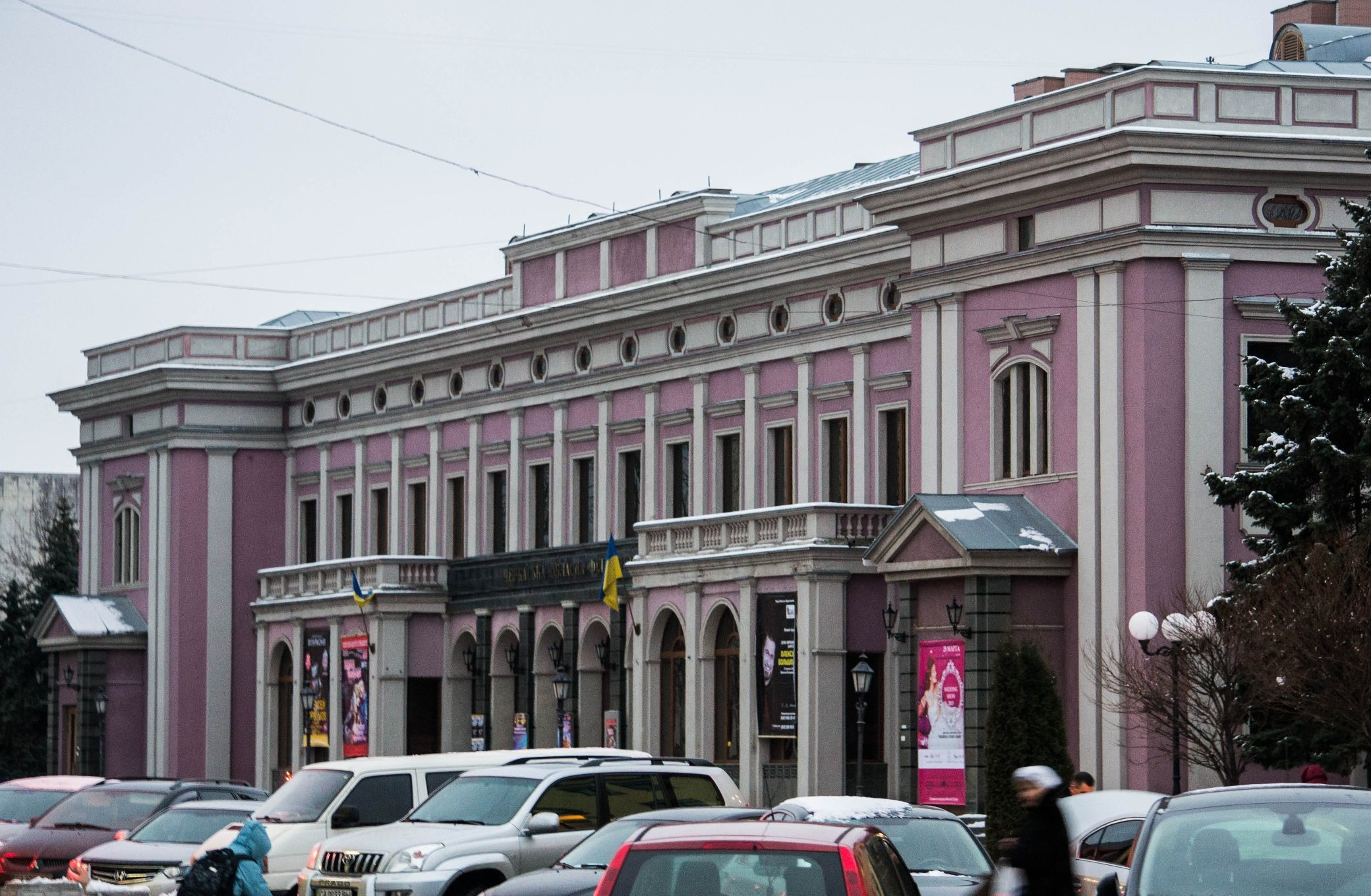
Cherkasy Philharmonic

There are several theatres in Cherkasy, such as:

- Taras Shevchenko Ukrainian Academic Drama Theatre of Cherkasy
- Cherkasy Academic Puppet Theater
- Youth Theater "Suchasnyk"

The city has its own philharmonic, which was created in 1955. The big cultural centre is concert hall "Druzhba Narodiv" (Friendship of Nations), where all major concerts are held. Besides, there are numerous local cultural clubs.

The city has 4 modern movie theatres – "Salut" (a very old building, was the first cinema in Cherkasy), "Ukraine", "Dnipro Plaza" and "Lubava".

=== Recreation ===
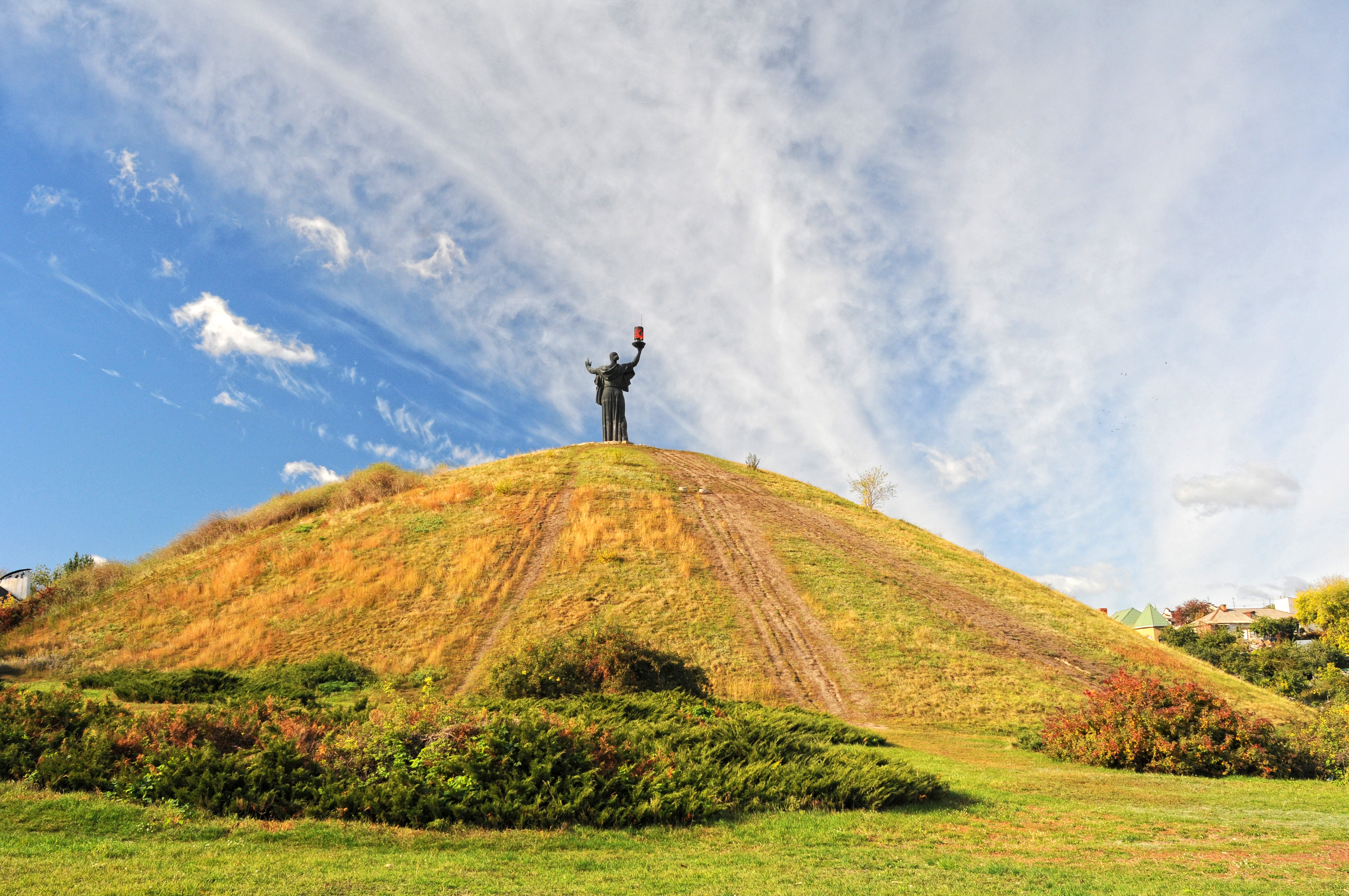
Park Peremohy (Victory Park) in summer

Cherkasy is famous as a green city. The main parks are Park Peremohy (Victory Park) with a zoo, Sobornyi Park (Cathedral Park), Juvileyniy Park (Jubilee Park), Park Himikiv (Park of Chemists), Dolyna Troiand (Rose Valley), and two children's parks. Traditional places of summer recreation are beaches of Dnipro River. The coastline of the city is as long as 15 kilometres (9 miles), and is usually represented with sand beaches. Infrastructure of the beaches is under development right now, although several recreational complexes are already built. On the northern end of the city, in Cherkasy Forest, sanatorium "Ukraine" is situated, along with three-star hotel "Ukraine", and "Kosmos-Bowling" club. There are also several hotels in the city which can accommodate people with different tastes.

=== Festivals ===
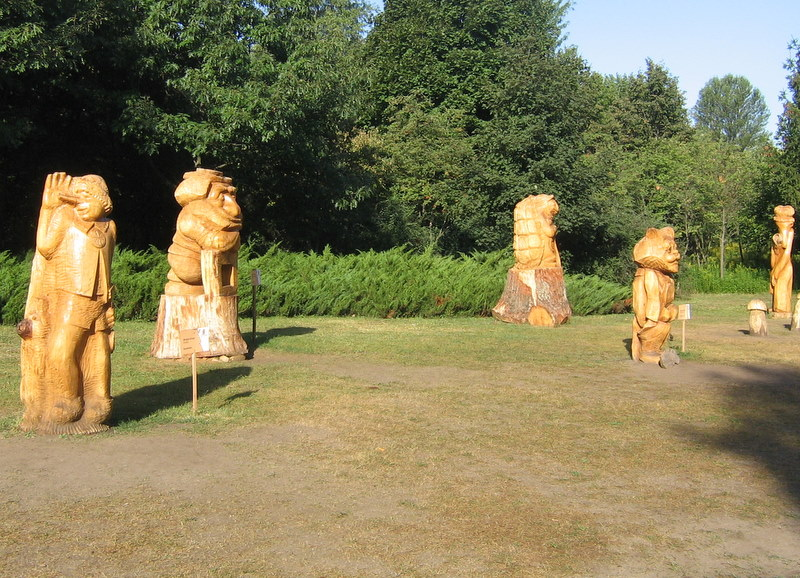
Wood sculptures at "Drevlyandia" festival

The city is famous for its sculpture festivals – "Kryzhtal" (held in winter, sculptures are made of ice), "Drevlyandia" (held in summer, sculptures are made of wood, then placed in parks around the city), and "Zhyvyi Kamin" (held in autumn, sculptures are made of stone). Along with the last, "Cherkasy's Singing Nights" are held in the open-air theatre in park. Since 2003, Cherkasy hosts international bike festival "Tarasova Gora", which gathers bikers from Ukraine, Russia, and other European countries. This is the biggest festival of this kind held in Ukraine.

The city also hosts a music festival (sponsored by Pentax-Richo), that takes the name "Takumar5555", that is the old Pentax brand name, and a play on the city's 55th year of independence.

== Mass media ==
Cherkasy is a major media market which is served by several local TV stations, newspapers, and numerous radio stations.

Numerous newspapers are published in the city, "Antenna", "Molod' Cherkashchyny", "Vechirni Cherkasy", "Akcent", "Nova Doba", "Misto", "Cherkasky Kray", "Procherk", "18000" etc.

Cherkasy has 5 TV stations – Vikka, Antenna-Plus, Media-Center, Expo-TV, and public broadcaster Suspilne Cherkasy (formerly known as Ros', then UA:Cherkasy). The city is also covered by nationwide channel broadcasting, such as 1+1, Inter, ICTV, STB, and TET.

The city's radio stations are mostly nationwide networks broadcast on local frequencies, although some local stations exist. FM radio stations include KISS FM, Hit FM, Radio Luks, Radio Rocks, Shanson, Ros', Era FM, Love Radio, 101Dalmatin, Dobre Radio.

== Sports ==
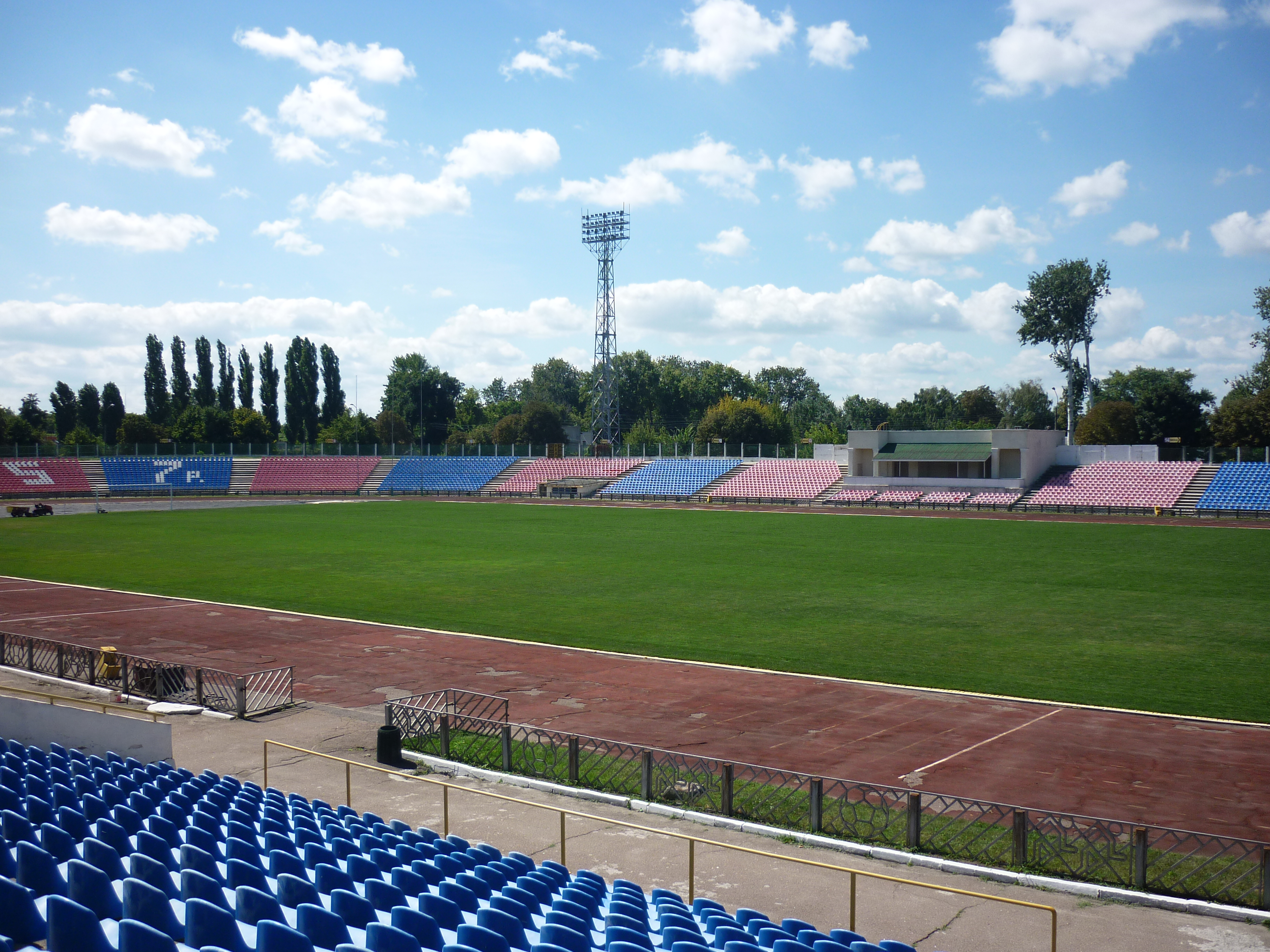
Central stadium

Sport life of the city is concentrated in several places, among which are the Central Stadium, Water Sport station, Sport Center "Spartak", "Ukraine"; Sport arena "Budivel'nyk"; "Astra", "Central", "Sokil" swimming pools; 2 ice rinks. Also, there are sport-entertainment centres, such as "Selena", "Bochka", and "Sportohota" which can usually be found on the bank of the Dnipro River.

Every year more than 200 sport events, contests, competitions, tournaments are held in the city, with total of 10,000 participants. Some contests that were held recently include:

- The European Women's Powerlifting Championships in 1998 saw lifters from across Europe.
- Ukrainian Aquabike Cup in 2008 hosted bikers from Cherkasy, Odesa, Kyiv, and former Dnipropetrovsk. It was held in "Bochka" entertainment centre.
- Kremenchuk Reservoir Cup – yacht contest among cities located on Kremenchuk Reservoir. Hosted 27 teams from Svitlovodsk, Kremenchuk, Cherkasy, and Komsomolsk.
- Ukrainian Beach Volleyball Championship – was held in 2008 on the courts of "Rybka" complex
- Group 2 Euro/Africa Zone matches of 2008 Davis Cup were held in Cherkasy, in "Selena" sport complex.

Other sport achievements are:

- Cherkasy is home to the football club FC LNZ Cherkasy
- Cherkasy was home to the football club FC Dnipro Cherkasy
- Cherkasy is home to the basketball club BC Cherkasy (a.k.a. the Cherkasy Monkeys).
- Cherkasy is home to the volleyball clubs Krug Cherkasy, Zlatogor Zolotonosha Cherkasy (women) and Impexagro Sport Cherkasy (men). They all play in the European tournaments 2008/2009.
- Cherkasy is represented within Ukrainian Bandy and Rink-bandy Federation.

== Architecture and sights ==
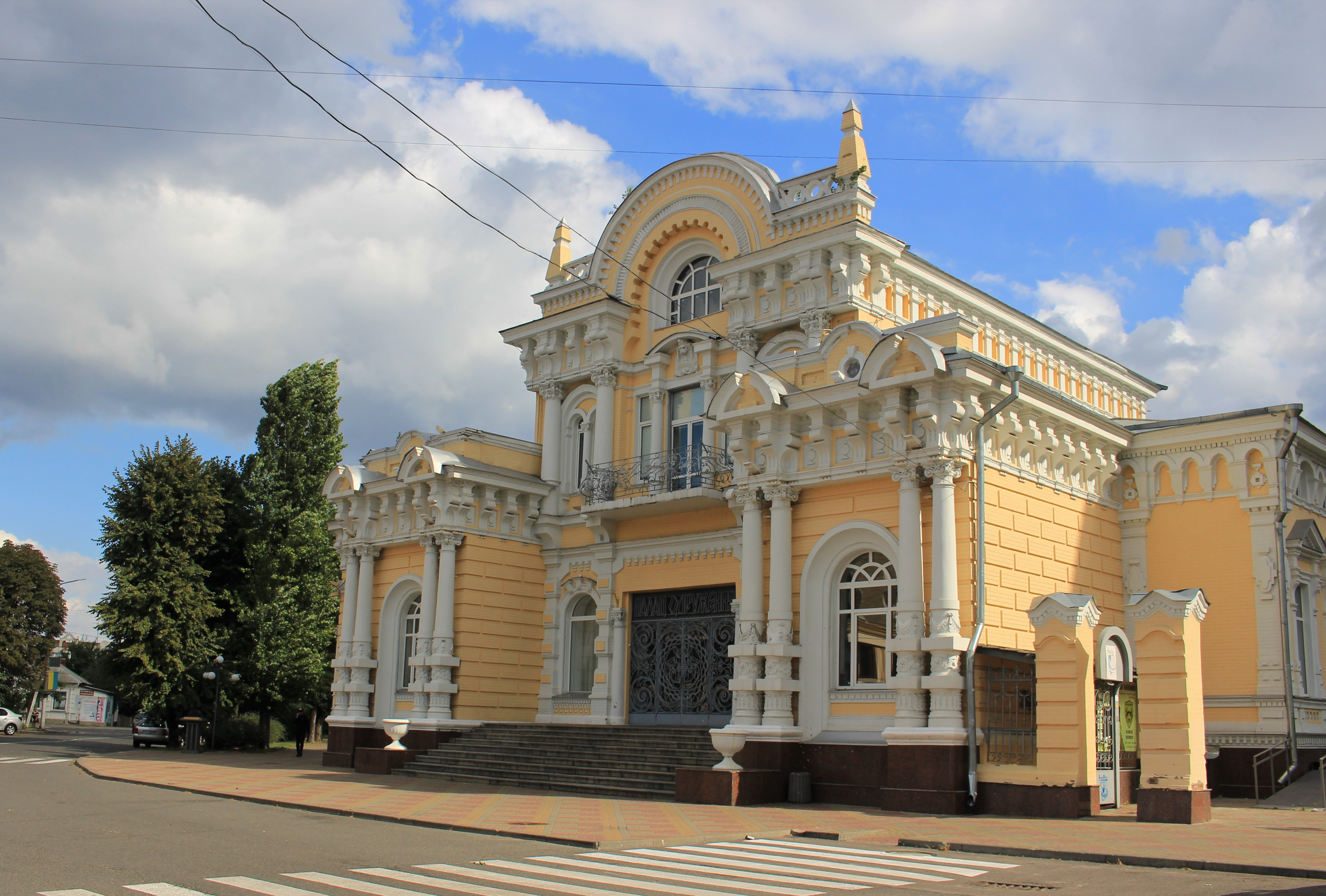
City Wedding Palace

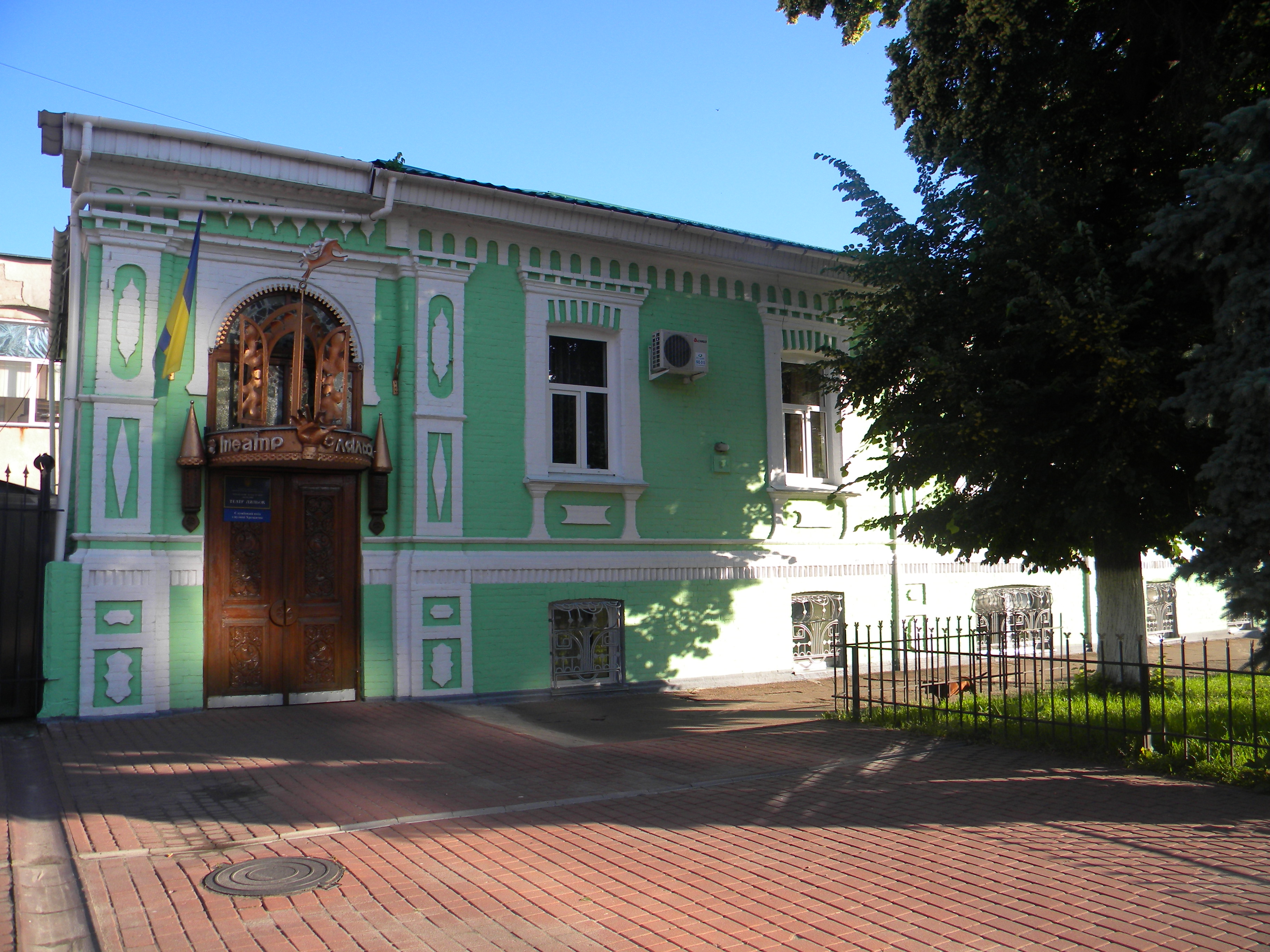
Cherkasy Puppet Theater

During its whole history Cherkasy was destroyed and rebuilt numerous times. Only few buildings from the 19th century survived. The system of streets and squares in the old part of the city is one of the few monuments to the city-building art of 19th century Ukraine.

- Scherbina House (Wedding Palace). It was the most luxurious mansion of prerevolutionary Cherkasy. In Soviet times it was known as the "Palace of Happiness" because it was city's registry office. The house was built by entrepreneur A. Scherbina in 1892. From 1970 to the present day the building is used as the Wedding Palace (civil registry agency).
- The building of former hotel "Slavyanskiy". It was constructed in the late 19th century by means of an entrepreneur Skoryna in a modernist style with elements of pseudo. In Soviet times it was a hotel "Dnepr". Today the building belongs to "Ukrsotsbank".
- Tsybulsky House (Museum of Kobzar). This historic building located in the centre of the city was built in the middle of the 19th century. In Soviet times museum of one book – "Kobzar" by Shevchenko – was opened there.
- Castle Hill (Hill of Glory). The memorial complex with a monument "Motherland" is located at the top of the former Castle Hill. At this point, ancient Cossack fort, remains of Cherkasy fortress and Holy Trinity Church were situated. In 1977 all architectural and archaeological sites were completely destroyed during construction of the monument, although the new Holy Trinity Cathedral was constructed nearby. From the top of the hill a panoramic view opens on the Kremenchuk Reservoir.
- Local History Museum. Cherkasy Oblast museum is housed in a modern building, built in 1985 in the historic centre of the city near the Hill of Glory (Castle Hill). Thirty halls of the museum offer sections about nature of the region, archaeology, ethnography, history of the region in the 14th – early 20th century, modern history from 1917 to the present. In total there are about 12 thousand exhibits.
- Puppet Theatre. Cherkasy Regional Academic Puppet Theater is located in the central part of the city, in a building that is an architectural monument of the 19th century. The building is decorated with mosaics with the heroes of fairy tales.
- School of Music. The building of Cherkasy Music School of S. Gulak-Artemovsky was built in 1903 as a men's gymnasium. The author of the project was great Kyiv architect of Polish origin V. Gorodetsky. In the second half of the 20th century, after the construction of a modern extension, the building became the home of a music school.
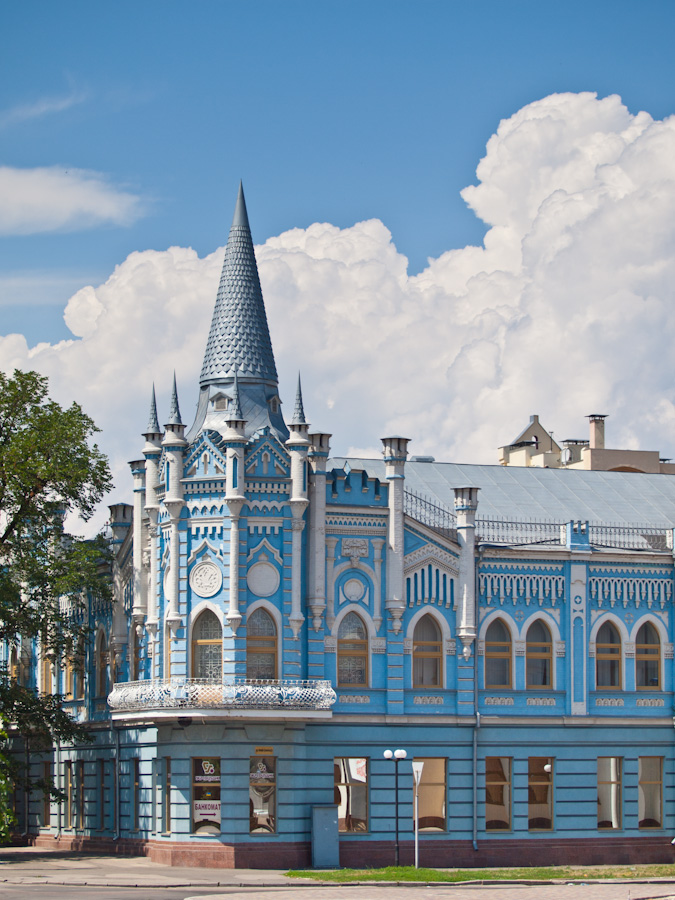
Building of the former Slovyanskyi Hotel, now a bank

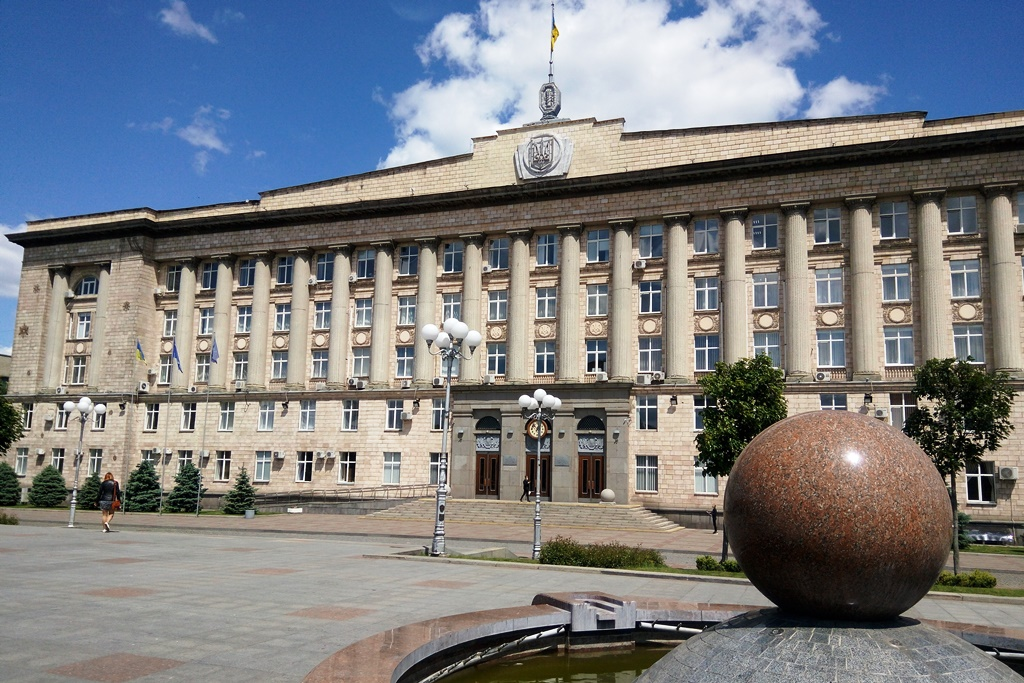
Administration building

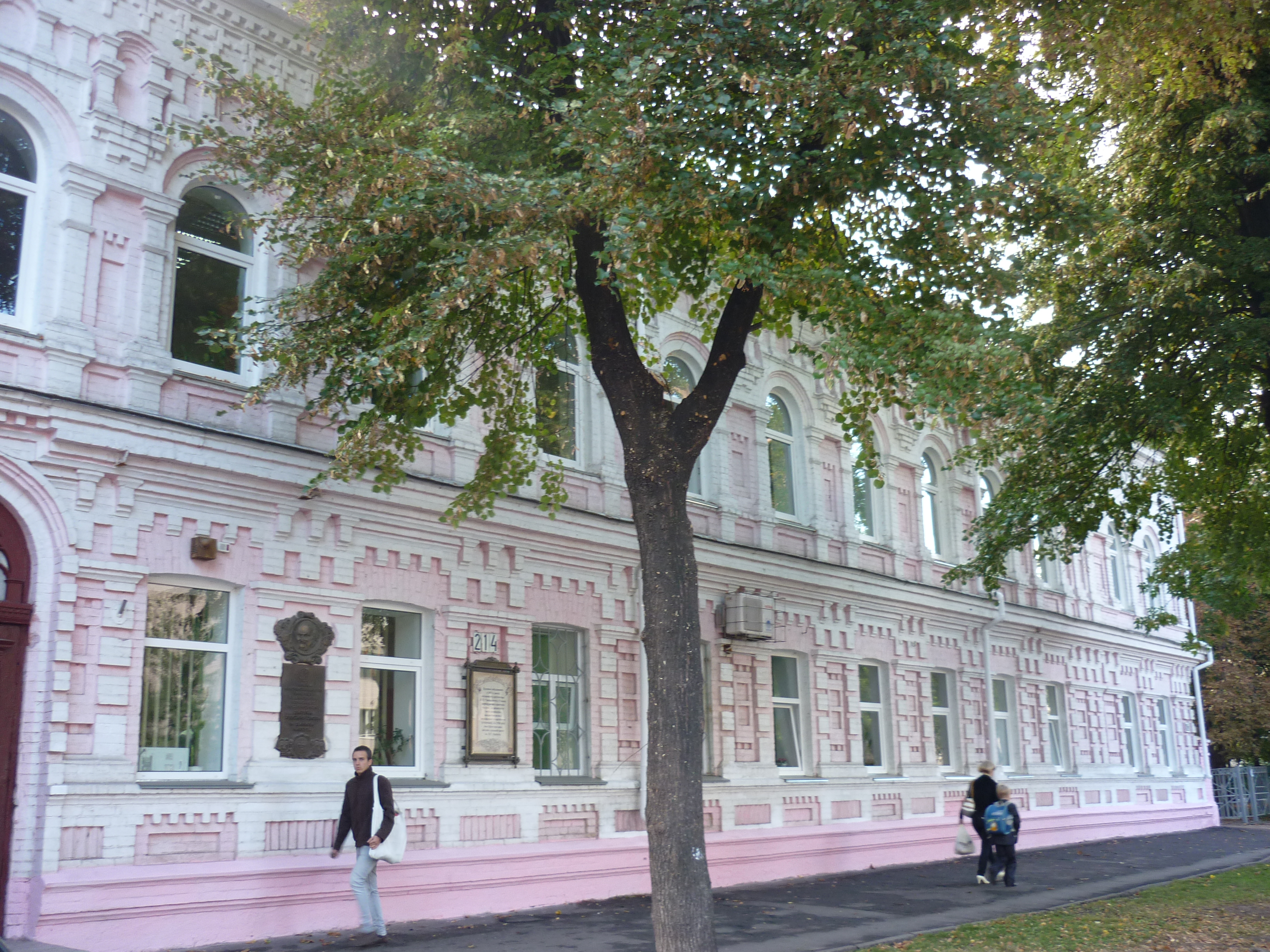
Children’s Art School

Monument to Holodomor victims

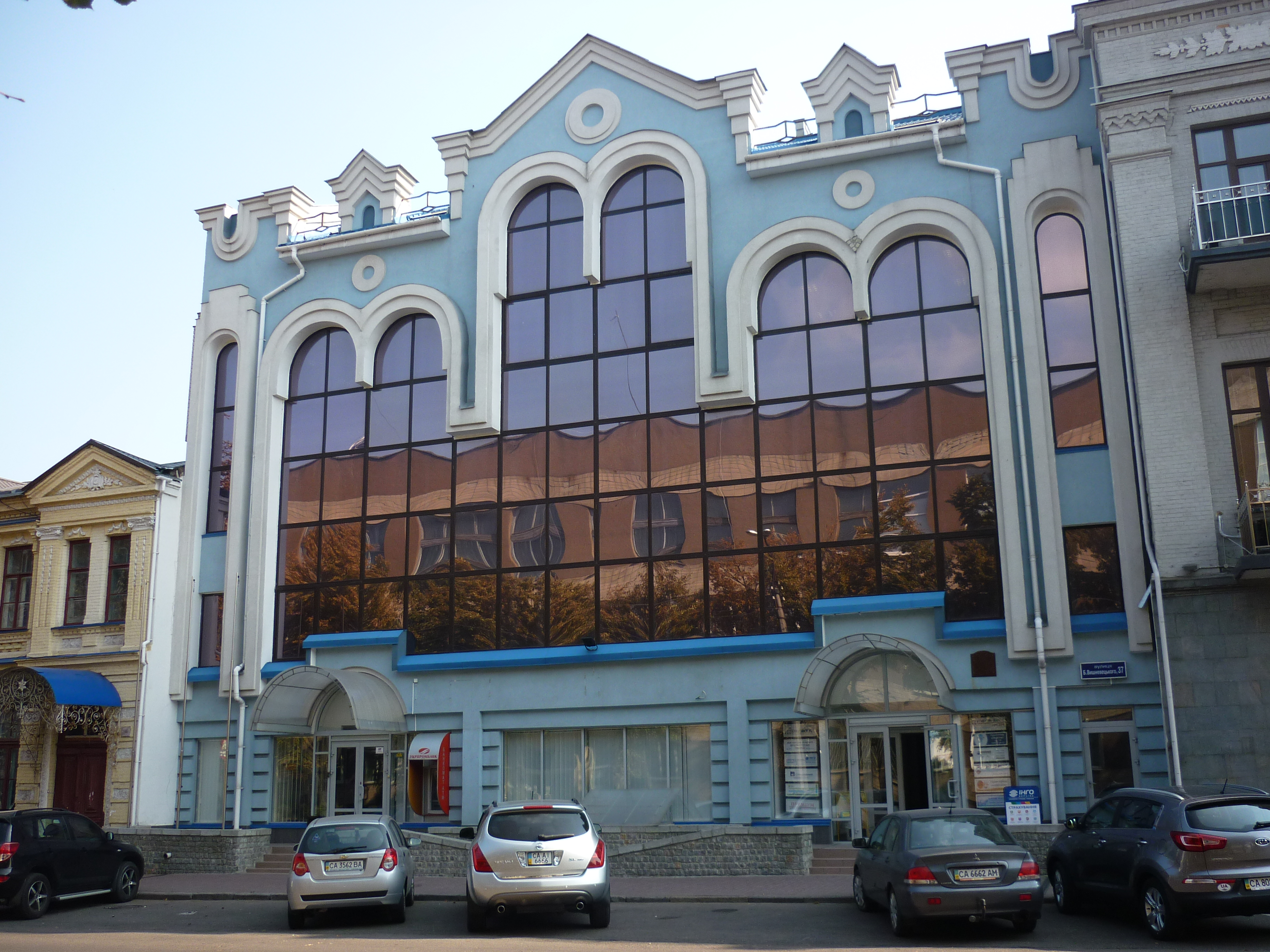
A building on Vyshnevetskoho street

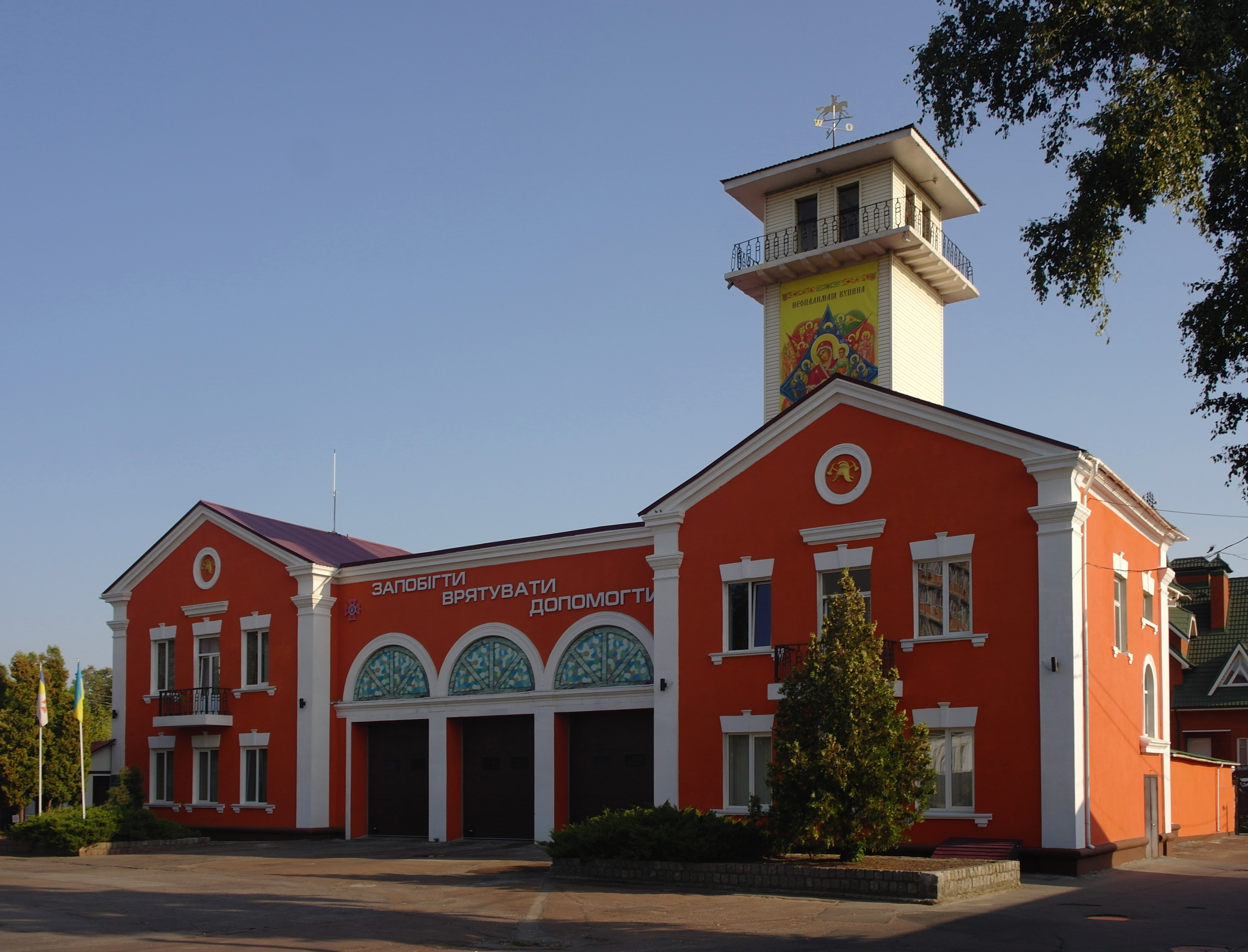
Fire station

== Notable people ==
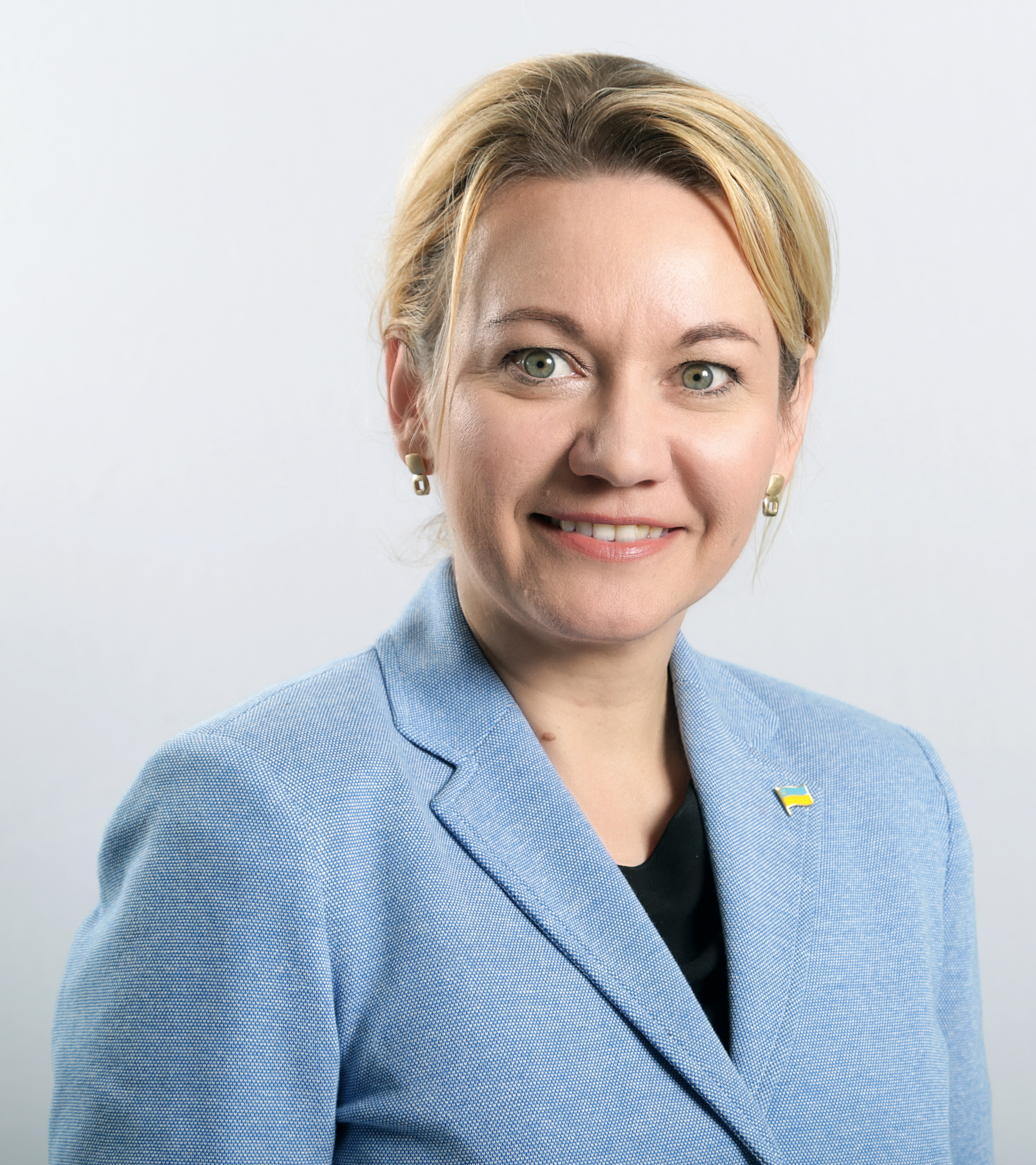
Olga Bielkova, 2019

- Anna Asti (born 1990), a Ukrainian pop singer.
- Tykhin Baybuza (16th C.) a Registered Cossacks Senior from 1597 to 1598.
- Olga Bielkova (born 1975) a former Member of the Ukrainian Parliament from 2012 to 2020
- Timofiy Bilohradsky (ca.1710 - ca.1782) a lutenist, composer and kobzar-bandurist from Ukraine
- Samuel Cashwan (1900–1988) an American sculptor.
- Volodymyr Dashkovsky (born 1965) a Ukrainian military conductor and composer
- Eduard Gudzenko (1938–2006) a Ukrainian expressionist artist.
- Yuri Ilyenko (1936–2010) film director and screenwriter, directed 12 films between 1965 and 2002.
- Irena Karpa (born 1980) a Ukrainian writer, journalist, and singer.
- Andriy Khlyvnyuk (born 1979) Ukrainian musician, vocalist and lyricist of the group BoomBox.
- Vitalij Kowaljow (born 1968) a bass opera singer, lives in Switzerland.
- Louis Krasner (1903–1995), American classical violinist
- Natalya Lagoda (1974–2015) a Russian–Ukrainian singer, entertainer and model.
- Levi Olan (1903–1984) an American Reform Jewish rabbi, liberal social activist and author.
- Miron Polyakin (1895-1941) Russian and Soviet violinist, disciple of Leopold Auer.
- Bert Ramelson (1910–1994), industrial organiser and politician for the CPGB.
- Oleksandr Skichko (born 1991) Ukrainian politician, comedian, actor and TV presenter.
- Aleksandr Sokiryansky (1937-2019), Soviet Moldavian composer and musicologist.
- Roman Sushchenko (born 1969) a Ukrainian journalist and artist.
- Moisei Uritsky (1873–1918) a Bolshevik revolutionary leader in Russia.
- Semyon Uritsky (1895–1938) a Soviet General, also fought in the Imperial Russian Army
- Lazar Weiner (1897–1982) Imperial Russian-born, American-naturalized composer of Yiddish song.
- Olexiy Yurin (born 1982) Ukrainian poet, pedagogue and interpreter; he lives in Bulgaria.
- Nataliia Zabolotna (born 1973) activist

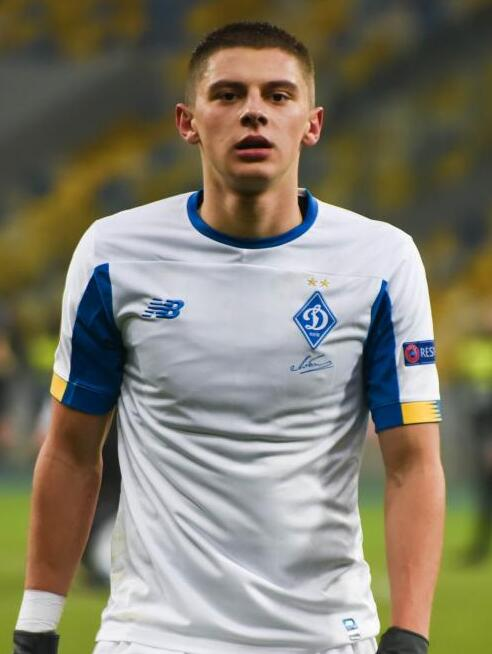
Vitaliy Mykolenko, 2019

=== Sport ===
- Nazar Chepurnyi (born 2002), a Ukrainian artistic gymnast.
- Valentin Demyanenko (born 1983) former Ukrainian-born Azerbaijani flat-water canoeist.
- Artem Dovbyk (born 1997) a footballer with over 120 club caps and 11 for Ukraine, in the 2023/24 La Liga season he won the Pichichi Trophy, as the player with the most seasonal goals in the Spanish league.
- Serhiy Kulish (born 1993) Ukrainian sport shooter, silver medallist at the 2016 Summer Olympics
- Illia Kovtun (born 2003), a Ukrainian artistic gymnast and 2024 Olympic silver medalist
- Sviatoslav Mykhailiuk (born 1997), a Ukrainian professional basketball player for the Boston Celtics of the National Basketball Association.
- Vitaliy Mykolenko (born 1999) footballer with Everton, over 100 club caps and 26 for Ukraine
- Dmytro Skapintsev (born 1998), a Ukrainian professional basketball player for Hapoel Jerusalem of the Israeli Basketball Premier League
- Ihor Stolovytskyi (born 1969) former Soviet and Ukrainian footballer and coach with 510 club caps.
- Stanislav Sukhina (born 1968) a Russian football official and former referee and player.
- Katerina Zhidkova (born 1989), a Ukrainian-born Azerbaijani volleyball player

== Twin towns – sister cities ==
Cherkasy is twinned with:

- Vagharshapat, Armenia
- Bydgoszcz, Poland
- Fergana, Uzbekistan
- Jilin City, China
- Kuşadası, Turkey
- Madaba, Jordan
- Mazyr District, Belarus
- Orsha, Belarus
- Petah Tikva, Israel
- (Georgia (country)) Rustavi, Georgia
- Sumqayit, Azerbaijan
- Wanzhou District, China
- (United States) Santa Rosa, California USA
- Valmiera, Latvia

== See also ==
- List of cities in Ukraine
