= Tykhin Baybuza =

Ukrainian military commander

Tykhin Baibuza coat of arms

Tykhin Baybuza (Ukrainian: Тихін Михайлович Байбуза) was a Registered Cossacks Senior (1597–1598).

He was born in Cherkasy to Ukrainian boyar Mykhaylo Baybuza-Hrybunovych and grandson of Ografena Glinsky.

During the Cossack rebellion of 1596, he was in the Polish army. When being Hetman, Baybuza carried out politics peaceful towards the Polish–Lithuanian Government.

== See also ==
- Hetmans of Ukrainian Cossacks
