= Glinski =

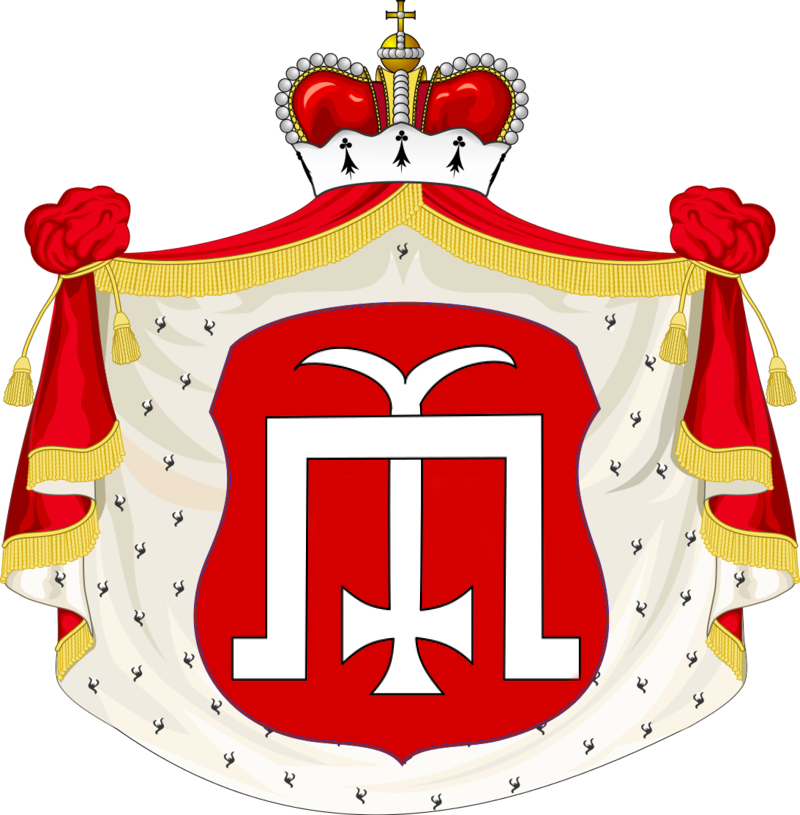
Coat of arms of Princes Glinski

The House of Glinski (Polish: Gliński) was an ancient Russian princely family, part of the Russian nobility, originated in the Grand Duchy of Lithuania, whose ancestors were members of the Lipka Tatar clan who claimed descent from the Mongol ruler Mamai.

== Surname ==
Glinski, Glinskii, Glinsky, or Glinskiy (Polish: Gliński, Hliński, Lithuanian: Glinskis, Russian: Глинский), is also a family name. Feminine form: Russian: Glinskaya (Глинская), Polish: Glińska.

== Notable people ==
- Anna Glinskaya (died 1553), Russian noble, mother of Elena Glinskaya
- Elena Glinskaya (c. 1510–1538), Russian regent, daughter of Anna Glinskaya
- Michael Glinski (died 1534), uncle of Tsar Ivan the Terrible
- Mikhail Iosifovich Glinsky (1901–1991), Soviet Union general
- Frank J. Glinski (1909–1983), New York politician
- Julianna Glinski (1920-1995), United States First Lieutenant, US Women’s Army Corps
- Wieńczysław Gliński (1921–2008), Polish actor
- Juozas Glinskis (born 1933), Lithuanian playwright
- Albert Glinsky (born 1952), United States composer & author
- Piotr Gliński (born 1954), Polish sociologist
- Robert Gliński (born 1952), Polish film director
- Vladislav Glinskiy (born 2000), Belarusian footballer
- Władysław Gliński, the inventor of Gliński's hexagonal chess

== See also ==
- Gliński coat of arms
- Hlynsk, Romny Raion
