= 1376 =

1376 in various calendars
- Gregorian calendar: 1376; MCCCLXXVI
- Ab urbe condita: 2129
- Armenian calendar: 825; ԹՎ ՊԻԵ
- Assyrian calendar: 6126
- Balinese saka calendar: 1297–1298
- Bengali calendar: 782–783
- Berber calendar: 2326
- English Regnal year: 49 Edw. 3 – 50 Edw. 3
- Buddhist calendar: 1920
- Burmese calendar: 738
- Byzantine calendar: 6884–6885
- Chinese calendar: 乙卯年 (Wood Rabbit); 4073 or 3866 — to — 丙辰年 (Fire Dragon); 4074 or 3867
- Coptic calendar: 1092–1093
- Discordian calendar: 2542
- Ethiopian calendar: 1368–1369
- Hebrew calendar: 5136–5137
- Hindu calendars
- Vikram Samvat: 1432–1433
- Shaka Samvat: 1297–1298
- Kali Yuga: 4476–4477
- Holocene calendar: 11376
- Igbo calendar: 376–377
- Iranian calendar: 754–755
- Islamic calendar: 777–778
- Japanese calendar: Eiwa 2 (永和２年)
- Javanese calendar: 1289–1290
- Julian calendar: 1376; MCCCLXXVI
- Korean calendar: 3709
- Minguo calendar: 536 before ROC 民前536年
- Nanakshahi calendar: −92
- Thai solar calendar: 1918–1919
- Tibetan calendar: ཤིང་མོ་ཡོས་ལོ་ (female Wood-Hare); 1502 or 1121 or 349 — to — མེ་ཕོ་འབྲུག་ལོ་ (male Fire-Dragon); 1503 or 1122 or 350

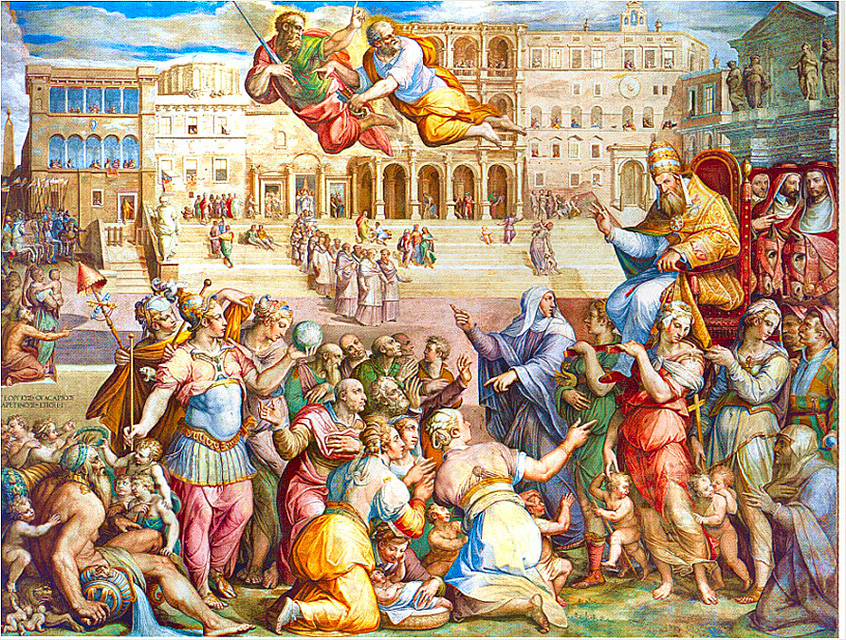
June 16: Saint Catherine of Siena visits Pope Gregory XI in France and persuades him to travel from Avignon to Rome for a peace mission.

Year 1376 (MCCCLXXVI) was a leap year starting on Tuesday of the Julian calendar.

== Events ==
=== January–March ===
- January 23 – In the Holy Roman Empire, Wenceslaus I, Duke of Saxe-Wittenberg and Elector of Saxony, marries Cecilia da Carrara, daughter of Francesco I da Carrara, Lord of Padua.
- January – In what is now Myanmar Ma Sein of Toungoo, the Viceroy of Taungoo who had been appointed by the King of Binnya U of Hanthawaddy to replace the assassinated Viceroy Pyanchi, is murdered near Pyay while trying to forment a rebellion against the Kingdom of Ava.
- February 12 – English mercenary John Hawkwood, condottiero for Pope Gregory XI in the War of the Eight Saints against the Republic of Florence, arrives at Faenza to suppress a potential revolt against the papal governor. He and his soldiers, who were not paid by the Pope, go on to loot the town instead of protecting it.
- February 19 – Jan III becomes the new Duke of Oświęcim in Poland upon the death of his father, Jan II of Oświęcim.
- February 26 – The Böse Fasnacht, a riot in the Swiss city of Basel, breaks out during a tournament at a carnival and numerous people are killed, including several of the soldiers of the Duke of Austria, Leopold III. The city council arrests and executes 12 perpetrators, but Duke Leopold proceeds with placing the city under stricter control.
- March 12 – The Treaty of Bruges, signed on June 27, 1375 between England and France to end hostilities in the Hundred Years' War for a year, is extended by agreement to June 24, 1377.
- March 31 – Pope Gregory XI excommunicates all members of the government of the Republic of Florence, and places the city under an interdict.

=== April–June ===
- April 28 – The Good Parliament, so called because its members attempt to reform the corrupt Royal Council, begins in England .
- May 3 – Olav IV Haakonsson is elected King Oluf II of Denmark, following the death of his grandfather, Valdemar IV, in 1375.
- June 7 – The day before his death, Prince Edward of Wales, heir to the English throne and known as "The Black Prince" summons his father, King Edward III, and brother, John of Gaunt, and makes them swear to uphold the claim to the throne of his son Richard. Edward is the first "English" Prince of Wales (as opposed to Welsh) not to become King of England.
- June 10 – Wenceslaus the Idle, son of Charles IV, Holy Roman Emperor, is elected King of the Romans by the prince-electors.
- June 18 – Saint Catherine of Siena, now the Roman Catholic patron saint of Italy, visits Pope Gregory XI in Avignon in France, to attempt to persuade him to make peace with Florence, and move the Papacy back to Rome.

=== July–September ===
- July 6 –
  - The Swiss city of Basel is placed under an imperial ban by the Habsburg dynasty's Leopold III, Duke of Austria because of the February 26 riot.
  - Wenceslaus the Idle is crowned King of the Romans at a ceremony in the Aachen Cathedral.
- July 10 – The Good Parliament is dissolved (at this time, it is the longest Parliament to have sat in England).
- August 12 – With the help of the Genoese, Byzantine co-emperor Andronicus IV Palaeologus invades Constantinople and dethrones his father, John V Palaeologus, as co-emperor. John V Palaeologus is taken prisoner.
- September 13 – Pope Gregory XI departs from Avignon in France to begin his journey to Rome in an attempt to make peace between the Republic of Florence and the Papal States.
- September – John of Gaunt summons religious reformer John Wyclif to appear before the Royal Council.

=== October–December ===
- October 7 – King Edward III of England makes out his Last Will and Testament, formally declaring his grandson Prince Richard as his successor, describing him as "Next we give and leave to our future heir, on whom may God confer his saving Grace, Richard, namely the son of Edward of honoured memory lately prince of Wales our firstborn son".
- October 12 – Pope Gregory XI and several cardinals of the Roman Catholic Church depart on a ship from the port of Marseille in France, and encounter severe storms before arriving in Genoa. He will finally arrive in Rome on January 17, 1377.
- October 28 – Pope Gregory XI and his cardinals sail out of the Bay of Genoa toward Corneto. Several cardinals become seriously ill, including Cardinal de Narbonne, who disembarks at Pisa and dies there.
- November 20 – Richard of Bordeaux, son of the Black Prince, is created Prince of Wales in succession to his father.
- December 25 – John of Gaunt presents his nephew, Richard of Bordeaux, to the feudatories of the realm and swears to uphold Richard's right to succeed Edward III.

== Unknown date ==
- In Mexico, Acamapichtli becomes the first tlatoani (emperor) of Tenochtitlan, according to the Codex Aubin, reigning until 1395. However, the Codex Chimalpahin, his reign was from 1367 to 1387, and Codex Chimalpopoca lists his reign as being from 1350 to 1403.

== Births ==
- November 9 – Edmund Mortimer, English nobleman and rebel (d. c. 1409)
- date unknown
  - Gihwa, scholar in Korean Buddhism (d. 1433)
  - Sofia of Bavaria, queen consort of Bohemia (d. 1425)
  - Yusuf III, Sultan of Granada (d. 1417)

== Deaths ==
- January 24 – Richard FitzAlan, 10th Earl of Arundel, English military leader
- April 6 – Przecław of Pogorzela, Cardinal and Bishop of Wrocław (b. 1310)
- May 30 – Joan of Ponthieu, Dame of Epernon, French countess regent
- June 8 – Edward the Black Prince, son of King Edward III of England (b. 1330)
- July 22 – Simon Langham, Archbishop of Canterbury (b. 1310)
- September 30 – Adelaide of Vianden, German countess
