= Mikhail Glinsky =

Mikhail Glinsky may refer to:

- Mikhail Iosifovich Glinsky (1901–1991), Soviet general
- Michael Glinski (1460s–1534), Lithuanian / Russian nobleman
