= Agrippina Fedorovna Chelyadnina =

Russian noble and courtier

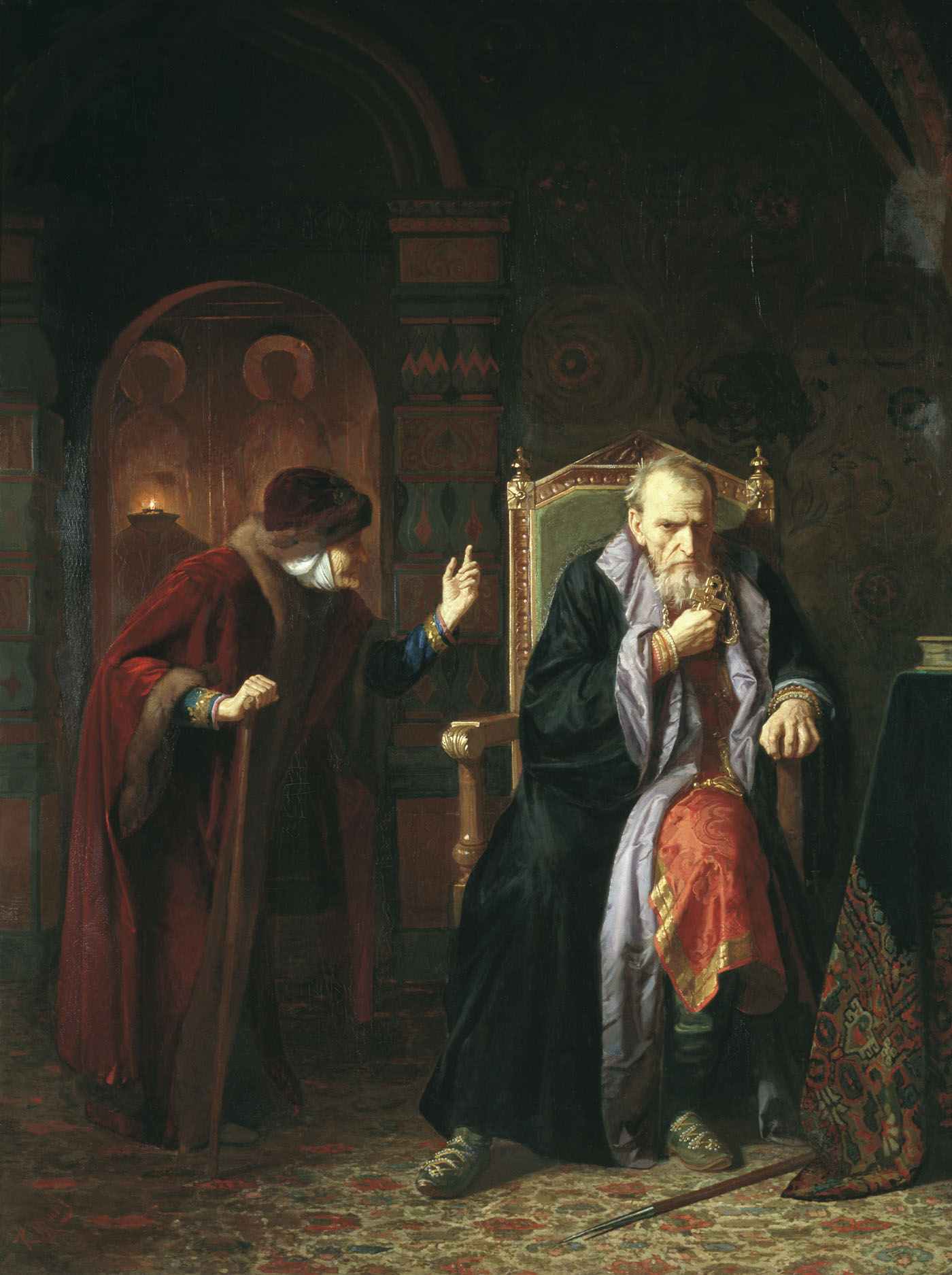
Ivan the Terrible and Agrippina, by Carl Wenig (1886)

Agrippina Fedorovna Chelyadnina (fl. 1538) was a Russian noble and courtier, the royal governess of Tsar Ivan the Terrible.

Agrippina was the daughter of Fyodor Vasilyevich 'Telepen' Obolensky, and sister of Ivan Fedorovich Telepnev-Obolensky who was a favourite of Elena Glinskaya.

She married a Boyar in the service of Vasili III of Moscow. The marriage was childless, as Fyodor died between 1516 and 1518. Due to the status of her husband and relatives, Agrippina enjoyed an elite position amongst other courtiers. She was appointed governess to Ivan in 1533, before Vasili's death, after which Elena took Agrippina's brother as her lover and ruled as regent.

After the death of Elena Glinskaya, 20 April 1538, boyars Ivan and Vasili Shuisky staged a coup, arresting Agrippina and her brother. She was exiled to Kargopol and forced to become a nun.
