= 1375 =

1375 in various calendars
- Gregorian calendar: 1375; MCCCLXXV
- Ab urbe condita: 2128
- Armenian calendar: 824; ԹՎ ՊԻԴ
- Assyrian calendar: 6125
- Balinese saka calendar: 1296–1297
- Bengali calendar: 781–782
- Berber calendar: 2325
- English Regnal year: 48 Edw. 3 – 49 Edw. 3
- Buddhist calendar: 1919
- Burmese calendar: 737
- Byzantine calendar: 6883–6884
- Chinese calendar: 甲寅年 (Wood Tiger); 4072 or 3865 — to — 乙卯年 (Wood Rabbit); 4073 or 3866
- Coptic calendar: 1091–1092
- Discordian calendar: 2541
- Ethiopian calendar: 1367–1368
- Hebrew calendar: 5135–5136
- Hindu calendars
- Vikram Samvat: 1431–1432
- Shaka Samvat: 1296–1297
- Kali Yuga: 4475–4476
- Holocene calendar: 11375
- Igbo calendar: 375–376
- Iranian calendar: 753–754
- Islamic calendar: 776–777
- Japanese calendar: Ōan 8 / Eiwa 1 (永和元年)
- Javanese calendar: 1288–1289
- Julian calendar: 1375; MCCCLXXV
- Korean calendar: 3708
- Minguo calendar: 537 before ROC 民前537年
- Nanakshahi calendar: −93
- Thai solar calendar: 1917–1918
- Tibetan calendar: ཤིང་ཕོ་སྟག་ལོ་ (male Wood-Tiger); 1501 or 1120 or 348 — to — ཤིང་མོ་ཡོས་ལོ་ (female Wood-Hare); 1502 or 1121 or 349

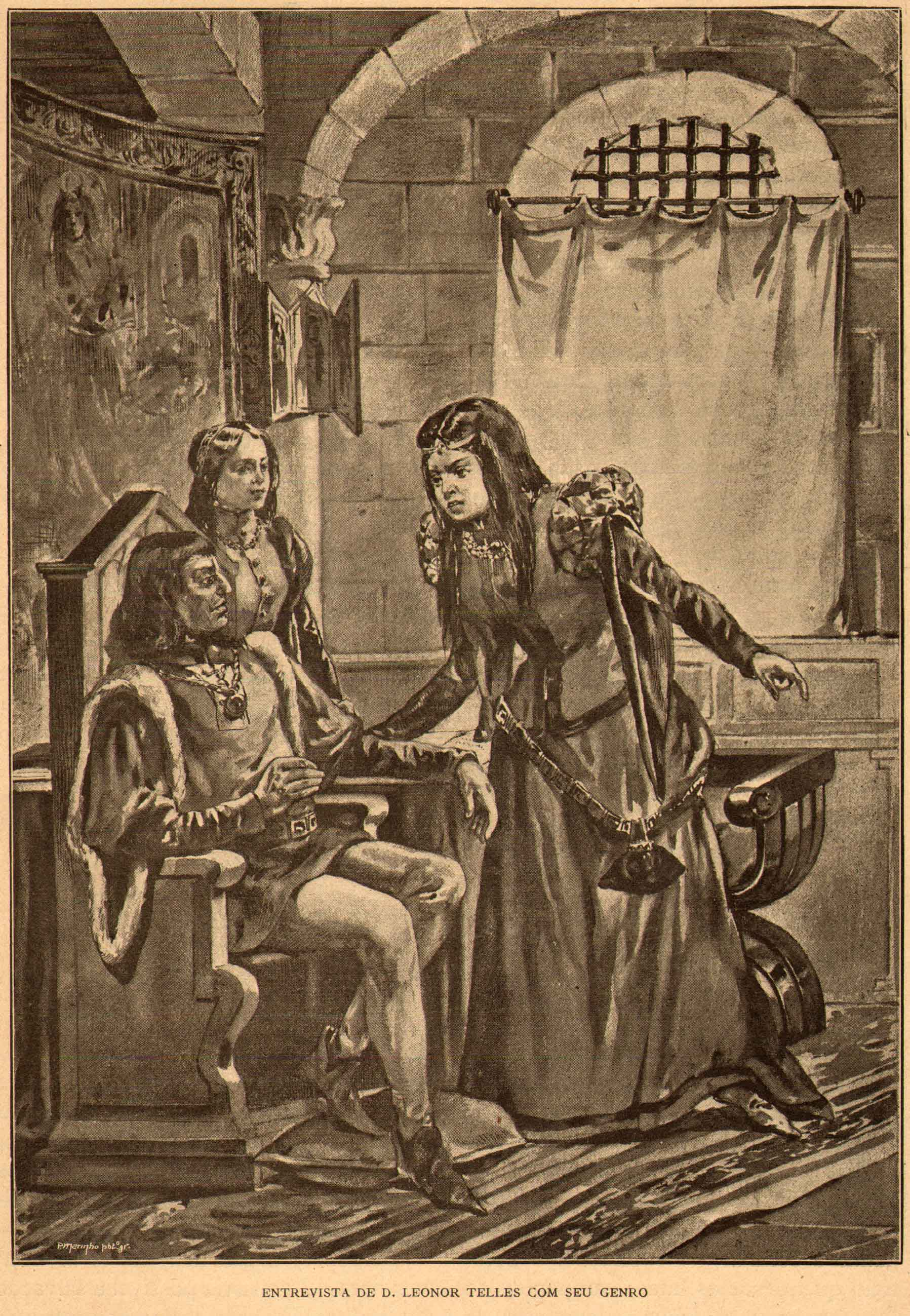
June 18: Prince Juan of Castile and Princess Leonor of Aragon are married by agreement of their fathers, a step toward the eventual unification of the kingdoms of Spain

Year 1375 (MCCCLXXV) was a common year starting on Monday of the Julian calendar.

== Events ==
=== January–March ===
- January 30 – (28th day of 12th month of Bunchu 3) Emperor Go-En'yū is enthroned in Kyoto as Emperor of the Northern Court, after having succeeded his father, Emperor Go-Kōgon, in 1374.
- February 7 – In what is Myanmar, King Swa Saw Ke of Ava declares that occupiers from the neighboring Shan State of Möng Mao have been driven out of the kingdom, and a monument is inscribed at the capital, Inwa.
- February 13 – Pope Gregory XI issues the bull Debitum pastoralis offici, establishing a second ecclesiastical province in the Kingdom of Poland, the Roman Catholic Archdiocese of Halych.
- March 4 – Under an agreement between King Lajos of Hungary and Leopold III, Duke of Austria, Ludvik's one-year-old daughter, Princess Jadwiga, is betrothed to Leopold's four-year-old son Wilhelm of Habsburg.
- March 31 – In the Principality of Nizhny Novgorod-Suzdal (now part of Russia), the Grand Prince Dmitry of Suzdal oversees the massacre of the Tatar prisoners of war who had been captured during the Blue Horde's unsuccessful attempt by Sary-Aka to incite a rebellion against the principality's domination by Moscow.

=== April–June ===
- April 14 – The Mamluks from Egypt complete their conquest of the Armenian Kingdom of Cilicia. King Levon V is imprisoned for several years in Cairo, until a ransom is paid by King John I of Castile.
- April 21 – At Kalaburagi (now apart of the Indian state of Karnataka, Mujahid Shah succeeds his father, Mohammed Shah I, as ruler of the Bahmani Sultanate in the Deccan Plateau of southern India. A war begins two months later when the Sulatn Mujahid begins a fight against the neighboring Vijayanagara Empire
- May 1 – The third war between the Kingdom of Hungary and the Ottoman Empire as the 40,000 Hungarian troops, led by King Lajos of Hungary depart from Várad (now Oradea in Romania) and march into the Principality of Wallachia, whose ruler, Vladislav, has recently changed his alliance from Hungary to the Ottoman sultanate.
- May 4 – Simon Sudbury, the Catholic Bishop of London becomes the new Archbishop of Canterbury, leader of the Roman Catholic Church in the Kingdom of England, upon his appointment by Pope Gregory XI following the death almost a year earlier of the Archbishop William Whittlesey. Sudbury will preside for six years until his assassination in 1381.
- June 18 – In Spain, the eldest son of Henry II of Castile, Prince Juan of Trastámara marries the daughter of King Pedro of Aragon, Princess Leonor of Aragon as part of a peace agreement between the Kingdom of Castile and the Kingdom of Aragon. The marriage takes place at Soria, a town on the Douro river, the border between the two kingdoms. Juan will become King of Aragon in 1379 and Leonor the Queen consort.
- June 26 – Shortly after an earthquake in Japan, the Southern Court, ruled by Emperor Chōkei, changes the name of the Bunchū era, and the Tenju era begins.
- June 27 – Hundred Years' War: The English, weakened by the plague, lose so much ground to the French that they agree to sign the Treaty of Bruges, leaving them with only the coastal towns of Calais, Bordeaux and Bayonne.

=== July–September ===
- July 3 – The fortress of St. Sauveur le Viconte surrenders to a French fleet commanded by Jean de Vienne after a siege of more than six months.
- July 15 – During a plague in England, Simon Sudbury, Archbishop of Canterbury, sends a call for prayers to all churches, asking that believers "pour out unceasing prayers to The Most High for the cessation of this pestilence or epidemic and for the tranquility of peace, and to entreat mercy of Him with a humble heart," and adds "For prayer is an immediate defence, an immolation of the enemy, a solace to angels and a pleasing sacrifice to God, and assiduous appeals for mercy made by a just man very often carry great power."
- July 24 – Despite an appeal by Pope Gregory XI to cities in Tuscany to remain allied to the Catholic Church in a war with the Republic of Florence, the city of Pisa enters a defensive alliance with the Visconti family of Florence and supplies are sent by Florence for lance-bearing soldiers, as well as archers and infantry as part of a federation of Tuscan communes.
- August 8 – In Switzerland, the Roman Catholic bishop Guichard Tavel becomes a victim of the long-standing feud between the Tavel family and the de la Tour family. Antoine de la Tour and a group of soldiers enter the Soie Castle (now in the Canton of Valais), ostensibly to arrest Bishop Tavel. The la Tour gang drags the Bishop up to the top of the castle walls and throws him off to his death.
- September 4 – In the Duchy of Aquitaine, now part of France but at the time ruled by the King of England, the civic leaders of the town of Soule sign an agreement with Gaston III of Foix, popularly known as "Fébus", for his protection against raids from John of Gaunt.

=== October–December ===
- October 24 – Margaret I of Denmark becomes Regent of Denmark after the death of her father, Valdemar IV.
- November 12 – At Brno, now in the Czech Republic, Jobst of Luxembourg (Jošt Lucemburský) becomes the new margrave of Moravia, succeeding his father Jan Jindřich Lucemburský.
- December 2 – With the threat of the Russian Orthodox believers of the Grand Duchy of Lithuania being converted to the Roman Catholic Church, the Ecumenical Patriarch of Constantinople, Philotheos Kokkinos, creates the Orthodox metropolis of Lithuania with the approval of the other bishops at the Council of Constantinople. Philotheos consecrates Cyprian as the first Orthodox Metropolitan of Lithuania and designates Cyprian will be the successor to Alexius II, Metropolitan of Kiev and all Russia.
- December 20 – Pope Gregory XI designates nine new cardinals at Avignon, having appointed 21 new cardinals to supplement the 20 who had been living when he became Pope. Among those selected are Pedro Martínez de Luna y Pérez de Gotor, who becomes the second antipope at Avignon during the Western Schism between Avignon and Rome.
- December 25 – Queen Joanna of Naples signs a marriage contract for the fourth time, agreeing to be married to Otto, Duke of Brunswick-Grubenhagen. Queen Joanna's first three husbands (Andrew of Calabria, King Louis I of Naples and the Margrave James IV of Majorca) had all died, in 1345, 1362 and 1375, respectively.
- December 28 – King Edward III summons the English Parliament to assemble at Westminster on April 28, 1376.

=== Date unknown ===
- The Grand Duchy of Moscow and Tver sign a truce. Tver agrees to help Moscow fight the Blue Horde.
- Presumed death of Tenoch, ruler of the Mexica; he is succeeded by Acamapichtli who becomes first tlatoani (ruler) of the Aztecs of Tenochtitlan and founder of the Aztec imperial dynasty.
- Petru succeeds as Voivode (ruler) of Moldavia (modern-day Moldova & eastern Romania). He is the first ruler from the dynastic House of Bogdan.
- Coluccio Salutati is appointed Chancellor of Florence.
- The Russian town of Kostroma is destroyed by the ushkuynik pirates from Novgorod.
- Heirin-ji Temple is founded near Edo.
- In Nanjing, capital of Ming dynasty China, a bureau secretary of the Ministry of Justice, Ru Taisu, sends a 17,000 character-long memorial to the throne, to be read aloud to the Hongwu Emperor. By the 16,370th character, the emperor has been offended by several passages, and has Ru Taisu summoned to court and flogged for the perceived insult. The next day, having had the remaining characters read to him, he likes four of Ru's recommendations, and instates these in reforms. Ru is nevertheless castigated for having forced the emperor to hear thousands of characters before getting to the part with true substance. The last 500 characters are elevated in court as the model-type memorial that all officials should aspire to create while writing their own.
- Approximate date – Battle of Gardiki: The Principality of Achaea defeats the Despotate of the Morea.

== Births ==
- October – Joanna of Aragon, Countess of Foix, Aragonese throne claimant (d. 1407)
- date unknown
  - Richard of Conisburgh, 3rd Earl of Cambridge (approximate date; d. 1415)
  - Nicolas Grenon, French composer (approximate date; d. 1456)
  - Lan Kham Deng, King of Lan Xang 1416–1428 (d. 1428)
  - Johannes Abezier (1375–1424), Roman Catholic religious and political leader of the Teutonic Knights, over Polish territory

== Deaths ==
- April 21 – Elisabeth of Meissen, Burgravine consort of Nuremberg (b. 1329)
- October 19 – Cansignorio della Scala, Lord of Verona (b. 1340)
- April 16 – John Hastings, 2nd Earl of Pembroke, English nobleman and soldier (b. 1347)
- May 16 – Liu Bowen, Chinese military strategist, officer, statesman and poet (b. 1311)
- July 5 – Charles III of Alençon, French archbishop (b. 1337)
- September 1 – Philip of Valois, Duke of Orléans (b. 1336)
- October 24 – King Valdemar IV of Denmark
- November 12 – John Henry, Margrave of Moravia (b. 1322)
- December 21 – Giovanni Boccaccio, Italian writer (b. 1313)
- date unknown
  - Adityawarman, king of Malayapura
  - Margaret Drummond, dowager queen consort of Scotland (b. c.1340)
  - Lațcu, voivode of Moldavia
  - Tenoch, Mexica ruler
