= Joseph-Volokolamsk Monastery =

Coordinates: 56°10′19″N 36°5′51″E

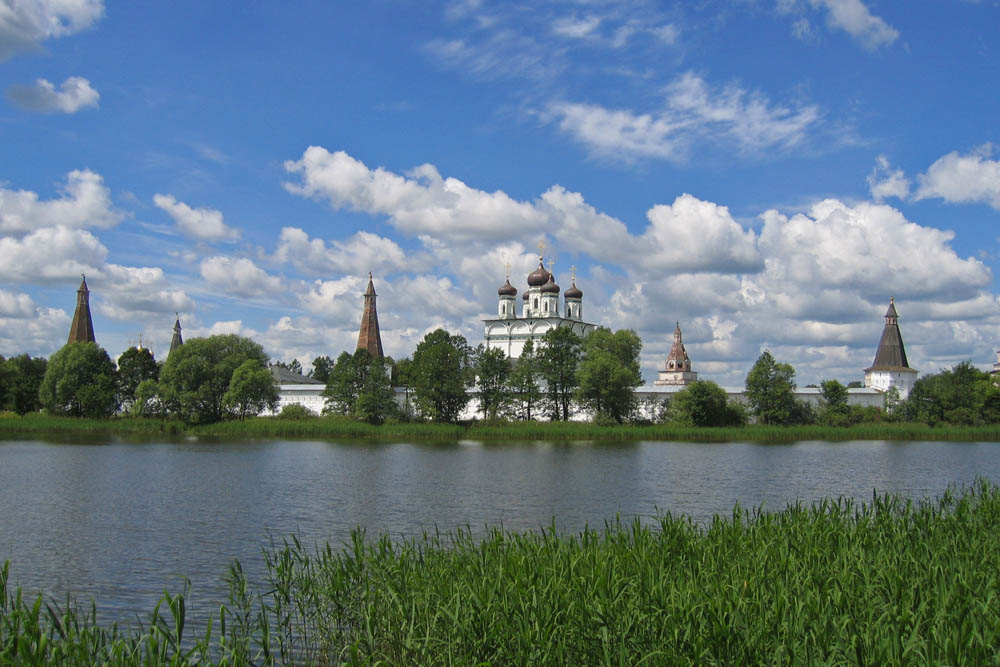
View of the monastery from across an adjacent lake.

Joseph Volokolamsk Monastery (Иосифо-Волоколамский монастырь, Волоцкий Успенский Иосифов монастырь in Russian) is a monastery for men, located 17 km northeast of Volokolamsk, Moscow Oblast. In the 15th and 16th centuries, it rivaled the Trinity as the most authoritative and wealthy monastery in Russia. It was frequently referred to as lavra, although there was no official corroboration of that status.

== Early history ==
Joseph Volokolamsk Monastery was founded in 1479 by Joseph Volotsky. Originally under the jurisdiction of the archbishop of Novgorod, following a dispute with the local prince, Fedor Borisovich of Volokolamsk, Joseph appealed to grand Prince Vasilii III and the metropolitan to take the monastery under direct control. This led to a dispute between Joseph, the grand prince, and the metropolitan on the one hand, and Archbishop Serapion I of Novgorod (r. 1506–1509) on the other, since according to canon law a monastery could not be removed from a bishop's authority without his permission and Serapion had clearly not granted permission. The grand prince and metropolitan convened a church council, headed by Joseph's brother, the bishop of Rostov, which deposed Serapion and confined him to the Troitse-Sergeev Lavra, where he died in 1516.

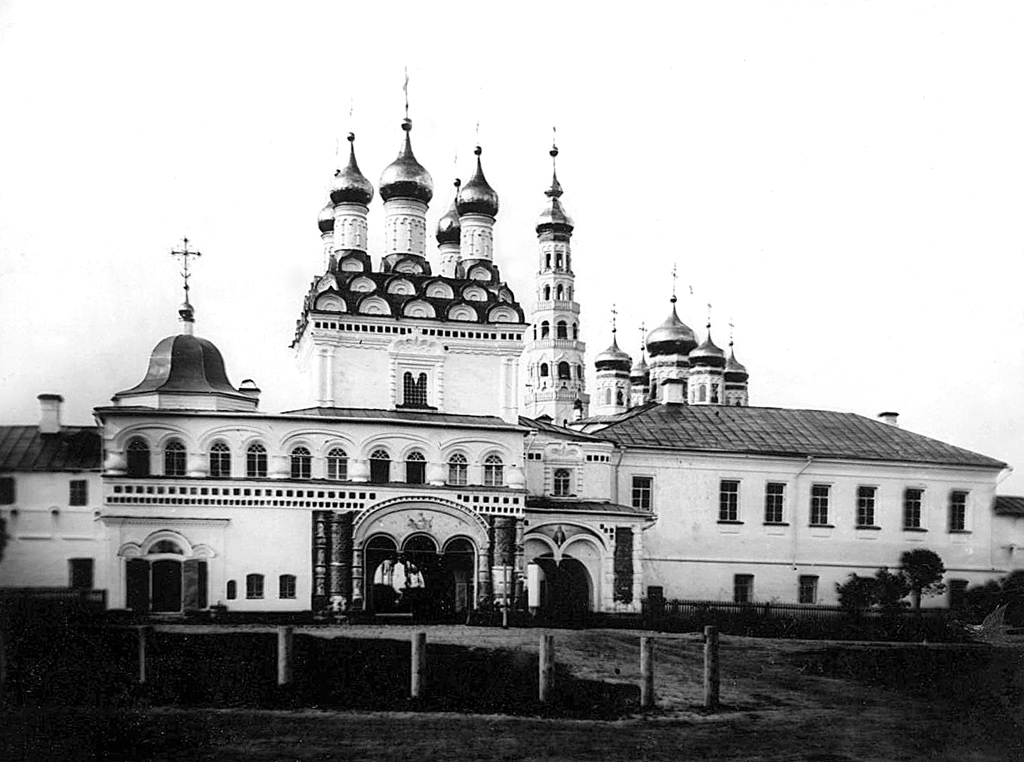
The monastery in 1900

Over the next several decades, the monastery became the center of his disciples, or Josephinians, and played a key role in the political and ecclesiastic life of the 16th-century Russia. It was also a stronghold of struggle against the opponents of church landownership and heretics. Its vaults were used as a prison for dissenters. The famous inmates included Maximus the Greek (who spent 14 years there), Vassian Patrikeyev, Feodor Kuritsyn, Feodosii, Archbishop of Novgorod (1542–1551) who helped in compiling the Velikaia Mineia Chetii of Makarii and helped draw up documents for the Stoglav Council, Metropolitan Daniel, and Tsar Basil IV. Joseph Volotsky, Metropolitan Daniel, Archbishop Feodosii, and Malyuta Skuratov are among many notables buried within monastery walls.

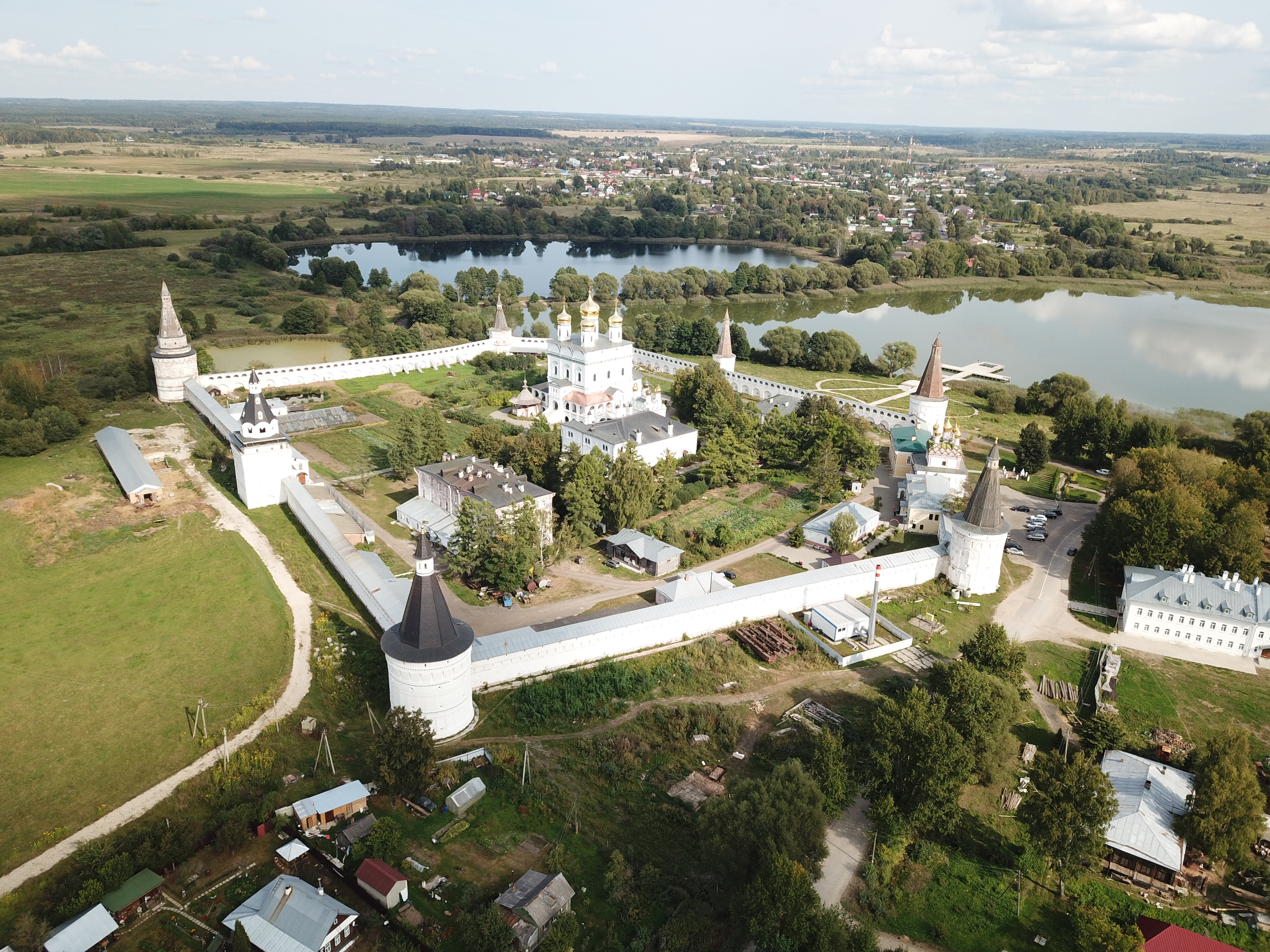
Bird's-eye view.

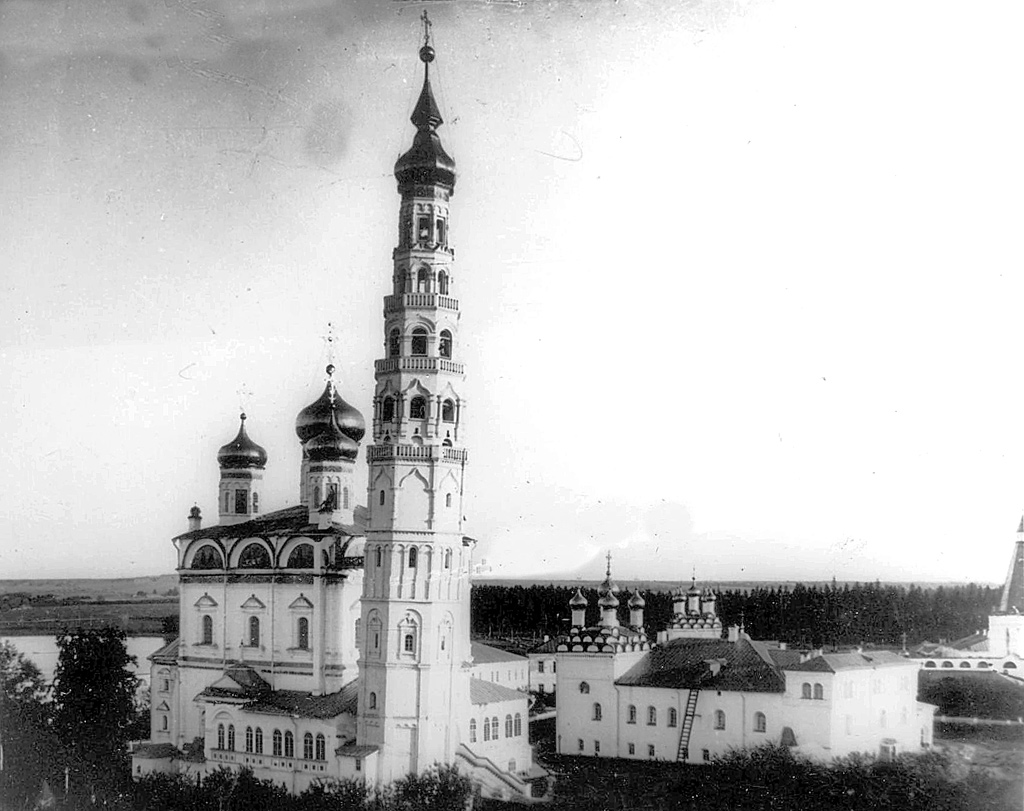
The monastery's belltower was destroyed by German forces in WWII

In the 1560s, Joseph Volokolamsk Monastery was the second largest landowner in Russia, with more than 30,000 desyatinas of arable lands in its possession. Several smaller priories, dependent on the monastery, were founded on these lands. Within the principal cloister, three ponds were kept full of fresh water. After the Assumption Cathedral was constructed in brick in 1486, the great icon-painter Dionisius was summoned to embellish its walls with frescoes. An enormous octagonal bell-tower was constructed in 9 tiers in the 1490s. At that time, it was the tallest structure in Russia. Its design heralded that of Ivan the Great Bell Tower in the Moscow Kremlin.

During the Time of Troubles, Joseph Volokolamsk Monastery was actively engaged in helping the government of Basil IV in his struggle against Ivan Bolotnikov's rebels. The Polish hetman Roman Rożyński lost his life besieging the monastery in 1611. After the siege, the monks captured a lot of Polish cannons, which were later used for festive fire works.

== Re-construction ==
At the end of the 17th century, the monastery was reconstructed in the fashionable Naryshkin style. The new walls, completed by 1688, featured nine sharp-coned towers of stone. A golden-domed church was built over the main gates to the monastery in 1679. A church of similar design was added in 1682 to the spacious refectory, currently the oldest building in the complex, dating from 1504. The new Assumption Cathedral replaced the old one between 1682 and 1689. Its exterior was elaborately decorated with coloured tiles, and a marvellously carved iconostasis was installed in the interior.

== Recent history ==
After the October Revolution of 1917, Joseph-Volokolamsk Monastery was turned into a museum. The Soviet authorities destroyed all the bells and took most of the icons to Moscow. During World War II, the Nazi army seriously damaged the cloister and blew up its famous bell-tower. Although the churches have been subsequently restored, the bell-tower remains a major loss sustained by Russian art during the war.

== Gallery ==
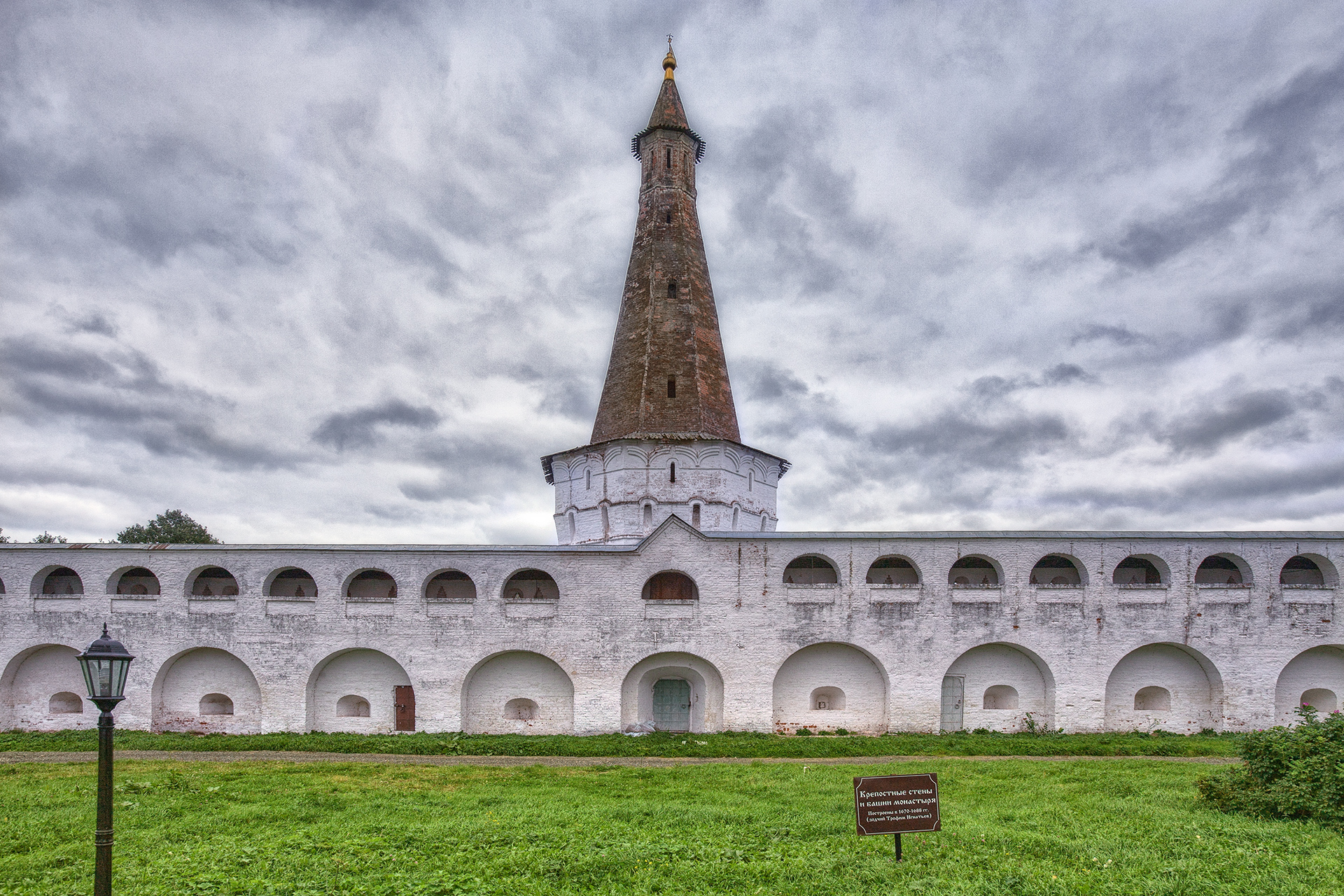
Chasovaya tower

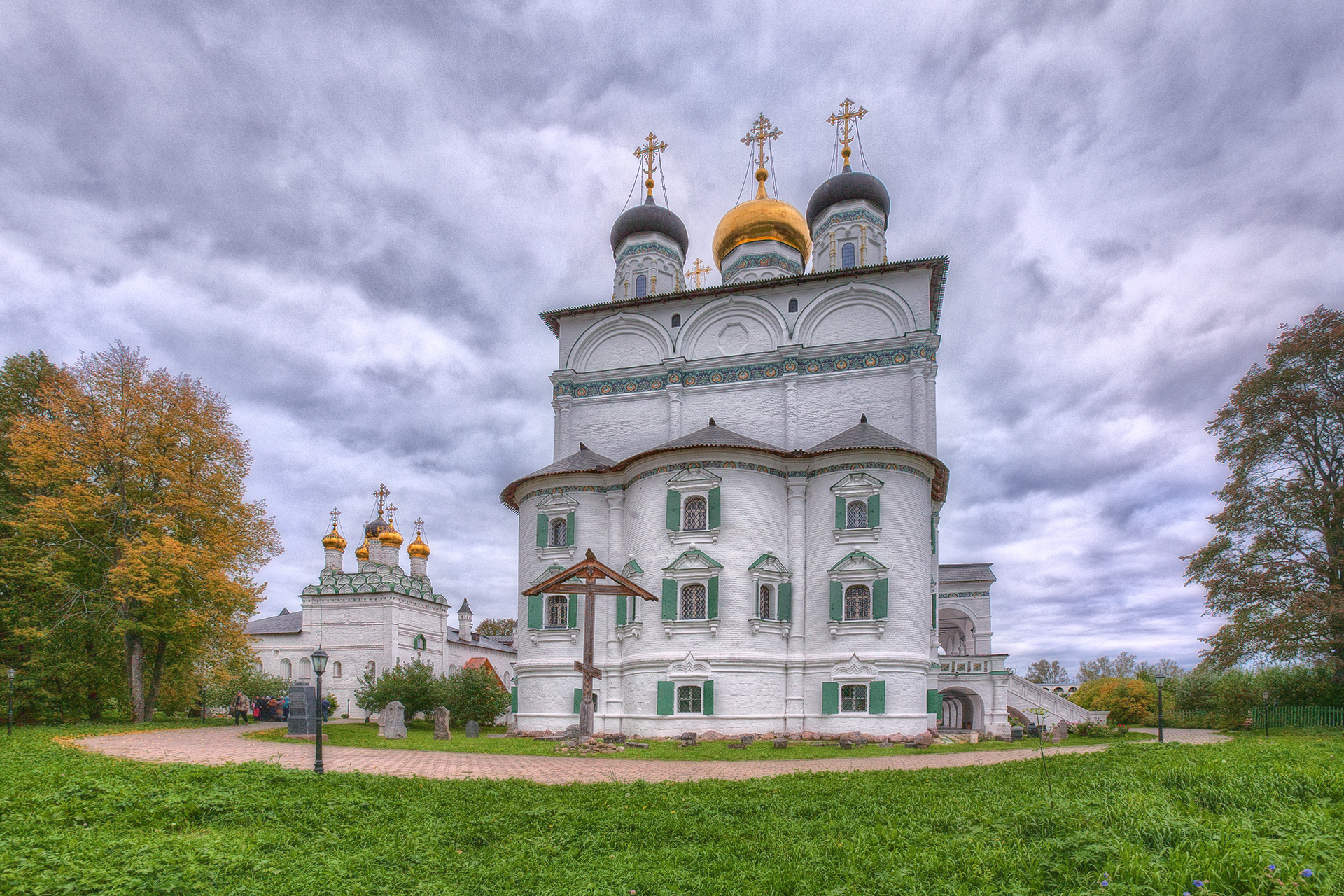
Refectory (1504, 1682)

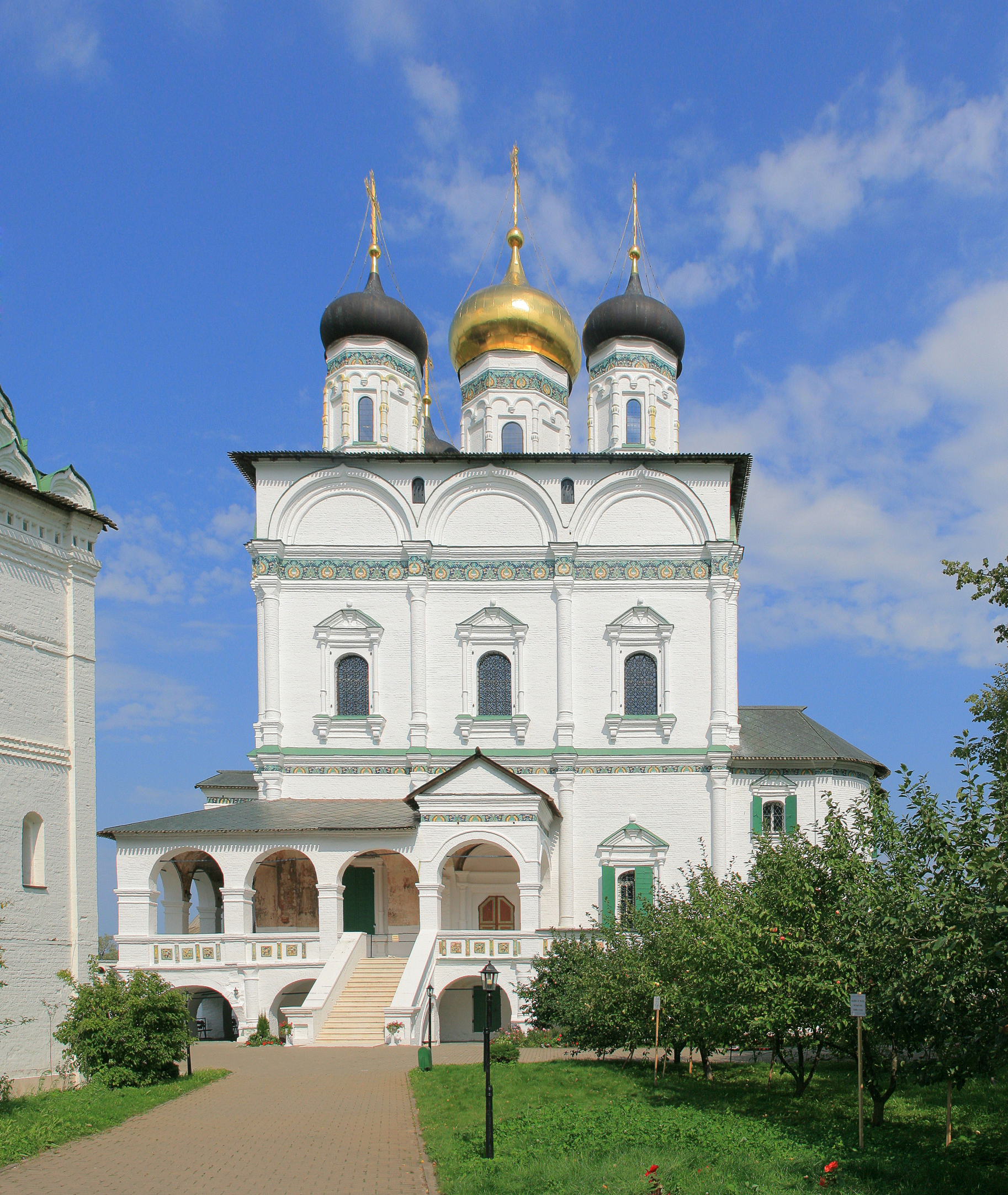
Katholikon (1680s)

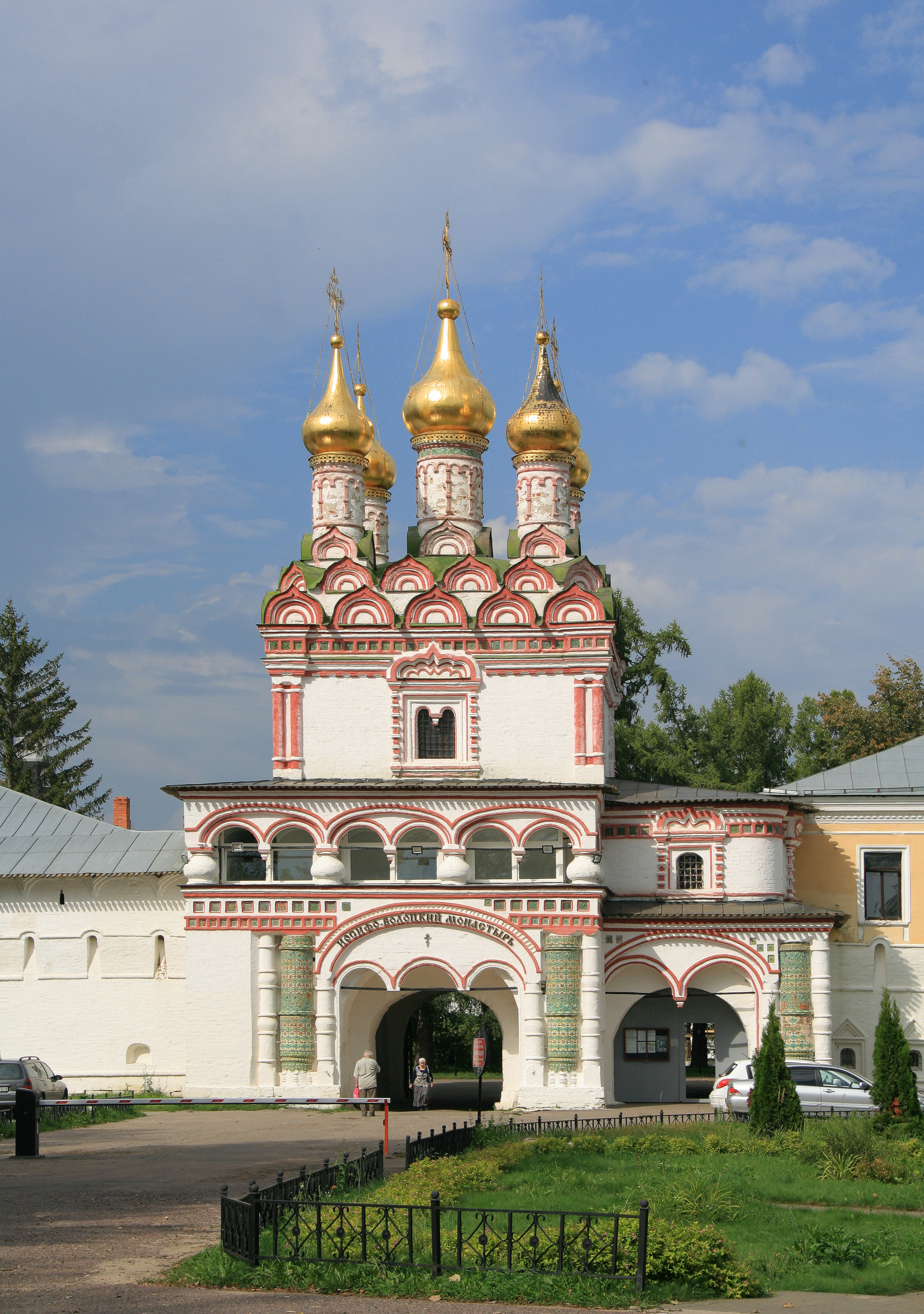
Gate church

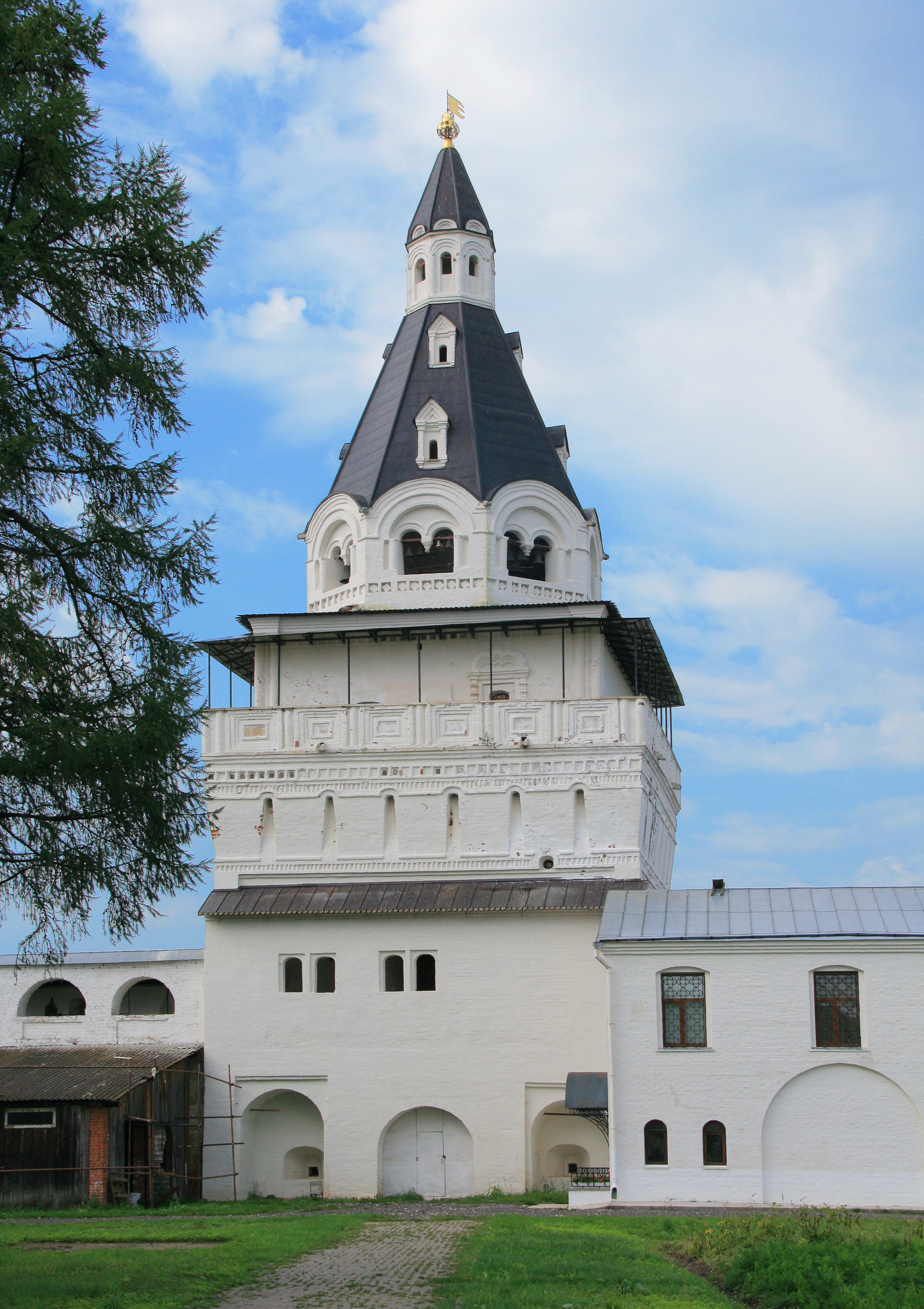
Germanova tower

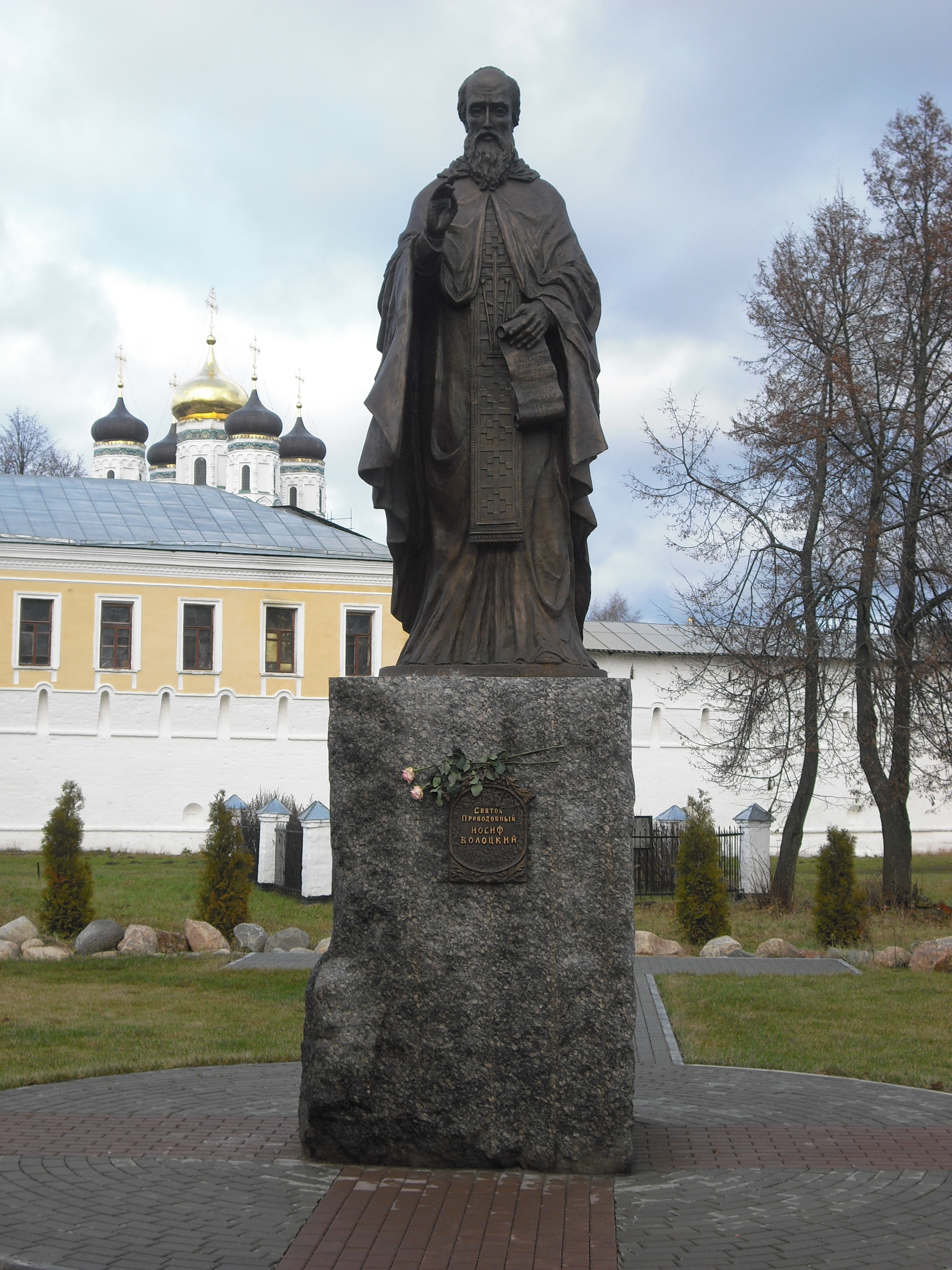
Monument to Joseph Volotsky

== Other burials ==
- Malyuta Skuratov
