= Joasaphus, Metropolitan of Moscow =

Metropolitan of Moscow from 1539 to 1542

Joasaphus
- Metropolitan of Moscow and all Russia
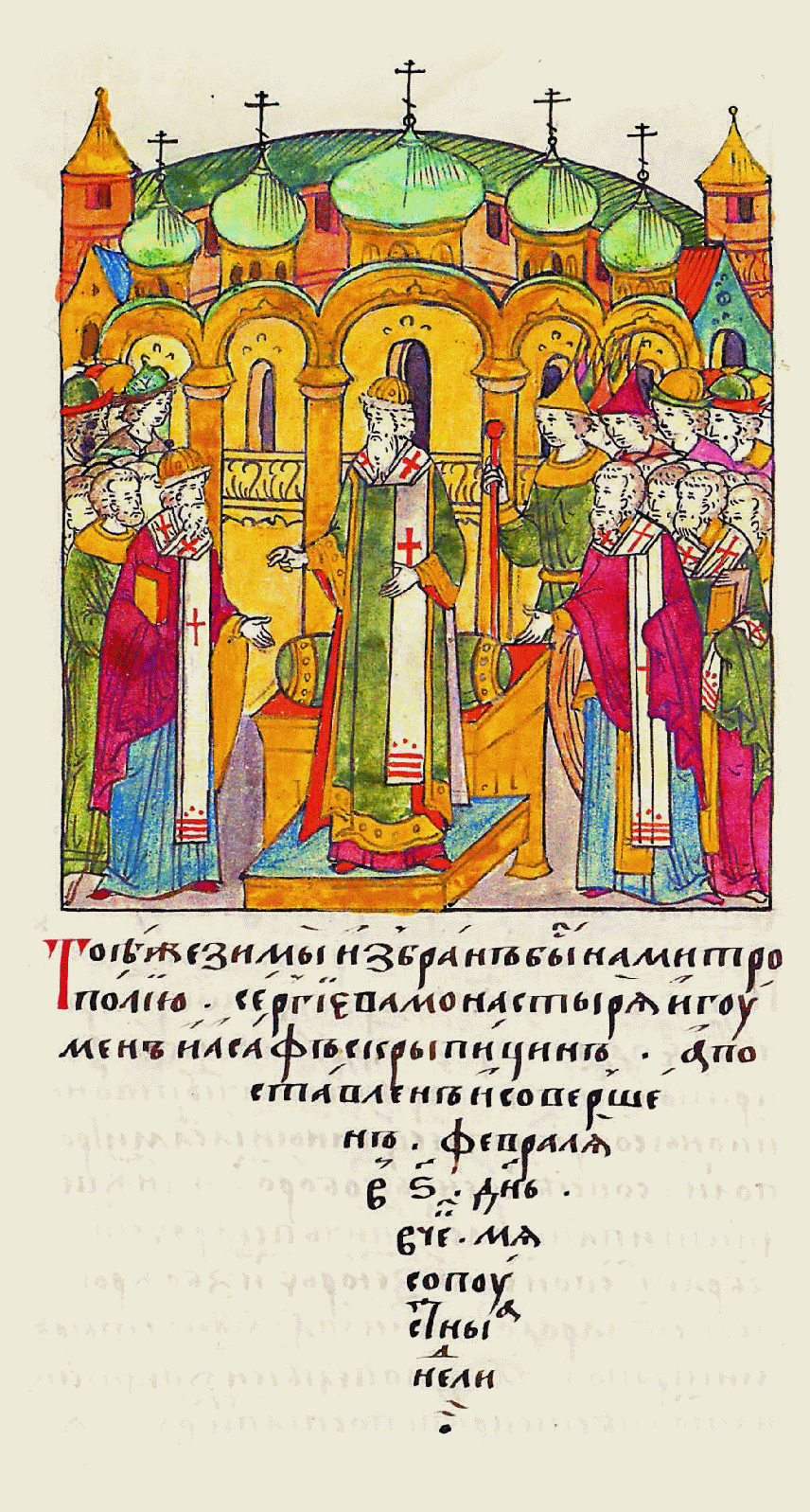
- Miniature from the Illustrated Chronicle of Ivan the Terrible
- Church: Russian Orthodox Church
- See: Moscow
- Installed: 1539
- Term ended: 1542
- Predecessor: Daniel
- Successor: Macarius

Personal details
- Died: 1555 or 1556

Joasaphus Skripitsyn (also spelled Ioasaph or Joasaph; Russian: Иоасаф (Скрипицын); died 1555 or 1556) was the Metropolitan of Moscow and all Rus', serving as the primate of the Russian Orthodox Church from 1539 to 1542. He was the ninth metropolitan in Moscow appointed without the approval of the Ecumenical Patriarch of Constantinople, a break from the earlier tradition that had required such information.

Joasaph is known to have authored a number of theological works.

== Biography ==
Joasaphus was first a monk and then hegumen at the Trinity-St. Sergius Lavra (since 1529). He enjoyed the favor of Grand Prince Vasili III. After Metropolitan Daniel had been deposed at the church sobor (council) of 1539, Joasaph was elected Metropolitan of Moscow just three days later, on 5 February 1539.

He is known to have opposed the supporters of the Josephites or non-possessors, and favored the opponents of monastic landownership. Joasaph was the one to solicit young Ivan IV's forgiveness for the disgraced Belskys and prince Vladimir of Staritsa and render support for Maximus the Greek.

During the regency of Grand Duchess Elena Glinskaya, in the first five years of the reign of Ivan IV (1533–1538), Joasaph managed to keep his influence at the royal court, but in 1542, Joasaph fell into disgrace and was exiled to the Kirillo-Belozersky Monastery and then transferred to the Trinity-St. Sergius Lavra in 1547, where he would remain until his death on 27 July 1555.

== Sources ==
- "Иоасаф (Скрипицын)" . Brockhaus and Efron Encyclopedic Dictionary (in Russian). 1906.

Preceded by Daniel	Metropolitan of Moscow and all Rus'; 1539–1542	Succeeded by Macarius
