= Ana Jakšić =

Serbian and Russian noblewoman (died c. 1553)

Anna Glinskaya
- Анна Глинская; Ана Глинска
- Born: Ana Jakšić c. 1473; Serbia
- Died: c. 1553
- Spouse: Vasili Lvovich Glinsky
- Children: 3, including Elena Glinskaya
- Father: Stefan Jakšić
- Relatives: Jelena Jakšić (sister)
- Family: Jakšić

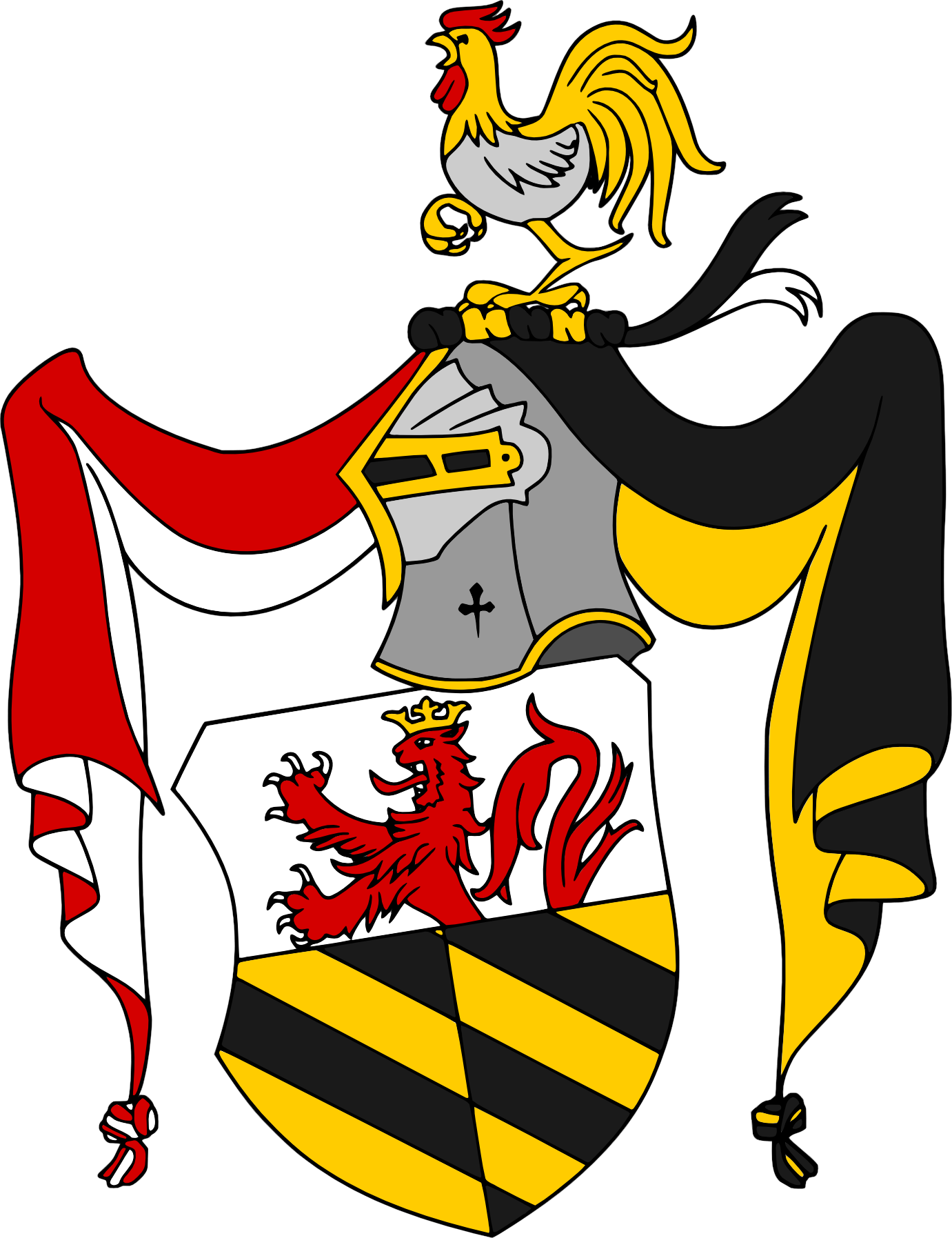
Coat of arms of the Jakšić noble family

Anna Glinskaya (Russian: Анна Глинская; Serbian: Ана Глинска, romanized: Ana Glinska; née Jakšić; (Note: Serbian: Јакшић; Russian: Якшич, romanized: Yakshich) died c. 1553) was a Serbian and Russian noblewoman. She was the daughter of Serbian voivode Stefan Jakšić (d. 1489) from the Jakšić family. Her sister Jelena Jakšić (d. after 1529) was the titular despotissa of Serbia.

Anna was married to prince Vasili Lvovich Glinsky (d. 1515), member of the House of Glinsky, the brother of the powerful prince Michael Glinski (d. 1534). Anna and Vasili had several children, including princes Yuri Vasilyevich Glinsky (d. 1547) and Michael Vasilyevich Glinsky (d. 1559). Their daughter Elena Glinskaya (d. 1538) married the grand prince and sovereign Vasili III of Russia (d. 1533). Through their daughter, Anna was the grandmother of Ivan IV (d. 1584), the first crowned tsar of all Russia.

== Regency and aftermath ==
During the regency of her daughter Elena Glinskaya from 1533 until 1538, Anna is said to have wielded influence over affairs of the Russian state. After the death of her daughter, Ana and her sons, uncles of the young tsar Ivan, were removed from influence. When her grandson Ivan IV was declared of age and the regency terminated, Anna and her sons returned to favor, securing influence over him during his early reign. They actively participated in the coronation of Ivan in 1547. The tsar granted them a principality and allowed for a reprisal of their former opponents, which were carried out "on the orders of Prince Michael Glinski and his mother Anna" rather than the tsar himself.

The influence of Anna and her sons created public hatred toward them, and when a fire destroyed large parts of Moscow in June 1547, the public demanded that Anna be turned over to them, and accused her of being a sorceress who had stolen the hearts of people and then flew over the city and sprinkled it with the water from the hearts, causing the fire. Anna and her son Michael were forced to flee and hide, while Anna's other son Yuri was killed by rioters. This incidents destroyed their power base, but despite that, they returned to court and their former position of influence. When they appeared in public to attend the wedding of Ivan's brother Yuri, the court nobility protested and convinced the Tsar to remove his grandmother and uncle from the court. After that, their influence has finally declined.

== See also ==
- Russia–Serbia relations
- Family tree of Russian monarchs

== Sources ==
- Payne, Robert; Romanoff, Nikita (2002) [1975]. Ivan the Terrible. New York: Cooper Square Press. ISBN 9780815412298.
- Pushkareva, Natalia (1997). Women in Russian History: From the Tenth to the Twentieth Century. Armonk, NY: M.E.Sharpe. ISBN 9780765632708.
