= Vasiliy Kirdyapa =

Russian noble, Prince of Suzdal and Gorodets

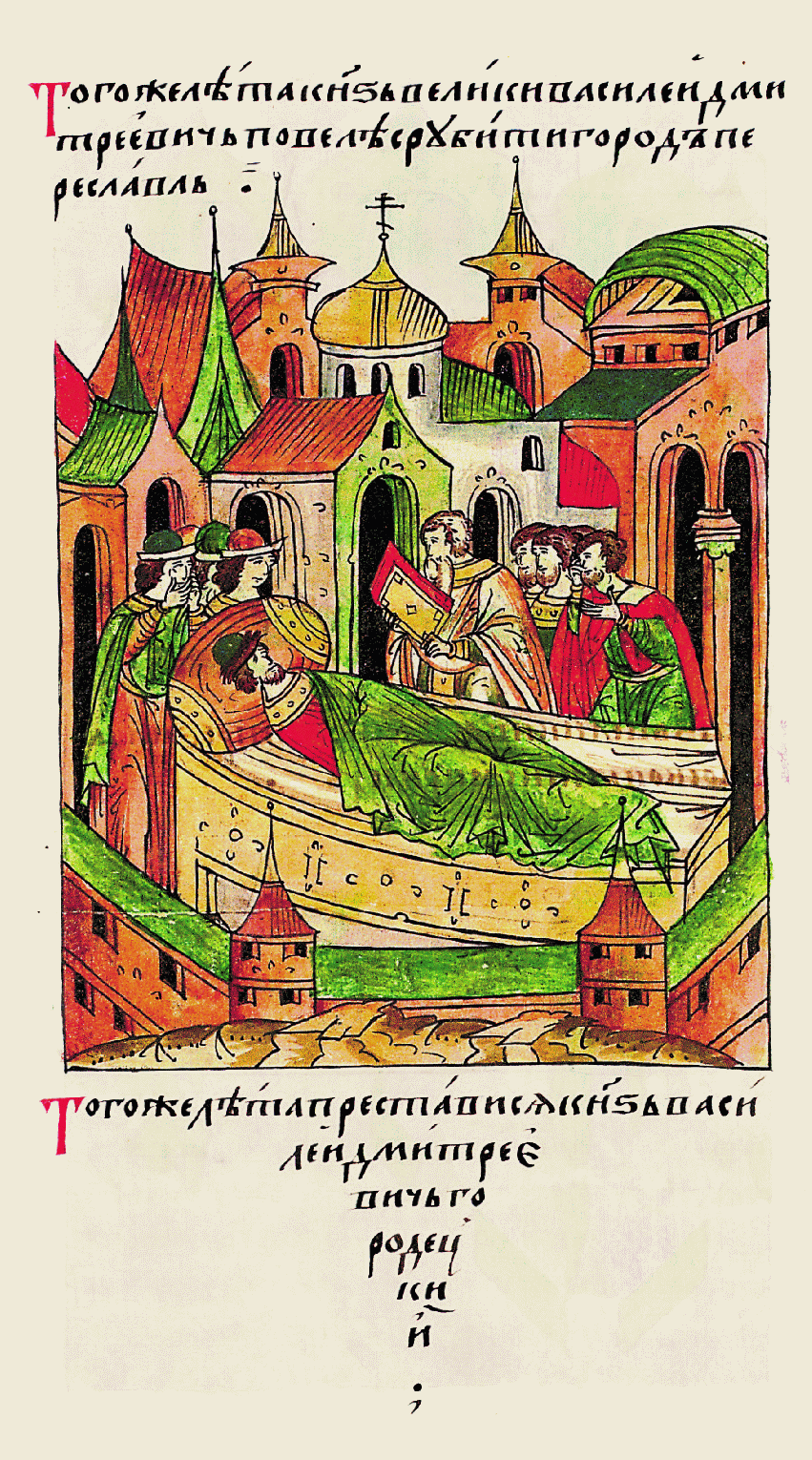
Facial Chronicle - b.12, p.014; Death of Vasily Demitryvich

Vasily Demitryvich Kirdyapa (Russian: Василий Дмитриевич Кирдяпа, c. 1350 – 1403) was the eldest son of Dmitri Konstantinovich of Suzdal and Nizhny Novgorod, a Prince of Suzdal (1364–1382) and Gorodets (1387–1403). He was the ancestor of the senior branch of a Rurikid noble family, and the Princes Shuysky.

== Life and work ==
In 1364, Vasily Kirdyapa and his brother Solomon were sent by their father, Dmitri Konstantinovich, to negotiate with their uncle Boris Konstantinovich, who at the time was the prince and ruler of the cities of Nizhny Novgorod, Gorodets, and Suzdal. After Boris refused his nephews entry to the city, Vasily proceeded to the Golden Horde where he got the jarlig, or "Khan's permission", for his father to rule over the Vladimir-Suzdal Principality. Dmitri yielded the jarlig to the Prince of Moscow, Dmitry Ivanovich Donskoy, and then, with the help of Donskoy's troops, drove Boris out of Nizhny Novgorod. He then took over Gorodets while Vasily became the ruler of Suzdal.

In 1367, Vasily joined his father and uncle in an attempt to repel Bulat-Temir, a marauder from the Golden Horde raiding the regions of the Principality of Suzdal—Nizhny Novgorod along the Volga river.

In 1370, Vasily was dispatched by his father to fight against Asan, the Prince of Kazan. There is a controversial claim that Vasily carried out a massacre of Sary-Aka's embassy, which was ordered by the commander of the Blue Horde Mamai in Nizhny Novgorod in 1374.

In 1376, Vasily and his younger brother Ivan Dmitriyevich conducted a plundering raid, along with troops from the principalities of Moscow and Nizhny Novgorod, on Kazan where they inflicted severe casualties and laid the city under a heavy siege.

In 1382, Vasiliy and Semyon joined the khan of the Blue Horde Tokhtamysh in his revenge raid on Moscow. The brothers convinced the defenders of the city to negotiate with the Tatars in exchange for a guarantee of their safety. The Tatars, however, killed the negotiators and stormed into the city. Moscow was razed, and almost 24,000 citizens were killed. Following that battle, Vasily was taken by Tokhtamysh to the Blue Horde and kept as a hostage. He attempted an escape in 1386, but was caught and brought back to be punished by the Khan.

In 1387, Tokhtamysh set Vasily free and granted him permission to rule over Gorodets. By that time his father, Dmitri Konstantinovich, had died and uncle Boris Konstantinovich again ruled over Nizhny Novgorod. With military assistance from Moscow, Vasily and Semyon forced their uncle out of Nizhny Novgorod for a second time.

In 1393, the Grand Prince of Moscow Vasily I of Moscow, a nephew of Vasily and Semyon, purchased the jarlig to rule Nizhny Novgorod from the Golden Horde. After driving Boris Konstantinovich out of Nizhny Novgorod, where he had established himself once again, the Grand Prince besieged Suzdal in an attempt to reclaim his uncle Vasily's throne. The outcome of the campaign is unclear, although some historians claim that Vasily and Semyon were able to bring Nizhny Novgorod back under their control. According to Vasily Tatishchev, Vasily I Dmitriyevich, in 1394, approached Nizhny Novgorod and forced Vasily and his brother Semyon to leave the city while granting them the city of Shuya. As the seniors among the Suzdal—Nizhny Novgorod princes, the brothers had been displeased with what they considered to be the lowly principality of Shuya. Reasoning to their dissatisfaction with the rule is suggested by reports that they attempted to reach the Golden Horde in 1394 to complain and retake Nizhny Novgorod. The Grand Prince sent troops to arrest the brothers, though they both managed to escape.

In 1403, Vasiliy Kirdyapa died in Gorodets.

== Descendants ==
Vasily Kirdyapa had four sons:

- Ivan Vasilievich Kirdyapin – a Prince of Suzdal and Nizhny Novgorod (1390—1417). He was buried in the Cathedral of St. Michael the Archangel in Nizhny Novgorod.
- Yuri-George Vasilievich Kirdyapin – a Prince of Nizhny Novgorod and Suzdal. He owned half of the city of Shuya. His descendants were named the Princes Shuysky. He is an ancestor of Vasili IV.
- Fyodor Vasilievich Kirdyapin – he was childless.
- Daniil Vasilievich – a Prince of Gorodets. He was killed in a battle near Lyskovo in 1412.
