= Shuysky =

Russian noble family of Boyars

House of Shuysky
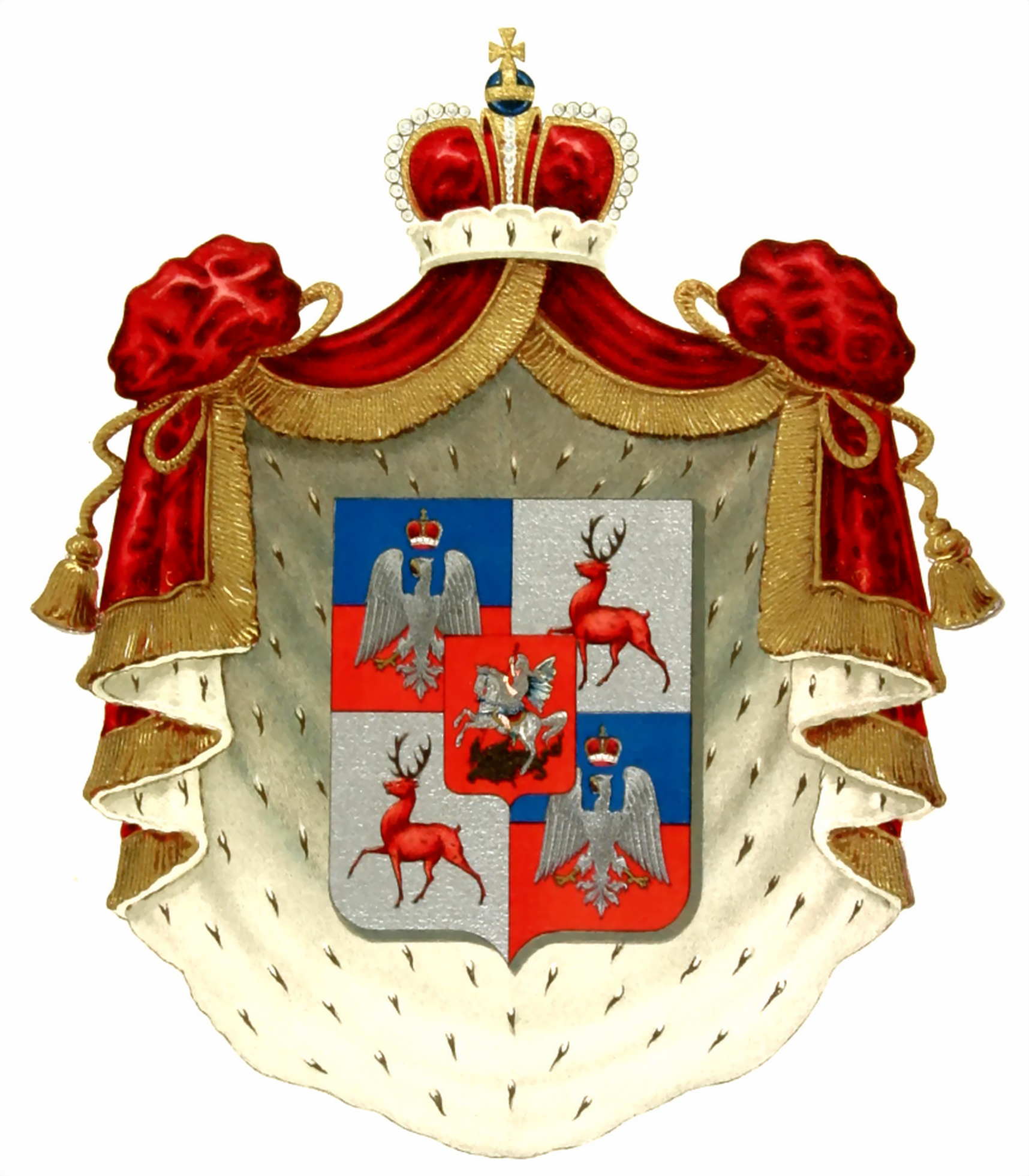
- Parent house: Rurikids
- Country: Suzdal–Nizhny Novgorod; Russia
- Founded: c. 1400
- Founder: Vasili IV
- Current head: ? (possibly extinct)
- Final ruler: Russia: Vasili IV (1606–1610)
- Titles: Tsar of Russia
- Deposition: Russia: 1610 (abdicated the throne, line extinct afterwards)
- Cadet branches: Shuisky-Glazaty; Barbashin; Shuisky-Gorbaty; Skopin-Shuisky; Szujski

The House of Shuysky (Shuisky; Russian: Шуйские, romanized: Shuyskiye) was a Russian family of boyars and tsars, a cadet branch of the Rurikids.

The surname is derived from the town of Shuya, of which the Shuiskys gained ownership in 1403. From 1606 to 1610, Vasili Shuisky ruled as tsar over Russia during the Time of Troubles.

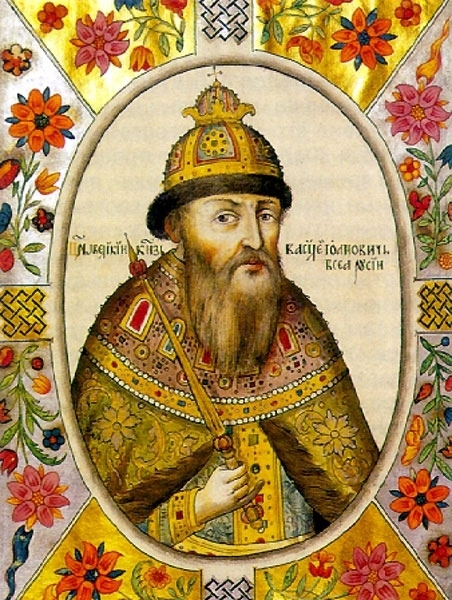
Tsar Vasili IV.

== Origins ==
The Shuiskys descended from the princely house of Suzdal, whose progenitor was either Andrey II of Vladimir, brother of Alexander Nevsky, or, according to other interpretations, Andrey of Gorodets, Nevsky’s son. Regardless of the interpretation, the Shuiskys shared a common ancestry with the ruling Muscovite line of the Rurikids, which descended from Daniel of Moscow, Alexander Nevsky’s son.

Dmitry of Suzdal, Prince of Suzdal and Nizhny Novgorod, died in 1383, leaving behind two sons: Vasiliy, called Kirdyapa, and Symeon. They became the progenitors of two branches of the Shuisky family. The younger branch, descended from Symeon, split into several lines (Shuisky-Glazaty, Barbashin, and Shuisky-Gorbaty), all of which died out in the 16th century. The main line of the Shuiskys descends from Vasiliy Kirdyapa.

The sons of Vasiliy Kirdyapa, Ivan and Yuri, fought to preserve the independence of their principality, but ultimately had to acknowledge Moscow’s supremacy. In return, they were granted the town and appanage principality of Shuya.

== Muscovy ==
Yuri left two sons, Vasiliy and Fedor, whose descendants played a prominent role at the Muscovite court. Among them, Vasiliy the Pale, son of Vasiliy, and Vasiliy the Mute, grandson of Fedor, stood out in particular.

Vasily the Pale was dispatched by Ivan III to govern Pskov and then Nizhny Novgorod (1478–80). The following year, he devastated Livonia and was sent as a governor to Novgorod. In 1487, he was recorded as leading a Russian contingent against Kazan.

=== The regency during the minority of Ivan IV ===
Vasily Shuysky the Mute was Grand Prince Vasily III's taciturn aide-de-camp who accompanied him on every military campaign and became an éminence grise of Muscovite politics. In 1517, he defeated forces of Poland and Lithuania under Konstanty Ostrogski as part of the 4th Muscovite-Lithuanian War. Six years later, Vasily the Mute led a Russian expedition along the Volga against Kazan. Upon the death of Vasily III's widow, Elena Glinskaya, he challenged the authority of Prince Ivan Belsky, procured his incarceration, married Anastasia of Kazan (Ivan III's granddaughter), and proclaimed himself regent for Vasily III's heir, the young Ivan IV, in 1538.

Vasily the Mute died later that year, and the power of the regency devolved upon his younger brother, Prince Ivan Vasilievich Shuysky, who began his rule by ousting Metropolitan Daniel from office and contriving the election of Joasaphus Skripitsin as the new head of the Russian Orthodox Church. He also released from prison his cousin, Prince Andrey Mikhailovich the Palisade, who had governed Yugoria and Nizhny Novgorod during Vasily III's reign before having been incarcerated on charges of high treason.

Pending Ivan IV's majority, Ivan and Andrey were de facto rulers of Russia. Their arrogant and unruly behavior provoked the anger and frustration of the young sovereign, thus sowing seeds for his future wide-scale crackdown on the Russian nobility. In one of his letters to Prince Kurbsky, Ivan painfully recalls that Prince Andrey Shuysky had put his dirty boots on his bed. The matter ended with Andrey being thrown into a cell full of hungry dogs and devoured by them (1543).

In 1540, Metropolitan Joasaphus managed to recall Ivan Belsky from exile, helping him clear the court of the Shuyskys. Two years later, Ivan Shuysky instigated a military revolt and again gained power. He had Macarius elected the new metropolitan and regent, but Macarius gradually ousted him from the Kremlin and persuaded him to resign his powers. Ivan Vasilevich Shuysky died in semi-obscurity in 1546.

=== Military service ===
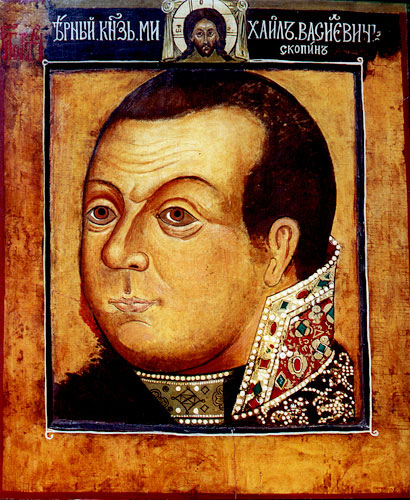
A 17th-century parsuna of Mikhail Skopin-Shuisky

Andrey Mikhailovich's elder brother, Prince Ivan Mikhailovich the Fence, was one of the leading Muscovite generals between 1531 and his death in 1559. During the regency of Elena Glinskaya he served as the governor of Moscow and of Kholmogory. In 1540, he was put in charge of the Russian army operating in Livonia. In 1542 he routed the Crimean Tatars. Two years later, he was recorded as operating against Kazan. In the late 1540s, he administered the royal palaces. In 1553, Ivan the Fence signed an armistice with the Grand Duchy of Lithuania.

During the later part of Ivan IV's reign, the Shuyskys stood aloof from the macabre politics of the Oprichnina. Probably the most skillful of Ivan's generals was Prince Alexander Borisovich Gorbaty-Shuysky, who advised the Tsar on military reform in the 1550s and presided over the Russian army during the siege and capture of Kazan in 1552. He was executed on fabricated charges in February 1565.

Prince Ivan Petrovich Shuysky, also from a cadet line of the family, commanded the defence of Pskov during its prolonged siege by Stefan Báthory. Tsar Feodor, upon making Ivan Petrovich his military advisor, devolved on him enormous revenues supplied by Pskov's merchants. Soon enough, however, the Pskovian hero was found guilty of conspiring against Boris Godunov and exiled into Belozersk, where he died on November 16, 1588.

=== The last of the Shuiskys ===
The last members of the Russian Shuisky family were four brothers: Vasily Ivanovich Shuysky, Dmitry Ivanovich Shuysky (notoriously remembered for poisoning his cousin, Mikhail Vasilyevich Skopin-Shuysky), Alexander Ivanovich Shuysky, and Ivan Ivanovich Shuysky, nicknamed "Pugovka" ("the Button"). All four held the rank of boyar and were grandsons of Andrey Mikhailovich.

During the Time of Troubles, following the death of Tsar Ivan IV and his son Feodor, a period of fierce struggle for the Russian throne began. In 1605, False Dmitry I ascended the throne. The Shuysky brothers conspired against him and, with the support of other boyars, successfully carried out a coup. In 1606, the eldest brother, Vasily, was crowned Tsar. However, his reign was short-lived: by 1610, following a series of defeats in the war against Poland, he was deposed and forced to take monastic vows. In 1611, he was taken to Poland by the Grand Crown Hetman Stanisław Żółkiewski, along with his brothers Dmitry and Ivan. They were imprisoned in the castle at Gostynin, where Vasily and Dmitry soon died. Ivan was released in 1635 as part of the Treaty of Polanów and returned to Moscow with the remains of his brothers. There, his boyar status was restored. He died in 1638. None of the brothers left any descendants.

Ivan Dmitrievich "Gubka" (the Sponge) Szujski's descendants received an Jasnahorodka estate (near Makariv), and one branch reportedly survives in Poland, who do not use their title.

== Polish branch ==
In 1534, a member of the Shuysky family, Ivan Dmitriyevich Shuysky, known as "Sponge", fled to Lithuania, probably at the same time as Symeon Belsky and Ivan Latsky. In 1536, he was granted the estate of Terebuń in the Brest district by King Sigismund the Old. The Shuysky family soon became Polonized, although they retained their allegiance to Orthodoxy for a long time, and eventually merged into the nobility of the Brest Voivodeship, holding many offices and positions.

One of the most prominent representatives of the Polish line of the Shuysky family was the distinguished historian Józef Szujski, who, however, inherited the surname Szujski from his mother. During the interwar period in Poland, Wacław Szujski served as a senator representing the BBWR party, and his grandson, Piotr Szujski (b. 1943), is the last living member of the Shuysky family.
