= Pyanchi II of Toungoo =

Pyanchi II ပျံချီငယ်

Viceroy of Toungoo
- Reign: c. January 1376 – 1379/80
- Predecessor: Ma Sein (as vassal of Pegu)
- Successor: Sokkate
- Monarch: Swa Saw Ke
- Born: c. 1360s Toungoo (Taungoo)
- Died: 1379/80; 741 ME; Toungoo
- Father: Pyanchi I
- Religion: Theravada Buddhism

Pyanchi II (Burmese: ပျံချီငယ်, pronounced [pjàɴtɕʰì ŋɛ̀]) was viceroy of Toungoo (Taungoo) from 1376 to 1379/80. He came to power three months after his father Pyanchi I was assassinated near Prome (Pyay) by the pro-Ava forces in 1375. In the ensuing power struggle at Toungoo, in which the Hanthawaddy army led by Ma Sein had seized the city of Toungoo, he and brother-in-law Sokkate managed to oust Ma Sein. The younger Pyanchi became viceroy but the young viceroy did not govern at all. He is said to have spent much of his time as a playboy. He was assassinated in 1379/80 by Sokkate, who seized the office.

== Bibliography ==
- Maha Sithu (2012) [1798]. Kyaw Win; Thein Hlaing (eds.). Yazawin Thit (in Burmese). Vol. 1–3 (2nd printing ed.). Yangon: Ya-Pyei Publishing.
- Royal Historical Commission of Burma (2003) [1832]. Hmannan Yazawin (in Burmese). Vol. 1–3. Yangon: Ministry of Information, Myanmar.
- Sein Lwin Lay, Kahtika U (2006) [1968]. Mintaya Shwe Hti and Bayinnaung: Ketumadi Taungoo Yazawin (in Burmese) (2nd printing ed.). Yangon: Yan Aung Sarpay.

Pyanchi II of Toungoo Ava Kingdom Died: 1379/80
Royal titles
Preceded by Ma Sein as Governor-General	Viceroy of Toungoo; 1376 – 1379/80	Succeeded by Sokkate
