= Daniel, Metropolitan of Moscow =

Metropolitan of Moscow from 1522 to 1539

Daniel
- Metropolitan of Moscow and all Russia
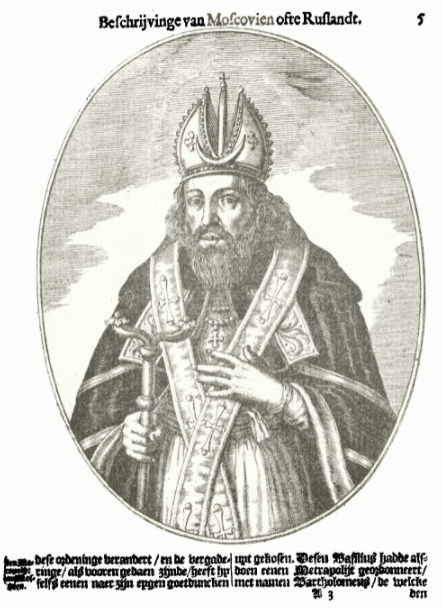
- Engraving, 1615
- Church: Russian Orthodox Church
- See: Moscow
- Installed: 1522
- Term ended: 1539
- Predecessor: Varlaam
- Successor: Joasaphus

Personal details
- Born: before 1492
- Died: 22 May 1547

Daniel (Russian: Даниил; before 1492 – May 22, 1547) was Metropolitan of Moscow and all Rus', the primate of the Russian Orthodox Church, from 1522 to 1539. He was the eighth metropolitan in Moscow to be appointed without the approval of the Ecumenical Patriarch of Constantinople as had been the norm.

He represented the belligerent ecclesiastic circle that was interested in alliance with the princely authority.

== Biography ==
Daniel was a monk at Joseph-Volokolamsk Monastery and a student of Joseph Volotsky. In 1515, he was elected hegumen of the monastery, which had been under the patronage of Vasili III. When Daniel became metropolitan, he assisted Vasili III in summoning the Vasili Shemyachich, the prince of Seversk, to Moscow and imprisoning him. In 1525, bypassing the ecclesiastic canons, Daniel sanctioned the divorce between Vasili III and his childless wife Solomonia Saburova, which caused general discontent in Muscovy.

Daniel was the initiator of a number of church councils (sobory) between 1525 and 1531, which condemned the opponents of the Josephinians - Maximus the Greek and Vassian Patrikeyev. While on his deathbed, Vasili III asked Daniel to take care of his wife and son. The metropolitan solemnly blessed Ivan IV in the Cathedral of the Dormition.

During the struggle between the Shuisky family and prince Ivan Belsky in 1538, Daniel supported the latter, for which he would be defrocked a year later by the Shuiskys. He died on May 22, 1547, in the Joseph-Volokolamsk Monastery, where he was incarcerated.

Daniel was the author of a number of works, condemning heretics. It is generally assumed that he was the main force behind the creation of the Nikon Chronicle.

== Sources ==
- "Даниил, митрополит московский" . Brockhaus and Efron Encyclopedic Dictionary (in Russian). 1906.

Preceded by Varlaam	Metropolitan of Moscow and all Rus'; 1522–1539	Succeeded by Joasaphus
