= Hlynsk, Romny Raion =

Coordinates: 50°36′55″N 33°19′29″E

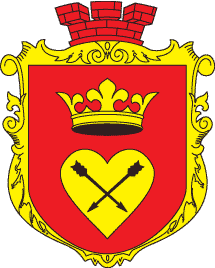
Hlynsk coat of arms

Hlynsk (Ukrainian: Глинськ) is a village of Romny Raion, Sumy Oblast. The village is administered by its own rural council. The population is about 1.2 thousand. The settlement is known for its ties with Mamai's descendants and representatives of the Glinski family. Until the 19th century it was a city with its own rathaus.

== Geography ==
The village is located on the banks of the Sula River which is a tributary of the Dnieper River. The village is located between two hydrological zakazniks (preserves), Andryashivka-Hudyma (established in 1977) and Bilovoda (established in 1980).

== History ==
The first historical mention of Hlynsk comes from 1320. During the 15th century it belonged to the princely Glinski (Hlynsky) family. In 1680 the town became part of Lubny Regiment. Remains of historical fortifications from those times can be found in the area. During the Soviet period Hlynsk served as a raion centre.

== Historical landmarks ==
- St Nicholas church (built in 1790s by Sotnik Kryzhanovsky) revived in 1989
- Ruins of a fortress

== Gallery ==
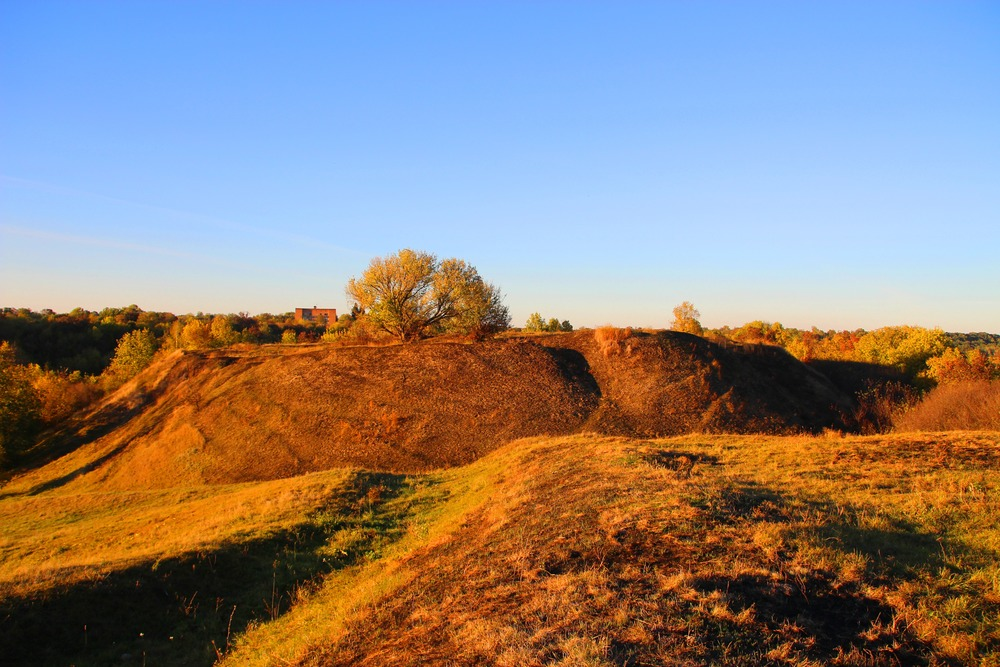
Remains of the historical fort in Hlynsk

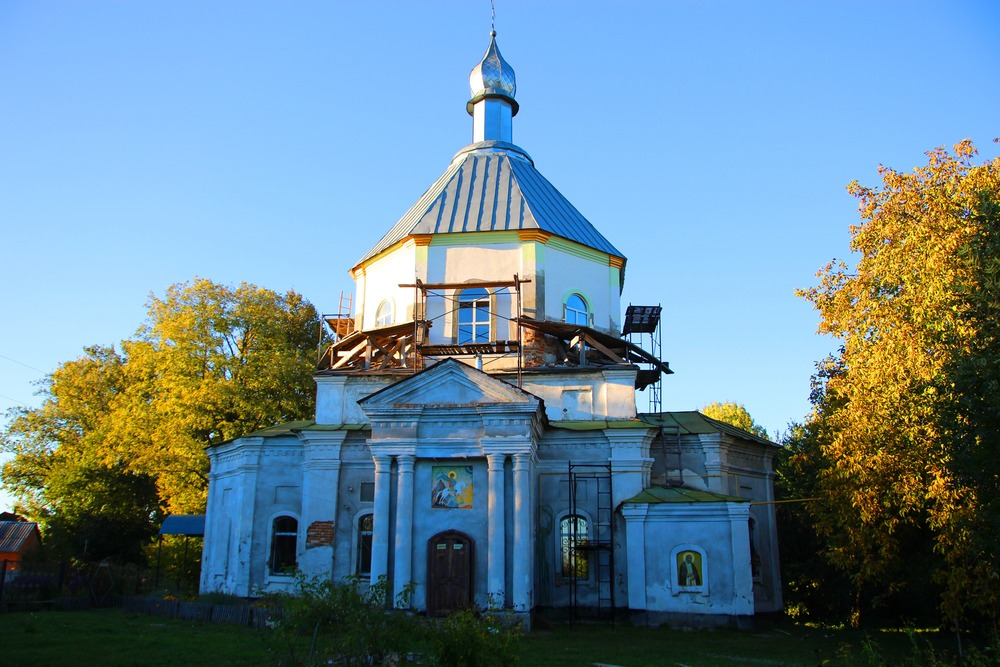
Saint Nicholas Church

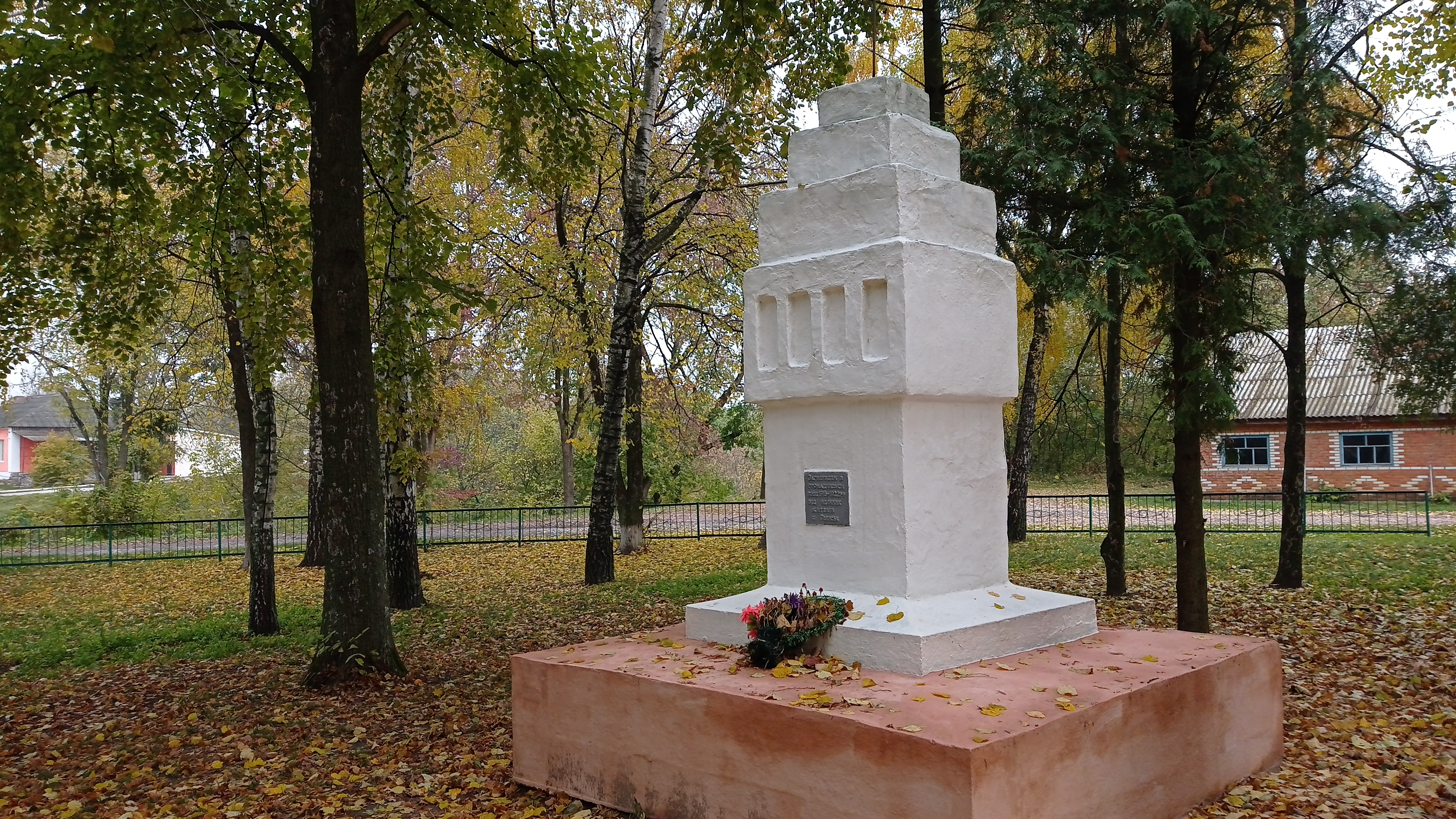
Common grave of Civil War victims
