= Julianna Glinski =

American military officer and Monuments Woman

- Born: Julianna Bumbar; 24 July 1920; Buffalo, New York, U.S.
- Died: 11 May 1995
- Branch: United States Army; United States Air Force
- Rank: Major, United States Air Force Reserves

Julianna Glinski (née Bumbar; July 24, 1920 – May 11, 1995), was a First Lieutenant in the Women's Army Auxiliary Corps (WAAC) in the Monuments, Fine Arts and Archives Section Unit of the US Group Control Council (USGCC) in Germany during World War II. She assisted in the return of the Veit Stoss Altarpiece to Kraków, Poland in 1946.

== Early life ==
Julianna Bumbar was born in Buffalo, New York to Ukrainian immigrants from Galicia. She completed high school and enlisted as an aviation cadet in the Women's Army Auxiliary Corps (WAAC) on September 18, 1942.

== Career ==
First Lieutenant Bumbar reported for duty in August 1945 with the Monuments, Fine Arts and Archives Section Unit of the US Group Control Council (USGCC) in Höchst, Germany, where she worked as an administrative officer under Lieutenant Colonel Mason Hammond. Under the MFAA Section of the Office of Military Government, United States (OMGUS), Bumbar authored communiques and reports for military officials.

Acting as translator and interpreter, Lt. Bumbar accompanied a group from the MFAA that was tasked with returning Nazi-looted objects to Poland. Under Major Karol Estreicher, the MFAA returned the Veit Stoss Altarpiece and Leonardo da Vinci's Lady with an Ermine among other important materials to Kraków. In her report on the trip, Bumbar noted the positive reception received by the Americans from the city and its people. The delegation attended several events in honor of the return of the city's cultural heritage, where Bumbar executed her duties as translator and interpreter. She received the Silver Cross of Merit, a Polish civil state award, for her work with the Veit Stoss Altarpiece.

Bumbar was honorably discharged in 1946 and returned to the US.

After her discharge from the Women's Army Air Reserves, Bumbar commissioned in the US Air Force Reserves. She served in the Korean War from 1950 to 1952. She retired from the Reserves with the rank of Major in 1962. Over her military career, she received the American Campaign Medal, Army of Occupation Medal, European African Middle Eastern Campaign Medal, and the World War II Victory Medal.

Bumbar married fellow World War II veteran Edmund Glinski. She died on May 11, 1995 following a brief illness.
