= Sary-Aka's embassy =

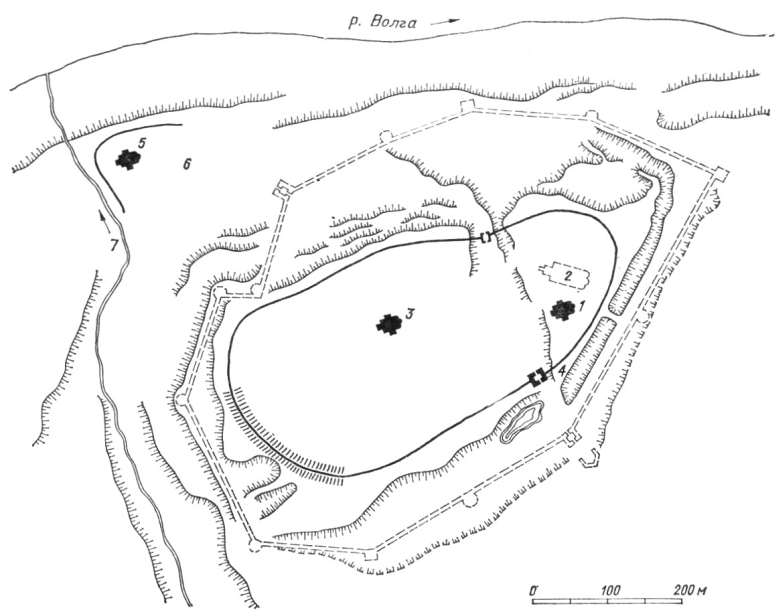
A medieval plan of the wooden fort of Nizhny Novgorod from the 13th or 14th century before it was replaced with a stone kremlin that started in 1374

Sary-Aka's embassy (Russian: Посольство Сарайки) was a mission sent by the Blue Horde commander Mamai to the eastern Russian principality of Nizhny Novgorod in 1374 to undermine the influence of the prince of Moscow in the latter's struggle for supremacy among the Russian principalities, owing to his open opposition to Mongol authority in Russia. The embassy was ambushed, and the survivors were imprisoned in the wooden fort of Nizhny Novgorod until 31 March 1375, when Sary-Aka along with the rest of the Tatars were massacred by the Russians.

== Background ==
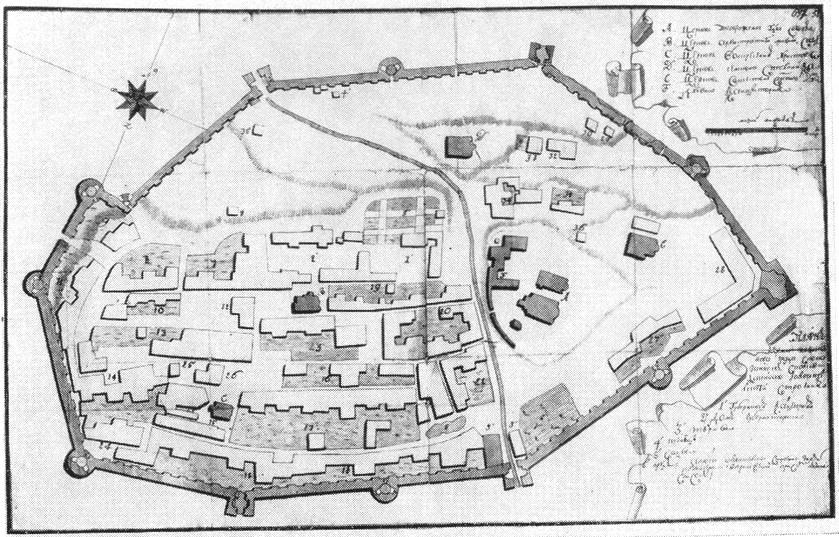
A plan of the Nizhny Novgorod Kremlin from the 17th century before general renovation

Sary-Aka's embassy was dispatched by Mamai, a military commander of the Blue Horde, which ruled over lands in what is now the southern Ukrainian steppes and the Crimean Peninsula, to Nizhny Novgorod in 1374. The ambassador was accompanied by a force of one thousand men-at-arms. The same year, the detachment was assaulted by Russian forces to the south of Nizhny Novgorod, and most of its members were killed.

The survivors were captured and imprisoned in the Nizhny Novgorod Kremlin, along with the ambassador himself, although they were allowed to stay together and keep their weapons with them.

In March 1375, a congress of Russian princes took place in Pereslavl-Zalessky. It was chaired by Dmitry Ivanovich Donskoy, who was the prince of Moscow and grand prince of Vladimir. Among those in attendance were Oleg Ivanovich of Ryazan and Dmitry Konstantinovich of Nizhny Novgorod-Suzdal. Mikhail II of Tver did not attend.

During the congress, it was decided to launch a coordinated campaign against Mamai. To ensure the security of the congress, the eldest son of Dmitry Konstantinovich, Vasiliy Kirdyapa, was ordered to dispatch an armed force to Nizhny Novgorod to arrest the surviving members of Sary-Aka's embassy and disarm them on 31 March 1375.

== The massacre of the embassy ==
Sary-Aka either anticipated the threat or was warned in advance so he ordered the captured Tatar battlers to break out of the prison located next to the Dmitrovskaya Tower and occupy the courtyard of the local bishop nearby. After the Tatars assumed a defensive position they injured and killed many local denizens with their bows and also took Dionysius, the bishop of Suzdal as a hostage. Some contemporary sources claim Sary-Aka shot an arrow into the bishop that failed to hit him but barely scratched the gown. Being enraged with the assault on the bishop, local citizens along with the garrison sieged the courtyard and eventually massacred all the Tatars.

== The outcome ==
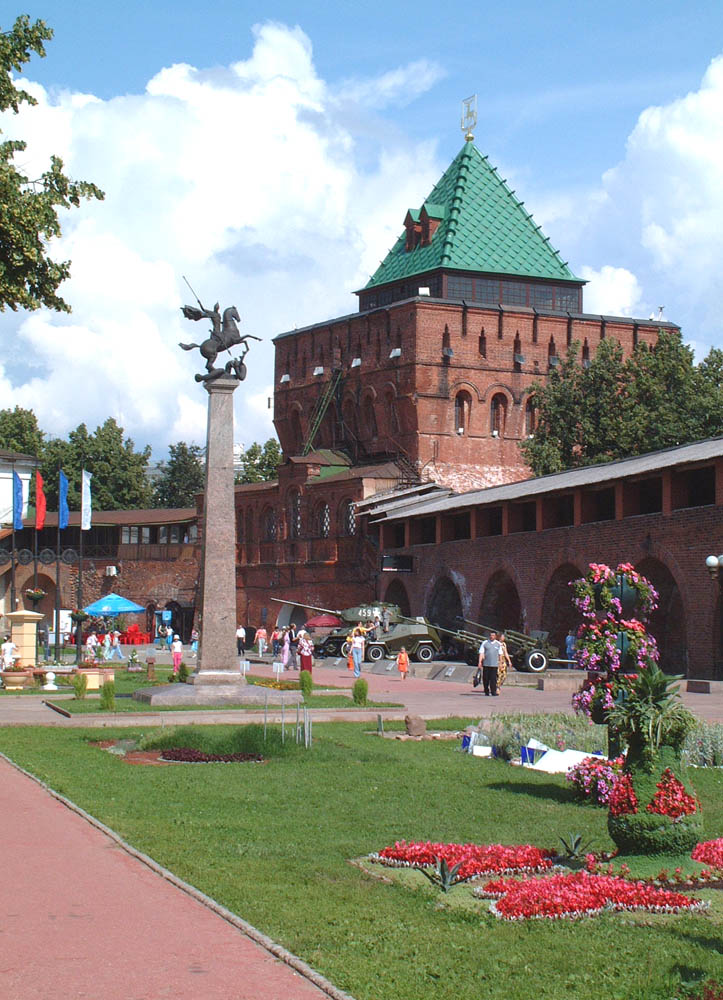
Dmitrovskaya Tower of Nizhny Novgorod Kremlin

The purpose of the embassy is quite vague as no details for the preceding events could be found. It could either be a permanent mission from the Golden Horde in Nizhny Novgorod, akin to the one located in Moscow, or indeed Sary-Aka was dispatched to Dmitri Konstantinovich of Suzdal to heighten his strife against the prince of Moscow, who recently forced him to cease any claims for the crown of the city of Vladimir.

It is also unclear who issued an order for the massacre since neither Dmitry Ivanovich Donskoy, nor Dmitri Konstantinovich of Suzdal did it. Apart from the latter's son some later sources mention Alexius, Metropolitan of Moscow, who forced his subordinate Dionysius to initiate the killing in an attempt to spark Mamai's revenge and therefore consolidate the Russian warlords.

Whatever the actual reason was, all the Russian principalities submitted to the prince of Moscow, including Ryazan and Nizhny Novgorod, although Tver continued its struggle for the supremacy.

== Aftermath ==
Mamai's response was delayed due to an internal power struggle within the Golden Horde, and so in 1377, he dispatched Arab-Shah Muzaffar, khan of the Blue Horde, to pillage the eastern Russian principalities of Nizhny Novgorod and Ryazan.

On 2 August 1377, the Russian forces were taken by surprise and defeated at the Battle on the Pyana River. The Tatars were then able to reach Nizhny Novgorod, prompting the evacuation of the residents by boat, while Dmitry of Suzdal evacuated to Suzdal. The town itself was sacked. The same fate befell Ryazan, and this marked a turning point in the open confrontation between Moscow and the Blue Horde.

Mamai was decisively defeated in two consecutive battles: the Battle of the Vozha River in 1378 and the Battle of Kulikovo in 1380. Dmitry Ivanovich Donskoy strengthened his position as the grand prince of Vladimir.
