= Elena Glinskaya =

Grand princess of Moscow from 1526 to 1533

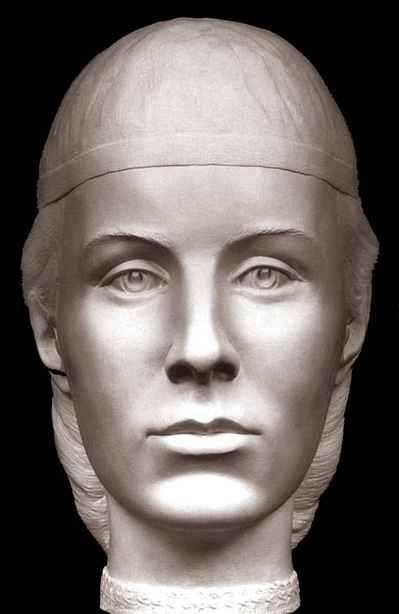
- Forensic facial reconstruction by Sergey Nikitin, 1999

Regent of Russia
- Regency: 4 December 1533 – 4 April 1538
- Monarch: Ivan IV

Grand Princess consort of Moscow
- Tenure: 21 January 1526 – 4 December 1533
- Born: c. 1510
- Died: 4 April 1538 (age 27–28)
- Burial: Ascension Convent, Kolomenskoye; Archangel Cathedral, Kremlin
- Spouse: Vasili III of Russia (m. 1526; died 1533)
- Issue: Ivan Vasilyevich; Yuri Vasilevich
- House: Glinski; Rurik (by marriage)
- Father: Vasili Lvovich Glinsky
- Mother: Ana Jakšić

Elena Vasilyevna Glinskaya (Note: Russian: Елена Васильевна Глинская; also written as Glinskaia in English) (c. 1510 – 4 April 1538) was the grand princess consort of Moscow as the second wife of Vasili III of Russia, and de facto regent of Russia from 1533 until her death in 1538. She was the mother of the first crowned tsar Ivan IV.

== Biography ==
=== Early life and marriage ===
Elena was born in 1510 as the daughter of Prince Vasili Lvovich Glinsky, a member of the Glinsky family, and Serbian Princess Ana Jakšić from the Jakšić noble family. She had a younger sister, Anastasia, and two brothers, Yuri(d. 1547) and Mikhail (d. 1559).

The Glinsky family originally claimed descent from Mamai; by the 1520s, they claimed that they were blood relations of Genghis Khan himself. Originally, the family lived on the territory of the Polish-Lithuanian Commonwealth. However, Glinskaya's uncle, Prince Mikhail Lvovich Glinsky, betrayed the commonwealth and joined the side of the Principality of Moscow in the Third Lithuanian-Muscovite War in 1508, in what would come to be known as the Glinski rebellion. As a result, the Glinsky family was exiled and their lands confiscated. The ruler of Moscow, Grand Duke Vasili III, bestowed on them the cities of Maloyaroslavets and Borovsk. Mikhail participated in the Siege of Smolensk in 1514, hoping to receive Smolensk as a gift from Vasili; offended when Vasili did not grant him Smolensk, he attempted to join the side of the Lithuanians. For this betrayal he was imprisoned, and would only be released in 1527 on the request of his niece Elena.

In 1525, Grand Duke Vasili resolved to divorce his wife, Solomoniya Saburova, as they had been unable to conceive children, and marry Elena. The decision was opposed by the boyars, firstly because Elena did not come from an old boyar family, and secondly because her uncle Mikhail was imprisoned for treason. According to the chronicles, he chose Elena "because of the beauty of her face and her young age." For Elena, he shaved his beard and changed his royal clothing for a Polish kontusz, an action considered highly unusual for a tsar.

Despite strong opposition from the Russian Orthodox Church, the divorce was effected. They were married on 21 January 1526.

On 25 August 1530, Glinskaya gave birth to their first son, Ioann (the future Ivan the Terrible) named after John the Baptist. On 28 October 1532, their second son, Yuri (future Prince Yuri of Uglich), was born.

=== Regency ===
On his deathbed, Vasili III transferred his powers to her until their elder son Ivan, who was only 3 at the time, was mature enough to rule the country. According to the chronicles later composed at the court of Ivan, Vasili presented Glinskaya with the sceptre, allowing her to rule as regent. However, according to the Pskov Chronicle, Vasili entrusted a small boyar council with taking care of Ivan until he was 15. Generally, widows of Moscow sovereigns were given an appanage, but they were never allowed to become regents. Before he died, Vasili added Glinskaya's uncle Mikhail as an executor of his will, since Mikhail was Glinskaya's kin, and entrusted him with the safety of the royal family.

Glinskaya took as her lover a favourite, the boyar Ivan Ovchina-Obolensky. Soon after, Ovchina-Obolensky began to seek the expulsion of Mikhail Glinsky from the court. By August 1534, Mikhail Glinsky was accused of poisoning Vasili III and imprisoned, and eventually executed.

In February of the same year, Grand Duke of Lithuania and King of Poland Sigismund I the Old waged war against Moscow; in July, he besieged the city of Starodub. At the same time, Crimean Tatar forces attacked Ryazan Oblast, forcing Glinskaya to wage a war on two fronts; Starodub was destroyed. In February 1536, the war turned in the favor of the Russians, and Sigismund decided to make peace. An armistice was signed in February 1537.

In 1535, Glinskaya carried out a currency reform that introduced a unified monetary system in the state. The kopek was first introduced in this system, named as such because it depicted Saint George with a spear (Russian: копьё, romanized: kopyo). She also introduced a measure in which counterfeiters had molten tin poured down their throats or their hands chopped off. She had a new defensive wall constructed around Moscow, invited settlers from Lithuania, bought Russian prisoners free and instigated measures to protect travellers against street bandits.

In 1537, Glinskaya's health apparently worsened, and she began to visit multiple monasteries. Ovchina-Obolensky convinced her to have Andrei of Staritsa, Vasili III's brother, arrested. Andrei died within half a year.

Glinskaya died on 4 April 1538. Her son's governess, Agrippina Fedorovna Chelyadnina, was arrested in connection with Elena's death. Some historians believe that Elena was poisoned by the Shuiskys, who usurped power after her death. Recent studies of her remains tend to support the thesis that she was poisoned.

== Sources ==
- "Елена Глинская" . Brockhaus and Efron Encyclopedic Dictionary (in Russian). 1906.
- Martin, Janet (1995). Medieval Russia 980-1584. Cambridge: Cambridge University Press. ISBN 9780521368322.
- Skrynnikov, Ruslan Grigor'evitch (2015). Reign of Terror: Ivan IV. Translated by Paul Williams. doi:10.1163/9789004304017_003. ISBN 9789004304017.

Elena Glinskaya House of Glinski Born: ca. 1510 Died: 4 April [O.S. 13 April] 1538
Russian royalty
| Vacant Title last held by Solomoniya Saburova | Grand Princess of Moscow; 1526–1533 | Vacant Title next held by Anastasia Romanovna as Tsaritsa of all Russia |
