= Ma Sein of Toungoo =

Ma Sein

Governor−General of Toungoo
- In office c. October 1375 – c. January 1376
- Monarch: Binnya U (1375−76)
- Preceded by: Pyanchi I
- Succeeded by: Pyanchi II

Personal details
- Died: c. January 1376 c. Pyatho 737 ME Toungoo (Taungoo)

Military service
- Allegiance: Hanthawaddy kingdom
- Branch/service: Royal Hanthawaddy Army
- Years of service: ? − 1376
- Rank: Commander

Ma (Note: Per (Pan Hla 2005: 6, footnote 1 and 8, footnote 1), "Ma" is an honorific for males that means "male or lineage", and roughly equivalent to Burmese "Nga" or "Maung".) Sein (Burmese: မစိန်, Burmese pronunciation: [maʔ sèiɴ]) was a Hanthawaddy commander who occupied Toungoo (Taungoo) for three months in 1375−76. The ethnic Mon commander was posted in Toungoo by King Binnya U of Hanthawaddy upon request of Viceroy Pyanchi I of Toungoo in order to raise a rebellion against Ava. His army was in charge of Toungoo in 1375 when Pyanchi I was assassinated near Prome (Pyay) by pro-Ava forces. The commander claimed the state of Toungoo on behalf of Hanthawaddy, and resisted the subsequent siege by Pyanchi I's son Pyanchi II and son-in-law Sokkate for three months. He was put to death when the siege was broken three months later.

== Bibliography ==
- Maha Sithu (2012) [1798]. Kyaw Win; Thein Hlaing (eds.). Yazawin Thit (in Burmese). Vol. 1–3 (2nd printing ed.). Yangon: Ya-Pyei Publishing.
- Pan Hla, Nai (2005) [1968]. Razadarit Ayedawbon (in Burmese) (8th printing ed.). Yangon: Armanthit Sarpay.
- Royal Historical Commission of Burma (2003) [1832]. Hmannan Yazawin (in Burmese). Vol. 1–3. Yangon: Ministry of Information, Myanmar.
- Sein Lwin Lay, Kahtika U (2006) [1968]. Mintaya Shwe Hti and Bayinnaung: Ketumadi Taungoo Yazawin (in Burmese) (2nd printing ed.). Yangon: Yan Aung Sarpay.

Ma Sein of Toungoo Hanthawaddy kingdom Died: c. January 1376
Royal titles
Preceded by Pyanchi I as viceroy	Governor−General of Toungoo; 1375 – 1376	Succeeded by Pyanchi II as governor
