= Pyanchi I of Toungoo =

Pyanchi I ပျံချီ

Viceroy of Toungoo
- Reign: 29 March 1367 – c. October 1375
- Predecessor: Theingaba (as king)
- Successor: Ma Sein (as vassal of Pegu)
- Monarch: Swa Saw Ke
- Born: Unknown; Toungoo (Taungoo)
- Died: c. October 1375 c. late Thadingyut / early Tazaungmon 737 ME near Prome (Pyay)
- Spouse: Soe Min
- Issue: Pyanchi II (son) unnamed daughter
- Father: Theingaba
- Religion: Theravada Buddhism

Pyanchi I (Burmese: ပျံချီ, pronounced [pjàɴtɕʰì]; formally Anawrahta) was viceroy of Toungoo (Taungoo) from 1367 to 1375. He ruled the region like a sovereign king. But when he tried to revolt with Hanthawaddy's help in 1375, his nominal overlord King Swa Saw Ke of Ava had him assassinated near Prome (Pyay).

== Brief ==
When his father King Theingaba of Toungoo died on 29 March 1367, Pyanchi was in exile at Pegu (Bago) in the Mon-speaking Kingdom of Hanthawaddy. Though he had been estranged from his father, Pyanchi returned to his native Toungoo (Taungoo), and took over the throne with the royal style of A-Saw Myat-Swa Nawrahta.

By then, Toungoo was back to the petty state that it once was before Theingaba set out to expand the former vassal state of Pinya in 1358. Theingaba, the first ruler of Toungoo to have successfully stayed independent, had been at war with Ava since 1365, and had been on the defensive. Ava had retaken the Pyinmana region from Toungoo since 1365−66, and defeated Toungoo's neighboring state Taungdwingyi as Pyanchi took over Toungoo. With Ava forces closing in, Pyanchi submitted to Ava.

As with those by previous Toungoo rulers, Pyanchi's submission was nominal. With Ava still firming up its borders with its neighboring states in the first half of the 1370s, (Note: Ava established the southern border with Hanthawaddy in 1370/71 per (Hmannan Vol. 1 2003: 407−408); the western border with Arakan in 1373/74 per (Hmannan Vol. 1 2003: 410−411); the northern border by going to war with the northern Shan state of Mong Mao in 1371−73 (Hmannan Vol. 1 2003: 409−410); and the eastern border with Lan Na in 1374/75 (Hmannan Vol. 1 2003: 413).) Pyanchi essentially ruled his fiefdom like a sovereign king. When he saw that Ava had its hands full with the northern Shan states (1371−73), he began contemplating a rebellion. He had kept up his close ties with Pegu, and sought military assistance from Pegu when Ava and Lan Na, the kingdom east of Toungoo, moved closer to war in 1374. Though King Binnya U of Pegu had agreed to a non-aggression pact with King Swa Saw Ke of Ava in 1370, the Hanthawaddy ruler sent a sizable force consisting of infantry, cavalry and war elephants to Toungoo.

At Ava (Inwa), Swa was not yet willing to go to war with Pegu over Toungoo. Instead, the king sought another way, and enlisted his brother Gov. Saw Yan Naung of Prome's help. In 1375, Yan Naung proposed a marriage of state between his daughter and Pyanchi's son, Pyanchi II, with the marriage ceremony to be held in Prome (Pyay). Pyanchi understood the proposal of marriage to be the first step toward joint rebellion against Ava. A Toungoo−Prome axis backed by Pegu would form a formidable Lower Burma bulwark against Central Burma-based Ava. Pyanchi agreed to the proposal, and went to Prome with a small battalion. It was a trap. The Toungoo contingent was ambushed near Prome, and Pyanchi was killed although his son and son-in-law both escaped. It was c. October 1375. (Note: Based on chronicle reporting, the ambush took place either between 30 March 1375 and December 1375, or between 30 March 1375 and August 1375. Main chronicles (Yazawin Thit Vol. 1 2012: 335) and (Hmannan Vol. 2 2003: 164−165) as well as the regional Toungoo Yazawin chronicle (Sein Lwin Lay 2006: 23−24) say that Pyanchi and his successor Ma Sein both died in 747 ME (30 March 1375 to 28 March 1376) within a period of either 3 or 7 months. Hmannan and Yazawin Thit say 3 months while Toungoo Yazawin says 7 months. This appears to be another case of mis-copying 3 for 7 (or less probably, vice versa); the Burmese numerals "၃" (3) and "၇" (7) in longhand are quite similar, and can easily be mis-copied. Furthermore, all chronicles say that Pyanchi was lured to Prome on the promise on a marriage between Pyanchi's son and Yan Naung's daughter. This wedding would most likely have been scheduled after the Buddhist Lent, which ended on 10 October 1375 that year, and probably after the rainy season—i.e. late October 1375, or early November 1375.)

At Toungoo, Ma Sein, the commander of the Peguan army stationed there seized the throne, and held out for three months.

== Bibliography ==
- Htin Aung, Maung (1967). A History of Burma. New York and London: Cambridge University Press.
- Maha Sithu (2012) [1798]. Myint Swe; Kyaw Win; Thein Hlaing (eds.). Yazawin Thit (in Burmese). Vol. 1–3 (2nd printing ed.). Yangon: Ya-Pyei Publishing.
- Royal Historical Commission of Burma (2003) [1832]. Hmannan Yazawin (in Burmese). Vol. 1–3. Yangon: Ministry of Information, Myanmar.
- Sein Lwin Lay, Kahtika U (2006) [1968]. Mintaya Shwe Hti and Bayinnaung: Ketumadi Taungoo Yazawin (in Burmese) (2nd printing ed.). Yangon: Yan Aung Sarpay.

Pyanchi I of Toungoo Ava Kingdom Died: c. October 1375
Royal titles
Preceded by Theingaba as king	Viceroy of Toungoo; 1367 – 1375	Succeeded by Ma Sein as vassal of Pegu
