= Juozas Glinskis =

Lithuanian playwright (born 1933)

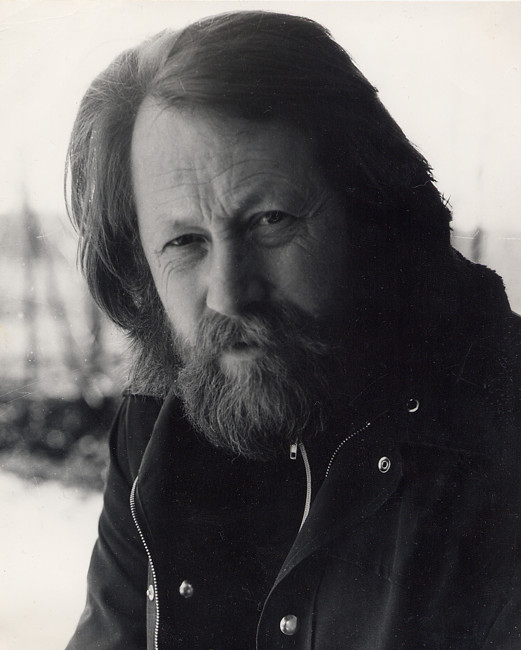
Juozas Glinskis (1986)

Juozas Glinskis (born October 15, 1933, Sindriūnai, Pasvalys district) is a Lithuanian playwright.

== Works ==
Juozas Glinskis marked a new stage in the development of Lithuanian theatre in the second half of the 20th century. He broke the traditional Lithuanian (usually a poetic drama) model, and is known as the pioneer of Lithuanian “theatre of cruelty”.

The writer himself, however, calls his works “cognitive dramas”. They cross the protective boundaries of “common sense”; the play's dramaturgic dynamics are based on shadings and manifestations of evil. In terms of style, that is a sarcastic grotesque, an anti-psychological caricature, a subconscious hysteria, and a combination of folkloric “native” motives and overshot of lyricism and romantic emotion.

“Grasos namai” and “Kingas” (directed by Jonas Jurašas in 1970 and Jonas Vaitkus in 1980) marked a turning point in the hierarchy of aesthetic values in Lithuanian theatre. These and other J. Glinskis’ plays demanded new means of expression from the Lithuanian theatre: naked passions, harsh validation of matter, superiority of metaphors, and avant-garde challenges.

J.Glinskis newest drama „Vieno Tėvo Vaikai“ (Children of One Father) received the highest Lithuanian award from the directors of the expert commission - 1000 years Lithuania

== Political activism ==
Glinskis and his family were engaged the Lithuanian pro-independence political movement Sąjūdis, acting against the suppression of the Soviet dictatorship and has been a delegate of Sąjūdis. His 1968 soviet critical play "Pasivaikščiojimas mėnesienoje“ (A walk in the moonlight), that presented the members and leaders of the communist party as mental house inmates, was under conspiracy circumstances brought to the US, with help by Andrei Sakharov. It premiered at a theater in New York City. As a political companion and friend of Vytautas Landsbergis, the first head of state of Lithuania after its declaration of independence from the Soviet Union, he wrote the biography of Landsbergis in 1990–1991, including the history of independence of Lithuania in the book „Laisvės Byla“ (File of Freedom).
