= Vladislav Glinsky =

Belarusian footballer (born 2000)

Personal information
- Full name: Vladislav Vitalyevich Glinsky
- Date of birth: 29 May 2000 (age 26)
- Place of birth: Polotsk, Vitebsk Oblast, Belarus
- Height: 1.77 m (5 ft 10 in)
- Position: Defender

Youth career
- 2015–2017: RUOR Minsk

Senior career*
Years	Team	Apps	(Gls)
2017–2019	Torpedo Minsk	40	(0)
2019	BATE Borisov	0	(0)
2020–2021	Isloch Minsk Raion	3	(0)
2021	→ Vitebsk (loan)	8	(0)
2022–2023	Vitebsk	34	(1)

International career^{‡}
2016–2017	Belarus U17	5	(0)
2017–2018	Belarus U19	6	(0)
2018–2019	Belarus U21	4	(0)
- * Club domestic league appearances and goals as of 31 December 2023 ‡ National team caps and goals as of 8 June 2019

Vladislav Vitalyevich Glinsky (Belarusian: Уладзіслаў Вітальевіч Глінскі; Russian: Владислав Витальевич Глинский; born 29 May 2000) is a Belarusian professional footballer.
