= Gliński coat of arms =

Polish coat of arms

Gliński
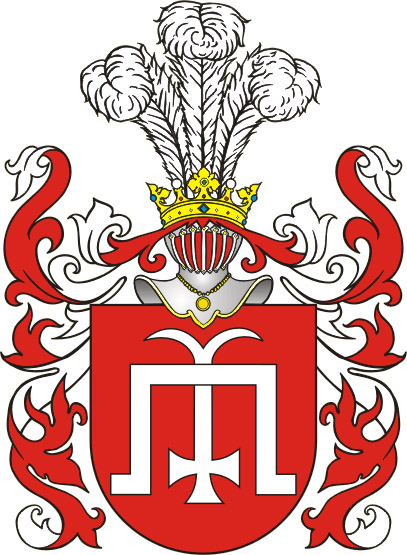
- Earliest mention: unknown
- Towns: none
- Families: Daszkowicz, Gliński, Hliński, Lichodziejewski, Lichodziejski, Mamaj

Gliński is a Polish coat of arms. It was used by several szlachta families in the time of the Polish–Lithuanian Commonwealth.

== Notable bearers ==
Notable bearers of this coat of arms include:

- Michał Gliński

== See also ==
- Polish heraldry
- Mamay
- List of Polish nobility coats of arms
