= Mikhail Iosifovich Glinsky =

Soviet general (1901–1991)

- Born: 21 November 1901; Malaya Kamenka, Minsk Governorate, Russian Empire (now in Mogilev Oblast, Belarus)
- Died: 30 December 1991 (aged 90); Moscow, Russian Federation
- Military career
- Allegiance: Soviet Russia (1919–1922); Soviet Union (1922–1960)
- Branch: Red Army / Soviet Army
- Service years: 1919–1960
- Rank: Lieutenant-general
- Commands: 76th Cavalry Regiment (1939–1941); 41st Cavalry Division (1941–1942); 7th Guards Cavalry Division (1942–1943); 15th Cavalry Corps (1943–1945); 19th Rifle Corps (1946–1947); 1st Rifle Corps (1948–1950); 24th Guards Rifle Corps (1950–1954)
- Conflicts: Russian Civil War; World War II

Mikhail Iosifovich Glinsky (Russian: Михаи́л Ио́сифович Гли́нский; 21 November 1901 – 30 December 1991) was a Soviet military leader.

== Biography ==
Mikhail Iosifovich Glinsky was born to ethnic Russian peasant parents in the village of Malaya Kamenka in the Minsk Governorate of the Russian Empire (now in Mogilev Oblast, Belarus) in 1901. He joined the Red Army and Bolshevik Party during the Russian Civil War in 1919.

Assigned to the 22nd Brigade of the Red Army's 8th Rifle Division from October 1920 to November 1921, he later joined the cavalry and went on to hold staff officer positions in the cavalry until the 1930s. He went on to attend the Frunze Military Academy in 1932–1933 and served as the military attaché with the Soviet ambassador in Latvia from December 1934 to May 1938.

In World War II, Glinsky successively served as commander of the 41st Cavalry Division from December 1941 to January 1942 and 7th Guards Cavalry Division from January 1942 to March 1943. He was the chief of staff of the 4th Shock Army in May–June 1943 and commander of the 15th Cavalry Corps from February 1944 to May 1945, ascending in rank to lieutenant-general on 20 April 1945.

Continuing to hold corps-level commands in the post-war Soviet Army, Glinsky was appointed commander of the 19th Rifle Corps in 1946–1947, the 1st Rifle Corps in 1948–1950, and the 24th Guards Rifle Corps in 1950–1954. Lieutenant-General Mikhail Glinsky was deputy commander of the Odessa Military District in 1954–1960.

Mikhail Glinsky retired from active duty in the armed forces in 1960.

He died in Moscow on 30 December 1991, when the Russian Federation was a few days old.
