= Metropolis of Moscow and all Rus' =

The Metropolis of Moscow and all Rus' (Russian: Митрополия Московская и всея Руси, romanized: Mitropoliya Moskovskaya i vseya Rusi) was a metropolis that was unilaterally erected by hierarchs of the Eastern Orthodox Church in the territory of the Principality of Moscow (Note: The Principality (or Grand Duchy) of Moscow was a predecessor state of current state called the Russian Federation.) in 1448. The first metropolitan was Jonah of Moscow; he was appointed without the approval of the Ecumenical Patriarch of Constantinople. The metropolis split from the Metropolis of Kiev and all Rus' because the previous metropolitan — Isidore of Kiev — had accepted the Union of Florence. Seventeen prelates succeeded Jonah until Moscow's canonical status was regularised in 1589 with the recognition of Job by the Ecumenical Patriarch. Job was also raised to the status of patriarch and was the first Patriarch of Moscow. The Moscow Patriarchate was a Caesaropapist entity that was under the control of the Russian state. The episcopal seat was the Dormition Cathedral in Moscow.

== Background ==
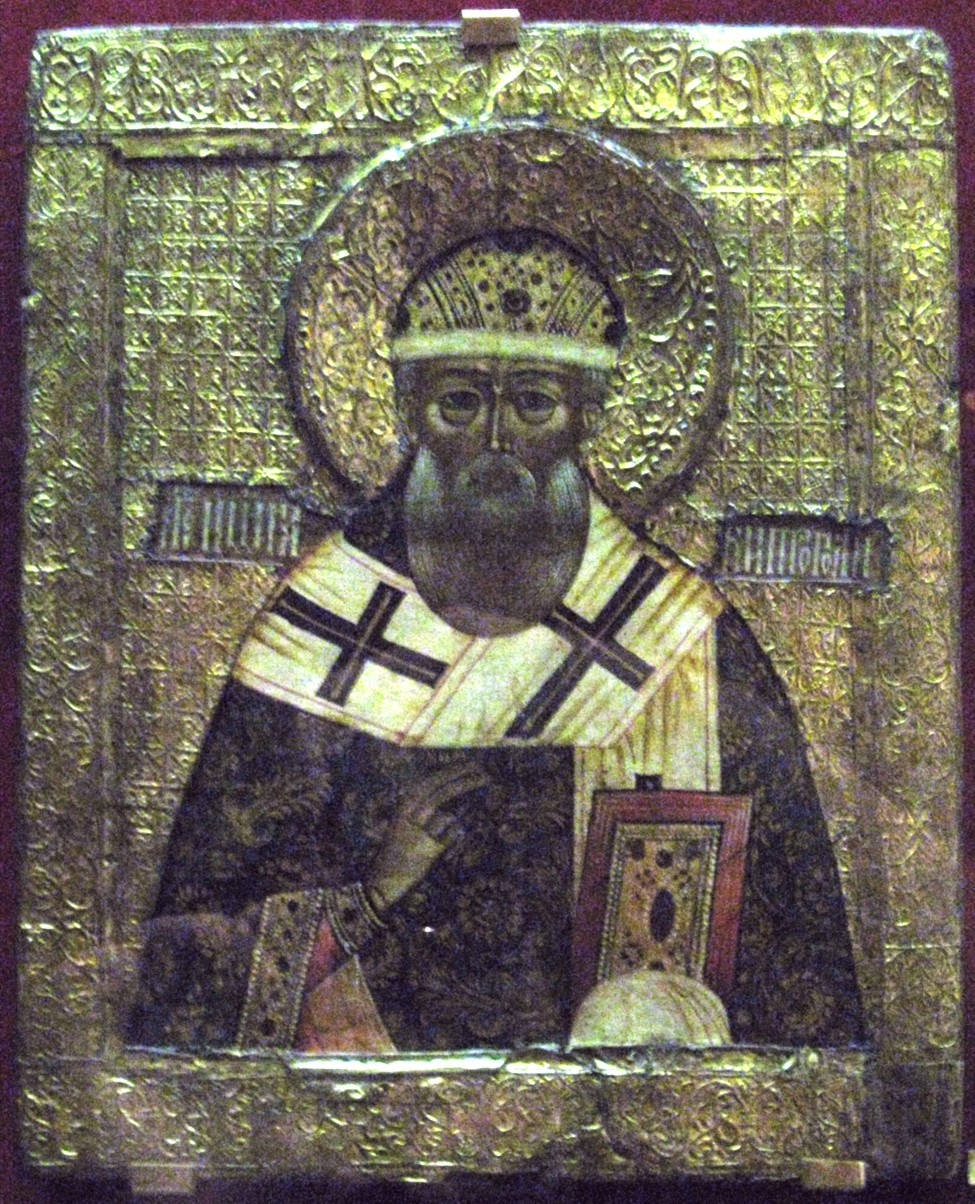
Jonah of Moscow, the first metropolitan of Moscow and all Rus' since 1448

An Ecumenical council of the Church — the Council of Florence — took place from 1431 to 1449. Although he resisted at first, the Grand Prince of Moscow — Vasily II of Moscow — eventually permitted the Metropolitan of Kiev and all Rus' — Isidore of Kiev — to attend the council on condition that Isidore should return with "the rights of Divine law and the constitution of the holy Church" uninjured. The council healed the Great Schism by uniting the Roman Catholic and Eastern Orthodox churches. The union was proclaimed on 6 July 1439 in the document Laetentur Caeli (Note: Sometimes also spelled as Laetentur Coeli, Laetantur Caeli, Lætentur Cæli, Lætentur Cœli, or Lætantur Cæli, and occasionally referred to as the Act of Union or "Decree of Union".) which was composed by Pope Eugene IV and signed by the Holy Roman Emperor Sigismund and all but one of the bishops present. Some Greek bishops, perhaps feeling political pressure from the Byzantine Emperor, reluctantly accepted the decrees of the council. Other Eastern bishops, such as Isidore, did so with sincere conviction. Sylvester Syropoulos and other Greek writers charge Isidore with perjury because he accepted the union, despite his promise to Vasili II.

Following the signing of the bull, Isidore returned to the Principality of Moscow. In the Kremlin's Dormition Cathedral, Isidore read the decree of unification aloud. He also passed a message to Vasili II from the Holy See, containing a request to assist the metropolitan in spreading the Union in Rus'. Three days later, Isidore was arrested by the Grand Prince and imprisoned in the Chudov Monastery. He arranged for certain Rus' clergy to denounce the metropolitan for refusing to renounce the union with Rome. As a result, the Great Prince of Moscow voided the union in his lands and imprisoned Isidore for some time. Having adjudged Isidore to have apostatized to Catholicism, he was deposed by a local synod.

== Establishment ==
After the metropolitan throne lay vacant for seven years, the secular authorities replaced him with the Bishop of Ryazan and Murom — Jonah of Moscow. Like his immediate predecessors, he permanently resided in Moscow, and was the last Moscow-based primate of the metropolis to keep the traditional title with reference to the metropolitan city of Kiev. He was also the first metropolitan in Moscow to be appointed without the approval of the Ecumenical Patriarch of Constantinople as had been the norm. This signified the beginning of the de facto independence (autocephaly) of the Moscow (north-eastern) part of the Church.

The struggle for ecumenical union at Ferrara and Florence, while promising, never bore fruit. While progress toward union in the East continued to be made in the following decades, all hopes for a proximate reconciliation were dashed with the fall of Constantinople in 1453. Following their conquest, the Ottomans encouraged hardline anti-unionist Orthodox clerics in order to divide European Christians. Afterwards, the Muscovite principality and metropolis began to promote Moscow as the "Third Rome" and as the sole, legitimate successor to Constantinople.

Notwithstanding these events, the Ecumenical Patriarch continued to appoint metropolitans for the united Catholic and Eastern Orthodox ("Uniate") dioceses in those Ruthenian lands that were not controlled by the Tsardom of Moscow. In the Polish and Lithuanian lands, the next uniate hierarch was Gregory the Bulgarian. He was consecrated by a Latin Patriarch of Constantinople. In 1469, his appointment was also approved by the Ecumenical Patriarch of Constantinople — Dionysius I. The episcopal see of the new hierarch was located in Vilnius, the capital of the Grand Duchy of Lithuania. With the appointment of Gregory, the title was changed to Metropolitan of Kiev, Galicia and all Rus'.

== Ecclesiastical structure ==
Jonah was unable to exercise any pastoral control beyond the borders of Muscovy. In the lands of the Grand Duchy of Lithuania and the Kingdom of Poland, the rulers rejected Jonah and continued to recognise Isidore as metropolitan. The metropolis was effectively split in two; Jonah ruled from Moscow in the east while Isidore and his successors ruled the western part from Novogrudok. Dioceses:

- Urban Diocese of Moscow
- Diocese of Novgorod
- Diocese of Rostov
- Diocese of Yaroslavl
- Diocese of Smolensk
- Diocese of Kazan
- Diocese of Saratov
- Diocese of Tver
- Diocese of Vladimir

== Changes and reforms ==
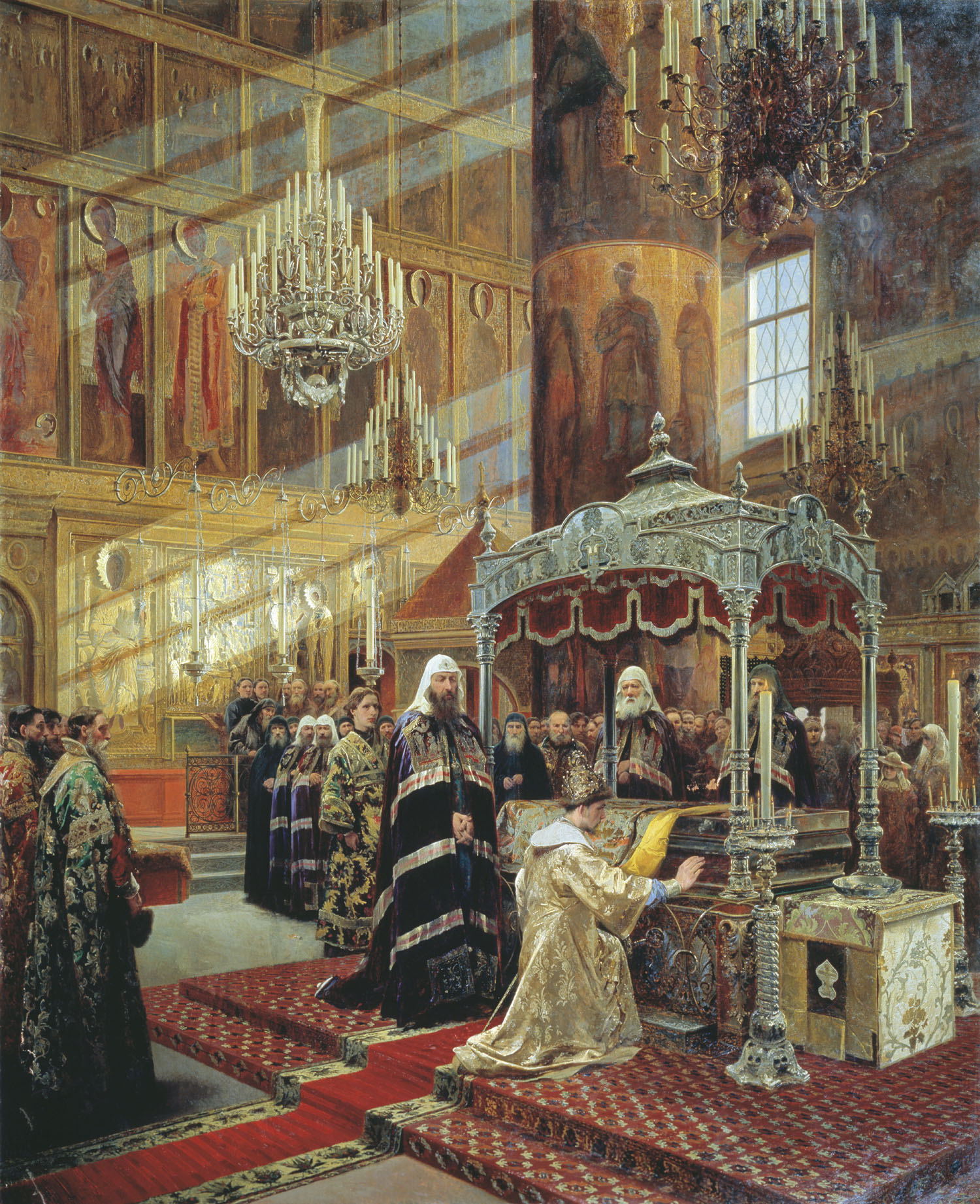
Tsar Alexis praying before the relics of Metropolitan Philip

The reign of Ivan III and his successor was plagued by numerous heresies and controversies. One party, led by Nil Sorsky and Vassian Kosoy, called for secularisation of monastic properties. They were opposed by Joseph of Volotsk, who defended ecclesiastical ownership of land and property. The sovereign's position fluctuated, but eventually he gave his support to Joseph. New sects sprang up, some of which showed a tendency to revert to the Mosaic law: for instance, the archpriest Aleksei was influenced by Zechariah the Jew and converted to Judaism.

Monastic life flourished, with two major strands co-existing until the definitive defeat of the non-possessors in 1551. The disciples of St. Sergius left the Trinity monastery near Moscow to found dozens of monasteries across northeastern Rus'. Some of the most famous monasteries were located in the Russian North, in order to demonstrate how faith could flourish in the most inhospitable lands. The richest landowners in 15th-century Muscovy and 16th-century Russia included Joseph Volokolamsk Monastery, Kirillo-Belozersky Monastery and the Solovetsky Monastery. In the 18th century, the three greatest monasteries were recognized as lavras, while those subordinated directly to the Synod were labelled stauropegic.

In the 1540s, Metropolitan Macarius convened a number of church councils, which culminated in the Hundred Chapter Council of 1551. This assembly unified Church ceremonies and duties in the whole territory of the Russian tsardom. At the demand of the Church hierarchy the government cancelled the tsar's jurisdiction over ecclesiastics.

== Disestablishment ==
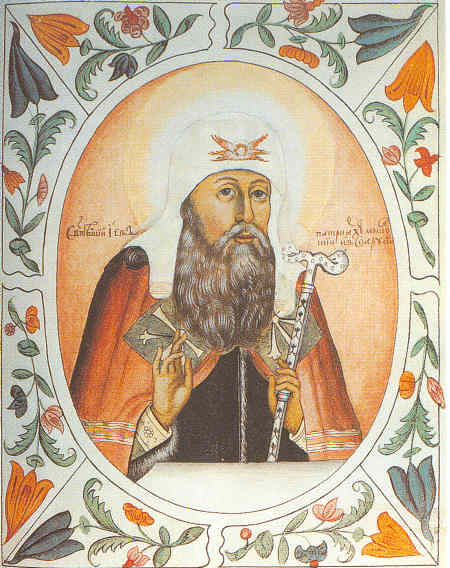
Job of Moscow

When traveling across eastern Europe from 1588 to 1589, Patriarch Jeremias II of Constantinople visited Moscow. He confirmed the de facto autocephaly of the Eastern Orthodox Church in the Tsardom of Russia. For the first time since 1448, an Ecumenical Patriarch consecrated a metropolitan in Rus' lands — Job of Moscow. At the same time, in raising the metropolis to a patriarchate — as the 'Patriarchate of Moscow and all Rus' — he effectively disestablished the metropolis. The Patriarchate was abolished by the Church reform of Peter the Great in 1721 and replaced by the Most Holy Synod, and the Bishop of Moscow came to be called a Metropolitan again.

== Bibliography ==
- Gorokhov, S. A.; Khristov, T. T. (2013). Религии народов мира. Учебное пособие [Religions of the World's Peoples: Study Guide] (in Russian). Издательство "Проспект". p. 584. ISBN 978-5-392-13917-0.
