= Censorship in the Russian Empire =

In the Russian Empire, government agencies exerted varying levels of control over the content and dissemination of books, periodicals, music, theatrical productions, works of art, and motion pictures. The agency in charge of censorship in the Russian Empire changed over time. In the early eighteenth century, the Russian emperor had direct control, but by the end of the eighteenth century, censorship was delegated to the Synod, the Senate, and the Academy of Sciences. Beginning in the nineteenth century, it fell under the charge of the Ministry of Education and finally the Ministry of Internal Affairs.

The history of censorship in the Russia began long before the emergence of the empire. The first book containing an index of prohibited works dates to the year 1073, in Kievan Rus. For several centuries these were mere translations of censorship lists from other languages; the first authentic old Russian censorship index was created only in the fourteenth century. The number of indices (as well as illegal publications) increased steadily until the beginning of the sixteenth century. Censorship first attained a kind of official status in the period of the Tsardom (1547–1721): it was encoded in law in the Stoglav and was directed against heresies, schisms, and other alleged deviations from religious dogmas and sacred texts.

Significant changes in censorship policy occurred over the course of the imperial period. The reforms of Peter I marked the beginning of the separation between ecclesiastical and secular censorship. A greater delineation of the responsibilities of censorship organizations took place in the reign of Empress Elizabeth. The period of Elizabeth's reign is also notable for the appearance of the first private journals, which greatly promoted the development of journalism in the Russian Empire. One of the most important events in the history of Russian censorship occurred in the course of Catherine II's reforms: the establishment of a censorship institute and the creation of the position of professional censor. Paul I, Catherine's son, continued the business of his predecessor, by expanding the areas that were subject to state control. Alexander I, however, reversed some of these policies and weakened the censorship. In the second half of the nineteenth century, under Alexander III, freedom of the press was once again significantly restricted.

Many classics of Russian literature were affected by censorship, and the censor was regularly represented as a grotesque figure and made the target of satire. Imperial censorship was followed by Soviet censorship, which adopted many of its features and continued until 1990.

== Historical background ==
=== Kievan Rus and the Grand Duchy of Moscow ===
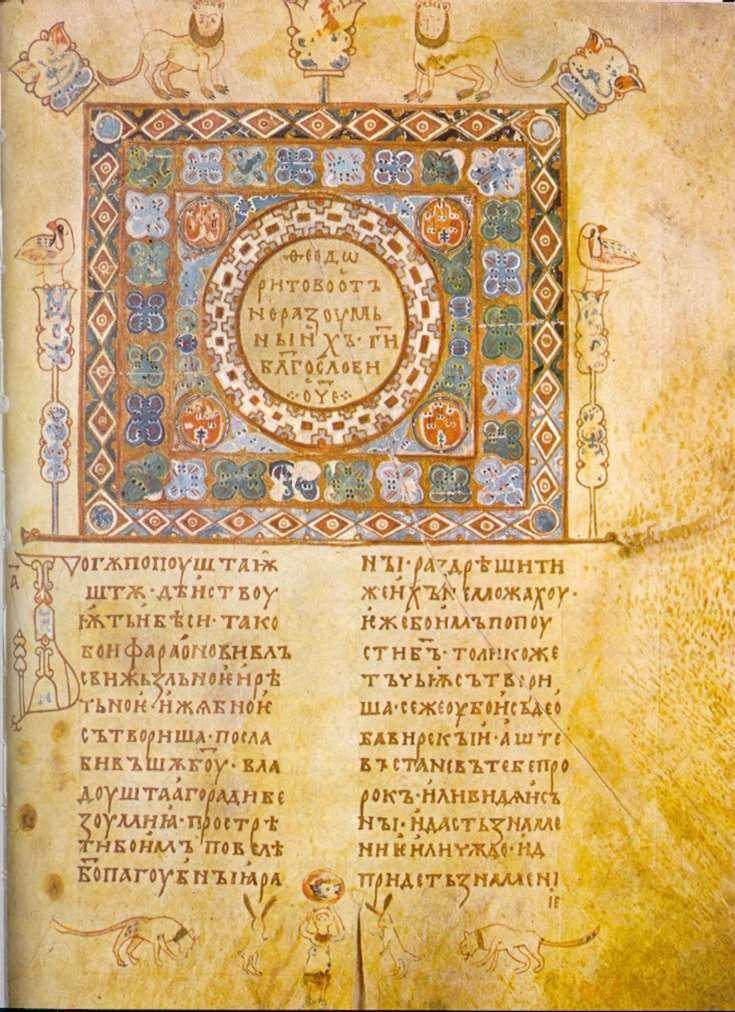
Page from the 1073 Izbornik.

Censorship in Russia dates back to long before the codified legal censorship of the Russian Empire. The first known list of banned books is found in the Izbornik of 1073, when much of what is now European Russia, Ukraine, and Belarus was governed by a polity known as Rus', centered in Kiev. The Izbornik, which also contained a large selection of Byzantine biblical, theological, and homiletic writings, was copied from a Bulgarian original that was probably created on the initiative of the Bulgarian tsar Simeon I. Most historians agree that the Russian version was made by order of Grand Duke Izyaslav Yaroslavich, though it was later reattributed to the prince Svyatoslav Yaroslavich. The list of banned books in the Izbornik did not necessarily indicate that the banned books had previously been available: N. A. Kobyak notes that out of the twenty-three apocryphal writings listed, only nine were available in Old Church Slavonic and Old East Slavic translations or adaptations.

The second translated work containing an index of prohibited books was the Taktikon by the monk Nikon Chernogorets. The historian D. Bulanin M. notes that this work was so popular in Rus' that "rarely did a book or original medieval composition not contain excerpts from the Pandects or the Taktikon". Nikon's articles were at an early date included in Slavic legal codes. They became especially popular in the late fifteenth and early sixteenth centuries: the writers of the time (Joseph Volotsky, Vassian Patrikeyev, Maximus the Greek, Zinovy Otensky, etc.) constantly refer to Nikon and include excerpts from his works.

The first native Slavic list of banned books is thought to be the index included in the Pogodinsky Nomokanon, dated to the fourteenth century. This was the first list to include works by a Slavic author, the Bulgarian priest Jeremiah, including his Story about a Red Tree and some other works. The index also prohibited religious texts that were later popular among the so-called Judaizers: Shestokryl, Logic, and Cosmography. Up until the early sixteenth century the number of indices of prohibited books steadily increased, but they were not able to hold back a massive influx of literature from Byzantium and the south Slavic countries. Kobyak argues that the expansion of the lists of books reflected the same sentiments found in the teachings of Joseph Volotsky against "unwholesome stories" and of Nilus of Sora against "ungodly" writings. But similarly to these teachings, the lists did not fully achieve their objectives.

=== Tsardom of Russia ===
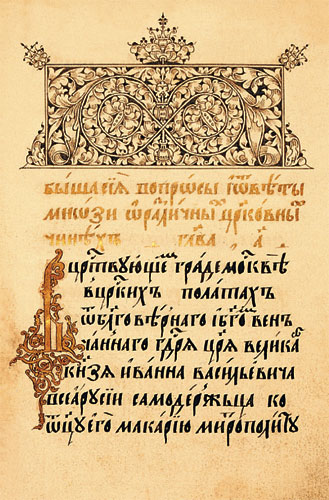
The title page of the Stoglav.

According to G. V. Zhirkov, "official" censorship of book publishers began in the Tsardom of Russia in the mid-sixteenth century, when the Stoglavy Sobor was convened to strengthen the position of the church against heretical movements. The collection of decisions taken by the council, called the Stoglav, consisted mainly of questions posed by the tsar and detailed answers given by the church officials. A section titled "On Scribes" gave the church authorities the right to confiscate unrectified manuscripts. Thus a system of prior censorship of all publications prior to sale was established. Among other changes, the council proposed a retroactive revision of the books already in circulation.

Adopted in 1551, the Stoglav was the first official censorship document in Russia. It was a reaction to the development of literacy and the emergence of an increasing number of literary works, the content of which did not always fit with church and state doctrine. In the period from 1551 to 1560 at least twelve documents and deeds were published establishing new measures and regulations in accordance with the Stoglav. The church in its new censorship capacity focused mainly on the fight against deviations from church doctrines and sacred texts, heresy, and schism. The majority of the "apostates" fled abroad, particularly to Lithuania. The pioneering printers Ivan Fyodorov and Pyotr Mstislavets also fled to Lithuania, fearing persecution by the Josephite-dominated church leadership. With the invention of the printing press, the priest-scribes who had previously dominated the book industry saw their incomes decline and erupted in protest, and as a result, Fyodorov and Mstislavets were accused of heresy. After a fire in their printing house in 1566, the publishers finally decided to leave Moscow. Fyodorov later commented, "Envy and hatred drove us from our country, fatherland, and kin to other lands, hitherto unknown."

The seventeenth century repeatedly saw bans of books created in the territory of modern Ukraine and Belarus. For example, in 1626, Lavrenty Zizany's Catechism was published in Moscow on the recommendation of the Kiev Metropolitan Job Boretsky. Many Russian clergymen believed that the Catechism contained heretical statements and in February 1627 Zizany publicly debated the matter with the editors in the Moscow Print Yard. Following the discussion, the copies of the Catechism was destroyed. In 1628, the importation of all books from the "Lithuanian press" was banned, and such books that already existed in Russian churches were withdrawn. Patriarch Nikon, who instituted significant reforms in the Russian church, presided over a massive confiscation of books published under his predecessors, as well as books written by Old Believers, who separated from the main church following his reforms. Censorship also extended to icons: in October 1667 a decree was passed that banned the amateur painting of icons and forbade the buying of such icons in shops and marketplaces.

Lubki—popular decorative prints—were also subjected to censorship because of their drawings of religious subjects, which caused outrage among the clergy. Patriarch Joachim strictly forbade their dissemination (after 1674), and confiscated lubki were burned. In 1679 Tsar Feodor III ordered the creation of a palace printing house, which was intended for the publication of the works of Symeon of Polotsk, who had taught the tsar and his brothers. The printing house was allowed to circumvent church censorship in order to support the royal favorite. In 1683, however, Patriarch Joachim managed to close the uncontrolled printing house, and after the fall of the regent Sophia Alekseyevna, the printer Sylvester Medvedev was put to death. Even before the execution, his works were banned by the Council in 1690 in Moscow and burned. Another act of censorship punishment occurred in October 1689 in Moscow, when German mystic Quirinus Kuhlmann and his successor Conrad Norderman, who were burnt alive and whose writings were labelled heretical and confiscated.

== Peter I's reforms ==
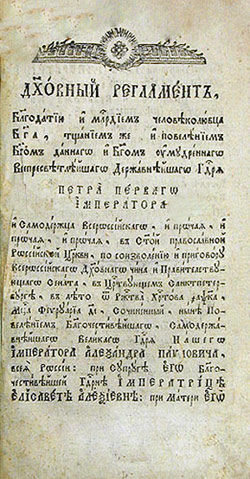
Title page of the Ecclesiastical Regulations (Духовный регламент).

The history of censorship took a new turn in response to the development of secular publishing. In 1700, Peter I gave the Amsterdam merchant Jan Thesingh a monopoly over the printing of books for Russia for fifteen years—the books were printed in Amsterdam, then imported and sold in Russia. At the same time the Petrine government set penalties for trafficking in printed materials from other foreign printers and introduced the requirement that the books had to be published "for the glory of the great sovereign" and were not to include any "abasement of our Imperial Majesty [...] and our state". In 1701 Thesingh died and his master-printer moved the operation to Russia. In 1707, Tsar Peter I bought a fully equipped printing house in Holland, including staff.

The only censor at this time was the Emperor himself, and the whole printing industry was in the hands of the state. As part of Peter's ecclesiastical reforms, he introduced legislative changes that limited the power of the church in the field of book censorship. This included a provision that forbade monks to own personal writing instruments: Peter decreed in 1701 that "Monks in cells do not have the right to write any writings; there should be no ink or paper in the cells, but in the refectory there will be a specified place for writing, with the permission of the head of the monastery". During the administration of Peter the Great, the Police Department was placed in the Amusement Palace.

Within four years, the first civil (as opposed to ecclesiastical) presses were opened St. Petersburg and Moscow. In 1718 the tsar ordered Feofan Prokopovich to develop a plan for the transformation of church administration on the model of the civil colleges. Two years later, the text of the regulations was presented to Peter. The Emperor made some modifications, and, after a discussion, the Senate unanimously adopted it without amendment. In 1721, a special censorship body, controlled by the church, was organized: the Ecclesiastical Collegium, which at the first meeting was renamed the Holy Synod. The Collegium included three bishops and seven members of the laity. The Ecclesiastical Regulations that governed the Collegium described the organization as being "under the [control of the] sovereign monarch and established by the monarch".

In the same year Peter created a new censorship body, the Izugrafskaya Palata, as a countermeasure against those who were trading "pages with various images without permission and without supervision" on the Bridge of the Savior in Moscow. The printing of engraved lubki and parsuny (portraits) was prohibited "under penalty of a strict response and ruthless fines". By 1723 this prohibition extended to "improper" royal portraits. In tandem with this, an attempt was made to conduct a similar mandatory censorship of books, but only to new publications, not canonical church writings.

In addition, Peter put an end to the monopoly of the Church in matters of printing. In 1708 he began to take steps to introduce a civil alphabet, for which he prepared the first drafts. He also invited foreign engravers to Russia to ensure the quality of the illustrations in published books. Paper mills and new printing houses were built.

During Peter's reign, the first printed newspaper appeared in Russia—Vedomosti (1702–1728)—and with it came the first censorship of periodicals. Peter personally supervised its publication and many issues saw the light only with the approval of the tsar. Despite the fact that censorship acquired a "secular" character, the church remained the authority that limited the dissemination of "objectionable literature"; thus, in 1743, the Holy Synod of the Russian Orthodox Church banned the importation of books printed in Russian, as well as the translation of foreign books. The "free presses" in Kiev and Chernigov, mostly dealing in theological literature, also fell under the supervision of the church.

== Elizabeth's reforms ==
The final separation of religious and secular censorship was brought about by the Empress Elizabeth, who ordered that "all printed books in Russia pertaining to the Church and the teachings of the Church should be published with the approbation of the Holy Synod, and civil books and other kinds of books not pertaining to the church, with the approbation of the Governing Senate". Nevertheless, according to Zhirkov, Elizabeth's censorship was somewhat disordered; A notable aspect of Elizabeth's reign was her attempts to destroy all traces of the previous short reign of her ousted predecessor, Anna Leopoldovna. Thus, with the decree of October 27, 1742, Elizabeth ordered a review of all books published in the period from October 17, 1740, to November 25, 1741.

On September 18, 1748, the Synod resolved that "wherever printed church books with one of the mentioned titles are found in someone's possession, these should be gathered ... and, taking out of them only the pages in need of correction, to send them to the printer, where they will be printed, as soon as possible, without delay or slowness". The state also strengthened its control of the import of literature from abroad; before publications in foreign languages could be sold in the Empire, they had to undergo a review, in case they mentioned undesirable persons.

At the same time the church strengthened its control over lubki pictures. The Synod demanded the control of the publication of all prayerbooks and the painting of icons. A decree on May 10, 1744, stated: "in the rural peasant huts icons are blackened and filthy; the faces on them are often not visible; this can lead to ridicule among foreign travelers entering the hut". New rules required priests to monitor the cleanliness of icons and direct the peasants in this matter. At the same time, however, intellectual activity had increased: more books were printed, new scholars arose, and the University was established as separate from the Academy. Printing was completely concentrated in the hands of the government, but a clear set of censorship laws still did not exist.

== Paul I's reforms ==
Emperor Paul I continued the work of Catherine, developing and supporting her censorship initiatives; moreover, he greatly expanded the areas that were subject to state control. A Censorship Board was organized, headed by Prince Alexander Kurakin. In the last years of the eighteenth century, 639 books were confiscated in the Russian Empire, most of them—552 volumes—at the Riga customs office. Authors affected included Goethe, Schiller, Kant, Swift, and many more.

== 19th century ==
In 1804, the Bureau of Censorship was set up in the Ministry of Education. In addition to censoring certain material, the Bureau reported the authors to the "Section Three" – the secret police. The Foreign Censorship Committee operations have been analyzed by Choldin.

== Censorship during the First World War ==
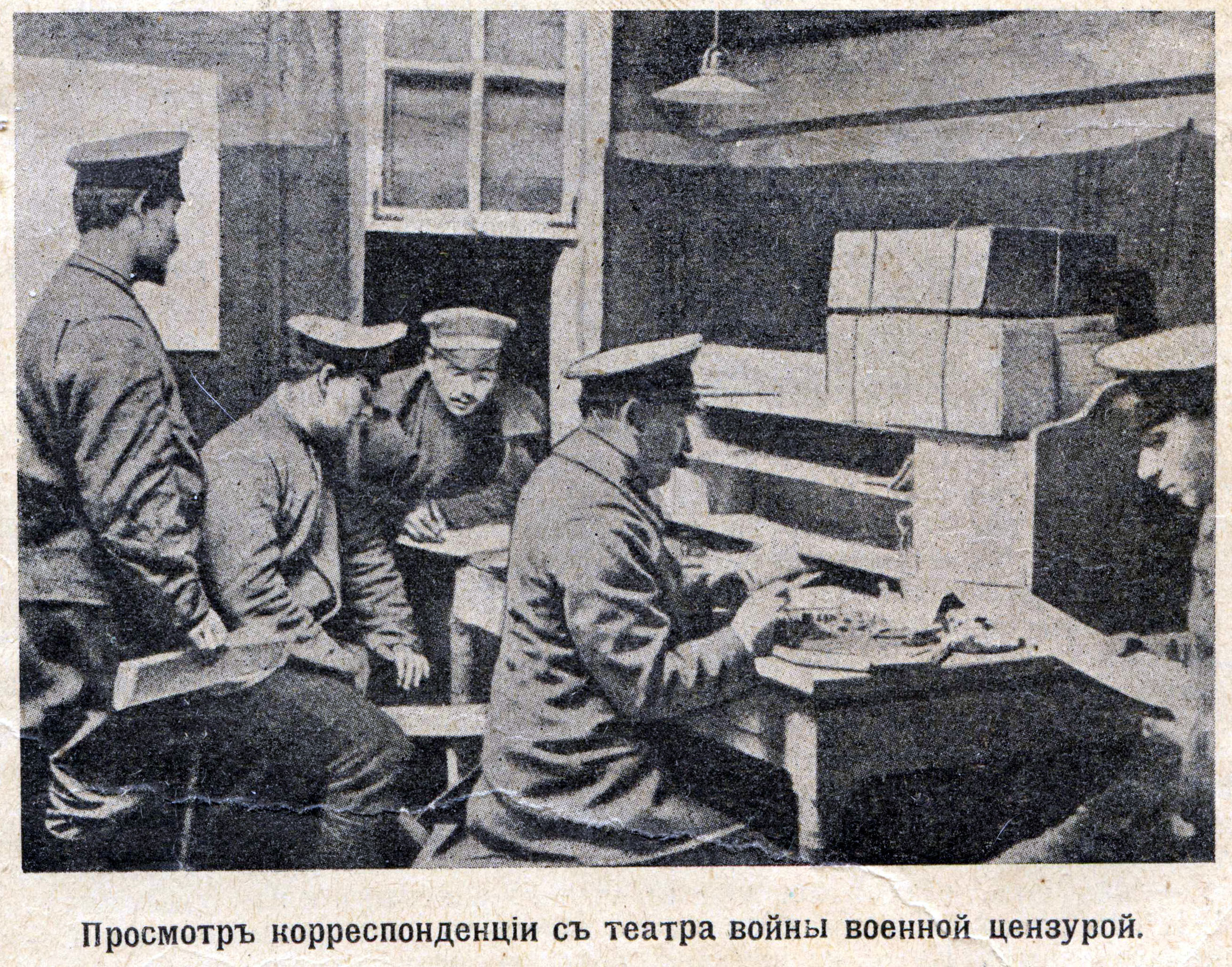
"Review of correspondence from the theater of war by military censors", an illustration from the journal Priroda i liudi, May 28, 1915.

In 1913, according to Reifman, 372 fees were imposed on the press, for a total of 140 thousand rubles, 216 issues were confiscated, 63 editors were arrested, and 20 newspapers were closed down. "Full" censorship was established only in areas of military actions, and "partial" censorship outside of those areas. The authorities, however, had the prerogative to determine the locations of military areas.

Zhirkov, however, calls this time "the flowering of Russian journalism", characterized by expanding discussions about freedom of speech and growing discontent with the repressive interior ministry MIA among publishers and journalists. On July 20, 1914, the law "Provisional regulations on military censorship" was published. The chairman of the Council of Ministers Goremykin commented, "The military censorship, examining newspaper material being prepared for publication, should evaluate the latter not only from a narrowly military point of view, but also from the point of view of general policy".

== Establishment of Soviet censorship ==
Но ты опять, растоптанное слово,
Бессмертное, свободное живёшь,
И мщение готовишь ты сурово,
И стрелы смертоносные куёшь!

But you again, the trampled word,
Live immortal and free,
And you prepare a harsh vengeance,
And you forge deadly arrows!

— Fyodor Sologub, "1917"

After the fall of the monarchy and the collapse of the empire, the institution of censorship was preserved, though transformed. In the words of Pavel Reifman: "Soviet censorship did not come out of nowhere. It was the successor of the pre-revolutionary Russian censorship, the censorship of a centuries-old autocratic Russia". On March 9, 1917, the Provisional Government eliminated the main center of tsarist censorship—the Main Committee on Matters of the Press—and introduced the post of Commissar on Matters of the Press. On May 16 the Bulletin of the Provisional Government published the legislative decree stating: "The press and the trade of printed works are free. It is not allowed to apply administrative penalties to the press."

In reality, such freedom was never fully achieved. Pyotr Wrangel wrote that with the freedom given to left-wing propaganda, right-wing newspapers were closed down and confiscated. Subsequently, in response to the crisis of the July Days, the government gave the minister of war the right to close publications that called for military rebellion and disobedience on the front, which led to the repression of Bolshevik newspapers.

== See also ==
- Sankt-Peterburgskie Vedomosti

== Bibliography ==
- Blum, Arlen (2009). Ot neolita do Glavlita. St. Petersburg: Iskusstvo Rossii. ISBN 978-5-98361-095-8.
- Blum, Arlen (2011). Russkie pisateli o tsenzure i tsenzorakh: Ot Radishcheva do nashikh dnei, 1790–1990. Odessa: Poligraf. ISBN 978-5-91868-003-2.
- Engel'gardt, Nikolai (2002). Ocherk istorii russkoi tsenzury v tsarkoi Rossii. Translated by Galushkina, M. Rudomino.
- Lemke, Mikhail (1904). Epokha tsenzurnykh reform: 1859—1865 godov. St. Petersburg: M. V. Pirozhkov.
- Mikhailov, Vladimir (2003). Rasskazy o kinematografe staroi Moskvy. Materik. ISBN 5-85646-083-9.
- Reifman, Pavel (2001–2003). Iz istorii russkoi, sovetskoi i postsovetskoi tsenzury.
- Sbornik postanovlenii i rasporiazhenii po tsenzure s 1720 po 1862 god. St. Petersburg: Tipografiia Morskogo ministerstva.
- Ruud, Charles A. (2009). Fighting Words: Imperial Censorship and the Russian Press, 1804–1906. Toronto: University of Toronto Press.
- Shirkov, V. P. (1900). Ustav o tsenzure i pechati. St. Petersburg: N. K. Martynov.
- "Ustav o tsenzure i pechati v redaktsii 1906 g."
- Zhirkov, Gennadii (2001). Istoriia tsenzury v Rossii XIX–XX veka. Moscow: Aspekt-Press. ISBN 5-7567-0145-1.
