= Paisius Yaroslavov =

Paisius Yaroslavov (Russian: Паисий Ярославов; died 1501) was the most famous monk of the Kamenny Monastery, located by Lake Kubenskoye in Vologda Oblast, Russia.

Historians do not know much about Paisiy Yaroslavov. He appears to have been a prominent figure during the reign of Ivan III. In 1478–1482, he was a hegumen at the Troitse-Sergiyeva Lavra. Archbishop Gennadius of Novgorod is known to have asked for Paisius Yaroslavov's opinion on the Second Coming. Ivan III proposed to Paisius to replace Metropolitan Gerontius upon the latter's death in 1489. During the church sobor of 1503, Paisiy Yaroslavov spoke against monastic landownership.

Paisius Yaroslavov is known to have authored Skazaniye o Spasokamenskom monastyre (Сказание о Спасокаменском монастыре, "The Tale of the Kamenny Monastery"), which tells about the history of the monastery and Christianity's struggle against paganism in the area. He also wrote O vtorom brake velikogo knyazya Vasiliya (О втором браке великого князя Василия, "On the Second Marriage of Grand Prince Vasili"), which provides valuable information on the role of different clergymen in the marriage and also contains messages from four ecumenical patriarchs and monks from Mount Athos.

== Activity ==
Together with his closest associate, Nilus of Sora, Paisiy Yaroslavov enjoyed extraordinary respect, both among the contemporary Russian hierarchy and from the grand prince. In 1489, Gennady of Novgorod, entering into a struggle with the local Sect of Skhariya the Jew and reporting them to the Rostov archbishop, asked the latter to consult Paisiy Yaroslavov and Neil Sorsky, who lived within his diocese, and attract them to the fight: it was about rumors spread among the people about the near demise of the world. Gennady himself wanted to talk with reputable and learned elders, and for this purpose even invited them to his place. With great respect for Paisius and the Nile, the grand prince himself, Ivan III of Russia. According to contemporaries, both elders “for the sake of a strong residence and virtue of the multitude had great daring to the Sovereign and were zealously acceptable and revered by him". Paisius was close to the grand princely family, being a tutor to the children of the grand prince. In 1480, together with Gerontius, Metropolitan of Moscow and Vassian Patrikeyev, Paisius interceded before the grand prince for his brother.
