= Maximus the Greek =

Greek monk and scholar (c. 1475 – c. 1556)

Saint Maximus the Greek
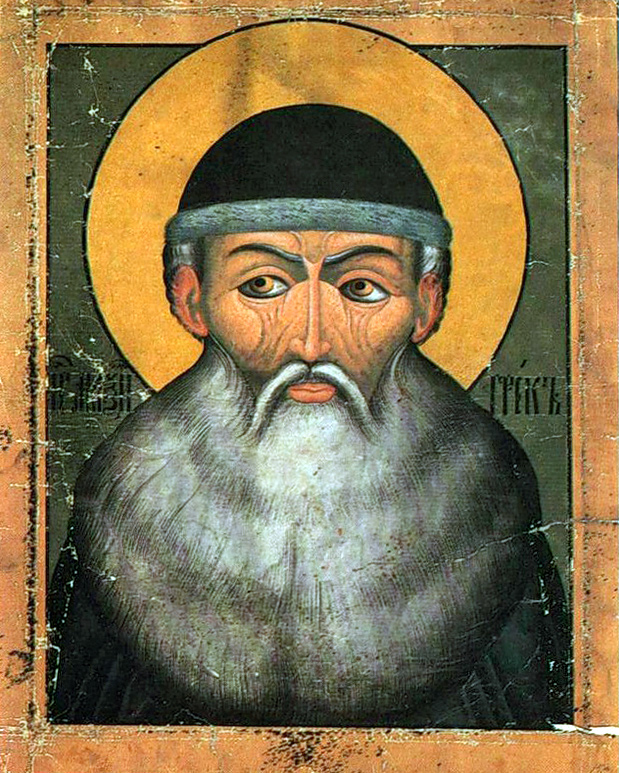
- 16th- or 17th-century icon

Venerable
- Born: c. 1475; Arta, Rumelia Eyalet, Ottoman Empire (now Greece)
- Died: c. 1556; Trinity Lavra of St. Sergius, Sergiyev Posad, Russia
- Venerated in: Eastern Orthodox Church
- Canonized: 6 June 1988, Trinity Lavra of St. Sergius by 1988 Local Council of the Russian Orthodox Church, (Patriarch Pimen I of Moscow)
- Feast: 21 January
- Attributes: Long gray or silver-coloured beard; monastic vestments

Maximus the Greek, also known as Maximos the Greek or Maksim Grek (Greek: Μάξιμος ὁ Γραικός; (Note: Romanization: Máximos o Graikós, Byzantine Greek pronunciation: [ˈmaksimos o ɣreˈkos]) Russian: Максим Грек; c. 1475 – c. 1556), was a Greek monk, publicist, writer, scholar, and translator active in Russia. (Note: Sources: Treadgold 1973, p. 14: "Maxim the Greek has been shown to be the same as Michael Trivolis, a remarkably learned monk who spent more than half his life in the West. Born at Arta in present-day Greece about 1470, he came from one of the great families of Byzantium, members of which had been friends and counselors of emperors and included a patriarch of Constantinople (Callixtus I, 1350–63)"; Kaltenbrunner 1989, p. 149: "1492, also noch zu Lebzeiten Picos, kam der junge Grieche Michael Trivolis nach Florenz, wo er in jenen Kreisen verkehrte, die dem Grafen von Mirandola zugeneigt waren. Michael Trivolis wurde Sekretär des gleichfalls philosophisch."; Fassmann & Bill 1974, pp. 471‒472: "[...] tritt ein junger griechischer Humanist, Michael Trivolis, in das Kloster San Marco ein, das schwer überschattet ist von den Folgen der Vernichtung Savonarolas. Michael hat im Hause der Reichsgrafen della Mirandola deren."; Letiche & Dmytryshyn 1990, p. 55: "As Possevino says: 'In measure that the 32 Maksim the Greek (original name Michael Trivolis, I470(?)-I557) was a Greek scholar-monk who studied for several years in Florence at the Platonic Academy, where he met many luminaries of the [...]"; Medlin 1952, p. 64: "Maximus the Greek (born Michael Trivolis, ca. 1475‒1556) had come to Moscow in 1518 in response to Grand Prince Vasili III's request to Mt. Athos monasteries for a learned translator of Greek into Slavonic. The erudite Greek monk [...]"; Speake 2018, p. 186: "It was the Russian scholar Elie Denissoff who first identified the Greek émigré Michael Trivolis with the monk Maximos the Greek and, thanks to this identification, was able to suggest that his life took the form of a diptych, of which Italy and Russia are the two leaves and Athos is the hinge."; Johnston 2013, p. 838: "Maximus the Greek, St. c. 1470‒1555 Greek Dominican friar, then Orthodox monk, polemicist, and translator in Russia."; Onasch 1967, p. 51: "Auf den Moskauer Synoden von 1525 und 1531 lief, er die von dem Griechen Maximos (Maksim Grek) durchgeführten Textrevisionen altrussischer Übersetzungen aus dem Griechischen (Patristica, Liturgica) verwerfen. Maksim kam in strengste Klosterhaft und durfte nicht einmal kommunizieren."; Trueb 2008, p. 17: "Der griechische Schriftgelehrte Maksim Grek, der seit 1518 am grossfürstlichen Hof tätig war, und russische Bücherliebhaber wie der [...]"; Thomas & Chesworth 2015, p. 135: "Maximus the Greek Date of Birth 1475 Place of Birth Arta, Greece Date of Death 1556 Place of Death Sergiyev Posad, Russia BIOGRAPHY Maximus the Greek was born Michael Trivolis in 1475 in Arta, Greece, to a family of Greek aristocrats."; Wes 1992, p. 22: "The oldest was not actually a Russian, but a Greek monk from Arta in Epirus: Maksim Grek (ca 1471–1556). His real name was Mikhail Trivolis."; Avenarius 2005, p. 119: "Maxim the Greek, already mentioned in connection with the struggle against the Markion heresy (compare VIII. 3.2), was a Greek monk, who came to Russia in 1518 at the invitation of Prince Basil III to participate in correction of the Russian liturgical books [...]"; Helleman 2004, p. 213: "Maximus the Greek (Mikhail Trivolis) (1475‒1556) Greek Orthodox monk, humanist scholar, and linguist, who received an outstanding education in Europe."; Steiris 2015, "Maximus was born as Michael Trivoles in Arta. His family came probably from Mystras, in Southern Greece. It is indicative that he signed his works as Maximus Grecus Lakedaimon, e.g., from Lakonia, the era around ancient Sparta."; Bolshakoff 1976, p. 39: "Many other people suffered with Vassian, including the remarkable Greek humanist Michael Trivilis, known in Russia as Maximus the Greek. Michael Trivolis was born of a great Byzantine aristocratic family in Arta in Epirus in 1470 [...]"; Vakalopoulos 1976, p. 157: "These included Michael Trivolis from Arta (of the prominent Byzantine family that had taken refuge on Corfu after the Capture), known as Maximos Trivolis after he was tonsured, who studied classical literature and philosophy in Venice, Padua, Ferrara, Florence, and Milan."; Treadgold 1975, p. 60: "Maxim the Greek has been identified as Michael Trivolis, a remarkably learned monk who spent more than half his life in the West. Born at Arta in present-day Greece about 1470, he came from one of the great families of Byzantium, whose members included friends and counselors of emperors and even a patriarch of Constantinople (Callixtus I, 1350–1363)."; Zajc 2011, p. 361: "The life path of Michael Trivolis led from his homeland Greece to the North of Italy where, in the town centres, he made acquaintance with the scholars of the time, and where he was involved in writing, copying and translating activities."; Ryan 2006, p. 64: "They remembered too the more recent attempts to revise the Church Slavonic translations of Greek Church texts by the born-again Greek humanist Michael Trivolis, later known in religion as Maxim, and in Russia as Maxim the Greek.") He is also called Maximos the Hagiorite (Μάξιμος ὁ Ἁγιορίτης), as well as Maximus the Philosopher. His signature was Maximus Grecus Lakedaimon (lit. Maximus the Greek of, and originating from, Lakedaimonia) and his family origins were probably from Mystras, a location in Laconia, which was the geographical site of Ancient Sparta in the Peloponnese. Canonised in 1988, he is venerated as a saint by Eastern Orthodox Christians; with a feast day on 21 January.

== Early years ==
Maximus was born Michael Trivolis (Greek: Μιχαήλ Τριβώλης, (Note: Romanization: Michail Trivolis, Byzantine Greek pronunciation: [mixaˈil triˈvolis]) Russian: Михаил Триволис) c. 1475 in Arta, then in the Ottoman Empire, the scion of a noble Greek family with ties to the Byzantine emperor in Constantinople, and originating from Sparta. Both Maximus's parents were Christian Greeks; his mother was Irene and his father, Manuel, was a voivode. Irene and Manuel left Constantinople together for Arta and the latter may have been a Byzantine military governor of Arta before the city fell to the Ottomans in 1449.

Demetrios Trivolis, Manuel's brother and Maximus's uncle, was a Greek scribe who self-identified as "a Peloponnesian from Sparta" (Greek: Πελοποννήσιος εκ Σπάρτης). In 1461–1462, Demetrios reproduced a manuscript of Plato's Timaeus while in Corfu and in 1465, he copied Plotinus's Enneads while in Crete; The Trivolis family was later associated with the Palaiologos dynasty in Mystras.

Maximus studied on the island of Corfu under the supervision of John Moschos and John Lascaris and later went with Lascaris to Florence (in 1492 or 1493) and continued his studies in Bologna, Florence, Ferrara, Milan, Padua, and Venice. While in Italy, he studied ancient languages, as well as ecclesiastic and philosophic works (especially Neoplatonism). He knew prominent figures of the Renaissance era such as the Venetian printer Aldus Manutius and made the acquaintance of scholars Angelo Poliziano, Marsilio Ficino, Pico della Mirandola, Scipio Callerges, and Fonteguerri. Maximus was also greatly influenced by the preachings of the fiery Dominican priest and reformer Girolamo Savonarola whose ashes he gathered in 1498.

== Career ==
In 1504 (according to other accounts, 1505 or early 1506), Maximus left the Dominican monastery of St. Mark and went to Mount Athos where he took monastic vows at the Monastery of Vatopedi in 1507. In 1515, Grand Prince Vasili III asked the abbot of the monastery to send him a certain monk by the name of Savva to translate a number of religious texts. Savva was so old that the abbot decided to send the energetic Maximus instead, though he had no knowledge of the Church Slavonic language. Nevertheless, the monks vouched for him, and he went to Moscow, where he was met with great honor. Upon arriving in Moscow in 1518, Maximus headed the movement of religious reform. In 1518, Maximus met Prince Kurbskii, who later wrote about Maximus and his time in Moscow in Skazanie o Maksime Filosofe ("The Tale of Maxim the Philosopher"). In this work, Kurbskii describes a meeting between Maximus and Vasili III whereupon Maximus was astonished at the countless multitudes of Greek books displayed at Vasili III's court. Maximus assured the prince that he had never seen so many Greek works in Greece itself. This testimony is the earliest known reference of a collection of ancient manuscripts belonging to the Russian tsars which has never been found, also referred to as The Lost Library of the Moscow Tsars. This lost library later became a favorite research topic of early 20th century Russian archaeologist Ignatius Stelletskii.

== Assignment to Moscow ==
Maximus's first major work in Russia was a translation of the Psalter together with the Russian translators (including the scholar Dmitry Gerasimov) and scriveners, which would be solemnly approved by the Russian clergy and the grand prince himself. After Vasili III rejected his request to go home, Maximus continued to work on translations and correcting the books for divine service. Observing the "defects" and injustices of Muscovite life, which seemed to him in direct opposition to his Christian ideals, Maximus began to expose them and criticize the authorities, attracting different people with similar views, such as Ivan Bersen-Beklemishev, Vassian Patrikeyev, and others. With regards to the question of monastic estates, which had already divided the Russian clergy into two antagonistic camps (the Possessors and the Non-Possessors), Maximus took sides with Nilus of Sors and his startsy, who headed the Non-Possessors camp. This would make him one of the worst enemies of the Josephites, who stood for the right of the monasteries to own land. Maximus and his followers discussed freely the shortcomings of Russia's internal and foreign policies, criticized the lifestyle of the Russian clergy, exploitation of peasants, and the system of supporting local authorities by "milking" the peasants (so-called kormleniye).

== Imprisonment ==
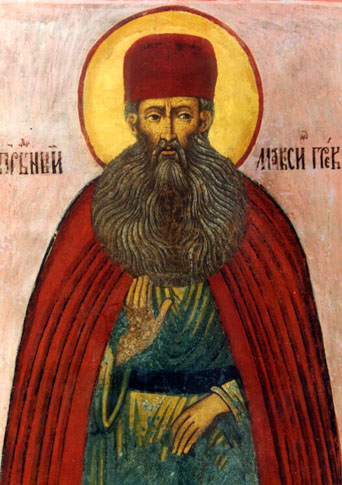
Maximus the Greek has been held in the greatest repute by Old Believers, and his images are normally featured in every Old Believer church.

Maximus's relations with Vassian Patrikeyev, Ivan Bersen-Beklemishev, and Turkish ambassador Skinder, Metropolitan Daniel's hostility towards him, and Maximus's own negative attitude towards Vasili III's intention to divorce Solomonia Saburova decided his fate. A sobor (council) in 1525 accused Maximus of nonconformism and heresy based on his views and translations of ecclesiastic books, disregarding his incomplete knowledge of Russian and obvious mistakes on the part of the Russian scriveners (his improper use of the imperfect tense was used to imply that he no longer believed the Holy Spirit was the Third Person of the Trinity but only had been temporarily). He was then exiled to the Joseph-Volokolamsk Monastery and placed in a dungeon without the right to take communion or correspond. Maximus's "irritating" behavior at the monastery, newly discovered mistakes in his translations, and old suspicions of his unscrupulous relations with the now dead Turkish ambassador were all used against him once again at a new sobor in 1531. Worn out by the harsh conditions of his imprisonment, Maximus acknowledged some minor mistakes in his translations and excessive wine drinking. Finally, the sobor banned him from receiving communion and exiled him to the Otroch Monastery in Tver, where he would spend his next twenty years. The Patriarch of Antioch, Patriarch of Constantinople, and Patriarch of Jerusalem all attempted to negotiate Maximus's release with the Russian authorities, but to no avail. He himself pleaded with Ivan the Terrible (r. 1547–1584) and Metropolitan Macarius for his freedom. Moscow was afraid of Maximus's ability to expose wrongdoings and criticize the powers that be and, therefore, was reluctant to let him go. In 1551 (or 1553 according to other accounts), Maximus was transferred to the Troitse-Sergiyeva Lavra at the solicitation of some boyars and Hegumen Artemiy of the lavra. That same year, according to some accounts, the tsar is said to have visited Maximus during his pilgrimage to Kirillo-Belozersky Monastery; Maximus is described as having advised the ruler to take care of the families of soldiers who died in the conquest of Kazan instead of merely praying for the dead. In 1554, Maximus was invited to join a sobor, which would deal with the heresy of Matvei Bashkin, but he refused, being wary of getting entangled in this case.

== Death ==
Maximus died in 1556 in Troitse-Sergiyeva Lavra, Sergiyev Posad. He is buried in the Refectory Church in the Lavra.

== Legacy ==
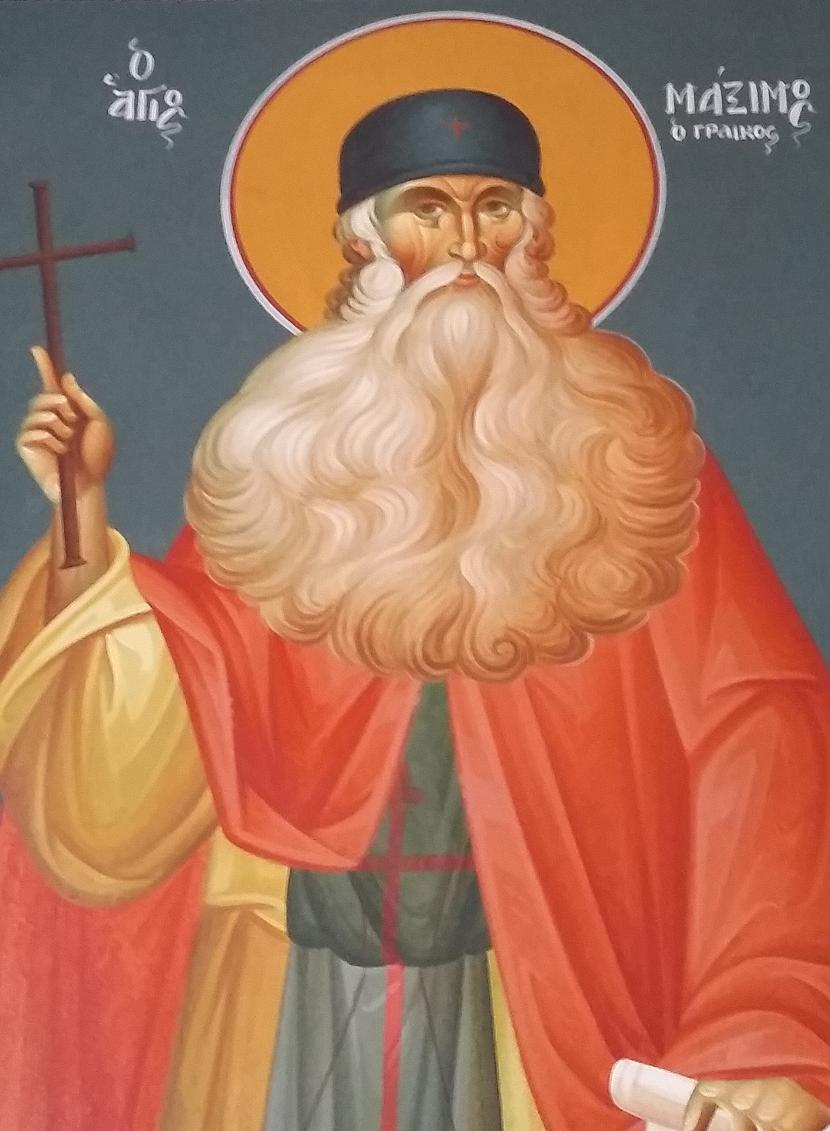
Hagiographical fresco of Saint Maximus the Greek (Graikos) in the Greek Orthodox tradition.

Maximus played an important role in shaping Russian Christian tradition; he left a voluminous body of original writings and translations into Russian Church Slavonic. He spent a great deal of energy and ink in his efforts to prove his innocence and Orthodoxy. He interpreted and explained for his Muscovite readers a large number of points of ancient and Biblical history, Orthodox Church practice and teachings, and features of the contemporary world outside of Muscovy. For example, he was the first to bring the discovery of the New World to the attention of Muscovite readers. He is considered a saint by the Eastern Orthodox Church, which commemorates him on 21 January.

== Bibliography ==
- "Максим Грек" . Brockhaus and Efron Encyclopedic Dictionary (in Russian). 1906.
- Akopyan, Ovanes (2020). "11 Europe or Not? Early Sixteenth-Century European Descriptions of Muscovy and the Russian Responses". In Detering, Nicholas; Marsico, Clementina; Walser-Bürgler, Isabella (eds.). Contesting Europe: Comparative Perspectives on Early Modern Discourses on Europe, 1400–1800. Leiden and Boston: BRILL. pp. 248–274. ISBN 978-90-04-41471-6.
- Arans, David (1983). "A Note on the Lost Library of the Moscow Tsars". The Journal of Library History. 18 (3). The University of Texas Press: 304–316. JSTOR 25541406.
- Avenarius, Alexander (2005). "The Byzantine Struggle over the Icon". Studia Historica Slovaca. 23. Bratislava: Wydavatel'stvo Slovenskej akadémie vied. ISBN 978-80-88880-66-0.
- Bandini, Michele (1991). "I Memorabili di Senofonte fra il Bessarione, Isidoro di Kiev e Pier Vettori". Bollettino dei Classici. 12. Accademia Nazionale dei Lincei: 83–92.
- Bolshakoff, Serge (1976). Russian Mystics. Kalamazoo, MI: Cistercian Publications, Inc. ISBN 9780879079260.
- Busse, Adolfus, ed. (1897). Commentaria in Aristotelem Graeca. Vol. IV, Pars V Ammonius De Interpretatione. Berlin: Typis Et Impensis Georgii Reimeri.
- Casetti Brach, Carla (1975–1976). "Copisti greci del Medioevo e del Rinascimento, aggiunte". Επετηρίς Εταιρείας Βυζαντινών Σπουδών. 42. Εταιρεία Βυζαντινών Σπουδών: 234–252.
- Denissoff, Élie (1943). Maxime le Grec et l'Occident: contribution á l'histoire de la pensée religieuse et philosophique de Michel Trivolis. Paris: Desclée, de Brouwer.
- Encyclopædia Britannica, Inc. (2002). The New Encyclopædia Britannica (Volume 7) (15th ed.). Chicago, IL: Encyclopædia Britannica. ISBN 0-85229-787-4.
- Fassmann, Kurt; Bill, Max (1974). Die Grossen der Weltgeschichte: Boccaccio bis Palladio. Zürich: Kindler.
- Golubinskii, E. E. (1900). Istoriia Russkoi Tserkvi (Volume 2, Part 1) Tserkvi. Moscow, Russia: Universitetskaia Tipografiia.
- Graux, Charles Henri (1880). Essai sur les origines du fonds grec de l'Escurial: épisode de l'histoire de la renaissance des lettres en Espagne, par Charles Graux. Paris: F. Vieweg.
- Grumel, V. (1944). "La personnalité de Maxime le Grec". Revue des études byzantines. 2 (1): 255–260. doi:10.3406/rebyz.1944.919.
- Haney, Jack V. (1973). From Italy to Muscovy, The Life and Works of Maxim the Greek. Munich: Wilhelm Fink. ISBN 9783770509256.
- Helleman, Wendy E. (2004). The Russian Idea: In Search of a New Identity. Bloomington, IN: Slavica Publishers Indiana University. ISBN 978-0-89357-314-0.
- Johnston, William M. (2013). Encyclopedia of Monasticism. London and New York: Routledge (Taylor & Francis Group). ISBN 978-1-136-78716-4.
- Kaltenbrunner, Gerd-Klaus (1989). Vom Geist Europas: Mutterland Abendland. Asendorf: Muth-Verlag. ISBN 978-3-89182-039-1.
- Kovalevsky, Pierre (1976). Saint Sergius and Russian Spirituality. Crestwood, NY: St. Vladimir's Seminary Press. ISBN 0-91383-624-9.
- Lambrou, Spyros P. (1969) [1907]. "ΛΑΚΕΔΑΙΜΟΝΙΟΙ ΒΙΒΛΙΟΓΡΑΦΟΙ ΚΑΙ ΚΤΗΤΟΡΕΣ ΚΩΔΙΚΩΝ ΚΑΤΑ ΤΟΥΣ ΜΕΣΟΥΣ ΑΙΩΝΑΣ ΚΑΙ ΕΠΙ ΤΟΥΡΚΟΚΡΑΤΙΑΣ". Νέος Ελληνομνήμων. 4 (3). Athens: Bas. N. Grégoriadès: 303–357.
- Letiche, John M.; Dmytryshyn, Basil (1990). "Križanić's Memorandum on the Mission to Moscow, 1641". The Slavonic and East European Review. 68 (1). University College London, School of Slavonic and East European Studies: 41‒68. JSTOR 4210167.
- Lorusso, Vito (2016). "Locating Greek Manuscripts through Paratexts: Examples from the Library of Cardinal Bessarion and other Manuscript Collections". In Ciotti, Giovanni; Lin, Lin (eds.). Tracing Manuscripts in Time and Space through Paratexts. Berlin and Boston: Walter de Gruyter. pp. 223–268. ISBN 9783110479010.
- Lyna, Frédéric (1950). Scriptorium: International Review of Manuscript Studies. E. Story-Scientia.
- McGuckin, John Anthony (2010). The Encyclopedia of Eastern Orthodox Christianity. John Wiley & Sons. ISBN 978-1-4443-9254-8.
- Medlin, William K.; Patrinelis, Christos G. (1971). Renaissance Influences and Religious Reforms in Russia: Western and Post-Byzantine Impacts on Culture and Education (16th–17th Centuries). Genève, Switzerland: Librairie Droz. ISBN 2-600-03894-9.
- Medlin, William K. (1952). Moscow and East Rome: A Political Study of the Relations of Church and State in Muscovite Russia. Genéve: Delachaux et Niestl.
- Nicol, Donald M. (1998). Cavanagh, W. G.; Walker, S. E. C. (eds.). "Byzantine Mistra—Sparta in the mind". British School at Athens Studies. 4, Sparta in Laconia: Proceedings of the 19th British Museum Classical Colloquium held with the British School at Athens and King's and University Colleges, London 6–8 December 1995: 157–159. JSTOR 40960268.
- Onasch, Konrad (1967). Grundzüge der Russischen Kirchengeschichte. Göttingen: Vandenhoeck & Ruprecht. ISBN 978-3-525-52352-0.
- Pagani, Fabio (2009). "Damnata Verba: Censure di Pletone in alcuni codici platonici". Byzantinische Zeitschrift. 102 (1). B.G. Teubner: 167–202. doi:10.1515/BYZS.2009.008. S2CID 192028553.
- Powicke, Frederick Maurice (1947). Three Lectures: Given in the Hall of Balliol College, Oxford, in May 1947. Oxford: Oxford University Press.
- Rozemond, Keetje (1966). "Aldus Manutius' Neakademia, Michael Trivolis en de Russische culturele centra in de zestiende eeuw". Het Boek. 37. M. Nijhoff: 163–177.
- Ryan, William Francis (2006). Russian Magic at the British Library: Books, Manuscripts, Scholars, Travellers. London: British Library. ISBN 978-0-7123-4983-3.
- Sartori, Franco (1986). "Un poeta corfiota nella Venezia del sec. XVI". Archivio Veneto. 127: 31–46.
- Speake, Graham (2018). A History of the Athonite Commonwealth: The Spiritual and Cultural Diaspora of Mount Athos. Cambridge: Cambridge University Press. ISBN 978-1-108-42586-5.
- Staikos, Konstantinos Sp. (1998). Charta of Greek Printing: Fifteenth Century. Cologne: Dinter. ISBN 3-924794-19-7.
- Steiris, Georgios (2015). "Maximus the Greek: Born: Arta c.1470/1475 Died: Sergiyev Posad 1556". In Sgarbi, Marco (ed.). Encyclopedia of Renaissance Philosophy. Switzerland: Springer International Publishing Switzerland. pp. 1–3. doi:10.1007/978-3-319-02848-4_150-1. ISBN 978-3-319-02848-4.
- Thomas, David; Chesworth, John A., eds. (2015). Christian-Muslim Relations. A Bibliographical History: Volume 7. Central and Eastern Europe, Asia, Africa and South America (1500‒1600). Leiden and Boston: BRILL. ISBN 978-90-04-29848-4.
- Treadgold, Donald W. (1975). "The Meeting of Moscow and Rome in the Reign of Vasilij III". In Blane, Andrew (ed.). The Religious World of Russian Culture. The Hague and Paris: Mouton. pp. 55–74. ISBN 978-3-11-103418-8.
- Treadgold, Donald W. (1973). The West in Russia and China: Religious and Secular Thought in Modern Times (Volume I: Russia, 1472‒1917). Cambridge: Cambridge University Press. ISBN 978-0-521-09725-3.
- Trueb, Isabel (2008). Studien zum Frühen Russischen Buchdruck. Zürich: Theologischer Verlag Zürich. ISBN 978-3-290-22000-6.
- Vakalopoulos, Apostolos Euangelou (1976). The Greek Nation, 1453‒1669: The Cultural and Economic Background of Modern Greek Society. New Brunswick, NJ: Rutgers University Press. ISBN 978-0-8135-0810-8.
- Vakalopoulos, Apostolos Euangelou (1970). Origins of the Greek Nation: The Byzantine Period, 1204-1461. New Brunswick, NJ: Rutgers University Press. ISBN 9780813506593.
- Wells, Colin (2007). Sailing from Byzantium: How a Lost Empire Shaped the World. New York: Bantam Dell. ISBN 978-0-553-38273-0.
- Wes, Marinus Antony (1992). Classics in Russia 1700‒1855: Between Two Bronze Horsemen. Leiden, New York and Köln: E.J. BRILL. ISBN 90-04-09664-7.
- Wieczynski, Joseph L. (1976). The Modern Encyclopedia of Russian and Soviet History (Volume 21). Gulf Breeze, Florida: Academic International Press. ISBN 0-87569-064-5.
- Zajc, Neža (2011). Krogozor slovanske Besede. Preizkušnja renesanènega humanizma skozi prerez opusov besedil Primoža Trubarja in Maksima Greka. Ljubljana: Založba ZRC. ISBN 978-961-254-312-9.
- Zakythinos, Dionysios A. (1951). "La Société dans le Despotat de Morée". L'Hellénisme Contemporain: 101–126.
