= Polyphony (disambiguation) =

Polyphony is a musical texture consisting of two or more independent melodic voices.

Polyphony may also refer to:

- Polyphony (choir)
- Polyphony (literature)
- Polyphony (Russian Orthodox liturgy)
- Polyphony and monophony in instruments
- Polyphony (magazine)
- Polyphony (Weiner), sculpture

== See also ==
- Polyphony Digital, a video game company owned by Sony
- Polyphonic (producer), an American record producer
- Polyphonia, a ballet choreograph by Christopher Wheeldon
- Monophony (disambiguation)
