= Non-possessors =

16th-century movement in the Russian Orthodox Church

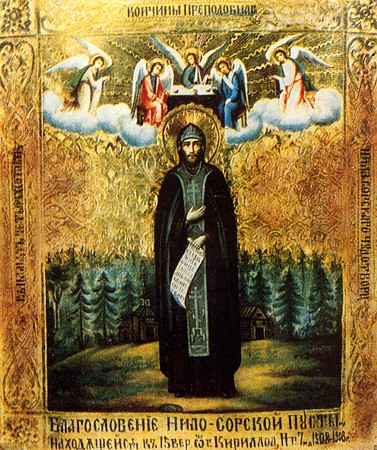
Icon of Saint Nil Sorsky, a leader of the non-possessors (1908)

The non-possessors (Russian: нестяжатели, romanized: nestyazhateli) belonged to a movement in the Russian Orthodox Church in the early 16th century that opposed ecclesiastical land-ownership. It was led by Nilus of Sora (1433–1508) and later Maximus the Greek (c. 1475–1556) and others. They were opposed to the possessors (styazhateli) led by Joseph of Volokolamsk (1439/1440–1515), whose followers were known as the Josephites and believed that monastic possessions helped monks. The non-possessors were finally defeated at the Stoglav Synod in 1551. Both Nilus and Joseph were canonized.

The non-possessors are similar to other movements in Christianity, the Spiritual Franciscans for example, in that they believed that ownership of land and the Church's possession of wealth in general had corrupted the church. The non-possessors also believed that the Church should not forcibly convert or persecute heretics or pagans, but should patiently work to convert them to the true faith.

== History ==
Following the Sobor of 1503, the terms non-possessors (nestyazhateli) and possessors (styazhateli) came to be used. Joseph and his followers refused to accept the repentance of heretics following their apprehension, unlike the Transvolgan Elders, including Vassian Patrikeyev. A dispute arose as Joseph of Volokolamsk (1439/1440–1515) stressed the importance of the monasteries receiving sufficient endowments to fulfil social responsibilities, while the other party led by Nilus of Sora (1433–1508) stressed the spiritual aspects of monasticism.

== See also ==
- Heresy of the Judaizers
- Strigolniki
