= Monophony (disambiguation) =

In music, monophony is the simplest of textures, consisting of melody without accompanying harmony.

Monophony or monophonic may also refer to:

- Monophony (Russian Orthodox liturgy), consecutive singing of chants one by one, as opposed to polyphony (simultaneous singing)
- Monaural, single-channel sound reproduction, also known as monophonic sound reproduction
- Monophonic synthesizer, a synthesizer that produces one note at a time, also known as monosynth
- Polyphony and monophony in instruments

== See also ==
- Polyphony (disambiguation)
