= Sobor of 1503 =

Sobor of 1503, also known as the "sobor of widowed priests" (Russian: собор о вдовых попах) was a sobor of the Russian Orthodox Church, which was held in Moscow between August and September 1503. The sobor was convened at the initiative of Simon, Metropolitan of Moscow. The main task of the sobor was to resolve a number of disciplinary matters in respect of which it issued two rulings. However the Sobor is primarily remembered as dealing with the controversy of the 'nestyazhateli' or non-possessors. The non-possessors, led by Nilus of Sora opposed monastic landownership. They were faced by the possessors (styazhateli), led by Joseph of Volotsk, who asserted that monasteries needed lands to finance their activities. The debate between the possessors and non-possessors would continue until the Stoglav Sobor in 1551.

== Attendants ==
The Sobor was attended by Grand Prince Ivan III, his sons Vasily, Dmitry of Uglich, as well as the revered St Neil Sora, St Joseph of Volokolamsk and Serapion, then the abbot of Trinity-Sergius Monastery. With many other abbots of monasteries, archimandrites and other spiritual and secular people.

== The first stage of the cathedral: the question of representation duties ==
The 1503 Sobor, in contrast to Vladimir's Sobor of 1274 limited the size of representation duties levied when issuing letters of representation. The Council of 1503 condemned the charging of fees for the ordination of priests as simony, though the practice had been approved by the Moscow Council of 1270 and had been practiced in the Byzantine church for years before that. As a result of the condemnation, Archbishop Gennady of Novgorod was condemned the following year for simony and removed from office. The council took the view that the violation of this rule, threatened to overthrow of dignity of consecration. This judgement applying to all degrees of the priesthood. Additionally a conciliar definition of "resorting to levying about bribes from clergy for ordination" was signed. Subsequently the Stoglavy Cathedral restoring representation charging fees, reversed this decision. The Sobor also confirmed the lower limit for the dedication of thirty years as a priest, twenty-five years for a deacon and twenty years for a Subdeacon.

== Question of widowed priests ==
Another group of questions concerned the morality of priests, particularly widowed priests. Based on certain sections of the New Testament it was believed that a priest could be only be "the husband of one wife". However widowed priests, unafraid to break the church statutes, often entered into a second marriage. Another apparent breach related to the Judaic heretics demanded action.

Recalling metropolitans Saints Peter and Photios, mentioning the apostolic rule, however, without naming them the council decreed widowed priests the same as those entered into a second marriage, be defrocked priests and lose all clerical rights. Others may serve in the choir, one-fourth of what the employee gets in their place the priest may receive Communion at the altar, wearing a stole.

Another decree concerned the so-called "double" monasteries in which monks lived together both sexes. Cathedral insisted on the necessity of their settlement . In the women's monasteries also should serve the secular clergy. Another decree forbade serve Liturgy drunk and hungover.

Not all met positively ban serve widowed priests. Unobjectionable indiscriminately with which the Cathedral approached this issue .

The initiator of this decision believe St. Joseph, whose writing has been included in the text "Stoglavy" (Chapter 79). In this brief paper Joseph objected to those who refer to the apostolic decree contradicts the rules.
