= Ivan Bersen-Beklemishev =

Russian diplomat (died 1525)

Ivan Nikitich Beklemishev, nicknamed Bersen ("gooseberry") (Russian: Ива́н Ники́тич Берсе́нь-Беклеми́шев) (? - 1525) was one of the most prominent Russian diplomats and statesmen during the reigns of Ivan III and Vasili III.

During the reign of Ivan III, Beklemishev was sent on a number of important diplomatic missions. In 1490, he acted as a personal bodyguard for German ambassador Georg Delator, who had come to Moscow at the request of Maximilian I. The latter was seeking the hand of Ivan III’s daughter and an alliance against the Polish king. In 1492, Beklemishev was sent as an ambassador to Casimir IV. In 1502, he held negotiations with a Crimean khan Meñli I Giray. Ivan Beklemishev enjoyed a great amount of respect from Ivan III and had great influence over the royal court and Boyar Duma. A number of disgraced princes, such as Vasili Mikhailovich Udaliy (Prince of Vereya), used to turn to Beklemishev for mediation and protection in their dealings with the grand prince.

During the reign of Vasili III, Beklemishev began to fall into disgrace as a man known for his stern disposition and oppositionary opinions (e.g., he believed that the right to discuss the affairs of the state was the most essential prerogative of the boyardom). A major confrontation between Beklemishev and Vasili III took place after he had dared to criticize him on a number of issues, such as his intention to divorce Solomonia Saburova, and his unwillingness to consult with the Duma (as opposed to Ivan III) over the affairs of the state. At one point during a debate in the Duma, Vasili III told Beklemishev: "Get out of my sight, you smerd, I don’t need you anymore!". After this incident, Ivan Beklemishev was constrained to retire from the royal court and the affairs of the state. Later, he began to express his dissatisfaction with the tsar’s policies in his discussions with Maximus the Greek, for which he would pay dearly. In 1525, Ivan Beklemishev was executed for his ties with Maximus the Greek.

One of the Kremlin towers was named after Ivan Bersen-Beklemishev because his house had been adjacent to the tower from the Kremlin side.
