= Cyril of Beloozero =

Russian monk and saint (1337–1427)

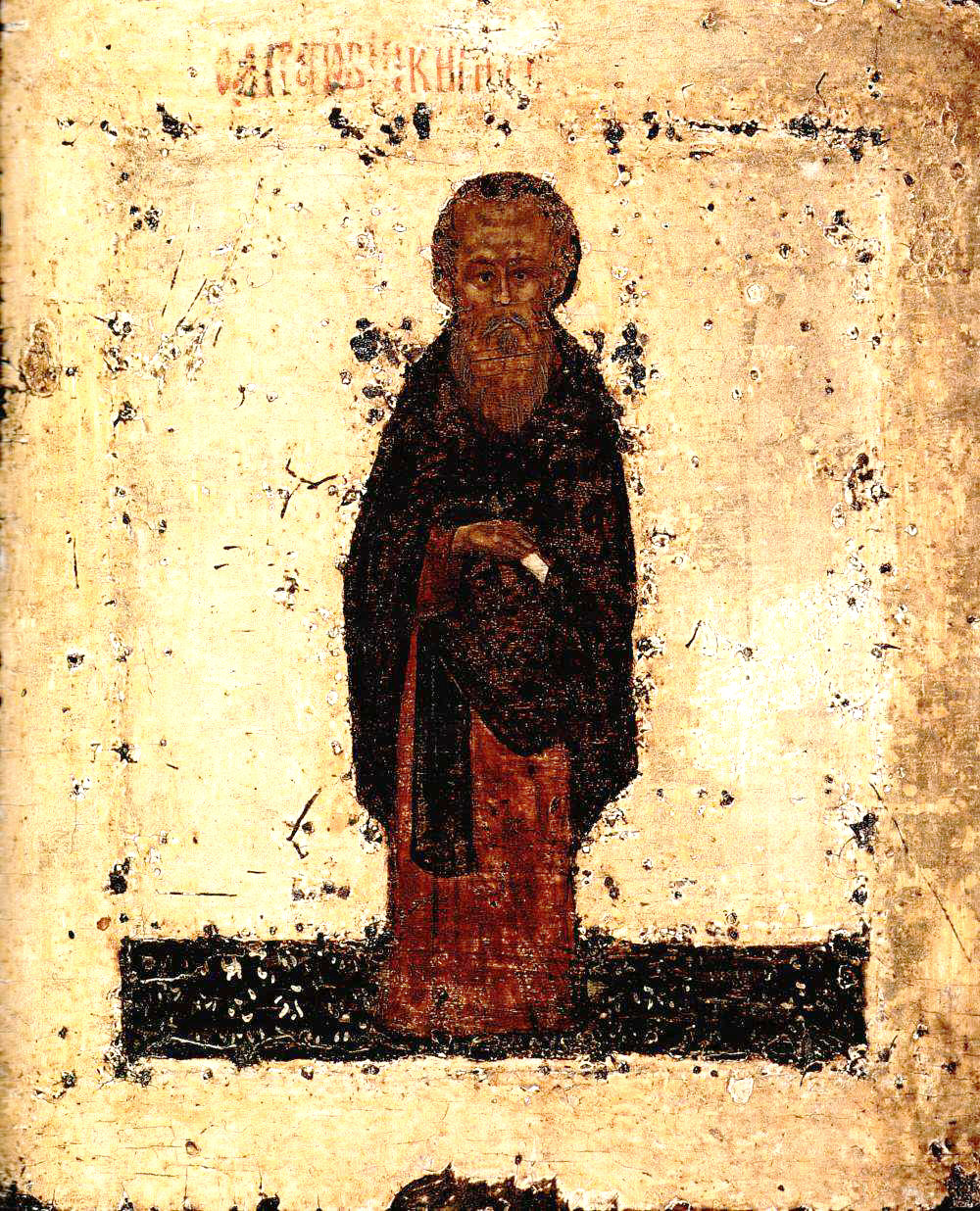
Icon of Cyril, presumably painted by Dionisius Glushitsky, now located in the Tretyakov Gallery, Moscow (1424)

Cyril of Beloozero (Russian: Кирилл Бело(е)зерский, romanized: Kirill Belo(e)zersky; secular name: Kozma; 1337 – 1427) was a Russian monk. He is venerated as a saint by the Russian Orthodox Church. Cyril was a disciple of Sergius of Radonezh. In 1397, he founded the Kirillo-Belozersky Monastery in northern Russia, in present-day Vologda Oblast.

== Biography ==
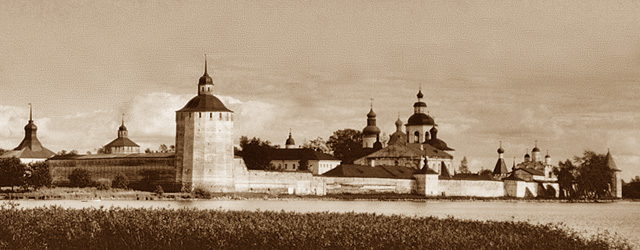
Kirillo-Belozersky Monastery

Cyril was born as Kozma in Moscow in 1337. His origins are not entirely clear, but he was in any case close to the boyar family of Velyaminov. Cyril's parents died when he was a child. Around 1380, he became a monk in the Simonov Monastery and took the name of Cyril (Kirill).

In the monastery, he got in contact with Sergius of Radonezh. In 1387, the archimandrite of the Simonov Monastery, Feodor, was appointed as a bishop of Rostov, and Cyril became his successor. However, he soon realized that the position of archimandrite required too much involvement in public affairs, and at first he resigned, then moved to a neighboring monastery as an ordinary monk, before deciding to move to a deserted place where he could pray in peace. Together with St. Therapont, previously the monk of the same monastery, Cyril left for Lake Beloye. On arrival, following the advice of Sergius of Radonezh, he first dug a cave, and then built a wooden Assumption chapel and a loghouse for other monks. Therapont, who found the restriction imposed by Cyril too strict, left within a year and founded nearby the Ferapontov Monastery. In what became Kirillo-Belozersky Monastery, Cyril established a very strict order.

The monastery grew and later became the largest monastery of northern Russia. Cyril, as the first hegumen, arranged purchases of large areas of land by the monastery.

Cyril died in the monastery in 1427, at the age of 90. Makaryev Sobors of the Russian Orthodox Church recognized him as a saint in 1547.

At present, there are several churches in Russia bearing the name of Cyril.

His day is marked by Russian Orthodox Church on June 9.

== Sources ==
- "Кирилл, преподобный белозерский" . Brockhaus and Efron Encyclopedic Dictionary (in Russian). 1906.
