= Polyphony (Russian Orthodox liturgy) =

In the Russian Orthodox liturgy of the 16th–18th centuries, polyphony (Russian: многогласие, romanized: mnogoglasiye, lit. 'many-voicing'), sometimes polyvocality, was a tradition of performing several parts of the church service in the same place at the same time; in particular, to singing several different chants simultaneously to save time. Despite being banned in favor of monophony (Russian: единогласие, romanized: edinoglasiye, lit. 'single-voicing'), i.e. singing the chants one by one consecutively, it persisted for quite some time.

== History ==
The tradition of polyphony arose in the early 16th century, when chants transformed from being performed recitatively to being elaborately sung. At the same time, the strict service regimen adopted in monasteries had become the norm in ordinary churches. As a result the full church service had gradually become extremely long. Polyphony was introduced under the excuse of saving the time and stamina of laymen; however, it had gradually evolved to an absurdity where, according to complaints, up to six chants were sung at the same time, with cantors trying to shout over each other. The Stoglavy Sobor had forbidden polyphony in the mid-16th century, but it continued for some time after the proscription. It is known that Patriarch Hermogenes of Moscow called for forbidding it, while the 17-th century Patriarch Joasaphus I of Moscow called for limiting it to only two voices. The monophony was made official only at the 1651 sobor. It appears that polyphony went out of use only by the times of Peter the Great.
