= Kirillo-Belozersky Monastery =

Russian Orthodox monastery in Kirillov, Russia

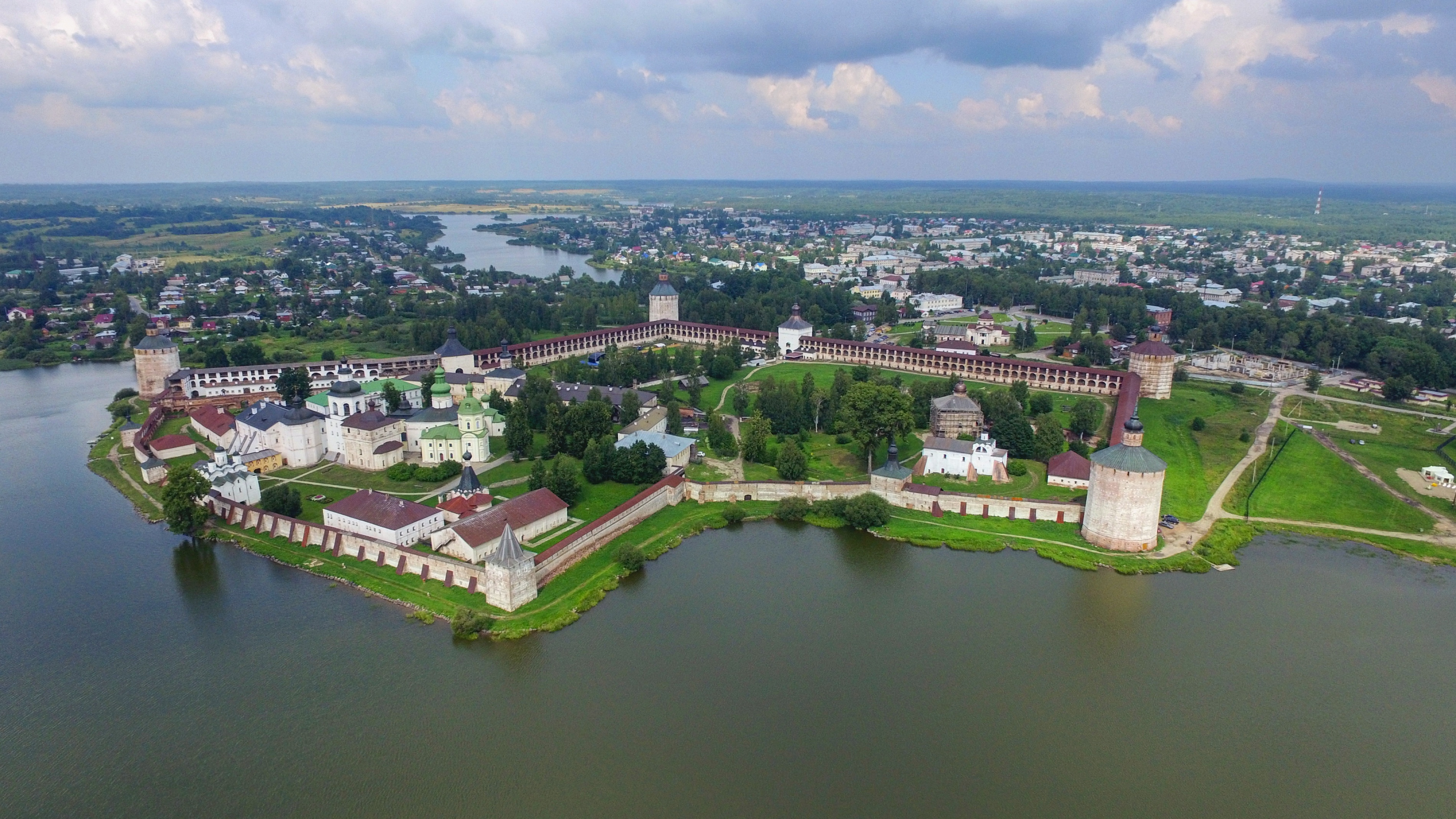
- View of the monastery in 2016
- Interactive map of Kirillo-Belozersky Monastery

Monastery information
- Order: Orthodox
- Established: 1397
- Diocese: Vologda

People
- Founder: Kirill of Beloozero

Site
- Location: Kirillov, Vologda Oblast Russia
- Coordinates: 59°51′26″N 38°22′07″E

Kirillo-Belozersky Monastery (Russian: Кирилло-Белозерский монастырь), known in English as White Lake St. Cyril's Monastery, is a male monastery of the Vologda Eparchy of the Russian Orthodox Church, located on the shore of Lake Siverskoye within the town of Kirillov, Russia which developed from a settlement (sloboda) that grew around the monastery. In the 15th to 17th centuries, it was one of the largest monasteries and most fortified fortresses in the Russian North.

The monastery was consecrated to the feast of the Dormition of the Theotokos, for which cause it was sometimes referred to as the Dormition Monastery of St. Cyril.

== History ==
The monastery was founded in 1397 on the bank of Lake Siverskoye, to the south of the town of Beloozero, in the present-day Vologda Oblast. Its founder, St. Cyril or Kirill of Beloozero, following the advice of his teacher, St. Sergius of Radonezh, first dug a cave here, then built a wooden Dormition chapel and a loghouse for other monks. Shortly before the creation of the monastery, the area fell under the control of the Grand Duchy of Moscow.

Being a member of the influential Velyaminov clan of boyars, Kirill relinquished the office of father superior of the greatest cloister in medieval Moscow, the Simonov monastery. His close ties with the ruling elite can be convincingly demonstrated by his letters to sons of Dmitri Donskoi. It seems that the Muscovite rulers regarded Kirill's monastery as an important strategic point, both for Northern trade and in their struggle with the Novgorod Republic. By 1427, when Kirill died, the prince of Belozersk-Mozhaisk (subject to the Grand Prince of Moscow) was the monastery's patron, and the monastery was administratively subordinate to the Archbishop of Rostov. Under Hegumen Trifon (1434/5–1447/8), social and administrative reforms were undertaken, including the adoption of an Athonite cenobitic rule. A Byzantine-style secondary school was established at which translations of textbooks on grammar, semantics, geography, and history were used. A lasting legacy of the school were bibliographical studies, exemplified by the elder Yefrosin, and text-critical studies, exemplified by Nil Sorsky (1433–1508). Nil also founded a skete on the Sora River near the monastery.

In the 16th century, the monastery was the second richest landowner in Russia, after its model, the Trinity Monastery near Moscow. Ivan the Terrible not only had his own cell in the cloister, but also planned to take monastic vows here. The cloister was also important as a political prison. Among the Muscovite politicians exiled to Kirillov were Vassian Patrikeyev, Tsar Simeon Bekbulatovich, Patriarch Nikon, and the prime minister Boris Morozov. In December 1612, the monastery was besieged by Polish-Lithuanian vagabonds, the Lisowczycy, who failed to capture it.

== Attractions ==
The vast walled area of the monastery comprises two separate priories with eleven churches, most of them dating to the 16th century. Of these, nine belong to the Uspensky (Dormition, the Orthodox equivalent of the Catholic holiday known as the Assumption of Mary) priory by the lake. The Dormition cathedral, erected by Rostov masters in 1497, was the largest monastery church built in Russia up to that date. Its 17th-century iconostasis features many ancient icons, arranged in five tiers above a silver heaven gate endowed by Tsar Alexis in 1645. A lot of valuable objects kept in the sacristy are personal gifts of the tsars who visited the monastery.

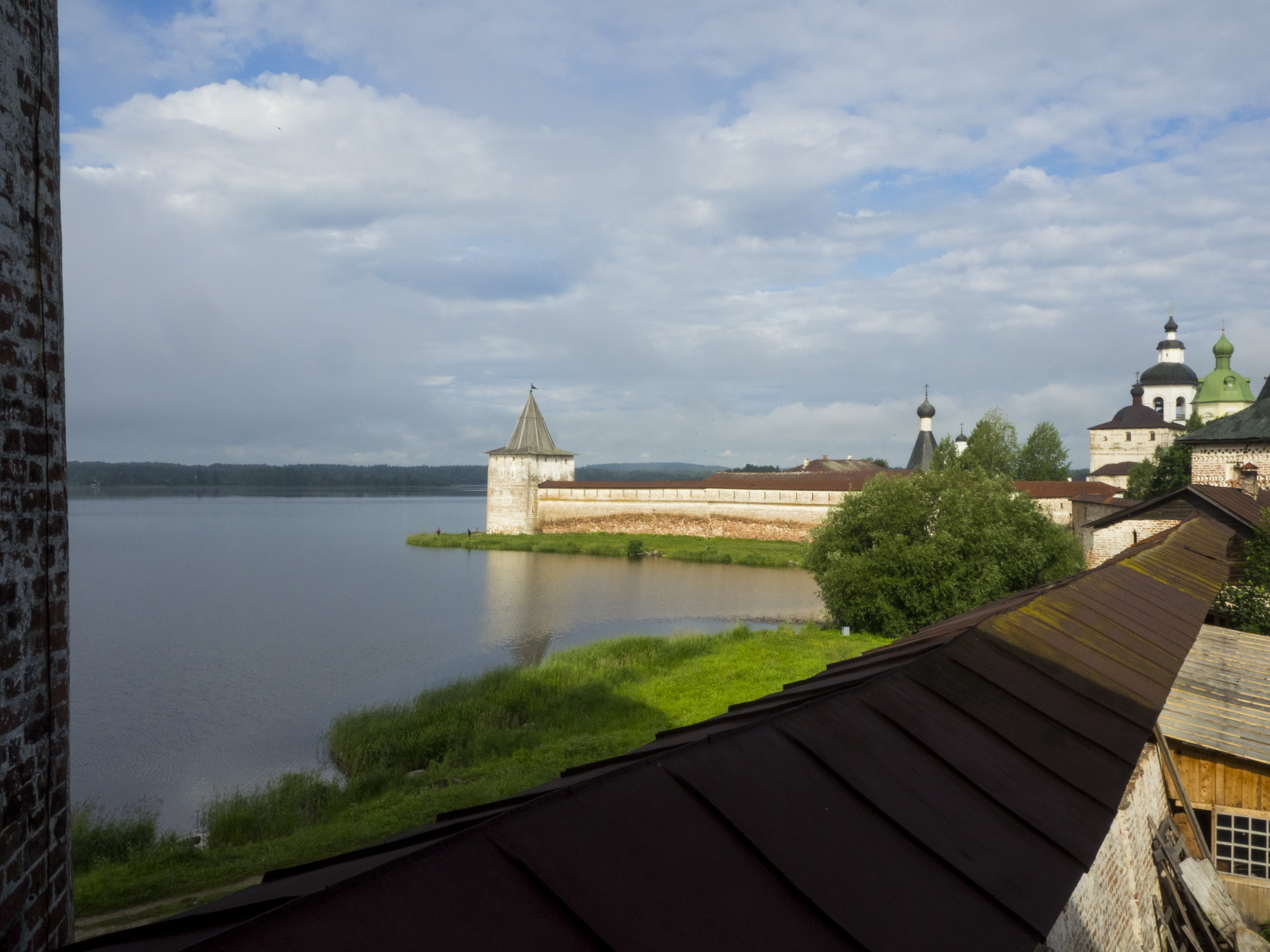
View from one of the monastery towers.

The smaller Ivanovsky priory is dedicated to St. John the Baptist, the patron saint of Ivan the Terrible. The oldest church of the priory was commissioned by Ivan's father, for the benefit of the "mendicant brethren," soon after his visit to the monastery in 1528. Subsequently, the monks incurred the tsar's displeasure by constructing St. Vladimir's Chapel over the grave of the exiled Prince Vorotynsky. Although the tsar chastised them for having broken canonical requirements, the chapel — which became the first family mausoleum in Russia — survived Ivan's reign and was expanded to its present form in 1623.

The monastery walls, 732 meters long and 7 meters thick, were constructed in 1654-80. They incorporate parts of the earlier citadel, which helped to withstand the Polish siege in 1612. The first construction works were supervised by Jean de Gron, a French military engineer known in Russian sources as Anton Granovsky. After the monastic authorities denigrated his Western-style design as alien to Russian traditions, Granovsky was replaced by a team of native masters. The fortress was the largest erected in Muscovy after the Time of Troubles; its walls feature numerous towers, each built to a particular design. The most remarkable are the Chasuble, the Tent-like, the Vologda, and the Smithy towers.

== After secularisation ==
After the Bolsheviks, the monastery was secularised and turned into a museum circa 1924. A wooden shrine from the year 1485 and several traditional timber structures were part of the exhibits. During Soviet-era restoration works, superb 16th-century frescoes were discovered in the gate church of St. Sergius (1560–94).

On the other hand, the monastic library and some other treasures were transferred to Moscow and St Petersburg. These included the oldest extant copies of the 12th-century Daniel's Pilgrimage and the Zadonshchina.

The larger part of the monastery is still administered as the Kirillo-Belozersky Museum of History, Art, and Architecture. The monks were readmitted into the Ivanovsky priory in 1998. As of 2011, the Kirillo-Belozersky Monastery was one of the four functioning monasteries in Vologda Oblast.

The ensemble of the monastery has been designated as a cultural heritage monument of federal significance. As of January 2013, images from the monastery and grounds were available on Google Street View.

== Gallery ==
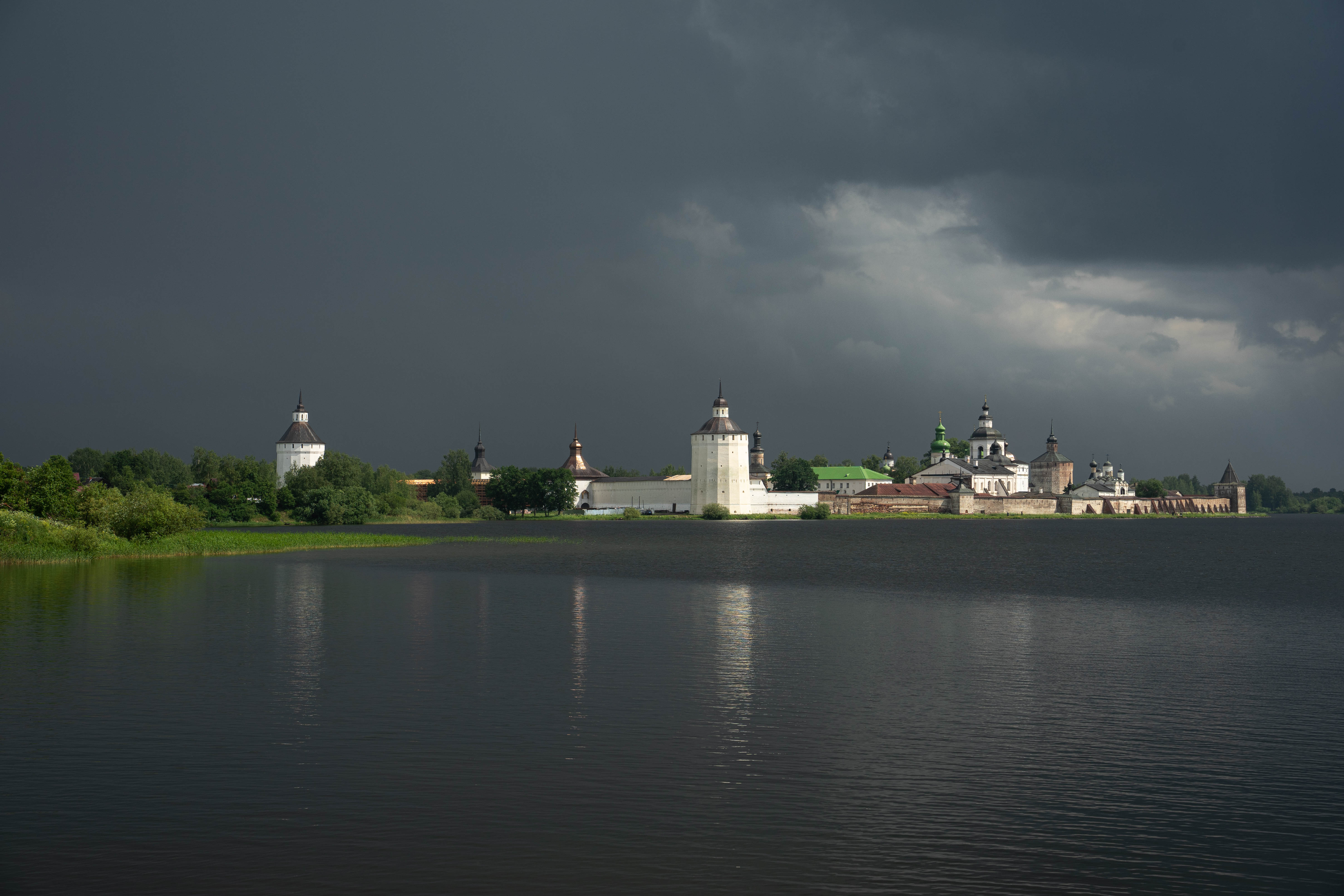
View from the lake (2021)

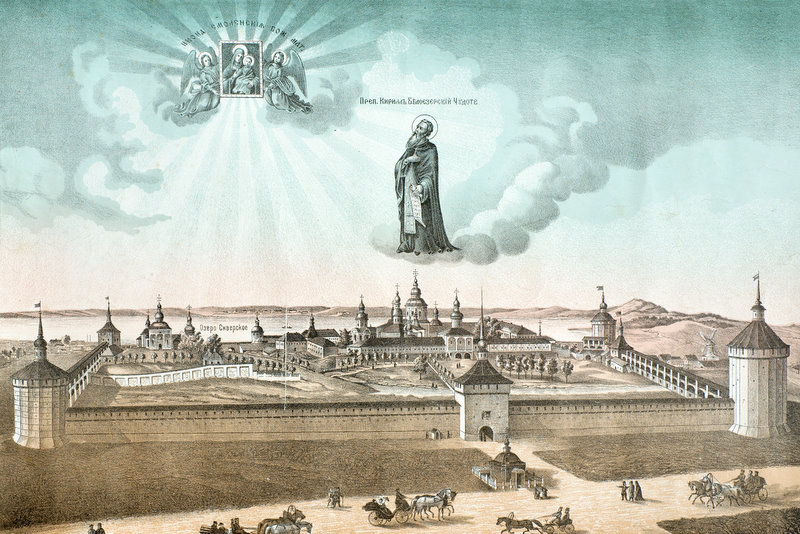
A 1897 view

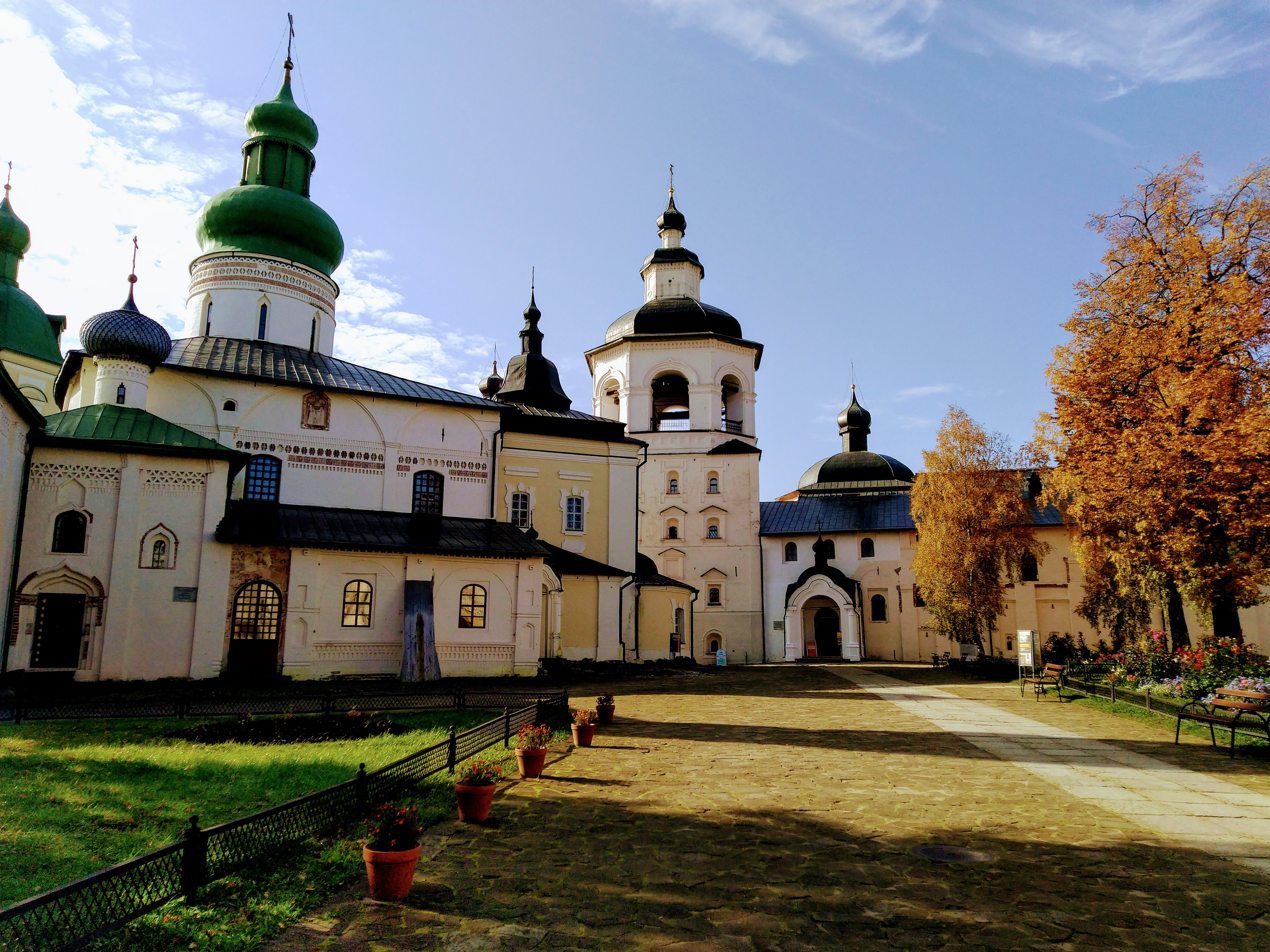
Great Uspensky Monastery

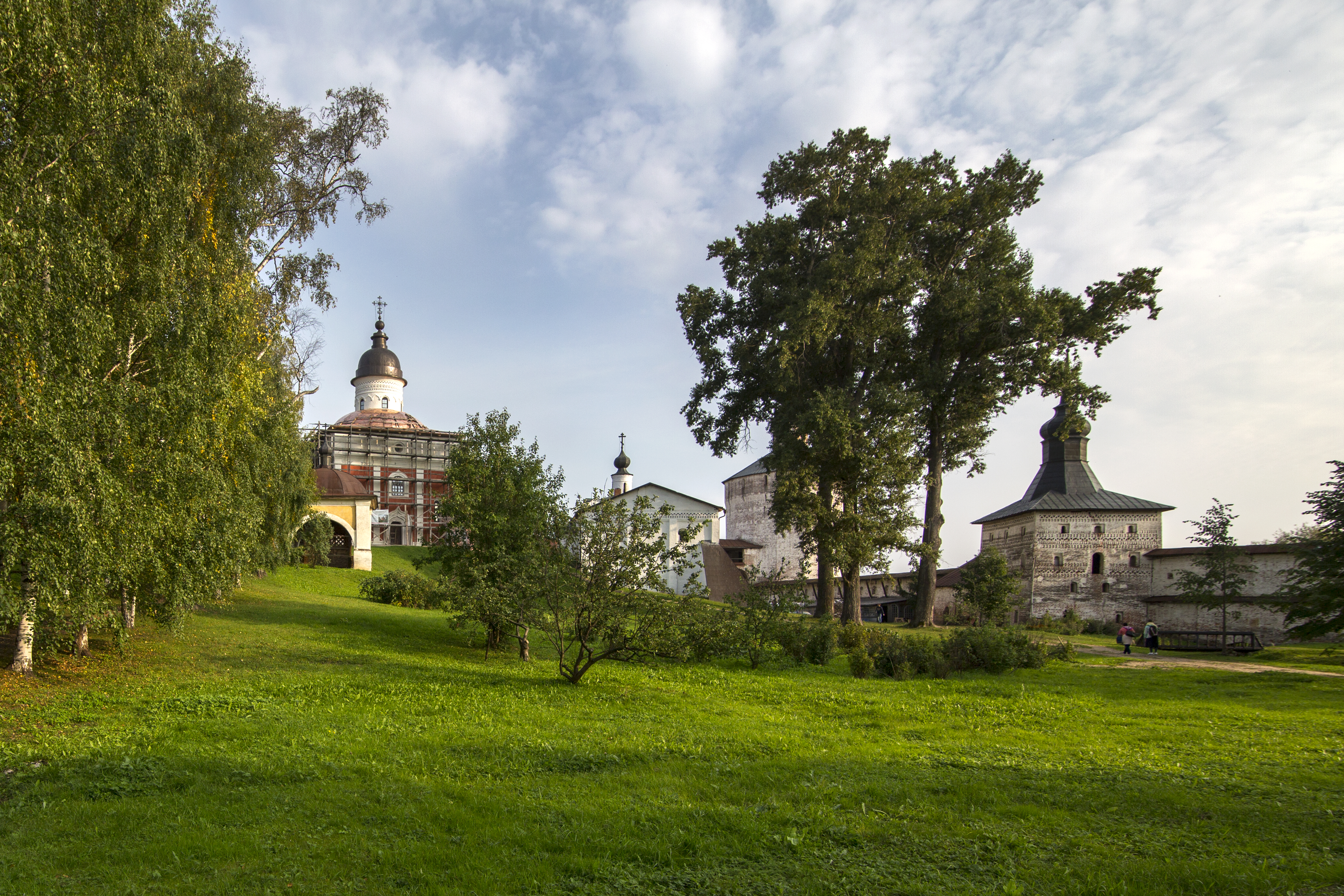
Maly Ivanovsky monastery

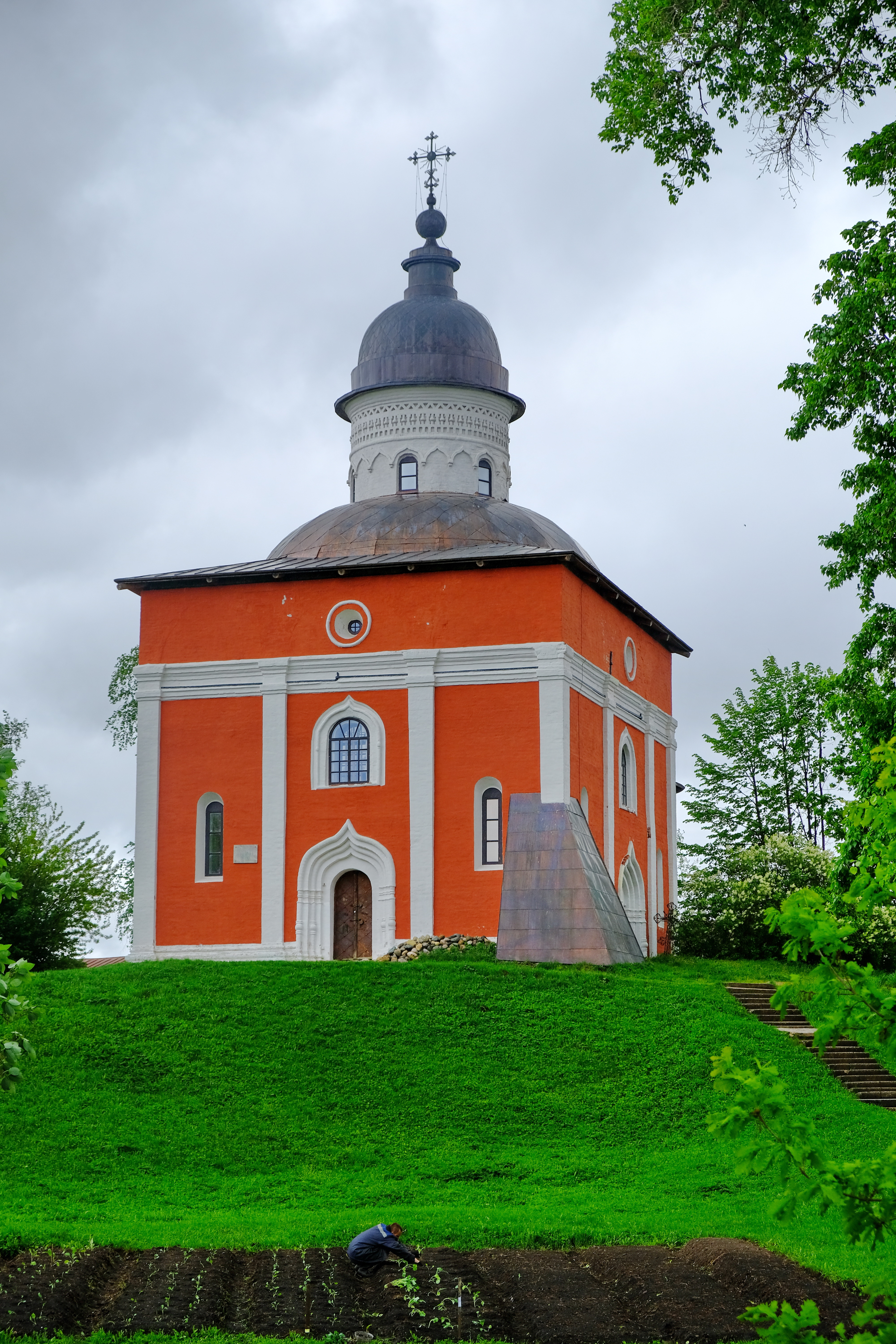
Church of St John the Baptist

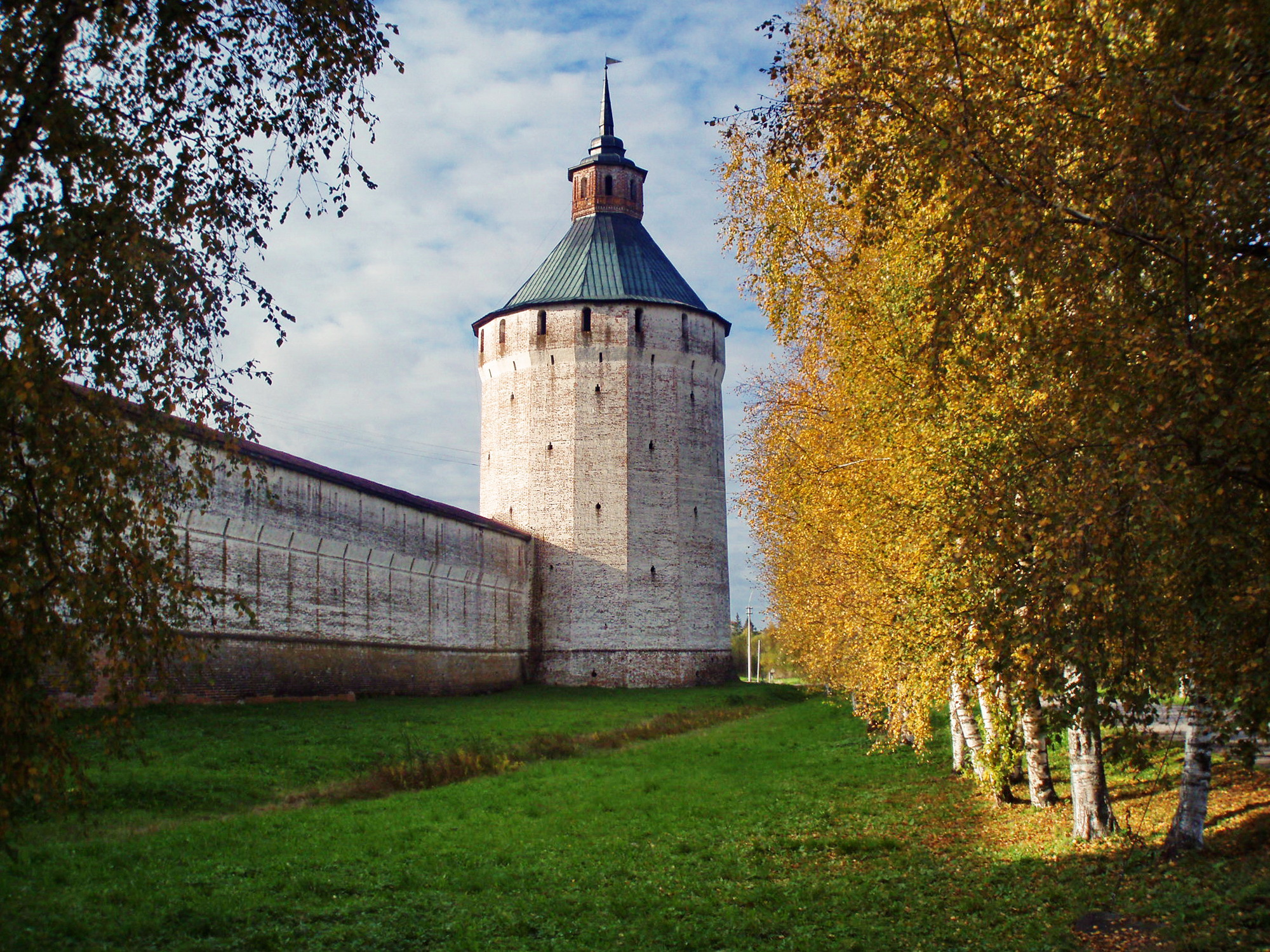
Moskovskaya tower
