= Nilus of Sora =

Russian theologian and saint (1433–1508)

Saint Nilus of Sora
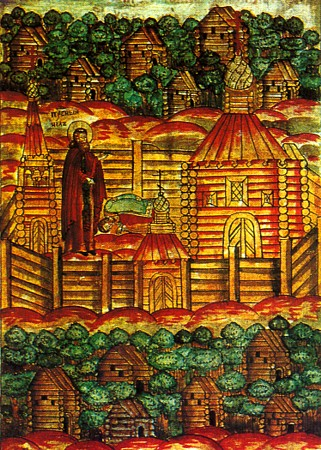
- An old Russian icon of St Nil Sorsky

Venerable
- Born: 1433; Moscow
- Died: 7 May 1508
- Venerated in: Eastern Orthodoxy
- Canonized: 1903 by Russian Orthodox Church
- Major shrine: St. Nilus of Sora Hermitage
- Feast: May 7
- Controversy: nestyazhateli
- Influenced: Vassian Patrikeyev, Maximus the Greek Theology career
- Notable work: The Rule (Ustav); The Tradition (Predanie)
- Theological work
- Tradition or movement: Hesychasm
- Main interests: Ascetcism, Monasticism Mysticism, Theosis
- Notable ideas: nestyazhateli

Nilus of Sora (also Nil Sorsky or Nil Sorski; Russian: Нил Сорский; secular name: Nikolai Maikov; Russian: Николай Майков; c. 1433 – 7 May 1508) was a Russian Orthodox monk, spiritual writer, theologian, and the founder of the Sora Hermitage. He is best known as the founder of a tendency in the Russian Orthodox Church known as the non-possessors (nestyazhateli) which opposed ecclesiastic landownership. The Russian Orthodox Church venerates Nilus as a saint, marking his feast day on the anniversary of his repose on 7 May.

== Early life ==
Nilus of Sora, a great ascetic of the Russian Church, was born in 1433, and descended from the Maikov nobility.

Before becoming a monk, Nilus of Sora worked as a scribe and was engaged in book copying. He also journeyed to Palestine and Greece early in his life and was acquainted there with the Hesychast movement.

Later in his life, he took monastic vows at the Kirillo-Belozersky Monastery, which had been known for its hostile stance towards monastic landownership. The founder of the monastery, Cyril of Beloozero, was himself known for rejecting villages that had been offered to him by devout nobles.

Kirill's followers adopted his ways and would later become known as the startsy from out the Volga with Nilus of Sora as their leader. Soon, he went on a journey to the Holy Land and visited Palestine, Constantinople, and Mount Athos, acquainting himself with a mystical doctrine of Hesychasm and reading patristic literature. Upon his return to Russia sometime between 1473 and 1489, Nilus of Sora founded a cloister on the Sora River not far from the Kirillo-Belozersky Monastery, where he would settle down with his followers. He wrote extensively. This travelling to the holy places made a great impression upon him and changed all his individuality. Solitude, isolation, oblivion of the world became the main features of his character.

== The Novgorod heresy affair ==
Nilus of Sora was involved in the Novgorod heresy affair, which had stirred a lot of minds in Russia at that time. It appears that Nilus of Sora and his closest associate Paisius Yaroslavov were much more tolerant towards the heretics than most of the Russian clergy, led by Archbishop Gennady and Joseph Volotsky.

In 1489, Archbishop Gennady embarked on the path of fighting the heretics and asked Archbishop of Rostov to consult with the elders Nilus of Sora and Paisius (Yaroslavov) (who had been living in his eparchy) and seek their assistance in this matter. Historical accounts of that period do not shed any light on the outcome of these "negotiations", but from that time on there seems to have been no interaction between Nilus of Sora and Paisius (Yaroslavov) on one side and Gennadius and Joseph Volotsky on the other.

The two elders, however, did not treat heresy with indifference. They were both present at the Synod of 1490, which dealt with heresy, and exerted their influence upon its final decision. Initially, the clergy unanimously spoke in support of burning all the heretics at the stake. At the conclusion of the synod, however, only a few priests were condemned and then defrocked without being executed. Later in the decade, however, several heretics were burned in both Novgorod and Moscow.

== Teaching and influence ==
Nilus of Sora was opposed to formality in Orthodoxy faith which were widely spread in the midst of 16th century Russia. It was so deeply crystallized in church life of that period that such persons as Maximus the Greek and the elder Artemiy, who had tried to show the deep basics of Orthodoxy, were considered as Heretics. His wish was to disclose the deep understanding of Orthodoxy devoting more attention to spiritual life of a soul rather than to religious rituals. He was not a bookworm but a speculator-philosopher or speculator-theorist and an uncommon spiritual freedom marked his personality. The whole life of a person - the path of incessant self-perfection and self-improvement - is based on the Holy Gospel. And the Elder showed a lot of psychological understanding of the spiritual struggle and outlined clear ways of "graceful struggle". He deeply believed that moral, inner, spiritual perfection was the ideal foundation of the active, productive life of the believer.

In his teachings, he developed mystical and ascetical ideas along the lines of Gregory Sinaite's hesychasm, asking the believers to concentrate on their inner world and personal emotional experiences of faith as means for achieving unity with God. Nilus of Sora demanded that monks participate in productive labour and spoke in support of monastic reforms on a basis of a secluded and modest lifestyle.

Nilus of Sora dedicated his efforts towards fighting against monastic landownership rights at the Synod of 1503 in Moscow. There, he raised a question about monastic estates, which comprised about one third of the territory of the whole Russian state at that time and which, in his view, had been responsible for demoralization of the Russian monastic communities. Nilus of Sora was supported by the elders of the Kirillo-Belozersky Monastery and his disciple Vassian Patrikeyev. Although he spoke in favour of Ivan III’s policy of secularization of monastic lands, Nilus of Sora did not live long enough to see the end of this struggle. Patrikeyev and Artemius of the Trinity were Nilus' successors.
