= Joseph Volotsky =

Russian Orthodox saint, theologian, and political activist

Saint Joseph of Volotsk
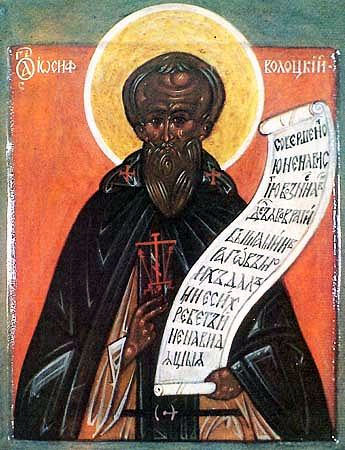
- Russian icon of Saint Joseph Volotsky

Venerable, Abbot
- Venerated in: Eastern Orthodox Church
- Canonized: 1591 by Russian Orthodox Church, (Patriarch Job of Moscow)
- Major shrine: Joseph-Volokolamsk Monastery
- Feast: September 9 October 18
- Attributes: Vested as a monk
- Patronage: Businessmen
- Controversy: Monastic landownership; Tsarism; Theology career
- Notable work: The Enlightener (Просветитель, Prosvetitel)

Joseph Volotsky (Russian: Ио́сиф Во́лоцкий; 1439 or 1440 – September 9, 1515), also known as Joseph of Volotsk or Joseph of Volokolamsk, born Ivan Sanin (Russian: Ива́н Са́нин), was a prominent Russian theologian and early proponent of tsarist autocracy. He led the party defending monastic landownership (the so-called possessors) in the dispute with the non-possessors. The Russian Orthodox Church considers him a saint (along with his most notable opponent, Nilus of Sora); his memory is celebrated on September 9 and October 18 (dates in the Julian Calendar). His patronage is over businessmen.

== Background ==
Joseph Volotsky came from a family of a wealthy landowner (a votchinnik) whose property consisted of the Yazvishche village in the Principality of Volokolamsk, Moscow Oblast. He learned to read and write at the local monastery and then took the tonsure at the Borovsk Monastery in 1459. Upon the death of its abbot, St. Paphnutius of Borovsk, Joseph Volotsky took his place and attempted to introduce a strict monastic charter. The monks, however, rebuffed his idea, and he had to leave the monastery for good. After having lived in a few other monasteries, Joseph became disappointed with their lax morals and founded his own cloister in 1479 near Volokolamsk, which would become known as the Joseph-Volokolamsk Monastery. Joseph's charter prescribed a monk's chief virtue as absolute obedience to his abbot. All aspects of a monk's life at the monastery were regulated and controlled.

Initially, Joseph Volotsky was connected with the appanage princes of Volokolamsk (brothers of Ivan III) and defended the right of local ecclesiastical and secular feudatories to oppose the authority of the grand prince. Later in his life he severed his relations with the opposition and took the side of the grand prince, sealing this alliance by transferring Joseph-Volokolamsk Monastery to the patronage of Vasili III in 1507.

== Struggle against the non-possessors ==
During the Church Sobor of 1503, Joseph Volotsky and his supporters (Josephites) managed to scrap the project of elimination of monastic landownership, proposed by the nestiazhateli, or non-possessors (those who opposed monastic landownership), in the persons of the so-called Transvolgan elders led by Nilus of Sora and Vassian Patrikeyev. Joseph Volotsky addressed a number of epistles to the nestiazhateli, in which he tried to prove the legality of monastic landownership and to justify the rich décor of churches. Eventually, Joseph Volotsky gained the upper hand and the monasteries preserved their landholdings.

== Ideas on the authority of the tsar ==
The triumph of the possessor party went hand in hand with Joseph's efforts to bolster the position of Russia's grand princes, who were now increasingly referred to as tsars, succeeding to the title of universal emperors of Byzantium. Joseph Volotsky restated the formula of an early Byzantine ecclesiastical writer Agapetus that the tsar was a "man in essence, but his power is that of God" and that he was God's deputy on Earth. According to Joseph, however, since the main duty of the tsar is to care for the well-being of the Christian Church, he is legitimate only as long as he adheres to Church rules and moral obligations.

== Struggle against heresies ==
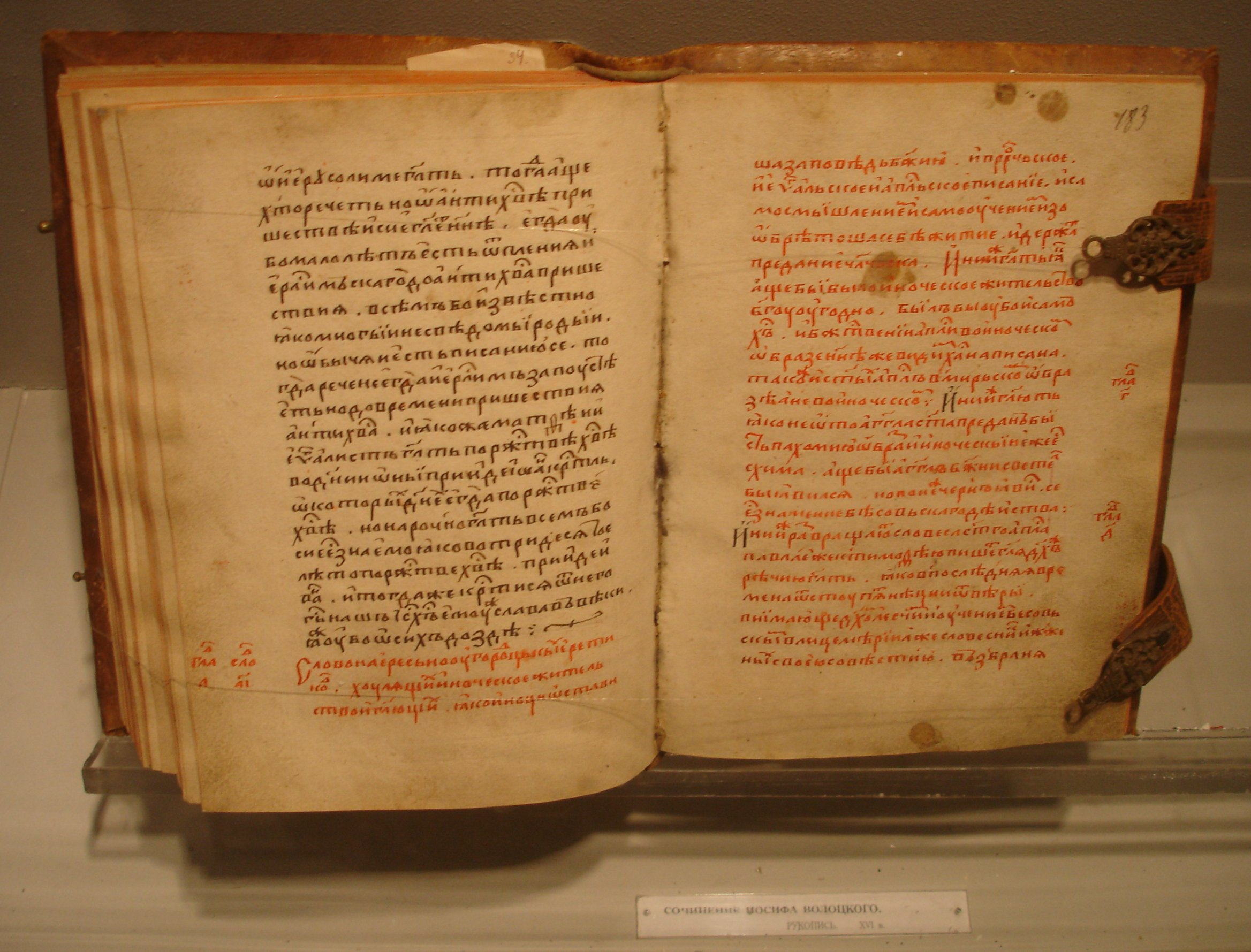
Writing by Joseph Volotsky

Joseph Volotsky is also known to have been a staunch opponent of the heretical sect which was spreading in Russia at that time ("Judaizers"). During the Church Sobor of 1504, he demanded that all heretics be executed by the state.

In his major work, called The Enlightener (Просветитель, Prosvetitel), which consisted of 16 chapters, he tried to prove the wrongfulness of the "new teaching" in order to be able to prosecute the heretics and convince people not to believe in the sincerity of their repentance. Taking inspiration from the Roman-Byzantine treatment of heresiarchs and the Dominican-led persecutions in Spain and Portugal, he called for a civil inquisition against heretics and championed their imprisonment and execution. As with the controversy over monastic ownership of estates, Joseph Volotsky was opposed in this matter by Saint Nilus of Sora.

Joseph's sainthood was officially accepted by the Russian Orthodox Church following his local canonization in 1579 and national canonization in 1591.
