= Vassian Patrikeyev =

Vassian Patrikeyev (Russian: Вассиан Патрикеев; c. 1470 – between 1531 and 1545), also known as Vassian Kosoy (Russian: Вассиан Косой; real name Prince Vasily Ivanovich Patrikeyev), was a bishop of Rostov and confidant of Ivan III of Moscow. Vassian was an ecclesiastic and political figure and writer and an early member of the House of Golitsyn that traced its male-line descent to Duke Patrikas of Korela and to Gediminas, Grand Duke of Lithuania.

== Political action ==
He was known to have been one of the leaders of the boyar party, which supported tsarevich Dmitry Ivanovich (grandson of Ivan III) in a struggle against Sophia Paleologue's son Vasili for succession to the throne.

In ecclesiastic matters, the boyar party was generally closer to heretical and freedom-loving circles.

Vassian wrote the "Epistle on the Ugra" (Poslanie na Ugru), which contains political propaganda about the so-called "Stand on the Ugra". It argued that Batu Khan had plundered and enslaved the land, usurping the title of tsar without being "of a tsarian family", alleging that his descendant Ahmed Khan bin Küchük was a mere "brigand and savage and fighter-of-God", while insisting Ivan III was the only real, legitimate, Orthodox tsar. Vassian wrote that the Tatar campaign (nakhozhdenie) had made the Muscovites afraid, but the Church released Ivan from any oath made to Ahmed Khan, as it was made under duress, and so he no longer owed his Golden Horde overlord any loyalty. The problem with this logic is that Rus' writers had traditionally translated both the Mongol title khan and the Greek Byzantine title basileus ('king, emperor') as tsar (originally from caesar), but Vassian was arguing only Christian Orthodox monarchs such as the Byzantine basileus and the Muscovite knyaz ('prince') should be called tsars. Therefore, Vassian resolved that he needed to elevate the prince of Moscow to the status of tsar, while claiming the Chingisid khans must have been imposters, stealing the tsar title they never deserved, even though Vassian thereby rejected the Pauline doctrine invoked in the Life of Alexander Nevsky and the vita of Michael of Chernigov. It is the first written political attempt to deny the legitimacy of the Golden Horde's supremacy over the Rus' principalities since the Mongol invasion of Kievan Rus' in 1237–1242, and also the first Muscovite attempt to portray the 1480 Stand on the Ugra as having major ideological significance. Literary successors of Vassian's epistle would greatly exaggerate the standoff, wherein 'the events of 1480 assume the status of pivotal moments in the history of man.'

In 1499, Ivan III found out about the conspiracy against Vasili and ordered arrests (the tsar first favored Dmitry Ivanovich). Vassian Patrikeyev was forced to take monastic vows and sent to Kirillo-Belozersky Monastery.

== Ecclesiastic career ==
At the monastery, Patrikeyev became a student of Nil Sorsky and absorbed his philosophy. It appears that in 1503 Patrikeyev and Sorsky came to Moscow to attend a church council (sobor). During this ecclesiastic meeting, the two demanded leniency for the heretics and opposed Joseph Volotsky's views on this issue, subsequently inflaming a dispute between the two parties in the form of personal letters.

During the reign of Vasili III, Patrikeyev reached an important status. Due to his rising influence, many heretics escaped severe punishment. At some point, the tsar even forbade Volotsky to defame Patrikeyev. It appears that Varlaam, who had been close to Nil Sorsky and his followers, was elected Metropolitan bishop with some assistance from Vassian Patrikeyev.

In about 1517, Patrikeyev began his work on revision of the so-called Kormchaya kniga (Book of guidelines; see Canon law), a code of ecclesiastic decrees and laws by the Byzantine emperors. In 1518, Maximus the Greek came from Mount Athos to take part in his work, gathering oppositionary people around him, including Vassian Patrikeyev.

In 1523, a Josephinian hegumen from Volokolamsk named Daniel was elected metropolitan. Soon after this, the church commenced prosecution of the opposition.

A few years later, Patrikeyev's influence began to weaken due to, among other things, his open disapproval of Vasili's divorce. In 1531, Vassian was summoned to appear before the church council as a defendant. Metropolitan Daniel accused Patrikeyev of unauthorized revision of the Kormchaya kniga; insertion of Hellenistic ideas; arbitrary removal of passages which had asserted the right of the monasteries to own patrimonies; revilement of miracle workers, e.g. Saint Makarius Kalyazinsky and Metropolitan Jonah; "heretic lines" in his translation of Simeon Metaphrastes' Life of St. Mary. The church council found Patrikeyev guilty and sent him to a hostile Joseph-Volokolamsk Monastery, where he would die a decade later.

Patrikeyev's date of death is uncertain. He died no later than 1545 and a violent death, if one is to believe Ivan the Terrible's closest associate Andrei Kurbsky.

== Bibliography ==
- Halperin, Charles J. (1987). Russia and the Golden Horde: The Mongol Impact on Medieval Russian History. p. 222. ISBN 9781850430575. (e-book).
