= Stoglav Synod =

1551 Orthodox church council in Moscow

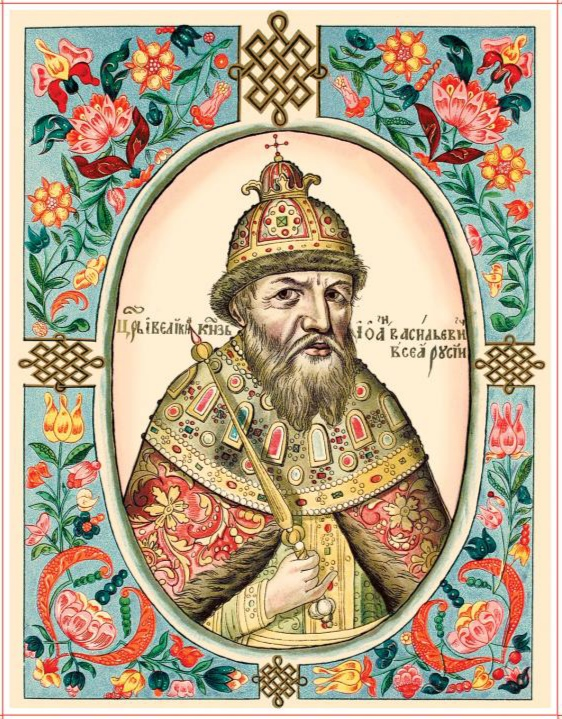
A portrait of Ivan IV, who requested the synod, in the Tsarsky titulyarnik

The Stoglav Synod (Russian: Стоглавый Собор), also translated as the Hundred Chapter Synod or Council of a Hundred Chapters, was a church council (sobor) held in Moscow in 1551, with the participation of Tsar Ivan IV, Metropolitan Macarius (presiding), other higher clergymen, and possibly representatives of the Boyar Duma. It convened in January and February 1551, with some final sessions as late as May of that year. Its decrees are known as the Stoglav.

== Purpose and decisions ==
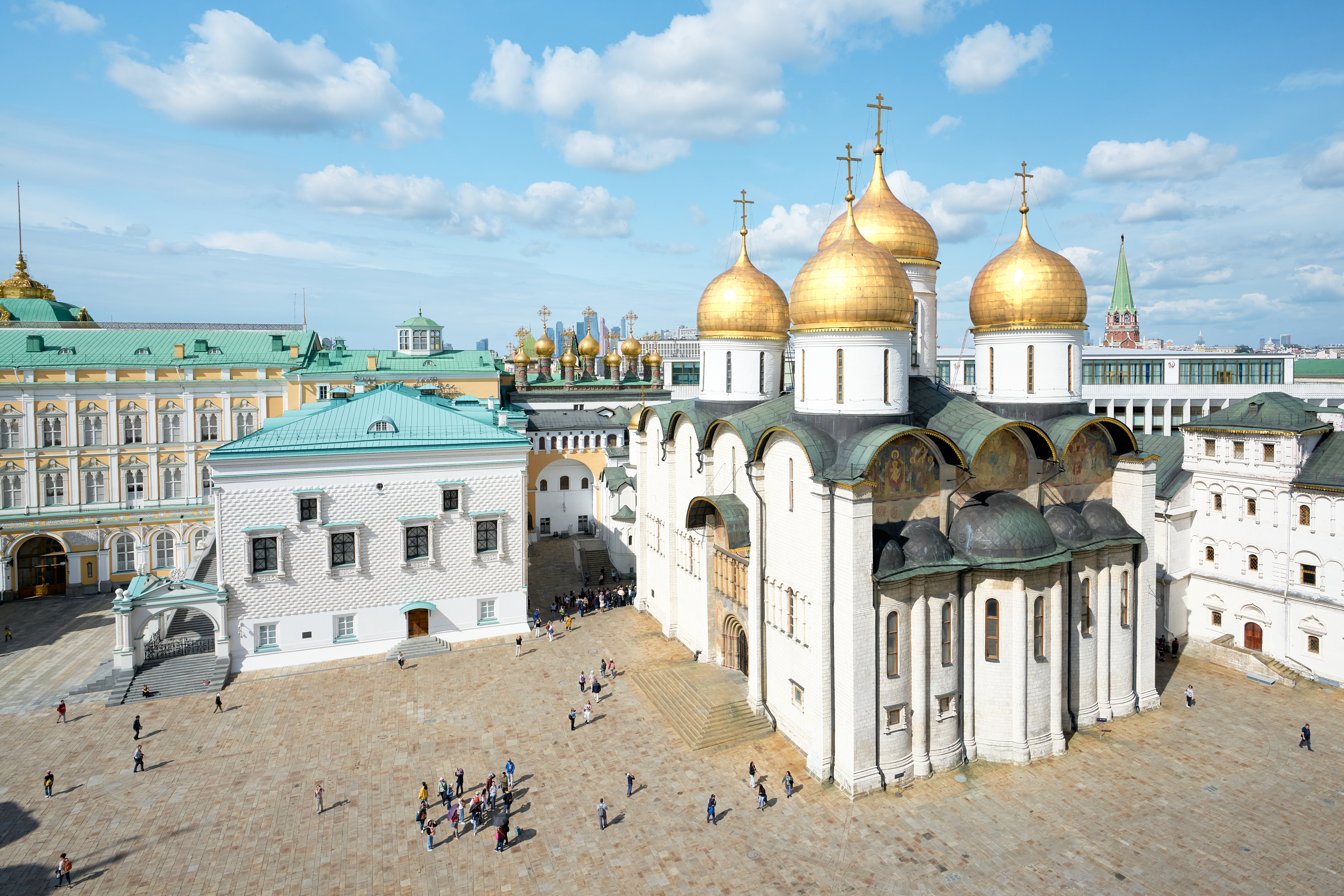
Services during the council were held in the Dormition Cathedral on the right, while working sessions were held in the Palace of Facets on the left.

In 1542, Macarius was elected Metropolitan of Moscow and all Russia, and he later supported Ivan IV's coronation and marriage to Anastasia Romanovna. When Ivan left Moscow to campaign in Kazan, Macarius served as head of state. In 1551, the Tsar summoned a synod of the Russian Church, led by Macarius, to resolve discrepancies and issues in the church, as well as address certain spiritual and existential issues of Russian society. Ivan gave four speeches to the council, asking questions on church opinion concerning various rites and practices of the church, and the clergymen deliberated and presented a consensus to Ivan which would be later codified.

There is some debate over the timeline of the council in 1551. The Stoglav document itself, the written church code produced by the council, states that the council began February 23rd and concluded May 11th. However, no original copy of the code exists, and over a hundred different handwritten copies are known. Most scholars, including Yevgeny Golubinsky, recognize the date in the Stoglav, February 23rd, as the beginning of the council. Others, such as Dmitry Stefanovich, suggest that the council begin in early January and ended in February, with the dates in the written code describing the period during which the clergymen compiled the code from their earlier deliberations.

The Stoglav Synod proclaimed the inviolability of church properties and the exclusive jurisdiction of church courts over ecclesiastical matters. At the demand of the church hierarchy the government cancelled the tsar's jurisdiction over ecclesiastics. In exchange, members of the Stoglav Synod made concessions to the government in a number of other areas, such as a prohibition for monasteries to found new large villages in cities. By decisions of the Stoglav Synod, church ceremonies and duties in the whole territory of Russia were unified, and norms of church life were regulated with the purpose of increasing the educational and moral level of the clergy to ensure they would correctly fulfill their duties, such as creation of schools for preparation of priests. In particular, the Sobor forbade the tradition of polyphony and other shortcuts in liturgy. The church authorities' control over the activities of book writers, icon painters, and others, was firmly established. In particular, this was the council which declared Andrei Rublev's icon painting style to be ideal.

The decrees issued by the Synod, the Stoglav, ruled that all traditional Russian rituals were correct, compared to the alternative Greek rites. This unilaterial decision shocked many of the Orthodox. The monks of Athos protested and the Russian monks there regarded the decisions of the synods as invalid. The decisions of the Stoglav Synod that approved the native Russian rituals at the expense of those accepted in Greece and other Orthodox countries were cancelled by the Moscow Sobor of 1666–1667, which furthered the great schism of the Russian church known as the Raskol.

== Church code ==
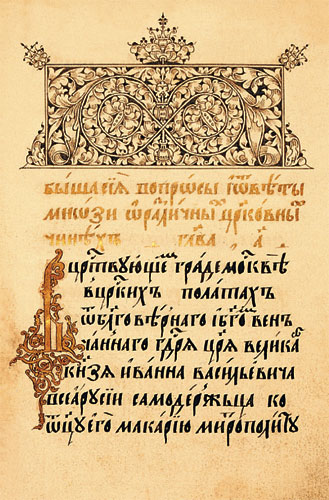
The title page of the Stoglav code developed at the synod

The synod produced a church code named The Synodal Code of the Russian Orthodox Church Synod. It was phrased as a record of questions of the Tsar to the clergy with their answers. By the end of the 16th century the text of the Code was divided into one hundred chapters (or "sto glav" in Russian), and had become commonly referred to as the Stoglav. Accordingly, since these times the Sobor acquired the name "Stoglav Synod". The Stoglav was the basic code of canon law as well as a guide to the everyday life of the Muscovite clergy. There are many hand-written editions of the "Stoglav".

== Bibliography ==
- Kollman, Jack E. (1978). The Moscow Stoglav ('Hundred Chapters') Church Council of 1551 (PhD thesis). University of Michigan. ISBN 9798660868931.
- Kollman, Jack E. (1980). "The Stoglav Council and Parish Priests". Russian History. 7 (1/2). Brill: 65–91. ISSN 0094-288X.
- Panov, Pyotr (2014). "Значение Стоглавого собора в истории Русской Православной Церкви" [The Significance of the Stoglav Council in the History of the Russian Church]. Вестник Оренбургской духовной семинарии (in Russian) (1). Православная религиозная организация: 70–77.
- Pascal, Pierre (1963). "Avvakum et les débuts de Raskol". Études sur l'histoire, l'économie et la sociologie des pays slaves. 8. Mouton.
- Pentiuc, E.J. (2014). The Old Testament in Eastern Orthodox Tradition. Oxford University Press. ISBN 9780199716029. LCCN 2013028095.
- Runciman, Steven (1985). The Great Church in Captivity. Cambridge University Press.
