= Lithuanian–Muscovite War (1534–1537) =

Fifth war of the Muscovite-Lithuanian Wars

Lithuanian-Muscovite War (1534–1537)
- Part of Muscovite-Lithuanian Wars
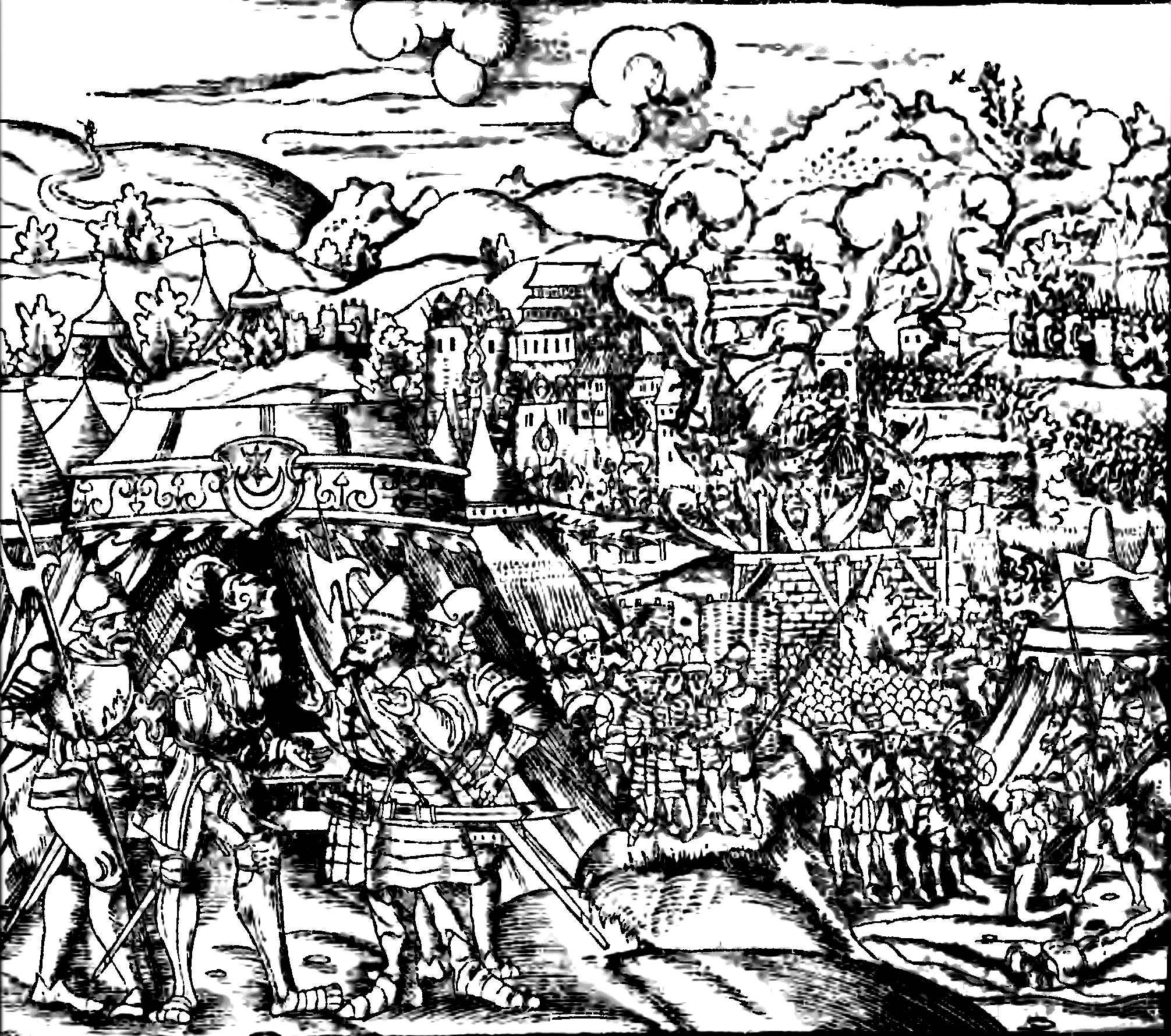
- Siege of Starodub
Date	1534–1537
Location	Modern-day Russia, Belarus, Lithuania
Result	Inconclusive
Territorial changes	Grand Duchy of Lithuania gains Gomel; Principality of Moscow gains Sebezh and Zawołocze

Belligerents
Grand Duchy of Lithuania; Crown of the Kingdom of Poland	Principality of Moscow

Commanders and leaders
Sigismund I the Old	Elena Glinskaya

Strength
70,000+ troops	150,000+ troops

Lithuanian-Muscovite War (1534–1537), also known as the Fifth Lithuanian-Muscovite War and the War of Starodub, was a war that lasted from August 1534 to 18 February 1537 between the Kingdom of Poland supported by the Grand Duchy of Lithuania against the Principality of Moscow. It ended with a peace agreement signed in Moscow on 18 February 1537.

== Prelude ==
In March 1532, Maciej Janowicz and Wasyl Czyż arrived in Moscow. They demanded the return of Smolensk (which became Russian after the Fourth Lithuanian–Muscovite War) under the condition that they would sign perpetual peace with the Principality of Moscow.

On the 25th of December 1532 the deadline for the six-year armistice between the Principality of Moscow and Kingdom of Poland and Grand Duchy of Lithuania expired. It was extended to 25 December 1533. Grand Prince of Moscow Vasili III of Russia began preparations for a new operation aiming to capture Kiev. However, he soon died and the rule of Moscow was taken over by his wife Elena Glinskaya, who held the regency on behalf of Ivan the Terrible due to him being a minor.

King Sigismund I the Old decided to go to war with the Principality of Moscow with the aim of recapturing Smolensk (which became Russian after the Fourth Lithuanian–Muscovite War) and Severia (which became Russian after the Second Muscovite-Lithuanian War). In February 1534, he got consent from the Sejm of the Grand Duchy of Lithuania to carry out military operations against the Principality of Moscow. The Sejm of the Polish–Lithuanian Commonwealth in Piotrków Trybunalski also passed new resolutions for the recruitment of people into the army. Pospolite ruszenie of the Lithuanian nobility was called for in Minsk on the 23rd of May 1534.

== 1534 Campaign ==
Moscow's troops carried out an operation in the area of Smolensk. However, they stopped their march as they were threatened by Crimean Tatars working with the Poles. At the beginning of August, two voivodes Ivan Lacki and Semyon Ivanovich crossed over to the Lithuanian side with their troops. The Grand Hetman of Lithuania, Jerzy Radziwiłł, became the commander-in-chief of the strong Lithuanian army consisting of around 40,000 troops.

These units were divided into three corps (including one defensive corp) operating in two directions of the operations. On August 19, the corps of the Kiev voivode Andrzej Niemirowicz and Wasyl Czyż attacked the Severia region. At the same time, the corps of Iwan Wiśniowiecki and Andrzej Kowerski set off towards Smolensk. The reserves under the command of Jerzy Radziwiłł remained in Mogilev.

Niemirowicz's corps besieged Starodub, Gomel and Novhorod-Siverskyi. In September, he launched an attack into the Principality of Moscow, defeating the Muscovite army in the Battle of Rachodoszcz. He gained Rachodoszcze while his units reached Chernihiv and Pochep, although they did not capture these cities. Near Smolensk Andrzej Niemirowicz's corps united with Iwan Wiśniowiecki's corps. On September 13, Poles and Lithuanians captured Smolensk, but soon after they were forced to retreat to Mogilev.

On October 1, Sigismund I was forced to dissolve the pospolite ruszenie, only retaining a corp with 3,000 soldiers to occupy the border fortresses. The Russians quickly took advantage of this by attacking Belarus and reaching Vitebsk. Moscows troops even reached the outskirts of Vilnius.

In November, the Russians had an army consisting of 150,000 soldiers.

== 1535 Campaign ==
On February 3, 1535, Muscovite troops formed into three armies attacked Belarus from two directions, one of them being from Smolensk and the other from Opochka. The small Lithuanian crews stayed in fortresses. The Russians tried to starve them, destroying villages and supplies within a 100 km radius. On February 14, Russian troops entered Lithuania, reaching Maladzyechna. However, not encountering any Lithuanian troops and at risk of being cut off, they withdrew towards Opochka.

Poles then came to the aid of the Lithuanians. The Sejm of the Polish–Lithuanian Commonwealth in Piotrków Trybunalski passed extraordinary resolutions for the recruitment of troops. 10,000 Polish troops, led by Grand Hetman of the Crown Jan Tarnowski were ready to attack. The mercenary troops were commanded by the Castellan of Kalisz, Andrzej Górka. To forestall the operations of Polish troops, Moscow's troops made an unsuccessful attempt to capture the Lithuanian border fortresses: Mstsislaw, Krychaw, Mogilev, Shklow, Orsha and Dubrowna.

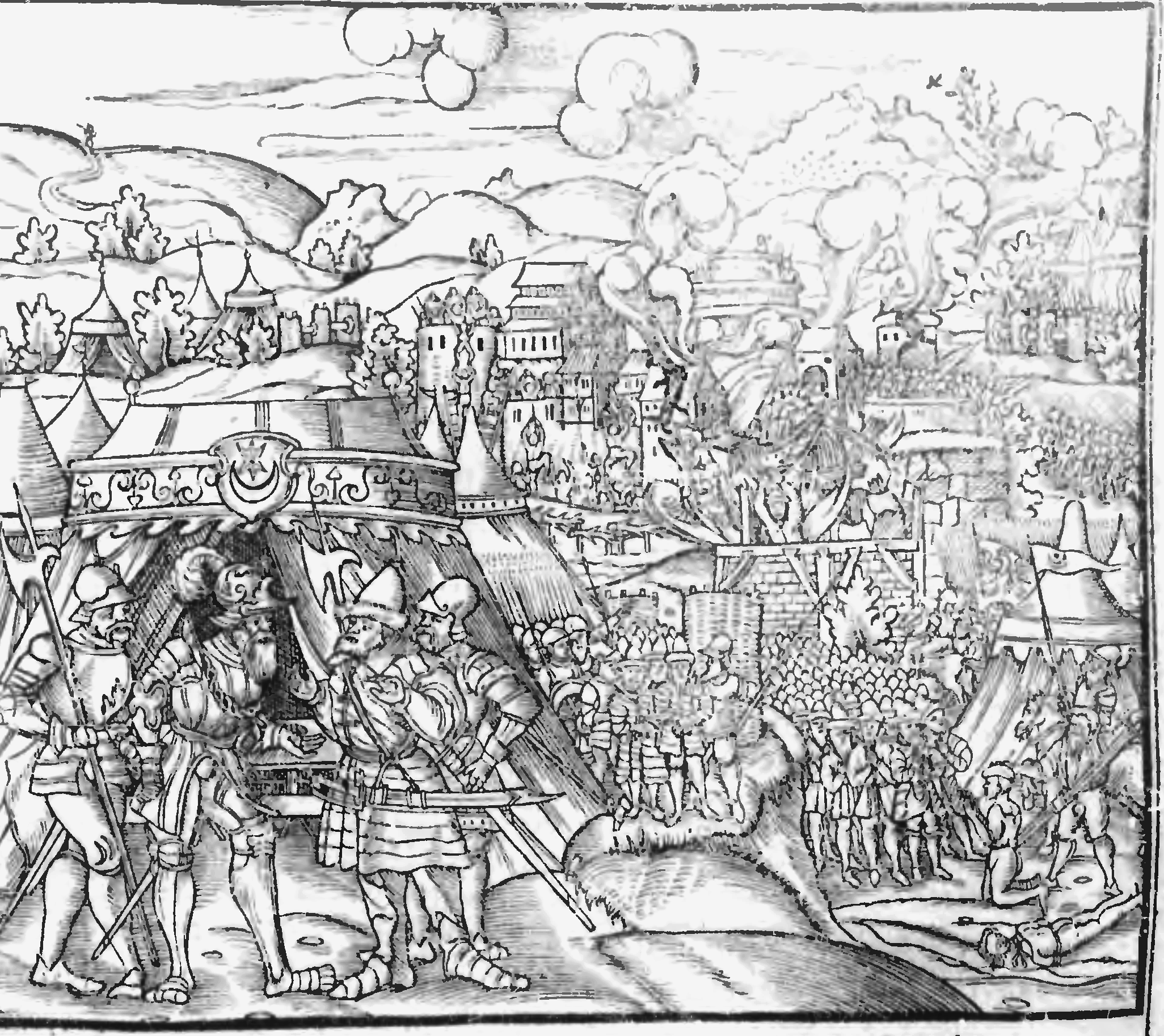
Hetman Jan Tarnowski during the Siege of Starodub in 1535, woodcut from Marcin Bielski's Chronicle of Everything

Unable to gain a foothold in enemy territory, the Russians built their own fortress in Sebezh in 3 weeks. However, Sigismund I decided to attack the Russians in the south. On July 16, after a three-day siege, Polish troops captured the fortress in Gomel. On July 30, they began the siege of Starodub, one of the strongest fortresses of the Principality of Moscow. The fortress could not withstand the explosion of the Polish mines planted. After the successful assault, Jan Tarnowski ordered the beheading of 1,400 Moscow defenders who did not hear the call to surrender. The wizards approached the castle, dug in, covered it with evil herb, set it on fire and a strong thunder tore out the wall. – the Rus' chronicle reported this event.

== 1536 Campaign ==
In January 1536, the Russians built Zawołocze, their second fortress on the territory of the Grand Duchy of Lithuania. On February 27, a corp with 20,000 of voivodes led by Andrzej Niemirowicz of Kiev and Jan Hlebowicz of Polotsk tried to capture Sebezh. In June, Moscow troops built the Velizh fortress. Russian voivodes carried out offensive operations, reaching Vitebsk and Liubech, although they failed to capture these cities. There was a stalemate on the front, neither side was able to make a decisive attack. Due to the lack of money in the state treasury, Sigismund I started peace negotiations.

== Peace ==
On January 12, 1537, a Lithuanian legation arrived in Moscow. On February 18, a five-year peace was signed. Under it, the Grand Duchy of Lithuania retained the captured Gomel, while Moscow retained Sebezh and Zawołocze. This peace was extended in 1542 for 7 years till 1549.

== See also ==
- Muscovite–Lithuanian Wars
