= Solomonia Saburova =

Grand princess of Moscow from 1505 to 1525

Saint Solomonia Saburova
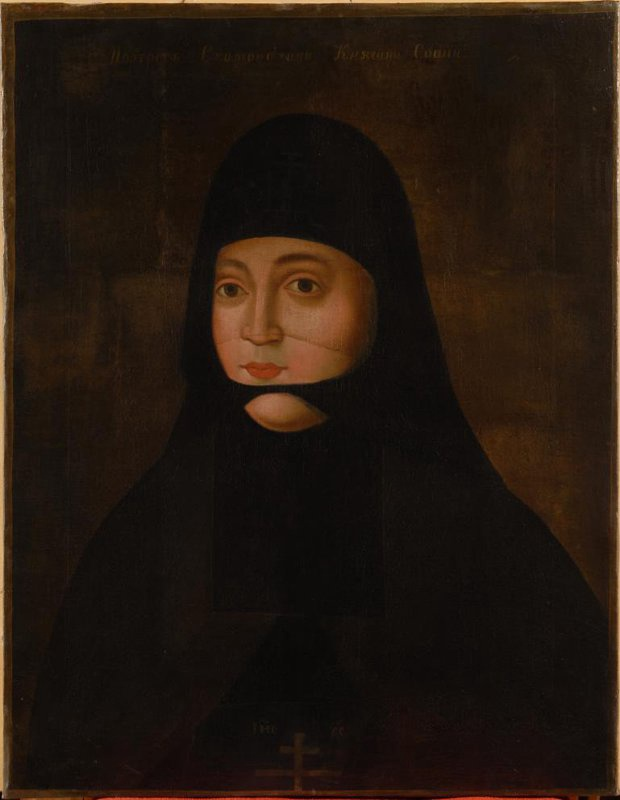
- Sister Sofia in Intercession Monastery, 19th century

Grand Princess consort of Moscow
- Tenure: 27 October 1505 – November 1525
- Predecessor: Sophia Palaiologina
- Successor: Elena Glinskaya
- Born: c. 1490
- Died: 18 December 1542; Suzdal
- Spouse: Vasili III of Russia
- Issue: Kudeyar (folk legend)
- House: Daniilovichi
- Father: Yury Konstantinovich Saburov

Solomonia Yuryevna Saburova (Russian: Соломония Юрьевна Сабурова; c. 1490 – 18 December 1542) was the grand princess of Moscow as the wife of Vasili III of Russia. She was canonized by the Russian Orthodox Church as Saint Sofia of Suzdal.

== Life ==
Her father was Yury Konstantinovich Saburov, a Russian nobleman who was elevated to the rank of boyar upon his daughter's marriage to the monarch. One of her relatives later became the wife of Ivan IV's son and heir, Ivan Ivanovich, and another lady of the Saburov-Godunov clan was Irina Feodorovna, the wife of the last Rurikid tsar, Feodor I. One other relative Boris Godunov reigned as Tsar Boris I of Russia.

=== Grand Princess ===
The wedding of Solomonia and Vasily III took place on 4 September 1505, in presence of the groom's father, Ivan III. Metropolitan Simon blessed the newlyweds at the Cathedral of the Dormition in the Moscow Kremlin. After twenty years, it became apparent that Solomonia was barren. Vasili perfectly understood that if he died childless his brothers would inherit the throne. In order to preclude this scenario, they were incarcerated or forbidden to marry until his own son was born. In the long term, this led to the extinction of the Rurikid dynasty and to the succession crisis known as the Time of Troubles.

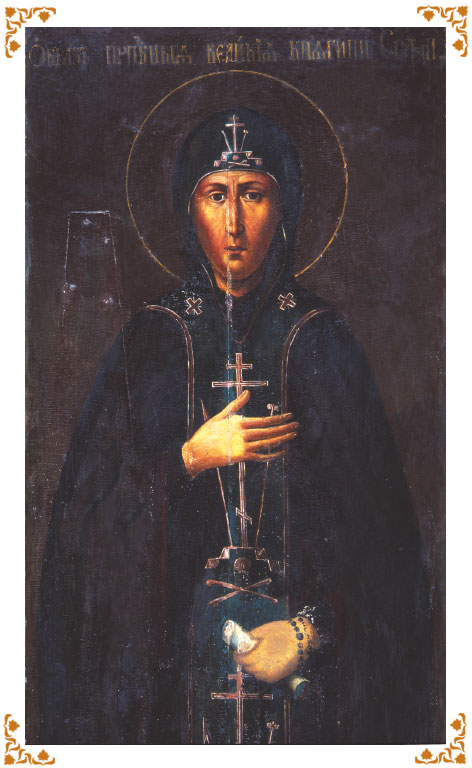
Icon of Saint Sofia of Suzdal

Despite her shining beauty, exemplary morals and mild character, Solomonia's failure to beget an heir must have weighed upon Vasili's relations with his wife, who turned to foreign doctors for help. In 1525, the grand prince decided to divorce Solomonia with the approval of Metropolitan Daniel and the boyars, although Vassian Patrikeyev, Maksim Grek, and some other ecclesiastical authorities declared the divorce unlawful.

=== Later life ===
In November 1525, the marriage was annulled and Solomonia was forced to take the veil under the name of Sophia at the Nativity Monastery of Moscow. She was then moved to the Intercession Convent in Suzdal, one of the many votive churches commissioned by Vasily and his wife in supplication for the birth of an heir.

Sigismund von Herberstein asserts in his Notes on Muscovite Affairs that she was forcefully taken to the convent, whereas the Russian chronicles tend to emphasise Solomonia's submission to the sovereign's will. There were rumors that Solomonia had given birth to a child named George within the walls of the monastery. She died in Suzdal in 1542.

== In Culture ==
Solomonia Saburova's relationship with husband Vasili III of Moscow was fictionalised in the opera Neprigozhaya by Ella Adayevskaya.

Solomonia Saburova Clan Saburov-Godunov Born: c. 1490 Died: 18 December 1542
Russian royalty
Vacant Title last held by Sophia Palaiologina	Grand Princess of Moscow; 1505–1525	Vacant Title next held by Elena Glinskaya
