= Race, Rights, and Rifles =

2023 book by Alexandra Filindra

- Author: Alexandra Filindra
- Original title: Race, Rights, and Rifles: The Origins of the NRA and Contemporary Gun Culture
- Language: English
- Series: Chicago Studies in American Politics
- Subject: Military history; intellectual history; race; political science
- Publisher: University of Chicago Press
- Publication date: September 2023
- Publication place: United States
- Pages: 368
- ISBN: 9780226828763

Race, Rights, and Rifles: The Origins of the NRA and Contemporary Gun Culture is a book by the American political scientist Alexandra Filindra. Published in 2023 by the University of Chicago Press, and part of its Chicago Studies in American Politics series, the book explores the historical trajectory of American gun culture, tracing it back to the nation's founding era. Filindra argues that the dominant gun culture in the United States is rooted in ascriptive martial republicanism, a tradition that intertwines classical republican citizen-soldier ideals with American White male supremacy.

== Summary ==
The book delves into the historical evolution of American gun culture, arguing that the dominant ideology behind it is rooted in "ascriptive martial republicanism". This ideology, linking classical republican citizen-soldier ideals with White male supremacy, shapes a worldview where civic duty is intertwined with bearing arms for the protection of the nation.

The book is divided into three parts:

1. Historical Foundations, exploring early ascriptive republican ideology, its embeddedness in America's military institutions, and the social and cultural transmission of this ideology;
2. The Origins and Worldview of the National Rifle Association (NRA), tracing the emergence of the NRA and its ascriptive republican stance;
3. and Ascriptive Republicanism in Contemporary White Public Opinion, examining the ideology's influence on current gun attitudes and its correlation with anti-democratic beliefs.

Filindra studies history, organizational history, and contemporary mass political behavior, giving a detailed account of the NRA's role in preserving this ideological tradition.

== Author ==
In a September 2023 interview with Current, Filindra discussed her motivation for writing the book. She said she was interested in the intersection of contemporary gun culture, race, and political attitudes and noted the discrepancy between the prevailing notion associating gun culture with liberal individualism and her findings that connect it to political duty, negative racial attitudes, and the dominance of White men. Filindra argued that the book offers a new perspective on America's gun culture by integrating military history, intellectual history, race, and political science.

In January 2024, the New Books Network published an audio podcast interview with Filindra about the book. Filindra said that she started working on gun issues in 2013 after the Connecticut school shooting. She had speculated that race may have had a big impact on gun culture in America, and that looking at the literature she found "very little research on guns and racial attitudes". Filindra said that the existing historical legal literature wasn't convincing and didn't give her a "satisfying answer" and that's why she started exploring classic American historians.

== Reviews ==
Political scientist Matthew J. Lacombe wrote a review in which he praised the book for its ambitious exploration of the historical roots of American gun culture and its contemporary political implications. Lacombe highlighted and affirmed Filindra's argument that the dominant gun culture in America is linked to ascriptive martial republicanism, intertwining duty, traditional masculinity, and White identity in a local culture focused on armed citizenship. Lacombe noted the debunking of the myth that the NRA was apolitical or supportive of gun control, but he highlighted what he thought as some occasional harsh treatment of the NRA, urging a balanced perspective. Lacombe appreciated the content analyses showing the presence of ascriptive martial republicanism in NRA materials and the exploration of the NRA's "theory of democracy." He also raised questions about the NRA's strategic motivations and its translation of this ideology into political power.

Lacombe wrote:

I applaud Filindra for giving little credence to the commonly asserted myth that the NRA was, for much of its history, apolitical or even genuinely supportive of gun control. While that myth makes for an interesting story, it is just wrong, as Filindra and others have shown. The road to altering what’s considered to be “conventional wisdom” tends to be bumpy and slow, so it is good to see another well-researched account that can help chip away at this misconception.

Kirkus Reviews described the book as an "enlightening, timely study of the evolution of arguments about gun ownership."

== Robert E. Lane Award's honorable mention ==
The book was acknowledged with an honorable mention in the 2024 Robert E. Lane Award from the American Political Association.
