= Vasili III of Russia =

Grand Prince of Moscow from 1505 to 1533

Vasili III
- Sovereign of all Russia
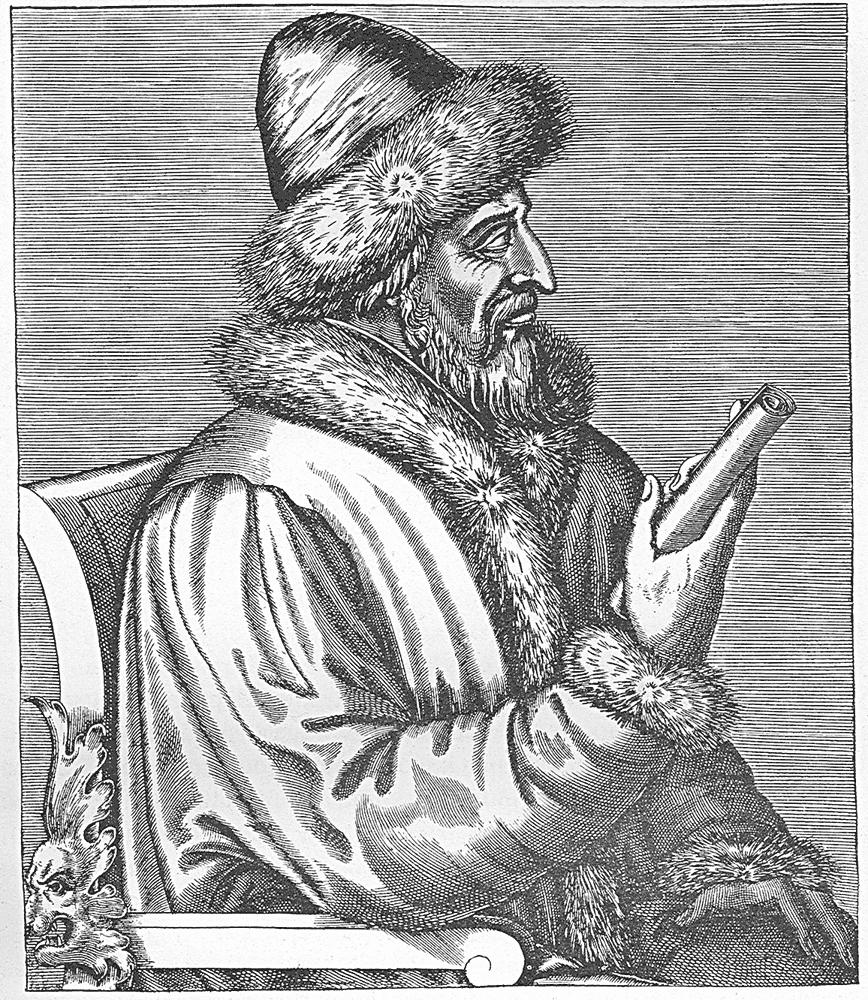
- Engraving by André Thevet, 1584

Grand Prince of Moscow and all Russia
- Reign: 6 November 1505 – 3 December 1533
- Coronation: 14 April 1502
- Predecessor: Ivan III
- Successor: Ivan IV
- Born: 25 March 1479; Moscow, Russia
- Died: 3 December 1533 (aged 54); Moscow, Russia
- Burial: Archangel Cathedral
- Spouses: Solomonia Saburova (m. 1505; div. 1525) Elena Glinskaya (m. 1526)
- Issue: Ivan IV of Russia; Yuri Vasilevich
Names
- Vasily Ivanovich
- Dynasty: Rurik
- Father: Ivan III of Russia
- Mother: Sophia Paleologue
- Religion: Russian Orthodox

Vasili III Ivanovich (Russian: Василий III Иванович; Christian name: Gavriil; (Note: Russian: Гавриил.) monastic name: Varlaam; (Note: Russian: Варлаам.) 25 March 1479 – 3 December 1533) was Grand Prince of Moscow and all Russia from 1505 until his death in 1533.

He was the second son of Ivan III by his second wife Sophia Paleologue. Following on the ambitions of his father, Vasili annexed Pskov and Ryazan – the last remaining autonomous Russian territories – and captured the city of Smolensk from Lithuania. He also strengthened Russian influence in Kazan and the Volga region. Several nobles were exiled, sentenced, or executed for criticizing his policies.

== Early life ==
Vasili was the second son of Ivan III of Russia. Following the death of Ivan's eldest son, Ivan Molodoy, the young Ivan's son, Dmitry Ivanovich, became heir presumptive in 1490 and was later made grand prince and co-ruler in 1498 after a conspiracy against Dmitry by Vasili's supporters was uncovered and foiled. However, on 21 March 1499, Vasili was forgiven by his father and he was bestowed the title of grand prince of Novgorod and Pskov. In March 1501, Vasili was given the Beloozero principality, and the following year, Dmitry and his supporters fell out of favor with Ivan. On 11 April 1502, Dmitry and his mother Elena of Moldavia were arrested and placed under house arrest. Three days later, Ivan III named Vasili as his successor:

In the year 7010 [1502], on 14 April, a Thursday, the feast day of our Father among the saints St. Martin, Pope of Rome, Grand Prince Ivan Vasil'evich of All Russia showed favor upon [pozhaloval] his son Vasilii, and blessed him and seated him on the grand princely throne [na velikoe kniazhenie] of Vladimir and Moscow and of all Russia, Autocrat.

According to Sigismund von Herberstein, a diplomat who visited Russia in 1517, some 1,500 noble girls were brought together in the summer of 1505 for a bride-show. Vasili chose Solomonia Saburova and the two were married on 4 September 1505. The custom was introduced by Vasili's mother Sofia Paleologue, who herself was of Byzantine royalty, though she died before the wedding could take place. Vasili himself was a cultured man and proud of his imperial descent; he may have known the Greek language.

== Domestic policy ==
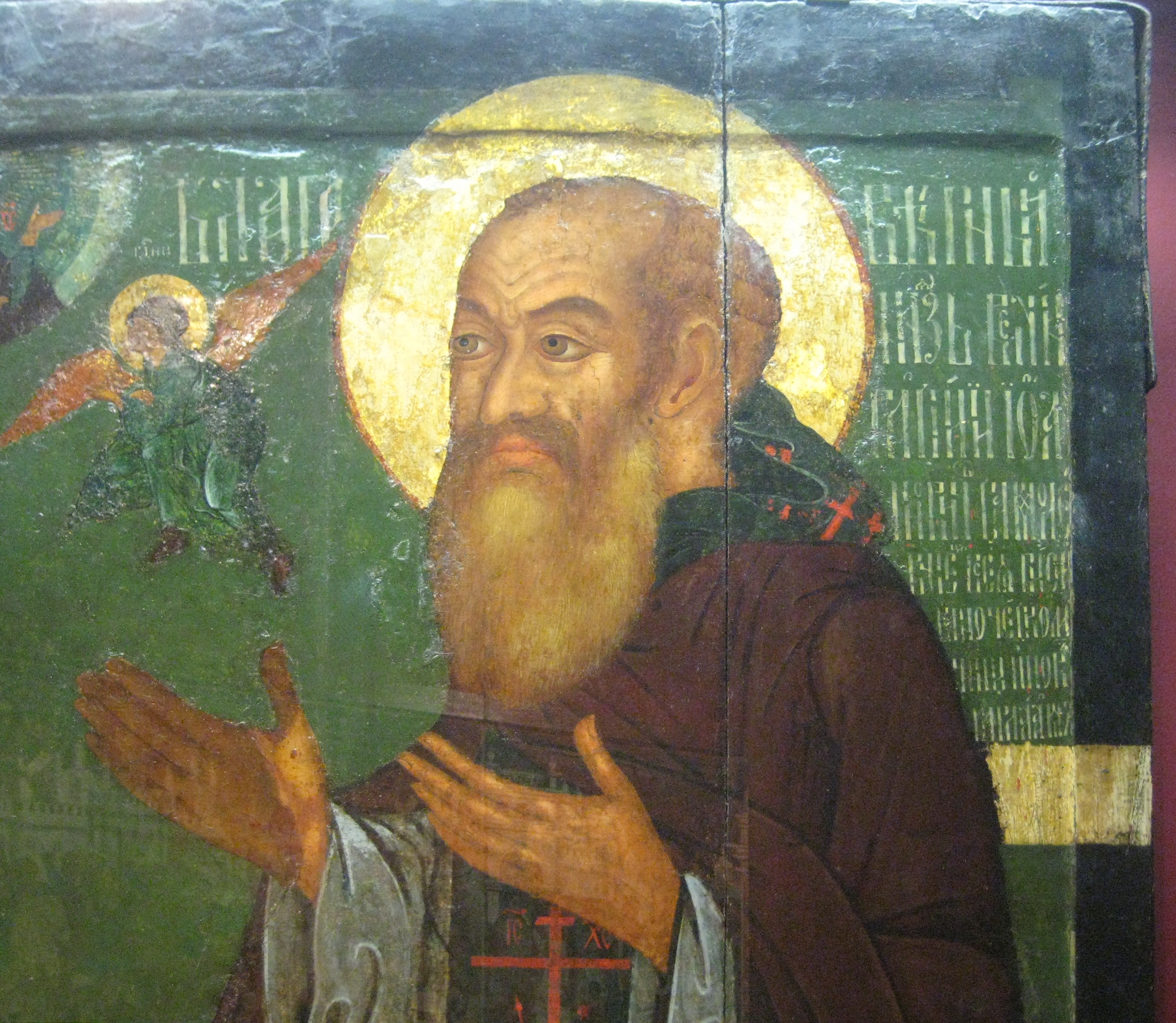
Fragment of the icon Vasili the Great and Grand Prince Vasili III, 16th century, State Historical Museum

Vasily III believed that nothing should limit the power of the Grand Prince. He enjoyed the active support of the church in the fight against the feudal boyar opposition, harshly dealing with all those who were dissatisfied. In 1521, Metropolitan bishop Varlaam was exiled due to his refusal to participate in Vasily's fight against Prince Vasili Ivanovich Shemyachich, princes Rurikovich Vasily Vasilyevich Shuisky and Ivan Vorotynsky were expelled. Diplomat and statesman Ivan Bersen-Beklemishev was executed in 1525 due to criticism of Vasily's policies, namely due to open rejection of Greek novelty, which came to Rus' with Sophia Paleologus.

During the reign of Vasily III, the landed nobility increased, the authorities actively limited the immunity and privileges of the boyars – the state followed the path of centralization. However, the despotic features of government, which were fully manifested already under his father Ivan III and grandfather Vasily the Dark, only intensified even more in the era of Vasily.

In church politics, Vasily, during his marriage to Solomonia, supported non-covetous people, and after his divorce from her and a quarrel because of this, both with his adviser, the monk Vassian, and with other people of the church and secular, he began to support Josephites, who supported him. Maxim the Greek, Vassian Patrikeev and other non-possessors were sentenced at church councils, some to death, some to imprisonment in monasteries due to fault-finding and slander against them.

During the reign of Vasily III, the "Code on Patrimonies" and the "Charter on Slobodas" were created (they are known from indirect sources, since the documents themselves have not been preserved). According to Sigismund von Herberstein, the power that Vasily had over his subjects, he surpassed all the monarchs of the world. On the front side of his seal there was the inscription: "Great Sovereign Basil, by the grace of God, king and lord of all Rus". On the reverse side it read: "Vladimir, Moscow, Novgorod, Pskov and Tver, and Yugorsk, and Perm, and many lands of the Sovereign".

The reign of Vasily is the era of the construction boom in Rus', which began during the reign of his father. The Cathedral of the Archangel was erected in the Moscow Kremlin and the Church of the Ascension of the Lord was built in Kolomenskoye. Stone fortifications are being built in Tula, Nizhny Novgorod, Kolomna and other cities. New settlements, forts, and fortresses are founded.

== Foreign policy ==
=== Unification of Russian lands ===
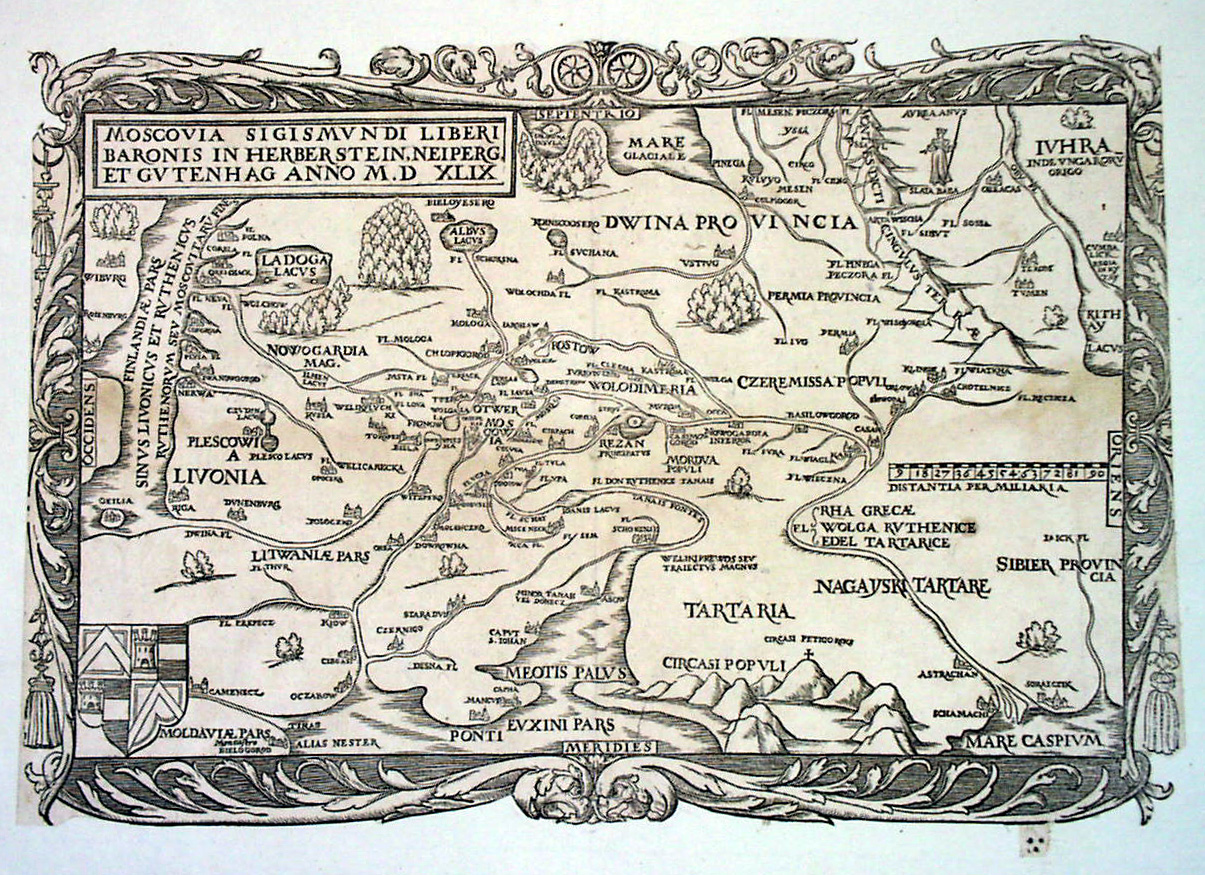
Map of Moscovia published by Sigismund von Herberstein in 1549

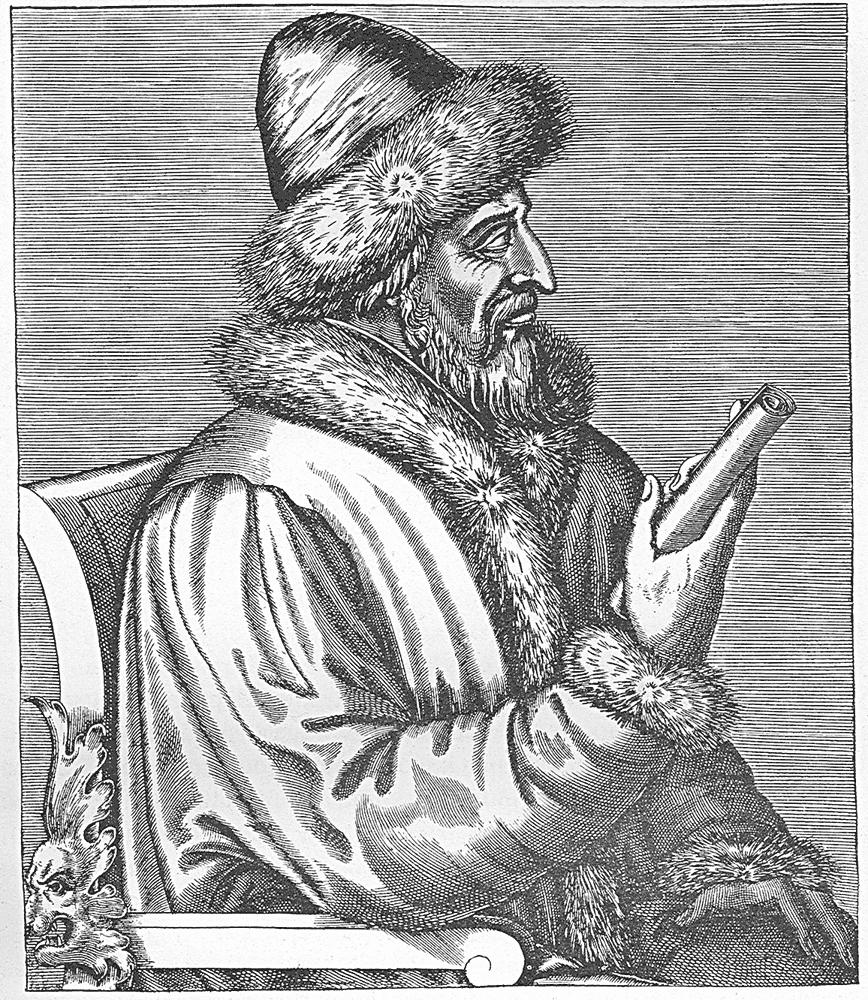
Engraving by André Thevet, 1584

Vasily III, in his policy towards other principalities, continued his father's policy of gathering of the Russian lands. He focused much of his reign on consolidating the territorial gains achieved by Ivan. Vasili annexed the last remaining autonomous provinces in Russia: the republic of Pskov in 1510 and the principality of Ryazan in 1521.

In 1509, while in Veliky Novgorod, Vasily ordered the Pskov mayor and other representatives of the city, including all the petitioners who were dissatisfied with them, to gather with him. Upon arriving at his place at the beginning of 1510 on the feast of Epiphany, the Pskovites were accused of distrust of the Grand Duke, and their governors were executed. The Pskovites were forced to ask Vasily to accept them into his patrimony. Vasily ordered to cancel the meeting. At the last veche in the history of the Pskov Republic, it was decided not to resist and to fulfill Vasily's demands. On 13 January, the veche bell was removed and, with tears, sent first to the Snetogorsky Monastery, and then to Moscow. On 24 January, Vasily arrived in Pskov and treated him in the same way as his father did with the Novgorod Republic in 1478. 300 of the most noble families of the city were resettled to Moscow lands, and their villages were given to Moscow service class people.

It was the turn of Ryazan, which had long been in Moscow's sphere of influence. In 1517, Vasily summoned to Moscow the Ryazan prince Ivan V Ivanovich, who was trying to enter into an alliance with the Crimean Khan, and ordered him to be put into custody (later Ivan was tonsured a monk and imprisoned in a monastery, and took his inheritance for himself in 1521. After Ryazan, the Starodub Principality was annexed in 1523. The Principality of Novgorod-Seversk also united with Moscow; its prince Vasili Ivanovich Shemyachich followed the example of the Prince of Ryazan, who was imprisoned in Moscow.

=== Wars against Lithuania ===
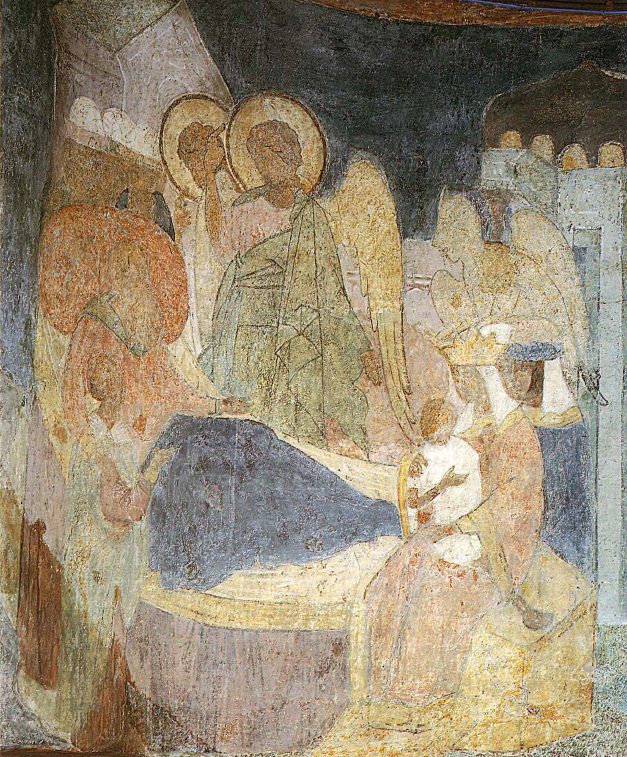
A unique composition in the mural painting of the Cathedral of the Archangel: The dying Vasily III lies on his bed, to the left of him is his son Ivan, receiving a blessing from his father; near the bed, wearing a crown symbolizing the rights of the regency, sits Elena Glinskaya with her son Yuri in her arms. The composition expresses the idea of the ideal death of the monarch.

In 1508, Vasily, taking advantage of the turmoil in the Grand Duchy of Lithuania following the death of the Lithuanian prince Alexander Jagiellon, put forward his candidacy for the throne of Gediminas. In 1508, the rebellious Lithuanian boyar Michael Glinski was received very warmly in Moscow. The war with Lithuania led to a rather favorable peace for the Moscow prince in 1509, under which the Lithuanians recognized his father's conquests.

Vasili also took advantage of the difficult position of Sigismund I the Old in the Kingdom of Poland. In 1512, a new war with Lithuania began. On 19 December, Vasily, Yuri Ivanovich, and Dmitry Zhilka set out on campaign. Principality of Smolensk, the great eastern fortress of Lithuania, was besieged, chiefly through the aid of the rebel Lithuanian prince Michael Glinski, who provided him with artillery and engineers.

On 14 June, Vasily set out on campaign again, but, having sent his commanders to Smolensk, he himself remained in Borovsk, awaiting further action. Smolensk was again besieged, and its governor, Yuri Sologub, was defeated in the open. Only then did Vasily personally return to his troops. But this siege was also unsuccessful: the besieged managed to rebuild what had been destroyed. Having devastated the city's environs, Vasily ordered a retreat and the Russian army returned to Moscow in March 1513.

On 8 July 1514, the army led by the Grand Duke marched on Smolensk for the third time; this time, Vasily was accompanied by his brothers Yuri and Semyon. A new siege began on 29 July. The artillery, commanded by the gunner Stefan, inflicted heavy losses on the besieged. That same day, Sologub and the city's clergy came to Vasily and agreed to surrender the city. On 31 July, the residents of Smolensk swore allegiance to the Grand Duke, and Vasily entered the city on 1 August.

The capture of Smolensk, the result of the three Siege of Smolensk campaigns, became Vasily III's greatest military success in the western direction during his entire reign. The loss of Smolensk was an important injury inflicted by Russia on Lithuania in the course of the Lithuanian–Muscovite War (1512–1522) and only the exigencies of Sigismund compelled him to acquiesce in its surrender (1522). Soon, the Lithuanian fortresses of Mstislav, Krichev and Dubrovno were also captured.

But Glinsky, to whom the Polish chronicles attributed the success of the third campaign, entered into negotiations with King Sigismund I. He hoped to receive Smolensk as a fiefdom from Vasily III, but the sovereign decided otherwise. The conspiracy was soon exposed, and Glinsky himself was imprisoned in Moscow. Some time later, the Russian army, commanded by Ivan Chelyadinov, suffered a heavy defeat at Orsha, but the Lithuanians were never able to recapture Smolensk. The conspiracy was soon exposed, and Glinsky himself was imprisoned in Moscow. In 1522, a treaty was signed that called for a five-year truce, no prisoner exchange, and for Moscow to retain control of Smolensk. The truce was subsequently extended to 1534.

=== Wars against Kazan ===
Vasili saw some success against the Crimean Khanate. Although in 1519 his armies were defeated along the Oka River and he was obliged to buy off the Crimean khan, Mehmed I Giray, under the very walls of Moscow, towards the end of his reign he established Russian influence on the Volga. In 1531–1532 he placed the pretender Cangali khan on the throne of Khanate of Kazan.

In 1518, the Moscow-friendly Shah Ali Khan became khan of the Khanate of Kazan, but his reign was short-lived: in 1521, he was overthrown by his protégé Sahib I Giray from Crimean Khanate. That same year, fulfilling his alliance obligations with Sigismund I Old, the Crimean Khan Mehmed I Giray declared the Crimean invasion of Russia (1521). He was joined by the Kazan Khan, who joined forces with the Krymchaks and Kazan citizens near Kolomna.

The Muscovite army was defeated on the Oka River and forced to retreat. The Tatars approached the walls of Moscow. Vasily himself, meanwhile, left the capital for Volokolamsk to gather an army. Mehmed Giray had no intention of taking the city: having devastated the surrounding area, he turned back south, fearing the Astrakhan people and the army Vasily had assembled.

However, he extracted from Vasily III a treaty formalising his status as a loyal tributary and vassal of the Crimean Khanate. On the way back, having besieged Pereyaslavl-Ryazansky, defended by the voivode Khabar Simsky, the khan began to demand the surrender of the city on the basis of this charter. But, having asked the Tatar ambassadors to come to his headquarters with this written commitment, Ivan Vasilyevich Obrazets-Dobrynsky (this was Khabar's family name) kept the letter and dispersed the Tatar army with cannons.

In 1521, Vasili received an emissary of the neighboring Iranian Safavid Empire, sent by Shah Ismail I whose ambitions were to construct an Irano-Russian alliance against the common enemy, the Ottoman Empire. In 1522, Moscow again expected the Crimeans; Vasily and his army even stood on the Oka. The Khan never arrived, but the danger from the steppe had not passed.

In 1523, following another massacre of Russian merchants in Kazan, Vasily declared a new campaign. Having devastated the khanate, on his return journey, he founded the city of Vasilsursk on the Sura (a tributary of the Volga), which was intended to become a new, secure trading post with the Kazan Tatars. In 1524, Prince Ivan Belsky led the 150,000-strong Russian army against the Tatar capital. After that, the third campaign against Kazan, Sahib Giray, a Crimean ally, was overthrown, and Safa Giray was proclaimed khan in his place.

In 1527, Islam I Giray's attack on Moscow was repelled. Russian troops took up defensive positions 20 km from the Oka River. The siege of Moscow and Kolomna lasted five days, after which the Muscovite army crossed the Oka River and routed the Crimean army at the Osetr River. Another steppe invasion was repelled. In 1531, at the request of the people of Kazan, the Kasimov prince Dzhan-Ali Khan was proclaimed khan, but he did not last long - after the death of Vasily, he was overthrown by the local nobility.

=== Relations with Europe ===
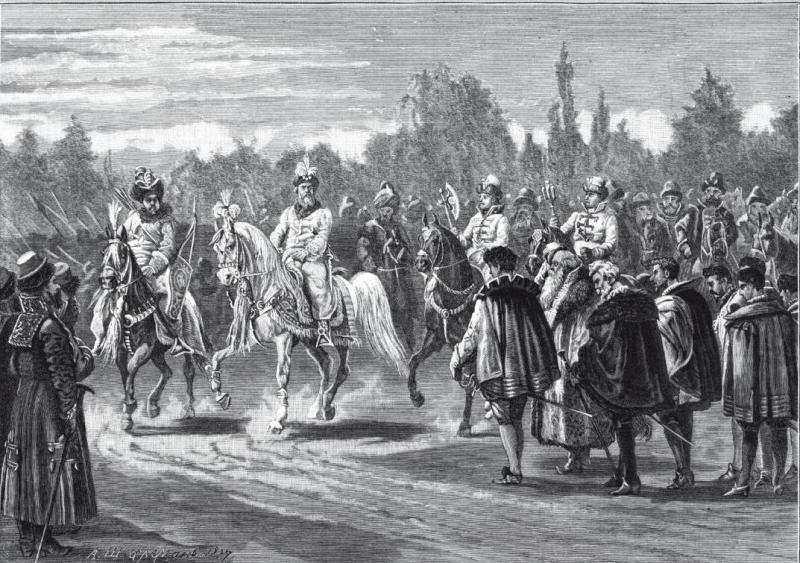
Russia's Grand Prince Vasily III meets ambassadors of Holy Roman Emperor Charles V near Mozhaysk

Unlike his son, Ivan IV, Vasili did not officially hold the title of tsar within Russia; however, externally, such as in diplomatic documents produced by and for the Holy Roman Empire, he would alternatively be called tsar, grand prince, or, as by Maximilian I, kayser. In this naming custom, as well as in using the double-headed eagle of the Byzantine Empire, Vasili continued practices begun by his father and predecessor, Ivan III.

The seal and the introduction of Byzantine ceremonies and court etiquette seem to have been inspired by Vasili's mother Sophia Paleologue. Like his father, Vasili fought for recognition of the equality of the titles of tsar and emperor by other European monarchs. He achieved some success in 1514, when the Holy Roman Emperor implicitly recognized the Russians' insistence to be treated as an equal, whether this was by accident or by design. The letter by Maximilian I was later used by Peter the Great (r. 1682–1725) when he proclaimed himself as imperator of Russia.

== Family ==
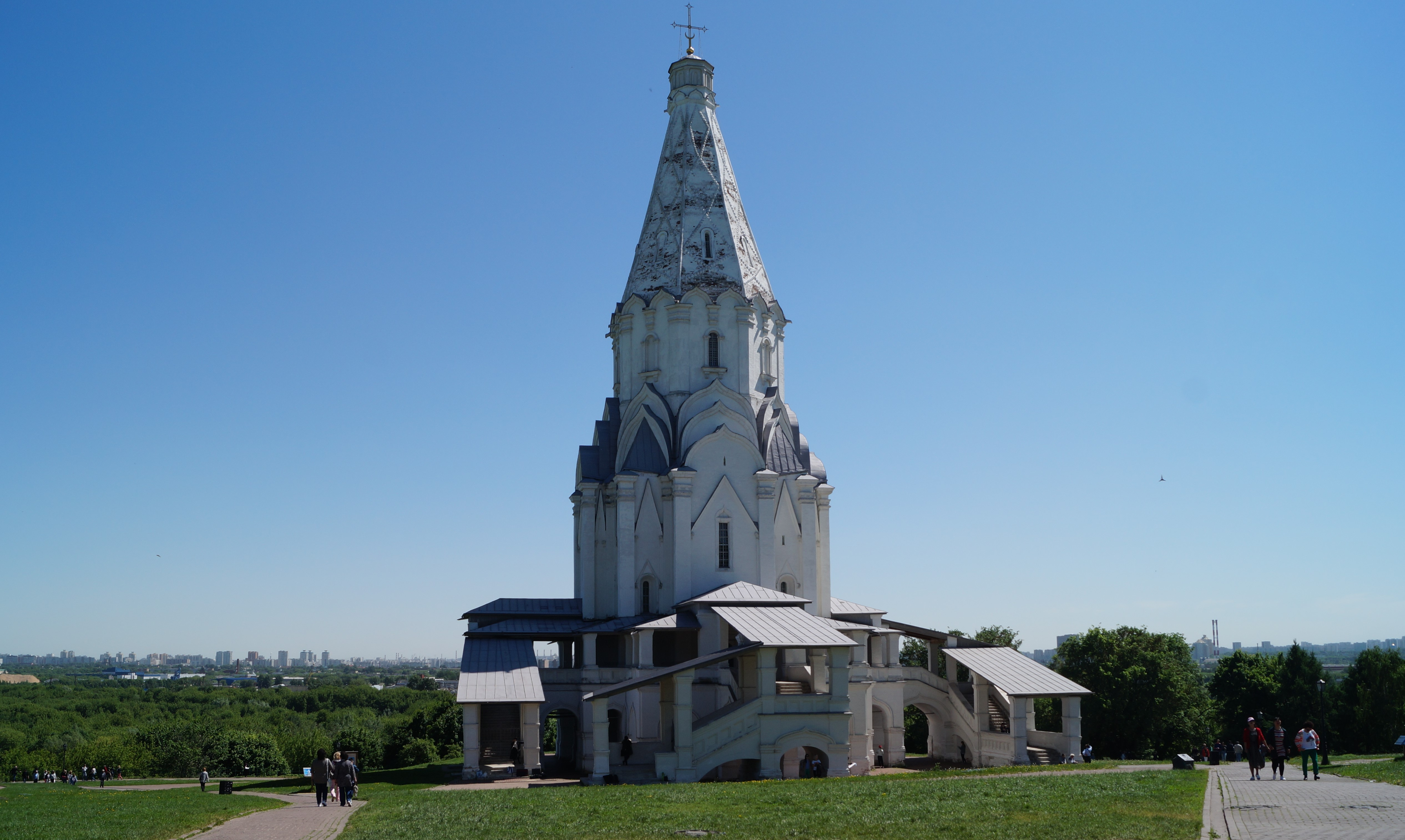
The Church of Ascension was built by Vasili III to commemorate the birth of his heir.

By 1526 when he was 47 years old, Vasili had been married to Solomonia Saburova for over 20 years with no heir to his throne being produced. Conscious of her husband's disappointment, Solomonia tried to remedy this by consulting sorcerers and going on pilgrimages. When this proved unsuccessful, Vasili consulted the boyars, announcing that he did not trust his two brothers to handle Russia's affairs and forbade them to marry anyone.

The boyars suggested that he take a new wife. A divorce due to wife sterility was unlawful, so he falsely accused her of witchcraft, and despite much opposition from the clergy, he divorced his barren wife, exiled her to a monastery, exiled the opposed clergy and soon married Princess Elena Glinskaya, the daughter of a Serbian princess and niece of his friend Michael Glinski. Not many of the boyars approved of his choice, as Elena was of Catholic upbringing.

Vasili was so smitten that he defied Russian social norms and trimmed his beard to appear younger. After three days of matrimonial festivity, the couple consummated their marriage, though initially it appeared that Elena was as sterile as Solomonia. The Russian nobility began to suspect this was a sign of God's disapproval of the marriage. However, to the great joy of Vasili and the populace, the new tsaritsa gave birth to a son, who would succeed him as Ivan IV. Three years later, a second son, Yuri, was born.

Vasily III had three brothers: Yuri (born in 1480), Simeon (born in 1487) and Andrei (born in 1490), as well as five sisters: Elena (born and died in 1474), Feodosiya (born and died in 1475), another Elena (born 1476), another Feodosiya (born 1485) and Eudoxia (born 1492).

== Death ==
Whilst out hunting on horseback near Volokolamsk, Vasili felt a great pain in his right hip, the result of an abscess. He was transported to the village of Kolp, where he was visited by two German doctors who were unable to stop the infection with conventional remedies. Believing that his time was short, Vasili requested to be returned to Moscow, where he was kept in the Saint Joseph Cathedral along the way. By 25 November 1533, Vasili reached Moscow and asked to be made a monk before dying. Taking on the name Varlaam, Vasili died at midnight, 3 December 1533.

== Title ==
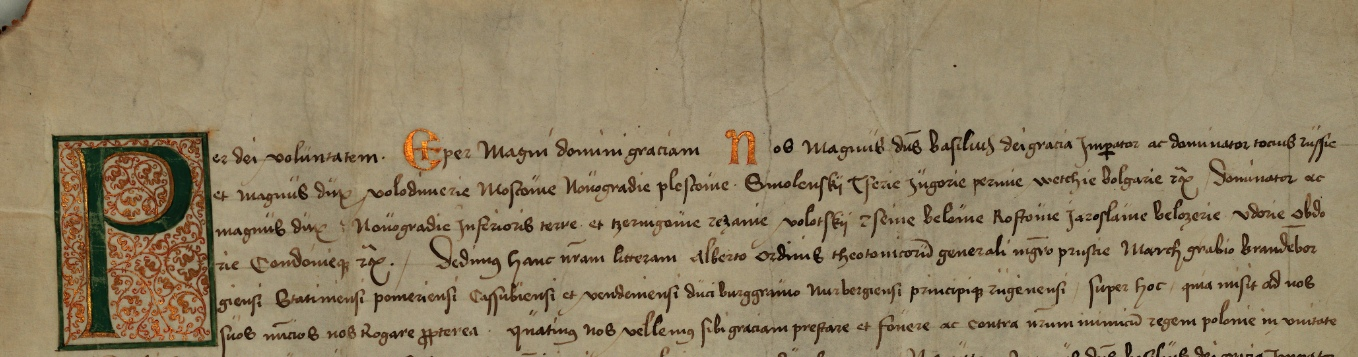
Latin version of the Russian-Teutonic Treaty of 1517, where Vasily III is named Emperor and Sovereign of All Rus' (Imperator ac dominator tocius Russie)

After 1514, the full title used by Vasili in his foreign correspondence was:

By the Grace of God, the Tsar and Sovereign of All Russia and the Grand Prince of Vladimir, Moscow, Novgorod, Pskov, Smolensk, Tver, Yugorsk, Perm, Vyatka and Bulgar, and others, the Sovereign and Grand Prince of Novgorod of the Lower Land, and Chernigov, and Ryazan, Volotsk, Rzhev, Belyov, Rostov, Yaroslavl, Beloozero, Udoria, Obdoria and Kondia.

Unlike his son, he did not officially accept the title of "Tsar", for which he received praise from the abbot of the Novgorod Khutyn Monastery, Theodosius: "In everything he showed us an example of the sovereign, for the sake of humility he did not call himself a tsar." In the treaty with Emperor Maximilian I in 1514, for the first time in the history of Rus', he was called at the interstate level the emperor ("Kaiser") of the Rus'.

== In popular culture ==
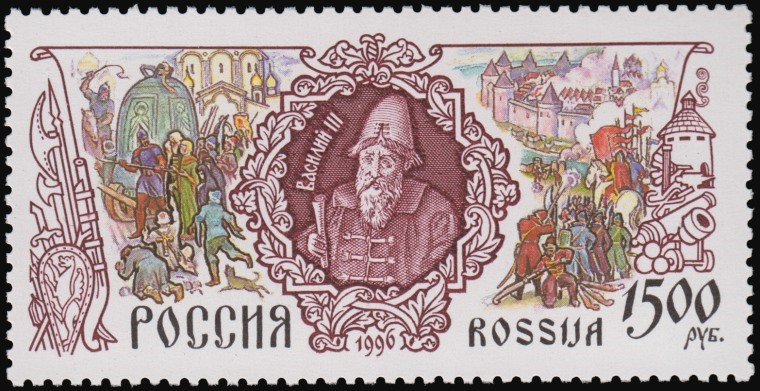
Russian Post stamp dedicated to Vasily III, 1996

Vasili was the subject of the opera Neprigozhaya by composer Ella Adayevskaya. In the TV series "Ivan the Terrible" (2009, dir. Andrey Eshpai), the role of Vasili III was played by Vladislav Vetrov. In the TV series "Sophia" (2016), the role of Vasily III as a child was played by Anatoly Naumov.

== See also ==
- Bibliography of Russian history (1223–1613)
- Family tree of Russian monarchs

== Bibliography ==
- Bushkovitch, Paul (5 December 2011). A Concise History of Russia. Cambridge University Press. ISBN 978-1-139-50444-7.
- Crummey, Robert O. (6 June 2014). The Formation of Muscovy 1300 - 1613. Routledge. ISBN 978-1-317-87200-9.
- Elton, G. R. (1990). The New Cambridge Modern History: Volume 2, The Reformation, 1520-1559. Cambridge University Press. ISBN 978-0-521-34536-1.
- Filyushkin, A. I. (2006). Титулы русских государей (in Russian). Альянс-Архео. ISBN 978-5-98874-011-7.
- Madariaga, Isabel de (25 September 2006). Ivan the Terrible. Yale University Press. ISBN 978-0-300-11973-2.
- Martin, Russell (12 June 2019). "Anticipatory association of the heir in early modern Russia". The Routledge History of Monarchy. Routledge. ISBN 978-1-351-78730-7.
- Soloviev, Sergei M. (1976). Graham, Hugh F. (ed.). History of Russia. The Age of Vasily III. Vol. 9. Gulf Breeze: Academic International Press. ISBN 978-0875690667.
- Wilson, Peter H. (4 April 2016). Heart of Europe: A History of the Holy Roman Empire. Harvard University Press. ISBN 978-0-674-05809-5.

Regnal titles
Preceded by Ivan III	Grand Prince of Moscow; 1505–1533	Succeeded by Ivan IV
