= Kudeyar =

Russian legendary folk hero

Kudeyar (Russian: Кудеяр) is a legendary robber, a Russian folk hero.

There were several Cossack robbers of this name. There is a letter of one Muscovite boyar to Ivan IV from Crimea, where he reports that "there is only one brigand left here - the accursed Kudeyar".

According to one legend, Kudeyar was the elder brother of Ivan the Terrible, based on a real event. His mother purportedly was Solomonida Saburova, whom Vasily III divorced on account of her barrenness and incarcerated in a convent. The legend says that several months after the controversial divorce she bore a son, who was smuggled somewhere. While it is the most common legend, there is no evidence that Ivan the Terrible had a brother.

== In fiction ==
Kudeyar's story is told in Mykola Kostomarov's 1875 historical novel of the same name.

There are other literary works involving Kudeyar.
