= Zarya (opera) =

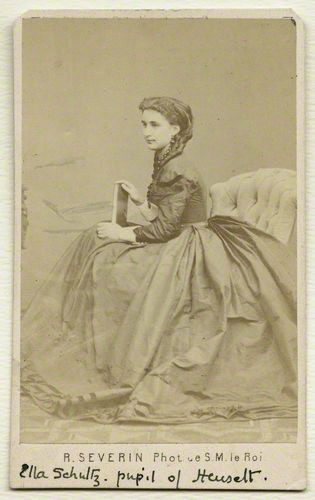
Ella Adayevskaya

Zarya svobody (Russian Заря свободы, German Morgenröte der Freiheit, English The Dawn of Freedom), is an opera in four acts composed between 1873 and 1877 by Ella Adayevskaya (the pseudonym adopted by the composer Elizaveta von Schultz).

== Composition ==
The opera, which was listed by Adayevskaya as her Op. 8, has a libretto by Richard Genée, translated into Russian by Adayevskaya herself. A manuscript piano score bears the title, in German, Die Morgenröte der Freiheit. The opera bears a dedication to Tsar Alexander II.

== Synopsis ==
The opera takes place in Little Russia (present-day Ukraine) in 1762. Olga and Pierre have loved each other since childhood, but he is a serf and not of the legal social status to marry her. Olga is encouraged to marry the wicked Nyrkoff, and eventually agrees to do so if he will arrange Pierre's freedom. However, when Pierre learns of Olga's potential sacrifice for his sake, he commits suicide. The marriage is therefore forestalled and Olga retires to a convent, leaving Nyrkoff to his rancour. The opera ends with a prophetic chorus of peasants praising Alexander II's 1861 abolition of serfdom.

== Performances ==
The work was not approved by the Russian censors of the period. No complete performances are documented. The overture and peasant's chorus from the opera were performed at the Théâtre des Italiens in Paris on 23 April 1877; the composer took part in this performance at the piano. On 23 March 1886, the overture and chorus, (the latter arranged for orchestra) were played at a concert at the University of Dorpat (now Tartu, Estonia). In the twentieth century the overture was played at a concert in Saalfeld on 5 May 1953.
