= Lithuanian–Muscovite War (1512–1522) =

1512–1522 part of the Muscovite-Lithuanian Wars

- Part of Muscovite–Lithuanian Wars
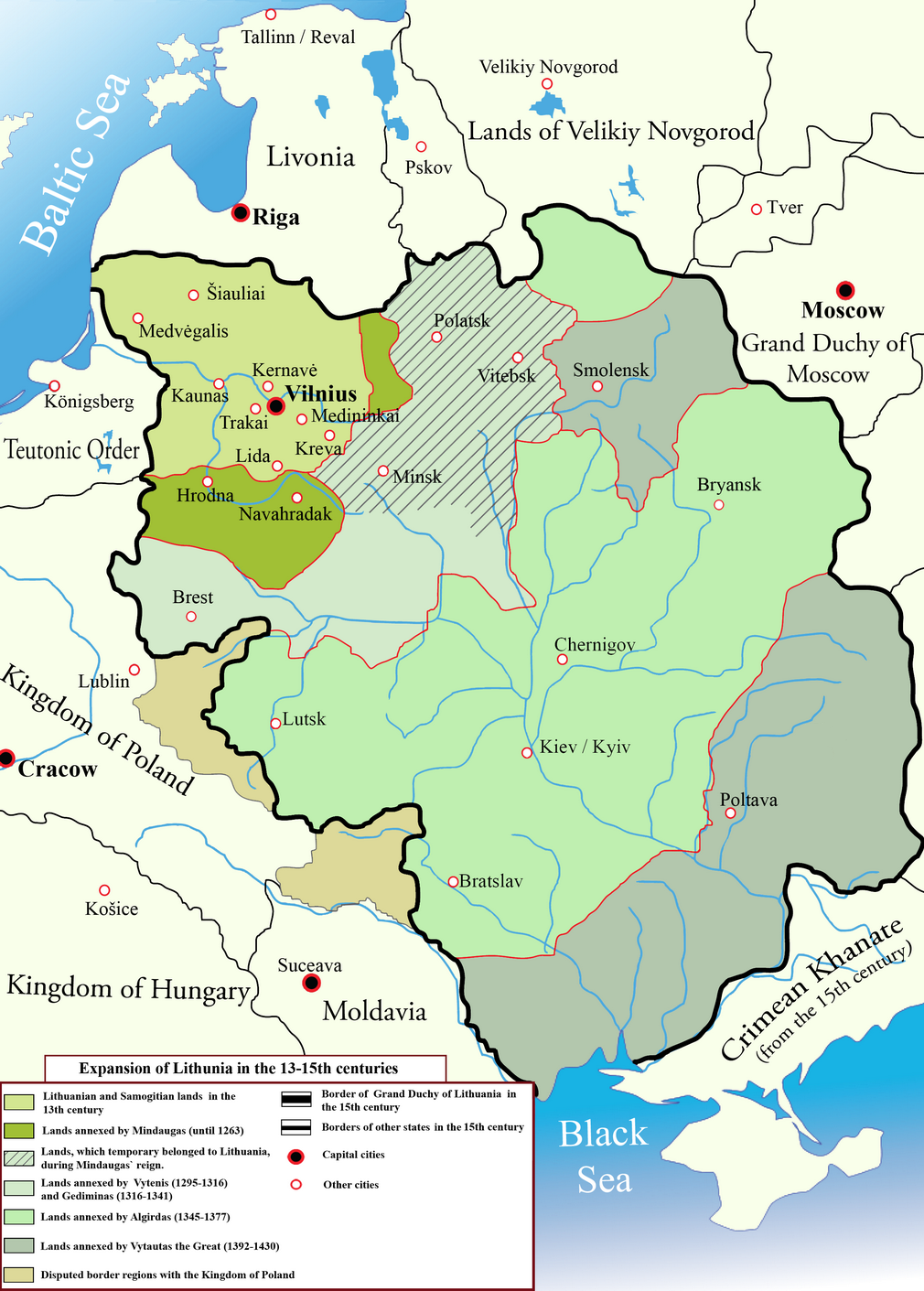
- Grand Duchy of Lithuania in the 13–15th centuries
Date	1512–1522
Location	Belarus, Severia, Smolensk
Result	Muscovite victory
Territorial changes	Muscovy Captures Smolensk

Belligerents
Grand Principality of Moscow	Grand Duchy of Lithuania; Crown of the Kingdom of Poland

Commanders and leaders
Vasili III of Russia	Sigismund I the Old

The Lithuanian–Muscovite War of 1512–1522 (also known as the Ten Years' War) was a military conflict between the Grand Duchy of Lithuania and Ruthenia, which included Ukrainian and Belarusian lands, and the Grand Principality of Moscow for Russian border lands.

== Reasons ==
In the two previous wars, the Moscow state did not succeed in realizing the idea of regaining all the "Kievan inheritance" – the lands of Principality of Smolensk, Principality of Polotsk and Principality of Kiev. The Grand Duchy of Lithuania did not accept the results of these wars - the loss of some of its eastern lands. At the end of 1512 a new war broke out between the two states. The reason for this was the Lithuanian-Crimean Tatar negotiations and the attack of the Crimean Tatars in May 1512 on the Upper Oka Principalities.

== War ==
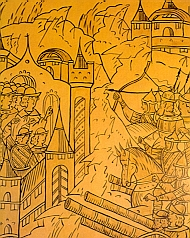
Siege of Vasili III around Smolensk

The Moscow government accused the Lithuanians of inciting the Crimean Khanate into Moscow's lands, and in November of that year organized a campaign of troops against Polotsk and Smolensk.

Soon the troops were withdrawn from Polotsk, they remained near Smolensk until March 1513, after which the siege was lifted. In June 1513, Moscow troops launched an offensive in four directions in order to capture Smolensk, Polotsk, Vitebsk and Orsha.

The fighting continued until November and ended in vain for Moscow. At the end of May 1514, Moscow troops launched a third offensive on Smolensk. Despite the successful defense of the city, part of the local aristocracy and clergy moved to the side of Moscow, which led to the capitulation of Smolensk on July 31, 1514. Soon the Moscow regiments captured Mstislaw, Krychew and Dubrowna. However, the Moscow side failed to develop success. On September 8, 1514, near Orsha, the Lithuanian army (30,000 men, under the command of Ukrainian nobleman Konstanty Ostrogski) defeated the Moscow army (40,000 soldiers, under the command of Prince I. Chelyadnin). Soon Lithuania managed to return Mstislaw, Krychew and Dubrowna. At the same time, Lithuanians together with Crimean Tatars carried out several attacks on the Severia region.

However, Smolensk remained under the Moscow rule. At the beginning of 1515, the Lithuanians, together with the Crimean Tatars, repeated the attack on the Seversky lands. Later, Moscow regiments marched near Roslavl, Polotsk, Vitebsk, and Mstislavl, and Lithuanians operated near Velyki Luki.

In September 1517, peace talks began in Moscow. However, they did not cease hostilities. In October, the Lithuanian army made an unsuccessful attempt to capture Opochka. In the summer of 1518, the Moscow leadership tried to resume large-scale hostilities against Lithuania. His troops attacked Polotsk, Vitebsk, Slutsk. However, the victory was for the Lithuanians.

The following year, Moscow repeated the offensive with greater force. From Pskov, Smolensk, and Starodub, its regiments attacked Polotsk, Vitebsk, Orsha, Mogilev, Minsk, Kreva, Ashmyany, and Maladzyechna. In February 1520, Moscow troops repeated the attack on Polotsk and Vitebsk. During the year Ostap Dashkevych took part in the Crimean campaign.

== Result ==
On September 2, 1520, a truce was signed in Moscow for six months, and on December 25, 1522, a new truce was established for five years. According to him, Smolensk remained on the Moscow side. Grand Duke of Moscow Vasily III Ivanovich refused to exchange prisoners.
