= Notes on Muscovite Affairs =

Book on 16th-century Russian customs

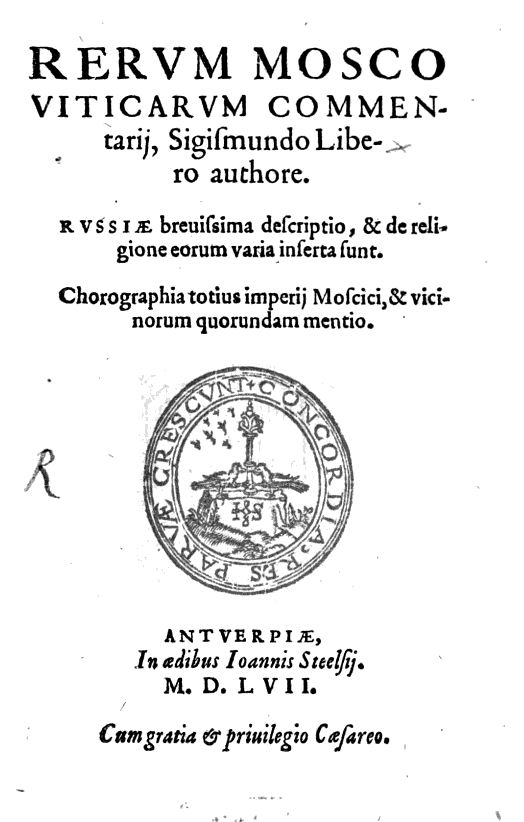
Notes on Muscovite Affairs, edition printed in Antwerp, 1557

Notes on Muscovite Affairs (Rerum Moscoviticarum Commentarii) (1549) was a Latin book by Baron Sigismund von Herberstein on the geography, history and customs of the Grand Duchy of Moscow. The book was the main early source of knowledge about Russia in Western Europe.

== Background ==
Herberstein was an Austrian diplomat who was twice sent to Russia as Austrian ambassador, in 1517 and 1526. Born in Vipava (German Wippach), Carniola, he was familiar with Slovene, which became important later on his mission in Russia, when he was able to communicate with ordinary Russians as Slovene and Russian are both Slavic languages.

These visits occurred at a time when very little was known about Russia outside the region. The few published descriptions of Russia were in some cases wildly inaccurate.

== Historical note on Muscovy and Russia ==
The Grand Duchy of Moscow, commonly referred to in the west as Muscovy, in the 16th century was one of the Russian states which emerged after the collapse of Kievan Rus' under pressure from the Golden Horde. Beginning in the early 15th Century, the Princes of Moscow began asserting their claim as the sole inheritor of the legacy of Kievan Rus'. Moscow would annex many of the other Russian principalities and would evolve into the Tsardom of Russia under Ivan the Terrible starting in the middle of the 16th century. Russia was the region, Moscow was the state until it was formally reorganized into the Russian Tsardom in 1547. Moscow was then ruled by the Muscovite monarchy, starting with Daniel of Moscow (1282–1303), who founded the Principality of Moscow, which under Ivan III saw rapid expansion, and ending with Ivan IV, who claimed the title "Tsar of Russia" and proclaimed the Tsardom of Russia in 1547.

In this article, Russia and Muscovy are treated as similar entities. In land area there is not much difference between Muscovy and Russia west of the Ural Mountains. Herberstein wrote about Muscovy (region based on Moscow) because that is what it was known as in the West then. We know the area as Russia, so that is how it is referred to here.

== Research ==
Herberstein developed a keen interest in all things Russian, and researched in several ways:

- using his knowledge of Slavic, he questioned a variety of people on a wide range of topics.
- careful review of existing publications on Russia, comparing what he read with his own observations. He viewed most publications skeptically, because he knew that most of the authors had not been able to actually visit Russia.
- corroboration. He was careful to make sure not to accept anything that was not well corroborated. As he wrote, he "did not rely upon this or that man's account, but trusted only to the unvarying statements of many."
- investigation of Russian written publications, which provided him with information on Russian culture completely unavailable at the time in Europe.

== Content ==
As a result, Herberstein was able to produce the first detailed eyewitness ethnography of Russia, encyclopedic in its scope, providing a view that was very accurate for the time of trade, religion, customs, politics, history and even a theory of Russian political culture.

The book contributed greatly to a European view held for several centuries of Russia as a despotic absolute monarchy. That view was not new, but previous writers had presented an idealized view. Herberstein influenced the development of his view in two ways:

- He accentuated the absolute power of the monarchy even more than previous works had done. Writing about the Russian Tsar, Herberstein wrote that "in the power he holds over his people the ruler of Muscovy surpasses all the monarchs of the world."
- He presented a view of Russian political culture quite opposite to that argued by other writers. Although others claimed Russians were fanatically loyal to their ruler and treated in return with great fairness, Herberstein saw and wrote differently.

His investigations made it clear that Muscovy, contrary to the view of fanatical loyalty, had suffered a violent political struggle and that Muscovy had emerged only very recently as the dominant power in the region. Besides the man who achieved the unification of Muscovy, Ivan III was characterized by Herberstein as a cruel tyrant, drunk, and a misogynist, far from being a ruler of great fairness and equity.

His description of Ivan's unification campaign was a series of banishments and forced relocations of whole populations to break the power of regional rulers. That culminated in Ivan's "plan of ejecting all princes and others from the garrisons and fortified places" and all formerly-independent princes of Russia "being either moved by the grandeur of his achievements or stricken with fear, became subject to him.". All was very much at odds with previous-perceived reality but much closer to currently-understood Russian history. Similarly, the previously-touted ideal of the fairness of the Muscovy monarchy was contrasted with Herberstein's depiction of peasants as being in "a very wretched condition, for their goods are exposed to plunder from the nobility and soldiery".

== Tsar vs Czar ==
Heberstein first recorded the spelling of "czar" for the Russian title of "tsar" (Russian царь, IPA [t͡sɑrʲ]). This may cause confusion nowadays because the ⟨cz⟩ digraph is today only used in the Polish language and is there pronounced as [t͡ʃ]. However, early modern German (as Herberstein spoke and wrote it) and furthermore also pre-20th century Hungarian or the 'mazurating' dialects of Polish used ⟨cz⟩ for [t͡s]. Contrary to what ⟨cz⟩ might suggest, all Slavic languages pronounce the title "tsar" with [t͡s]. English and French changed the spelling from ⟨cz⟩ to ⟨ts⟩ in the 19th century to better reflect the pronunciation.

== English translations ==
Marshall Poe, who has written extensively on Herberstein and Russian history generally, uses the English title Notes on the Muscovites consistently when translating the Latin title. A slightly more precise English translation of the Latin title would be Notes on Muscovite Affairs, as used for this article. There are one partial and two complete English translations of this work, the most recent one, by J. B. C. Grundy, based itself on a German version.

- Notes upon Russia: being a translation of the earliest account of that country, entitled Rerum moscoviticarum commentarii by the Baron Sigismund von Herberstein. Translated and edited by R. H. Major, London: Hakluite Society, 1851-1852, 2 vols.; reprint, New York: B. Franklin, 1963
- Description of Moscow and Muscovy, 1557, Sigmund von Herberstein. Edited by Bertold Picard, translated by J. B. C. Grundy, London: Dent, New York: Barnes & Noble, 1966

== External links and references ==
Online editions:

- Digital reproduction of the English translation by R. H. Major, 1851-52
- Digital reproduction of the Latin edition of 1571
- Digital reproduction of the German edition of 1557
- Digital reproduction of the Italian edition of 1550
- Digital reproduction of the princeps edition of 1549
- Latin text of Rerum Moscoviticarum Commentarii, together with the early German version
- For the Russian text of Herberstein's book, see http://stepanov01.narod.ru/library/herb/herb00.htm
- For searching digital reprints and other online versions of related source materials and maps see the Meeting of Frontiers project at the Library of Congress.

Others:

- The main English source of information on Rerum Moscoviticarum Commentarii and Herberstein is Marshall Poe's publications, particularly Herberstein and Origin of the European Image of Muscovite Government, which cites many other contemporary publications such as Giorgio, Fabri and Campense. See also the notes above in the section English Translations.
- Herberstein, Sigismund von. Description of Moscow and Muscovy (1557). Ed. Bertold Picard; trans. J. B. C. Grundy. London: J. M. Dent and Sons Limited, 1969.
- For the derivation of tsar and Herberstein's contribution of czar, see the Oxford English Dictionary, 2nd edition, entry on tsar.
