= Georg Julius von Schultz =

Baltic German academic, Estophile

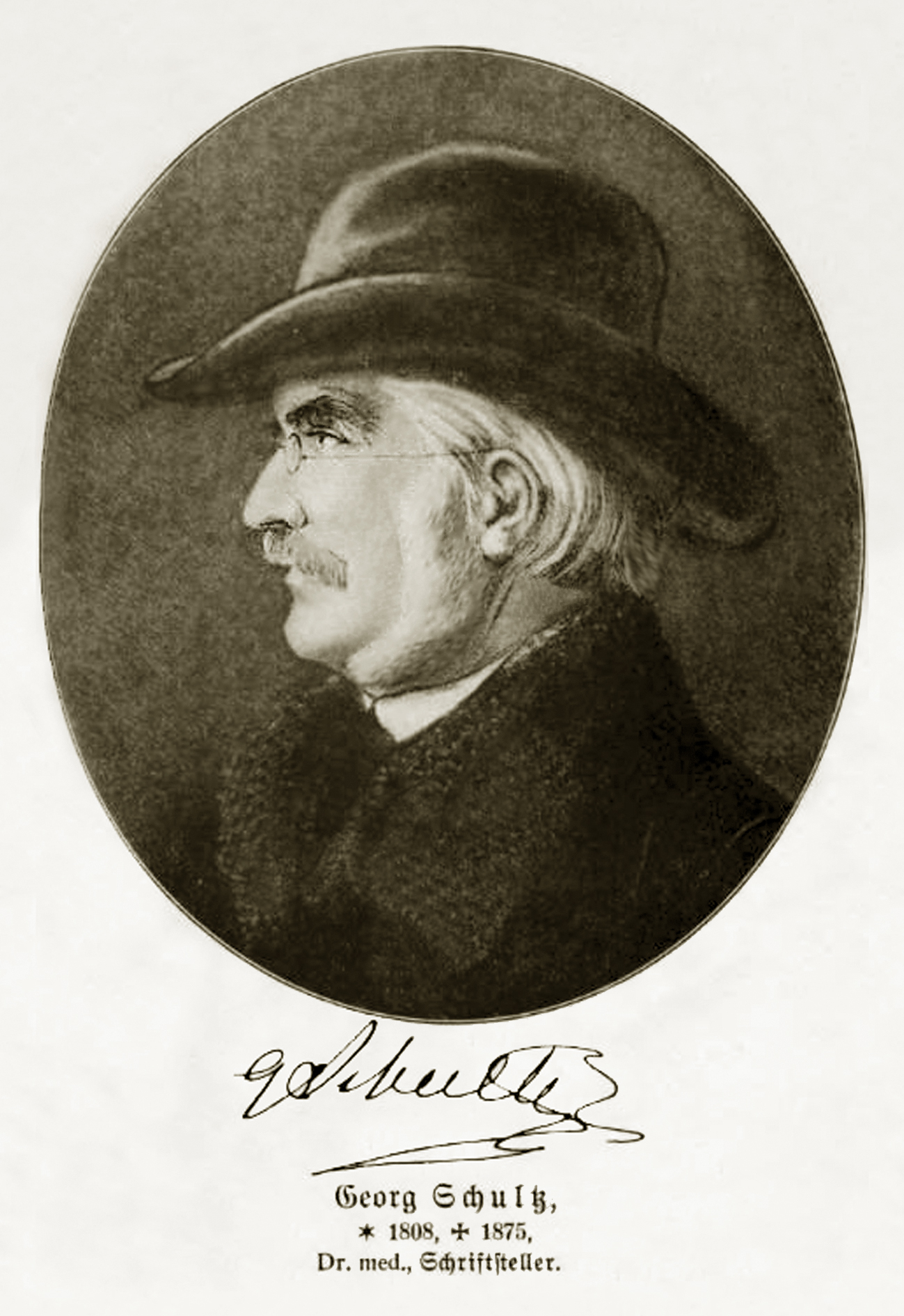
Georg Julius von Schultz

Georg Julius von Schultz (October 4, 1808 – May 16, 1875; Old Style: September 22, 1808 – May 4, 1875), also known under his pseudonym Dr. Bertram, was a prominent Estophile of Baltic German heritage. A friend of Friedrich Reinhold Kreutzwald, he was instrumental in the latter's decision to develop Kalevipoeg.

His daughter was the composer and pianist Ella Adayevskaya.

== Sources ==
- Ylo M. Pärnik (2006). Dr. Georg Julius von Schultz (dr. Bertram): läbilõige ühe Balti idealisti maailmavaatest Eesti kultuuriloo üldpildis. ISBN 978-9985-77-200-3.
- Georg Julius Schultz-Bertram; Peeter Olesk (2004). Briefe eines baltischen Idealisten an seine Mutter 1833–1875. ISBN 978-9985-77-111-2.
- Cornelius Hasselblatt 2006: Geschichte der estnischen Literatur. Von den Anfängen bis zur Gegenwart
