= Andrzej Niemirowicz =

Lithuanian noble (1462–1540)

Andrzej Niemirowicz (1462–1540) was a Lithuanian-Ruthenian noble, soldier and statesman. In 1514, he became voivode of Kiev, and in 1535, he became the second hetman of the Grand Duchy of Lithuania.
