= New Books Network =

Podcast network featuring author-interviews

- Genre: Author interviews, public education
- Format: Interview
- Country of origin: United States
- Language: English

Creative team
- Created by: Marshall Poe

Production
- Length: 30 minutes to 2 hours

Publication
- No. of episodes: 29,000+
- Original release: 2007
- Provider: Independent
- Updates: 70 episodes per week

Related
- Website: newbooksnetwork.com

The New Books Network (NBN) is a podcast network featuring interviews with scholars, researchers, and writers about their new books. Most of the books covered are non-fiction and published by university or independent scholarly presses. The stated mission of NBN is public education. It is the largest book-focused podcast enterprise in the world, featuring over 130 "organic" author-interview podcasts ("New Books in...") produced in-house and over 100 "hosted" podcasts produced by university presses, academic institutes, and scholars.

The NBN publishes 70 episodes per week and has published over 30,000 episodes as of 2026, all of which are permanently accessible for free on the NBN website. With a reach of 200,000 monthly listeners and about one million downloads month. Listeners come from every country in the world except North Korea. 70% are in the anglophone world and 30% elsewhere. The listenership is highly educated: 90% are college graduates and 53% have advanced degrees. The network was founded by Marshall Poe and is staffed by a small editorial team.

The NBN's interviews are conducted by area experts, most of whom are graduate students and professors, who work for the NBN pro bono. This model results in NBN having a cost per episode of well under $100. The NBN operates under a viewpoint-neutral editorial policy, meaning it does not endorse the content of the books featured; rather, it provides a platform for authors to present their work to the public. The network maintains partnerships with 40 university presses and 20 scholarly institutes. American sociologist Laura Stark has characterized the network as 'a monumental success of slow accretion.'

== History ==
NBN originated in 2007 when Poe, then a history professor who had taught at Harvard University and the University of Iowa, launched a podcast called New Books in History. Poe was then researching a book on the history of communication. During this research he came to the conclusion that people strongly prefer listening (audio) and watching (video) to reading (text). Poe noted that most people do not read serious books precisesly because they have to be read. All the rich content in serious non-fiction books was, as he often said, "trapped in text." Poe wanted to liberate this content by using new media. He therefore decided to experiment with audio and video as a means of communicating scholarly content to the public, the initial result being the podcast New Books in History. It turned out there was significant demand for author interviews with scholars. Listenership exploded and the NBN project began to grow rapidly. In 2012, Poe resigned his tenured professorship to operate the NBN full-time.

== Editorial policy, operations, and business model ==
NBN maintains a strict policy of editorial non-intervention in book selection: hosts choose which books to cover without input from NBN editors. The primary rule on the NBN, Poe has said, is "the hosts pick the books." The network explicitly avoids 'gotcha' journalism. If guests misspeak or request content removal, the network accommodates those requests. Poe has stated that the intent is for authors to 'say exactly what they want to say' and nothing else.

After selecting a book to cover and arranging the interview, NBN hosts record the raw interviews and send the audio files to the NBN for post-production, publication and promotion, The NBN provides training materials to new hosts, most of whom (being graduate students and professors) will know little about conducting and recording an interview. Hosts are encouraged not to editorialize and to remain in the background and they are to allow the guests to speak expansively about their books.

The network generates revenue primarily through direct and programmatic advertising and partnerships with academic institutes and university presses institutes such as Princeton University Press, Oxford University Press, and the MIT Press. In April 2026 NBN published its 30,000th podcast, stating that this made it "one of the largest podcast networks in the world".

== Reception and use in education ==
The network's podcasts are widely used as a pedagogical tool in higher education. In 2014, sociologist Laura Stark assigned students in her undergraduate seminar 'Medicine on Trial' at Vanderbilt University to conduct group author interviews for the network's "New Books in Medicine" channel. Stark described the assignment as an example of what Poe calls 'consequential assignments': work that 'reaches and teaches people' rather than being read by a single instructor and discarded. Writing in the journal Contexts in 2015, Stark argued that the network demonstrated how books and new media need not be opposing forces. She observed that the network 'did not replace books but promoted them and encouraged reading. It did not thin the content of books, but focused it.' Stark suggested that the network pointed toward a future in which academic book culture 'may involve different kinds of reading and more conversations about any given book—an updated oral tradition, new-fangled for a digital age.'
