= Marshall Poe =

American historian (born 1961)

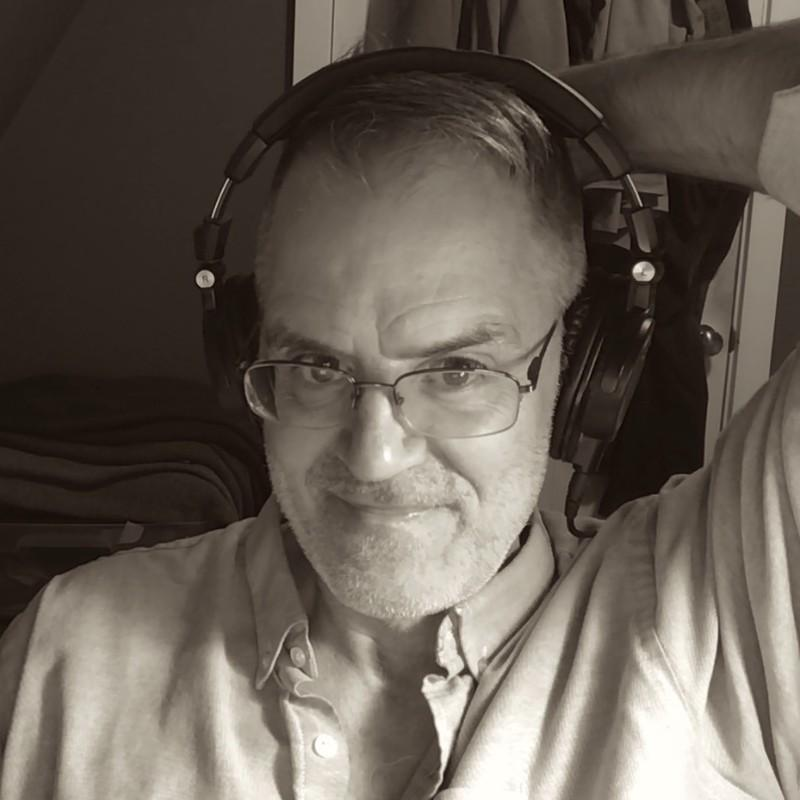
- Poe in 2016
- Born: Marshall Tillbrook Poe; December 29, 1961 (age 64); Huntsville, Alabama, U.S.
- Occupations: Writer, history professor
- Known for: Books on Russian history, Communications theories, Commentary on Wikipedia

Marshall Tillbrook Poe (born December 29, 1961) is an American historian, writer, editor and founder of the New Books Network, an online collection of podcast interviews with a wide range of non-fiction authors. He has taught Russian, European, Eurasian and World history at various universities including Harvard, Columbia, University of Iowa, and the University of Massachusetts Amherst. He has also taught courses on new media and online collaboration.

Poe is the author or editor of a number of books on early modern Russia. He has also published A History of Communications: Media and Society from the Evolution of Speech to the Internet, a book that examines how various communications media shape social practices and values.

In 2005, Poe founded the now-defunct MemoryArchive, a universal wiki-type archive of contemporary memoirs. It encouraged people to contribute written accounts of their personal memories that would be part of a searchable, online database. There he contributed numerous personal accounts of his own, from playing basketball with Barack Obama, to stumbling onto a crime scene of Dennis Rader's, the BTK serial killer.

In 2006, Poe wrote an influential commentary on Wikipedia, the online encyclopedia, while serving as a writer, researcher and editor at The Atlantic magazine.

== Education and academic career ==
Marshall Poe was born in Huntsville, Alabama, on December 29, 1961. His early schooling was hampered by what he has called "pretty severe dyslexia". As a result, he did not learn to read until the second or third grade in primary school.

Poe graduated from Wichita Southeast High School in 1980 and earned his B.A. in 1984 at Grinnell College where he was named outstanding student in history. He earned his M.A. from the University of California, Berkeley, in 1986 and his Ph.D in history at Berkeley in 1992.

He taught at Harvard University from 1989 to 1996 and again from 1999 to 2002, during which time he was appointed Allston Burr Senior Tutor at Harvard's Lowell House where he managed a college of 600 undergraduate students and 50 tutors and staff. He also taught at New York University (1999), American University (2005), the University of Iowa (2007–2013) and the University of Massachusetts Amherst (2013–2014).

He has held fellowships at the Davis Center for Russian Studies at Harvard; the Institute for Advanced Study in Princeton, New Jersey; and the Harriman Institute for Russian Studies at Columbia University.

At the Institute for Advanced Study, Poe played guitar and sang in a loud rock and roll band called "Do Not Erase," consisting entirely of fellows at the institute. The name of the band is taken from what mathematicians write under their long theorems and proofs on chalk boards, so that janitors won't erase them, especially if their equations have discovered something new.

== Writing ==
Marshall Poe's writing ranges from academic articles and books to magazine and Internet pieces intended for wider audiences. He has written extensively on Russian history as well on communications, the Internet and Wikipedia.

=== Russian history ===
Poe is the co-founder and a former editor of the academic journal Kritika: Explorations in Russian and Eurasian History. He is the author or editor of several books on Russia including A People Born to Slavery: Russia in Early Modern European Ethnography (2000) and The Russian Elite in the Seventeenth Century (2004). The Russian Moment in World History (2006) is a brief, 116 page book that was written for the general public. It provides an overview of more than 1,400 years of Russian history beginning in the 6th to 9th centuries with the migration of Slavs from central Europe to the northeast. It ends with the collapse of the Soviet Union in 1991.

Poe argues the Soviet Union did not collapse because of the failure of Communism as many pundits assert. Rather, he contends that the Communist Party lost faith in the traditional path that had not only preserved Russian independence for almost five centuries, but had also enabled the country to build a huge empire. That path included a reliance on autocratic leadership, a command economy, tight controls on debate in the public sphere and a state-engineered military. "Using these means," Poe writes, "the Russian elite was able to take a primitive, premodern state and transform it in the course of two centuries into one of the most powerful enterprises on earth. It is difficult to see how such a thing could be seen as a failure."

Poe's work on Russian history has brought back from obscurity the writings of the 16th-century Austrian diplomat Sigismund von Herberstein, who was one of the first European ethnographers of Russia.

=== The Atlantic ===
From 2003 to 2005, Poe conducted research for The Atlantic magazine and co-wrote the regular feature "Primary Sources.". A typical one, in the magazine's July/August 2005 edition, provided information on a variety of studies and reports supported by online links. For example, it included a study by the U.S. National Academy of Sciences warning about the security risks posed by pools of spent fuel from nuclear power plants; a report from a Brussels-based think tank noting that in spite of fears expressed by U.S. officials, Iran did not appear to be much of a threat to Iraq and a report from the Pew Hispanic Centre showing that increased security measures since 9/11 had not stopped the flow of illegal immigrants into the U.S.

Poe has also written a number of articles for The Atlantic including "Life on Mars" (2004); "How to Beat a Drug Test" (2005); and "Colleges Should Teach Religion to Their Students" (2014).

=== Wikipedia: Common Knowledge ===
Poe became known for his commentary on Wikipedia following the publication of his article "The Hive" in The Atlantic. With Wikipedia "taking off" in 2005, he thought its history could be interesting, so he wrote the piece "on spec". His gamble paid off when the editors published it in the summer of 2006.

Wikipedia has the potential to be the greatest effort in collaborative knowledge gathering the world has ever known.

– Marshall Poe.

Poe's article traces the history of how the co-founders of Wikipedia, Jimmy Wales and Larry Sanger, gradually moved from their original idea for an online encyclopedia called Nupedia, written and edited by experts, to one in which any online user could contribute. He concludes that Wikipedia's "communal regime" permitted rapid growth as well as organization and improvement. "The result of this difference is there for all to see," he writes, "much of the Internet is a chaotic mess and therefore useless, whereas Wikipedia is well ordered and hence very useful."

Poe's position on Wikipedia is that it's not an encyclopedia that imparts expert knowledge, but a repository of common knowledge. During an interview with Andrew Keen, he argued that through a collaborative group, great things can be accomplished. "Wikipedia is in a sense kind of public utility now. It's much more like the electric company or the water company or the public library than it is anything else and there's no reason it shouldn't exist and continue to expand alongside all kinds of other commercial ventures because it is basically built for free. I mean it's just — it's a utility that is provided to the public at almost no public cost."

=== Communications: Pull and Push ===
In 2011, Poe published A History of Communications: Media and Society from the Evolution of Speech to the Internet, a 337-page book that analyzes how media networks originate, how they function and how they shape social practices and values. Poe explains in the book's introduction that he is seeking to expand and refine the communications theories of the late Canadian scholar Harold Innis. In his 1950 book Empire and Communications, Innis conducted a sweeping historical survey of how various media influenced the rise and fall of empires from ancient to modern times.

Poe advances the idea that new media are developed by inventors and tinkerers, but are not "pulled" into broad use until "organized interests" recognize their need for these new communications tools. He argues, for example, that audiovisual media such as radio, telephone, television and film were developed well before they were taken up by industrial capitalists who needed more effective ways to market the goods they produced. Audiovisual media also served the interests of bureaucrats and politicians who gained popularity by giving citizens access to modern conveniences. "Modern states are welfare states," Poe writes, "and welfare states make sure their citizens have things to listen to and watch."

In turn, audiovisual media shaped social practices and values. They "pushed" societies into a hedonistic pursuit of private entertainment justified by people's need for relaxation in an otherwise stressful society. And, since evolutionary psychology suggests that human beings find it easier to listen and watch than to read and write, audiovisual media caught on rapidly. "When faced with reading a good book," Poe writes, "or watching an awful TV show, most people will watch the awful TV show."

Poe writes about five periods in media history: the age of speech, the age of manuscripts, the age of print, the age of audiovisual media and the age of the Internet. He provides a detailed analysis of each under eight headings: accessibility, privacy, fidelity, volume, velocity, range, persistence and searchability. Poe writes, for example, that in the 150,000 years during which speech was the only medium or network, its accessibility was high because nearly everyone could speak and listen. Privacy, however, was low in such face-to-face communication and so too was fidelity because speech can convey only sounds, not pictures or other direct sensory information. Volume and range were also low because the unaided human voice can't carry very far or to many people, but velocity was high because speech travels at the speed of sound. Poe notes that speech is not a persistent medium because it fades away instantly, but it is searchable because what is said can remain in people's memories. He draws many conclusions from this analysis including his theory that societies dominated by speech tended to be democratized and egalitarian, but also distrustful of strangers because as a medium, speech is suited to small, tightly knit groups.

=== New publishing model ===
In his 2002 essay "Note to Self: Print Monograph Dead; Invent New Publishing Model," published in the Journal of Electronic Publishing, Poe questioned the viability of the old academic publishing model, arguing in favor of self-publishing and print on demand. He explained how he did this with one of the two volumes of his prosopographical study of the Russian elite in the early modern period. "Shortly after I sent the book for review", he writes, "a very worried journal editor contacted me. He was upset that I hadn't included a copyright page on the e-book I sent him. Without a copyright page, he explained, any reader could copy my book, send it all over the world, or use it in the classroom — all without my permission. That, I responded, was the point. (I'm not sure he got it.)"

=== Work on the My Lai Massacre ===
In 2023, Poe published The Reality of the My Lai Massacre and the Myth of the Vietnam War (Cambria Press). Poe explained that he wrote the book because his uncle had fought in the Vietnam War and he wondered how a thing such as the My Lai Massacre could happen. The book is based on an exhaustive analysis of 18,000 pages of perpetrator testimony and 5,000 pages of official documents. Poe noted that the My Lai operation is probably the best documented small unit action in the history of warfare.

In the first half of the book, Poe presents a new theory concerning the origins of the massacre. Poe rejects the common thesis that the US troops “ran amok” on March 16, 1968. The massacre, Poe writes, was not the result of combat-induced insanity, a desire for revenge, or any sort of “blood lust.” Rather, it was chiefly the result of orders given by the officers who designed and ran the May 16 operation. Unlike other accounts that place Captain Ernst Medina and Second Lieutenant William Calley at the center of the story, Poe argues that Lieutenant Colonel Frank A. Barker was primarily responsible for the massacre. Barker was leader of “Task Force Barker” and Medina's commanding officer. According to Poe, voluminous testimony from many sources demonstrate that Barker told Medina (wrongly) that My Lai was a VC stronghold and that no civilians would be in the village at the time of the assault. He therefore ordered Medina to destroy the village and kill everyone in it. Interestingly, Medina's troops did not fulfill this order completely. They assaulted the village and killed many civilians, but soon realized that there were no VC and numerous civilians in My Lai. Many soldiers refused to continue firing once this was clear. After the attack was halted, Calley inexplicably ordered two groups of Vietnamese villagers executed.

In the second half of the book, Poe explores the origins of the now common notion that the war had psychologically damaged the perpetrators, and this is why they committed the atrocity. He traces this idea to the work of a group of anti-war psychologists, chief among them Robert Jay Lifton. Lifton interviewed at least one perpetrator of the My Lai massacre and elaborated a theory according to which the particular character of combat in Vietnam drove soldiers to a kind of madness. He called this damaged condition “Vietnam War Syndrome.” He later led the successful drive to have “Vietnam War Syndrome,” generalized, included in the DSM as “Post Traumatic Stress Disorder” (PTSD). Lifton's work entered popular culture in the 1970s in the form of the stereotype of the “crazy Vietnam vet.” It is found in numerous books and films. For example, Travis Bickle, the clearly insane, homicidal protagonist of Martin Scorsese's film “Taxi Driver” (1976) is presented as a Vietnam veteran.

== New Books Network ==
Marshall founded New Books in History in 2007, and the New Books Network in 2011; in 2014 resigning his tenured professorship to work on it full time. The network describes itself as "a consortium of podcasts dedicated to raising the level of public discourse by introducing serious authors to serious audiences." At first, Poe himself interviewed the authors of new non-fiction books for the website that was then called New Books in History. At the beginning of 2020, NBN had 104 channels, publishing 60 interviews a week, with over a million downloads a month. In December 2021 NBN podcasts were downloaded 4.77 million times. Listennotes rank NBN in the top 1% of podcasts worldwide. NBN had published more than 9,500 interviews by the end of 2020. devoted to new books on subjects ranging from African-American studies and economics to philosophy and sports. Poe invites volunteers who are knowledgeable about a subject to conduct "radio interviews" with authors of new books in that subject area. "It's premised on the idea that while most people won't read serious books, they might listen to the authors of those books talk about the ideas in them," Poe told an interviewer. "Reading is hard and inconvenient; listening is easy and convenient. We interview authors with new books, make 'radio shows' out of them, and distribute them on the web as podcasts." In August, 2020, the NBN closed a seed funding round with a group of international investors." In October 2020 NBN starting producing a podcast series in partnership with Princeton University Press called the Princeton University Press Ideas Podcast. In 2021 NBN started a series with Oxford University Press called In Conversation: An OUP Podcast., and launched in Spanish. In 2022 The New Books Network announced that was going to start paying its hosts, and engaged former BBC World Service journalist Owen Bennett-Jones to produce a series called "The Future of". In 2022 NBN started a series with Cambridge University Press called Exchanges: A Cambridge UP Podcast, and a partnership with Columbia University Press called "Off the Page". In August 2022 NBN published its 15,000th podcast, stating that this made it "one of the largest podcast networks in the world". On the 3rd January 2023 the NBN informed hosts that the network had 17500 podcasts published, 4000 in 2022 alone. In 2023 the NBN started co-operation with MIT Press. A new website was launched February 2024 with listener account features, also showing the number of podcasts published on the home page. In November 2024, the NBN announced it had published 25,000 interviews. As of March 2025, The Princeton University Press Ideas Podcast and In Conversation: An OUP Podcast are both hosted by editor Caleb Zakarin.

== Selected bibliography ==
- "Russian despotism" : the origins and dissemination of an early modern commonplace. Thesis (Ph.D. in history). University of California, Berkeley, 1993.
- Foreign descriptions of Muscovy: an analytic bibliography of primary and secondary sources. Columbus, Ohio: Slavica, 1995
- A people born to slavery: Russia in early modern European ethnography, 1476–1748. Ithaca, NY: Cornell University Press, 2000
- (Ed.) The military and society in Russia: 1450-1917, edited by Eric Lohr and Marshall Poe. Leiden; Boston, MA: Brill, 2002.
- Marshall Poe (2003). The Russian moment in world history. Princeton University Press. ISBN 0-691-12606-2.
- (Ed.) The resistance debate in Russian and Soviet history, edited by Michael David-Fox, Peter Holquist, Marshall Poe. Bloomington, Ind.: Slavica Publishers, 2003
- (Ed.) Early exploration of Russia, edited by Marshall Poe. New York: Routledge, 2003.
- (Ed.) Modernizing Muscovy: reform and social change in seventeenth-century Russia, edited by Jarmo Kotilaine and Marshall Poe. New York : RoutledgeCurzon, 2004
- The Russian elite in the seventeenth century. Vol. 1, The consular and ceremonial ranks of the Russian "Sovereigns court" 1613–1713. (Suomalaisen tiedeakatemian toimituksia. Sarja Humaniora, 322, ISSN 1239-6982). Helsinki: Academia Scientiarum Fennica, 2004
- The Russian elite in the seventeenth century. Vol. 2, A quantitative analysis of the "Duma ranks" 1613–1713. (Suomalaisen tiedeakatemian toimituksia. Sarja Humaniora, 323) Helsinki: Academia Scientiarum Fennica, 2004. Electronic edition (PDF) available from Harvard University here (alternative link, at Michigan State University library)
- How to Read a History Book: The Hidden History of History (Winchester, UK: Zero Books, 2018).

== See also ==
- Wikipedia Signpost/2011-09-19
