= Vasili Ivanovich Shemyachich =

Russian noble

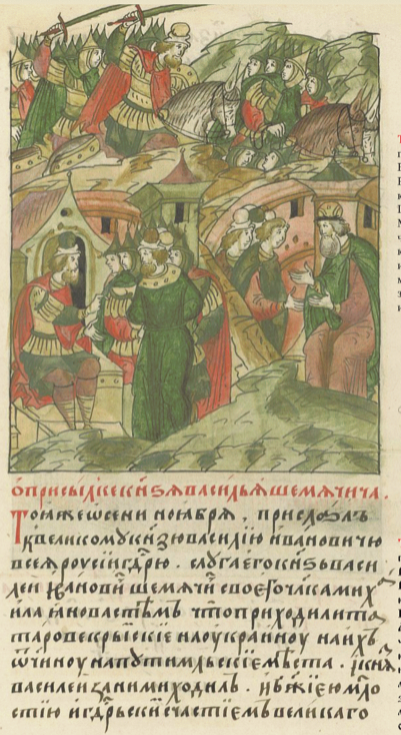

Vasili Ill Ivanovich Rurikid) Russian prince, who was knyaz of Severia (1479–1533) and lord of Putyvl (1500–1523).

== Biography ==
Vasili Ivanovich Shemyachich was a grandson of the famous knyaz of Galich, Dmitry Yurievich Shemyaka. His father, Ivan Dmitrievich, was forced to flee to Lithuania in 1454; the Polish king Casimir IV Jagiellon (who was also the Grand Duke of Lithuania) bestowed him the duchy of Novgorod-Seversky. Novgorod-Seversky was an ancient duchy of Kievan Rus but was annexed to Lithuania for a long time.

Vasili Ivanovich became duke of Novgorod-Seversky after his father's death. When there were some anti-Eastern Orthodox inklings appeared in Lithuania, Vasili Ivanovich went back to Russia in 1500. He was accepted by Ivan III of Moscow as a vassal, and his feud, Novgorod-Seversky fell in control of Moscow. Ivan III also gave him a new feud, Putyvl, a very small duchy in Ukraine. After that, Vasili Ivanovich had fought against Poland-Lithuania sometimes for Grand Duchy of Moscow, and had been involved in a struggle with Crimean Khanate.

There were some princes around the Grand Duke hated Vasili Ivanovich, especially Vasili Semenovich of Mozhaysk. In 1523, Vasili Ivanovich Shemyachich was indicted for treason. He was called to Moscow, then detained. He died in prison in 1529, most likely by natural causes.

== See also ==
- Glinski rebellion
