= Severia =

Historical region at the boundary of Belarus, Russia and Ukraine

Severia Северщина (in Russian) Севершчына (in Belarusian) Сіверщина (in Ukrainian)
- Сѣверія (in Old East Slavic)
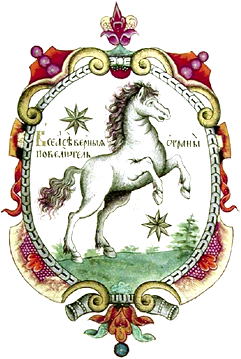
- Coat of arms

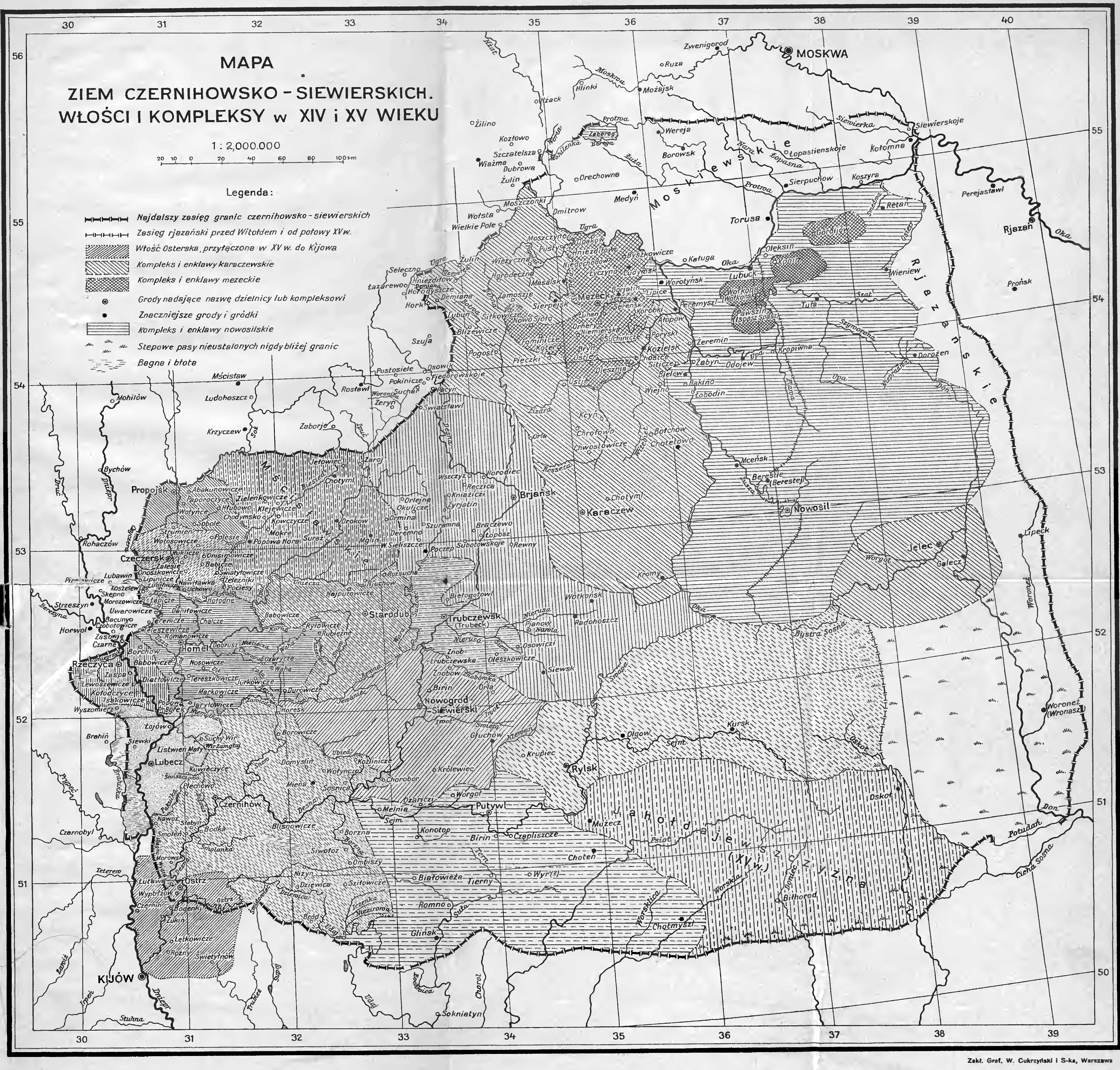
- Country: Russia, Belarus, Ukraine

Demonym
- Official languages: East Slavic

Severia (Old East Slavic: Сѣверія, romanized: Sěverìja, Russian: Северщина, romanized: Severshchina; Belarusian: Севершчына, romanized: Sievierščyna) or Siveria (Ukrainian: Сіверія / Сіверщина, romanized: Siveria / Sivershchyna) is a historical region in present-day southwest Russia, northern Ukraine, and eastern Belarus. The largest part lies in modern Russia, while the central part of the region is the city of Chernihiv in Ukraine.

== Severians ==
The region received its name from the Severians, an East Slavic tribe which inhabited the territory in the late 1st millennium A.D.; their name is Slavic meaning "Northerners". Their main settlements included seven cities of modern Russia (Kursk, Rylsk, Starodub, Trubchevsk, Sevsk, Bryansk, Belgorod) and five cities of modern Ukraine (Liubech, Novhorod-Siverskyi, Chernihiv, Putyvl, Hlukhiv).

According to the Primary Chronicle, the Severians paid tribute to the Khazars, along with the neighboring Polans. Prince Oleg of Novgorod (reigned 879–912) conquered them and incorporated their lands into the new principality of Kievan Rus'. By the time of Yaroslav the Wise (1019–1054) the Severian peoples had lost most of their distinctness, and the areas of Severia along the upper course of the Desna River became controlled by Chernihiv.

In 1096, Oleg I of Chernigov (also referred to as Oleh) created a large Severian Principality, which stretched as far as the upper reaches of the Oka River. Until the end of the century, the principality served as a buffer state against Cuman attacks. Its most celebrated ruler was Prince Igor (1150–1202), whose exploits are recounted in the 12th century epic The Tale of Igor's Campaign.

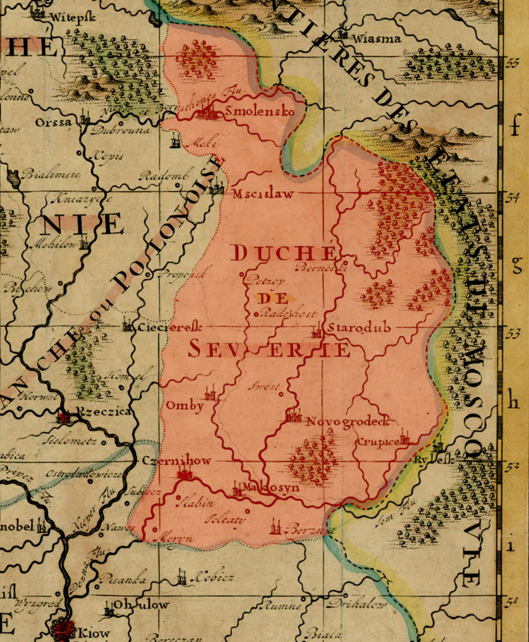
Duchy of Severia as depicted by Henri Chatelain in his map of the Polish-Lithuanian Commonwealth in 1712.

After the Mongol invasion of Rus', the principality became largely ruined; however, it remained intact throughout repeated Tatar invasions. Unfortunately, not much is known about this period as Severia was rarely mentioned in written accounts of the 13th century. By the mid 14th century, it was already part of the Grand Duchy of Lithuania as appanage duchy, whose Gediminid princes (Ruthenian-speaking and Orthodox by religion) established their capitals in the cities of Novhorod-Siverskyi, Starodub, and Trubchevsk. During the 1501-1503 Lithuanian-Muscovite wars, an ally of the Grand Duchy of Lithuania, Khan of Great Horde Sheikh Ahmed destroyed the duchy's capital Novgorod-Siverskyi which by that time was controlled by Muscovites. After the Lithuanian defeat at the Battle of Vedrosha, the Severian Principality was acquired by Muscovy. After the war the duchy was controlled by Muscovite subject Prince Vasiliy Shemiachich (after he was imprisoned in Moscow in 1523, the duchy was governed by Muscovite voivodes (capetanus)).

During the 18th century, the Hetmans of Ukrainian Cossacks established residences in the towns of Baturyn, Hlukhiv, and Pochep. Hlukhiv, in particular, developed into a veritable capital of 18th-century Ukraine.

Following the October Revolution, the Severian lands, populated by a mixture of Ukrainians and Russians, were divided between the Ukrainian and Russian Soviet republics, finally dividing the land of the former Severians.

== Culture ==
Since the 16th and 17th centuries, the specific Severian icon-painting style had been forming. It was much influenced by conservative Byzantine specimens which dominated in the Grand Duchy of Moscow. Severian icons are characterized by internal restraint, severeness and asceticism. These features survived during the Baroque epoch: volume and emotions were almost absent. The collection of Severian icons is preserved in the Museum of Ukrainian home icons of the Radomysl Castle.
