= Sigismund von Herberstein =

Carniolan writer and diplomat (1486–1566)

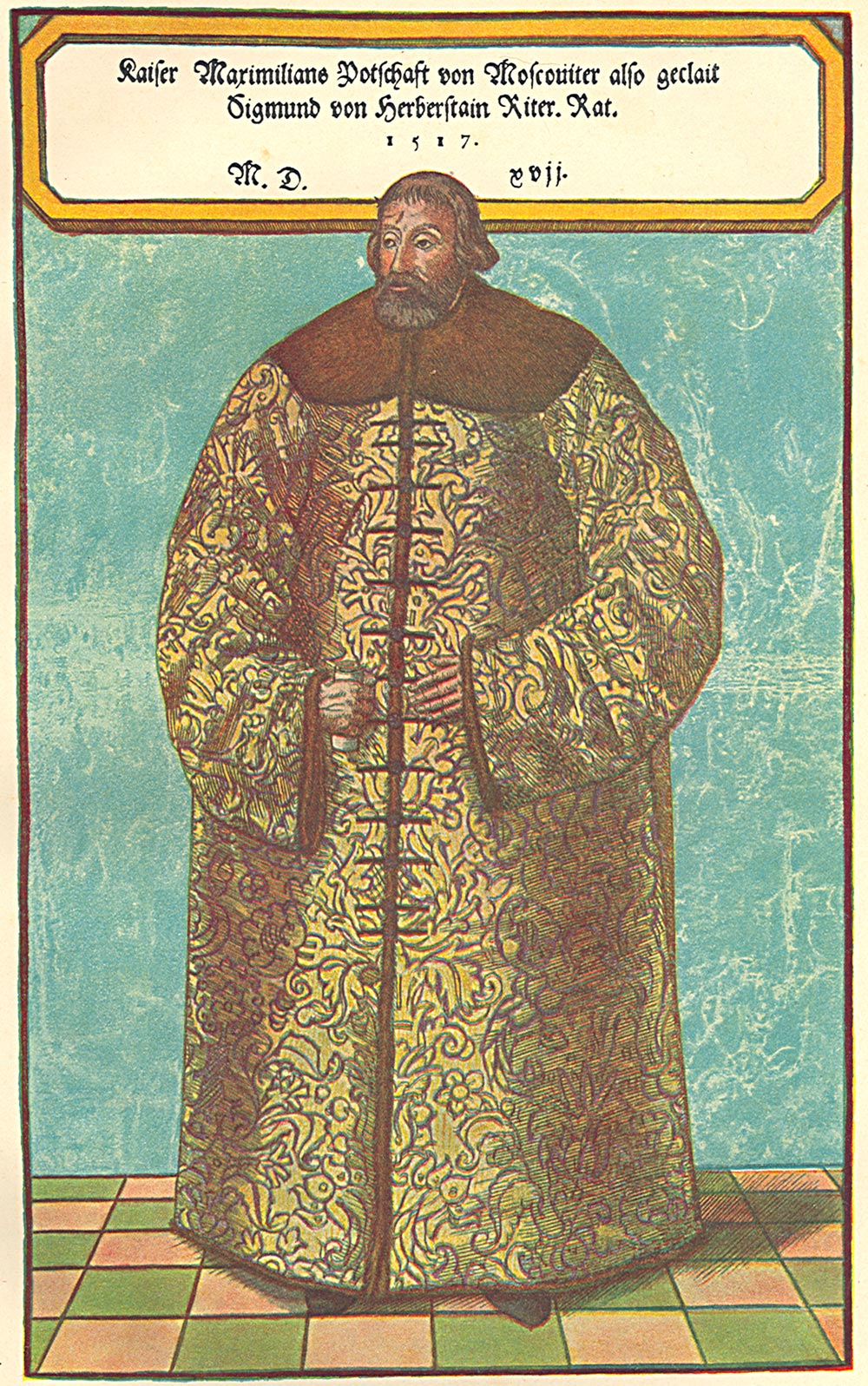
Sigismund von Herberstein in Russian dress, 1517

Siegmund (Sigismund) Freiherr von Herberstein (or Baron Sigismund von Herberstein; 23 August 1486 – 28 March 1566) was a Carniolan diplomat, writer, historian and member of the Holy Roman Empire Imperial Council. He was most noted for his extensive writing on the geography, history and customs of Russia, and contributed greatly to early Western European knowledge of that area.

== Early life ==
Herberstein was born in 1486 in Vipava (German: Wippach) in the Duchy of Carniola, now in Slovenia, then part of the Habsburg monarchy. His parents were Leonhard von Herberstein and Barbara von Lueg, members of the prominent German-speaking family which had already resided in Herberstein Castle for nearly 200 years. Little is known of his early life apart from the fact that he became familiar with the Slovene language spoken in the region. This knowledge became significant later in his life.

In 1499, he entered the University of Vienna to study philosophy and law. In 1506, he entered the army as an officer and served in a number of campaigns. In 1508, he was knighted by the Holy Roman Emperor, Maximilian I, in person. In 1515, he entered the Imperial council, or Parliament, and began a long and illustrious diplomatic career.

== Diplomatic career ==
Between 1515 and 1553, Herberstein carried out approximately 69 missions abroad, travelling throughout much of Europe, including Turkey. He was feted by the ruling Habsburgs and rewarded with titles and estates. He was twice sent to Russia as ambassador of the Holy Roman Emperor, in 1517 to attempt to arrange a truce between Russia and Lithuania, and in 1526 to renew a treaty between the two signed in 1522. These extended visits (nine months in his 1517 visit) provided him with the opportunity to study a hitherto largely unknown Russian society.

== Writing on Russia ==
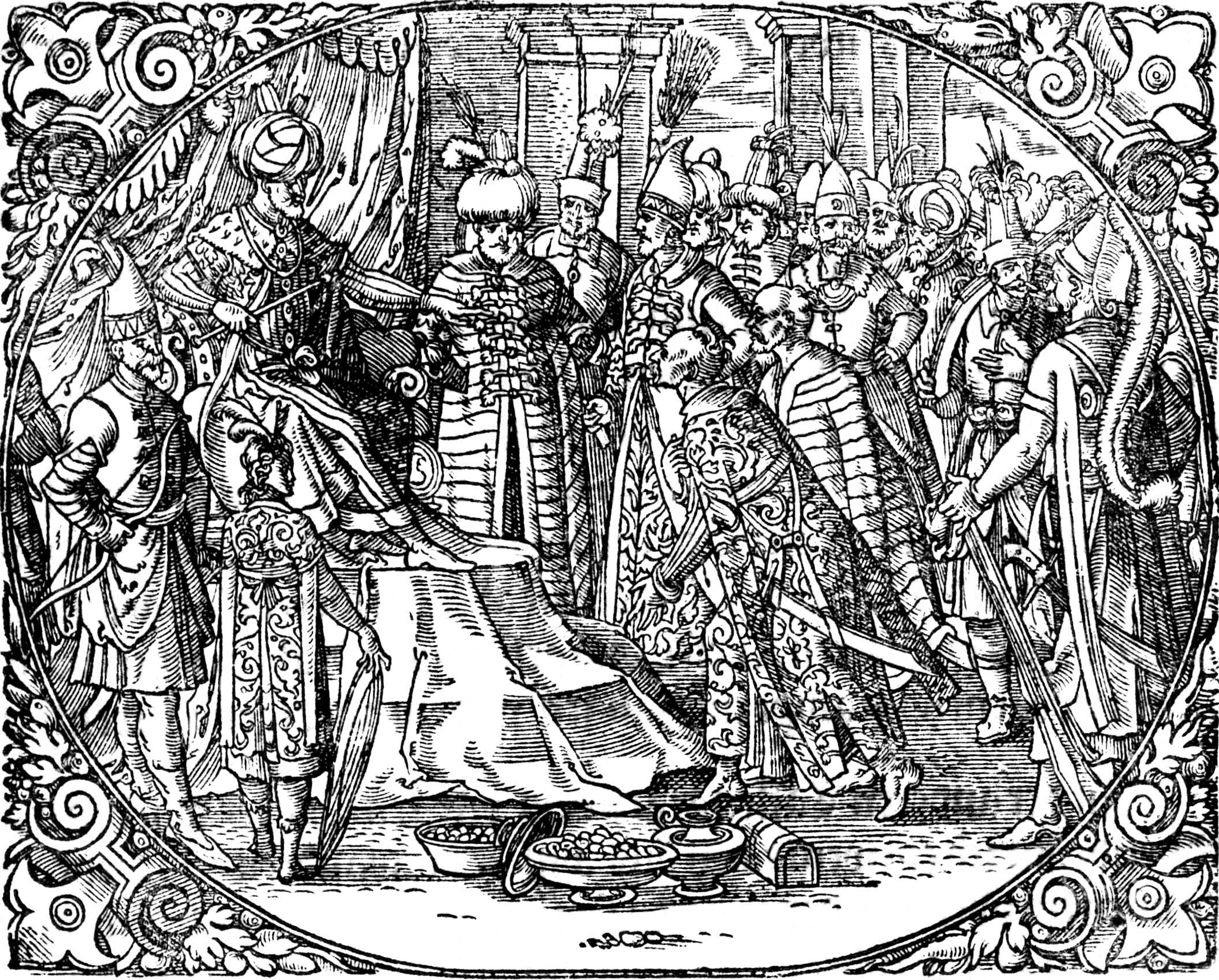
Engraving from Herberstein's book. Ambassadors presenting gifts to the Tsar of Muscovy

Herberstein's knowledge of Slovene, acquired in his youth, allowed him to communicate with Russians, as Slovene and Russian both belong to the Slavic languages. He used this ability to question a variety of people in Russia on a wide range of topics. This gave him an insight into Russia and Russians unavailable to the few previous visitors to Russia.

He probably wrote his first account of life in Russia between 1517 and 1527, but no copy of this survives. In 1526, he was asked to produce a formal report on his experiences in Russia, but this remained relatively unnoticed in the archives until he was able to find time to revise and expand it, which he possibly started in the 1530s.

The evidence suggests that Herberstein was an energetic and capable ethnographer. He investigated in depth both by questioning locals and by critically examining the scarce existing literature on Russia. The result was his major work, a book written in Latin titled Rerum Moscoviticarum Commentarii ("Notes on Muscovite Affairs"), published in 1549. This became the main early source of knowledge in Western Europe on Russia.

He was the first to record the spelling of tsar as czar (both spellings are meant to express the same pronunciation). Later, English and French began to move from the 'cz' spelling to the 'ts' spelling in the 19th century.

Herberstein also referred to a "Russian road guide" that came into his possession for geographical data on the northern Urals and Siberia, which indicated that the territories were well known to the Russians at the time.

== See also ==
- List of foreign observers of Russia

== Sources ==
- "Герберштейн, Сигизмунд" . Brockhaus and Efron Encyclopedic Dictionary (in Russian). 1906.
- Poe, Marshall (2001), A People Born To Slavery: Russia in Early Modern European Ethnography, Cornell University Press, ISBN 978-0801437984.
