= Ella Adayevskaya =

Russian classical pianist

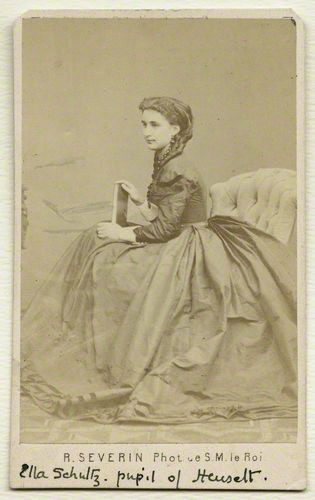
Elisabeth von Schultz (Adayevskaya)

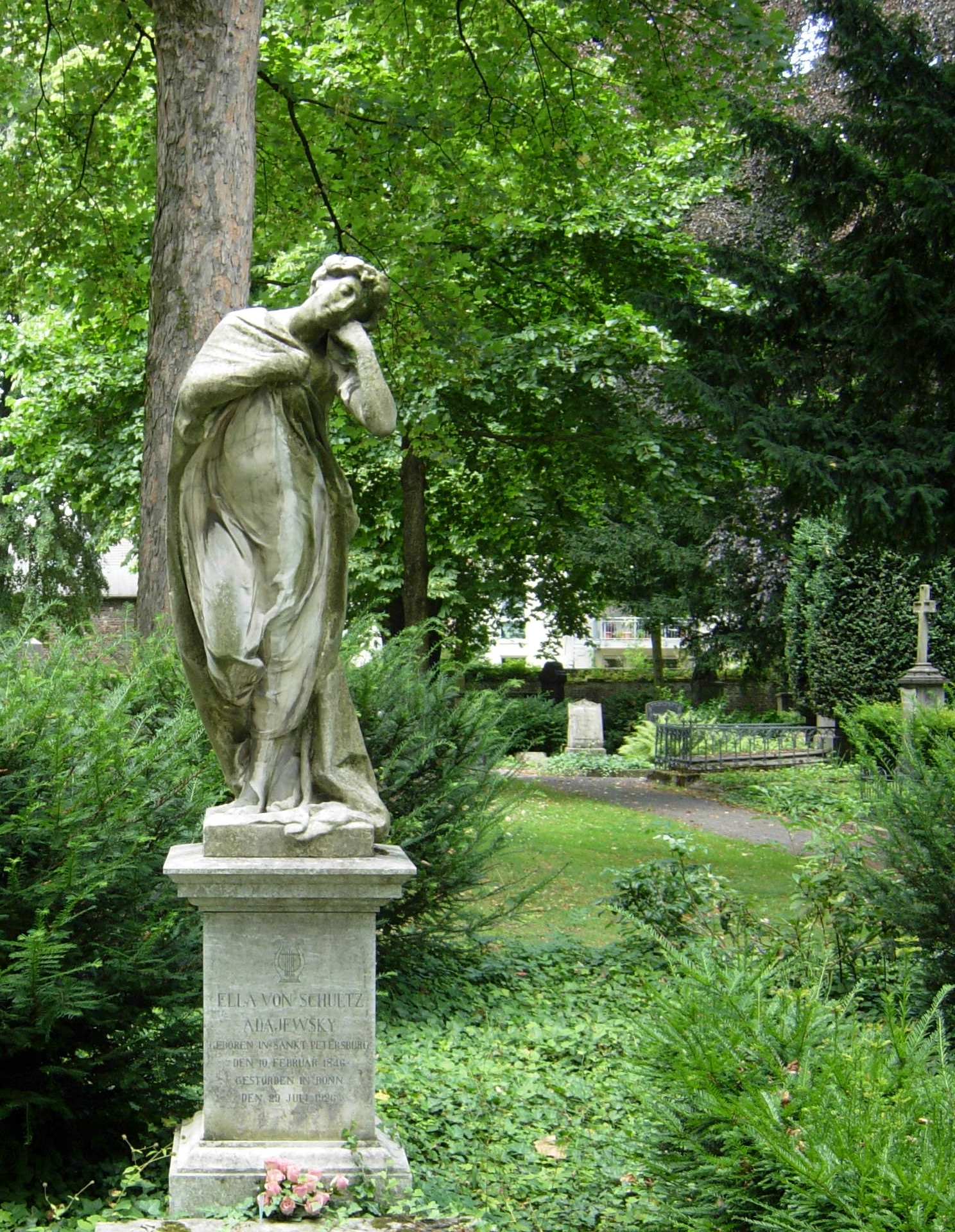
Memorial on Adayevskaya's grave by Antonio Dal Zòtto

Ella von Schultz-Adaïewsky; (Ella Georgiyevna Adayevskaya) Russian: Элла (Елизавета) Георгиевна Адаевская; 22 February 1846 [O.S. 10 February] – 26 July 1926) was a Russian-German composer, pianist, and ethnomusicologist. Note: "Adayevskaya" is an incorrect appellation. Adaïewsky purposely selected a Russian male pseudonym to hide her identity as a female Protestant composer of German descent in Imperial Russia. She explained that she derived the first letters of her artist name (A-D-A) from the opening motif of the overture to Mikhail Glinka's opera Ruslan and Lyudmila.

Adaïewsky wrote vocal music (including choral works), chamber music, and two operas. She also edited a collection of Italian songs and published writings on folk music and the music of ancient Greece.

== Life ==
Born in St. Petersburg on 22 February 1846 as Elizaveta/Elisabeth von Schultz, as the daughter of the prominent Estophile of Baltic German heritage Georg Julius von Schultz. Adaïewsky began learning the piano in childhood. Amongst her teachers were Adolf von Henselt, Anton Rubinstein, and Alexander Dreyschock. She studied composition with Alexander Famintsyn and Nikolai Zaremba. Adayevskaya was a pseudonym derived from the notes A, D, and A, played by the kettledrum in Mikhail Glinka's opera Ruslan and Ludmila.

Her earliest works include choruses written for the Russian Imperial Chapel Choir. In the 1870s, she wrote two operas. The first, titled Neprigozhaya (The Ugly Girl) (in the composer's German manuscript Salomonida, die Tochter des Bojaren, Salomonida, The Boyar's Daughter), was a one-act piece written in 1873. The more ambitious Zarya (Dawn, German title Die Morgenröte der Freiheit (The Dawn of Freedom) ) followed in 1877; this four-act work was dedicated by the composer to Tsar Alexander II, but was rejected by the censor. Later, she embarked on several solo concert tours of Europe and settled in Venice in 1882. In 1881, she composed her Greek Sonata for clarinet or violin and piano. In Italy, she collected national songs, amongst them songs of the people of the Raetia region in quintuple metre.

In 1911, she moved to Neuwied where was associated with the circle of the poet Carmen Sylva and published many articles on folk music.

Adayevskaya died in Bonn in 1926. She was buried in the Alter Friedhof, Bonn.

== Works ==
=== Operas ===
- Neprigozhaya (The Ugly Girl), 1873
- Zarya svobody (The Dawn of Freedom), 1877

=== Vocal music ===
- Yolka (The Fir Tree), cantata, c. 1870; also
- other choral works, songs

=== Chamber music ===
- Greek Sonata for clarinet and piano, 1881
- piano pieces
