= Goštautai =

Lithuanian noble family

Abdank coat of arms

The Goštautai were one of the most influential Lithuanian magnate families of the 15th and early 16th centuries. Their only serious rivals were the Kęsgailos, and from the end of the 15th century the fast rising in power and influence Radvila family clan. It appears from the Latin original spelling of their name Gastoldus which is a variation of castaldius that they had been close to the Grand Dukes and that their function was to oversee ducal demesne. Most power family gained during the reign of Casimir Jagiellon. The castaldius of Vytautas, Andrius Goštautas might have been a voivode of Vilnius and Kreva, and father of Jonas, appears to have been the precursor of the family growth. The majority of the family's possessions (lands) were in the western part of the Duchy and eastern ethnic Lithuania. After the death of the last scion of the family, Stanislovas Goštautas, the King of Poland and Grand Duke of Lithuania Sigismund II Augustus inherited his possessions as a matter of right, per the law of the Grand Duchy of Lithuania.

== Name ==
The Goštautai family name may be found in numerous renderings: Gasztold, Gasztołd, Gasztołt, Gashtold, Gastoldus, Gastold, Gastołd, Gosztold, Gosztowd, Gosztowt, Gosztowtt, Gochtovtt, Gasztowt, Gaszdtowt, Gasztowtt, Gasthawdus, Gostautas, Goštautas, and Gostout; these are all different renderings of the same distorted pagan given name of Goštautai's ancestor, mentioned in written sources as Johann Gastawd. Upon the baptism he retained his pagan Lithuanian name (which may be reconstructed as *Gāstaŭtas) and passed it on to his descendants; that was a common practice of the rising Lithuanian nobility subsequent to the Christianization of Lithuania. Hence at first such names were used much like patronymics rather than surnames in a modern sense.

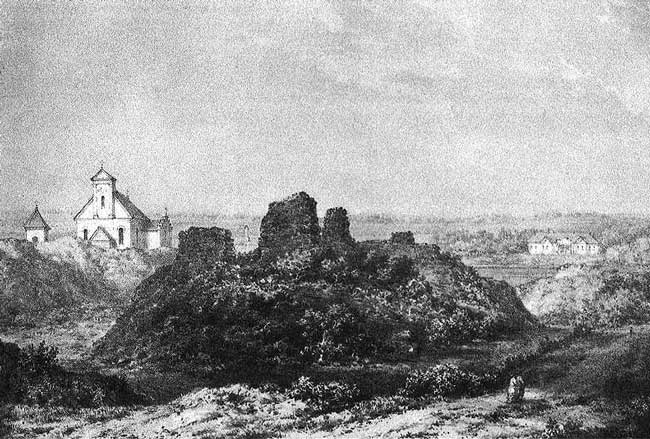
Napoleon Orda's drawing of the ruined Gieraneny Castle of the Goštautai in the modern-day Grodno Region, Belarus.

In Lithuanian the name of the clan is rendered Goštautai or Gostautai (singular, Goštautas or Gostautas); in Polish the forms Gastold or Gasztołd are used. Contemporary written sources use different forms of the name; latest English sources use both forms, Polish Gasztold and Lithuanian Gostautas.

== Notable family members ==
- Jonas Goštautas (1393 or 1408–1458), voivod of Vilnius and Trakai. He led Council of Lords which elected 13-year-old Casimir IV Jagiellon as Grand Duke of Lithuania, and thus for three years abolished the personal union with Poland.
- Martynas Goštautas (1428–1472), Voivode of Kiev and Voivode of Trakai
- Albertas Goštautas (1462–1539), best known member of the family. He was voivod of Vilnius Voivodeship and chancellor of the Grand Duchy of Lithuania. He was one of the initiators and financiers of Lithuanian Statutes.
- Stanislovas Goštautas (1507(?) – 1542) was the last representative of the main family branch
- Jan Gasztowtt (1800–1871), the author of "Pan Sędzic czyli Opowiadanie o Litwie i Żmudzi", participant of the 1831 uprising
- Tytus de Gastold (1809-1862), he participated in the campaign against Russia in 1830 and 1831 and in the battles before Grochów on February 20 and 25, 1831, then before Warsaw on September 6 and 7, 1831. (National Archives, BB 11 380)
- Thadée Gasztowtt (1881-1936), French-born Ottoman, Turkish, and Polish diplomat, revolutionary, historian, and journalist
- Zigmantas Goštautas (1889–1980), cynologist, recreated Lithuanian Hounds
- Carmen Bernos de Gasztold (1919-1995), French nun and author

== Sources ==
- Козлоўскі С. Гаштовта - уладальнікі Ліпнішок. Нарыс гісторыі аднаго роду / Сяргей Козлоўскі // Ліпнішкі – 500 гадоў гісторыі (1510 – 2010 гг.)»: Рэгіянальная навуковая канферэнцыя прысвечаная 500 – годдзю Ліпнішкаўскай парафіі і 400-годдзю надання мястэчку Магдэбурскага права. / пад рэд. А.К. Гецэвіча – Гродна, 2010р. – С. 14-19
