= Albertas Goštautas =

Lithuanian noble (c. 1480 – 1539)

- Grand Chancellor of Lithuania
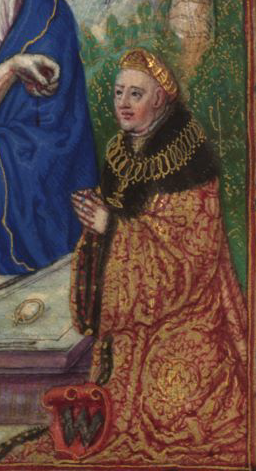
- Coat of arms: Abdank
- Born: c. 1480; Vilnius, Grand Duchy of Lithuania
- Died: December 1539; Vilnius, Grand Duchy of Lithuania
- Noble family: Goštautai
- Spouse: Sofija Verejskaja
- Issue: Stanislovas Goštautas
- Father: Martynas Goštautas
- Mother: NN Galshansky

Albertas Goštautas (Note: Latin: Albertus Gastold(us); Polish: Olbracht (Wojciech) Gasztołd; Belarusian and Ukrainian: Альберт Гаштольд, Альбрэхт Гаштольд.) (c. 1480 – 1539) was a Lithuanian noble of the Goštautai family from the ethnically Lithuanian lands of the Grand Duchy of Lithuania. Voivode of Navahrudak since 1508, Voivode of Polotsk since 1514, Voivode of Trakai since 1519 and Voivode of Vilnius since 1522. In 1522, he became Grand Chancellor of Lithuania. He was the initiator and the editor of the First Statute of Lithuania, as a successor of his staunch opponent Mikolaj Radziwiłł, who rivaled him in the precedence in the Council of Lords. His subsequent rival in influence in the Grand Duchy was Konstanty Ostrogski. In 1529, he received the title of count from Pope Clement VII, and in the following year, thanks to the efforts of Jan Dantyszek, he received the title of Graf of Hyeranyony from Emperor Charles V.

== Life ==
=== Origins and early life ===
Albertas was a son of Martynas Goštautas and an unknown daughter of Semyon Semyonovich Galshansky (also called Trabski). Albertas' father married later Anna Galshansky, daughter of his first wife's uncle Yury Semyonovich Galshansky. Albertas was orphaned at the age of several years and was brought up by his stepmother and maternal grandmother, Maryna Trabska, daughter of Prince Dmitri Semyonovich Drucki in 1490 bequeathed to him her entire estate.

It is likely that Goštautas studied around 1492 at the Jagiellonian University in Kraków, where he mastered Polish and Latin languages perfectly. In 1501, he travelled to the imperial court in Vienna. In the same year, he became a courtier of Grand Duke Alexander. In February 1503, he was appointed governor of Novogrudok, and in that same year, he took part in his first military campaign against the Tatars. In 1505, he was granted the office of cup-bearer.

=== Conflict with Mikołaj Radziwiłł ===
He then allied himself with Jan Zabrzeziński against the influence of Michał Gliński and the Grand Duke Alexander, as a result of which he lost the governorship of Novogrudok in 1506. The following year, after death of Alexander, the new ruler King Sigismund I entrusted him with the defense of Smolensk. After Gliński’s betrayal in 1508, when Gasztołd took up the defense of Vilnius, he was appointed as the first Voivode of Novogrudok. Gasztołd then took part in the war with Moscow and in suppressing Gliński’s rebellion. However, on January 19, 1509, he was arrested on charges of high treason, accused of conspiring with Gliński. Due to efforts by his political opponent, Mikołaj Radziwiłł, his imprisonment was prolonged, and he was only acquitted on May 18, 1511, at the Sejm in Brest, thanks to the intercession of the pope, and of Polish and Lithuanian nobles.

Goštautas accumulated wealth, not only from his family estates and the inheritance from his grandmother, Princess Trabska, but also, through his marriage to Sofia Vereiskaya, he acquired the property of her family. The estates of Gasztołd were scattered throughout the entire state— in proper Lithuania, Volhynia, along the Dnieper— but above all in Podlasie, where the complex of holdings formed almost a separate duchy. According to the 1528 military census, he was one of the largest landowners in Lithuania. After the death of Queen dowager Helena, he received the starostwo of Bielsk, and later that of Mozyr. In 1514, he was appointed Voivode of Polotsk. His conflict with Radziwiłł escalated into an open war of raids, mainly in the Podlasie, where both nobles owned adjoining estates. Goštautas lost the case in the royal court but did not pay the ordered compensation.

He also served as a diplomat. In 1513, together with Aleksander Chodkiewicz, he was sent on a mission to Poland to request aid in the new war with Moscow. In 1515 he was a part of the king's entourage during his travel to Pozsony and Vienna for negotiations with Maximilian I. In 1518, he was supposed to travel to the Crimean Khan with gifts, but the mission did not take place.

In the face of a new Muscovite invasion of Polotsk, Goštautas gathered local forces and, supported by Polish troops under the command of Jan Boratyński, achieved a major victory over the Muscovite army on July 29, 1518. On March 5, 1519, he was granted the voivodeship of Trakai. For the next Muscovite incursion in 1519, Lithuania was completely unprepared, torn apart by the ongoing conflict between Goštautas and Radziwiłł. Radziwiłł burned down the castle in Tykocin, which belonged to Goštautas, allegedly in retaliation for an attempted arson of the Radziwiłł castle in Goniądz by Goštautas. The conflict was finally brought to an end by Radziwiłł’s death, after which Goštautas was appointed Voivode of Vilnius and Grand Chancellor.

=== Conflict with Konstanty Ostrogski ===
Before long, however, Goštautas fell into conflict with a new opponent, Hetman Konstanty Ostrogski, who until then had been his close friend and ally. The core of the dispute was their differing attitudes toward Poland: Goštautas became the leader of the separatist faction, while Ostrogski supported union with Poland. Ostrogski, engaged in battles with the Tatars, was well aware of the importance of Polish assistance, without which the defense of the southern border would have been impossible.

The first act of their rivalry was the matter of proclaiming Sigismund Augustus as heir to the throne of Lithuania, which Goštautas carried out at the Vilnius Sejm on December 4, 1522, in cooperation with Queen Bona. The resistance of Ostrogski, who was reluctant to support this movement knowing it would alienate the Polish nobility—insistent on a joint election of a new ruler for both states—was broken by the king’s grant of the Trakai voivodeship in 1522. This further enraged Goštautas, as according to the Union of Horodło, the office was reserved exclusively for Catholics.

Furthermore, Ostrogski also took under his protection the widow of Radziwiłł, Elżbieta Sakowicz, and her three sons, from whom Goštautas was demanding compensation. The struggle between the two factions paralyzed political life in Lithuania. During the king’s absence, which lasted until 1528, no Sejm was convened, and both magnates held separate assemblies of their supporters. Seeking support but finding none from Queen Bona, Goštautas turned to the Polish nobles who were at odds with her, led by Chancellor Krzysztof Szydłowiecki and bishop Piotr Tomicki, as well as to the Viennese and Prussian courts. He supported Archduke Albert of Habsburg in his border disputes with Bona and also promoted him as a candidate for regent after the king’s death. In 1529, he received a count title from the pope Clement VII and was granted the title of “Graf of Murowane Gieranojny” by Emperor Charles V.

=== Conflict with the royal court ===
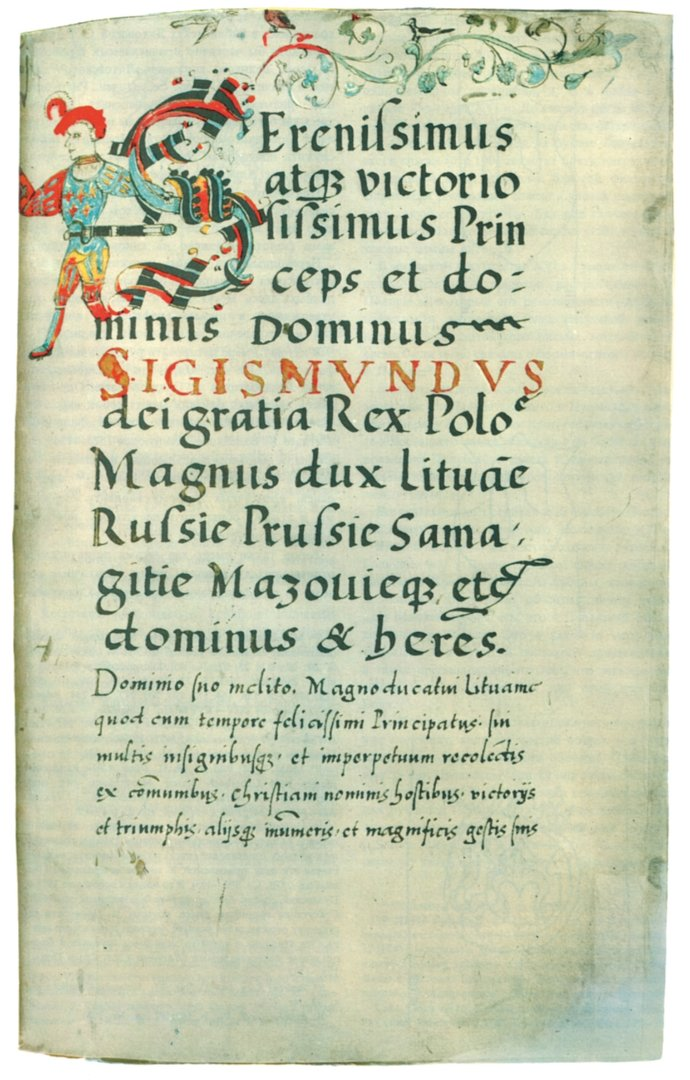
Latin version of the First Statute of Lithuania, circa 1540

It was only the arrival of King Sigismund I in Lithuania that brought an end to the disputes. Bishop Mikołaj Radziwiłł ceded the Knyszyn estates to Sigismund Augustus, and the remaining brothers reached a settlement with Gasztołd, ceding him a number of villages. Soon, both families drew closer in opposition to Queen Bona, who had begun a campaign to bring order to Lithuanian affairs. Through a series of legal proceedings, she reclaimed numerous state-owned estates that had been unlawfully seized by magnates, supported the lesser nobility in their 1528 demand for the introduction of a judiciary modeled on the Polish one, and oversaw the election of her son, Sigismund Augustus, as Grand Duke of Lithuania on October 18, 1529. In 1529, Gasztołd participated in the drafting of the Lithuanian Statute, which reflected his belief in Lithuanian separatism. In 1532, the petty nobility and townspeople of Bielsk voluntarily imposed a tax on themselves and presented funds to the Queen to buy out the starostwo from Gasztołd’s hands.

After the departure of the king and queen from Lithuania, Goštautas, together with Jan and Jerzy Radziwiłł, seized power and attempted to reverse the queen’s decrees. However, their rule was quickly curtailed during the king’s second stay in Lithuania from 1533 to 1536. Before the royal court, Goštautas was forced to relinquish his privileges over Bielsk, Brańsk, Suraż, Narew, and Kleszczele—lands that had been repurchased by the queen.

At the same time, the minor Ivan IV ascended the throne in Moscow. Goštautas used this as a pretext to divert the court’s attention from economic matters and, at the Vilnius Sejm, pushed through a declaration of war against Moscow. The war turned out to be disastrous for Lithuania, revealing the collapse of military organization and lack of preparedness. Nevertheless, it did not halt Queen Bona’s reforms—only delayed them.

Goštautas issued memorials opposing the introduction of the Polish judicial system in Lithuania and the economic reforms being implemented there. In 1538, during a pospolite ruszenie in Novogrudok, together with his son Stanisław, Jerzy and Jan Radziwiłł, and Iwan Sapieha, he allegedly composed, in the name of the entire nobility, a series of grievances against the violation of the rights and privileges of the Grand Duchy. The court ignored this protest.

Shortly thereafter, Goštautas died in 1539. He was buried in the Goštautas Chapel of the Vilnius Cathedral. His tombstone was crafted by the renowned artist Bernardino de Gianotis.

== Cultural activity ==
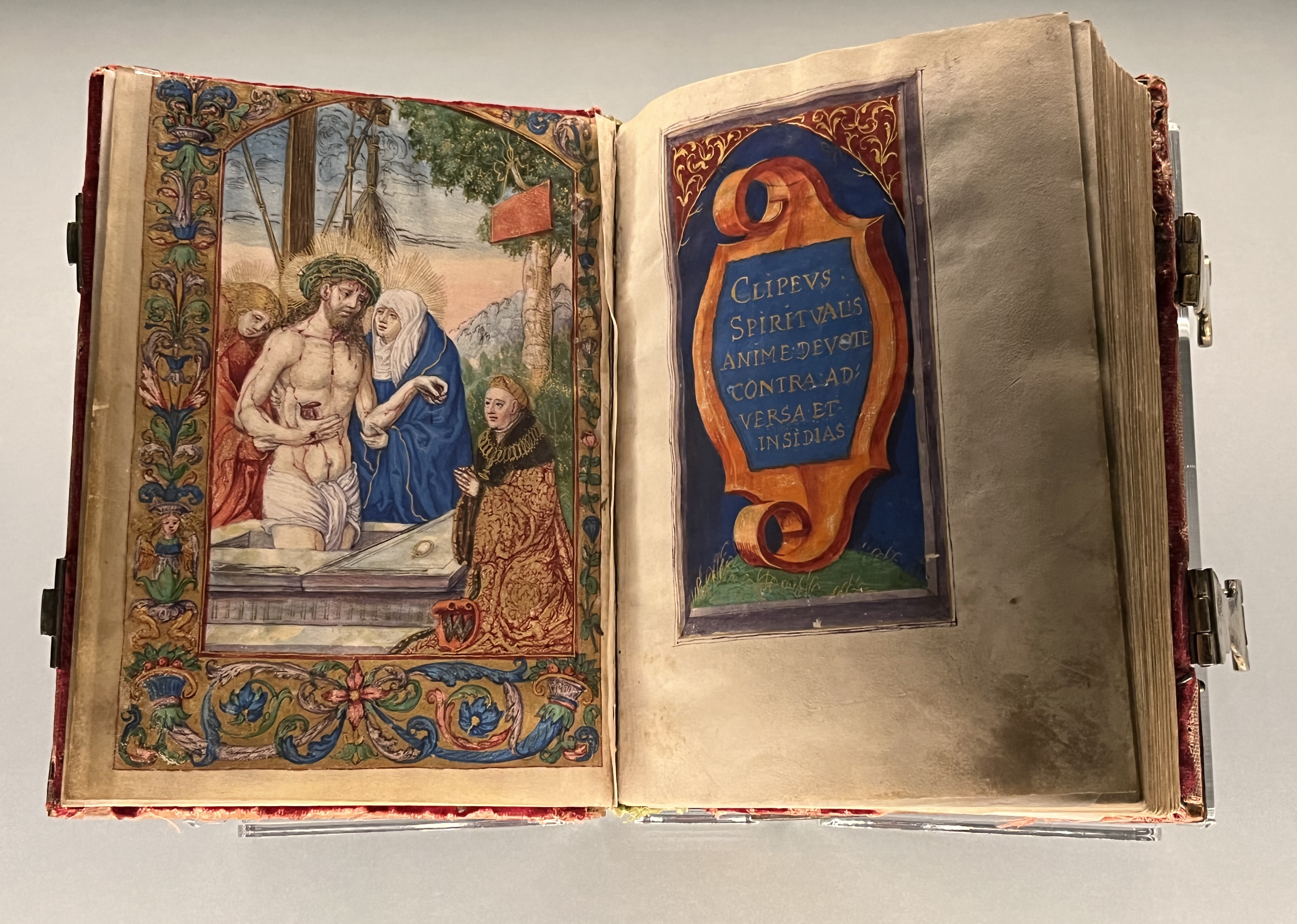
The prayer book of Goštautas, 15th century

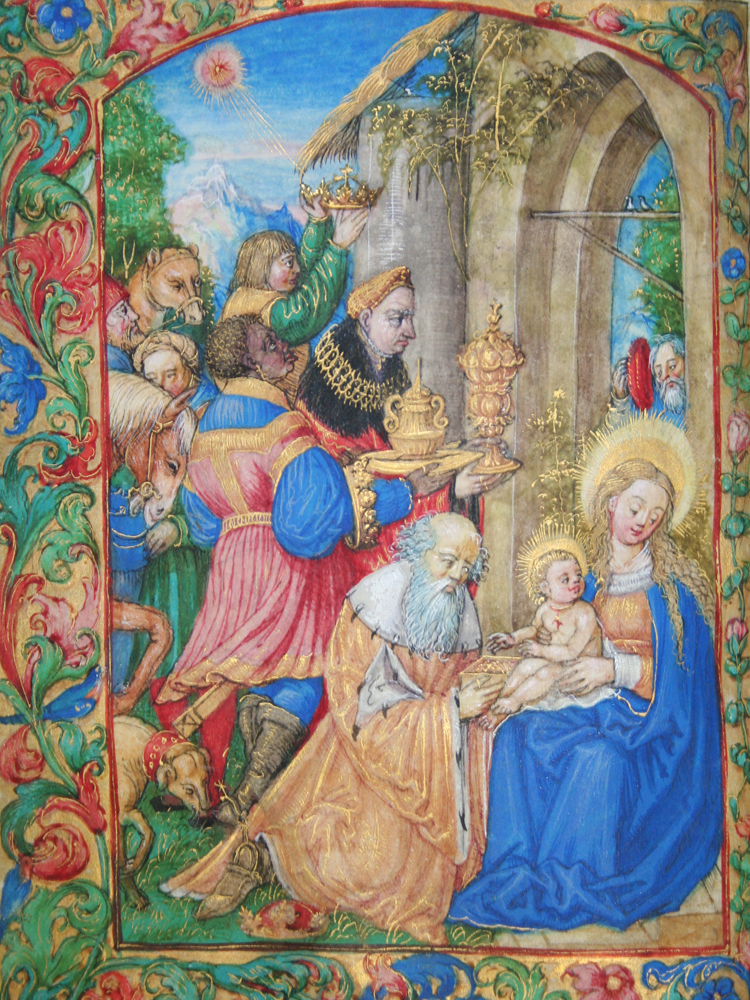
An image from the prayer book of Goštautas, depicting him gifting Eucharistic objects

It is believed Goštautas, as well as the rest of Goštautai family members, had retained their native Lithuanian language. He knew the Polish language perfectly. Influenced by the ideas of the Protestant Reformation, Goštautas was a supporter of the Lithuanian culture and language in state affairs and had a nationalistic attitude: he segregated non-Lithuanian and Polish-speaking Franciscans, took care of the representatives of Lithuanian literature, such as Abraomas Kulvietis, and showed distrust to Ruthenian inhabitants of the Grand Duchy.

In 1528, Goštautas commissioned a prayer book in Polish from the Kraków workshop of Stanisław Samostrzelnik. The manuscript was richly decorated, featuring sixteen full-page miniatures. These depict, in order: Christ standing in the tomb, Saint Jerome, the Annunciation, the Visitation of Elizabeth, the Adoration of the Child, the Annunciation to the Shepherds, the Adoration of the Magi, the Massacre of the Innocents, the Flight into Egypt, the Presentation in the Temple, Saint Adalbert, Saint Nicholas, Saint Anne with the Virgin and Child, Saint Barbara, Saint Catherine, and Saint Christopher. A portrait of Olbracht Goštautas as the donor and owner of the prayer book appears already on the first miniature—kneeling beside Christ’s tomb, with a chain around his neck bearing the chancellor’s seal. On another folio, the initials AG (Adalbertus Gastoldus) are visible next to the Abdank coat of arms.

The manuscript consists of 232 folios written in elegant calligraphic Fraktur and is divided into three sections: Szczyt duszny (The Spiritual Shield, ff. 1–90), Godziny o Pannie Maryjej (Hours of the Virgin Mary, ff. 91–205), and Modlitwy ku wybranym świętym (Prayers to Selected Saints, ff. 207–230). It is one of only four surviving illuminated prayer books by Samostrzelnik, the others having been created for Sigismund I the Old, Queen Bona, and Krzysztof Szydłowiecki. Goštautas’s prayer book is the only one written in Polish. It is preserved today in the University Library in Munich.

Goštautas extended his patronage and protection to many artists and people of culture. From 1523, the Neo-Latin poet Mikołaj Hussowczyk was part of his entourage, having previously been under the patronage of Mikołaj Radziwiłł. In 1537, Goštautas confirmed Hussowczyk's ownership of the villages of "Kroszte" and "Ossowo," the latter of which is likely identical with Gąsówka-Osse, the probable ancestral seat of the Gąsowski/Hussowski family.

He is one of the characters on the famous painting by Jan Matejko, Prussian Homage.

== Family and estate ==
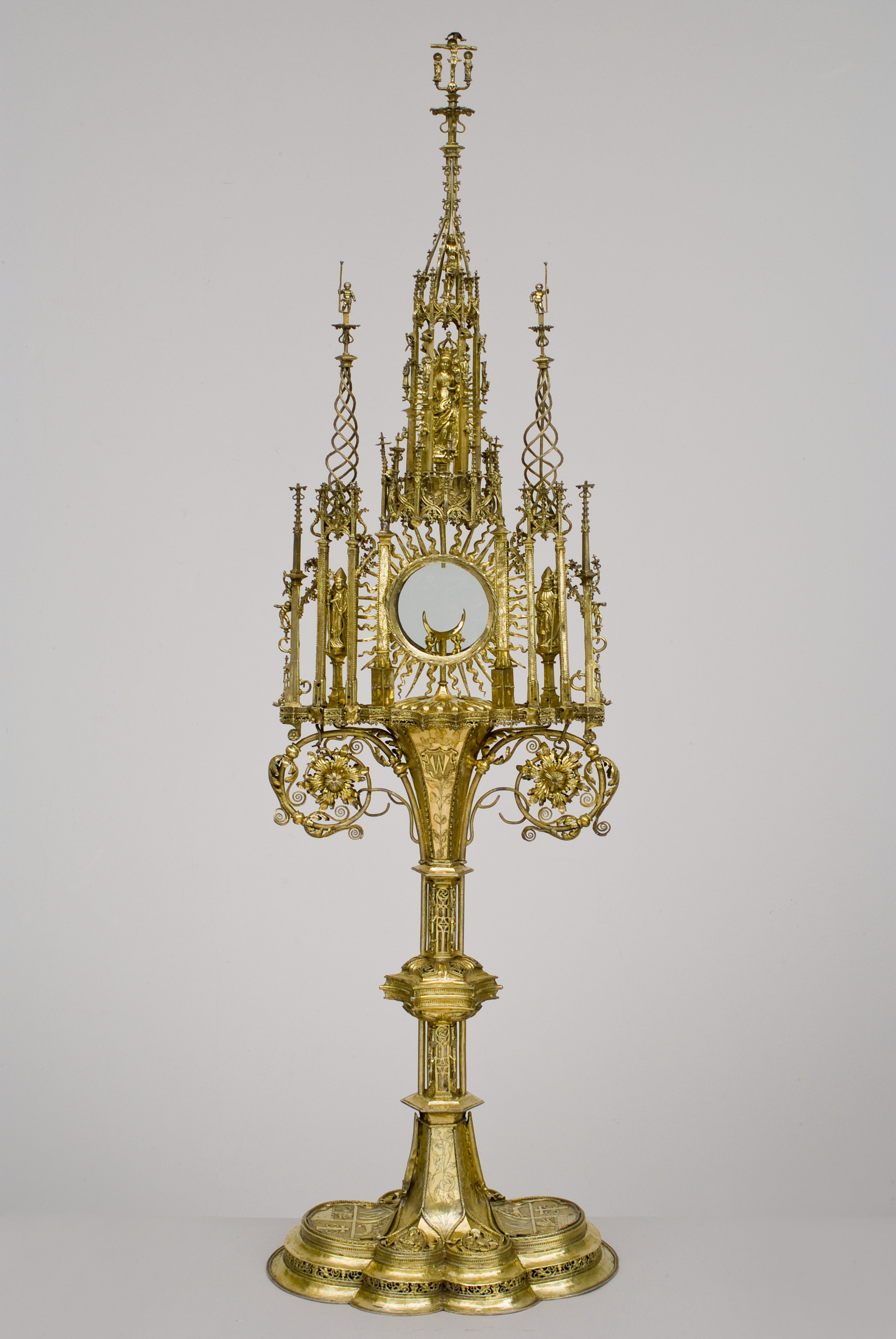
The Great Monstrance of Goštautai, which was gifted by Goštautas with his testament to the Vilnius Cathedral

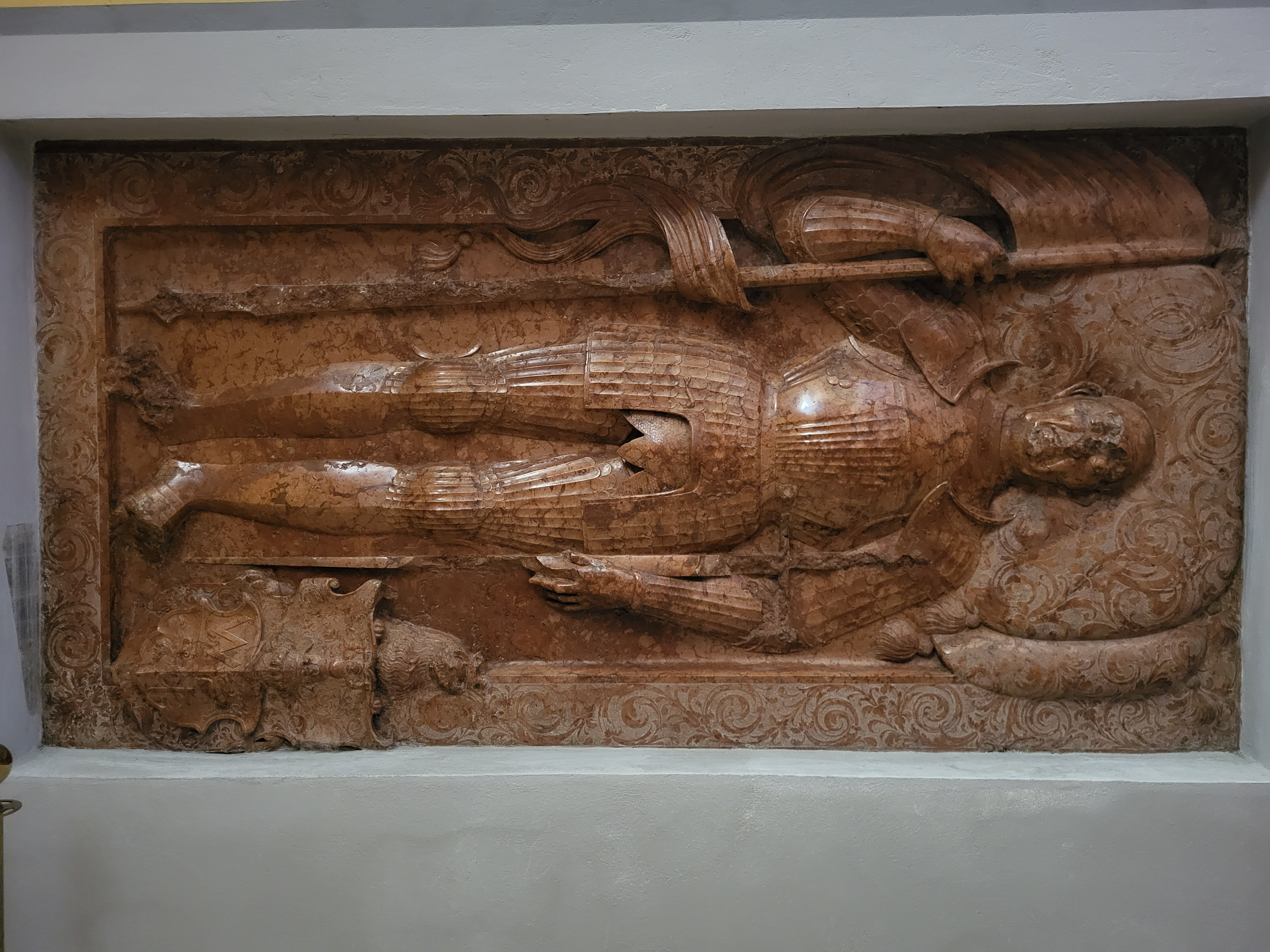
The tombstone of Albertas Goštautas, sculpted by Bernardino de Gianotis, in the Goštautai Chapel of Vilnius Cathedral

Albertas Goštautas married before 1506 Sofia Vereiskaya, daughter of Russian voivode Vasily Mikhailovich Vereisky and Maria Palaiologina. Vasily Vereisky was coming from the Rurikovich family, as the great-grandson of Dmitry Donskoy, Grand Prince of Moscow, grandson of Andrei, Prince of Mozhaysk, and son of Mikhail, Prince of Vereya.

Vasily got into a dispute with Grand Prince Ivan III over the dowry of his wife Maria, daughter of Andreas Palaiologos titular Byzantine Emperor, and niece of Sophia Palaiologina, wife of the Grand Prince. The dispute ended with the loss of the hereditary principality and Vasily's escape with his wife to Lithuania, where, on 2 October 1484, he received the estates of Lubcha, Koidanova, Radashkovichy and Valozhyn from King Casimir IV Jagiellon.

These estates were inherited by Sophia, and she managed them together with her husband, and after his death she held them until her death in August 1549. After her death, the estate passed to King Sigismund II Augustus. The marriage was a significant elevation for Albertas, whose family was not one of the knyaz families. In 1522, King Sigismund I the Old gave Sofia, her husband and offspring the right to seal letters with red wax, which only royal blood persons were entitled to.

Albert Goštautas and Sofia had one son, Stanisław, who was married to Barbara, the daughter of Jerzy Radziwiłł. Stanisław had no children and was the last member of the family.

Goštautas accumulated wealth, not only from his family estates and the inheritance from his grandmother, Princess Trabska, but also, through his marriage to Sofia Vereiskaya, he acquired the property of her family. The estates of Gasztołd were scattered throughout the entire state— in proper Lithuania, Volhynia, along the Dnieper— but above all in Podlasie, where the complex of holdings formed almost a separate duchy. According to the 1528 military census, he was one of the largest landowners in Lithuania. He was able to field 426 cavalrymen, a total of 3408 service uniuts from 6816 hearths he owned.

Goštautas owned 10 castles scattered throughout the territory of the Grand Duchy. The main family seat was Gieranony, located in the Vilnius Voivodeship, known as 'Murowane' (lit. 'bricked') due to the presence of a brick castle. In the same voivodeship was Goštautas’s second brick castle, Rokantiškės, situated near Vilnius. According to legend recorded in the Bychowiec Chronicle, compiled under the patronage of Goštautas, the castle in Rokantiškės was built by the legendary Prince Holsza, the progenitor of the Holszanski princes. It is possible that Goštautas’s mother, whose name is unknown, came from this lineage. The remaining castles were wooden. These included Daugėliškis in the Vilnius Voivodeship, Tykocin in Podlasie, Sidorowo in the Nowogródek Voivodeship, Oster and Liubech in the Kiev Voivodeship, Radashkovichy and Koidanova in the Minsk Voivodeship, and Shklow in the Vitebsk Voivodeship. Castles Liubech, Radashkovichy and Koidanova were acquired through the marriage with Sofia Vereiskaya.

== Bibliography ==
- Bis, Wojciech; Ryčkov, Andrej; Volkau, Mikola (2024). "Zamki litewskiego rodu Gasztołdów w pierwszej połowie XVI wieku" [Castles of the Lithuanian Goštautas Family in the First Half of the 16th Century] (PDF). Kwartalnik Historii Kultury Materialnej. 72 (3).
- Frost, Robert (2015). The Oxford History of Poland-Lithuania. The Making of the Polish-Lithuanian Union, 1385–1569. Oxford: Oxford University Press. ISBN 978-0-19-820869-3.
- Janicki, Marek A. (2020). "Grób i komemoracja wielkiego księcia Aleksandra Witolda w katedrze wileńskiej w kontekście upamiętnienia Władysława Jagiełły w katedrze krakowskiej i propagandy jagiellońskiej XIV–XVI w." [The tomb and commemoration of Grand Duke Alexander Vytautas in Vilnius Cathedral in the context of the commemoration of Władysław Jagiełło in Kraków Cathedral and 14th-16th century Jagiellonian propaganda]. Przegląd Historyczny. 111 (4).
- Maroszek, Józef (2000). Pogranicze Litwy i Korony w planach króla Zygmunta Augusta. Białystok.
- Pociecha, Wojciech (1958). "Olbracht Gasztołd". Polski Słownik Biograficzny (in Polish). Vol. 7. Wrocław. pp. 299–303.
- Wolff, Józef (1895). Kniaziowie litewsko-ruscy od końca czternastego wieku [Lithuanian-Ruthenian knyazes from the end of the fourteenth century] (in Polish). Warsaw.
