= Bialobrzeski =

Bialobrzeski can refer to:

== Places ==
Białobrzegi County, Poland

== Other uses ==
Białobrzeski family, a Polish noble family
