= Martynas Goštautas =

Lithuanian noble (1428 – c. 1483)

Abdank coat of arms

Martynas Goštautas (Polish: Marcin Janowicz Gas(z)tołd or Marcin Gasztołdowicz; Ukrainian: Мартин Ґаштольд (Ґоштовт); 1428, Vilnius – c. 1483, Vilnius) was a nobleman from the Grand Duchy of Lithuania of the Goštautai family. He was the Grand Marshal of Lithuania, Voivode of Navahrudak (1464–1471), first Voivode of Kiev (1471–1475) and Voivode of Trakai (1480–1483). He was a servant to King Casimir IV Jagiellon, and was a founder of Tykocin monastery and the Dominican monastery and church in Trakai.

Martynas was a son of Jonas Goštautas, carrying his first name as a patronymic, and father of Albertas Goštautas. His sister Maria was married to Simeon Olelkovich, Prince of Kiev. Despite this, residents of Kiev resented the appointment of a Roman Catholic as voivode and refused to let him in. As a result, the city had to be taken with force. In exchange, Kiev acquired the status of a voivodeship, equal to that of Trakai and Vilnius and the subsequent voivodes were Orthodox nobles.
