= Jonas Goštautas =

Lithuanian magnate (d. 1458)

- Coat of arms: Abdank
- Born: c. 1393; Vilnius or Geranainys
- Died: 1458; Vilnius
- Family: Gasztołd (Goštautai)
- Consort: Dorota Zadora h. Zadora; Elżbieta
- Father: Andrius Goštautas
- Mother: NN Buczacka h. Abdank

Jonas Gostautas or Goštautas (Belarusian: Ян (Івашка) Гаштольд; Polish: Jan Gasztołd; c. 1393 in Hyeranyony or Vilnius – before 1 September 1458 in Vilnius) was a Lithuanian nobleman from the Grand Duchy of Lithuania of the Gasztołd (Goštautai) noble family, a politician and skillful land owner. He served as Chancellor of Lithuania between 1443 and 1458 and was a very close advisor and mentor to Casimir IV Jagiellon before he became the third Jagiellonian King of Poland.

Gostautas was not his surname, but a pagan Lithuanian given name retained after baptism by his immediate ancestor, while Jonas was his Christian name. His heirs, e.g., his sons like Martynas Goštautas, perhaps inherited the name as a surname. In 1413 at the Union of Horodło, Jonas was adopted by the Polish nobles into the Abdank clan.

== Life ==
First mentioned in 1413, Jonas Goštautas served as a marshal during the late reign of Vytautas the Great. Following death of Vytautas he continued his duties under Švitrigaila and sided with him against Vytautas' brother Sigismund Kęstutaitis. In 1431 while defending Lutsk from the Sigismund Kęstutaitis' Polish-Lithuanian assault he was captured and imprisoned.

When fighting erupted between Švitrigaila and Sigismund Kęstutaitis for Grand Duke title, Jonas Goštautas supported Sigismund Kęstutaitis, who appointed him as governor of Smolensk later on. He served as governor of Smolensk for around four years until 1440 assassination of Grand Duke Sigismund Kęstutaitis forced him to leave this position. Serving many Duchy rulers he managed to gain and hold tremendous wealth and thus he became one of the richest noblemen of Lithuania.

The death of Sigismund Kęstutaitis left empty the throne of the Grand Duchy of Lithuania and Jonas Goštautas, as well as other noblemen of the Council of Lords supported Casimir Jagiellon as a candidate for the throne. Polish magnates hoped and insisted that thirteen-year-old boy remained only a vicegerent of Wladyslaw III, the Polish King and his brother, in Lithuania. But when Polish delegation bringing Casimir arrived in Vilnius in 1440 he was proclaimed as Grand Duke by the Council of Lords, contrary to the wishes of the Polish politicians—an act supported and coordinated by Jonas Goštautas. In this way fragile personal union between Grad Duchy of Lithuania and Kingdom of Poland was dissolved. The news in Kingdom of Poland about proclamation of Casimir as Grand Duke was met with hostility towards Lithuania, even to the point of military threats.

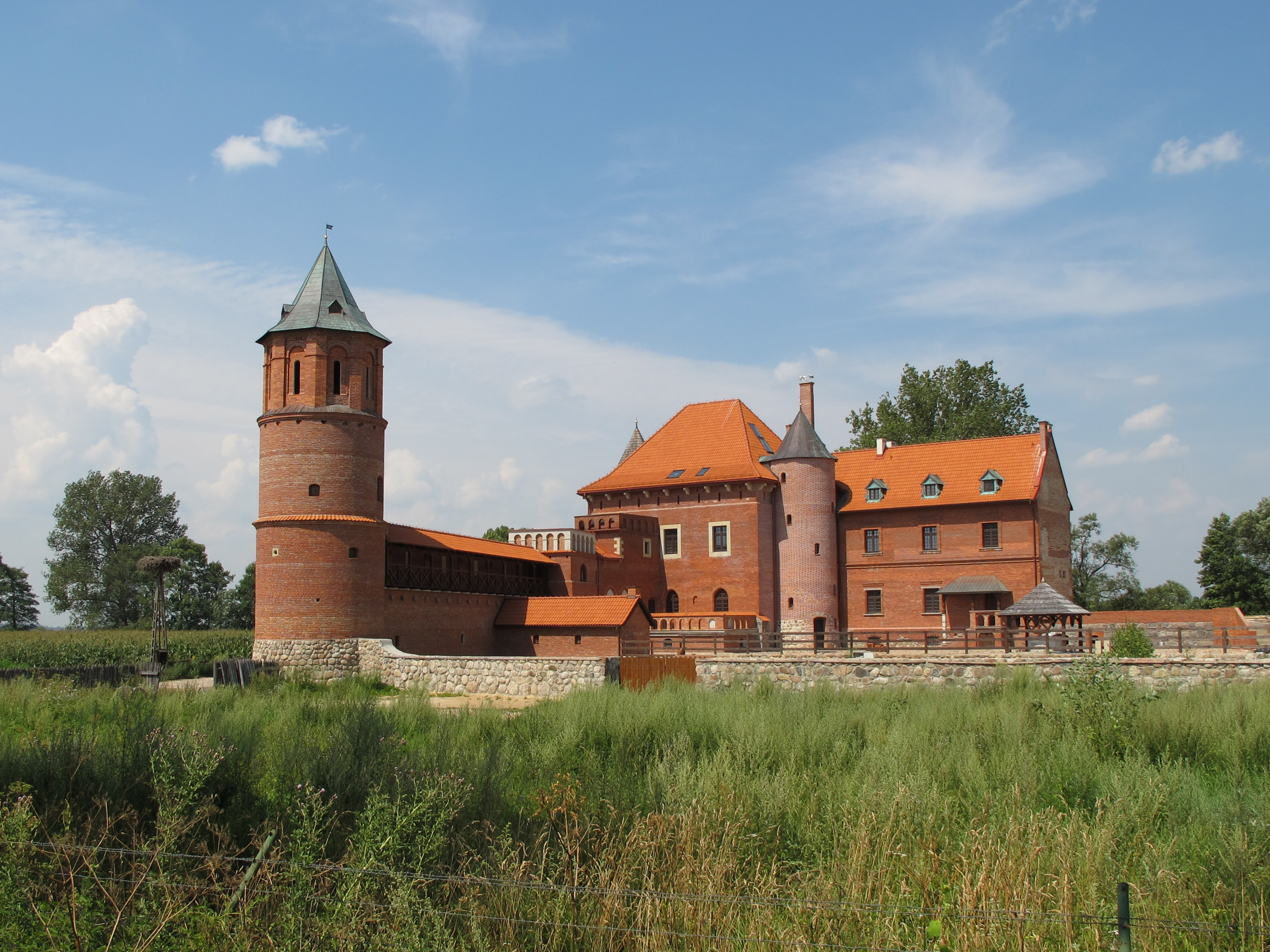
Tykocin Castle, commissioned by Goštautas in 1433

Jonas Goštautas secured positions as palatine (voivode) of Trakai in 1433 (gift from Grand Duke Sigismund), and from 1443 palatine of Vilnius and Chancellor of Lithuania. Holding the most important positions in the state and supporting young Grand Duke he became actual ruler of Lithuania until young Duke came of age and started his own policies as early as 1444. He successfully initiated the expansion of the Council of Lords' powers, made structural reforms, led assault on rebelling Kiev. When in 1444 Władysław died at battle of Varna, Polish politicians and leading lords insisted that Casimir should return to Kingdom of Poland and in 1445 the general assembly of nobility in Sieradz elected Casimir the new Polish king. After several years of protracted negotiations regarding Casimir's return to Kingdom of Poland as king, Grand Duke, Goštautas and other Lithuanian noblemen raised conditions before Casimir was to reign in Poland. Grand Duke, already emancipated from Goštautas, insisted on equality of nobility of both states, that Grand Duchy of Lithuania and Kingdom of Poland remain separate states, governed by one or two rulers, guarantee of the completeness of Grand Duchy borders and his own right to return to the Grand Duchy of Lithuania at will. After issuing another privilege in 1447, Casimir becoming a King of Poland.

After Casimir left Lithuania for Poland, for more than 10 years Goštautas worked for Lithuania until in 1456 he attempted to remove his King and Duke Casimir IV Jagiellon from the Duchy throne in favor of prince of Kiev Simeon Olelkowicz, but he failed and died two years later in 1458. However his son, Martin Goštautas was named the voivode of the newly created (upon death of prince Olelkowicz) Kiev voivodeship in 1471.

== Family ==
Jonas was the son of Andrius Goštautas and NN Buczacka h. Abdank (daughter of Michał Awdaniec z Buczacza h. Abdank and Małgorzata Koła h. Junosza. He married Dorota Zadora h. Zadora and had five children:

- Vaitiekus Goštautas, courtier
- Martynas Goštautas (died 1483), married Princess Anna Holszańska h. Hipocentaur
- Jurgis Goštautas, parson
- Marija Goštautaitė (died 1501), married Prince Simeon Olelkovich
- Aleksandra Goštautaitė, Franciscan

His second wife's name was Elżbieta.
