= Białobrzeski (Abdank) =

Abdank coat of arms of the Białobrzeski family

Białobrzeski (Polish: Białobrzescy) of Abdank coat of arms is the name of a Polish noble family.

== History ==
According to legend, the family was among envoys of Bolesław III Wrymouth. For the reign of John III Sobieski family members of the Białobrzeski were official delegates of sejmik in the sejm.

After the three partitions of Poland the Białobrzeski own less land and some properties (e.g. in Tuszyn). As a result of uprisings in the 19th century in partitioned Poland Białobrzeski lost even more land.

One of the best known members of the family that lived in the region Sieradz, is Casimir Białobrzeski, who was important in the introduction of the telephone network in Poland before World War II.
