= Stanislovas Goštautas =

Lithuanian noble (c. 1507 – 1542)

- Coat of arms
- Born: c. 1507; Vilnius, Grand Duchy of Lithuania
- Died: 18 December 1542 (aged 34–35)
- Noble family: Goštautai
- Spouse: Barbara Radziwiłł (m. 1537)
- Father: Albertas Goštautas
- Mother: Princess Sofia of Vereya
- Occupation: Lithuanian noble, Voivode of Navahrudak and Trakai

Stanislovas Goštautas (also called Stanisław Gasztołd or Gasztołt of Abdank in Polish; c. 1507 in Vilnius – 1542) was a member of the Lithuanian nobility and a high-ranking member of the Lithuanian administration. Born to Albertas Goštautas, the Voivode of Vilnius, and Princess Sofia of Vereya, he was the last direct male descendant of the Goštautai family.

A prominent member of the Grand Duchy's administration in the early times of the Polish–Lithuanian union, Goštautas held a number of important posts in the state's administration. Among others, since 1522, he held the post of the voivode of Navahrudak, although he did not rise to that office until 1530. Since 1542, he was also a voivode of Trakai. As one of the most notable and influential noblemen of his epoch, that same year, he was also awarded with a royal pension of 600 times the number of 60 Prague groschen in exchange for his town of Upytė, which was bought by Sigismund Augustus of Poland.

On 17 May 1537, he married Barbara Radziwiłł, later the second wife of the Grand Duke of Lithuania and King of Poland Sigismund II Augustus. Goštautas died on 18 December 1542, leaving some of his family fortune to his wife, who later might have passed it on to her branch of the Radziwiłł family, while the bulk of his estates was taken by the Grand Duke of Lithuania Sigismund II Augustus, as a matter of sovereign's right.
