= Trakai Voivodeship =

Voivodeship of the Grand Duchy of Lithuania

Coordinates: 54°38′22″N 24°56′06″E

Trakai Voivodeship Latin: Palatinatus Trocensis Lithuanian: Trakų vaivadija Polish: Województwo trockie
- Voivodeship of Grand Duchy of Lithuania (1413–1569); Polish–Lithuanian Commonwealth (1569–1795)
- 1413–1795
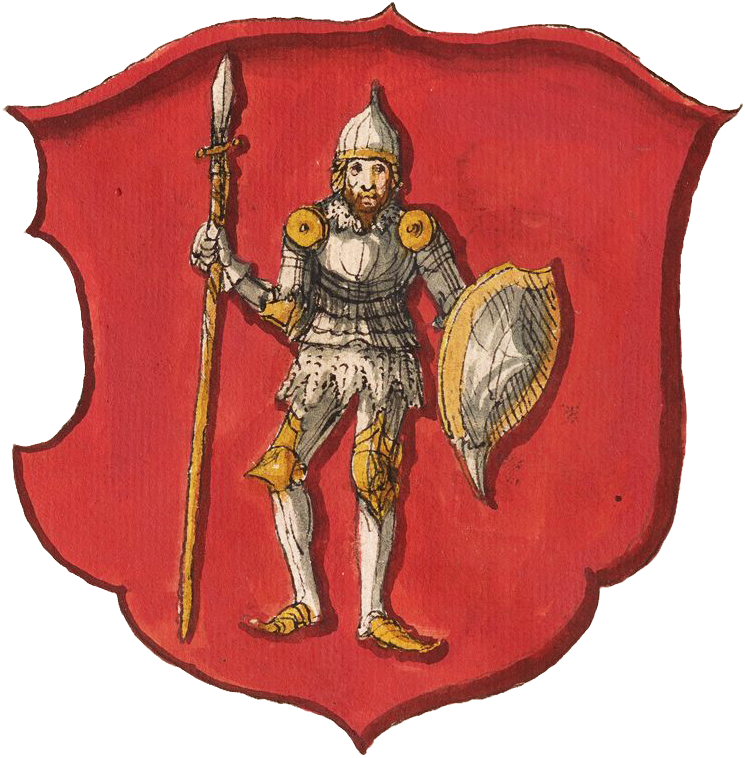
- Coat of arms

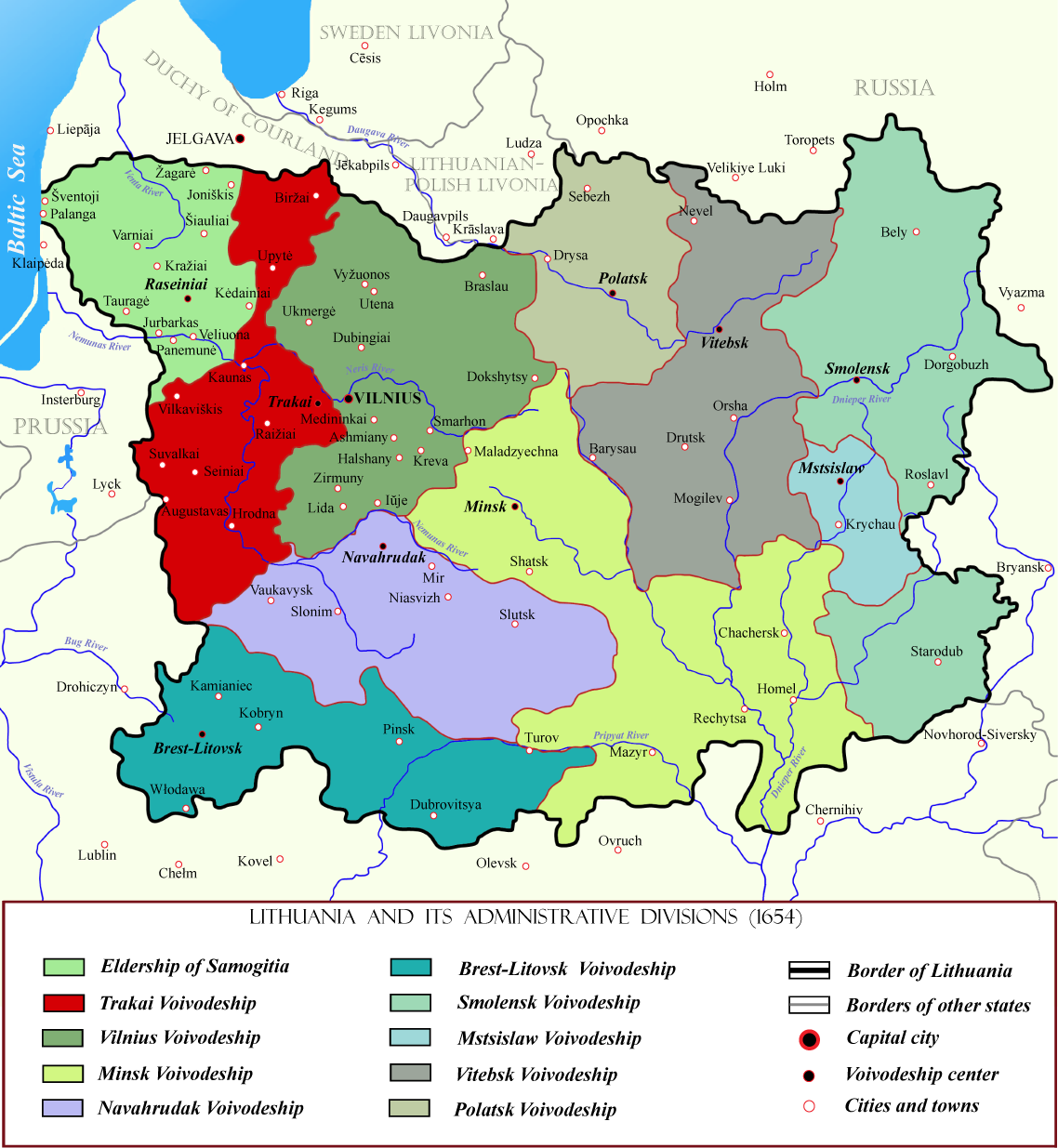
- Trakai Voivodeship (in red) in the 17th century

- Trakai Voivodeship in the Polish–Lithuanian Commonwealth
- Capital: Trakai
- Area
  - 1570: 31,100 km^{2} (12,000 sq mi)
  - 1790: 23,885 km^{2} (9,222 sq mi)
- Population
  - 1790: 288,000
  - Type: Monarchy
- Legislature: Sejmik
- History
  - Established by Union of Horodło: 1413
  - Union of Lublin: 1569
  - Third Partition of the Polish-Lithuanian Commonwealth: 1795
- Political subdivisions: Counties: 4
Preceded by
Duchy of Trakai
Succeeded by
Vilna Governorate
Grodno Governorate
East Prussia
Podlaskie Voivodeship (1513–1795)
- Today part of: Lithuania; Poland; Belarus
- Population and area are given according to Vaitiekūnas, Stasys (2006). Lietuvos gyventojai: Per du tūkstantmečius (in Lithuanian). Vilnius: Mokslo ir enciklopedijų leidybos institutas. pp. 53, 71. ISBN 5-420-01585-4.

Trakai Voivodeship, Trakai Palatinate, or Troki Voivodeship (Latin: Palatinatus Trocensis, Lithuanian: Trakų vaivadija, Polish: Województwo trockie), was a unit of administrative division and local government in the Grand Duchy of Lithuania from 1413 until 1795.

== History ==
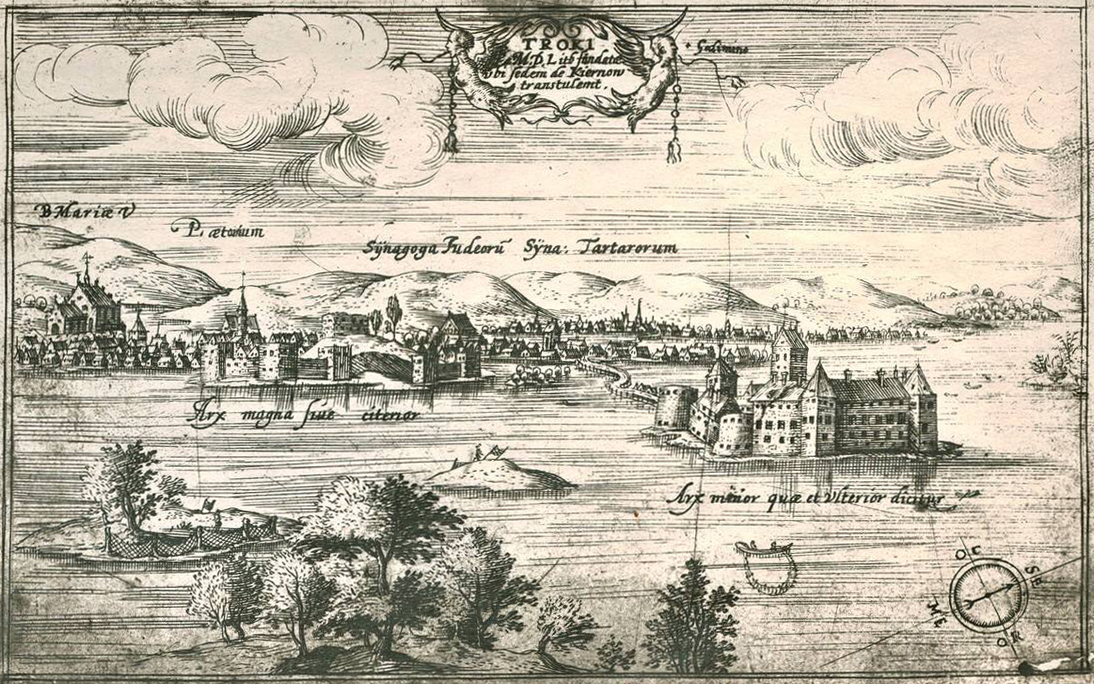
Trakai, capital of the voivodeship, in the 17th century

Trakai Voivodeship together with Vilnius Voivodeship was established by the Grand Duke of Lithuania Vytautas the Great in 1413 according to the Union of Horodło. Vytautas copied the Polish system of administrative division in order to centralize and strengthen the government. Trakai Voivodeship replaced the former Duchy of Trakai, which was ruled directly by the Grand Duke or his close relative (brother or son). The Duke of Trakai (Latin: dux Trocensis) was replaced by appointed officials – voivodes and his deputy castellan.

The voivodeship was divided into four powets: Grodno, Kaunas, Trakai (ruled directly by the voivode), and Upytė. The biggest cities in the voivodeship were Kaunas, Grodno and Trakai.

The western portion of the voivodeship was split off in 1513 by Sigismund I the Old and transferred to the Polish Crown. It was organized as the Podlaskie Voivodeship. In 1793, the counties of Grodno, Sokółka and Wołkowysk one of Nowogródek Voivodeship were merged into Grodno Voivodeship.

After the Union of Lublin the voivodeship, together with the whole Grand Duchy of Lithuania, became part of the Polish–Lithuanian Commonwealth until the partitions of the Commonwealth in 1795. Most of the territory became part of the Russian Empire, while territories west of the Neman River – part of the Province of East Prussia.

== Voivodes ==
The Voivode of Trakai (Polish: Wojewoda trocki, Lithuanian: Trakų vaivada) was one of the most important state offices in the Grand Duchy of Lithuania. They were appointed from prominent magnate families and competed only with voivode of Vilnius and Grand Chancellors for power and prestige. Voivodes were the ex officio members of the Lithuanian Council of Lords. Voivodes had their residence in Trakai city, near Galvė Lake, north of the Trakai Peninsula Castle.

=== List of voivodes ===
- Jonas Goštautas (1440)
- Iwaszko Moniwidowicz (1443–1458)
- Radvila Astikas (1466–1477)
- Martynas Goštautas (1480–1483)
- Jan Zabrzeziński (1498–1505)
- Olbracht Gasztołd (Albrecht Goštautas) (1519–1522)
- Konstanty Ostrogski (1522–1530)
- Stanisław Gasztołd (Stanislovas Goštautas) (1542)
- Mikołaj Krzysztof "the Orphan" Radziwiłł (1590–1604)
- Janusz Skumin Tyszkiewicz (1626–1640)
- Piotr Pac (X 1640–VII 1642)
- Mikołaj Abramowicz (1647–1651?)
- Marcjan Ogiński (since 1670)
- Tadeusz Franciszek Ogiński (1770–1783)
- Józef Mikołaj Radziwiłł (since 1788)
