= Abdank coat of arms =

Polish coat of arms

Abdank
- Battle cry: Abdaniec, Abdank, Awdaniec, Habdank, Hebdank
- Alternative names: Abdaniec, Abdanek, Abdank, Avdank, Awdancz, Awdaniec, Białkotka, Biłkotka, Czelejów, Habdaniec, Habdank, Haudaniec, Hawdaniec, Hebdank, Łąkotka, Łękawa, Łękawica, Skuba, Szczedrzyk
- Earliest mention: 1212 (seal)
- Cities: Obertyn, Rożniatów
- Families: 688 names A Abakanowicz, Abaszyński, Abczyńscy, Abłamowicz, Abokołtowski, Abramowicz, Abramowski, Abzołtowski, Abżałtowski, Adaszyński, Akajewicz, Alchimowicz, Alechnowicz, Ankiewicz, Ankowicz, Ankwicz. B Bałandowicz, Bankowski, Bańkowski, Bardziński, Bartoszewicz, Bączacki, Badzyński, Bejnarowicz, Belgard, Beńkiewicz, Berikiewicz, Bernacki, Berykiewicz, Bestrzejowski, Beszewski, Beszowski, Beynarowicz, Bęszewski, Białobrzeski, Białopiotrowicz, Białoskórski, Bielecki, Bieleński, Bielikowicz, Bieliński, Biernacki, Bileński, Biszewski, Biszowski, Bleszczewski, Bliński, Błaszkowski, Błażejewski, Błażejowski, Błożejewski, Bogowicz, Bogucki, Boguniewski, Bogusławski, Bohowicz, Bojnarowicz, Boliński, Bondziński, Borek, Borowski, Borowy, Borzykowski, Borzymiński, Borzymski, Bowiczyński, Bram, Brym, Brzezieński, Brzeziński, Brzozy, Bubel, Buczacki, Budaszewski, Budziszewski, Budziszowski, Bugowicz, Bujnowski, Bułhak, Bułhakowski, Burdynkiewicz, Burdzinkiewicz, Buss, Buszkowski, Butkiewicz, Bystrzejowski, Byszewski, Byszowski. C Cekliński, Celiński, Chalecki, Chamiec, Chodasewicz, Chodasiewicz, Choiński, Chojeński, Cholecki, Choryński, Chorzewski, Chorzowski, Chotyński, Chromecki, Ciekliński, Cielatycki, Cieleński, Cieliński, Cieśliński, Ciundziewicki, Ciundziewicz, Cudzynowski, Czacharowski, Czachorowski, Czachorski, Czachórski, Czarkowski, Czarnowski, Czeladka, Czeladko, Czelaj, Czelatycki, Czelej, Czerkawski, Czernik, Czeszaw, Częstocki, Częstowski, Czyczyn, Czyrski, Czyżewski. D Dąbrowski, Deliński, Dembiński, Dębiński, Dłoto, Doboszyński, Dobrycki, Dobrzycki, Dokurn, Dolanowski, Doliniański, Doliniawski, Doliński, Domaradzki, Domeradzki, Dousin, Dowejpo, Dowgiałło, Dowgiało, Dowgwił, Dowgwiłło, Dowgwiłowicz, Dowiat, Dowiatt, Dowsin, Drogosław, Dubiaha, Dubiaka, Dunikowski, Dupiński, Duszor, Duszota, Dworakowski, Dyrmont, Dżafarewicz. E Ejdrygiewicz, Ejgird, Ejgirt, Ejgierd, Eydrygowicz, Eydygrowicz. F Faskiewicz, Faśkiewicz, Formalski, Fornalski. G Gabriałowicz, Gabryałowicz, Gabryłowicz, Gambzarzowski, Gasztold, Gasztołt, Gasztowt, Gembarzewski, Gembarzowski, Gębarzewski, Ginc, Girdwojń, Girdwoyń, Goglewicz, Golejewski, Gombrowicz, Gorski, Goszczyc, Gotlib, Goylewicz, Górski, Grocholski, Gromacki, Gromadzki, Gromejko, Gronkiewicz, Guncz, Gurski. H Habdaniec, Habdański, Hadkowski, Hajewski, Hankiewicz, Haraburda, Harasimowicz, Harynek, Hawryłkiewicz, Hejewski, Herasimowicz, Hinek, Hinkowicz, Hołowski, Horowy, Hromyka, Hrydrygiewicz, Hryniewicz, Huniatycki. I Ilcewicz, Ilkowski, Irecki, Irycki, Iwanowicz, Iwaszkiewicz. J Jakuszewski, Jambut, Jankiewicz, Jankwicz, Janowski, Januszkowski, Jaszczołd, Jaszczołt, Jaszczułt, Jaszgiałło, Jazłowiecki, Jedleński, Jedliński, Jerecki, Józefowicz, Jugoszewski, Jugoszowski, Juniewicz, Junowicz, Jurkowski. K Kaczycki, Kagnimir, Kaimir, Kajmir, Kamieński, Kanimir, Kapliński, Karnicki, Karsiecki, Karski, Kaymir, Kazimir, Kazimirowicz, Kelcius, Kibort, Kielcz, Kielczewski, Kiełcz, Kiełczewski, Kiełczowski, Kierczewski, Kijeński, Klepacki, Klonowski, Kobyliński, Kocielski, Kodyński, Kojdański, Kołaczkowski, Kołączkowski, Kołpucewicz, Komorowski, Konarski, Koniński, Kopciewicz, Koplewski, Koporski, Kopulcewicz, Korewa, Kolrwel, Korweler, Korzecznicki, Korzeński, Korzybski, Kossowski, Koszowski, Kościałkowski, Kotarbski, Koteżdoma, Kowalczewski, Kowalski, Kozicki, Kozietulski, Kozubski, Kożubski, Krakowiński, Krassowski, Krobanowski, Kroczowski, Krośniewski, Kruszewski, Krzapiński, Krzykański, Krzywiński, Krzyżankowski, Krzyżanowski, Książnicki, Kunicki, Kuniński, Kunowski, Kupel, Kupiel, Kurjątkowski, Kurnicki, Kurządkowski, Kurzątkowski, Kurzjątkowski, Kwietniewski L Landsberg, Lasota, Lassota, Laszek, Laugmin, Lekarski, Lesczyński, Leszczyński, Lewikowski, Lewkowicz, Libnar, Lidzbański, Lidzbiński, Lipski, Litwinowski, Lubański, Lubiański, Lubiatowski, Lubrycki. Ł Łagiewnicki, Łasicki, Łasiecki, Łasieński, Łasiński, Łaszkiewicz, Łaszyński, Ławecki, Łażecki, Łeżecki, Łodwikowski, Łubnicki, Łuczek, Łużewski. M Magnowski, Magnuski, Magneski, Malanowski, Malarzowski, Malczewski, Malczowski, Malechowski, Malinowski, Małyszko, Marchilewicz, Maskowski, Maszczewicz, Maszkowski, Melbachowski, Melbechowski, Miałkowski, Mianowski, Michocki, Mieczkowski, Mieczychowski, Mieczykowski, Mielnicki, Mijanowski, Mikołajewski, Mikowski, Mikulski, Milewski, Milkiewicz, Milkowski, Miłkowski, Mingielewicz, Mleczkowski, Młynkowski, Mniszkowski, Moczulski, Modestowicz, Mojgis, Mołczenko, Mongin, Mrawiński, Mrowiński, Mużyło. N Napruszewski, Narbut, Narbutt, Niedźwiecki, Niedźwiedzki, Niemczyński, Nieprowski, Nos. O Obornicki, Oborski, Odechowski, Ofan, Offan, Olechnowicz, Oporowski, Orlikowski, Osiecki, Ossowski, Ostaszewski, Ostrzewski-Skarbek, Ostrzyński, Oszczepalski. P Pakosławski, Pakosz, Pakoszek, Paliszewski, Paskowski, Paszkiewicz, Paszkowski, Perlejewski, Pękosławski, Piastowski, Piczkowski, Pietraszkiewicz, Pietrzyk, Piętka, Piotraszewski, Piotrowski, Piotruchowski, Piwka, Piwko, Pniewski, Pniowski, Pokosławski, Polak, Pomorski, Porczyński, Probol, Probolewski, Probołowski, Pruśliński, Przeborowski, Przemieniecki, Przezwicki, Przezwycki, Przyborowski, Przybylski, Psarski, Puczniewski, Puczniowski, Pudliszkowski, Puklewicz, Pukoszek, Putel, Putell, Putwiński, Pywko. R Raczek, Radlicki, Radomyski, Radoński, Raduński, Radzanowski, Radziątkowski, Ragowski, Rajewski, Rajkowski, Rajmir, Raser, Rasiewicz, Ratoski, Ratowski, Ratowt, Raykowski, Raymer, Raymir, Razicki, Razmus, Razmuss, Rażek, Rąblewski, Reanadski, Regowski, Rekowski, Renadzki, Rentfiński, Rewieński, Rewkuć, Rętfiński, Rogowski, Rogoziński, Rogoźniski, Roguski, Rohoziński, Rojewski, Rojowski, Rokuć, Rosieński, Rowbecki, Rowbicki, Rowecki, Rozbarski, Rozborski, Rudzki, Rukomyski, Rusiecki, Rybski, Rzeczycki. S Saczkowski, Saduński, Salawa, Sampławski, Sampłowski, Sawdarg, Sczyjeński, Sednik, Sędzicz, Skarbek, Skoraszewski, Skoraszowski, Skorko, Skoroczewski, Skoroszewski, Skóra, Skórecki, Skóroszewski, Skuba, Slanka, Sławicki, Słąka, Słąnczyński, Słąnka, Słomczyński, Słomka, Słomowski, Słomski, Słumek, Słumka, Słupski, Słysz, Słyszewski, Sokół, Sokulski, Stański, Starak, Starnawski, Starosiedliski, Starosiedlski, Starosielski, Starski, Stefanowski, Stopiczyński, Stpiczyński, Stromejko, Suchodolec, Suchodolski, Sudolski, Sudowicz, Swoszewski, Swoszowski, Szczycieński, Szczyciński, Szczygielski, Szczygłowicz, Szczyjeński, Szelew, Szepicha, Szepig, Szlagier, Szpaczyński, Szpakowicz, Szumkowski. Ś Ślanka, Ślaski, Śliz, Śliza, Ślizowski, Śliź, Śliż, Śmiatkowski, Śmiątkowski, Śniatkowski, Świniarski, Świrnowski. T Tafiłowski, Telatycki, Telszewski, Terpiłowski, Tholiborski, Toczycki, Toczyłowski, Toczyński, Toczyski, Tolbowski, Tolibowski, Tolszewski, Torczyński, Tracewski, Traczewski, Trafiłowski, Trojan, Trzebiński, Twerjanowicz, Tworowski, Tworziański, Tworzyański, Tygirt. U Ustarbowski. W Wagiad, Walowski, Wałowski, Warakomski, Warakowski, Warnecki, Warszycki, Warzycki, Warzyński, Wat, Watyl, Watraszewski, Ważeński, Ważyński, Wąborkowski, Wąwelski, Werpowski, Węgierski, Widawski, Wielebicki, Wielebycki, Wieliczki, Wieliczko, Wielobicki, Wielobycki, Wierciechowski, Wierciński, Wierzba, Wiklański, Wisławski, Wisłobocki, Wiszowaty, Witowski, Włostowski, Wodziczeński, Wodzinowski, Wojczyński, Wojdak, Wojenkowski, Wojewódzki, Wojnicz, Wojniewicz, Wołczecki, Wołczek, Wołyniecki, Wołyński, Wosczyński, Woszczyński, Woydag, Wsołowski, Wychowski, Wyłyniecki, Wysławski, Wyszławski, Wyszowaty. Z Zagołłowicz, Zakrzewski, Zaleski, Zastępowski, Zawadzki, Zbychalski, Zbytkont, Zdanowicz, Zelantkowski, Zielątkowski, Złotun, Zytyński. Ż Żagołłowicz, Żakowicz, Żągołłowicz, Żerański, Żeroński, Żędzicki, Żołędź, Żołłędź, Żukowski, Żuprański, Żytyński, Żywiłło.

Abdank is a Polish coat of arms. It was used by hundreds of Polish, Lithuanian (including Samogitian), and Ruthenian (Ukrainian and Belarusian) szlachta families in the times of the Kingdom of Poland and the Polish–Lithuanian Commonwealth.

== Blazon ==
Gules łękawica argent, crest: łąkawica as in arms.

== History ==
According to Kasper Niesiecki, the beginning of this shield dates from the time of Krakus, a mythological Polish monarch who founded and gave his name to the city of Kraków. On Wawel Mount, where Kraków's castle stood, from the Wisła (Vistula) river side, a man-eating dragon showed up. One day a man called Skuba, a young shoemaker, took the skin of a flayed sheep, put tar and sulphur and fire-brand into it and threw it into the dragon's lair. The dragon, not recognizing the deception, assumed it was a sacrifice from the people of Kraków and ate the fake sheep. The fire in his belly ignited it and as a result the dragon became very thirsty. He drank and drank the water from the Wisła river until he finally exploded and died. For his heroic deed Krakus granted Skuba the letter "W" to his shield, standing either for wąż (snake) or for Wawel. This letter can be seen on the Abdank coat of arms.

The Awdaniec Clan (such as it may be) has been called variously: "Awdaniec," "Abdaniec," "Abdanka," "Awdanc," "Awdanczyc," "Habdaniec," "Habdank," "Habdaniec," "Hebdank," "Lakotka," "Lekawa," "Lekawica," "Lekotka," "Bialkotka," "Szczedrzyk," "Skuba," and probably other things similar and dissimilar. Known recorded war cries are: "Abdaniec!," "Abdank!,""Awdaniec!," "Habdank!," and "Hebdank!."

== Abdank in literature ==
In Henryk Sienkiewicz's "With Fire and Sword" the Cossack leader Bohdan Khmelnytsky, wishing to hide his true identity, falsely introduces himself to the main protagonist Skrzetuski as "Zenobi Abdank, Abdank Coat of Arms, Abdank with a cross, a nobleman of Kiev county".

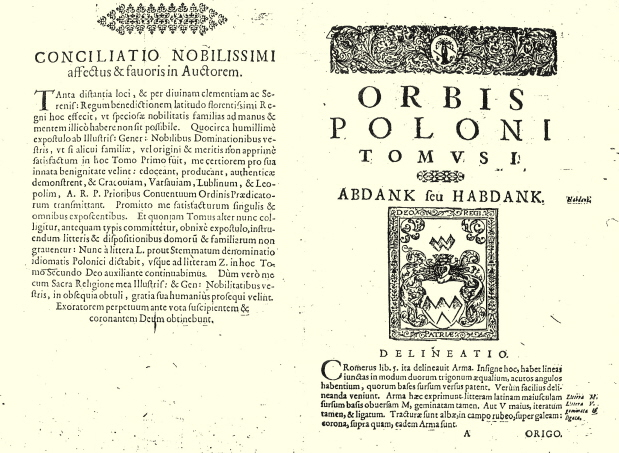
Abdank coat of arms on a page of armorial "Orbis Poloni" written by Simon Okolski (1642, Kraków)

== Notable bearers ==
Notable bearers of this Coat of Arms include:

- Józef Ankwicz, Deputy to the Great Sejm
- Andrzej Alojzy Ankwicz, Roman Catholic archbishop of Prague
- Skarbmir count palatine of Poland
- Bernard Zdzisław Skarbek, Count, Colonel 3rd Carpathian Rifle Division (Poland); World War II battles: Battle of Monte Cassino, Battle of Ancona, Battle of Bologna
- Martynas Goštautas
- Jonas Goštautas
- Albrecht Goštautas
- Stanislovas Goštautas
- Marian Toczyński
- Jerzy Jazłowiecki
- Bohdan Khmelnytsky, leader of the Khmelnytsky Uprising
- Jan Konarski, Bishop of Kraków
- Alfred Korzybski, linguist
- Jan Kozietulski, commander of the Polish cavalry charge at the Battle of Somosierra
- Ignacy Skarbek-Kruszewski, Polish and Belgian general
- Boguslaw Kruszewski, sailor
- Mikołaj Kruszewski
- Miroslawa Kruszewska, writer, poet
- Konrad Johann Kruszewski, artist, graphic designer
- Mieszko Boguslaw Kruszewski, translator, writer
- Tomasz Włodzimierz Kruszewski, veteran
- Kazimierz Rudzki
- Wilfrid Voynich (born Michał Habdank-Wojnicz)
- Ivan Vyhovsky, hetman of the Ukrainian Cossacks
- Christine Granville (born Krystyna Skarbek)
- Michał Haraburda

== See also ==
- Polish heraldry
- Heraldic family
- List of Polish nobility coats of arms

== Related coat of arms ==
- Syrokomla coat of arms

== Bibliography ==
- Bartosz Paprocki: Herby rycerstwa polskiego na pięcioro ksiąg rozdzielone, Kraków, 1584.
- Tadeusz Gajl: Herbarz polski od średniowiecza do XX wieku : ponad 4500 herbów szlacheckich 37 tysięcy nazwisk 55 tysięcy rodów. L&L, 2007. ISBN 978-83-60597-10-1.
- Schlesinger, Edward Ondřej von: Die Wappengenossenschaft Abdank und deren Abwandlungen mit lateinisch-kyrillischen und kyrillisch-lateinischen Konvertierungstabelle der Geschlechternamen, in: Schriftenreihe für angewandte Sozialgeschichte StudIaS - Heraldik, Serie der Wappengenossenschaften der Res Publica, Band 2, Eitorf 2025, VI + 270 Seiten, (ger.) ISBN 9783819 211 829.
