= Vilnius Voivodeship =

Voivodeship of Lithuania (1413–1795)

Coordinates: 54°40′58″N 25°16′12″E

Vilnius Voivodeship Lithuanian: Vilniaus vaivadija Polish: Województwo wileńskie
- Voivodeship of Grand Duchy of Lithuania (part of the federative Polish–Lithuanian Commonwealth since 1569)
- 1413–1795
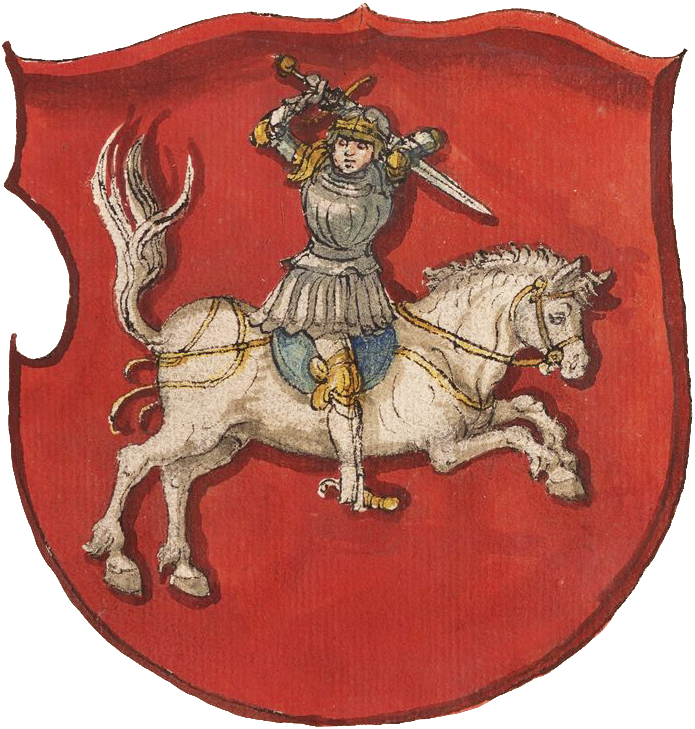
- Coat of arms

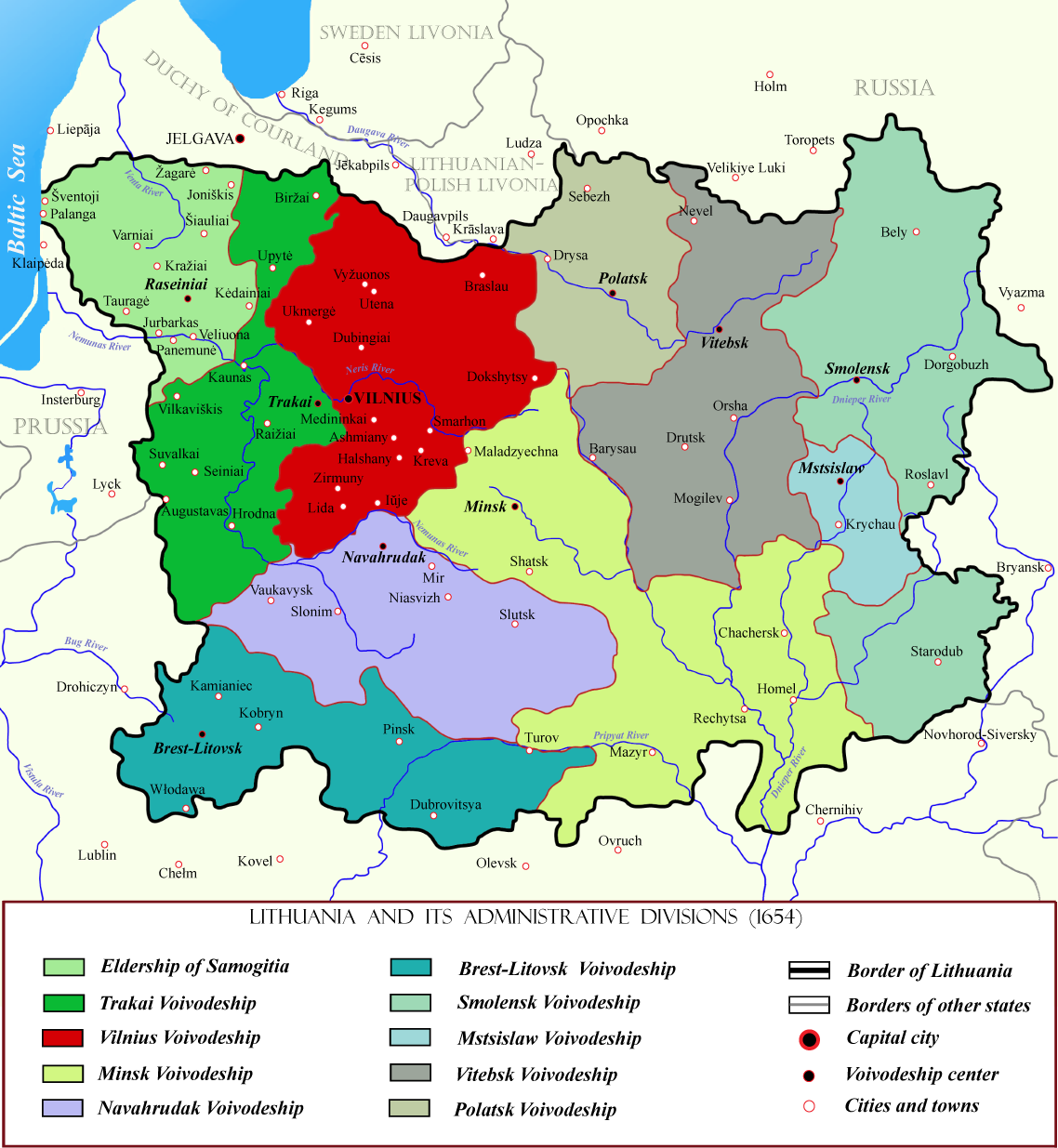
- Vilnius Voivodeship in red. Voivodeship's borders did not change since the Union of Lublin.

- Vilnius Voivodeship in the Polish–Lithuanian Commonwealth
- Capital: Vilnius
- Area
- 44,200 km^{2} (17,100 sq mi)
- History
  - Union of Horodło: 1413
  - Third partition of the Polish–Lithuanian Commonwealth: 1795
- Political subdivisions: counties (aka. pavietas, powiat): five
Preceded by	Succeeded by
Duchy of Lithuania	Vilna Governorate
- Today part of: Lithuania; Belarus; Latvia¹
- ¹ Small portion around Aknīste

The Vilnius Voivodeship (Latin: Palatinatus Vilnensis, Lithuanian: Vilniaus vaivadija, Polish: województwo wileńskie, Belarusian: Віленскае ваяводства) was one of the Grand Duchy of Lithuania's voivodeships, which existed from the voivodeship's creation in 1413 to the destruction of the Lithuanian state in 1795. This voivodeship was Lithuania's largest, most politically and economically important.

== History ==
Coat of arms of the Vilnius Voivodeship

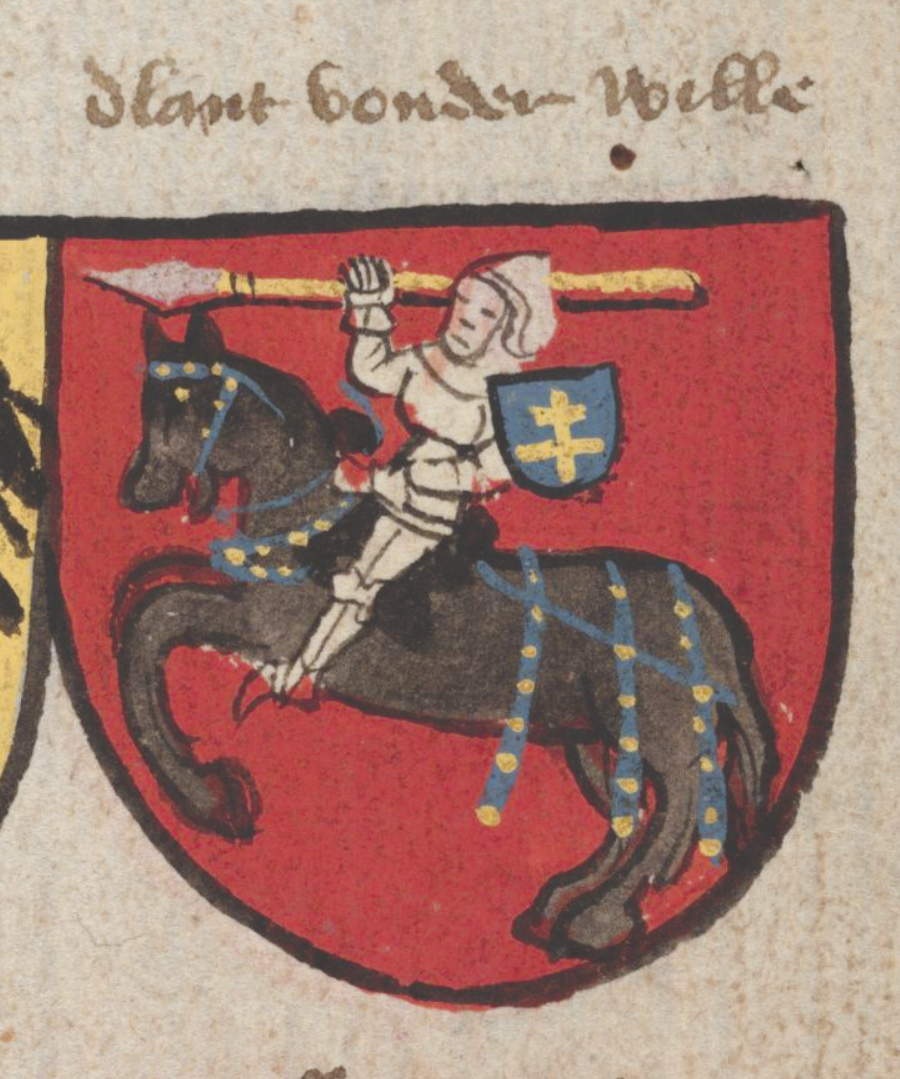
The Voivodeship's coat of arms in 1430s, depicted in the Armorial Lyncenich

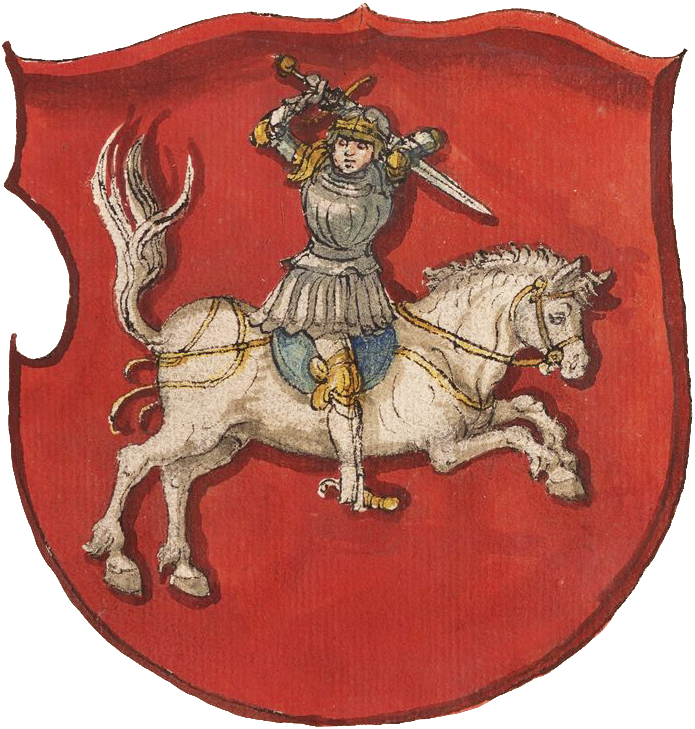
The Voivodeship's coat of arms in 1555

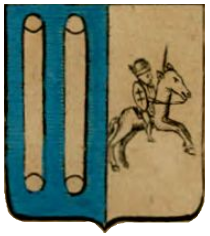
As depicted in 1712

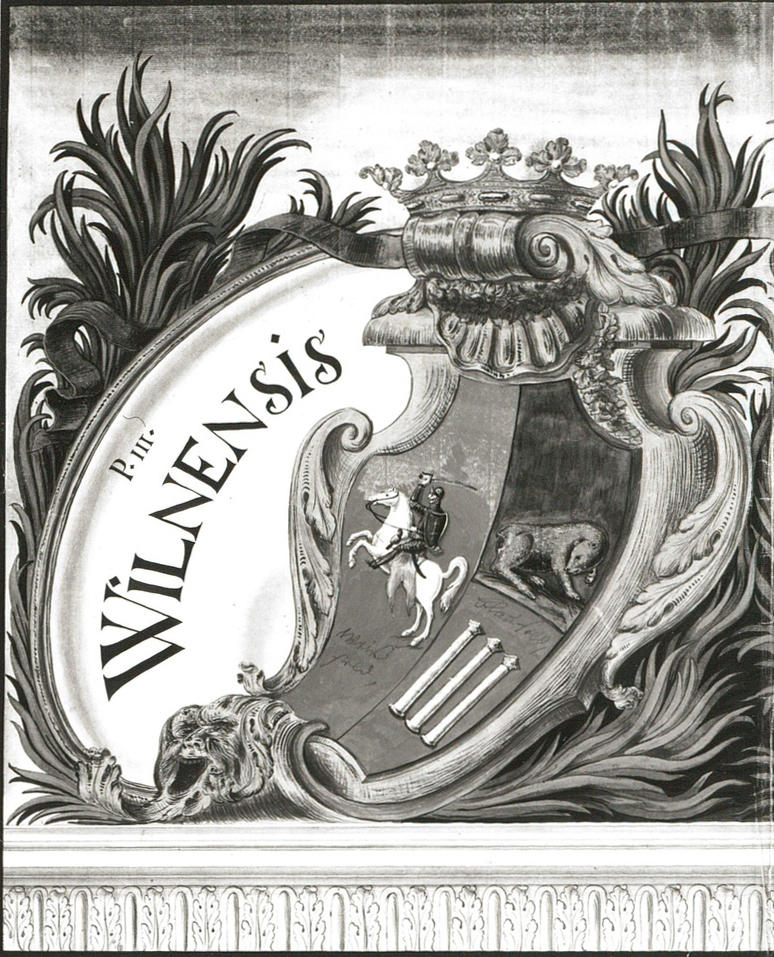
As depicted in 1720

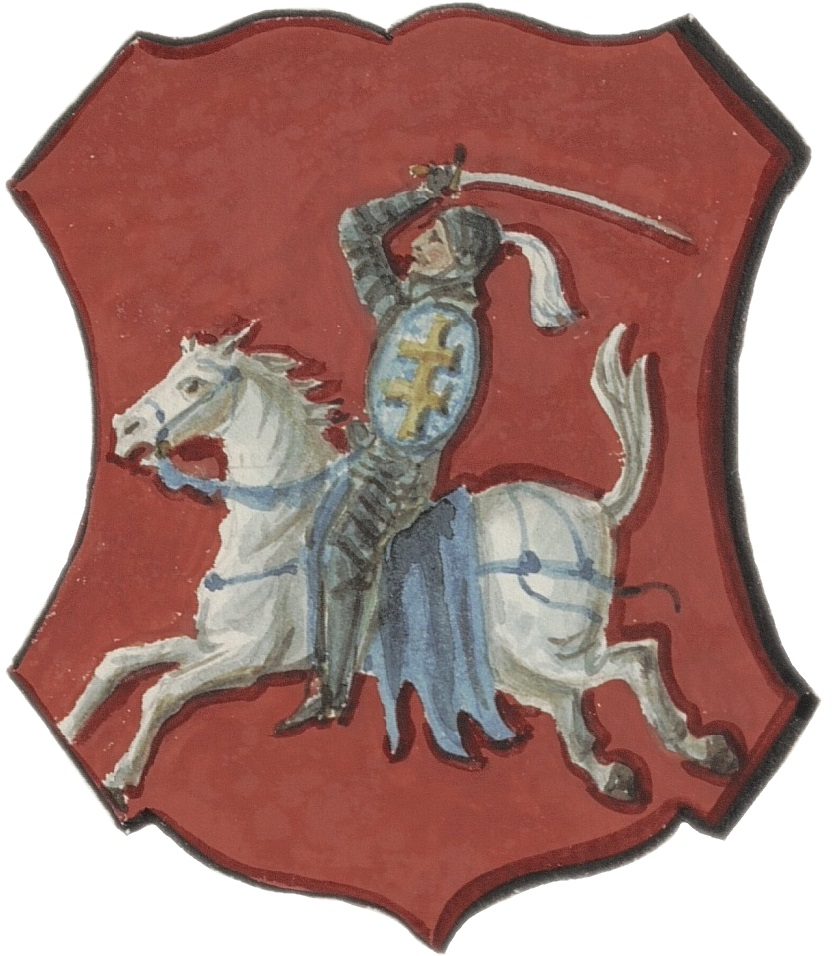
As depicted in 1875

=== 1413-1566 ===
The Vilnius Voivodeship was created instead of the Vilnius Viceroyalty (Lithuanian: Vilniaus vietininkija) during the Pact of Horodło in 1413.

The core of the Vilnius Voivodeship was the Vilnius County, which was composed of the Vilnius Bailiwick (Lithuanian: Vilniaus tijūnija), which was composed of the manors of Vilnius, Nemenčinė, Švenčionys, Dysna and other places, in addition to almost all of Lithuania on both side of Neris. Also included was the Breslauja Viceroyalty (Lithuanian: Breslaujos vietininkija), Svir, the lands of the dukes Giedraičiai and the counties of the so-called Lithuanian Rus', which included Maladzyechna, Hajna, Minsk, Barysaw, Rechytsa, Svisloch, Propoysk‑Chachersk. In the Upper Dnieper, the Vilnius Voivodeship had half of the Horval, Liubushany and Babruysk parishes, whose remaining part belonged to the Trakai Voivodeship. From Vitebsk's lands, the Vilnius Voivodeship received Mogilev, which belonged to the Grand Duchess of Lithuania, Knyazhytsi, Tyatseryn and Aboltsi. Moreover, the Principalities of Alšėnai, Kletsk, Novogrudok, Slutsk, Trobos and Izyaslavl were part of the Vilnius Voivodeship. Novogrudok became a separate Voivodeship in 1507.

The Vilnius Voivodeship was the location of many large estates. These were centred on the following places and owned by those families: Goštautai owned Hieraniony, the Radziwiłłs had Nyasvizh and Dubingiai, Zaberezinskiai had Zaberezinas, while the Astikai had Vyžuonos.

=== 1566-1795 ===
In 1566, during the administrative and judicial reforms of 1564–66, Vilnius Voivodeship was divided into the counties of Vilnius, Ashmyany, Braslaw, Lida (assigned from Trakai Voivodeship), Vilkmergė. Simultaneously, Vitebsk' lands, the Upper Dnieper, most of the Lithuanian Rus', the Principalities of Kletsk and Sluck were separated from the Vilnius Voivodeship.

== Aftermath ==
=== 19th century ===
After the partitions of the Polish–Lithuanian Commonwealth, the Vilnius Voivodeship was occupied by the Russian Empire. Most of the territory became the Vilna Governorate. In 1843, its northern part was assigned to Kovno Governorate.

=== 20th century ===
After World War I, the lands of the former Vilnius Voivodeship were fought over by the Lithuanian Army, Central Lithuania with its Army, the Polish Army, and the Red Army. Following the annexation of Central Lithuania by Poland, during the Interwar, most of the former Voivodeship ended up under the Second Polish Republic while the rest was ruled by Lithuanians. According to the Soviet–Lithuanian Peace Treaty in 1920, most of the former voivodeship should have been part of Lithuania. After World War II, the occupying Soviet Union assigned most of the voivodeship's territory that was previously under Polish rule to the Byelorussian Soviet Socialist Republic.

== Geography and administrative division ==
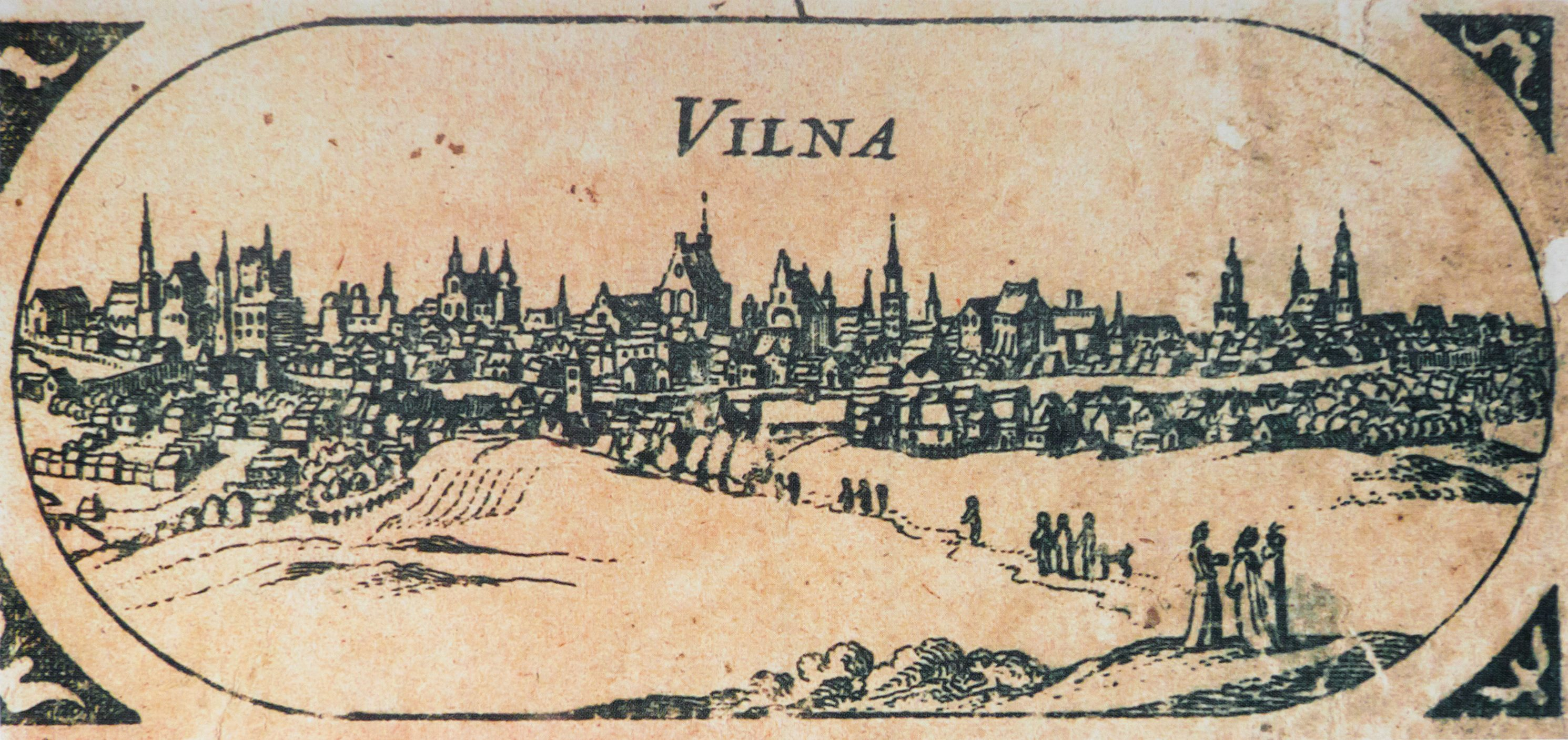
Wilno, capital of the voivodeship, in the 17th century

Geographically the area was centred on the city of Vilnius, which had always been the capital of the entity and the seat of a voivode. However, the actual territory of the voivodeship varied over time. Together with the Trakai Voivodeship it was known as Lithuania proper. Until the partitions of the Polish–Lithuanian Commonwealth the voivodeship, also known as a palatinate, was composed of five counties (Lithuanian: plural - pavietai, singular - pavietas):

- Vilnius County
- Ashmyany County
- Braslaw County
- Lida County
- Vilkmergė County

== Voivodes ==
The Voivode of Vilnius was ranked first in importance among the secular members of the Lithuanian Council of Lords. In the voivode hierarchy of Poland–Lithuania, established by the Union of Lublin in 1569, the Voivode of Vilnius, who was also a senator of the Polish–Lithuanian Sejm, took the fourth place and the Castellan of Vilnius - the sixth place.

== See also ==
- Administrative divisions of Lithuania

== Sources ==
- Gudavičius, Edvardas (1999). Lietuvos istorija (in Lithuanian). Vol. 1 - Nuo seniausių laikų iki 1569 metų. Vilnius. ISBN 9-986-39-111-3.
- Gudavičius, Edvardas (2022). "Vilniaus vaivadija". Vle.lt (in Lithuanian). Archived from the original on 24 February 2022.
