= Saint Juliana =

Saint Juliana may refer to:

== People ==
- Saint Juliana (died 270), martyred with her brother Paul (see Paul and Juliana)
- Saint Juliana of Nicomedia (died 304), virgin and martyr
- Saint Juliana of Liège (1193–1252), also known as St. Juliana of Mt. Cornillon
- Saint Juliana of Lazarevo (1530–1604), Russian Orthodox saint
- Saint Juliana Falconieri (1270–1341), Italian foundress of the Servite Third Order
- Julian of Norwich (1342–1416), one of the greatest English mystics
- Juliana Olshanskaya (c. 1525 - c. 1540), Eastern Orthodox saint from the Olshanski family
- Sts. Juliana and Semproniana are martyrs associated with the legend of Saint Cucuphas

== Places ==
- St. Juliana's Abbey in the Netherlands
- St. Juliana School, an Archdiocese of Chicago elementary school

== See also ==
- Juliana (disambiguation)
- Julia (disambiguation)
