= Paweł Stefan Sapieha =

Polish-Lithuanian noble and magnate

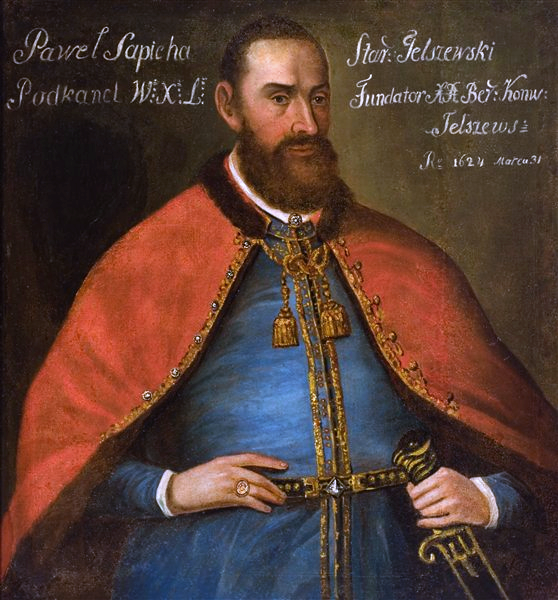

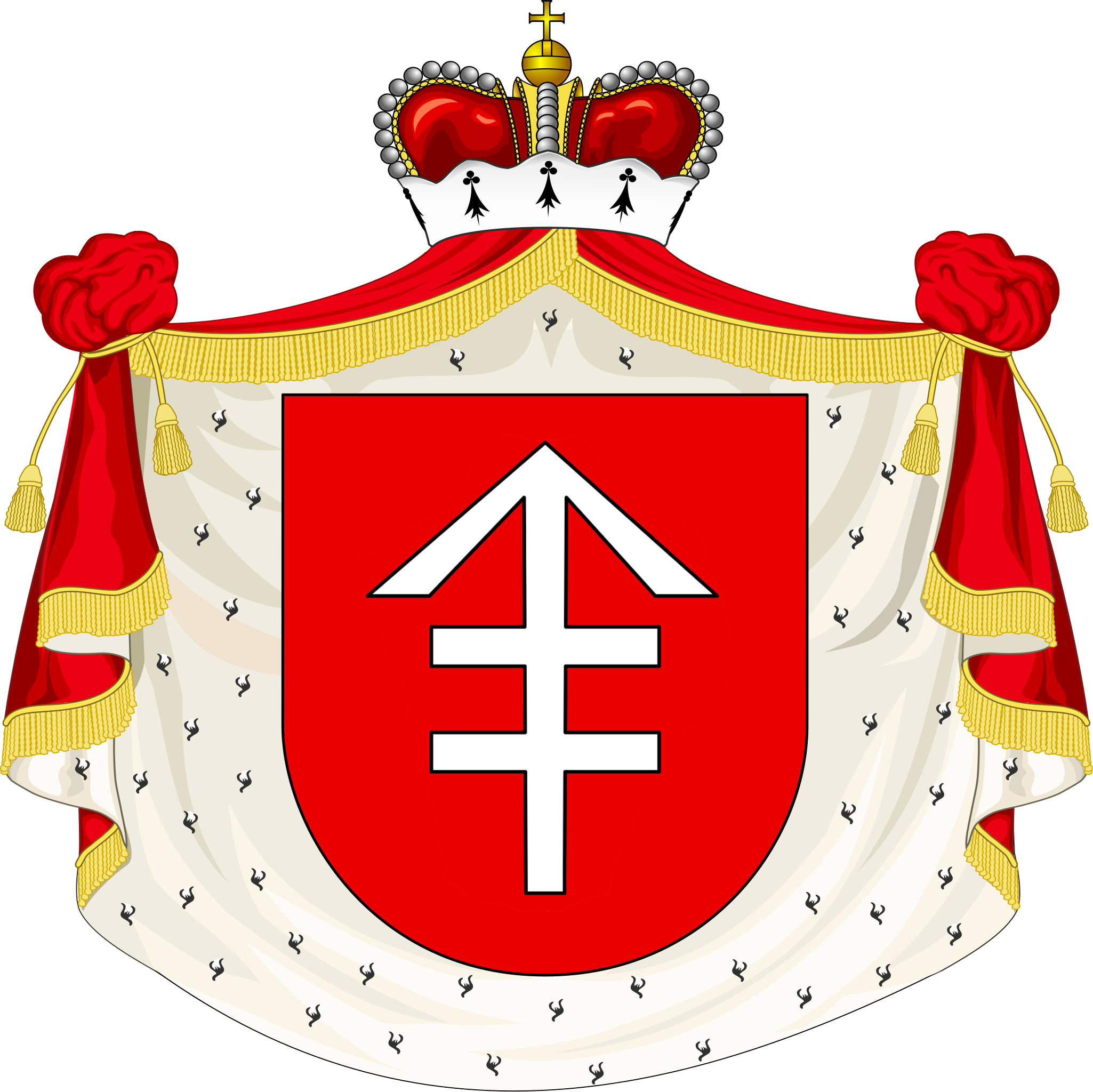

Paweł Stefan Sapieha (Belarusian: Павел Стэфан Сапега; Lithuanian: Povilas Steponas Sapiega; c. 1565–1635). Lis coat of arms was a Polish–Lithuanian noble and magnate, Grand Lithuanian Koniuszy from 1593, Deputy Chancellor of Lithuania from 1623, starosta.

== Genealogy ==
Scion of the great Ruthenian and Lithuanian families of the Great Duchy of Lithuania (including the Kapustich, Gastold and Holszanski families), was a son of voivode of Minsk Bohdan Pawłowicz Sapieha (who was son of voivode of Navahrudak Paweł Sapieha) and Maryna, duchess Kapuścianka (of the princes Kapusta/Kapustich of Pereiaslav); and brother to Mikołaj Sapieha (1588–1638), famous military commander Andrzej Sapieha, Barbara (Wolowiczowa), Zofia (Hajek and later Pac), Anna (Tryzna), and fourth a sister who was a nun in the Sisters of the Order of St. Basil the Great.

== Life ==
He inherited the Halshany seat of his family, and early started his political and military career, participating in wars fought by the Polish-Lithuanian Commonwealth. He fought in the Polish–Muscovite War from 1609 to 1611, losing a hand during the siege of Smolensk. Supporter of Polish-Swedish peace and alliance against the Muscovy in negotiations ending the Polish–Swedish wars in a truce signed and known as Treaty of Stuhmsdorf in 1635. Took part, bringing his own troops, in the Smolensk War against the Muscovites, but returned early due to poor health. Paweł Stefan Sapieha owned, among others, the estates surrounding the Zamek holszański (Halshany Castle), and in fact he was the one who commissioned the famous castle to have been built. In 1618 he founded the Franciscan monastery and a Roman Catholic church in Halshany (both run by the Franciscans), while he caused to close the existing Protestant church there and given the property to the Roman Catholic Church, administered by the Basilian monks. He lavished money and precious gifts to the founded churches and monasteries He died in his castle and was buried within the church he founded in Halshany. The church bell had the following Latin inscription: Paulus Sapieha Dux in Holszany Procancellarius M. D. L.

== Family ==
He was married four times, first Regina Chalecka, Chalecki coat of arms first, upon her death married Katarzyna Gosławska (Oksza coat of arms), then Elisabeth Vesselini (daughter of a Hungarian voivode), and finally Zofia Danilowiczowna, (Daniłowicz family Sas coat of arms). He had three daughters: Katarzyna and Tekla who became nuns, while Krystyna married Jan Hieronim Chodkiewicz, Kościesza coat of arms.
