= Ivan Olshansky =

Lithuanian noble (died after 1402)

- Full name: Belarusian: Іван Гальшанскі; Lithuanian: Jonas Alšėniškis; Polish: Iwan Holszański; Ukrainian: Іван Гольшанський
- Died: in or after 1402
- Noble family: Olshanski
- Issue: Uliana Olshanska; Alexandr Olshanski; Andrew Olshanski; Micheal Olshanski; Simanas Olshanski
- Father: Algimantas Olshanksi

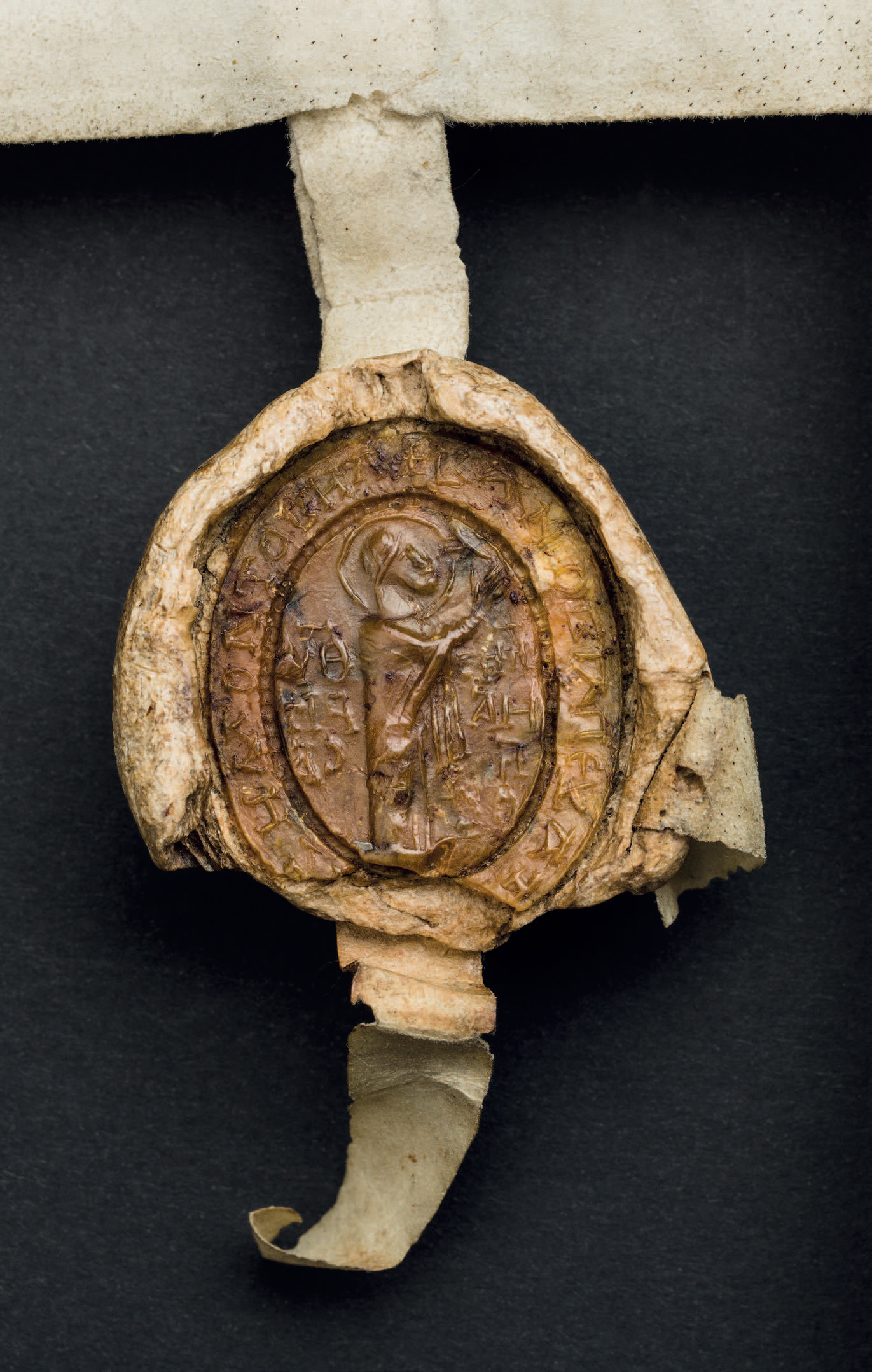
Seal of Prince Ivan Holshansky attached to the document of the Grand Duke Vytautas of Lithuania issued in Merkinė on 12 January 1390. The field of the seal bears an image of the Virgin Mary standing fully erect, facing right, wearing a maphorion, a himation and a mitre, with a halo surrounding her head and her hands raised in a gesture of prayer. She is blessed from Heaven by the "Hand of God". The epithet of the Mother of God - Hagiosoritissa - is engraved in Greek. In the rim there is an inscription: IВАNОВА ПЕЧАТ[...]КИМОNТОВИ(Ч)А.

Ivan Olshanski or Olshansky (Note: Belarusian: Іван Гальшанскі, romanized: Ivan Halshansky; Lithuanian: Jonas Alšėniškis or Jonas Algimantaitis Alšėniškis; Polish: Iwan Olgimuntowicz Holszański; Ukrainian: Іван Ольгимонтович Гольшанський.) (died in or after 1402) was a member of the Lithuanian princely Alšėniškiai (Holshansky) family. Historians only know his father's name, Algimantas. Ivan was a faithful companion of Vytautas the Great, Grand Duke of Lithuania. They both were married to daughters of Sudimantas of Eišiškės. Ivan's daughter Juliana became the third wife of Vytautas in 1418. His granddaughter Sophia became the fourth wife of King Władysław Jagiełło in 1424.

His patrimony consisted of Halshany, Iwye, Hlusk, Porechye and others.

== Biography ==
Ivan first appears as one of Jogaila's boyars during the truce between Lithuanian princes and the Prussian branch of the Teutonic Order in 1379. Then he was present during the signing of a treaty of Dovydiškės in 1380. When Vytautas escaped to the Teutonic Knights in 1382, Ivan followed him and Jogaila confiscated his Principality of Alšėnai. However, as Vytautas and Jogaila reconciled few years later, Ivan gifted Jogaila with a golden belt and received his principality back. Ivan followed Vytautas when he escaped to the knights once again in 1390 during the Lithuanian Civil War. In late 1390, Ivan escorted Sophia, the only child of Vytautas, to Moscow via Marienburg, Danzig and Pskov, where she married Vasily I of Moscow. After Vytautas gained a powerful ally in the east, Jogaila agreed to make peace and Treaty of Astravas was signed in 1392. Ivan became the right hand of Vytautas, and after Skirgailas death, he ruled Kiev as governor.

Knowing the influence Ivan had in the Grand Duchy of Lithuania, the Teutonic Order demanded that Ivan Holshansky ratified treaties, for example the Treaty of Salynas of 1398. He and his sons signed the Pact of Vilnius and Radom in 1401. On 12 February 1401 in Merkinė he swore allegiance to Jogaila (King Władysław), and the Polish Crown in the event of the death of Grand Duke Vytautas. On each of these occasions he appears without the title of the ruler of Kiev, so it is possible that his reign there was short and ended already before 1398. The allegiance to king Władysław was the last documented mention of him, and it is believed that he died in the same year or shortly after.

== Religion ==
He was a Ruthenianized Orthodox Christian. At his baptism he took the name Boris. His father Algimantas (Polish: Olgimunt) was baptised in the Orthodox faith under the name of Michael, during his rite of tonsure he received the name of Euthymius.

== Family ==
Ivan's wife was Agrypina, daughter of Prince of Smolensk Sviatoslav Ivanovich, possible sister of Anna, wife of Grand Duke Vytautas. They had four sons: Andrew, Semen, Aleksander and Michael, and daughter Uliana, married first to Prince of Karachev later to Grand Duke Vytautas.

== Mentions in document ==
- 1379: Iwan Augemunten son
- 1390: herczog Iwan von Galschan Ongemundes son
- 1398: Iwanen Awmunten son
- 1398: dux Ywan de Gloschaw
- 1401: dux Yvanus Olgimuntis cum filiis suis videlicet Andrea et Semeone et ceteris
- 1401: knjazь Iwan Olkimontowicz (latinisation of the original ruthenian text)

== Sources ==
- Bartoszewicz, Julian (1863). "Holszańscy, Olszańscy (książęta).". Encyklopedyja powszechna (in Polish). Vol. Hof.-Jan.
- Frost, Robert (2015). The Oxford History of Poland-Lithuania. Vol. I: The Making of the Polish-Lithuanian Union, 1385–1569. Oxford.
- Jonynas, Ignas (1933). "Alšėniškiai". In Vaclovas Biržiška (ed.). Lietuviškoji enciklopedija (in Lithuanian). Vol. I. Kaunas: Spaudos Fondas. pp. 347–359.
- Grala, Marcin (2020). "Kilka uwag na temat politycznych okoliczności małżeństwa Wasyla Moskiewskiego i Zofii Witoldówny zawartego w 1391 roku" (PDF). Zapiski Historyczne (in Polish). 85 (1).
- Kuczyński, Stefan (1961). "Iwan Olgimuntowicz Holszański". Polski Słownik Biograficzny (in Polish). Vol. 9. Wrocław. pp. 587–588.
- Polekhov, Sergey; Butyrski, Michael (2018). "Pieczęć kniazia Iwana Olgimuntowicza Holszańskiego". Inter Regnum et Ducatum. Studia ofiarowane Profesorowi Janowi Tęgowskiemu w siedemdziesiątą rocznicę urodzin (in Polish).
- Spečiūnas, Vytautas (2004). Lietuvos valdovai (XIII-XVIII a.): enciklopedinis žinynas (in Lithuanian). Vilnius: Mokslo ir enciklopedijų leidybos institutas. ISBN 5-420-01535-8.
- Tęgowski, Jan (1996). "Przodkowie Zofii Holszańskiej, czwartej żony Władysława Jagiełły" [Ancestors of Zofia Holszańska, fourth wife of Vladislovas Jogaila]. Genealogia. Studia i materiały historyczne. (in Polish). Vol. 8. pp. 27–45.
