= Sophia of Halshany =

Queen of Poland from 1422 to 1434

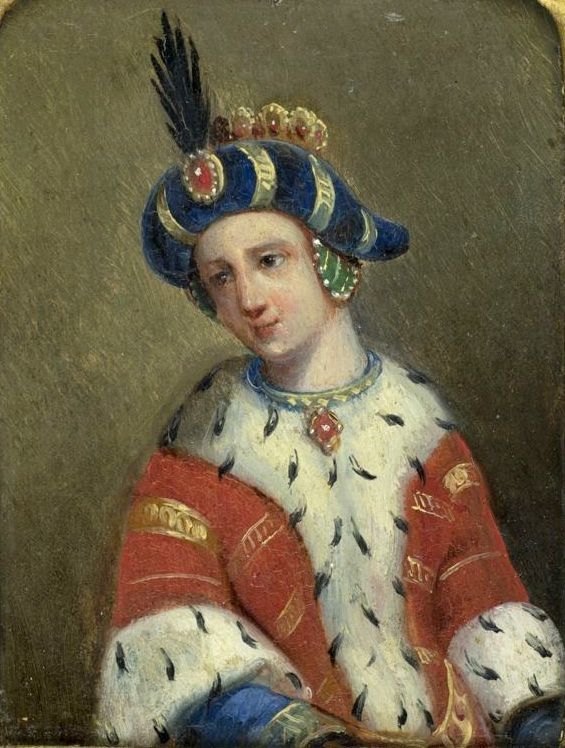
- 19th-century painting by Marceli Krajewski after a 16th-century miniature

Queen consort of Poland Grand Duchess consort of Lithuania
- Tenure: February 1422 – 1 June 1434
- Coronation: 5 March 1424
- Born: c. 1405; Grand Duchy of Lithuania
- Died: 21 September 1461 (aged 55–56); Kraków, Kingdom of Poland
- Burial: Wawel Cathedral
- Spouses: Władysław II Jagiełło
- Issue: Władysław III of Poland; Casimir; Casimir IV Jagiellon
- Dynasty: Olshanski (by birth); Jagiellon (by marriage)
- Father: Andrew Olshansky
- Mother: Alexandra Drucka
- Religion: Eastern Orthodox (by birth); Roman Catholic (by conversion)
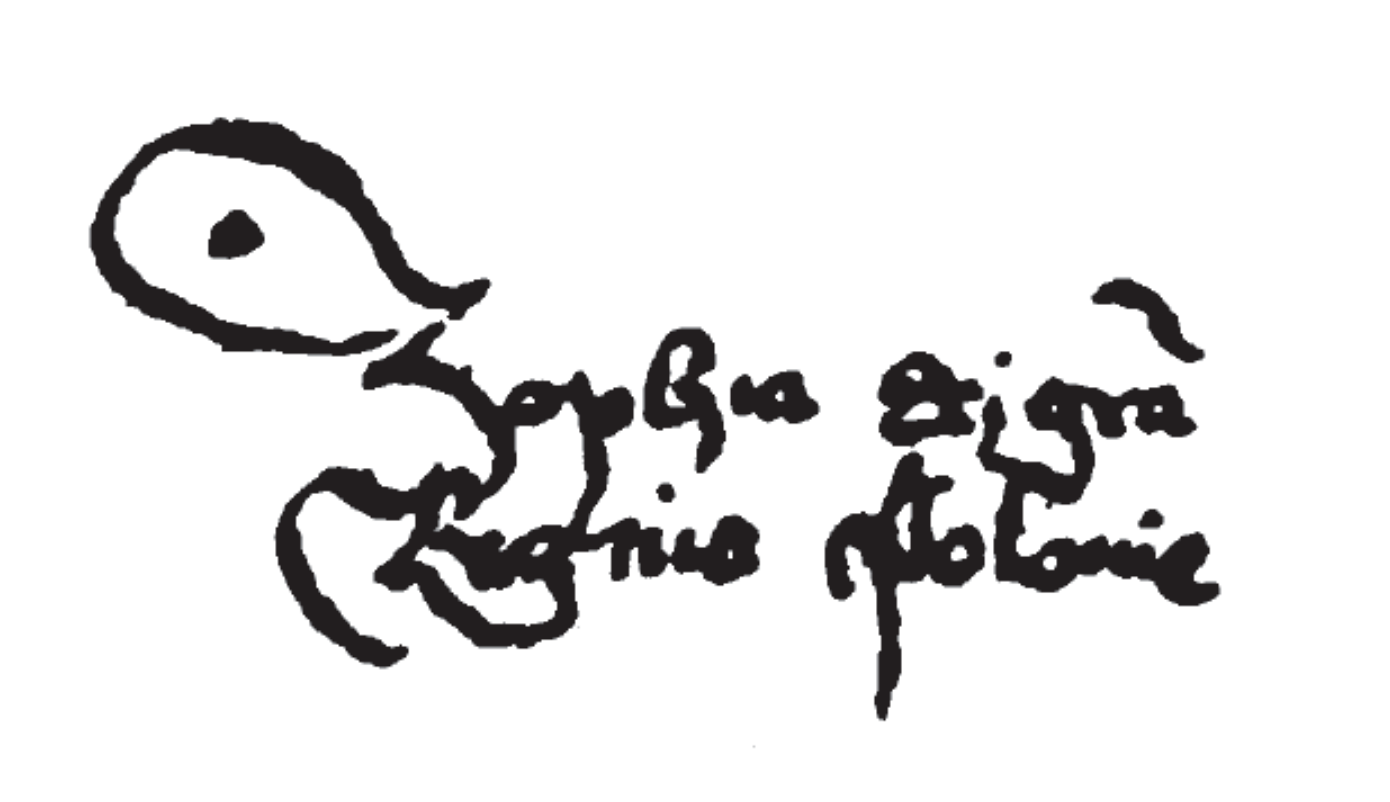
- Signature

Sophia of Halshany (c. 1405 – 21 September 1461 in Kraków), also known as Sonka, was a Queen of Poland as the fourth and last wife of Władysław II Jagiełło and a princess of the Lithuanian Alšėniškiai (Halshany) family. Although descended from a Lithuanian princely family, she was raised in a Ruthenian-speaking Orthodox environment and was described as Ruthenian in contemporary sources. She was the mother of two kings of Poland Władysław III and Casimir IV.

== Early life and marriage to Jogaila ==
Sophia was the niece of Uliana Olshanska, the wife of Vytautas, and a middle daughter of Andrew Olshansky, son of Vytautas' right-hand man Ivan Olshansky, and Alexandra Drucka, daughter of Dmitry of Druck. Historians disagree on the identity of Dmitry: Polish historiography usually provides Jogaila's half-brother Dmitry I Starshiy while Russian historians provide Dimitri Semenovich of Rurikid origin. Her father died when she was young and the family moved to Druck to live with Alexandra's brother Siemion Drucki.The family's ancestral seat was Halshany, from which their name Halshanski (Гальшанскія) derives..Sophia identified herself as Ruthenian, as evidenced by the 1436 document where she is referred to as "Sophia regina Poloniae ex genere Ruthenico" (Sophia, Queen of Poland, of Ruthenian origin). Sophia grew up in a Ruthenian environment and was an Eastern Orthodox Christian (her Orthodox name is Sophia, but her Ruthenian name was Sonya/Sonka). It is believed that she was illiterate and largely uneducated.

It is unknown when Sophia met Jogaila for the first time. It is known that they met in the winter of 1420–1421 when Jogaila visited Druck. At the time Sophia was still a teenager, while Jogaila was around 60 or 70 and widowed three times (most recently in May 1420 when Elizabeth Granowska died). He had only one surviving daughter, Hedwig Jagiellon, and no male heir. Their marriage was supported by Siemion Drucki, her uncle, and Vytautas, her aunt's husband, but opposed by Polish nobility and Sigismund, Holy Roman Emperor, who proposed marriage to his brother's widow Sophia of Bavaria.

According to a custom, it would be a disgrace if a younger sister would marry before the elder sister. Therefore, Sophia's older sister Vasilisa Olshanska was married off to Ivan Bielski, son of Jogaila's half-brother Vladimir Olgerdovich, in 1421. In February 1422, Sophia was baptized in the Roman Catholic rite (Sophia is her Catholic baptismal name). The wedding ceremony, carried out by Matthias of Trakai, Bishop of Samogitia, took place in Navahrudak on 7 or 24 February. However, her coronation as Queen of Poland took place two years later, on 5 March 1424. This delay is explained by resistance from the Polish nobility and the rather distant relationship between Sophia and Jogaila.

== Queen consort ==
=== Waiting for coronation ===
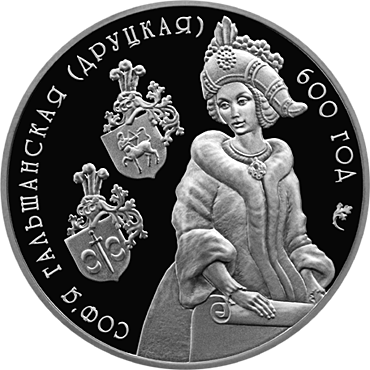
Sophia on a 20 Belarusian rubel commemorative coin of 2006

In March 1422, Sophia moved to the Wawel Castle in Kraków. There she was met with hostility by supporters of Emperor Sigismund and Princess Hedwig, particularly Zbigniew Oleśnicki, the Tęczyński and Tarnowski families. For a year, the couple spent time mostly apart: Jogaila travelled to Prussia for the Gollub War, to Lithuania to spend the winter, to Hungary for negotiations with Emperor Sigismund while Sophia stayed in Kraków. Alone in a foreign and hostile court, Sophia wrote letters to Jogaila expressing her unhappiness.

Only in April 1423, Jogaila took Sophia on a trip to Russia. It is likely that the relationship grew closer during that journey as Jogaila took active steps to have Sophia crowned as the queen by Archbishop of Gniezno Wojciech Jastrzębiec. Coronation festivities in March 1424 lasted five days. Sophia received the villages of Stara Zagość and Bogucice Pierwsze as well as 20,000 grzywnas of Prague groschen.

=== Children ===
On the night of 30–31 October 1424 she gave birth to Władysław III of Poland, the first male heir born in Poland in 114 years. The son substantially raised Sophia's prestige and political influence in Poland. The parents soon became engulfed in a political power struggle to ensure Władysław's succession. Polish nobility claimed that Jogaila's claim to the throne was not hereditary and that a new king should be elected by the nobles. Congresses in Brest (April 1425) and Łęczyca (May 1426), the nobles declared that Władysław would inherit only if he confirmed certain noble freedoms and refused the proposal for Sophia's regency. Jogaila disagreed with such a decision and continued to campaign.

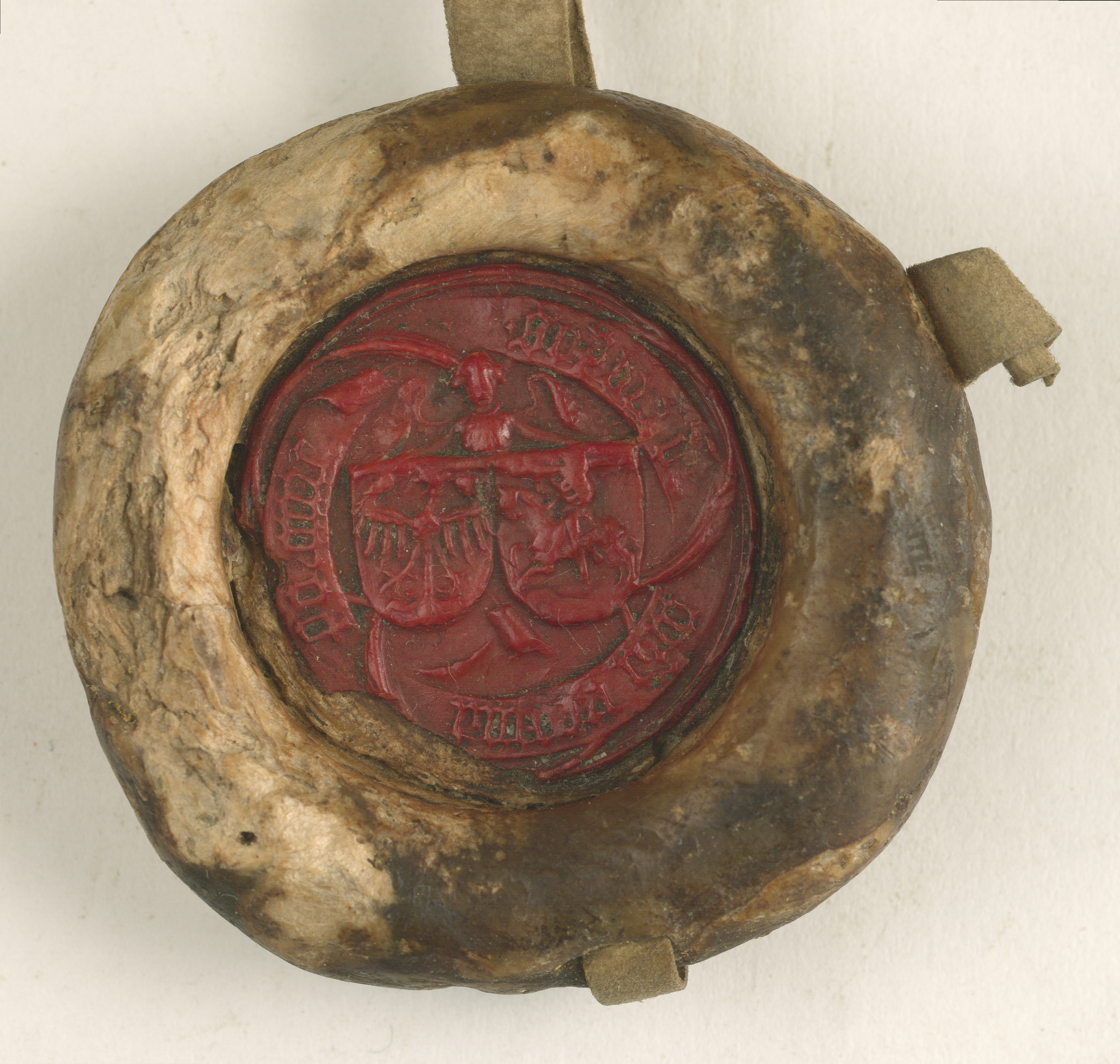
Seal of Sophia from a 1435 document

On 16 May 1426, in Krakow, Sophia gave birth to Casimir, the second son of Jogaila. However, the boy died on 2 March 1427. These dates, provided in historical sources, contradict a 1950 study of Casimir's skeleton which found that the bones are of an approximately 18-month-old boy.

In spring 1427, while pregnant with the third child, Sophia was accused of marital infidelity, therefore casting doubt over Władysław's and yet-unborn Casimir's paternity. Two of her servants were arrested and tortured and seven men were named as Sophia's lovers: treasurer Hińcza of Rogów, Piotr Kurowski, Wawrzyniec Zaręba, Jan Kraska, Jan Koniecpolski, brothers Piotr and Dobiesław of Szczekociny. The case went before a court. After the birth of her third son, Sophia took an oath before the court that she was innocent and the case was dismissed. Despite the scandal which dragged on for several months, the paternity of Sophia's children was never questioned again. On 29 or 30 November 1427, Sophia gave birth to Casimir IV Jagiellon.

=== Securing succession ===
The royal couple continued to work to assure their sons' rights to the Polish throne. In the autumn of 1428, the couple travelled to Lithuania, perhaps to support the plan to obtain the royal crown of Lithuania from Grand Duke Vytautas. Elderly Vytautas had no heir and his crown would have passed to Jogaila and his sons. If Polish nobles wanted to preserve the Polish–Lithuanian union, they would be forced to elect Jogaila's sons to the Polish throne. Historians summed up this strategy as "through hereditary Lithuania to hereditary Poland."

However, the plan was vehemently opposed by Polish nobles while Vytautas insisted on being crowned. In the end, Jogaila caved in. During a congress in Jedlnia in March 1430, he accepted the nobility's declaration that Władysław would inherit only if he confirmed certain privileges for the nobility and that Sophia would not be a regent. Vytautas died in October 1430. Succession disputes in Lithuania led to the Lithuanian Civil War (1431–35) and Polish–Teutonic War (1431–35). That collapsed the strategy to secure hereditary rights in Poland through Lithuania and, in January 1433, Jogaila confirmed resolutions of the congress in Jedlnia. The Polish kings, even from the same dynasty, had to be elected by the nobles.

In December 1431, Princess Hedwig Jagiellon, betrothed to Frederick II, Elector of Brandenburg, died of a year-long illness. Sophia was accused of poisoning her stepdaughter to remove her from succession disputes. Again, Sophia had to give an oath professing her innocence.

== Queen mother ==
=== King Władysław III ===
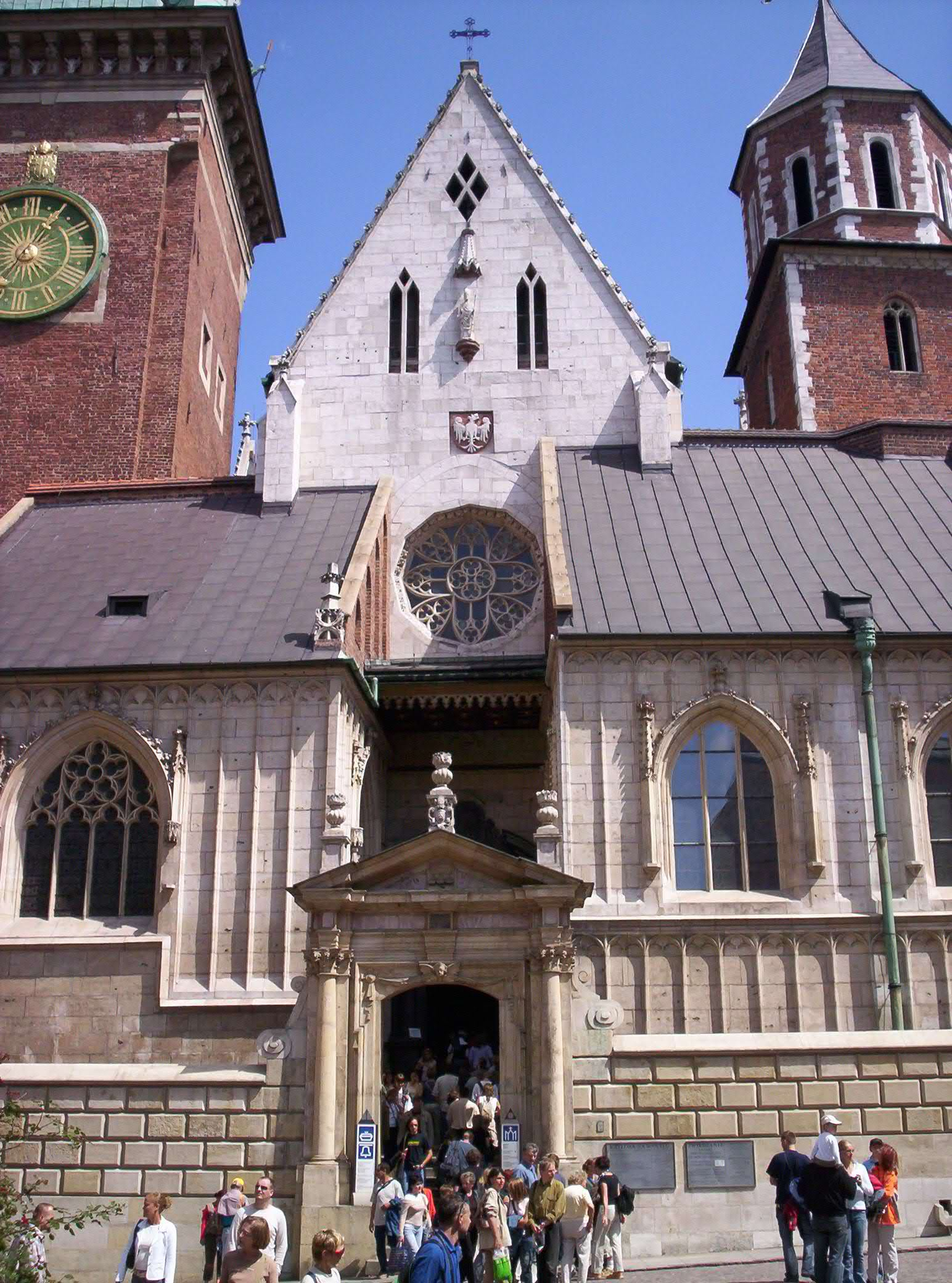
Queen Sophia's Chapel (left) of the Wawel Cathedral, funded by Sophia in 1431–1432

On 1 June 1434 Jogaila died in Horodok. The power was seized by Bishop Zbigniew Oleśnicki and his supporters. On 25 July 1434, following the decisions of the Jedlnia congress, ten-year-old Władysław III of Poland was crowned as the King of Poland. The regency was entrusted to the royal council, and not directly to either Sophia or Oleśnicki who continued to struggle for influence in the council.

In the summer of 1435, Sophia helped Iliaș of Moldavia, the husband of her youngest sister, escape a Polish prison and regain power in Moldavia. Iliaș swore fealty to Władysław and Moldavia paid a tribute to Poland. She also supported a project to betroth Władysław and Anne, Duchess of Luxembourg, who was at the time heiress to the Kingdom of Hungary and Bohemia. However, the project fell through.

After the death of Sigismund, Holy Roman Emperor, Bohemian nobility, mainly Hussites opposing Albert of Austria, elected Casimir IV Jagiellon as their king in March 1438 in Chrudim. It is not known whether Sophia took any action to facilitate this election, but she was generally supportive of the Hussites while Oleśnicki strongly opposed them. In fall 1438, Polish army invaded Bohemia. However, the campaign was poorly organized and, after the defeat of Casimir's supporters in Želenice, the army returned to Poland in October 1438. In December 1438, Polish nobles gathered in Piotrków Trybunalski and proclaimed 14-year-old Władysław to have attained the age of majority. That officially dissolved the regency but did not strengthen Sophia's position against Oleśnicki. She actively took part in organizing a confederation "for protection of the king and order in the kingdom," which opposed Oleśnicki and supported Hussites, in Nowy Korczyn. The confederation, led by Spytek of Melsztyn, was defeated in the Battle of Grotniki.

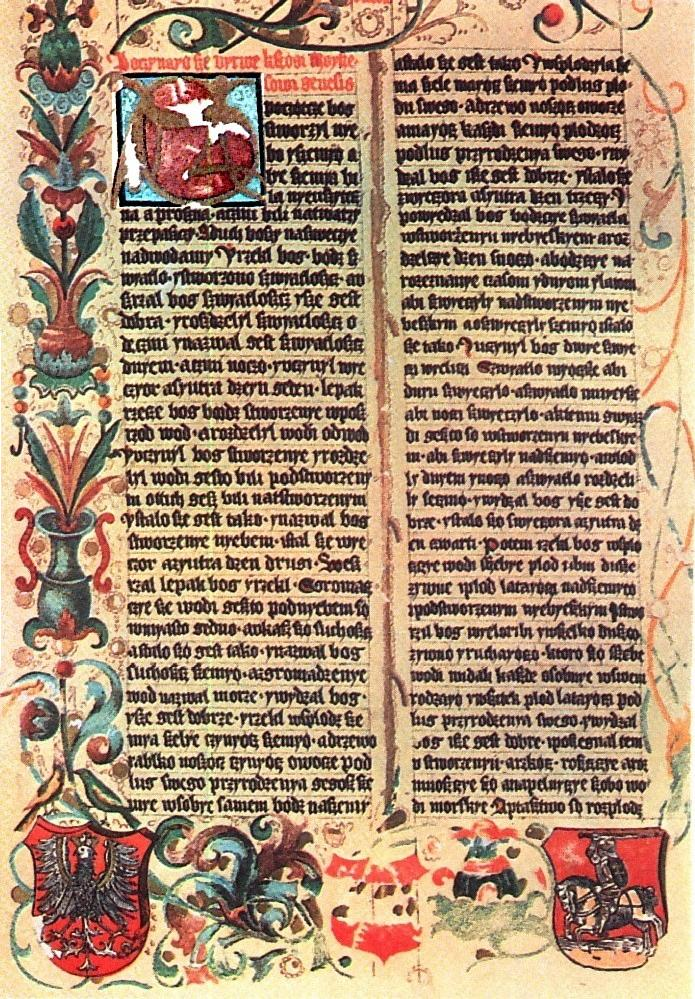
Bible of Queen Sophia

After the death of Albert in October 1439, Hungarian nobles elected Władysław as their king. Sophia escorted Władysław to the Hungarian border. They said goodbye on 22 April 1440 in Czorsztyn. It was the last time Sophia saw her eldest son. In March 1440, Sigismund Kęstutaitis, Grand Duke of Lithuania, was murdered. With Władysław in Hungary, Lithuanian nobles, led by Jonas Goštautas, invited Casimir to Vilnius and elected him as the Grand Duke. Sophia remained in Poland and devoted the next four years to the Sanok Land and Sanok Castle. Reportedly, she was a capable administrator and earned respect from local residents. However, income from the land did not support her royal lifestyle and she accumulated some debts.

=== King Casimir IV ===
Władysław was killed in the Battle of Varna on 10 November 1444. The news propelled Sophia back into national politics. In April 1445, she participated in the congress in Sieradz where Polish nobles elected Casimir as their king. However, Casimir was not eager to claim the throne and refused to travel to Poland. Sophia travelled to Lithuania where she met Casimir, after a separation of five years, in Hrodna in October 1445. Casimir refused to come to Poland and for the next two years, Sophia acted as an intermediary between Casimir and Polish nobles. In 1446, Polish nobles selected Bolesław IV of Warsaw as their king if Casimir refused. Sophia once again sent envoys to her son who finally agreed to become the king. According to Jan Długosz, Sophia's motherly pleas convinced nobles to confirm Casimir as their king in Nowy Korczyn despite Oleśnicki's support to Bolesław. On 25 June 1447 Casimir was crowned King of Poland.

As the new king, Casimir isolated Oleśnicki from power but allowed Sophia to participate in the royal council. She accompanied Casimir in his travels and continued to influence his decisions. Casimir supported Sophia's nephews, Roman II and Alexăndrel of Moldavia. Her influence decreased significantly after Casimir married Elisabeth of Austria in 1454. Her last known political action was sending an envoy to newly elected Pope Pius II to find out his opinions on the Polish–Teutonic War (1454–66).

According to Długosz, Sophia became ill after eating too many melons and refused treatment. The illness worsened and she was paralyzed. She died on 21 September 1461. She was buried in the Holy Trinity Chapel of the Wawel Cathedral. She had funded the construction and decoration of the chapel in 1431–1432. At the time of her death, she had four grandsons and one granddaughter.

Sophia sponsored a translation of the Bible into the Polish language (1453–1461). Even though the translation was not completed, the work, known as Bible of Queen Sophia, is an important monument of the Polish language.

Memorial stone in Halshany dedicated to Sophia of Halshany (2006).

In 2006, a memorial stone with a bronze bas-relief of Sophia was unveiled in Halshany to commemorate the 600th anniversary of her birth. The inscription on the monument, in Belarusian, reads: "To Sophia of Halshany, daughter of the Belarusian land, ancestress of the Jagiellonian dynasty."

== See also ==
- Media related to Sophia of Halshany at Wikimedia Commons

== Bibliography ==
- Duczmal, Małgorzata (2012). Jogailaičiai (PDF) (in Lithuanian). Translated by Birutė Mikalonienė and Vyturys Jarutis. Vilnius: Mokslo ir enciklopedijų leidybos centras. ISBN 978-5-420-01703-6. Archived from the original (PDF) on 5 March 2016.
- Frost, Robert (2015). The Making of the Polish-Lithuanian Union 1385-1569. Oxford History of Early Modern Europe. Vol. I. Oxford University Press. ISBN 9780191017872.
- Tęgowski, Jan (1999). Pierwsze pokolenia Giedyminowiczow (in Polish). Poznań-Wrocław: Wydawn. Historyczne. ISBN 83-913563-1-0.
- Wdowiszewski, Zygmunt (1968). Genealogia Jagiellonów (in Polish). Warszawa: Pax. OCLC 21868459.
- Nosevich, Viacheslav L. (2000). "Друцкае княства і князі Друцкія". Друцк старажытны: Да 1000-годдзя ўзнікнення горада (in Belarusian). Minsk: Belarusian Encyclopedia. ISBN 9789851101852. Archived from the original on 21 June 2007.

Sophia of Halshany Olshanski Born: c. 1405 Died: 21 September 1461
Royal titles
Preceded by Elizabeth Granowska	Queen consort of Poland; 1424–1434	Succeeded by Elizabeth of Austria
Previous: Uliana of Halshany and Elizabeth Granowska	Grand Duchess consort of Lithuania; 1424–1434 with Uliana of Halshany and Anne of Tver	Next: Elizabeth of Austria
