= Semyon Olshanski =

- Grand Hetman of Lithuania
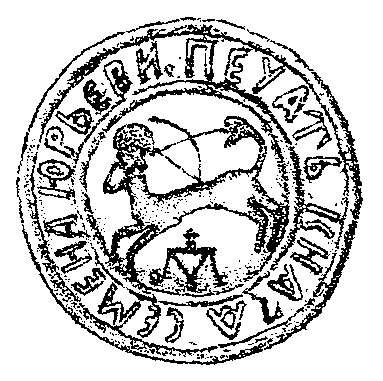
- Seal of Olshanski featuring Hipocentaur
- Died: 1505/1506
- Noble family: Olshanski
- Issue: Tatiana Koretska
- Father: Yuri Olshanski

Prince Semyon Yurievich of Halshany (Belarusian: Сямён Юр’евіч Гальшанскі; Lithuanian: Simonas Juravičius Alšėniškis; died in 1505 or 1506) was a noble from the Olshanski family in the Grand Duchy of Lithuania.

Olshanski first appeared in politics as Grand Duke's marshal in 1488. Two years later he became starosta of Lutsk and successfully defended Volhynia from the Tatar invasion during the Polish–Ottoman War (1485–1503). He commanded the army in the victorious Battle of Zasław in January 1491 and was promoted to Marshal of Volhynia. In 1495, sons of Khan Meñli I Giray invaded Volhynia and Olshanski successfully defended the besieged Korets. Next year, the Tatars invaded again and attacked Rivne where Olshanski and Konstanty Ostrogski were hiding. They rode out to attack the invaders but had to retreat once the main Tatar forces arrived. The invaders burned the city but did not manage to capture the castle.

When his son-in-law Konstanty Ostrogski was captured in the Battle of Vedrosha in July 1500, Olshanski became the Great Hetman (commander of the army) of the Grand Duchy of Lithuania. Grand Duke brokered alliances with the Livonian Order and Great Horde, but the Lithuanian army did not organize more active defense and Olshanski was replaced by Stanislovas Kęsgaila in 1501 or 1502.

Jan Litawor Chreptowicz, regent of Navahrudak, was also taken captive at Vedrosha. He was married to Hedwig Olshanska, Semyon's niece, and Olshanski took over Navahrudak. Here as well he was soon replaced by Piotr Hlebowicz. However, he was able to hold the title of starosta of Kremenets from early 1501 until his death in 1505 or 1506. In 1502, Olshanski returned to Volhynia and once again organized defense against the Crimean Khanate that attacked Babruysk, Turov, and Brest.
