= July 6 (Eastern Orthodox liturgics) =

Day in the Eastern Orthodox liturgical calendar

Eastern Orthodox liturgical calendar
| July 5 | July 6 | July 7 |
July 6 O.S. ≍ July 19 N.S. July 6 N.S ≍ June 23 O.S.

An Eastern Orthodox cross

July 6 in Eastern Orthodox liturgical calendars is a feast day and a day of commemoration of saints and martyrs. Although some Orthodox churches use the Revised Julian Calendar and others use the traditional Julian calendar, the fixed commemorations for their respective July 6 are broadly the same, no matter which calendar is used. (Note: Despite the dates being the same, the days to which they refer typically differ by 13 days. The notation Old Style or O.S. is sometimes used to indicate a date in the traditional Julian Calendar (the "Old Calendar"). The notation New Style or N.S. indicates a date in the Revised Julian calendar (the "New Calendar").)

== Saints ==
- Apostles of the Seventy Archippus, Philemon, and Onesimus (1st century)
- Hieromartyr Asteius, Bishop of Dyrrachium in Macedonia (c. 100)
- Martyrs Marinus and Martha, their children Audifax and Abbacum (Habakkuk), and those with them at Rome (269): (see also: January 19 - West )

- Cyrinus, the priest Valentine, and Asterius

- Saint Cointus of Phrygia (Quintus), Confessor and Wonderworker (c. 283)
- Hieromartyr Isaurus the Deacon, and Martyrs Innocent, Felix, Hermias, Basil, Peregrinus, Rufus, and Rufinus, of Apollonia in Macedonia (284) (see also: June 17)
- Virgin-martyr Lucy of Campania, Martyr Rixius the Imperial Vicar, 24 others beheaded with them, and many other martyrs in Campania, including (301): (Note: "The same day, St. Lucia, martyr, a native of Campania. Being arrested and severely tortured by the lieutenant-governor Rictiovarus, she converted him to Christ. To them were added Antoninus, Severinus, Diodorus, Dion, and seventeen others, who shared their sufferings and their crowns.")

- Anthony, Lucian, Isidore, Dion, Diodorus, Cutonius, Arnosus, Capicus, Satyrus, and others.

- Martyrs Apollonius, Alexandrion, and Epimachus.
- Martyr Basil and 69 other martyrs of Scythopolis. (see also: June 28 )
- Venerable Sisoës the Great of Egypt (429)

== Pre-Schism Western saints ==
- Saint Romulus of Fiesole and Companions, ordained by the Apostle Peter as first pastor of Fiesole, he was martyred with several companions under Domitian (c. 90) (Note: "At Fiesoli, in Tuscany, St. Romulus, bishop and martyr, disciple of the blessed apostle Peter, who commissioned him to preach the Gospel. After announcing Christ in many parts of Italy, he returned to Fiesoli, and was crowned with martyrdom with other Christians in the reign of Domitian.")
- Saint Tranquillinus, a martyr in Rome connected with St Sebastian (c. 288) (Note: "At Rome, the birthday of St. Tranquillinus, martyr, father of the Saints Mark and Marcellian, who were converted to Christ by the preaching of the martyr St. Sebastian. Baptized by the blessed priest Polycarp, he was ordained priest by pope St. Caius. He was arrested while praying at the tomb of blessed Paul on the Octave of the Apostles, and stoned to death by the Pagans, and thus consummated his martyrdom.")
- Saint Dominica, a martyr venerated in Campania who suffered under Diocletian. (Note: "In Campania, St. Dominica, virgin and martyr, in the time of the emperor Diocletian. For having destroyed idols, she was condemned to the beasts, but being uninjured by them, she was beheaded and departed for heaven. Her body is kept with great veneration at Tropea, in Calabria.")
- Saint Monenna (or Darerca), an ascetic and Abbess of Sliabh Cuillin in Ireland, foundress of Killeevy Monastery (c. 518) (Note: "S. Monynna, or Darerca, is said to have received the veil from the hands of S. Patrick, near the pool of Bruigis. She proceeded to associate others with herself, eight virgins, and a widow with her little boy, named Luger, who afterwards became a bishop. They built a church at Roskerry, near Carlingford. Then she removed with her nuns to S. Ibar (d. 500), in the western isles of Ireland, and remained for some time under his direction, first there, and afterwards in an island in the south, called Little Ireland (Beg-Erin), in Wexford harbour. She made the acquaintance of, and often visited, S. Bridget, and is said to have established herself at a distance of four days' journey from that holy woman. She next retired into a cell where she could not see the face of a man, only going out at night. Her church is now called Killevy, near Newry.") (Note: Foundress of a number of monasteries in Scotland and England.)
- Saint Goar of Aquitaine, Hieromonk, hermit, and missionary along the Rhine, Germany (649) (Note: A priest from Aquitaine in France, who lived as a hermit near Oberwesel on the Rhine in Germany, now called St Goar.) (Note: "In the vicinity of Treves, St. Goar, priest and confessor.")
- Saint Seaxburh of Ely (Saxburgh, Sexburga), foundress of the abbey at Minster-in-Sheppey and later Abbess of Ely (699) (Note: Daughter of Anna, King of East Anglia in England, sister of Sts Etheldred, Ethelburgh and Withburgh and half-sister of St Sethrid. She married Erconbert, King of Kent, and so became mother of Sts Ermenhild and Ercongota. As Queen she founded the convent of Minster in Sheppey. Widowed in 664, she became a nun there, later moving to Ely in 679, where she became abbess.)
- Saint Noyala, a holy virgin from Britain beheaded at Beignan in Brittany. (Note: "According to the popular belief in Brittany, unsupported by any evidence, S. Noaluen or S. Noyala the White, was a British maiden, who floated over to Brittany with her nurse on the leaf of a tree. She was decapitated at Beignan, and walked to Pontivy holding her head in her hands. The chapel dedicated to her at Pontivy was remarkable in the 18th cent. for several interesting paintings on gold grounds representing this fanciful story.")

== Post-Schism Orthodox saints ==
- Venerable Sisoes of the Kiev Caves, Schemamonk of the Kiev Caves (13th century)
- New Monk-martyr Cyril of Hilandar, Mt. Athos, burned alive at Thessalonica (1566)
- Saint Barnabas, Elder, of the Gethsemane Skete of St. Sergius Lavra (1906)
- Venerable Dometie (Manolache) the Merciful of Râmeț, Archimandrite (1975) (Note: See: (in Romanian) Dometie Manolache. Wikipedia. (Romanian Wikipedia).)
- Saint Filotimia Manolache, Nun from Râmeț Monastery, mother of Venerable Dometie the Merciful of Râmeț (1989) (Note: See: (in Romanian) Filotimia Manolache. Wikipedia. (Romanian Wikipedia).)

=== New martyrs and confessors ===
- New Hieromartyr Euthymius (Lyubovichev), Hieromonk of Optina Monastery (1931) (Note: See also: (in Russian) Евфимий (Любовичев). Википедии. (Russian Wikipedia).)
- New Hieromartyr Theodore (Bogoyavlensky), Hieromonk, of Vostryakovo, Moscow (1943)

== Other commemorations ==
- Translation of the relics of Saint Eudocimus of Cappadocia (9th century) (Note: His feast day is on July 31.)
- Uncovering of the relics of St. Juliana, Princess of Olshansk (16th century) (Note: See also: (in Russian) Иулиания Ольшанская. Википедии. (Russian Wikipedia).) (see also: October 10 - Saints of Volhynia)
- Synaxis of the Saints of Radonezh. (Note: See also: (in Russian) Собор Радонежских святых. Википедии. (Russian Wikipedia).)
- "Bogorodsko-Ufimsky" Icon of the Mother of God (1621) (Note: See also: (in Russian) Богородско-Уфимская икона Божией Матери. Википедии. (Russian Wikipedia).)
- Repose of Archimandrite Arsenius (Papacioc) of Romania (2011) (Note: See also: (in Romanian) Arsenie Papacioc. Wikipedia (Romanian Wikipedia).)

== Icon gallery ==
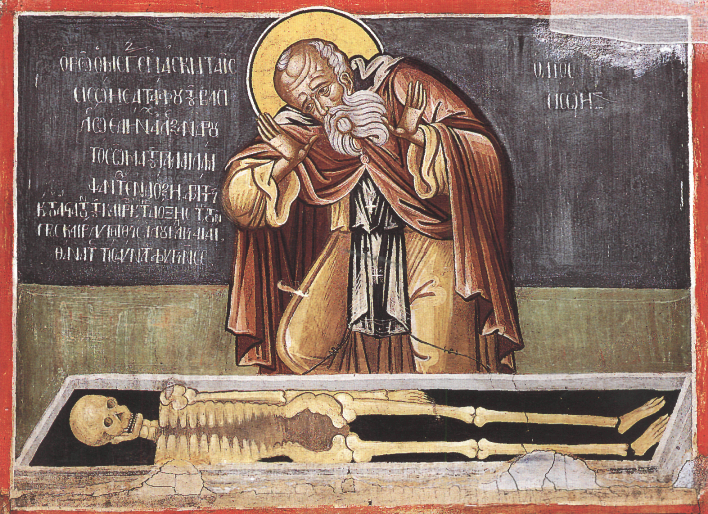
Venerable Sisoës the Great, before the tomb of Alexander the Great, signifying the remembrance of death.

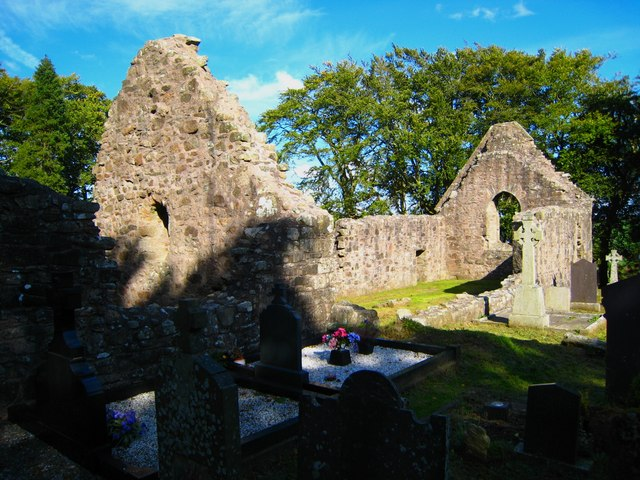
Killevy Old Church, reputed site of St. Monenna's convent.

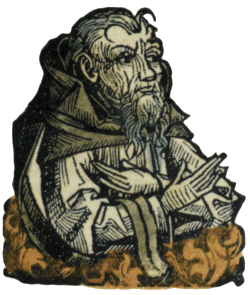
St. Goar of Aquitaine (from the Nuremberg Chronicle).

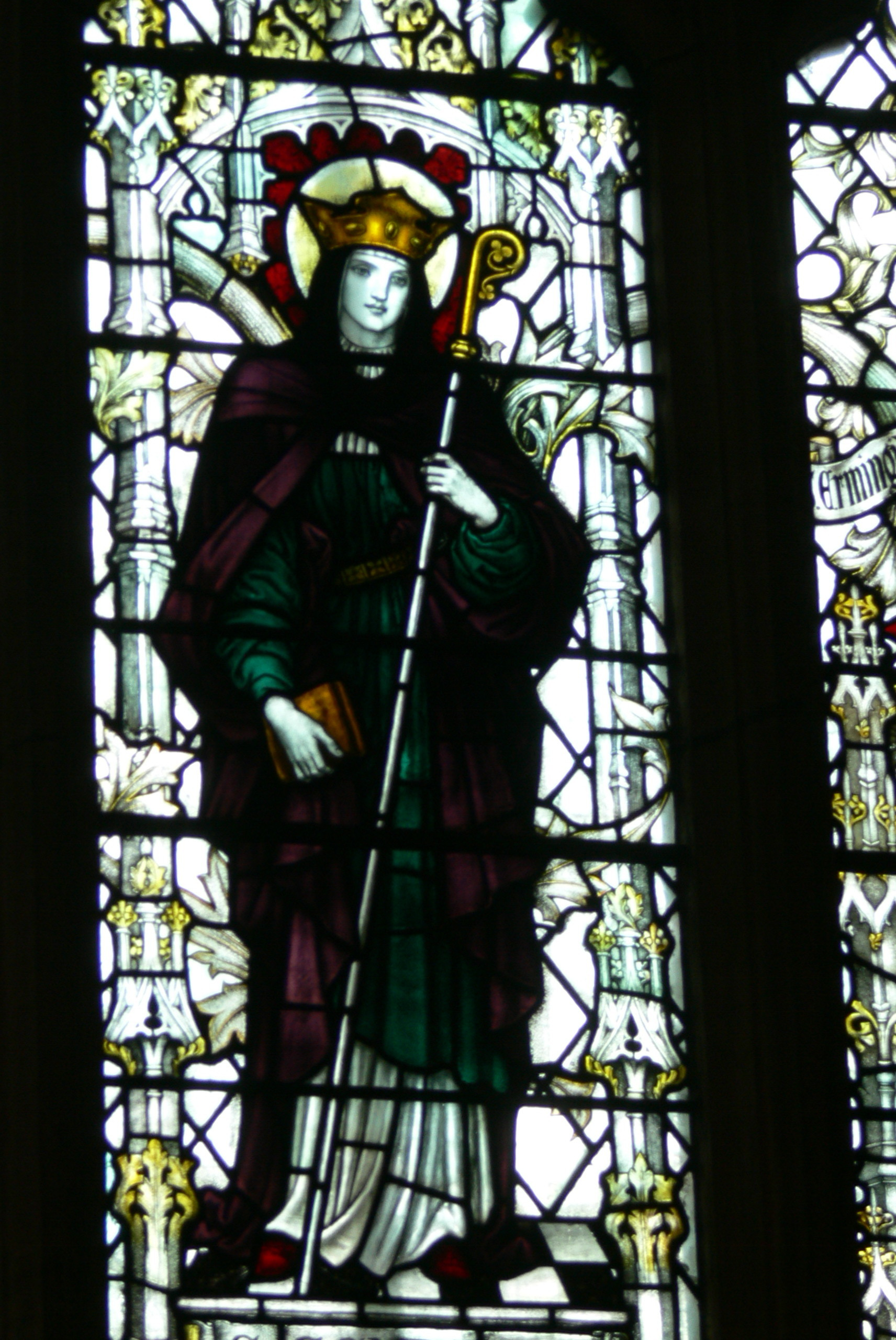
St. Seaxburh of Ely.

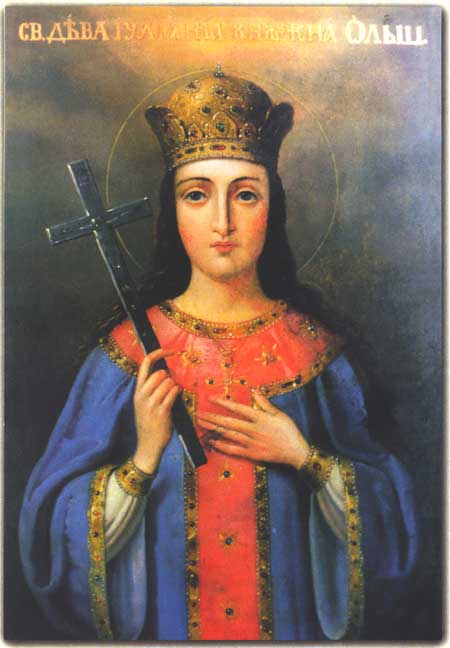
St. Juliana Olshanskaya.

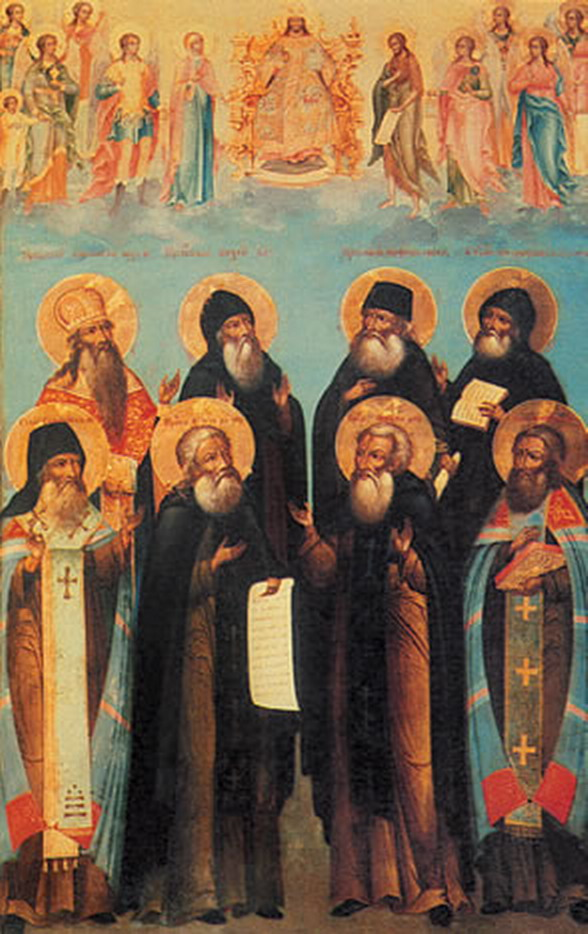
'Synaxis of the Saints of Radonezh.

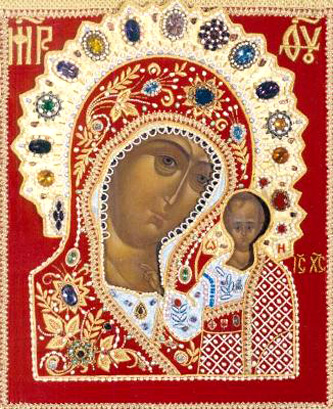
Icon of the Mother of God 'Ufimskaya'.

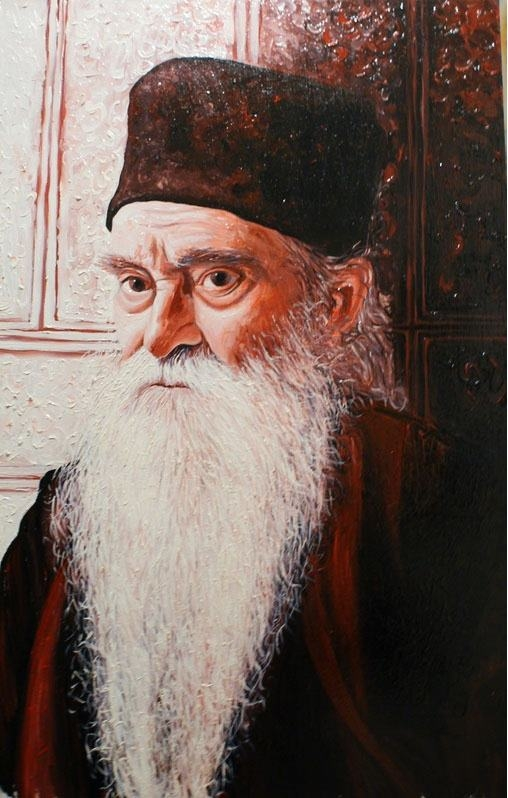
Archimandrite Arsenius (Papacioc) of Romania.

== Sources ==
- July 6/July 19. Orthodox Calendar (PRAVOSLAVIE.RU).
- July 19 / July 6. HOLY TRINITY RUSSIAN ORTHODOX CHURCH (A parish of the Patriarchate of Moscow).
- July 6. OCA - The Lives of the Saints.
- July 6. The Year of Our Salvation - Holy Transfiguration Monastery, Brookline, Massachusetts.
- The Autonomous Orthodox Metropolia of Western Europe and the Americas (ROCOR). St. Hilarion Calendar of Saints for the year of our Lord 2004. St. Hilarion Press (Austin, TX). p. 50.
- The Sixth Day of the Month of July. Orthodoxy in China.
- July 6. Latin Saints of the Orthodox Patriarchate of Rome.
- The Roman Martyrology. Transl. by the Archbishop of Baltimore. Last Edition, According to the Copy Printed at Rome in 1914. Revised Edition, with the Imprimatur of His Eminence Cardinal Gibbons. Baltimore: John Murphy Company, 1916. pp. 196–197.
- Rev. Richard Stanton. A Menology of England and Wales, or, Brief Memorials of the Ancient British and English Saints Arranged According to the Calendar, Together with the Martyrs of the 16th and 17th Centuries. London: Burns & Oates, 1892. pp. 313–316.

Greek Sources

- Great Synaxaristes: (in Greek) 6 ΙΟΥΛΙΟΥ. ΜΕΓΑΣ ΣΥΝΑΞΑΡΙΣΤΗΣ.
- (in Greek) Συναξαριστής. 6 Ιουλίου. ECCLESIA.GR. (H ΕΚΚΛΗΣΙΑ ΤΗΣ ΕΛΛΑΔΟΣ).
- (in Greek) ΙΟΥΛΙΟΣ. Αποστολική Διακονία της Εκκλησίας της Ελλάδος (Apostoliki Diakonia of the Church of Greece).
- (in Greek) 06/07/2018. Ορθόδοξος Συναξαριστής.

Russian Sources

- (in Russian) 19 июля (6 июля). Православная Энциклопедия под редакцией Патриарха Московского и всея Руси Кирилла (электронная версия). (Orthodox Encyclopedia - Pravenc.ru).
- (in Russian) 6 июля по старому стилю / 19 июля по новому стилю. Русская Православная Церковь - Православный церковный календарь на 2018 год.
- (in Russian) 6 июля (ст.ст.) 19 июля 2014 (нов. ст.). Русская Православная Церковь Отдел внешних церковных связей. (DECR).
