= Rokantiškės Castle =

Castle in Rokantiškės, Lithuania

- Rokantiškės pilis (Lithuanian)
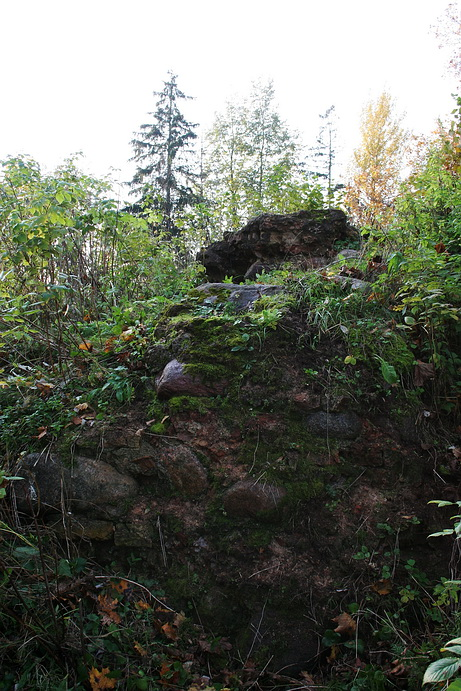
- Rokantiškės Castle remains
- Interactive map of Rokantiškės Castle
- 54.690°N 25.391°E
- Type: Castle and residential manor
- Location: Vilnius, Lithuania

History
- Built: 12th century (original), 16th century (rebuilt)
- Demolished: 7 August 1655

Site notes
- Architectural style: Renaissance
- Current use: Ruin

Rokantiškės Castle (Lithuanian: Rokantiškių pilis) ruins are in Naujoji Vilnia elderate of Vilnius, Lithuania.

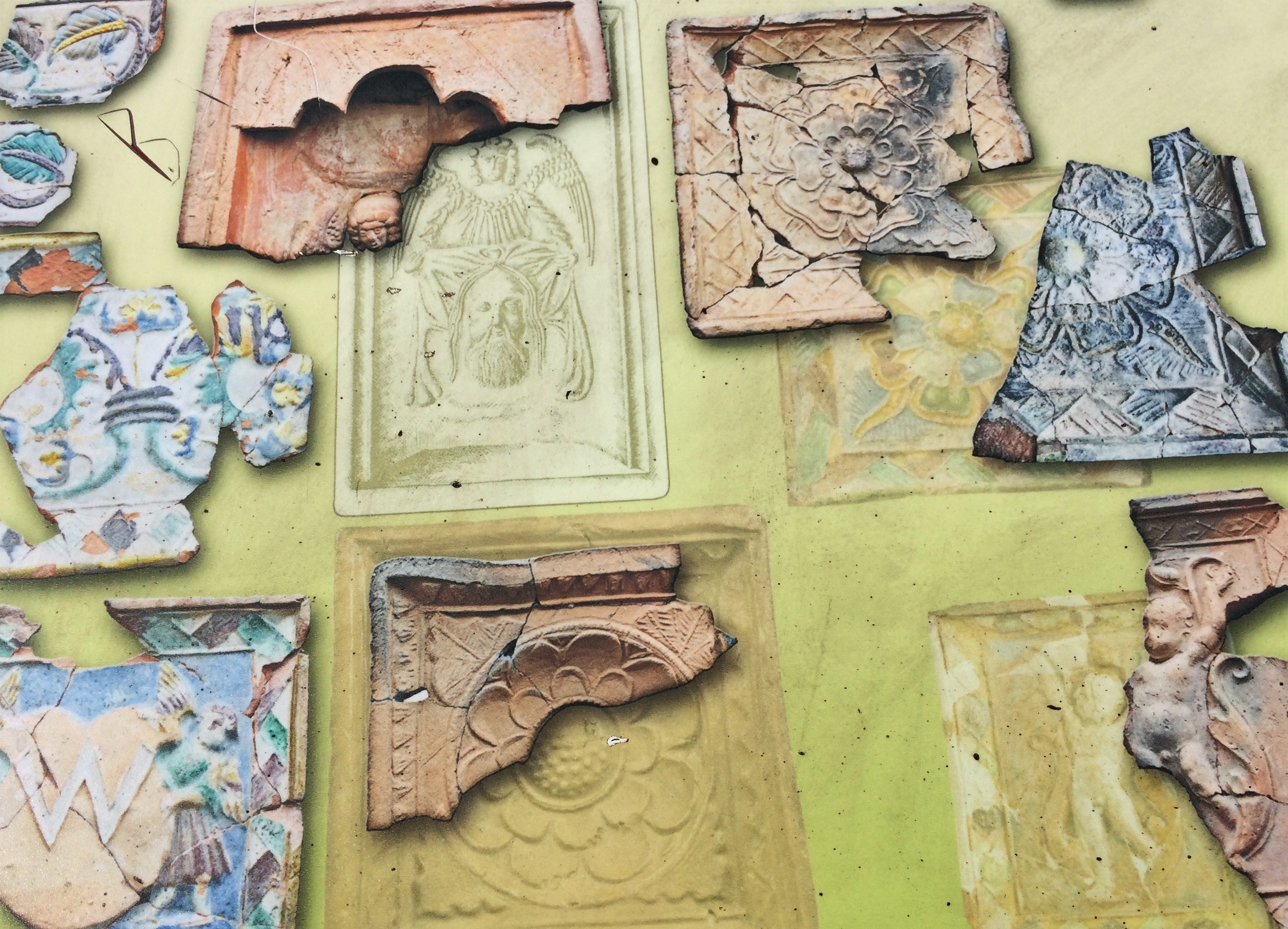
Archaeological findings of the castle

The castle was located east of Vilnius on a high hill near the Vilnia River. The first castle was built in the 12th century. In the 16th century, it was rebuilt in the Renaissance style and has been the seat of the Olshanski family. Alexander Olshanski, Yuri Olshanski and the last family member Pawel Olshanski have lived there. After his death the castle was inherited by Bona Sforza and later passed to the Pac family. The Deputy Chancellor of Lithuania Stefan Pac was visited here by the King of Poland and Grand duke of Lithuania Władysław IV Vasa on July 15, 1636.

The castle was burnt down by Cossacks on 7 August 1655, during the Russo-Polish War and fell in ruins. Today there are the only visible medieval castle ruins in Vilnius.

== See also ==
- List of castles in Lithuania
