= Bohdan Pawłowicz Sapieha =

Lithuanian noble

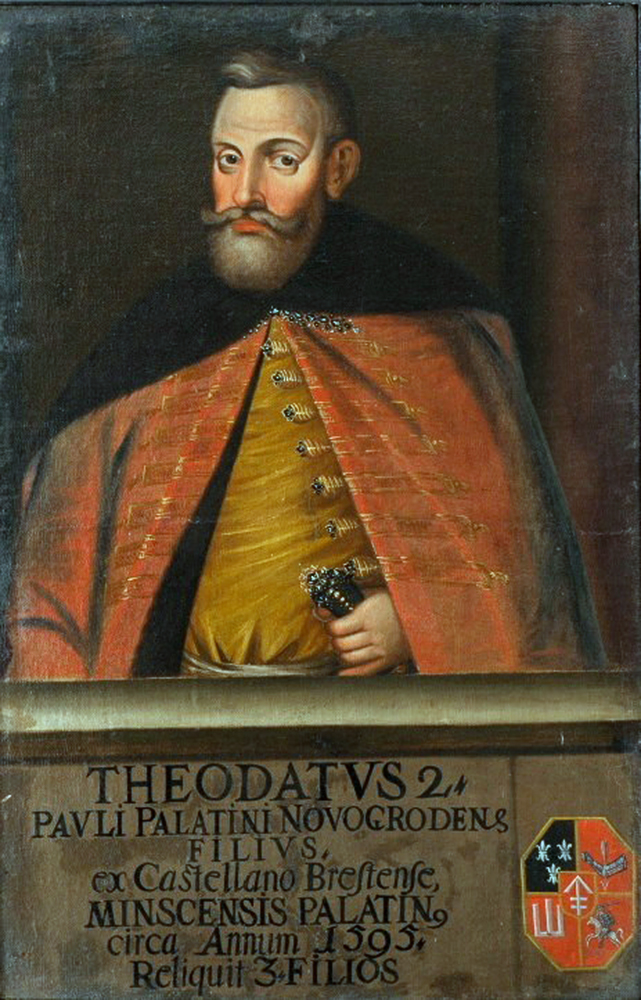
Bohdan Pawłowicz Sapieha

Bohdan Pawłowicz Sapieha (died 1593), a.k.a. Bohdan Sapieha of Boćki was a dignitary from Sapieha family in Grand Duchy of Lithuania. He was podkomorzy of Bielsk, starosta of Homiel, castellan of Brest and later of Smolensk, and voivode of Minsk.

He was son of Paweł Iwanowicz Sapieha and Olena Holszańska.

== Marriage and children ==
Bohdan Pawłowicz Sapieha married Maryna Kapusta. Their children are:

- Mikolaj (1558-1638)
- Andrzej (†1610)
- Pawel Stefan (1565-1635)
- Zofia (Agata)
- Raina
- Barbara (Wasylisa)
