= Hipocentaur coat of arms =

Polish–Lithuanian coat of arms

Hipocentaur
- Battle cry: -
- Alternative names: Hippocentaurus, Hipocentaurus, Hipocentaur, Kitaurus
- Earliest mention: unknown
- Towns: Halshany, Staryja Darohi, Siesikai, Lutomiersk
- Families: Aleksandowicz, Bachcza, Bachuz, Bortko, Dannemark, Dorszprung, Dowmont, Dubrawski, Dubrowicki or Dubrownicki, Dydziel or Dydziul, Ejmuntowicz, Eymuntowicz, Gałagan, Giecewicz, Gieczewski, Giedgowt, Giedowt, Giedroyć (Giedraičiai), Giedruś, Giezgowt, Ginwił(ł), Gogul, Goitus, Gojtus, Hornostaj(ski), Hurynowicz, Jamont(owicz), Jurażyc, Kamieński, Katank, Konjugowicz, Kozłowicz, Kulwiec, Kulwieć, Lebiedziowski, Lickiewicz, Lutyn, Mickiewicz, Micko(wicz), Mieciecki, Mieciński, Mizgayłło, Nielub, Ostyk(owicz), Olshanski (Holszański), Paliszewski, Płaskowski, Polewicz, Polewicz-Jamont, Pukielewicz, Rakiewicz, Rodkiewicz, Rukiewicz, Rukowicz, Rutkiewicz-Dowmont, Ruykiewicz, Siesicki, Sołomiej(y), Strawiński, Suchta, Szawelski, Szemiot, Szerejko(wicz), Szolomicki, Świrski, Talmont(owicz), Trabski, Urmowski, Utenus(z)owicz, Wiaze(ie)mski or Wiazeński, Wittort, Wojn, Wołożyński, Zdanowicz, Żdan, Żdanowicz, Żywibunt

Hipocentaur (Polish for "Hippocentaur") is a Lithuanian and Polish coat of arms. It was used by a number of szlachta (noble) families under the Polish–Lithuanian Commonwealth.

== History ==
The earliest images of the coat of arms come from 1422, when seals of two brothers from the Holszanski family were attached to the documents of the Treaty of Melno.

== Blazon ==
J-B. Rietstap, specifying that the field of the shield is red, blazons the arms as:

"De gueules, à un centaure Sagittaire au naturel, la tête retournée vers senestre, la queue levée, recourbée et terminée en tête de serpent. Casque couronné. Cimier: trois plumes d'autruche d'argent."

He also blazons the arms of Hornostay (Lithuania), with a blue field, as "D'azur au centaure sagittaire de carnation, ayant la queue terminée par un serpent qui fait jouer son dard, et acc. en pointe d'une rose d'argent (Hippocentaurus)'."

== Notable bearers ==
Notable bearers of this coat of arms have included:

- Paweł Holszański

== See also ==
- Polish heraldry
- Heraldry
- Coat of arms
