= Battle of Zasław (1491) =

1491 battle between Poland and the Crimean Khanate

- Part of Polish–Ottoman War
Date	24 January 1491
Location	Iziaslav, Poland (now part of Ukraine)
Result	Polish-Lithuanian victory

Belligerents
Crown of the Kingdom of Poland; Grand Duchy of Lithuania	Crimean Khanate

Commanders and leaders
Mikołaj Chodecki; Semyon Olshanski	Unknown

Strength
Unknown	9,000 soldiers

Casualties and losses
Unknown	c. 8,950 dead

The Battle of Zasław (Polish: Bitwa pod Zasławem) took place near the village of Iziaslav, on 24 January 1491, during the Polish–Ottoman War. It was fought by the armies of the Crown of the Kingdom of Poland led by Mikołaj Chodecki, and the Grand Duchy of Lithuania, led by Semyon Olshanski, against the forces of the Crimean Khanate. It was won by the Polish and Lithuanian sides.

== The battle ==
The battle took place by the Horyn River, near the village of Iziaslav, on 24 January 1491, during the Polish–Ottoman War. It was fought by the armies of the Crown of the Kingdom of Poland led by Mikołaj Chodecki, and the Grand Duchy of Lithuania, led by Semyon Olshanski, against the forces of the Crimean Khanate. The Crimean forces counted 9000 soldiers. The battle ended with Polish and Lithuanian, with Crimean forces being destroyed, with only around 50 soldiers surviving.
