= Olszański =

Olszański, f.: Olszanska is a Polish surname, an equivalent of the East Slavic surname Olshansky, see the latter article for the origin. Notable people with the surname include:

- Jan Olszanski (1919–2003), Ukrainian Roman Catholic prelate
- Michalina Olszańska (born 1992), Polish actress and writer
- Wojciech Olszański (born 1960), Polish nationalist activist, film and theatre actor, filmmaker, livestreamer, and stepfather of the above

== See also ==
- Olszewski
