= Paweł Holszański =

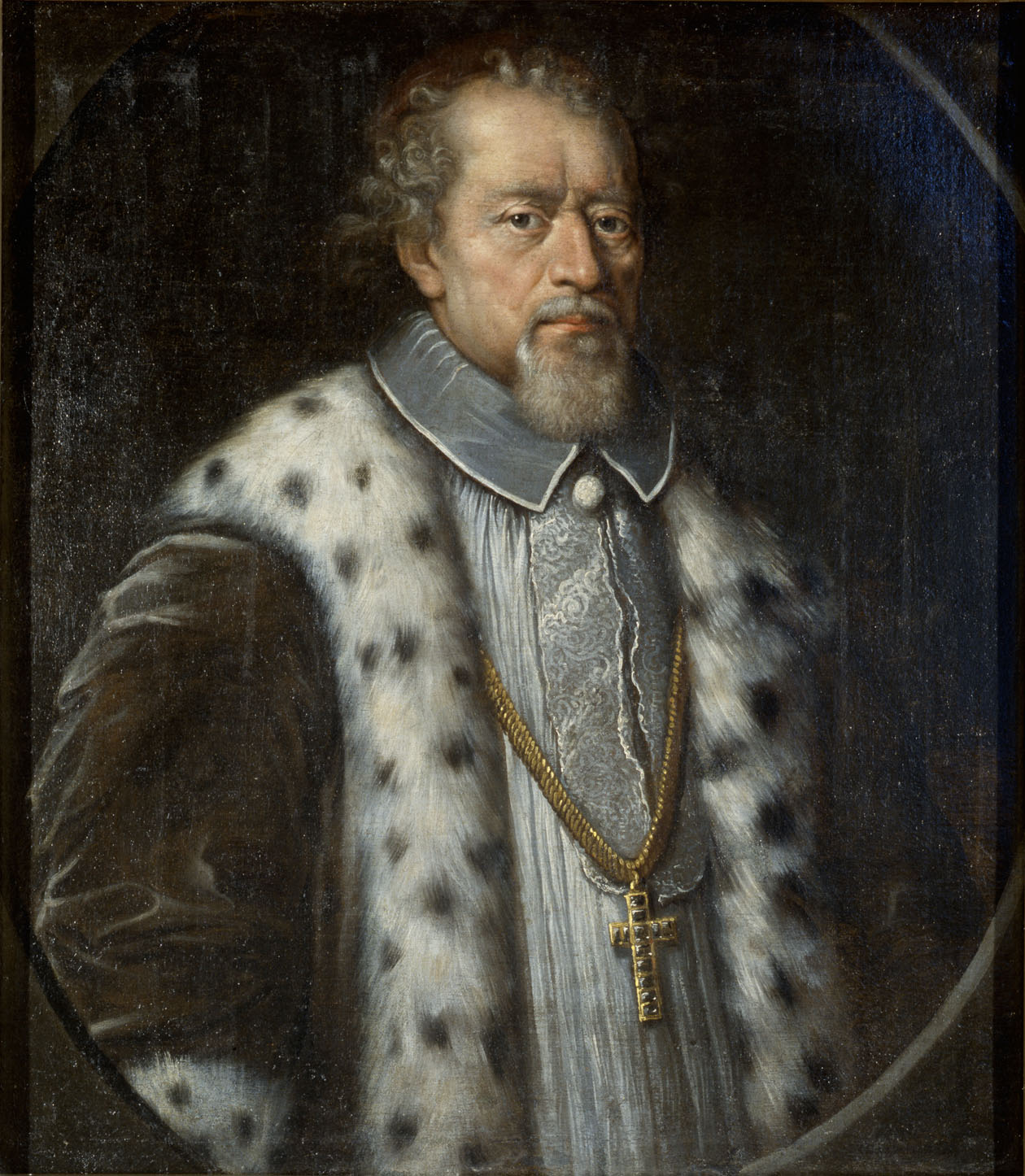
- Coat of arms: Hipocentaur
- Full name: Lithuanian: Povilas Alšėniškis
- Born: c. 1485
- Died: 4 September 1555; Vilnius
- Noble family: Olshanski
- Father: Aleksander Holszański
- Mother: Zofia Sudymuntowiczówna

Paweł Holszański (Lithuanian: Povilas Alšėniškis; c. 1485 – 4 September 1555, Vilnius) was a notable Catholic church official and one of the last male scions of the once-mighty Lithuanian Alšėniškiai princely family of the Grand Duchy of Lithuania.

== Biography ==
Born to Prince Aleksander Holszański, the Castellan of Vilnius, and Zofia Sudymuntowiczówna, daughter of Alekna Sudimantaitis. The Alšėniškiai family was a Lithuanian princely family that embraced Orthodoxy and became Ruthenized back in the 14th century. Only Paweł's father Aleksander embraced Catholicism, probably influenced by Franciscans.

Paweł Holszański studied in Kraków, his studies were interrupted by his appointment to the Lutsk bishopric. While studying in Kraków, he probably met Mikołaj Hussowczyk, of whom he later became a patron. Already a nominated bishop, he continued his studies in Bologna in 1512.

In 1513, he participated in the third, fourth and fifth sessions of the Fifth Lateran Council. He also witnessed the election of Leo X. On April 24, 1513, he was consecrated bishop in the Sistine Chapel. The pope presented him with gifts for King Sigismund the Old – a spade and a pearl-studded hat. On June 18, 1513, he was in Kraków, while on July 13 he presented papal gifts to the king in Miedniki. He then went to Lutsk to administer the diocese. He served as bishop of Lutsk between 1507 and 1536. He convened the first two diocesan synods in 1515 and 1519. His close associate was Franciszek of Lwów, later elevated to the Kyiv bishopric.

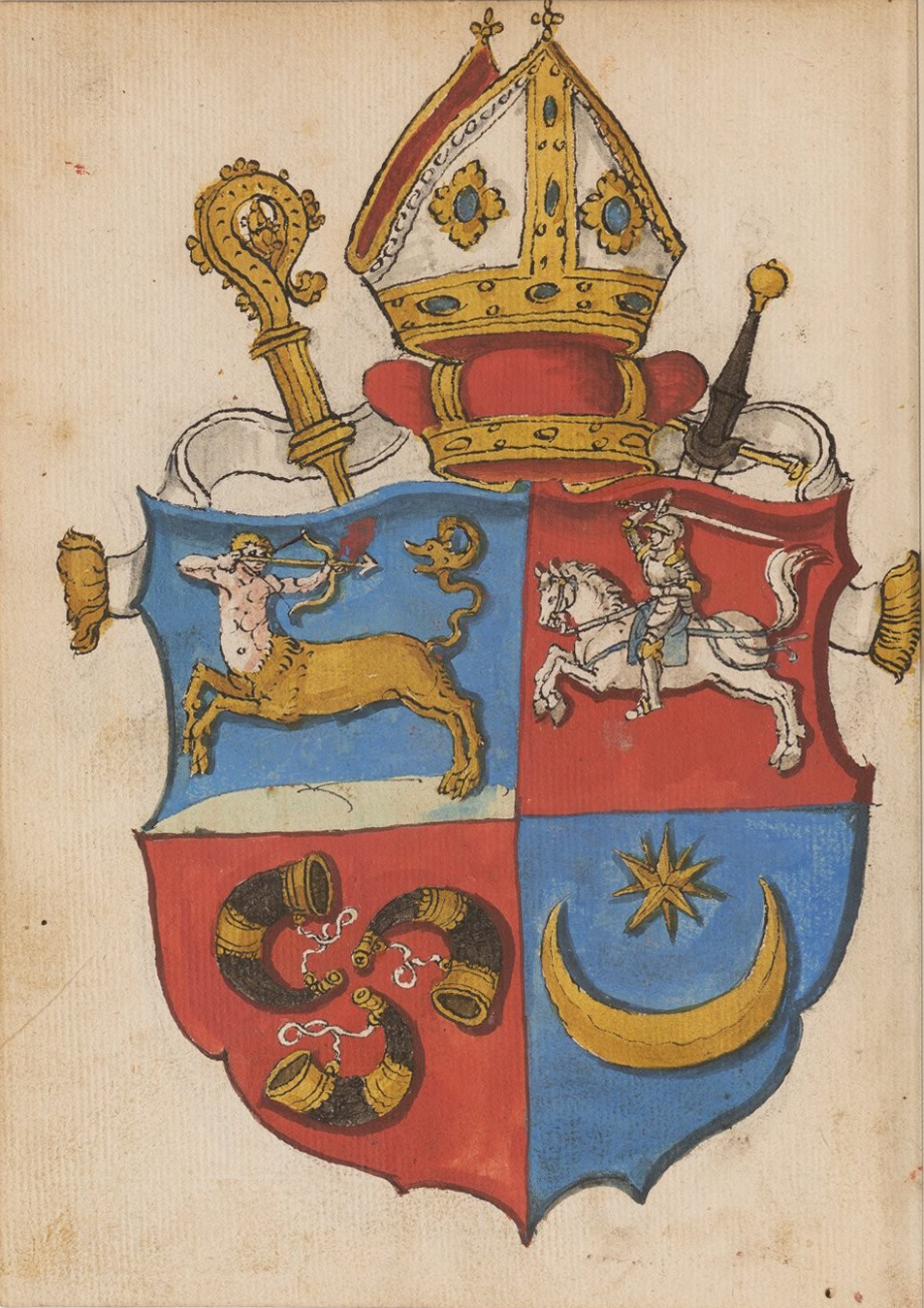
Holszański's coat-of-arms

On 15 March 1536 he became bishop of Vilnius. During his term as bishop, Holszański created several dozen new parishes in the Polish-Lithuanian borderlands. He convened diocesan synods in 1558, 1542, 1546 and 1555, mainly to combat the Reformation. He was also responsible for convincing the King of Poland and Grand Duke of Lithuania Sigismund II Augustus to expel Stanislovas Rapalionis and Abraomas Kulvietis, two pioneers of Lutheranism in Lithuania. He died in Vilnius on September 4, 1555. After his death, the administrator of the diocese was Canon Piotr Arciechowski.

== Estate ==
Holszański, as one of the last descendants of two powerful families, had considerable wealth. As a clergyman, he had no offspring, so his property passed mostly to the families of his sisters or to the monarch. In 1518, from his mother Sophia of Chożów, he received the royal lease of the castle in Punia, and the house in Vilnius that Holszański sold in 1528 to Mikołaj Wieżgajło. After his mother's death (shortly after 1518), Holszański inherited the family's main estates: Halshany, Lebiedziewo, Chożów, Dunilavichy and Voŭpa. These estates were transferred to the royal family after Holszański's death. After the death of his sister Barbara, a nun, he handed over the Vishnyev estate belonging to her to his sister Aleksandra's husband Mikołaj Pac.

== Ancestry ==
Ancestors of Paweł Holszański

8. Semyon Ivanovich Golshansky
4. Yuri Semyonovich Golshansky
9. Maria
2. Aleksander Holszański
10. Aleksandras Olelka
5. Ulyana Olelkovna
11. Anastasia Vasilievna of Moscow
1. Paweł Holszański
12. Sudimantas Dargaitis
6. Alekna Sudimantaitis
3. Zofia Sudymuntowiczówna
14. Jonas Manvydas
7. Jadviga Moniwid
15. Anna

Catholic Church titles
| Preceded by Albert Radziwiłł | Bishop of Łuck; 1507–1536 | Succeeded by Jerzy Chwalczewski |
| Preceded by John of the Lithuanian Dukes | Bishop of Wilno; 1536–1555 | Succeeded by Walerian Protasewicz |
