= Alšėniškiai =

Lithuanian noble family

Hipocentaur coat of arms

The House of Alšėniškiai (Belarusian: Гальшанскі, romanized: Halšanski, Polish: Holszański) was a Lithuanian by origin Ruthenianized and predominantly Eastern Orthodox princely family of Hipocentaur coat of arms. Their patrimony was the Duchy of Alšėnai, which included the castles of Rokantiškės and Alšėnai.

== History ==
=== Origin ===
Maciej Stryjkowski relates the origins of this family to Alšis Ramuntavičius (Polish: Holsza Romuntowicz) (c. 1250), coming from the line of Dausprungas. According to the ancient genealogy of Lithuanian princes written by Teodor Narbutt, Alšis was to be the eleventh generation of the Palemonids, and was to give rise to the Alšėniškiai, who ended in the late 16th century. What Stryjkowski or Narbutt wrote is very dubious as the distance of time is too large to prove it documentally. The history of this house, already based on some writings, only begins with Jonas Alšėniškis (c. 1379-1402), whose father Algimantas (Ougemundes) presents the first historically proven generation of the Alšėniškiai.

For the first time Alšėniškiai family is mentioned in written sources at the end of the 14th century when Ivan, son of Algimantas, assisted Vytautas in the Lithuanian Civil War (1381–1384) against Jogaila. Such a late mention of strong family is attributed to the geographic location of their domain: Alšėnai was neither in the way of the Teutonic or Livonian Orders. In contemporary sources, Algimantas is mentioned only in Ivan's patronymic name. However, late and unreliable Lithuanian Chronicles created a fanciful genealogy of Algimantas that connected him to the legendary Palemonids that allegedly hailed from the Roman Empire. Modern historians have discarded the genealogy as a work of fiction not based on historical facts.

=== 14th–16th centuries ===
The family was founded by Ivan Olshansky (fl. 1382–1402), a close ally of Vytautas, Grand Duke of Lithuania. Ivan's daughter Uliana married Vytautas while granddaughter Sophia of Halshany married Vytautas' cousin Jogaila, King of Poland. Sophia gave birth to Jogaila's sons and became the mother of the Jagiellonian dynasty which ruled Poland, Lithuania, Hungary and Bohemia. The male line of the Alšėniškiai family ended in 1556 with the death of Prince Semen (Paweł Holszański, last-but-one male representative of the family, died just one year before). Princess Maria Olshanskaya, the wife of Andrey Kurbsky, died in 1586. Their estates were inherited by the Sapieha family, which hailed from Smolensk. During the 14–16th centuries most of the family was Orthodox by faith and Ruthenian by language, although there were exceptions, in particular Paweł Holszański was a Catholic Church official.

== Family tree ==
Family of Alšėniškiai

Algimantas
Ivan Olshanski; Died in or after 1402
Alexander; Served Vasili I of Russia; Ruled Pereyaslavl until 1408	Andrew; Regent of Kiev?	Uliana; Wife of Vytautas; Grand Duke of Lithuania	Michael; Regent of Kiev; Died in 1433?	Semeon the Fierce; Executed in 1433
Sophia; Wife of Jogaila; King of Poland	Maria; Wife of Iliaș; Voivode of Moldavia	Vasilisa; Wife of Ivan Belsky	Yuri; Died after 1456	Several other?
Jagiellonian dynasty	Roman II and Alexăndrel	Belsky family	Alexander; Castellan of Vilnius; Died in 1511	Uliana; Eastern Orthodox Saint; Died at age 16	Ivan; Prince of Dubrovytsia; Executed in 1481	Anna; Wife of Martynas Goštautas	Semeon; Great Hetman; Died in 1505
Anna; Wife of Petras Jonaitis Mantigirdaitis	Janusz; Starost of Slonim; Died after 1505	Jerzy; Voivode of Kiev; Died in 1510	Paweł; Bishop of Lutsk and Vilnius; Died in 1555	Yuri; Died in 1536	Vasilisa	Tetiana; Wife of Konstanty Ostrogski; Died in 1522
Several daughters and sons	Maria; Wife of Andrey Kurbsky; Died in 1586	Ivan; Voivode of Kiev and Trakai; Died in 1549	Semeon; Last male heir Died in 1556

Main source:

Notes
- The family tree is incomplete.
