= Mikołaj Sapieha (1581–1638) =

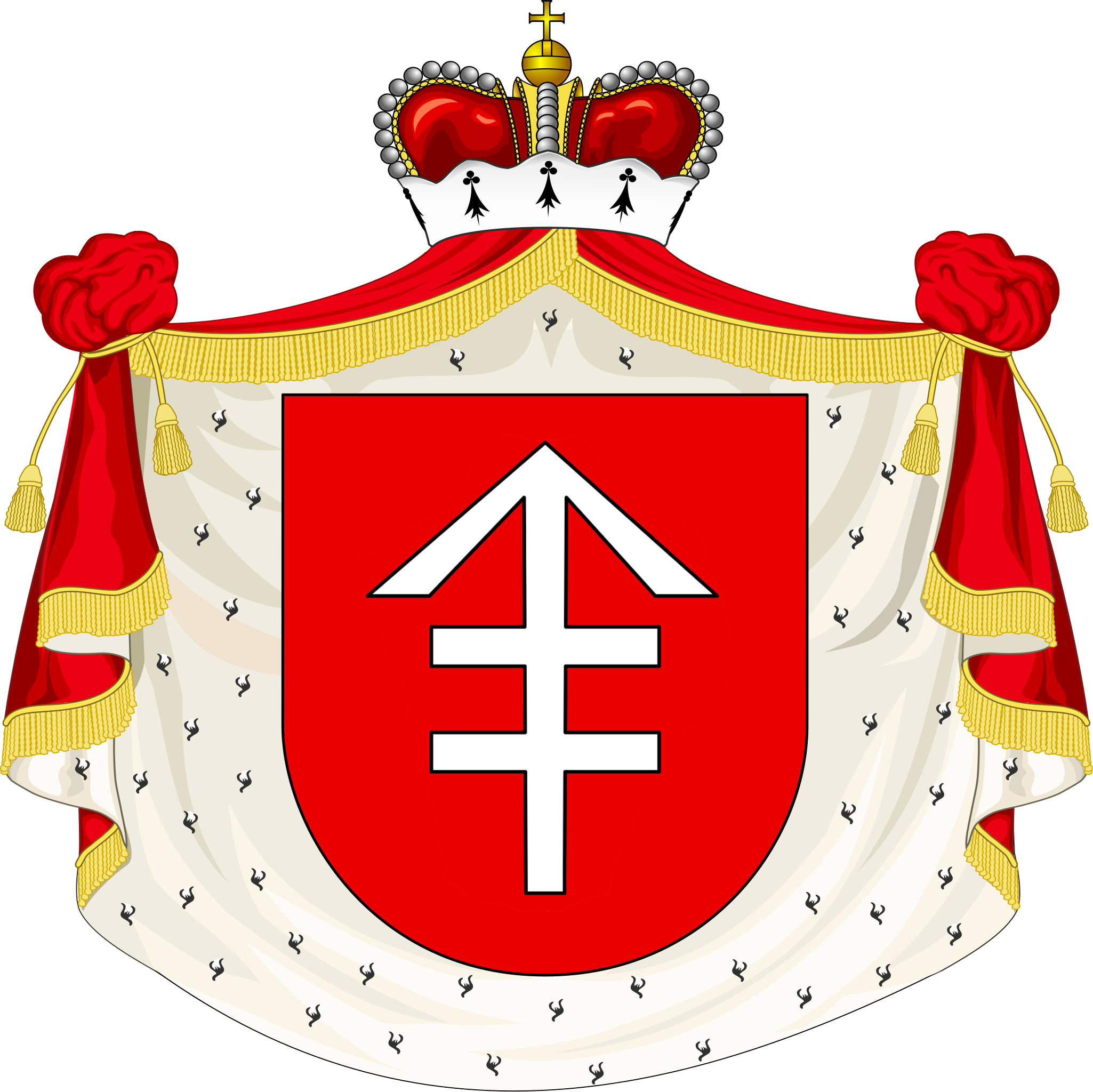

Mikołaj Sapieha (Lithuanian: Mikalojus Sapiega) (1581–1638) was a voivode (Voivode of Mińsk (1611–1618), Voivode of Nowogródek (1618–1638)) in the Polish–Lithuanian Commonwealth.

Son of Bohdan Pawłowicz Sapieha and brother of Paweł Stefan Sapieha. Friend of Lew Sapieha. Father of Tomasz Sapieha.

He studied abroad, from 1582 in Bologne, later in Rome and Orléans. After returning to his homeland, in 1588 he became the podkomorzy of Grodno. In 1596 he was sent with a diplomatic mission to Sweden by King of Poland Sigismund III Vasa, in order to negotiate for Zygmunt's rights to the throne of Sweden. In 1603 he was a deputy to Sejm. From 1608 to 1609 he rested at health facilities in Cieplice and Karlsbad. In 1611 he became the Voivode of Mińsk. Later he stayed in his estate in Boćki. In 1618 he became the Voivode of Nowogródek. Deputy to Sejm again in 1620. In 1623 chosen as member of a commission for negotiations with Sweden, he refused the nomination citing poor health. Member of convocation sejm of 1632, took part in the preparations for the Smolensk War. Died in 1638.
