= Duchy of Alšėnai =

The Duchy of Alšėnai (Lithuanian: Alšėnų kunigaikštystė) was a feudal patrimony of the Alšėniškiai in the late 13th and mid-16th centuries.

== History ==
It was first mentioned in the Bychowiec Chronicle, where Alšis, son of Romuntas (slavicized as Holsza, son of Romunt), according to legend, was the one who "founded a town on the river Korablis; He arose from there, began reigning and called himself the duke of Alšėnai". Maciej Stryjkowski also relates the origins of the Alšėniškiai family to Alšis Romuntavičius (c. 1250), coming from the line of Dausprungas.

The dukes of Alšėnai held high positions in the Lithuanian state for a long time. In 1440 and 1492, meetings were held in Alšėnai to determine the candidates for the grand ducal throne. In the middle of the 16th century, the ancestral possession of the Alšėniškiai passed to the Sapieha family.

== Geography ==
The duchy's center was Alšėnai (now Halshany) and it was the territory between the rivers Vilija and Nemunas. In the 15th century, the duchy stretched from north to south - from Vilkmergė (now Ukmergė) and Pastavy to Hlusk and Turov, from east to west - from Minsk to Masty.

== Sources ==
- Sachenko, Bl, ed. (1994). "Гальшанскае княства" [Principality of Alšėnai]. Энцыклапедыя гісторыі Беларусі (in Belarusian). Vol. 2: Беліцк — Гімн. Minsk: BelEn. ISBN 5-85700-142-0.
- Maxim (2003). "Хроніка Биховця" [Chronicle of Bykhovets]. Izbornyk. p. 135.
- Korzun, E. S. (1987). Гольшаны [Golshany] (in Belarusian). Minsk.
- Pułaski, Kazimierz (1887). "VII. Książęta Holszańscy. Monografia historyczno-genealogiczna." [VII. Dukes of Alšėnai. Historical and genealogical monograph.]. Szkice i poszukiwania historyczne [Sketches and historical research] (in Polish). Kraków. pp. 259–305.
- Wolff, Józef (1895). "Kniaziowie litewsko-ruscy od końca czternastego wieku" [Lithuanian-Ruthenian princes from the end of the fourteenth century]. Biblioteka Instytutu Historii Uam (in Polish). Warszawa: 94–115.
