= Serge Schmemann =

American journalist

- Born: April 12, 1945 (age 80); France
- Education: Harvard University (AB); Columbia University (MA)
- Occupations: Writer and editorial page editor
- Parent: Alexander Schmemann

Serge Schmemann (born April 12, 1945) is a French-born American writer and member of the editorial board of The New York Times. He specializes in international affairs. He was editorial page editor of the Paris-based International Herald Tribune, the erstwhile global edition of The New York Times, from 2003 until its dissolution in 2013. Earlier he worked for the Associated Press and was a bureau chief and editor for The New York Times.

== Life and career ==
Serge Schmemann was born in France to Alexander Schmemann and Juliana Ossorguine. Through his mother, he is a descendant of Juliana of Lazarevo, a Russian Orthodox Saint. He moved to the United States in 1951. Serge grew up speaking Russian at home, but visited his ancestral homeland for the first time only in 1980 when he arrived with his family as a Moscow correspondent for the Associated Press. It was not until 1990 that the Soviet authorities allowed him to visit his grandparents' home village near Kaluga. His reflections on the village's changing fate provided the subject matter for his memoirs, published in 1997.

A 1963 graduate of the Kent School in Kent, CT, he received his undergraduate degree in English from Harvard University in 1967 and an M.A. in Slavic studies from Columbia University in 1971.

Writing for The New York Times, he won the Pulitzer Prize for International Reporting in 1991 for his coverage of the German reunification, which he also made the subject of a book. The September 12, 2001, New York Times featured a front-page article by Schmemann about the September 11 attacks. He won an Emmy Award (Outstanding Individual Achievement in a Craft: Writing) in 2003 for the Discovery Channel documentary Mortal Enemies.

Schmemann has three children and lives in the District of Columbia.

== Awards ==
- 1991 Pulitzer Prize for International Reporting for coverage of the reunification of Germany
- 1998 PEN/Martha Albrand Award for First Nonfiction for Echoes of a Native Land

== Bibliography ==
- Schmemann, Serge (2007) [2006]. When the Wall Came Down: The Berlin Wall and the Fall of Soviet Communism. New York Times Books. Kingfisher. ISBN 978-0-7534-6153-2. OCLC 61303439.
- Schmemann, Serge (1999). Echoes of a Native Land: Two Centuries of a Russian Village. Vintage. ISBN 978-0-679-75707-8. OCLC 36074523.
