= Dunilavichy =

Agrotown in Vitebsk Region, Belarus

Dunilavichy Дунілавічы
- Agrotown
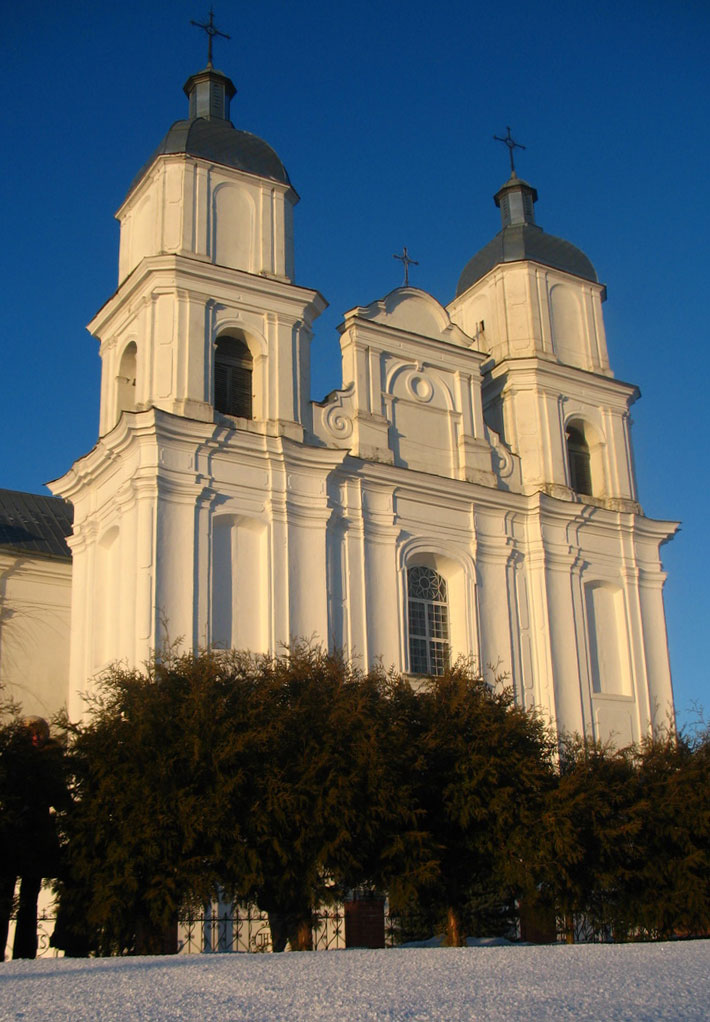
- Church of the Holy Trinity

- Location within Belarus
- Coordinates: 55°04′31″N 27°14′30″E
- Country: Belarus
- Region: Vitebsk Region
- District: Pastavy District
- Time zone: UTC+3 (MSK)

Dunilavichy (Note: Belarusian: Дунілавічы, romanized: Dunilavičy; Russian: Дуни́ловичи, romanized: Dunilovichi; Polish: Duniłowicze.) is an agrotown in Vitebsk Region, Pastavy District, northern Belarus.

== History ==
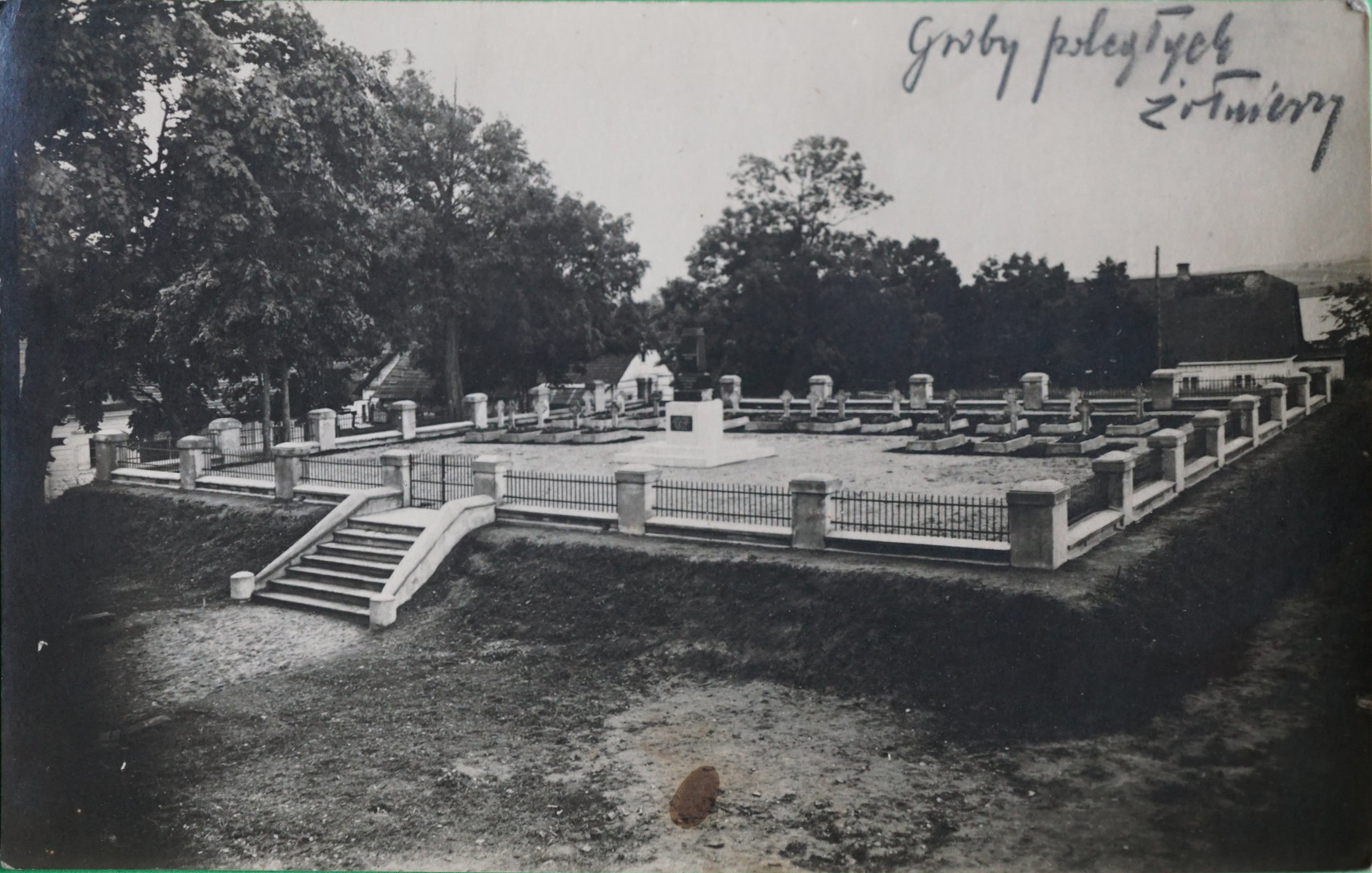
War cemetery of Polish soldiers fallen in the 1920 battles

It was a private town of the Holszański family until 1551, when it passed to King Sigismund II Augustus. Later on, it became again a private town of various nobles, including the Białłozor, Brzostowski, Janiszewski and Tyszkiewicz families. It was administratively located in the Oszmiana County in the Vilnius Voivodeship of the Polish–Lithuanian Commonwealth. After the Second Partition of Poland in 1793, the town was annexed by Russia.

Following World War I, it was part of reborn Poland. During the Polish–Soviet War, it was the site of two battles. The first was fought on 19–21 May 1920, ending in a Soviet victory, the second was fought on 3–4 June 1920, and was won by the Poles. In the 1921 census, 49.4% people declared Jewish nationality, 43.1% declared Polish nationality, and 6.3% declared Belarusian nationality.

Following the invasion of Poland in September 1939, the town was first occupied by the Soviet Union until 1941, then by Nazi Germany until 1944, and re-occupied by the Soviet Union afterwards, which eventually annexed it from Poland in 1945.

== Demographics ==
Historical population
Year	Pop.	±%
1886	691	—
1921	1,386	+100.6%
