= Halshany Castle =

Former castle in Halshany, Belarus

Coordinates: 54.251264°N 26.020292°E

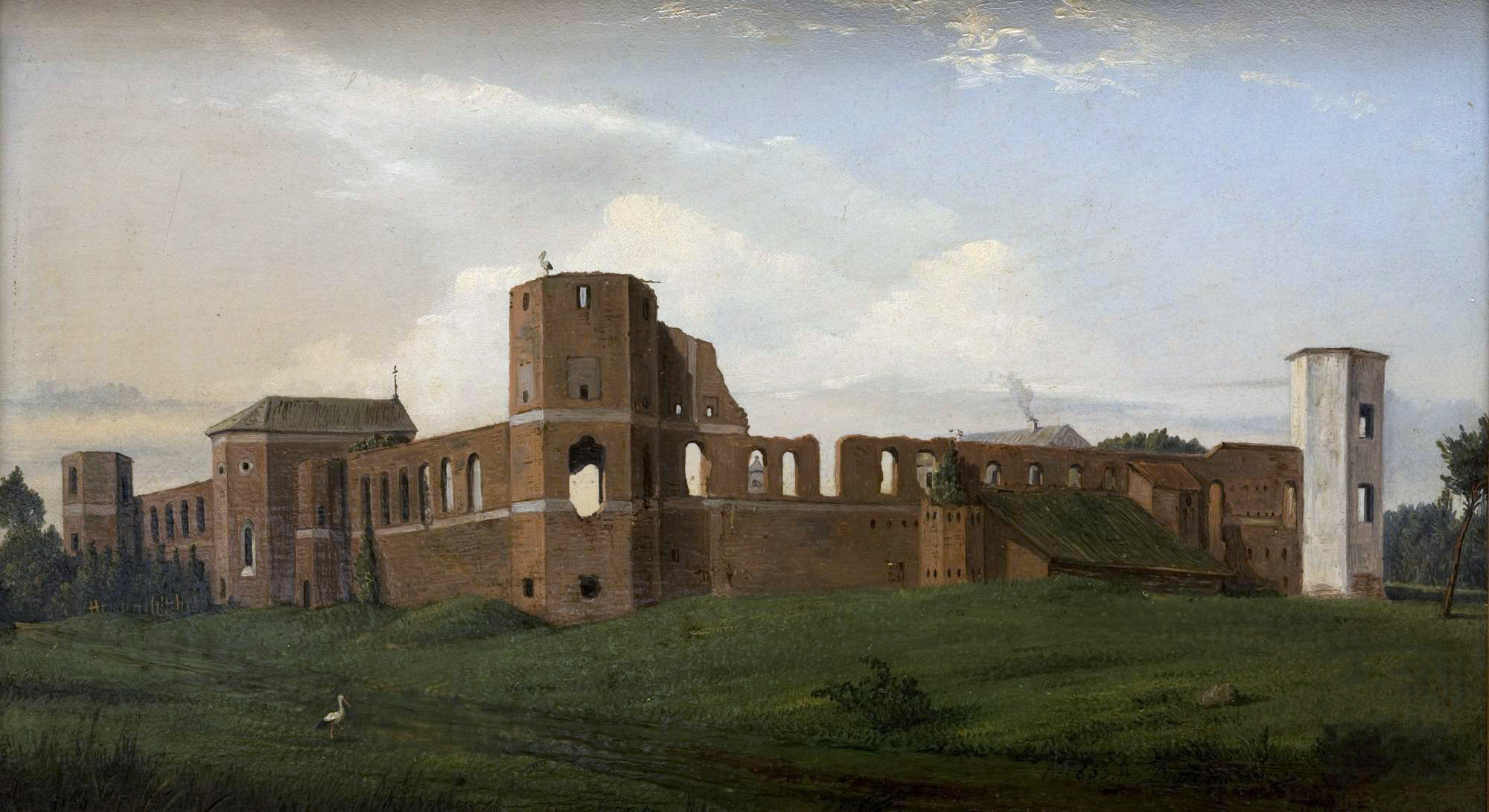
The castle in 1853

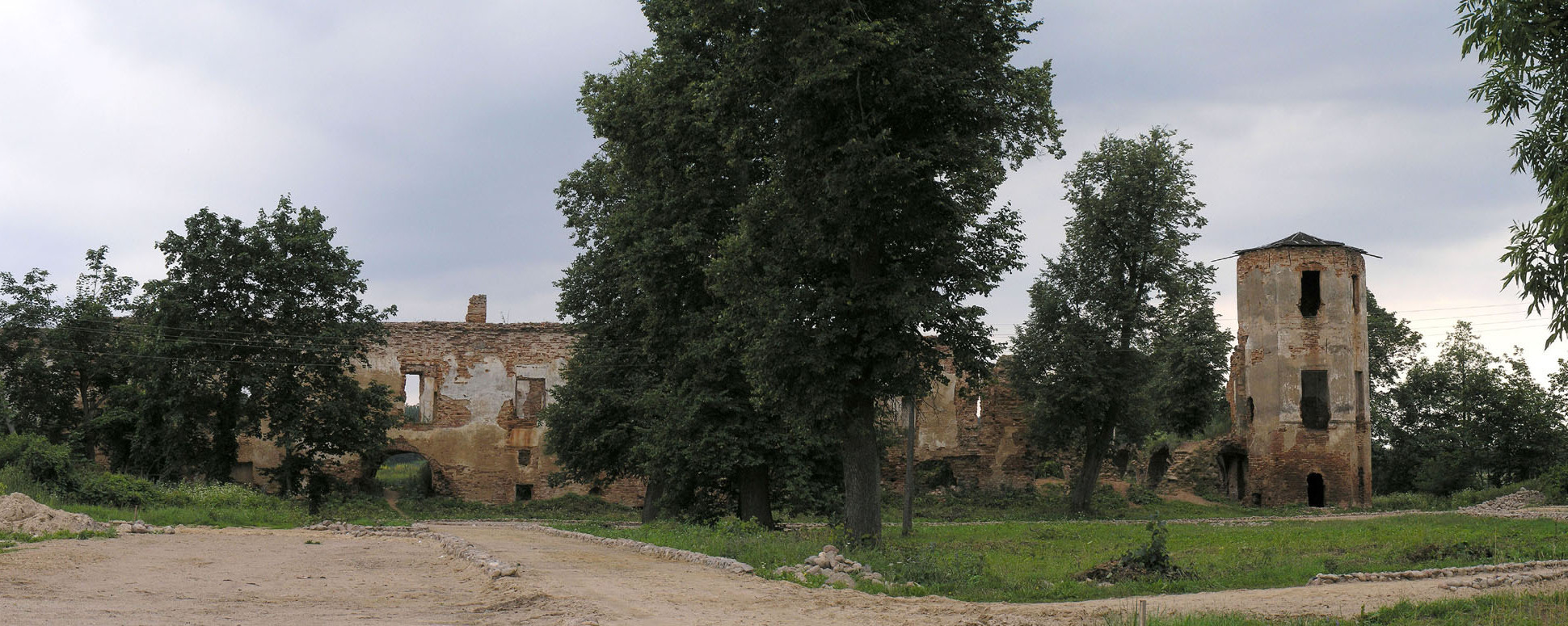
The ruins in 2007.

Halshany or Holszany Castle (Belarusian: Гальшанскі замак, Lithuanian: Alšėnų pilis, Polish: Zamek holszański) is the ruined residence of the Sapieha magnate family in Halshany, Hrodna Voblast, Belarus. It used to be the seat of one of the largest land estates in the Grand Duchy of Lithuania.

The current structure was built about 1610 by Paweł Stefan Sapieha to replace an older castle of the Holszanski princely family, of whom Sapiehas were descendants and heirs.

Also known as the Black Castle (although it is built of red brick), the residence formerly rivaled Mir Castle as the most elegant private château of the Grand Duchy of Lithuania. The name Black Castle in fact originally applies to a fictional building from a book by Uladzimir Karatkievich, which was loosely based on Halshany Castle.

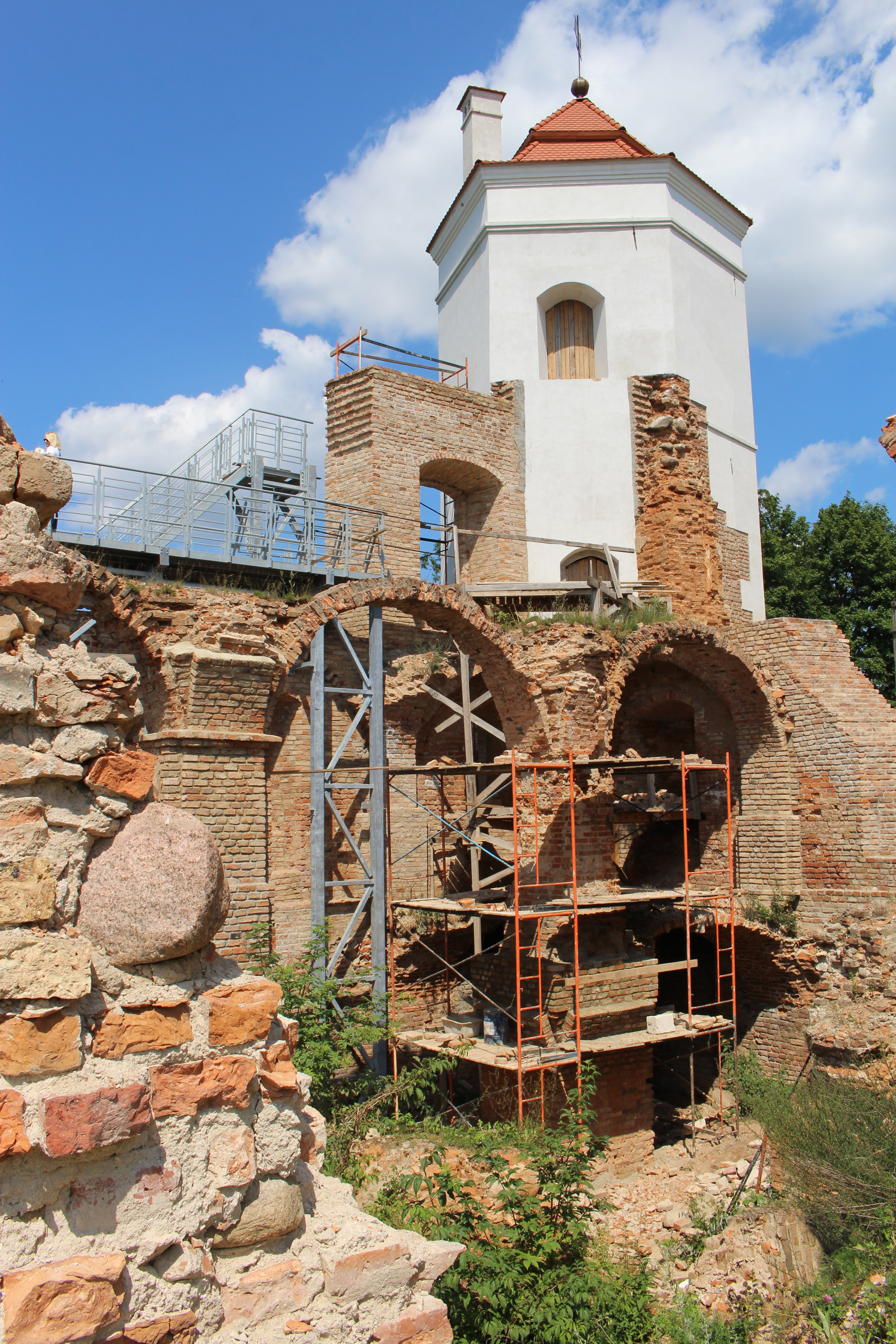
Restoration works of the tower, 2019

The castle and the surrounding estates were devastated, robbed and looted, twice: by the invading Swedes troops during the Deluge (history) and during the Great Northern War in 1704. Due to financial stress experienced by the Sapiehas in the wake of the Domestic War and ongoing Great Northern War, the castle had never been fully restored.

Later during the 18th century the castle with its estate diminished by creditors passed to the Żaba family, to be sold to the Korsak family with the estate further diminished by the creditors. The last Polish landlords. the Korsaks, sold, in the last quarter of the 19th century, the castle to a Russian landlord, Gorbanyov, who had the castles' towers pulled down in 1880, but in 1880s, according to the Geographical Dictionary of the Kingdom of Poland, there were still 2 floors occupied with some of the wall paintings visible.

In 2018 the government-funded restoration of the northern tower started.

An annual tournament is held near its walls each summer.
