= Uliana Olshanska =

Grand Duchess of Lithuania
- Tenure: 1418 – 27 October 1430
- Died: 1448
- Spouse: Vytautas
- House: Olshanski
- Father: Ivan Olshansky
- Mother: Agripina

Princess Uliana Olshanska (Lithuanian: Julijona Alšėniškė or Julijona Vytautienė; Polish: Julianna Holszańska; died 1448) was Grand Duchess of Lithuania as the second wife of Vytautas. They had no issue. She was a noblewoman from the Alšėniškiai family, but very little is known about her life.

== Life ==
Her first husband was Ivan of Karachev. German chronicle of Johann von Posilge and Polish historian Jan Długosz asserted that Ivan was murdered so that widowed Uliana could marry Vytautas. Most likely she was an Eastern Orthodox who converted to Catholicism in order to marry Vytautas.

After the death of his first wife Anna on 31 July 1418, Vytautas wished to marry Uliana, daughter of one of his closest allies Ivan Olshansky. However, Anna was sister of Agripina, who was wife of Ivan and mother of Uliana. That made Vytautas uncle-in-law of Uliana. Piotr Krakowczyk, Bishop of Vilnius, refused to perform the wedding ceremony due to this relationship and demanded they seek approval from the pope. Jan Kropidło, Bishop of Włocławek, performed the ceremony before Christmas 1418 and, eventually, Vytautas obtained a matrimonial dispensation from Pope Martin V.

It appears that the marriage was a loving one, but they had no children. Vytautas died in October 1430. Uliana died in 1448.

According to historian Ignas Jonynas Uliana's further life is unknown.

Following her death, she was buried at the Kiev Pechersk Lavra.

Uliana Olshanska Olshanski Died: After 1430
Royal titles
Preceded by Anna	Grand Duchess of Lithuania; 1418–1430	Succeeded by Elisabeth of Austria
