= Juliana of Lazarevo =

Russian Orthodox noblewoman, philanthropist and Saint

Saint Juliana the Merciful
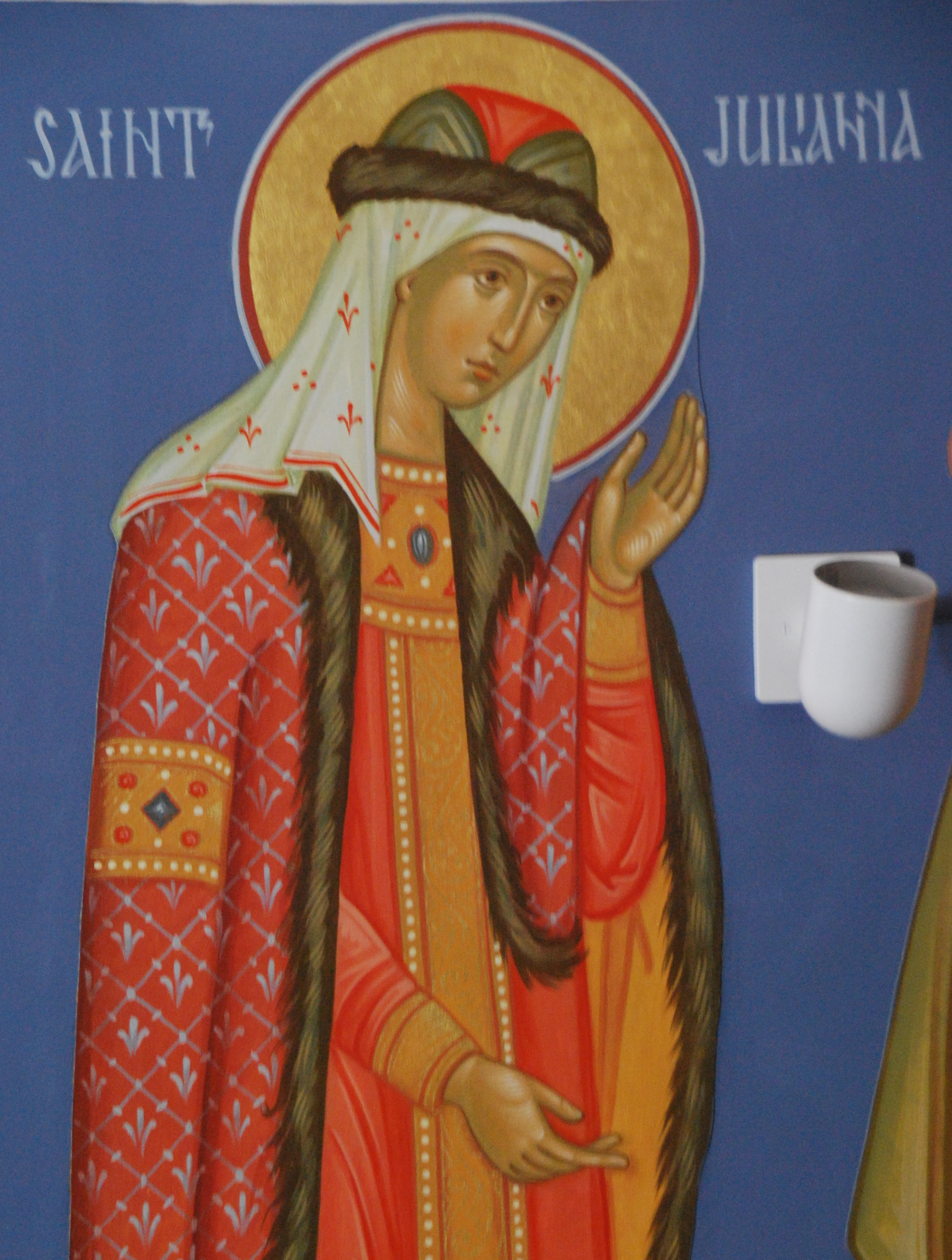
- Orthodox icon of St Juliana
- Venerated in: Eastern Orthodox Church
- Feast: 2 January (N.S); 15 January (O.S)
- Patronage: Marriage, kitchens, the home

Juliana of Lazarevo (or Juliana of Murom) (1530 – 10 January 1604) is a saint of the Eastern Orthodox Church. She was born in Moscow, to Justin and Stefanida Nedyurev, and married Giorgi Osorgin, owner of the village of Lazarevo, near Murom. She lived a righteous life, consecrating herself to helping poor and needy people.

Her life is considered as an example of a layperson living in the world, as anyone may be supposed to please God not only by withdrawing from the world to a monastic cell, but within a family, amid cares for children, spouse, and members of the household.

The saint day of Juliana of Lazarevo is celebrated by the Orthodox Church on 2 January New Style and 15 January Old Style.

A descendant of hers, Juliana Ossorguine, was married to Fr. Alexander Schmemann and was the mother of Serge Schmemann.

There is a parish of the Western-American Diocese of the Russian Orthodox Church Outside of Russia named "St. Juliana of Lazarevo Orthodox Church".

== See also ==
- Eastern Orthodoxy
- Russian Orthodox Church
