= Juliana Olshanskaya =

Ukrainian saint of the Eastern Orthodox Church

Saint Juliana Olshanskaya
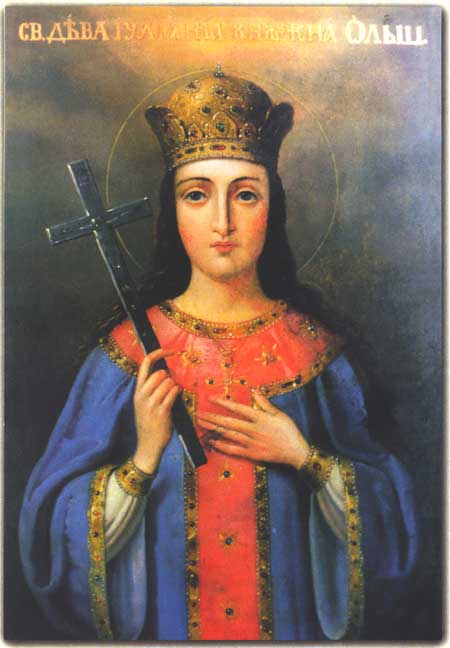
- Born: c. 1525
- Died: c. 1540 (age 16)
- Honored in: Eastern Orthodox Church
- Major shrine: Near Caves
- Feast: 28 September

Juliana Olshanskaya (c. 1525 – c. 1540; Ukrainian: Юліанія Юріївна Ольшанська Дубровицька, romanized: Yulianiia Yuriivna Olshanska Dubrovytska) was a member of the Olshanski noble family who became a saint in the Eastern Orthodox Church. Dying a virgin around 16 years of age, she was buried in the monastery of Kyiv Pechersk Lavra. Decades later, her body was uncovered during the digging of a new grave. It is claimed that her remains were in a state of incorruptibility; relics were taken and she was venerated as a saint. The early 17th-century Archimandrite Peter Mogila claimed to have had a vision of Saint Juliana in which she reproached him for a lack of respect given to her relics. He arranged for nuns to create a new reliquary. The relics survived a fire in 1718 and are now in the church of the Near Caves. Her feast day is 28 September.

== Life ==
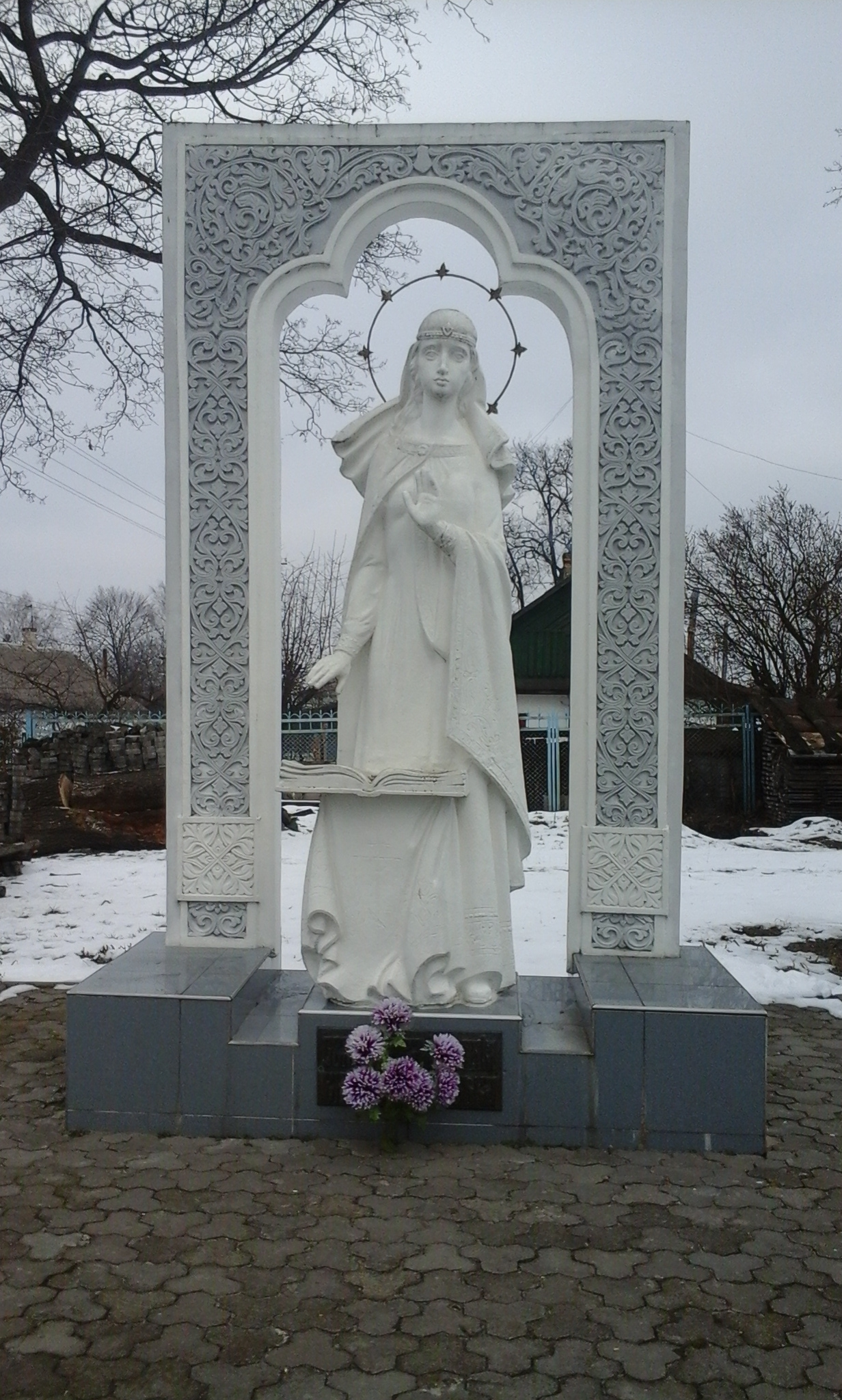
Statue to Saint Juliana in Dubrovytsia

Juliana Olshanskaya was the daughter of Prince Yurii (also Georgy) Dubrovitsky-Olshansky of the Olshanski family who ruled part of modern Ukraine. Her father was a benefactor of the Kyiv Pechersk Lavra monastery, and Juliana was said to be highly religious. She died in the summer of her 16th year, as a virgin, and was buried in the caves of the monastery. She is thought to have died circa 1540.

== Sainthood and relics ==
Juliana's body was discovered during the time of Archimandrite Elisey Pletenetsky (in office 1599–1624), whilst digging a grave for the burial of another virgin. After opening a coffin that lay beneath a stone marked with her name and the Olshanski coat of arms, her body was said to be in a state of incorruptibility. Juliana was clad in expensive silks and gold cloth and wore a gold beaded crown and gold jewelled earrings. Relics of her body were gathered and placed in the Pechersk church.

Later in Pletenetsky's time, it is said that an Arianist came to the church and asked to see the relics of Juliana. He is said to have stolen a ring from her finger and, upon leaving the church, suffered painfully before dropping dead. Pletenetsky had the stolen ring placed with the church's most holy relics at the icon of the Virgin Mary. On another occasion, Abbot Feodosii Safonovych, visiting from St. Michael's Golden-Domed Monastery in Kyiv, viewed the relics. Safonovych later said he had a vision of Juliana that convinced him to worship more piously.

The monastery's Archimandrite Peter Mogila (in office 1633–1646) claimed to have seen a vision of Saint Juliana in one of his dreams. Mogila claimed Juliana reproached him for the lack of respect paid to her relics. He then ordered them to be placed in a new reliquary, made by nuns. Juliana's relics survived a fire in the Pechersk church in 1718 and are now in the church of the Near Caves. Her feast day is 10 October, when she is commemorated as one of the seven saints of Volhynia, but she is also commemorated individually by the monastery on 19 July.
