= Olshansky =

Olshansky or Olshanski are East Slavic toponymic surnames associated with the places Olshana, Olshanka, Olshany, Halshany. The Belarusian-language rendering of the surname are Halshansky, Alshansky, Polish: Olszański, Holszański, Lithuanian: Olšanski, Alšėniškis. In Latin-language sources, names of the house include: Domus Olszansciorum, sometimes with subdivisions like Domus Olszansciorum Hippocentaurus or D. O. Corvo. Feminine variants: Olshanska, Olshanskaya, Hoshanska, Halshanskaya. Notable people with the surname include:

- Members of the Olshanski/Holshansky noble family (Alšėniškiai; Polish: Holszańscy herbu Hippocentaurus), which can be variously styled in East Slavic, Polish, or Lithuanian ways
- Barbara Olshansky, American human rights lawyer
- Igor Olshansky (born 1982), American football player
- Ivan Olshansky (died in or after 1402), progenitor of the Lithuanian princely Alšėniškiai (Holshansky) family
- Konstantin Olshansky, (1915–1944), Ukrainian Hero of the Soviet Union
- Nikolay Olshansky (born 1939), Russian politician
- Paweł Holszański (1485–1555)
- S. Jay Olshansky (born 1954), professor in the School of Public Health at the University of Illinois at Chicago
- Semyon Olshanski (died in 1505 or 1506), noble from the Holshansky family
- Sergei Olshansky (born 1948), Soviet football player
- Sophia Holshanska, or Sophia of Halshany (1405–1461), Queen of Poland as the fourth and last wife of Jogaila, King of Poland and Supreme Duke of Lithuania
- Uliana Olshanska (died 1448), noblewoman from the Olshanski (Holshanski, Alšėniškiai) family, the second wife of Vytautas, Grand Duke of Lithuania
- Vladimir Olshansky (born 1947), Russian performing artist, director, composer, sculptor
- Yelena Olshanskaya, original name of Elena Miller, a Russian who, as alleged by the Canadian Security Intelligence Service (CSIS), lived in Canada as a spy
- Juliana Olshanskaya (1525–1540), noblewoman, saint in the Eastern Orthodox Church

== See also ==
- Olszanski
- Olszewski
