= Halshany =

Agrotown in Grodno Region, Belarus

Halshany Гальшаны (Belarusian)
- Agrotown
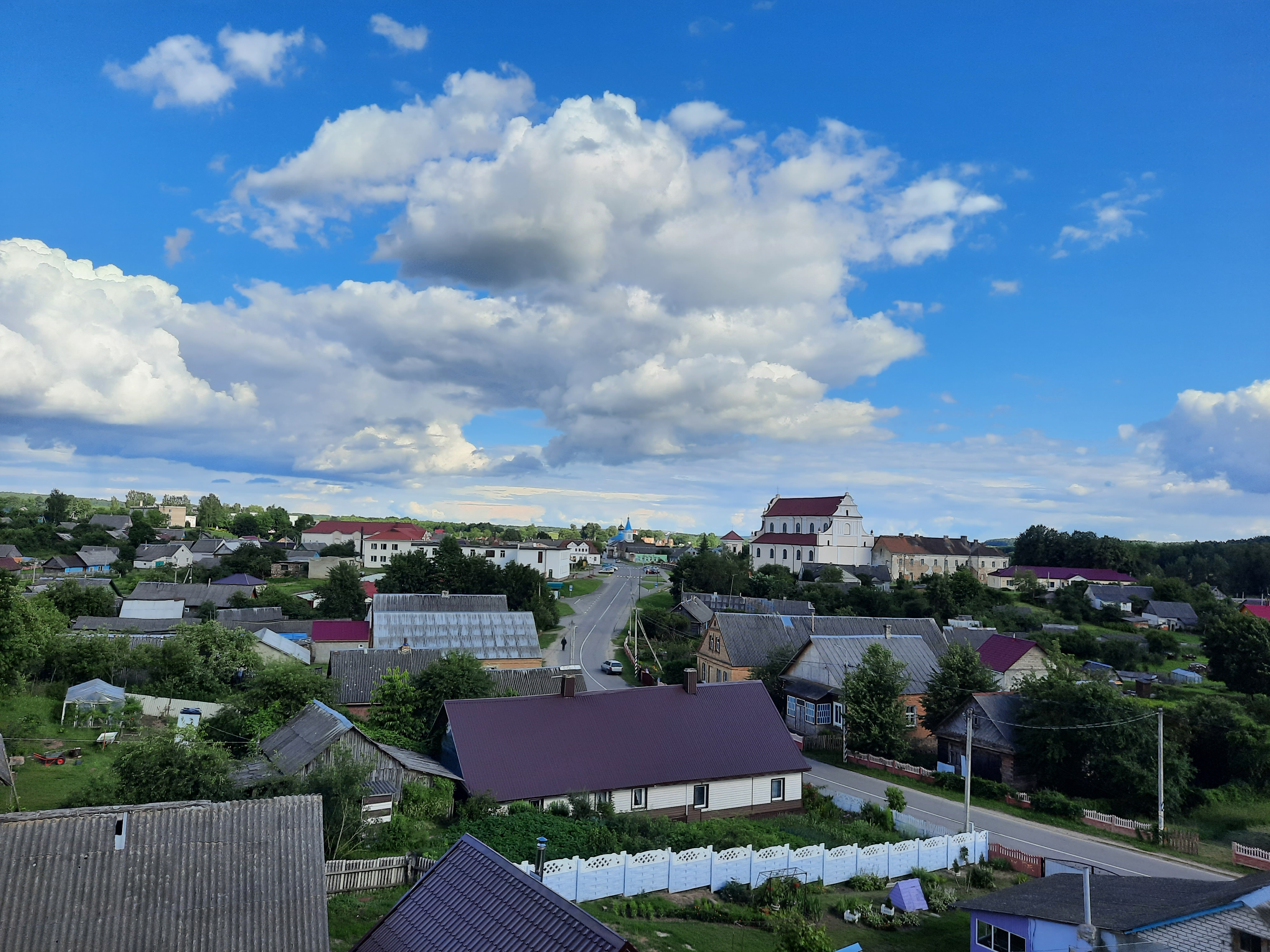

- Flag Seal

- Location within Belarus
- Coordinates: 54°15′N 26°01′E
- Country: Belarus
- Region: Grodno Region
- District: Ashmyany District
- Time zone: UTC+3 (MSK)

Halshany (Note: Belarusian: Гальшаны, romanized: Haĺšany; Russian: Гольшаны, romanized: Golshany; Lithuanian: Alšėnai, Galšia; Polish: Holszany; Yiddish: אלשאן, romanized: Olshan.) is an agrotown in Ashmyany District, Grodno Region, Belarus. It serves as the administrative center of Halshany selsoviet.

It is known as the former seat of the Olshansky princely family and the location of the ruined Halshany Castle.

== History ==
It was the birthplace of Sophia of Halshany, a Ruthenian princess who became Grand Duchess of Lithuania and Queen of Poland, extending the Jagiellonian dynasty over two states.

During the times of the Polish–Lithuanian Commonwealth the town was in the hands of the Sapieha family, which constructed a castle there in early 17th century. The town grew smaller with the devastations of the mid-17th century wars wrought in the Commonwealth. Until the Great Northern War plague outbreak in the early 18th century the majority of inhabitants of the surroundings of Halshany were Lithuanians, however most of them died due to plague and military actions, and landlords relocated Belarusians there.

The town became part of the Russian Empire with the partitions of Polish–Lithuanian Commonwealth in the 18th century.

During the French invasion of Russia, the vicinity was captured by the Franco-Polish troops on 30 June 1812. It was recaptured by the Russian Imperial Army on 8 December of the same year. In the mid-19th century only 1/5 of inhabitants in Halshany Parish still spoke Lithuanian, while the majority spoke Belarusian.

After the First World War the town became a part of the Second Polish Republic; it was taken by the Soviet Union after the Soviet invasion of Poland and became part of the Belorussian SSR. After the dissolution of the Soviet Union it became part of modern Belarus.

== Notable people ==
- Ben Zion Goldberg (1895-1972), Yiddish journalist
- Jazep Hermanovich (1890 - 1978), Belarusian Eastern Catholic priest, writer, poet and Gulag survivor
