= List of public art in Vilnius =

This is a list of public art in Vilnius, Lithuania.

- 1916, 1989: Three Crosses (Lithuanian: Trys kryžiai) was designed by a Polish-Lithuanian architect and sculptor Antoni Wiwulski in 1916. It was constructed in Kalnai Park on the Hill of Three Crosses, in the place where the three wooden crosses used to stand at least since 1636. It was torn down in 1950 by order of the Soviet Union authorities. A new monument built by Stanislovas Kuzma after the design of Henrikas Šilgalis was erected in its place in 1989.
- 1922: Bust of Stanisław Moniuszko in a park near the Church of St. Catherine (lt:Vilniaus Šv. Kotrynos bažnyčia) on the Vilnius Street, architect Bolesław Bałzukiewicz. It rests on a pedestal left from the bust to Alexander Pushkin.
- 1924: Old Adam Mickiewicz Monument, destroyed by a flood of Neris in 1938
- 1984: Adam Mickiewicz Monument, Vilnius
- 1991: Memorial to victims of mass deportations, Naujoji Vilnia neighborhood by the train station which witnessed thousands of victims of Soviet political repressions in Lithuania deported during 1940–1941. It was the last station in the Lithuanian territory on their way to Siberia and Kazakhstan.
- 2005: a memorial plaque of sand-pink marble with a bas-relief of the thinker and medieval scholar Lev Karsavin on the facade of the house at Didžioji Street by sculptor Romualdas Kvintas.
- 2007: a monument to "the Vilnius citizen doctor Zemach Shabad, prototype of the Doctor Aybolit", with inscriptions in English, Yiddish, Lithuanian and Russian, at the crossroads of Lithuanian: Mėsinių g. and Lithuanian: Dysnos g., sculptor lt:Romualdas Kvintas.
- 2009: Tree of Unity is a monument in Vingis Park that symbolizes the unity of all Lithuanians in the world
- A sculpture bench with a guitar in Vilnius in remembrance of singer-songwriter Vytautas Kernagis.
- "Mūzų šventė" ("Festivity of Muses", also known as "Three Muses"; copper, gilding) portraying Drama (Calliope), Comedy (Thalia) and Tragedy (Melpomene) at the façade of the Lithuanian National Drama Theatre, sculptor Stanislovas Kuzma
