= Franciscan martyrs of Vilnius =

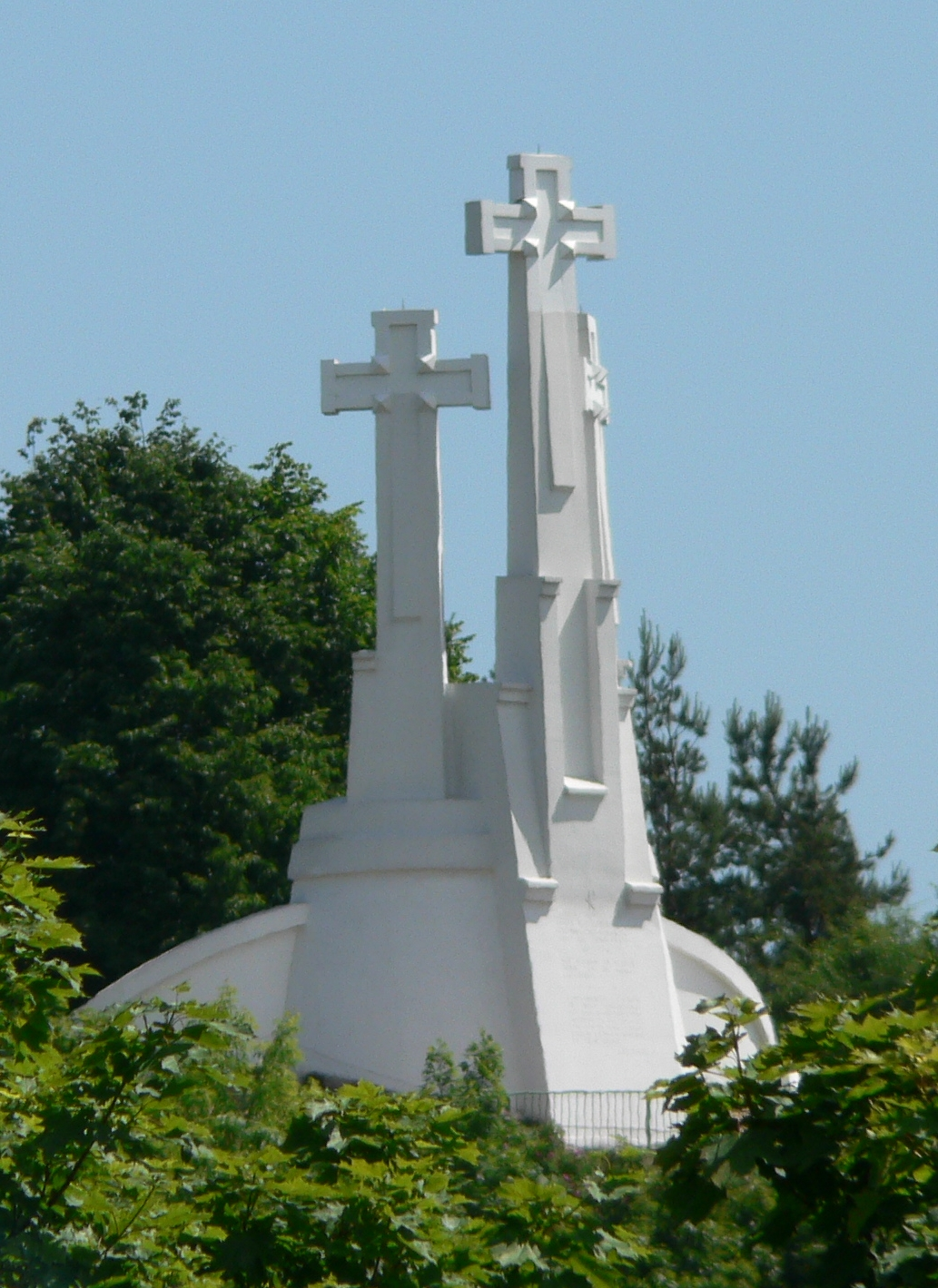
The original Three Crosses monument was dedicated to the Franciscan martyrs of Vilnius

Franciscan martyrs of Vilnius are 14 semi-legendary Franciscan friars murdered in Vilnius, capital of the Grand Duchy of Lithuania, during the reign of Algirdas (1345–77). The story was first recorded in the Bychowiec Chronicle, a generally unreliable source from the early 16th century, and was further embellished, conflated, and confused by later chroniclers and historians. Nonetheless, the cult of the martyrs spread in the 16th century. A prominent monument in Vilnius, the Three Crosses, was originally erected in their memory sometime before 1648. Around the same time Bishop Jerzy Tyszkiewicz started canonization procedures, but they were abandoned. At the advent of critical historiography in the 20th century, the story was dismissed as fictional in its entirety. However, newer research attempts to restore some credibility to the legend.

== Story in the Bychowiec Chronicle ==
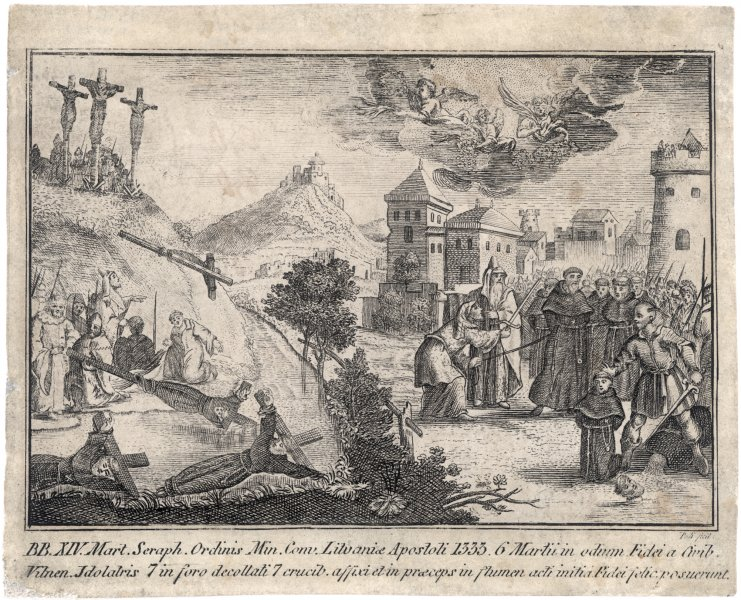
Illustration of the fourteen martyrs from 1803

As told by the Bychowiec Chronicle, Voivode of Vilnius Petras Goštautas married a Polish lady from the House of Buczacki and converted to Catholicism. He invited 14 Franciscan friars from Podolia to Vilnius and built them a friary. At the time the Grand Duchy of Lithuania was still a pagan country; it would convert to Christianity in 1387. The friars began preaching the Christian faith and badmouthing pagan gods. That angered city residents. While Algirdas was away at war with Moscow and Goštautas was away in Tykocin, the residents burned down the friary and killed the friars. Seven friars were beheaded while other seven where nailed to a cross and tossed into the Neris river. Upon their return, Goštautas provided proper burial to the slain men and Algirdas ordered execution of 500 city residents. Goštautas also founded a new friary (today's Church of the Assumption of the Blessed Virgin Mary).

The story was repeated by Maciej Stryjkowski (1547–1593), Albert Wijuk Kojałowicz (1609–1677), and other historians who added and modified various details. These authors increased the number of martyrs to 36, including Goštautas himself who was also a bishop, and dated the event in 1332 or 1333. Martinus Baronius (1602) provided not only names, but also titles and positions of the martyrs. Matters were so confused that some authors, including Kazimierz Biernacki and Antonius Melissanus de Macro, claimed that there were two separate incidents – one where 14 and another where 36 Franciscans were martyred.

== Cult of the martyrs ==
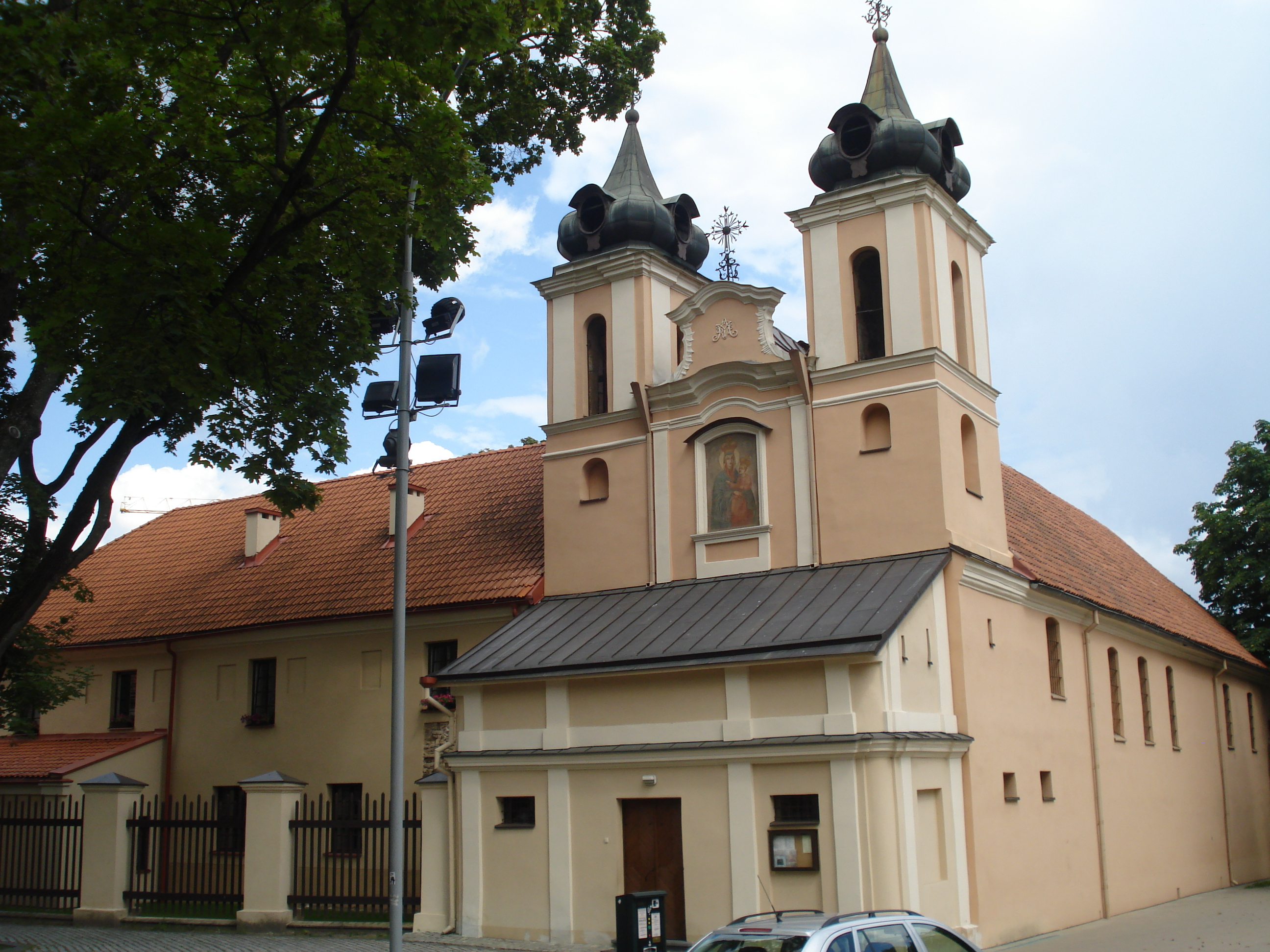
Present-day Church of the Holy Cross traces its roots to a 1543 chapel dedicated to the Franciscan martyrs

The first document mentioning the cult of the martyrs is a 1543 letter by Bishop Paweł Holszański. He described a monument – a column with a cross – that survived a major city fire that destroyed Vilnius Cathedral and Bishops' Palace in July 1530. He also attributed full recovery of severely ill Jan Andruszewicz, future Bishop of Kiev, to the intercession of the martyrs. Inspired by these events, in 1543, Holszański built a Gothic Chapel of the Holy Cross where the martyrs were allegedly buried. Two years later, Andruszewicz wrote a hymn to the martyrs which closely echoes information in the Bychowiec Chronicle. It was carved into a marble plaque and hung in the chapel. The hymn was also published in Annales Minorum by Luke Wadding. The chapel was restored in 1598 and eventually it grew into the Church of the Holy Cross.

Bishop Jerzy Tyszkiewicz started an official canonization case in 1649 and ordered a search of the remains of the martyrs. The results of the search are not known. It is likely that canonization efforts were abandoned due to the Russo-Polish War (1654–67) and Tyszkiewicz's death in 1656. Three wooden crosses were built on the Bleak Hill (now in Kalnai Park) where the martyrs were reportedly beheaded. The exact date of the construction is unknown, but it was possibly related to the efforts of canonization. The first undoubted representation is from a 1648 panegyric to Bishop Tyszkiewicz. According to Jan Nepomucen Fijałek, the Three Crosses were also depicted on two silver portraits of St. Casimir that were made in 1636 and were present in Vilnius Cathedral until the first half of the 20th century. Wooden crosses would rot and needed to be periodically replaced. Concrete monuments were erected in 1916 (architect Antoni Wiwulski; torn down in 1950) and 1989 (architect Henrikas Šilgalis).

== Analysis ==
=== Historical inaccuracies ===
The Bychowiec Chronicle provides a detailed description of the life of Petras Goštautas. He is not known from any other sources and details of his life cannot be reliably verified. Some of the details outright contradict facts known from other reliable contemporary sources. For example, Vilnius Voivodeship was established only in 1413 by Vytautas; therefore Goštautas could not be a voivode during the reign of Algirdas. But it could be a confusion with Jonas Goštautas who was the voivode in 1443–58. The chronicle also mentions that Goštautas was appointed as regent of Podolia by Algirdas; in fact it was Petras Mantigirdaitis who was appointed by Vytautas. Polish historian Kazimierz Chodynicki expressed doubts about Goštautas' marriage to a member of the House of Buczacki as the family came into prominence only after Algirdas' death. Goštautas is also not known as the founder of the Franciscan church and friary in Vilnius. The first more sizable donation by Goštautai to the Franciscans in Vilnius is known only from 1468. The Bychowiec Chronicle also mentions that the first Bishop of Vilnius was Motiejus, a friar from a local Franciscan friary. No such bishop is known; the first bishop was Andrzej Jastrzębiec.

=== Historical basis ===
Polish historian Kazimierz Chodynicki was the first to critically evaluate the story in 1927. He noted clear similarities between the story in the Bychowiec Chronicle and the story of two Franciscan martyrs first recorded in the Chronica XXIV Generalium, a Franciscan chronicle written around 1370, and repeated in Memoriale Ordinis Fratrum Minorum by Jan Komorowski. According to Chronica, two Czech friars, Ulrich and Martin, were murdered by Grand Duke Gediminas probably around 1341. One was tortured and murdered, another was tossed into the river to "float back to where he came from". Chodynicki concluded that the story in the Bychowiec Chronicle is nothing more than a fanciful embellishment of the story in Chronica and this conclusion was widely accepted. The story from Chronica is accepted by historians as authentic as the chronicle was produced within living memory of the events.

Viktoras Gidžiūnas was the first to note that De Conformitate Vitae B. P. Francisco, finished in 1390 by Bartholomew Rinonico and published in 1513 in Milan, contains a story of five Franciscans murdered in Vilnius. The laconic description notes that four friars were cut with swords while the guardian (head of the friary) had his hands, feet, and head partially cut off. Still alive, he was then put into a little boat; he drifted via the Neris and Neman to the territory of the Teutonic Knights. The same note mentioned two friars killed by the "same idolaters" in Siret, Moldavia, in 1378. English historian S. C. Rowell noted that the story in De Conformitate Vitae would fit in the context of a Lithuanian raid, possibly to avenge the murder of Yuri Koriatovich, into Moldavia in 1377. Additionally, Franciscan Andrzej Jastrzębiec was the first bishop of both Siret and Vilnius and thus could have provided his first-hand knowledge of both events. Therefore, Rowell concluded that De Conformitate Vitae proved that the event in the Bychowiec Chronicle did occur. The martyrdom in Vilnius is not dated in De Conformitate Vitae, but Marianus of Florence provided the date of 1369, which would fit perfectly with Bychowiec's note that the martyrs were murdered while Algirdas was at war with Moscow.

Darius Baronas agreed with Rowell that the event did occur, but clarified that the author of the Bychowiec Chronicle did not know about either Chronica or De Conformitate Vitae as there are no textual similarities between the works. He concluded that the story in the Bychowiec Chronicle stems from a real historical event that embellished with various fictional elements that served political needs of the chronicle's sponsors.

=== Political agenda ===
Overall, the chronicle highlights achievements of the Goštautai and Olshanski families, particularly of Jonas Goštautas. Therefore, scholars concluded that it was sponsored by a member of these families. Scholars proposed Grand Chancellor Albertas Goštautas, Bishop Paweł Holszański, and Duke Olelkovich. It is evident that the legend in the Bychowiec Chronicle had a clear political agenda to glorify the Goštautai family. In the chronicle, Goštautas is presented as a hero of the Christian faith: he is the first to marry a Polish lady and convert to Christianity, he is the first to bring Christian missionaries to Lithuania and build them a friary. All of these feats preceded Jogaila's marriage to Jadwiga of Poland in 1386 and official conversion in 1387 by two decades. In a way, according to the chronicle, Jogaila only continued the work started by Goštautas.

The chronicle also serves to increase prestige of Lithuanian Franciscans: it diminishes the role of the Poles in the christianization of Lithuania. The chronicle also mentions that the first Bishop of Vilnius was a friar from a local Franciscan friary founded by Goštautas. While historically incorrect (the first bishop was Andrzej Jastrzębiec, auxiliary bishop of the Diocese of Gniezno), it serves a clear political agenda to demonstrate independence of Lithuanian Franciscans. It aligns well with the efforts of Albertas Goštautas to separate Franciscans in the Grand Duchy of Lithuania from the Franciscan Province of Poland. He succeeded in 1530, which is around the time that the Bychowiec Chronicle was produced.

=== Religious symbolism ===
Baronas analyzed the legend looking for religious symbolism. He identified some parallels between Saint Peter and Petras Goštautas, the Seven Deacons and the fourteen martyrs. Other allusions could be the Fourteen Holy Helpers or the seven martyrs in 2 Maccabees 7:1-42. An interesting parallel was drawn by Antoni Grzybowski in 1740: he compared seven priests who destroyed the walls of Jericho with trumpets of ram's horn in Joshua 6: 1-21 with the Franciscan priests who silenced the howling devil (i.e. the Iron Wolf) with the Good News of God.
