= Martyrs of Vilnius =

The martyrs of Vilnius may refer to:

- Anthony, John, and Eustathios, three Orthodox monks murdered in Vilnius (possibly in 1347)
- Franciscan martyrs of Vilnius, 14 Catholic monks murdered in Vilnius (possibly around 1369)
