= Daniel and companions =

Friars Minor and martyrs

Saint Daniel and Companions
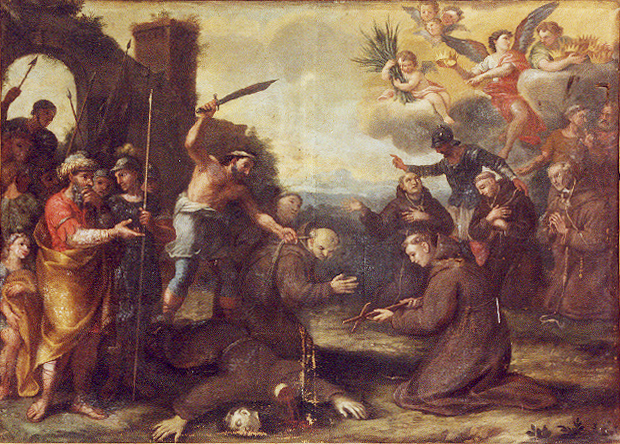

Franciscan Martyrs
- Died: October 10, 1227; Ceuta, Spain
- Venerated in: Roman Catholicism
- Canonized: 1516 by Leo X
- Feast: October 13

Daniel and companions were seven Friars Minor martyred at Ceuta on 10 October 1227, according to the Chronicle of the Twenty-Four Generals of the Order of Friars Minor (c. 1370). Their story is likely a legend or fabrication. The names of Daniel's companions are borrowed from the authentic account of the martyrdom of Berard of Carbio and his companions in 1220.

Daniel and his companions are venerated as saints by the Catholic Church.

== Story ==
The martyrdom of Berard of Carbio and his companions in 1219 had inflamed many of the religious of the Order of Friars Minor with the desire of preaching the gospel in non-Christian lands; and in 1227, the year following Francis of Assisi's death, six religious of Tuscany, Agnellus (Agnello), Samuel, Donulus, Leo, Hugolinus (Ugolino), and Nicholas, petitioned Elias of Cortona, then vicar-general of the Order, for permission to preach the gospel to the Muslims of the Maghreb.

The six missionaries went first to Spain, where they were joined by Daniel, Minister Provincial of Calabria, who became their superior. They set sail from Spain and on 20 September reached the coast of Africa, where they remained for a few days in a small village inhabited mostly by Christian merchants just beyond the walls of the Saracen city of Ceuta.

Finally, very early on Sunday morning, they entered the city, and immediately began to preach the gospel and to denounce Islam. They were soon apprehended and brought before the sultan who, thinking that they were mad, ordered them to be cast into prison. Here they remained until the following Sunday when they were again brought before the sultan, who, by promises and threats, endeavoured in vain to make them deny the Christian religion. They were all executed as each one approached Daniel, the superior, to ask his blessing and permission to die for Christ. They were all beheaded.

Daniel and his companions were canonized by Leo X in 1516. Their feast is kept in the Franciscan Order on the thirteenth of October.
