= Three Crosses =

Monument in Vilnius, Lithuania

Three Crosses hill
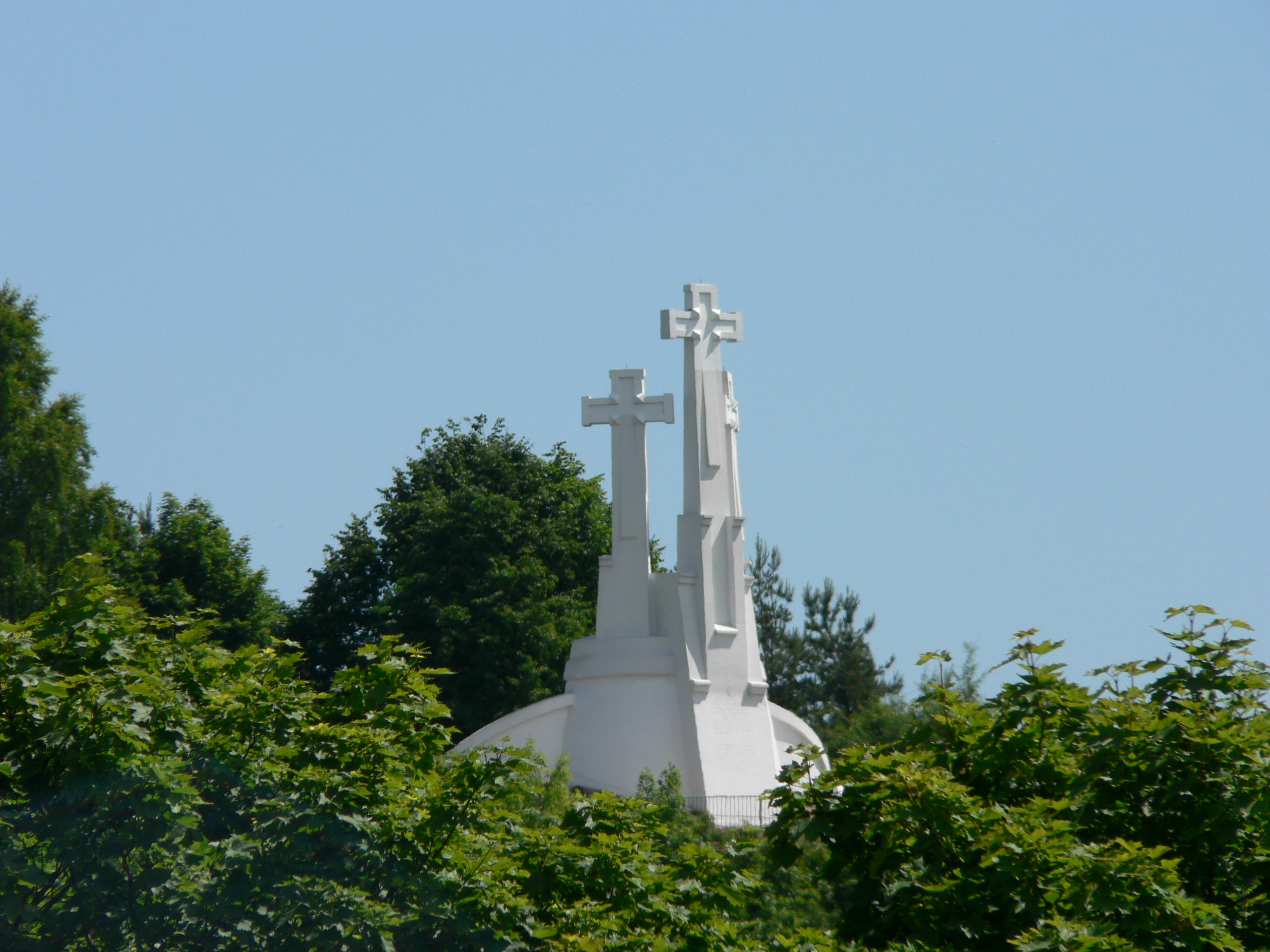
- Three Crosses on the Bald Hill

Highest point
- Elevation: 165 m (541 ft)
- Prominence: 76 m (249 ft)
- Coordinates: 54°41′11″N 25°17′51″E

Geography
- Location: Vilnius

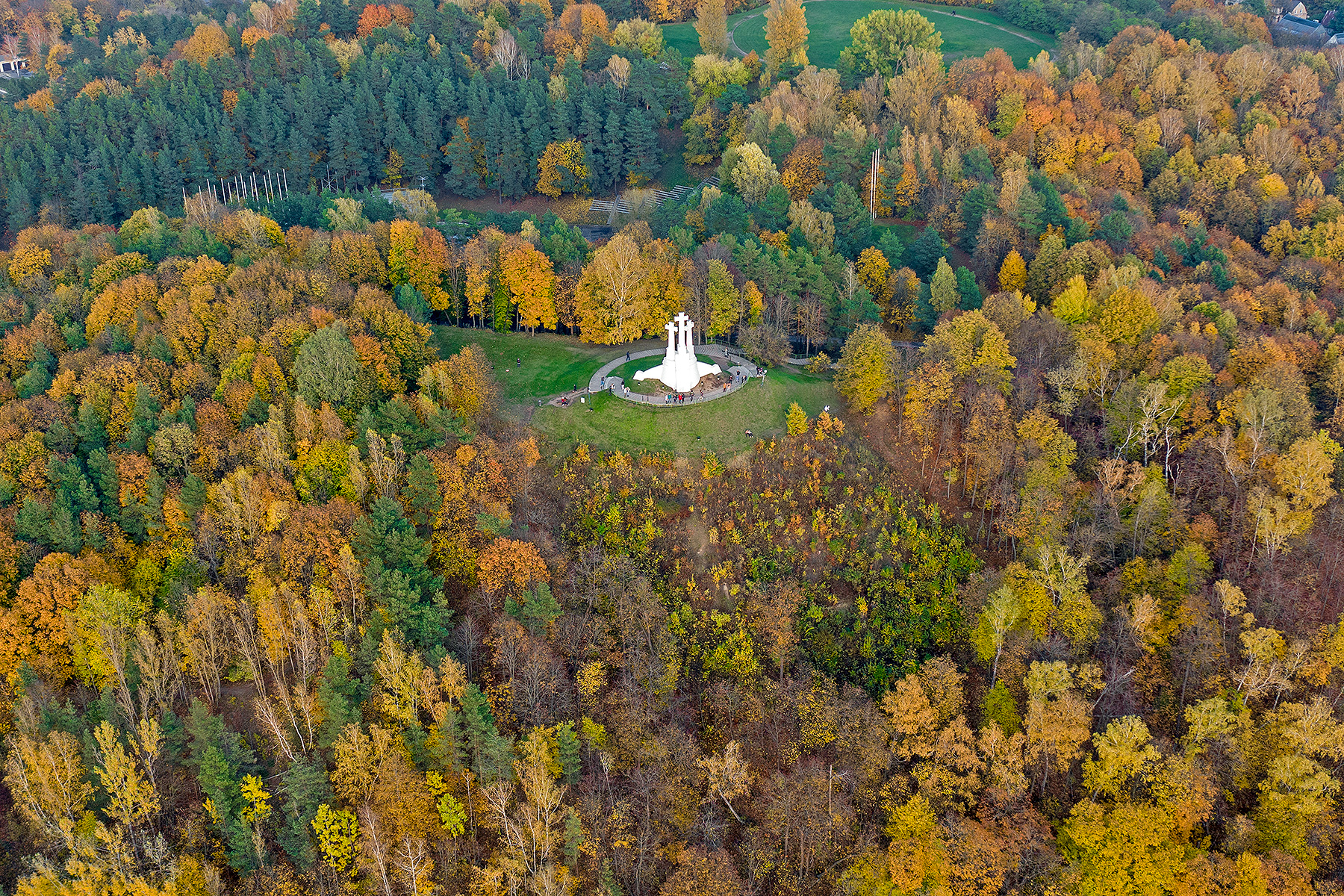
Aerial view

Three Crosses (Lithuanian: Trys kryžiai) is a prominent monument in Vilnius, Lithuania, on the Hill of Three Crosses (Lithuanian: Trijų Kryžių kalnas), also known as the Bald Hill (Lithuanian: Plikasis kalnas) or Crooked Hill (lt:Kreivasis kalnas), in Kalnai Park. According to a legend, which finds its source in some historic events, seven Franciscan friars were beheaded on top of this hill. Wooden crosses have been sited in the location since the early 17th century, and they became a symbol of the city and an integral part of the city's skyline.

As the wood rotted, the crosses needed to be periodically replaced. In 1916, a concrete monument was designed by Polish–Lithuanian architect and sculptor Antoni Wiwulski or Antanas Vivulskis in Lithuanian. It was torn down in 1950 by order of the Soviet authorities. A new monument created by Stanislovas Kuzma after the design by Henrikas Šilgalis was erected in its place in 1989. The monument was depicted on 50 litas banknote. A panorama of the Vilnius Old Town can be observed from a small observation deck at the base of the crosses.

== Legend ==
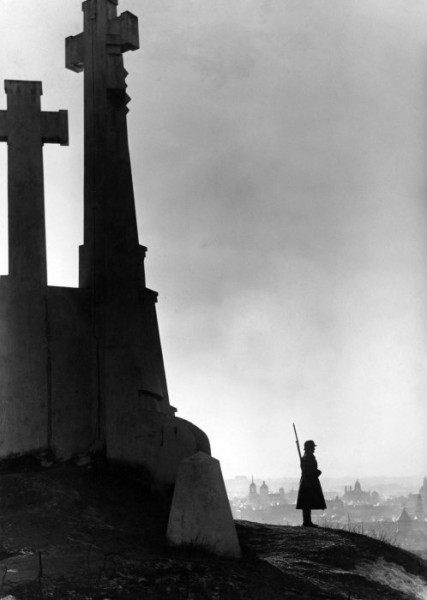
Lithuanian Guard of Honor near the Three Crosses in 1939

According to the Bychowiec Chronicle, fourteen Franciscan friars were invited to Vilnius from Podolia by Petras Goštautas. The friars publicly preached the gospel and badmouthed Lithuanian gods. Angered city residents burned the monastery and killed all fourteen friars. Seven of them were beheaded on the Bleak Hill; the other seven were crucified and thrown into the Neris or Vilnia River. Historians debate the factual accuracy of the story. It could be an embellishment of a story from Chronica XXIV Generalium about two Franciscans murdered around 1340. It could also be an embellishment of a story from De Conformitate Vitae B. P. Francisco by Bartholomew Rinonico about five Franciscans martyrs. If the latter is the case, the event most likely occurred in 1369.

== History ==
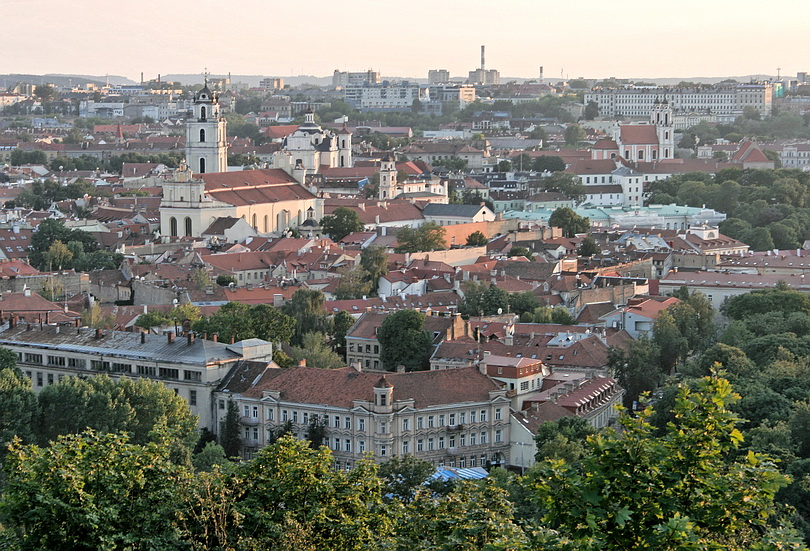
Vilnius Old Town as seen from the top of the hill

Regardless of whether the legend about the Franciscan martyrs is true or not, their story spread from the early 16th century. The original wooden Three Crosses were built on the Bleak Hill, the place where seven friars were beheaded, sometime before 1649. That is the year when the crosses were depicted in a panegyric to Bishop Jerzy Tyszkiewicz. Around the same time Tyszkiewicz began a case to canonize the fourteen friars. There is some evidence that the crosses were built before 1636 as, according to Jan Nepomucen Fijałek, the crosses were also depicted on two silver portraits of St. Casimir that were made in 1636 and hung in Vilnius Cathedral. However, the portraits did not survive and Fijałek's claim cannot be verified.

The wooden crosses collapsed in 1869 and Tsarist authorities did not allow to rebuild them. The new monument from reinforced concrete designed by Antoni Wiwulski was erected in August 1916, while Vilnius was occupied by the Germans during World War I. The monument was demolished by Soviet authorities on May 30, 1950. Residents of Vilnius wanted them restored. During the Lithuanian independence movement, the monument was rebuilt on the old foundations by sculptor Stanislovas Kuzma according to the project of sculptor Henrikas Šilgalis. The monument was unveiled on 14 June 1989. The rebuilt crosses now are 1.8 metres (5 ft 11 in) higher than those of 1916. Broken pieces of the old monument can be seen several meters below the rebuilt monument.

== See also ==
- Hill of Crosses
