= Bykhovets =

Bykhovets or Bychowiec is a gender-neutral Slavic surname. Notable people with the surname include:

- Aleksander Bychowiec, Russian-Polish noble and an amateur historian, author of Bychowiec Chronicle
- Vassili Samarsky-Bykhovets (1803–1870), Russian mining engineer
