= Stanislovas Kuzma =

Lithuanian sculptor (1947–2012)

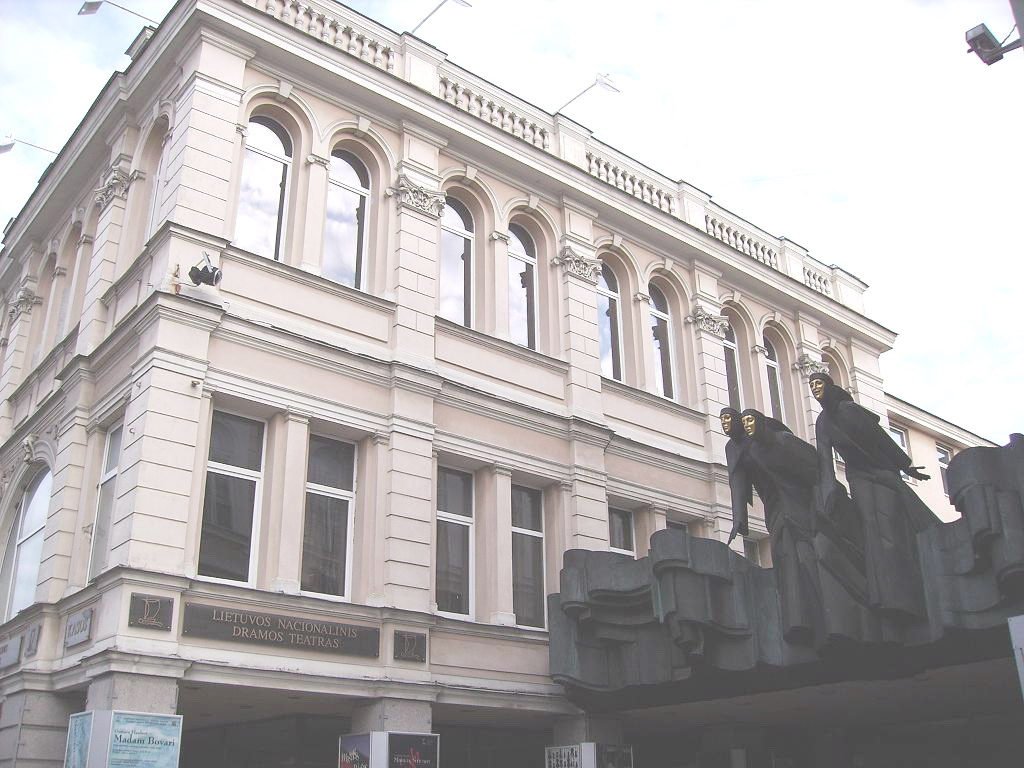
S. Kuzma, "Mūzų šventė" ("Festivity of Muses")

Stanislovas Kuzma (May 7, 1947 in Panevėžys, Lithuania – August 14, 2012 in Vilnius, Lithuania) was a Lithuanian sculptor. His works include decorative sculptures, monuments, small sculptures, sculptural portraits, tombstones, memorials, and medals. Among them are works on sacred subjects. He worked with stone, wood, and metal, often combining materials.

His works were exhibited in various places in Lithuania and abroad and are owned by various museums, including the Lithuanian National Museum of Art, the Tretyakov Gallery in Moscow, and the Olympic Museum in Lausanne.

== Works ==
In total, Stanislovas Kuzma created over 200 sculptures and monuments.

=== Mūzų šventė ===
"Mūzų šventė" ("Festivity of Muses", also known as "Feast of Muses", or "Three Muses") is a sculpture group (copper sheets, gilding) of three female figures in shawls portraying Drama (Calliope), Comedy (Thalia) and Tragedy (Melpomene) on the façade of the Lithuanian National Drama Theatre.

The sculpture group has become a prominent city landmark, and a scissor lift was installed to bring tourists closer to the sculptures.

The middle sculpture has a prototype, Dr. Irena Žukauskiene, cardiac surgeon, who saved Kuzma's life.

=== Lazarus, Arise! ===
In addition to the sculpture of a muse, there was another work planned by Kuzma to thank his doctors, the sculpture "Lazarus, Arise!" (Lithuanian: Lozoriau, kelkis!), designed in 1989. Unfortunately, Kuzma passed away before materializing his idea. The sculpture to his plans was created by his son, Algirdas Kuzma, and architect Rolandas Palekas, and in 2016 it was unveiled on the grounds of the Santariškės Clinic of the hospital of Vilnius University.

=== City Gatekeeper ===
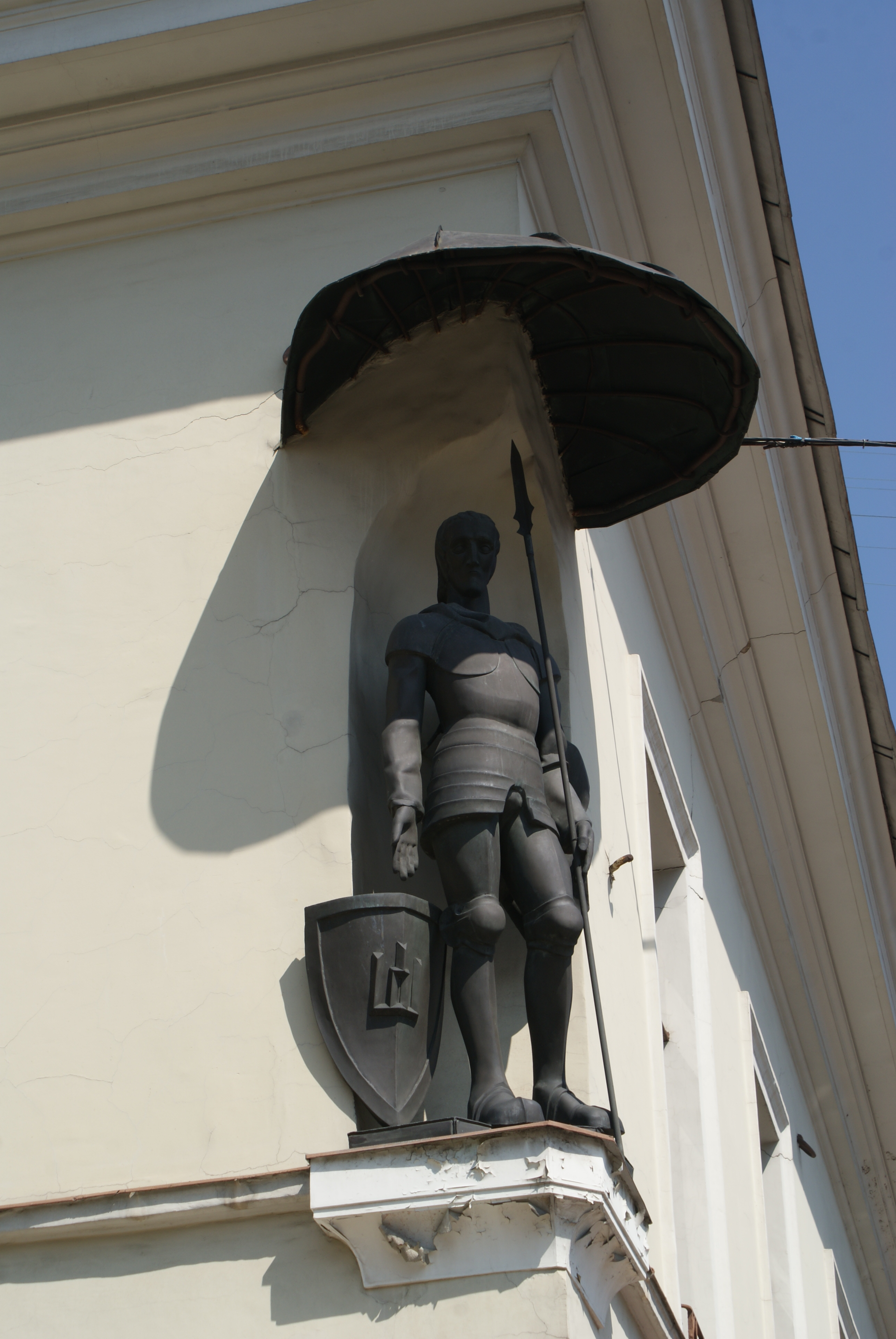
"City Gatekeeper"

"City Gatekeeper" (Lithuanian: "Miesto vartų sargybinis") is a 1973 diploma work by Kuzma for his graduation from the Vilnius Art Institute. It is located in a niche of the Umiastowski Palace at the corner of Trakų and Pylimo Streets in Vilnius Old Town. Initially it was a decorative piece made of wood; now it is made of copper. It is a "talking sculpture"; narration by Arūnas Sakalauskas can be listened to by a smartphone after scanning the QR code or entering the URL specified on the tablet at the pedestal of the sculpture. Kuzma modelled the face of the sculpture after his friend, graphic artist Rimtautas Gibavičius.

=== Pediment sculptures of Vilnius Cathedral ===
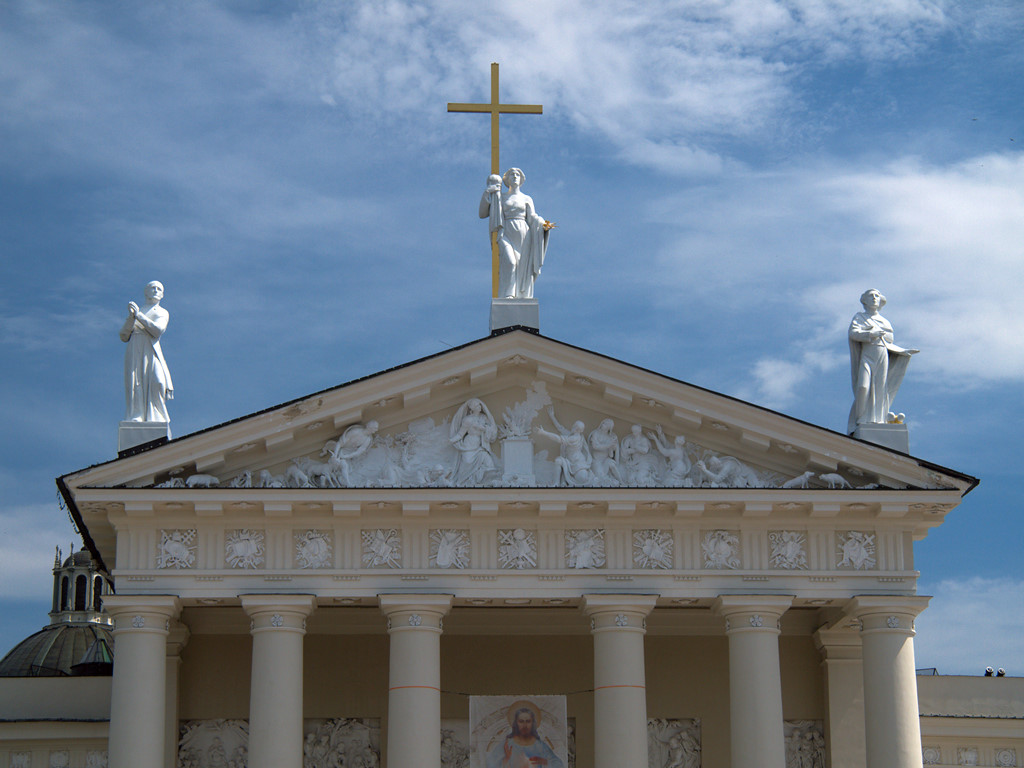
Vilnius Cathedral

Between 1786 and 1792 three sculptures by Kazimierz Jelski were placed on the roof of Vilnius Cathedral: Saint Casimir on the south side, Saint Stanislaus on the north, and Saint Helena in the centre. These sculptures were removed in 1950 by the Soviet powers and restored by Stanislovas Kuzma in 1997. Presumably, the sculpture of Saint Casimir originally symbolized Lithuania, that of Saint Stanislaus symbolized Poland, and that of Saint Helena holding a golden cross 9 metres high represents the True Cross.

=== Pieta, Antakalnis Cemetery ===
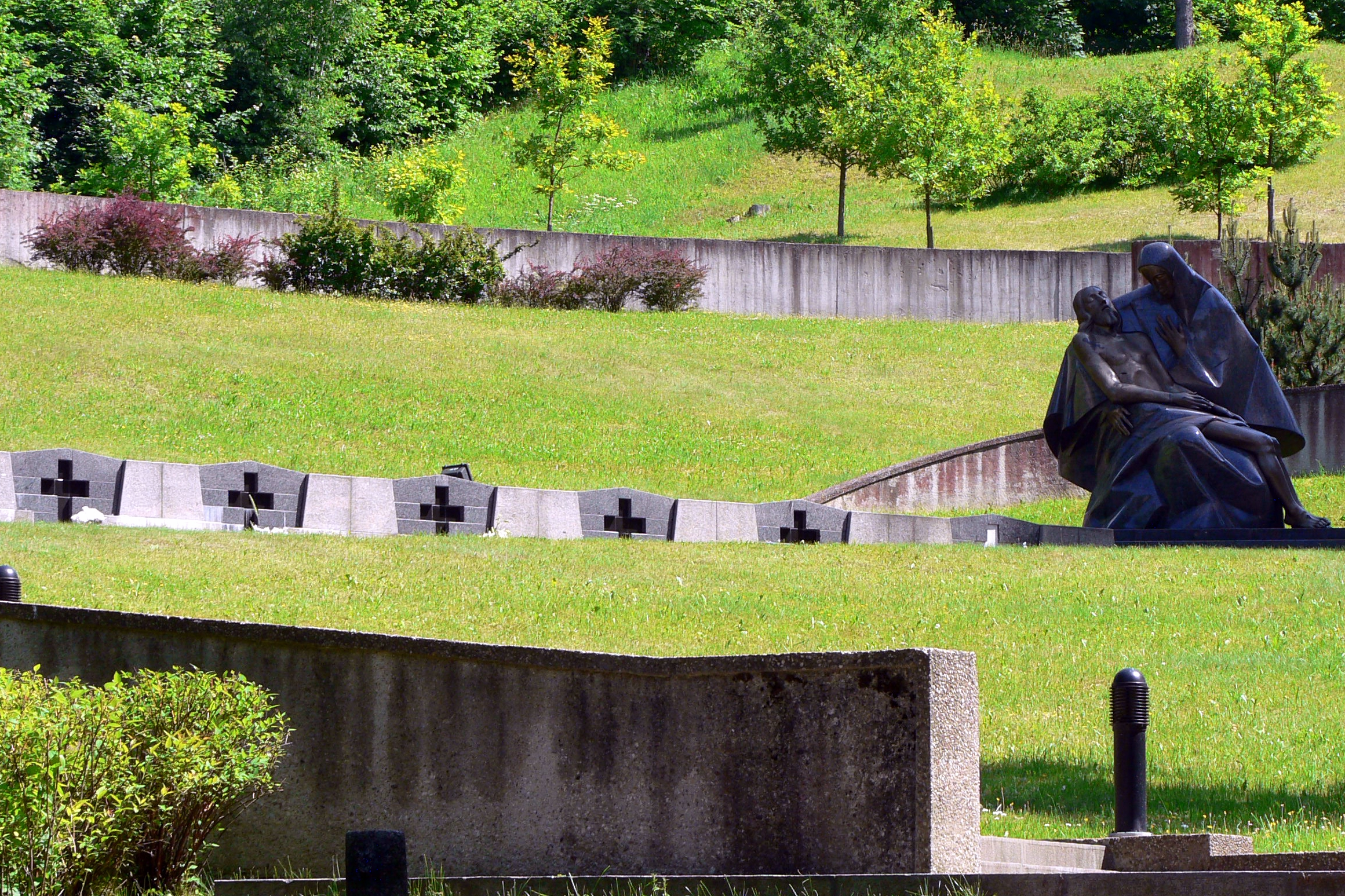
"Pieta"

In 1995 the monument "Pieta" by S. Kuzma (bronze, granite) at the center of the memorial to the victims of the January Events was unveiled at the Antakalnis Cemetery.

=== Monument to Alexander Jagiellon, Panevėžys ===
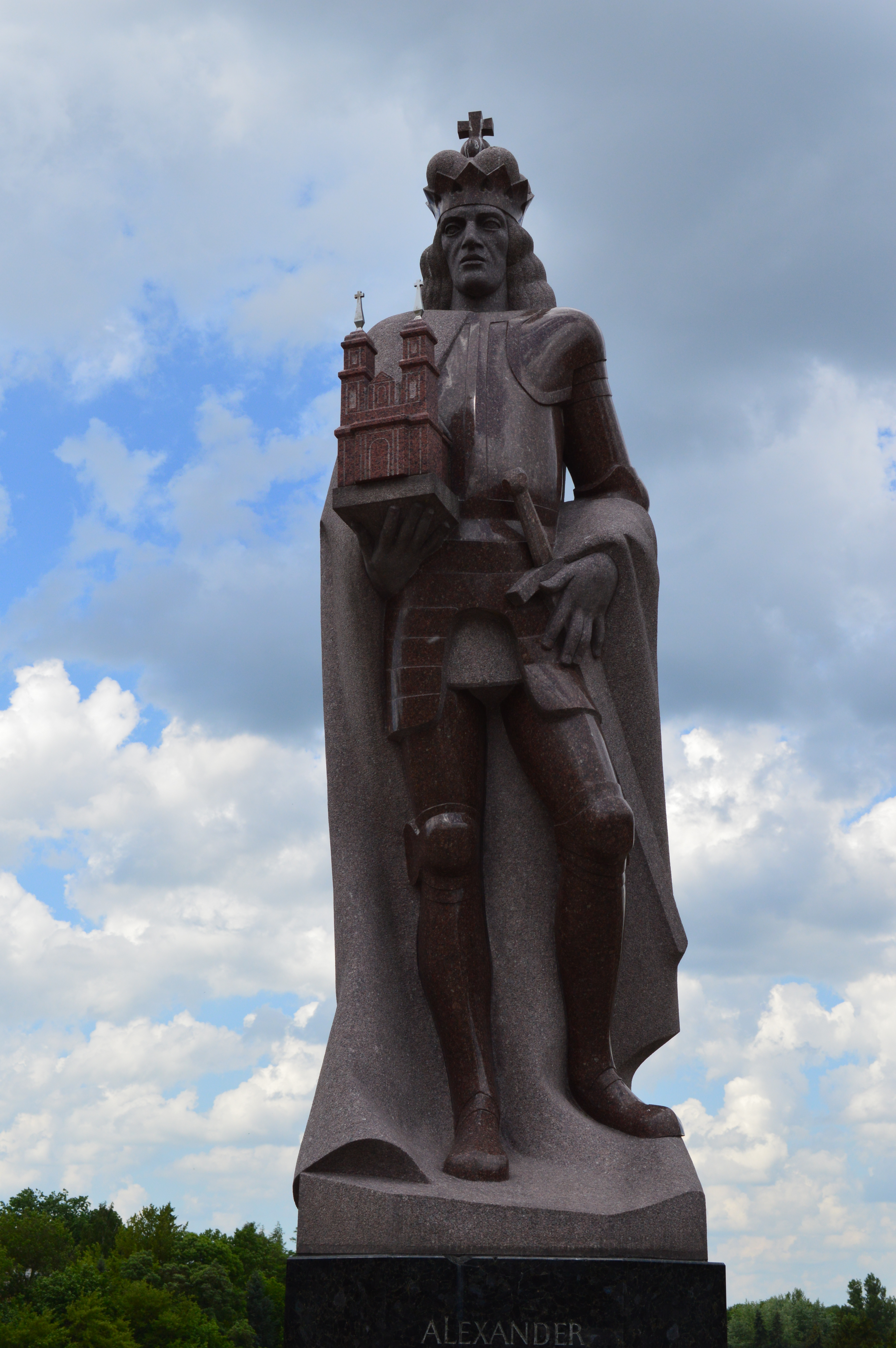
Alexander Jagiellon

Panevėžys was first mentioned evidently on 7 September 1503 in documents signed by the Grand Duke Alexander Jagiellon, who granted the town building rights to construct a church and other structures. Therefore, Alexander Jagiellon is considered as the founder of the city, which celebrated its 500th anniversary in 2003; two monuments were built in the city for this anniversary, one of which, by Stanislovas Kuzma, is dedicated to Alexander Jagiellon.

The monument made of granite is located in the northern part of the Freedom Square near the Nevėžys oxbow lake (Lithuanian: Nevėžys senvagė) of the Senvagė city district. On his right palm Grand Duke holds St. Peter and St. Paul's Church of Panevėžys.

=== Three Crosses ===
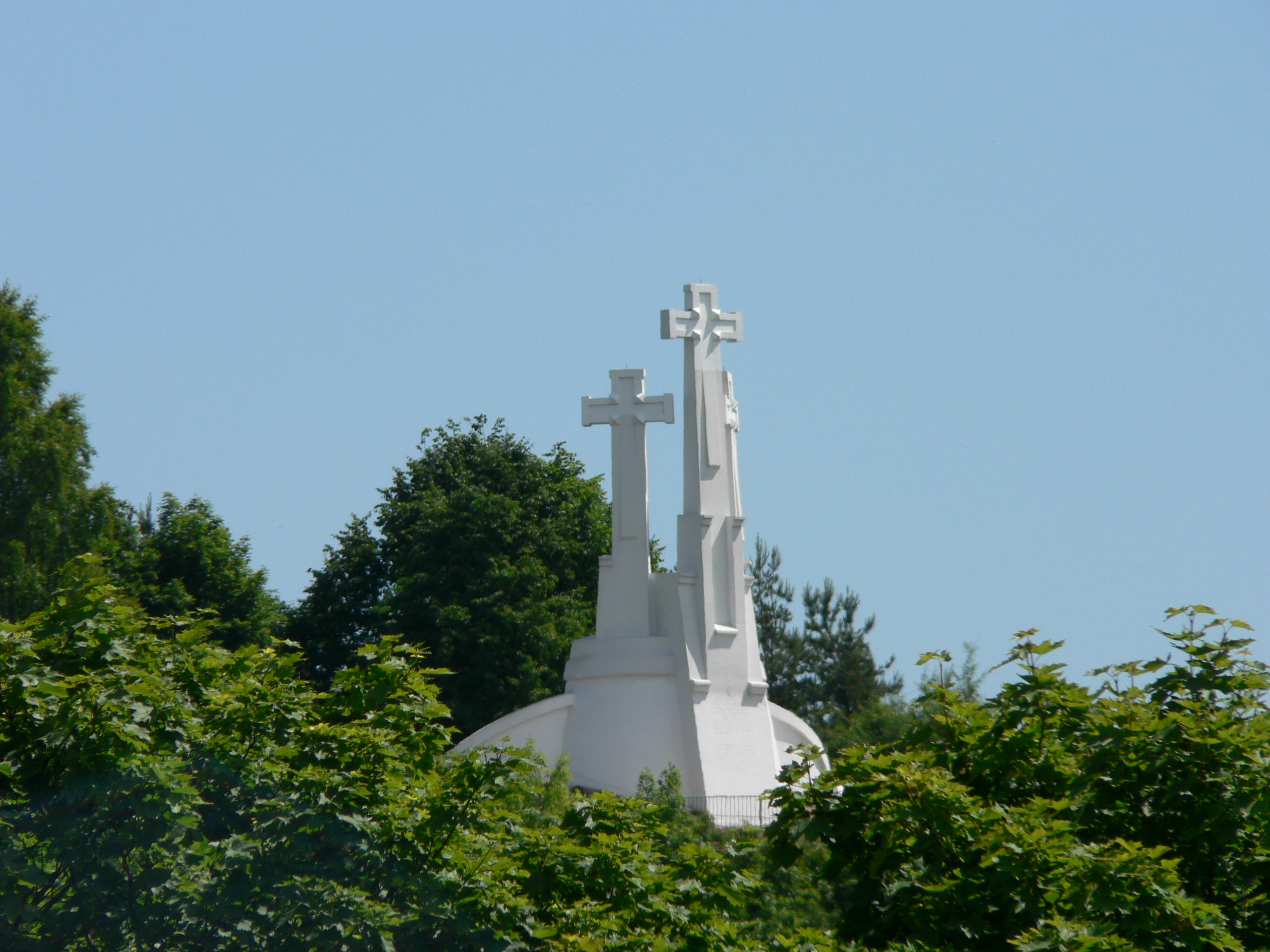
Three Crosses

There used to be wooden crosses of the Bald Hill, now known as the Hill of Three Crosses in Kalnai Park, Vilnius. In 1916, a concrete monument was designed by Polish–Lithuanian architect and sculptor Antoni Wiwulski or Antanas Vivulskis in Lithuanian. It was demolished in 1950 by Soviet authorities. A new monument created by Stanislovas Kuzma after the design by Henrikas Šilgalis was erected in its place in 1989. The monument can be seen on 50 litas banknotes, issues 1998 and 2003.

== Commemoration ==
A documentary film "Sculptor Stanislovas Kuzma" was created about S. Kuzma (directed by Juozas Matonis and Vytautas Damaševičius, 1995 and 1998). In 2011, R. Paknys publishing house published the album "Stanislovas Kuzma", the first comprehensive publication about his work. Among other things, it includes photographs of sculptures and Kuzma's recollections and documentary photographs. A number of sculptor's works ("Šaulys" ("The Archer"), "Mūzų šventė", "Žirgas ir sakalas" (The Horse and the Falcon), "Eglė, Žilvinas, jų vaikai" ("Eglė, Žilvinas, and Their Children", from the Lithuanian folk tale Eglė the Queen of Serpents), "Sutartinė" (sutartinė is a type of Lithuanian polyphonic song) and others) are included into the Register of Cultural Values of Lithuania.

== Awards and decorations ==
- 2007: St. Christopher's statuette award from city of Vilnius for his services to the art
- 1997: Commander's Cross of the Order of the Lithuanian Grand Duke Gediminas
- 1996: Lithuanian National Prize for Culture and Arts
- 1988: Medal and diploma from the Lithuanian Union of Architects
- 1987: Honoured Art Worker of Lithuanian SSR
- 1982: Lithuanian SSR State Prize
