= Aleksander Bychowiec =

Aleksander Bychowiec of Mogiła (Russian: Александр Иосифович Быховец) was a Russian-Polish noble and of the Russian Empire from the Grodno Governorate.

He is best known as the namesake of the so-called Bychowiec Chronicle, a 16th-century text related to the history of the Grand Duchy of Lithuania, discovered in his library in the 19th century.

== Family ==
- Casimir
- Stanislaw Joseph Daniel (1829-1883), a Major General of the Russian Imperial Army
