= Arnald of Sarrant =

Arnald of Sarrant (French: Arnaud de Sarrant) was a Franciscan friar and author. A native of Sarrant and a master of theology, he served as the minister provincial of Aquitaine from around 1361 until 1383. On 19 August 1373, Pope Gregory XI sent him to Castile in the aftermath of the Castilian Civil War (1351–1369) to reform the friaries of the Franciscans and Poor Clares. Under his authority on this mission were Diego de Palencia, Juan Gonsalvo de Ceuta and Juan de Úbeda.

Arnald was the author of The Kinship of Saint Francis (De cognatione sancti Francisci), completed after 1365, and probably also of the Chronicle of the Twenty-Four Generals of the Order of Friars Minor, which was completed by 1374. According to Bartholomew of Pisa, who used the Kingship for his Book of Conformities, Arnald "was a man of praiseworthy life and talent, who transcribed everything he could find about blessed Francis." The Kinship introduced the nine conformities of Francis of Assisi's life to the life of Jesus and thus marks a turning point in the hagiography of Francis. Arnald notes that Francis's great grand-niece was still young in 1365 and one of his great grand-nephews had died in the Black Death in 1349.
