= Mogiła coat of arms =

Polish coat of arms

Mogiła
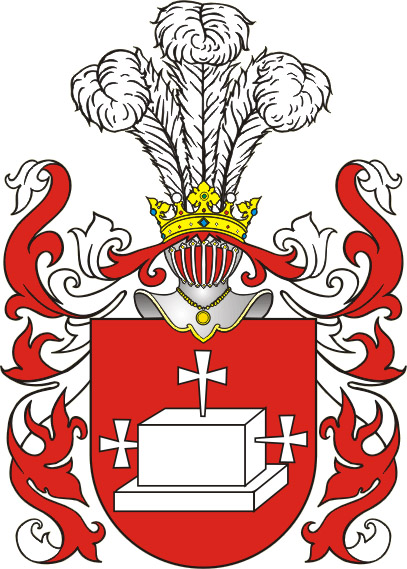
- Earliest mention: unknown
- Towns: none
- Families: Andruszewicz, Andruszkiewicz, Białowolski, Bichowski, Bielewicz, Billewicz, Bogarewicz, Bogdanowicz, Bohdanowicz, Bublewski, Bychowiec, Ciechanowicz, Czernicki, Daugiert, Daugird, Dawgird, Dawgirt, Dowgird, Dowgirdowicz, Dworzecki, Karczewski, Łopato, Łopatto, Maruchowicz, Maruszewski, Mogień, Monstwił, Monstwiłło, Montwid, Montwit, Mostwił, Rukiewicz, Sołouch, Sołuch, Stankiewicz, Szajewski, Wysocki, Zadeyko, Zodejko, Zodeyko, Zygmanowski, Żadeyko, Żodejko,

Mogiła (Polish for "Tomb") is a Polish coat of arms. It was used by a number of szlachta (noble) families under the Polish–Lithuanian Commonwealth.

== Notable bearers ==
Notable bearers of this coat of arms have included:

== See also ==
- Polish heraldry
- Heraldry
- Coat of arms
