= Church of the Holy Cross, Vilnius =

Roman Catholic church in Vilnius, Lithuania

Church of the Holy Cross Šv. Kryžiaus bažnyčia
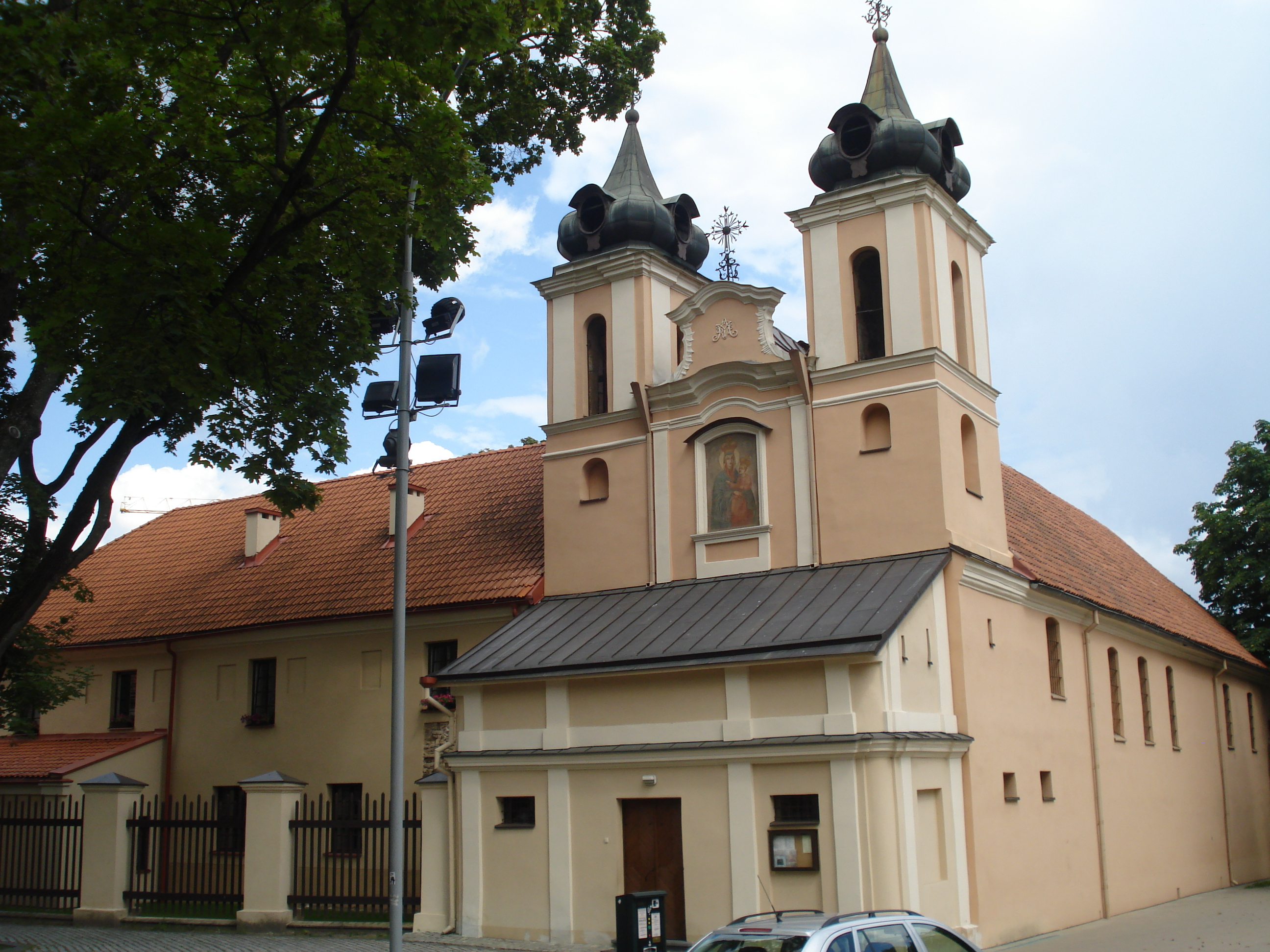
- Façade of the church in 2007

Religion
- Affiliation: Roman Catholic
- Diocese: Vilnius Old Town
- Ecclesiastical or organizational status: Used as a church
- Leadership: Roman Catholic Archdiocese of Vilnius

Location
- Location: Vilnius, Lithuania
- Interactive map of Church of the Holy Cross; Šv. Kryžiaus bažnyčia
- Coordinates: 54°41′2″N 25°17′5.5″E

Architecture
- Type: Church
- Style: Baroque
- Completed: 1543 (chapel), 1725 (current towers)
- Materials: Plastered masonry

Church of the Holy Cross (Lithuanian: Šv. Kryžiaus bažnyčia) is a Roman Catholic church in the Vilnius Old Town. Initially, in 1543 a chapel was built which was later expanded and rebuilt. The current towers were built in 1725. Following the fire in 1737 the church was reconstructed and a late baroque interior was installed.

A former monastery complex of the Brothers Hospitallers of Saint John of God is nearby the church.

The church is famous for a spring with miraculous water in its basement (people believe that this water cures eye diseases) and a painting of Mary, mother of Jesus, which bestows favors.

== Gallery ==
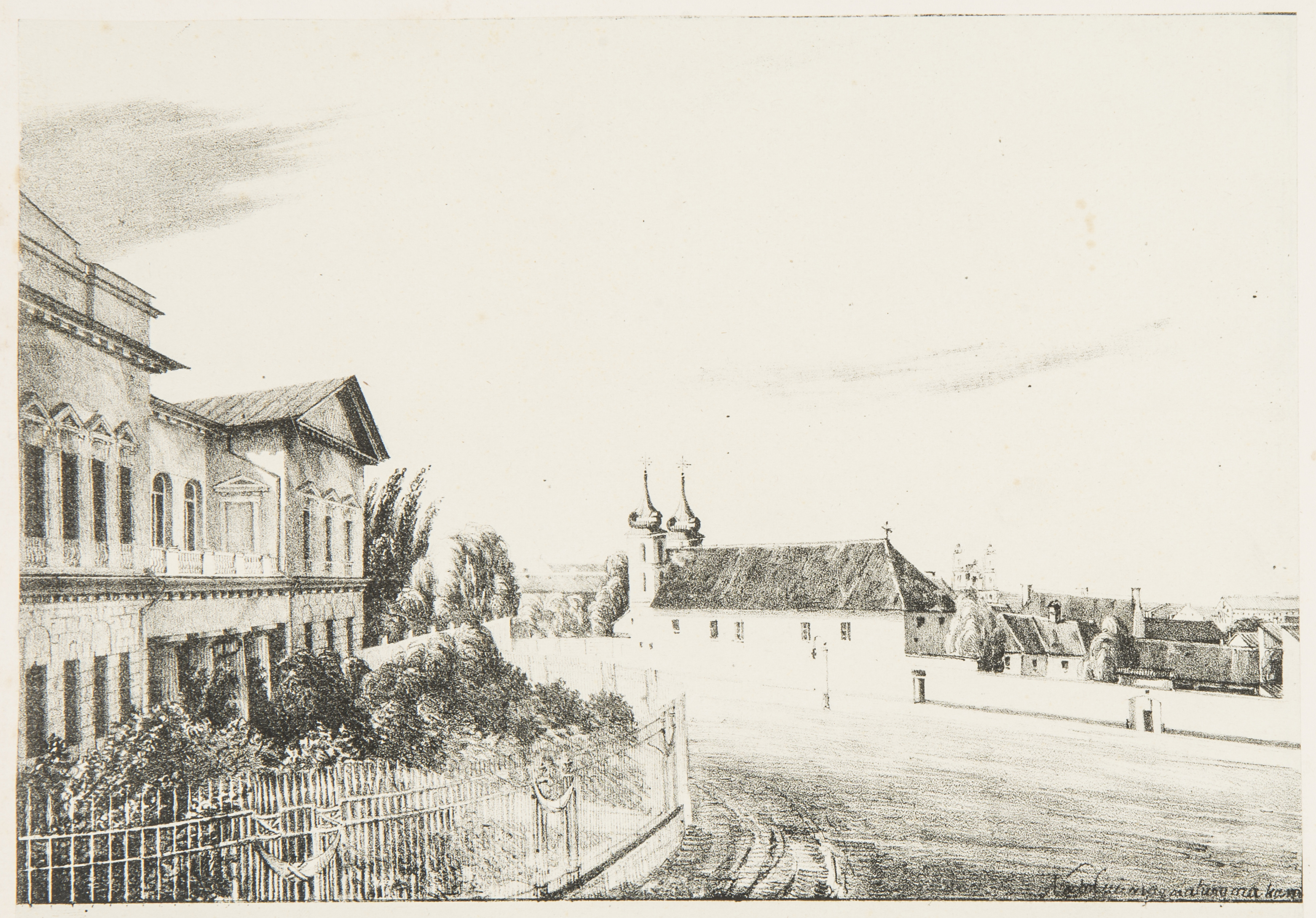
Painting of the church, 1812

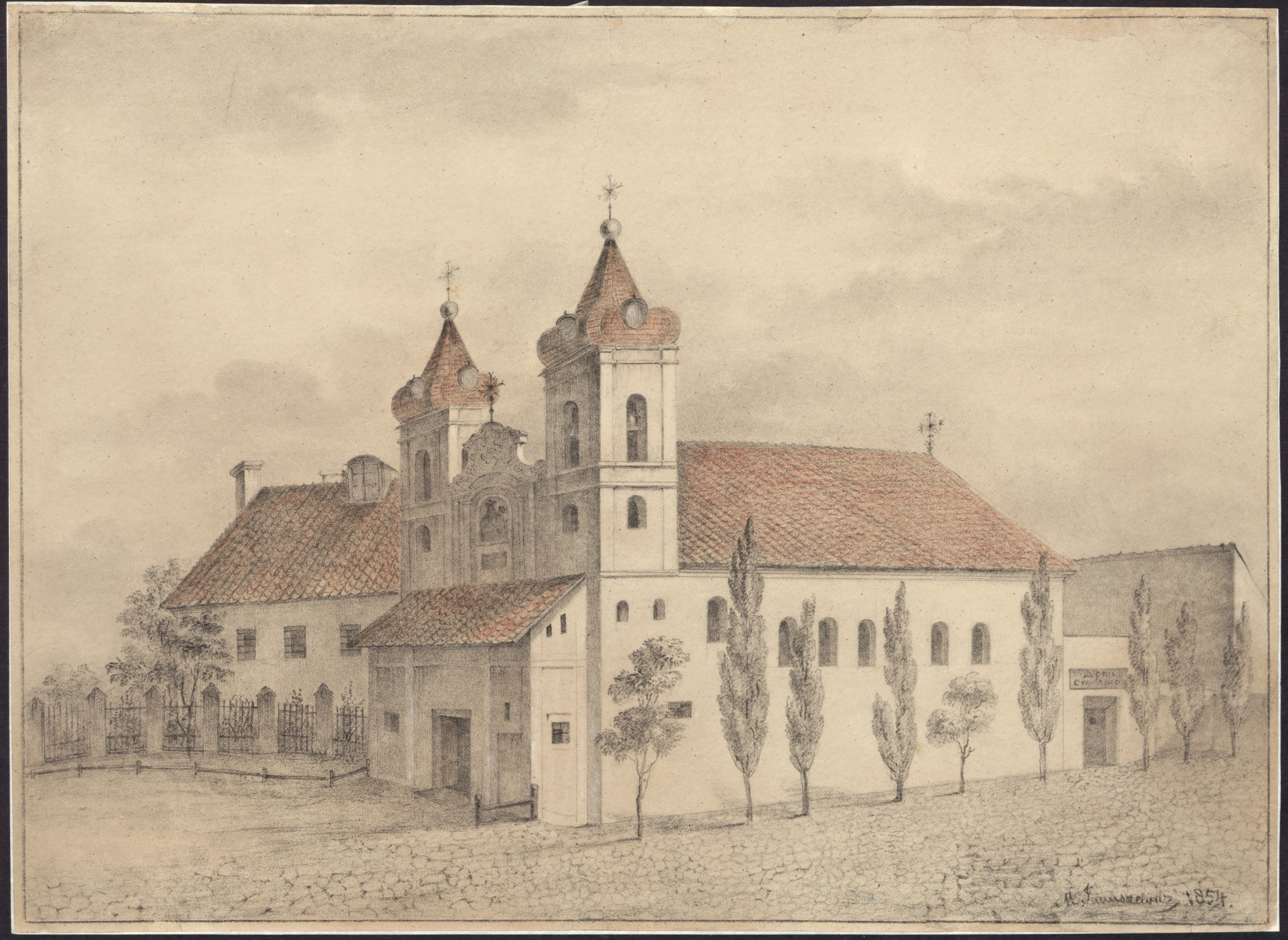
Painting of the church, 1854

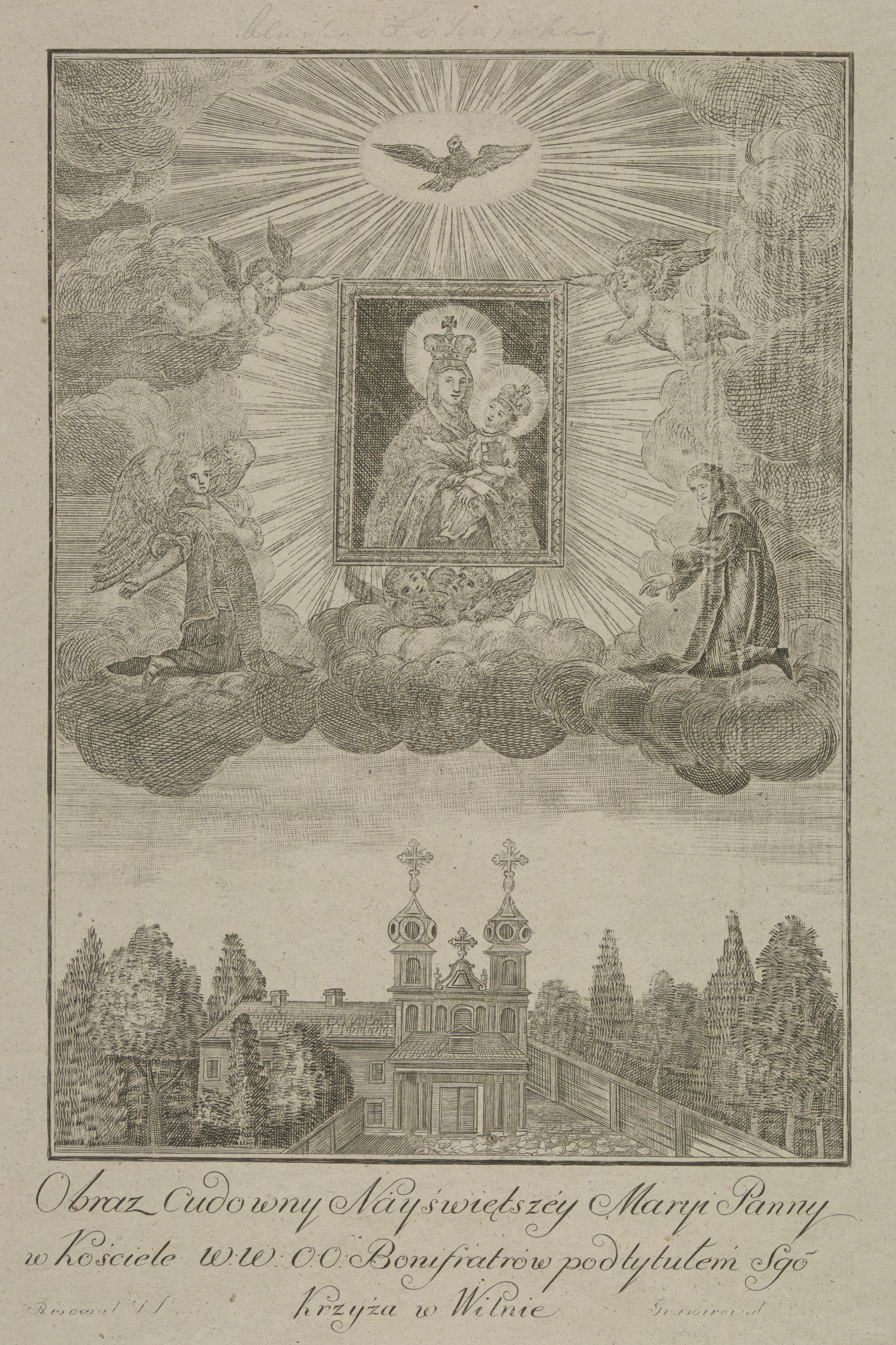
Painting of the church and its holy painting of Mary, 19th century

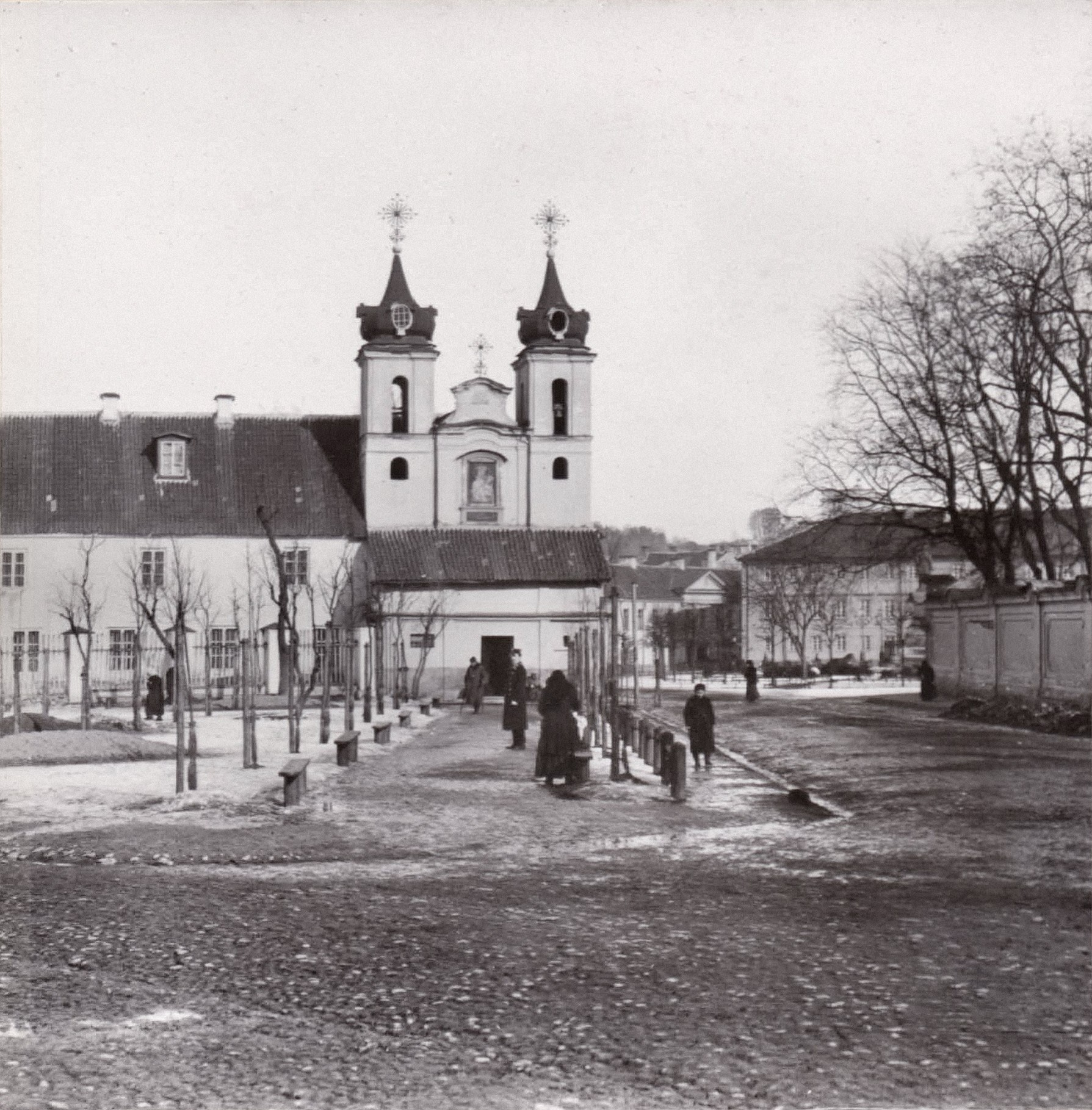
Photo of the church, 1900

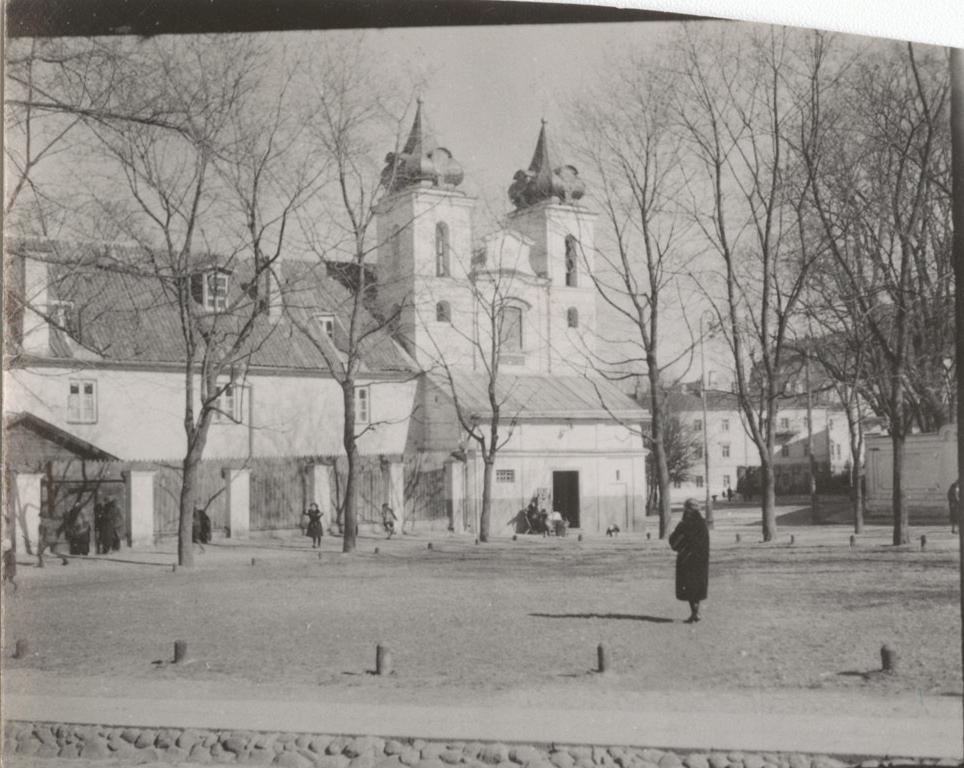
Photo of the church in the interwar period

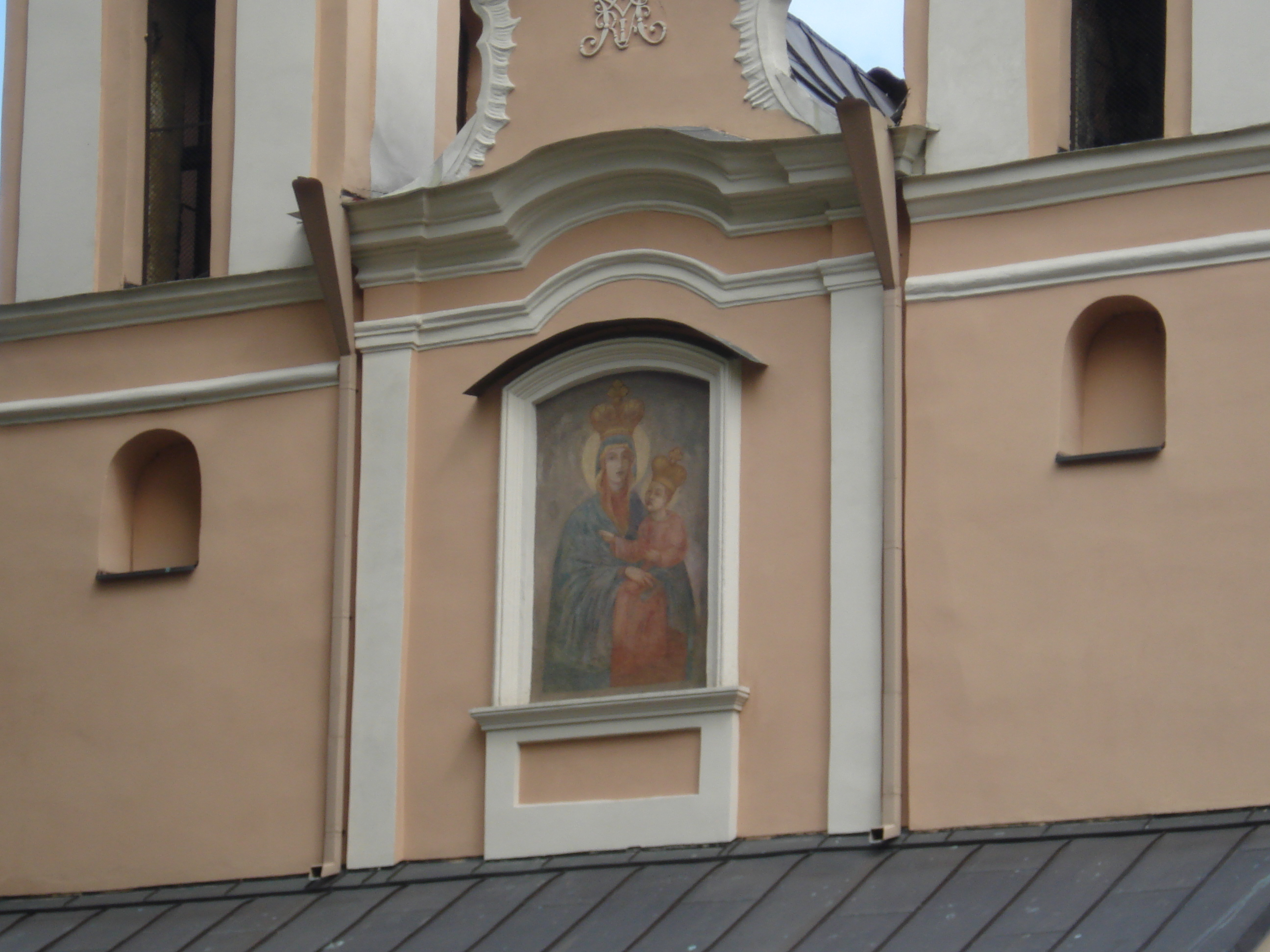
Copy of the holy painting of Mary on the façade of the church in 2007

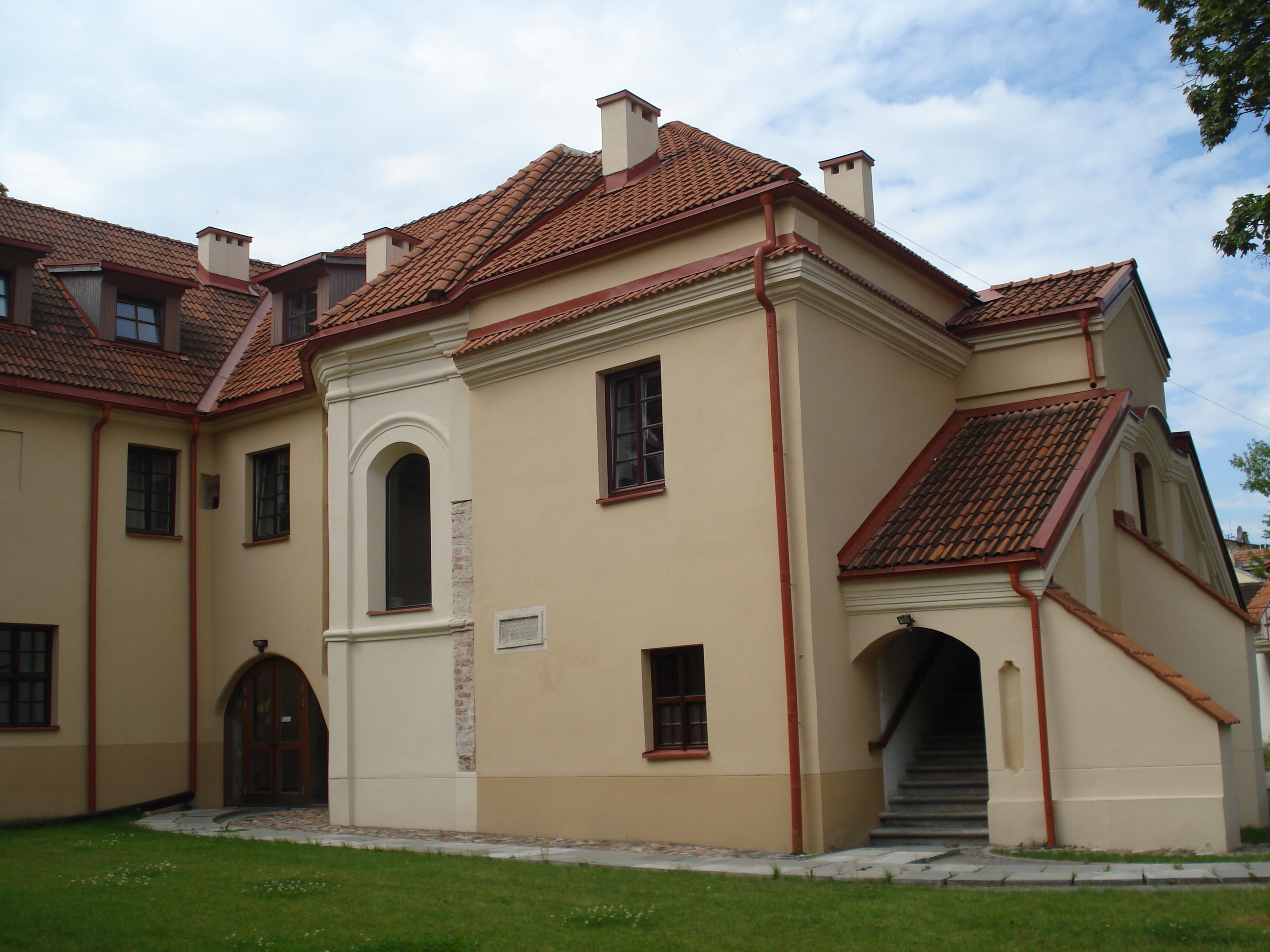
Buildings of the monastery complex in 2007

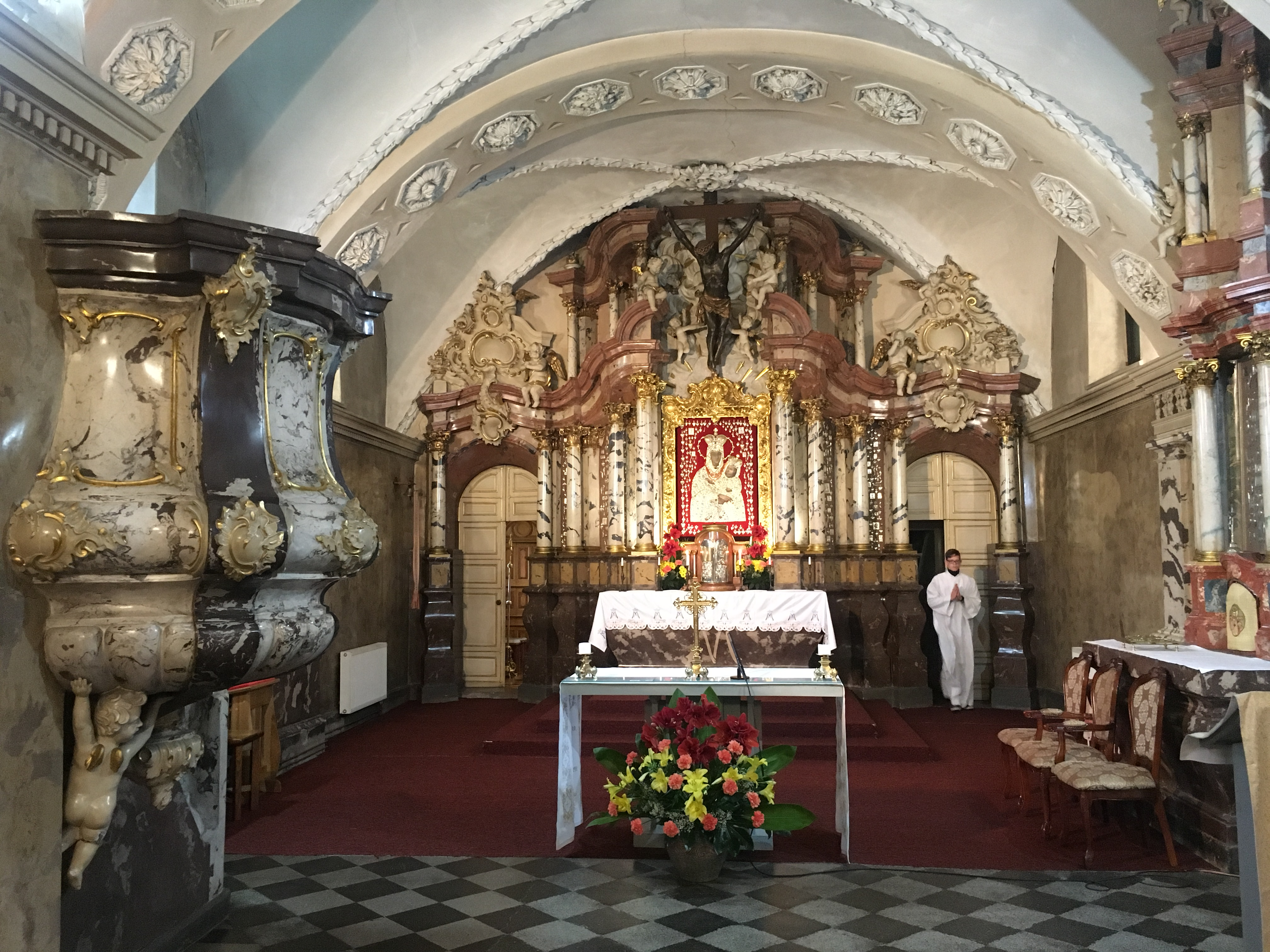
Interior of the church in 2017
