= Bychowiec Chronicle =

16th-century Lithuanian chronicle

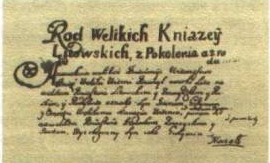
A page from the chronicle

The Bychowiec Chronicle (also spelled Bykhovets, Bykovets or Bychovec) is an anonymous 16th-century chronicle of the Grand Duchy of Lithuania. Although one of the least reliable sources of the epoch, it is considered the most extensive redaction of the Lithuanian Chronicles. It is named after its discoverer.

== Origin and publication ==
The chronicle was most probably authored between 1519 and 1542, though some parts continued to be added until 1574. Authors of the chronicle are not known. The text highlights achievements of the Goštautai and Olshanski families, particularly to Jonas Goštautas. Therefore, scholars concluded that it was sponsored by a member of these families. Scholars proposed Grand Chancellor Albertas Goštautas, Bishop Paweł Holszański, and Duke Olelkovich.

The chronicle in named after Aleksander Bychowiec, a 19th-century Polish noble, in whose library the chronicle was discovered in 1830 by Hipolit Klimaszewski, a teacher from Vilnius, who reported the find and published an excerpt with translation in Polish in the calendar Noworocznik Litewski na r. 1831 in 1830. Teodor Narbutt studied, copied and published it in full in 1846 under the title Pomniki do dziejów litewskich. The original 159-page manuscript went missing soon after Narbutt's death, and until 2011 the chronicle was known only from Narbutt's copy. Because of that, earlier researchers were skeptical of the chronicle's authenticity. The chronicle was also published in 1907 in the volume 17 of the Complete Collection of Russian Chronicles. A Lithuanian translation was published in 1971.

In 2011, Lithuanian historians discovered a fragment (about one-fifth of the original) of a chronicle that is essentially identical to the Bychowiec Chronicle at the National Archives in Kraków and published it in 2018.

== Content ==
Narbutt claimed that the reverse of the last page said that it is a Lithuanian chronicle translated from the Ruthenian language into Polish. In fact, it is in Ruthenian transcribed in the Polish alphabet. The chronicle is missing a beginning and an end. The first page was reconstructed by editors of the Complete Collection of Russian Chronicles using the writings of Maciej Stryjkowski. The chronicle ends in the middle of a sentence describing the 1506 Battle of Kletsk. In addition to being positively biased towards Lithuanian nobility, particularly the Goštautai family, the chronicle also pays closer attention to Catholic affairs, particularly the Franciscans. The legend of the Franciscan martyrs of Vilnius was first recorded in the chronicle.

The content can be broadly divided into three parts: legendary, historical, and contemporary. The legendary section elaborated on the Palemonids legends, tracing genealogy of Lithuanian nobility back to Apolon or Palemon, a 5th-century noble from the Roman Empire. The historical section describes historical events using other chronicles as a source. This section is often confused and contradictory. It rarely dates events and mixes them according to the theme; the reconstruction of proper chronology would be impossible without other sources. This section is not considered reliable. The contemporary section describes events during the chronicler's life, particularly the reign of Alexander Jagiellon (1492–1506). This section is considered valuable and reliable.

The Bychowiec chronicle used many medieval documents as its sources, primarily earlier versions of Lithuanian Chronicles, which in turn used other chronicles, including the Galician–Volhynian Chronicle. After about 1446, the chronicle became an independent source, using notes made during the reign of Alexander Jagiellon. The chroniclers probably had access to notes or chronicles of Jonas Goštautas as his activities in 1440–53 are particularly detailed.

Although one of the least reliable Slavonic-language chronicles, the Bychowiec chronicle is generally believed to have used many medieval documents as its sources. George Perfecky used a comparative text analysis in an attempt to prove that an important source of the Bychowiec manuscript was, in fact, the Galician-Volhynian Chronicle, only, possibly in a copy or in excerpts that differed slightly from the versions which we know now.
