= Antoni Wiwulski =

Polish and Lithuanian architect and sculptor

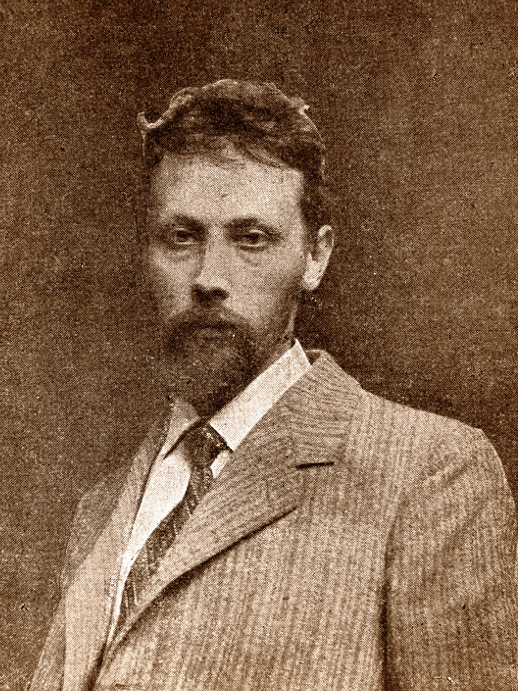
- Antoni Wiwulski ca. 1910
- Born: 20 February 1877; Totma, Totemsky Uyezd, Vologda Governorate, Russian Empire
- Died: 10 January 1919 (aged 41); Soviet-occupied Vilnius
- Known for: Sculpture
- Notable work: The Grunwald Monument in Kraków, 1910; Three Crosses in Vilnius, 1916

Antoni Wiwulski (Lithuanian: Antanas Vivulskis; 20 February 1877 – 10 January 1919) was a Polish-Lithuanian architect and sculptor.

== Biography ==
He was born 20 February 1877 in Totma, in Russia, where his father Antoni, veteran of the January Uprising of 1863, served as a forest superintendent. Both parent were born in Samogitia, his mother Adelajda Karpuszko was able to speak in Samogitian. Antoni Wiwulski graduated from the German gymnasium in Mitau, and later from the reputable Jesuit boarding school in Khyriv. There he met Jan Beyzym, who developed in him a passion for carving. He graduated in 1897 and then two of the most prestigious art and architecture universities of the epoch: the École Supérieure des Beaux-Arts in Paris and the Higher Technical School in Vienna. In Paris he met Władysław Mickiewicz and, through this acquaintance, Ignacy Paderewski. In July 1908 he stayed at Paderewski's residence in Morges, Switzerland, where the idea of creating a monument commemorating the 500th anniversary of the Battle of Grunwald was born. His work was part of the sculpture event in the art competition at the 1912 Summer Olympics.

Among the most notable of his works are:

- the Grunwald Monument in Kraków, Poland (1910)
- Chapel in Šiluva, Lithuania (1912–1924)
- the Holy Heart of Jesus' Church in Vilnius, Lithuania (started in 1913, unfinished)
- Three Crosses on the Hill of the Three Crosses Vilnius, Lithuania (1916)

The Holy Heart of Jesus' Church was started in 1913 and was the first monumental building created with usage of reinforced concrete in the former Polish–Lithuanian Commonwealth. Wiwulski, impressed by the possibility of building gigantic buildings with the newly rediscovered material prepared a project of a giant church with a stylised gigantic sculpture of the Creator sitting on the dome. However, the project was discontinued after Wiwulski's death on 10 January 1919.

In 1919, despite suffering from tuberculosis, he volunteered for the Polish militia (Self-Defence of Lithuania and Belarus) and took part in the defence of Vilnius against Bolshevik assault in the early stages of the Polish-Bolshevik War campaigns. He contracted pneumonia while on guard in the Vilnius' suburb of Užupis. After his death he was buried in the cellars beneath the church he had designed. When it was converted by the Soviets into a Palace of the Construction Workers in 1964, his ashes were moved to Rasos Cemetery.

== Gallery ==
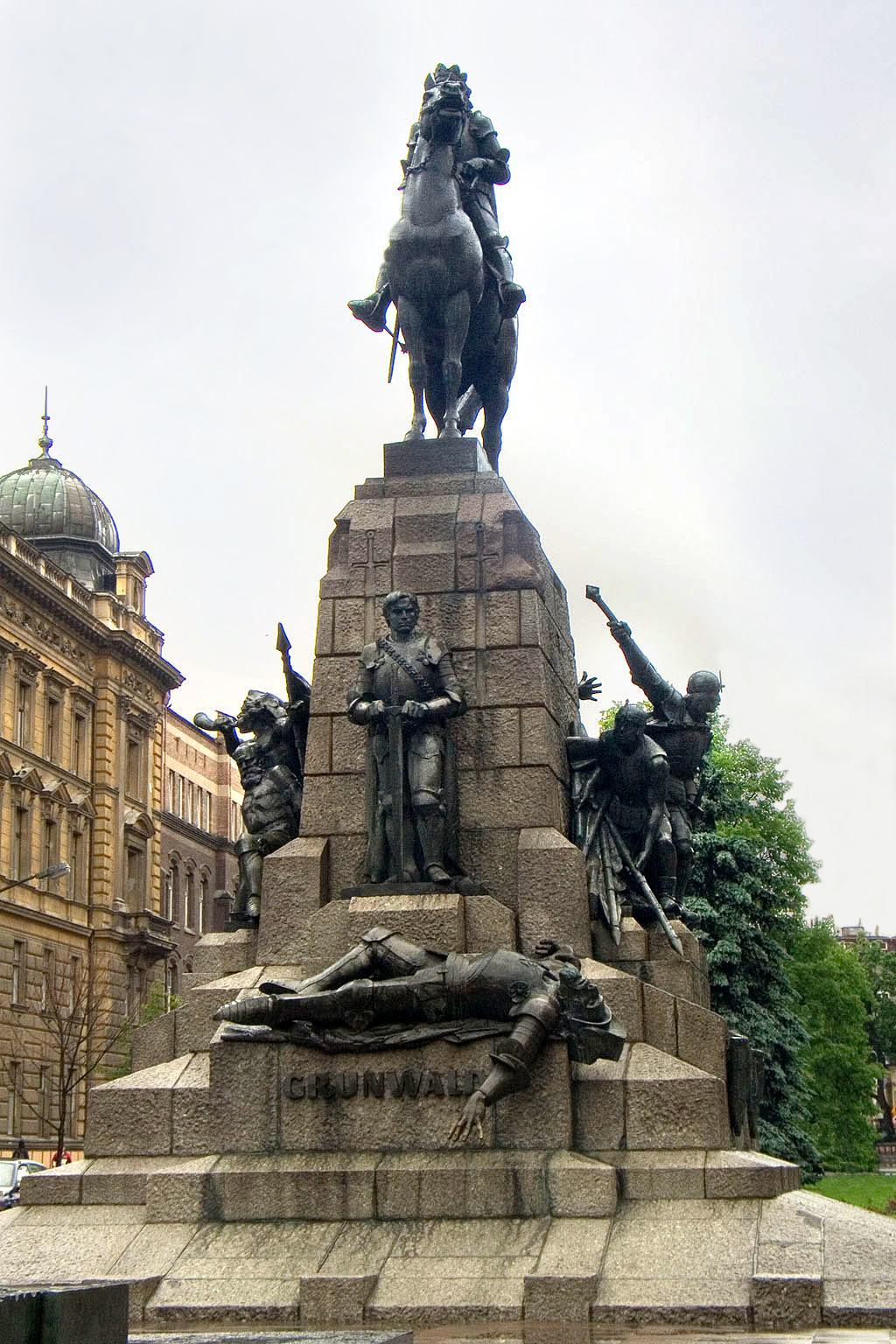
The Grunwald Monument commemorating the 500th anniversary of the Battle of Grunwald in Kraków, Poland

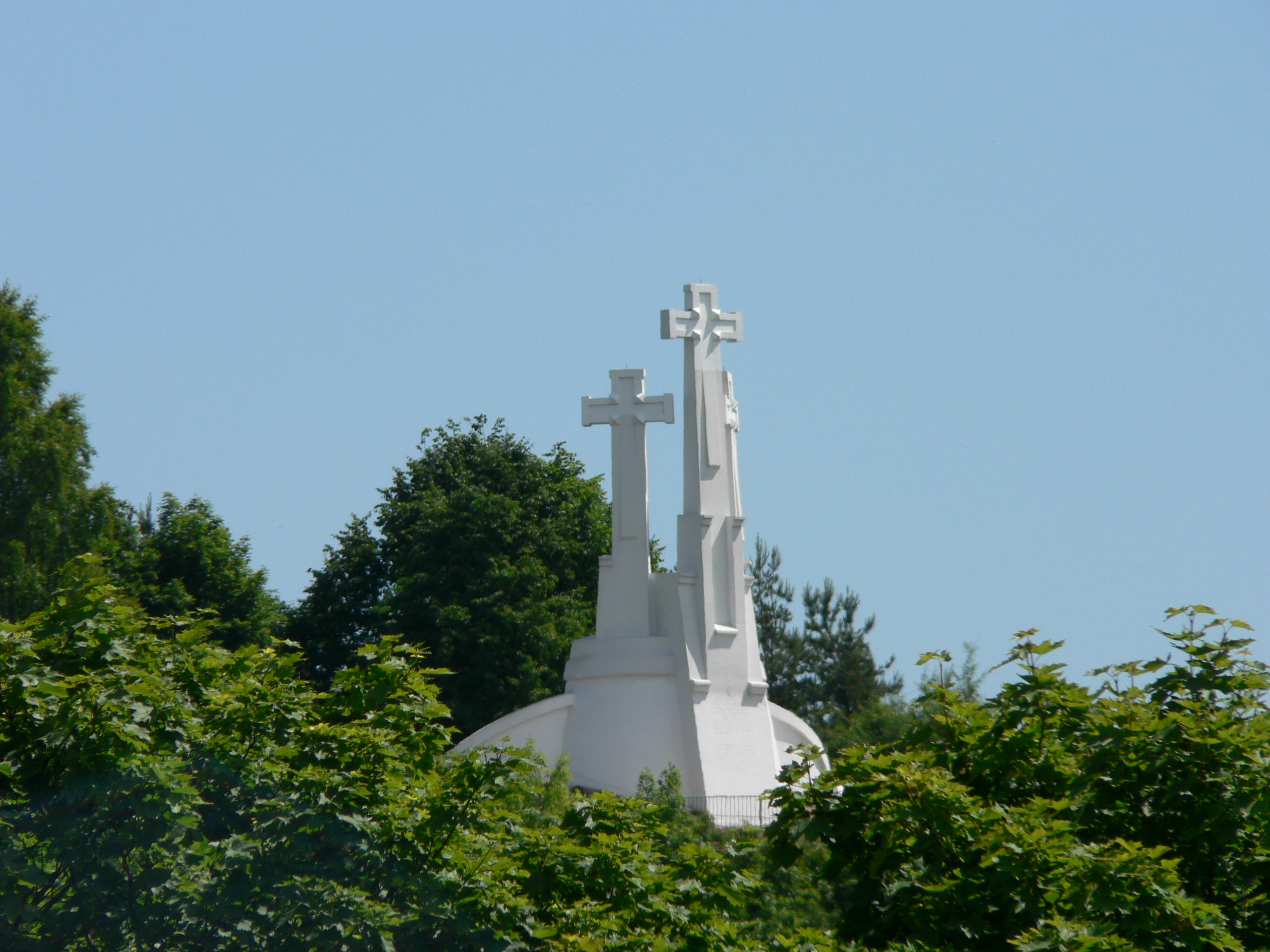
Three Crosses on the hill of the same name in Vilnius, Lithuania

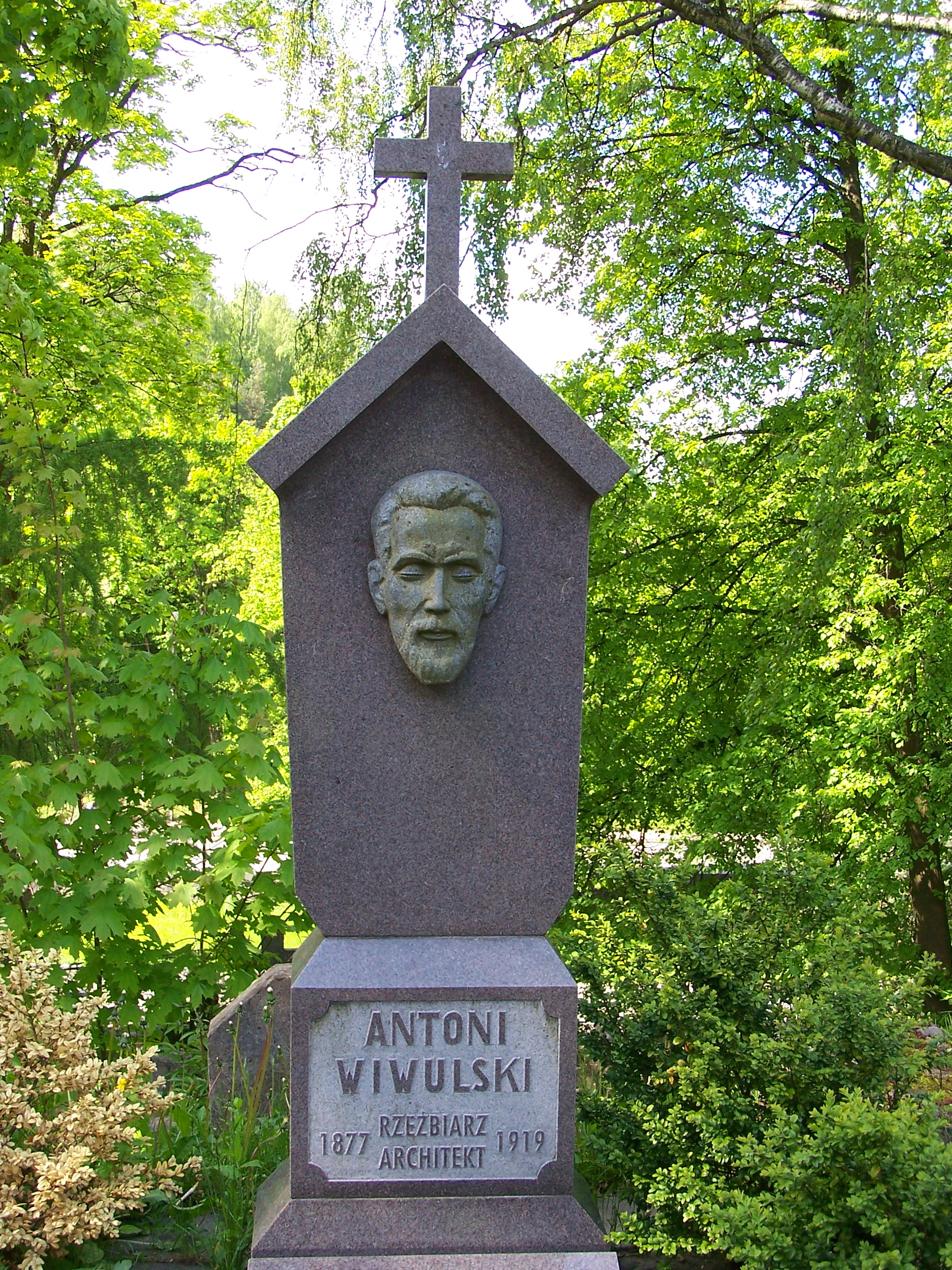
Tomb of Antoni Wiwulski in Rasos Cemetery

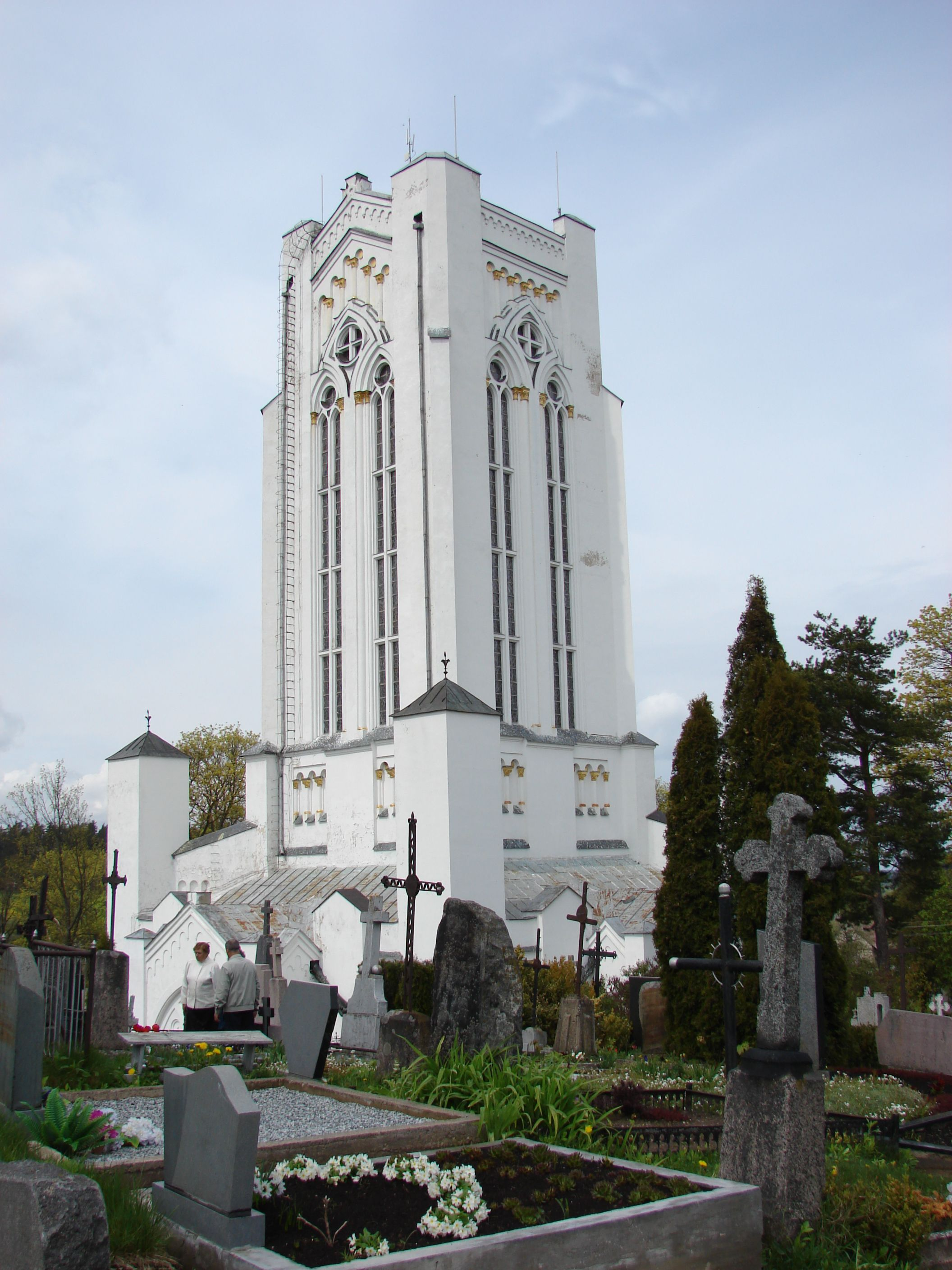
Siluva Chapel

== See also ==
- List of Polish sculptors
- List of Poles

== Bibliography ==
- Nijolė Lukšionytė-Tolvaišienė (2002). Antanas Vivulskis: Tradicijų ir modernumo dermė [Antanas Vivulskis (1877-1919): Synthesis of Traditions and Modernity] (in Lithuanian). Vilniaus dailės akademijos leidykla (Vilnius Academy of Arts Press). ISBN 9986571790.
- Stefański, Krzysztof (1994). "Antoni Wiwulski jako architekt". Biuletyn Historii Sztuki. 56 (1–2).
