= Kalnai Park =

Park in Vilniius, Lithuania

Coordinates: 54°41′13″N 25°18′4″E

Kalnų Park
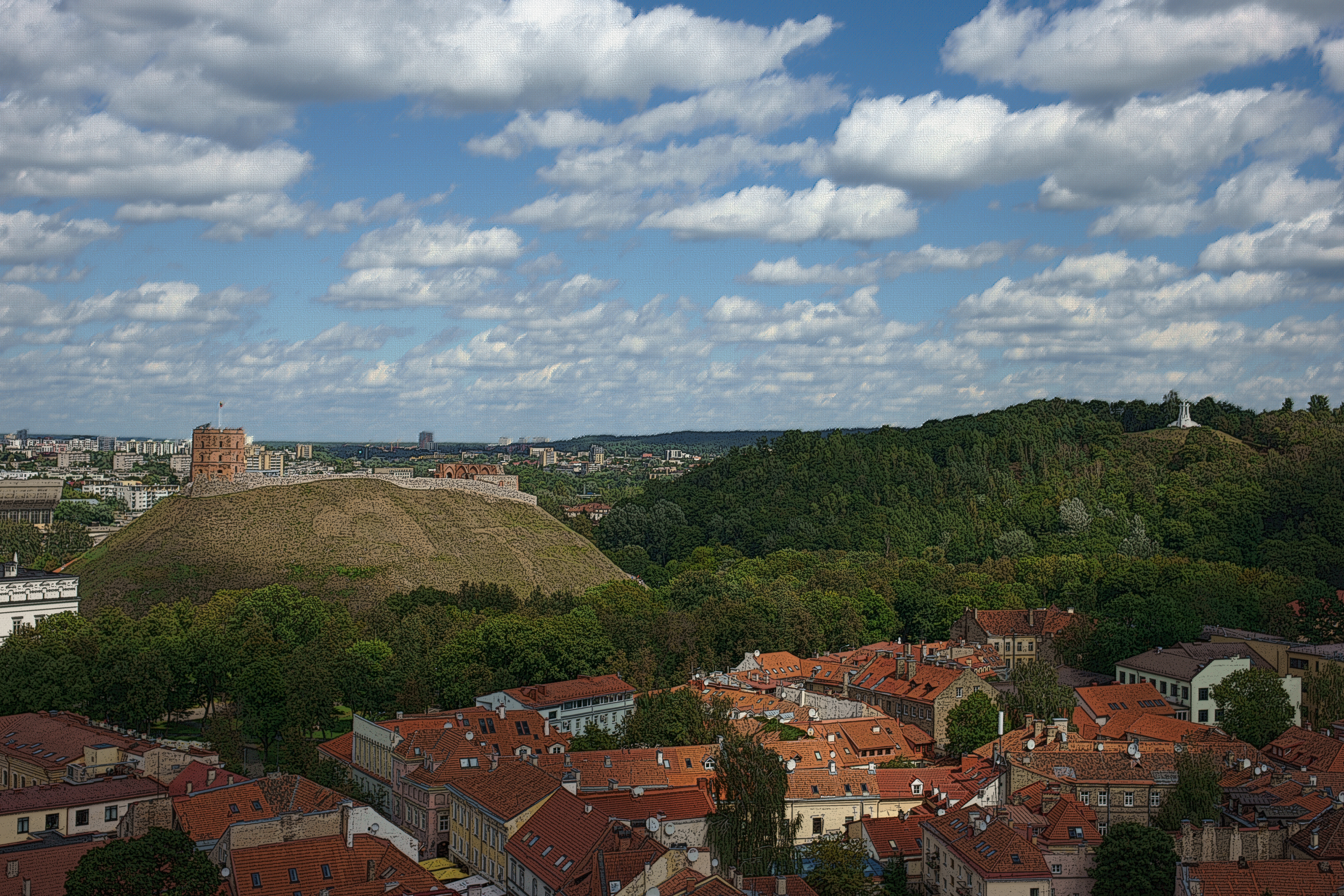
- View of Gediminas Hill and Kalnai Park

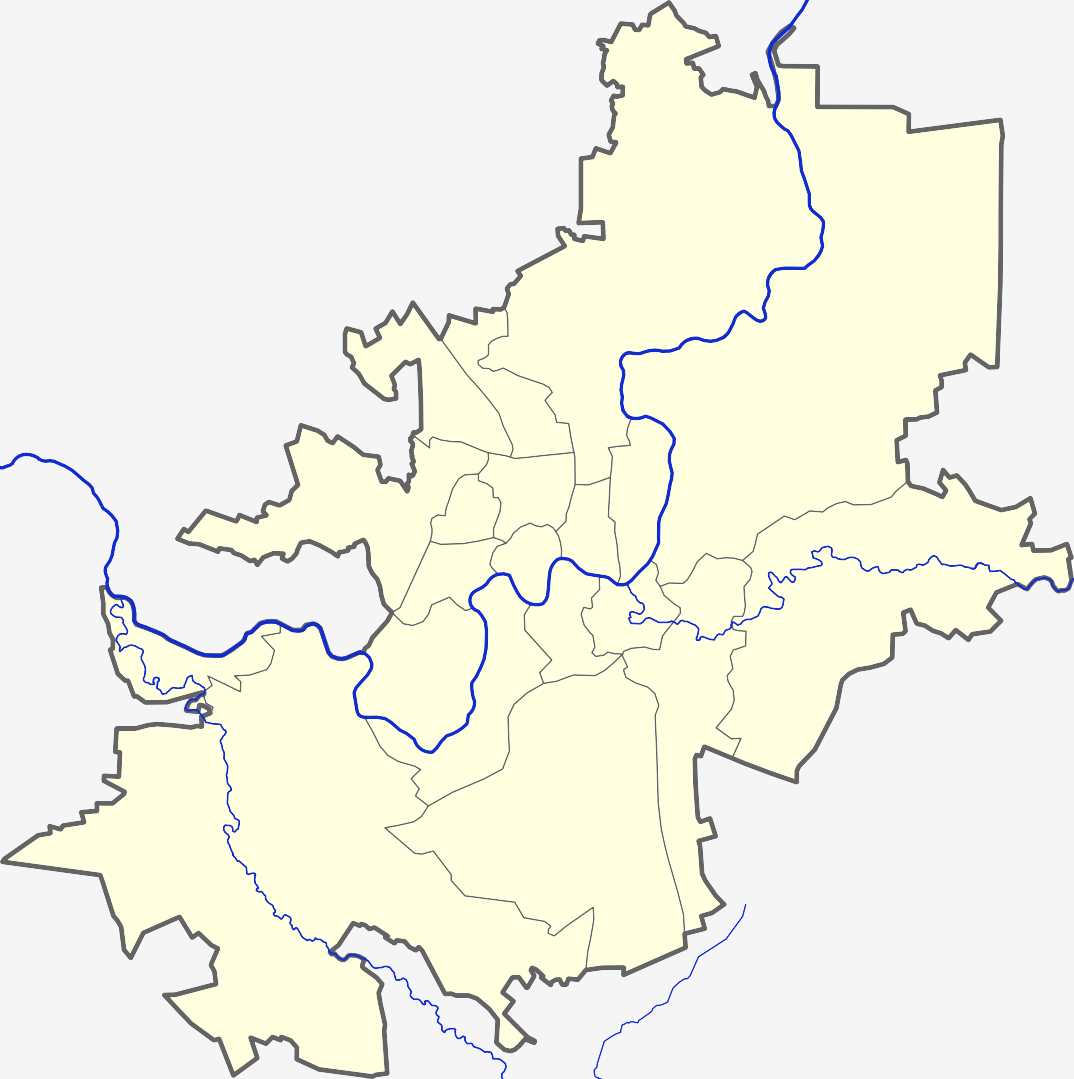
- Location within Vilnius
- Type: Public park
- Location: Vilnius, Lithuania
- Area: 61 acres (25 ha)
- Operator: Directorate of the State Cultural Reserve of Vilnius Castles
- Status: Open year round

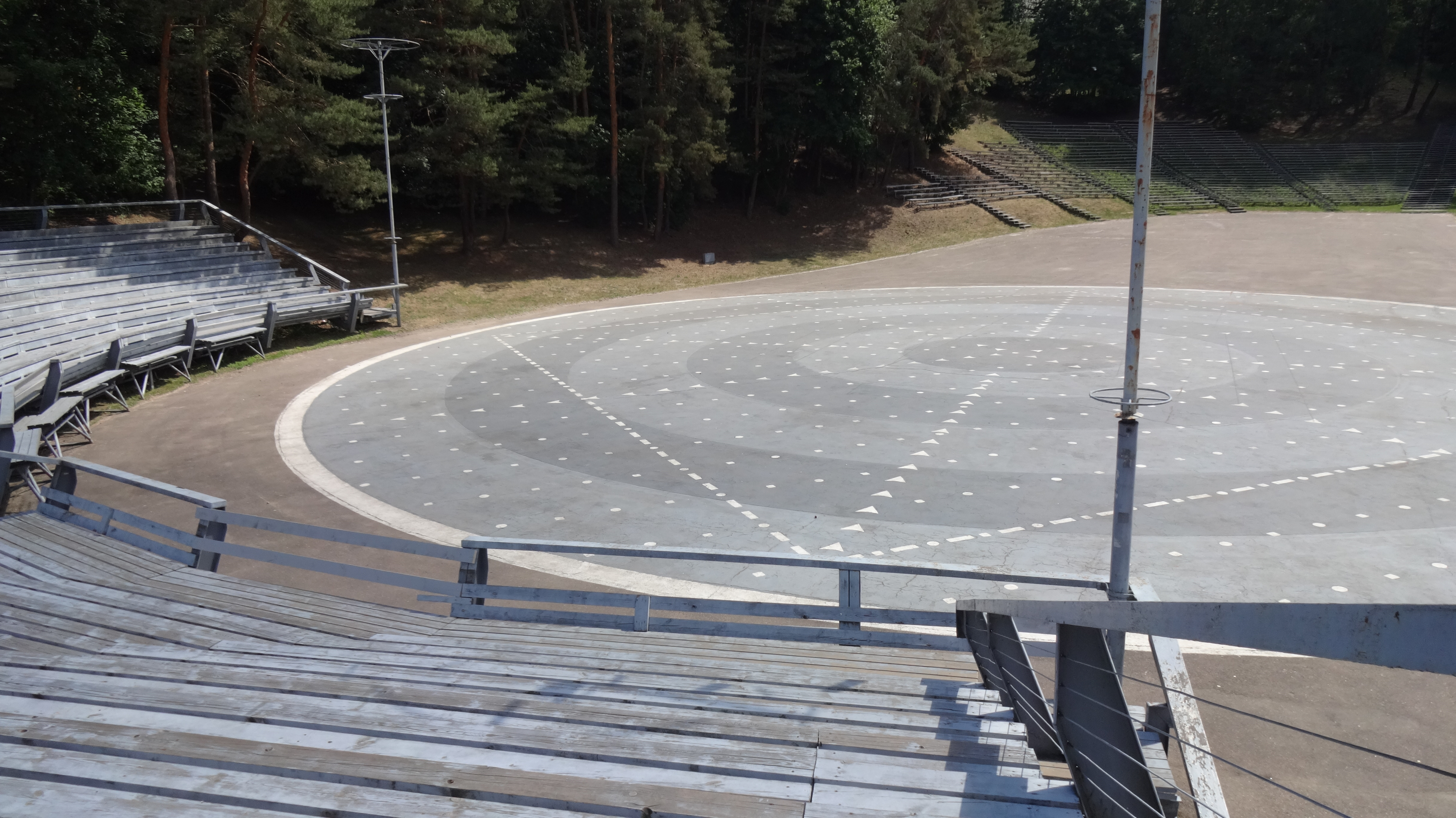
Stage in Kalnų Park

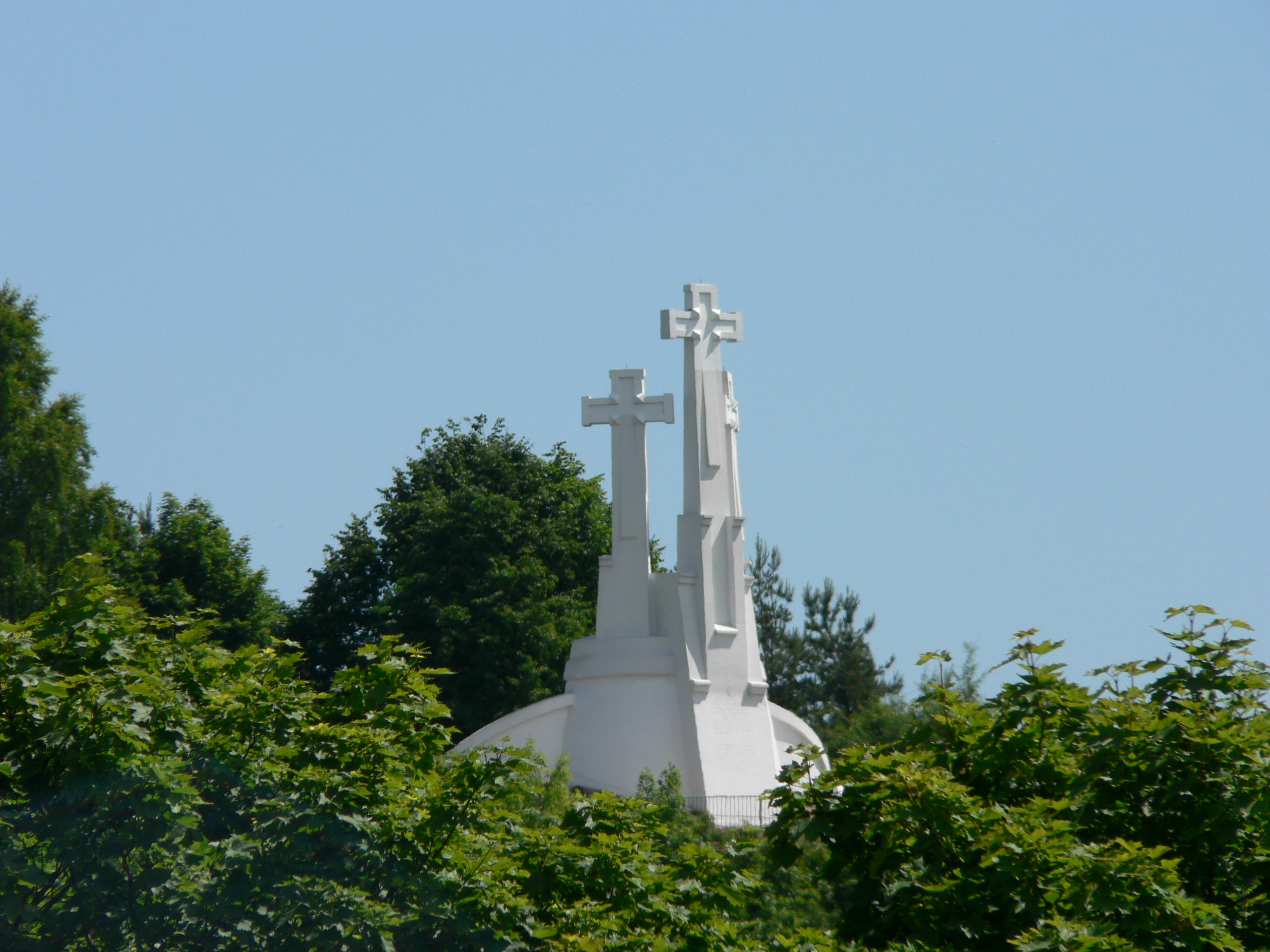
Three Crosses on the Crooked Hill

Kalnai Park (Lithuanian: Kalnų parkas, literally: Park of Hills) is a 24.5-hectare (61-acre) park between the left bank of the Neris River and right bank of the Vilnia River in Vilnius, Lithuania. It lies within the Vilnius Old Town elderate near Gediminas Hill and Gediminas Tower, and is part of the State Cultural Reserve of Vilnius Castles, established in 1997. The park hosts various events, including concerts, political rallies, and sporting competitions. Its name reflects the presence of four prominent hills (kalnai): Crooked Hill, Table Hill, Bekes Hill, and the Hill of Gediminas's Grave.

== History ==
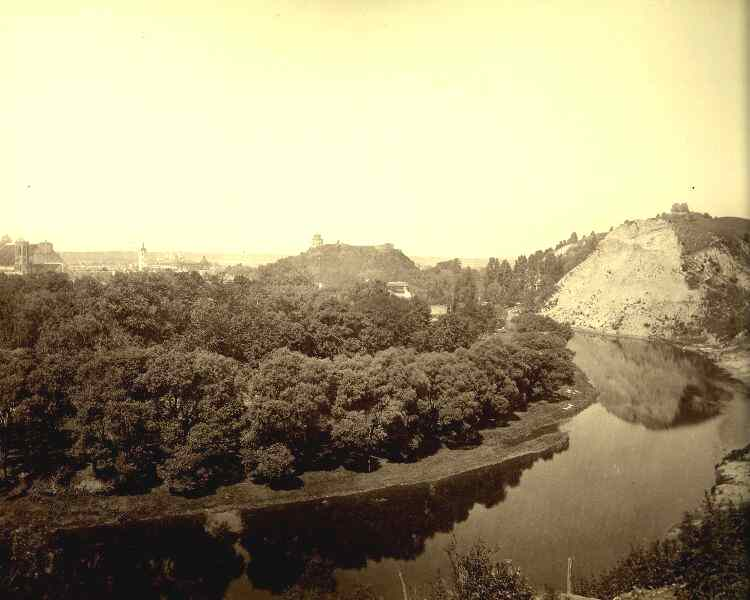
Remains of Bekes Hill (on the right) before it was washed away entirely

Archeologists have hypothesized that the 162-metre (531 ft) Crooked Hill (also known as Bleak Hill and Three Crosses Hill) housed the wooden Crooked Castle, which was destroyed during the Lithuanian Civil War (1389–1392) and never rebuilt. This hill fort was damaged by erosion and by construction of fortifications during the 17th and 18th centuries. According to a legend, seven Franciscan friars attempting to convert Lithuania to Christianity were murdered there during the reign of Duke Algirdas. In some versions of the legend, three of the monks were crucified. Wooden memorial crosses and a chapel were erected at the site; the concrete Three Crosses were built in 1916. The crosses were torn down in 1950 by order of the Soviet government and replaced by the current monument in 1989.

Table Hill is not well researched; in 1955 its top was bulldozed to make it perfectly flat. Bekes Hill was destroyed by erosion and was washed away by the Vilnia in 1838 and 1843. It was named after Gáspár Bekes from Hungary (1520–1579), a military commander under Stephen Báthory of Poland, who was buried on the hill (he was of Arianism faith and therefore refused admittance to other city's cemeteries). His grave was marked by an octagonal tower, 20 metres (66 ft) in height and 6 metres (20 ft) in diameter. Lithuanians plan to cooperate with the Embassy of Hungary to restore his memory in the park. The Hill of Gediminas' Grave is used by the reconstructionist-pagan Romuva church as a ritual site. According to legend, Gediminas, Grand Duke of Lithuania, was buried on the hill.

While the territory may hold the key to the earliest history of Vilnius, no comprehensive archaeological research has been undertaken. Several small and isolated studies were conducted during various construction works in the park. In summer 2008, archeological excavations began in the so-called Valley of Songs, where a small settlement existed in the 13th and 14th centuries and where the Soviets built a stage for concerts in 1955–1956. The scientists uncovered the bodies of several German World War II prisoners.
