= Chronicle of the Twenty-Four Generals of the Order of Friars Minor =

Medieval chronicle

The Chronicle of the Twenty-Four Generals of the Order of Friars Minor (Latin: Chronica XXIV Generalium Ordinis Fratrum Minorum) is a medieval chronicle written in Latin around 1370, possibly by the Franciscan friar Arnaud de Sarrant, though Ralf Lützelschwab doubts this attribution. The work deals with the history of Franciscan Order from its foundation by Saint Francis of Assisi to Leonardo Rossi (1373–1378), the 24th Minister General if counting Francis as the first. The chronicle contains detailed accounts of various miracles and martyrs. For example, the Chronicle describes the deaths of Berard and his companions, the first Franciscan martyrs, killed in Morocco in 1221. Overall, the Chronicle was heavily used by later Franciscan historians.

It is the earliest extant source for the incarceration of Roger Bacon.
