= Manvydas family =

Lithuanian noble family

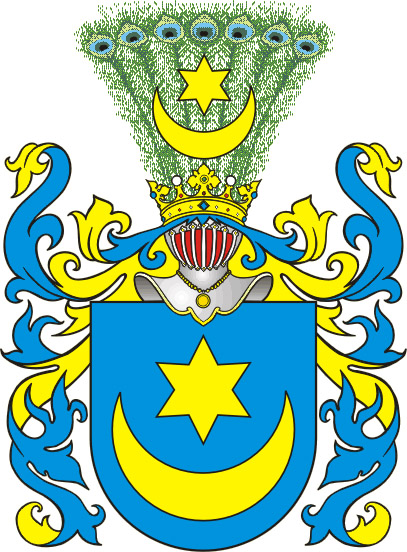
Leliwa coat of arms, used by the Manvydai family

The Manvydai family (Polish: Moniwid) was a small but influential 15th-century Lithuanian noble family, whose most prominent members were brothers Albertas Manvydas and Jurgis Gedgaudas and their sons Jonas Manvydas and Petras Gedgaudas. The family used the Leliwa coat of arms that were received in the Union of Horodło (1413). They considered Vishnyeva and Zhuprany in present-day Belarus their ancestral estates. In a few decades, the family amassed about 20 larger land holdings with about 2,500 serf households. The family supported Grand Duke Švitrigaila who was deposed in 1432. The last male heir died in 1475 and the family's wealth was inherited by the Radziwiłł family and Alekna Sudimantaitis.

== History ==
Founder of the family, Albertas Manvydas, was first mentioned in a document dated 1387–1389. The same document recorded his patronymic name as Коиликиновичъ which allows to deconstruct his father's name as Gailiginas (Kojlikin, Gojligin). According to historian Jan Długosz (1415–1480), Albertas was married to a sister of Anna, Grand Duchess of Lithuania, and thus was a brother-in-law of Grand Duke Vytautas. Lithuanian historian Inga Baranauskienė attributed Albertas' rise to prominence due to this relationship to Vytautas.

Albertas Manvydas became the first Voivode of Vilnius when the voivodeship was established in 1413. After his death, the post passed to his brother Jurgis Gedgaudas who lost it in 1432 when he continued to support the deposed Grand Duke Švitrigaila. However, he managed to regain royal favor and his only son Petras Gedgaudas even received Mir in 1434. Brothers Albertas Manvydas and Jurgis Gedgaudas were buried in Vilnius Cathedral in a chapel they had funded. Petras Gedgaudas married Milochna, daughter of Mykolas Kęsgaila, Elder of Samogitia, but the couple had no children.

Albertas Manvydas had only one known son, Jonas "Ivaschko" Manvydas, who was Voivode of Trakai in 1443–1458. He had four known children, two sons and two daughters. His daughters married prominent Lithuanian nobles – Mikalojus Radvila the Old, ancestor of the powerful Radziwiłł family, and Alekna Sudimantaitis, Grand Chancellor of Lithuania. His son Jonas probably died young. Albertas, the last male heir of the family, was castellan of Vilnius (1461) and starosta of Navahrudak (1473–1475). The title of Voivode of Vilnius was passed not to him, but to his brothers-in-law. In 1475, he participated in a knight tournament held during the wedding of Hedwig Jagiellon and George, Duke of Bavaria (see Landshut Wedding). He attended the event with a retinue of 50 people (including four Tatars) and unsuccessfully competed against Christoph the Strong, son of Albert III. He died on the way back from a plague. His only daughter Ona married Mykolas Kęsgaila, Grand Marshal of Lithuania. Kęsgaila was married twice and had children.

== Family tree ==
Gailiginas
Jurgis Gedgaudas; Voivode of Vilnius; Died in 1435 | Albertas Manvydas; Voivode of Vilnius; Died in 1423 | Jadviga or Juliana; Possibly sister-in-law of Grand Duke Vytautas
Petras Simonas Gedgaudas; Regent of Polotsk and Smolensk; Died in 1451 | Milochna; Daughter of Mykolas Kęsgaila | Jonas Manvydas; Voivode of Trakai; Died in 1458
Jonas Manvydas II; Died after 1460 | Albertas Manvydas II; Castellan of Vilnius; Died in 1475 | Sofija Ona Manvydaitė; Married Mikalojus Radvila the Old | Jadvyga Manvydaitė; Married Alekna Sudimantaitis
Ona Manvydaitė; Married Mykolas Kęsgaila | Radziwiłł family | Five daughters
