= Jonas Manvydas =

Lithuanian noble

Jonas "Ivaška" Manvydas (Polish: Jan (Iwaszko) Moniwidowicz; died 1458) was a Lithuanian noble. A member of the Manvydas family, he was Voivode of Trakai from 1443 to 1458.

== Biography ==
Manvydas was first recorded in written sources in May 1423 when he affixed his seal to the Treaty of Melno. In August 1431, he witnessed the truce of Chortoryisk that Grand Duke Švitrigaila concluded with the Teutonic Order (see Polish–Teutonic War (1431–1435)). At the time, he was a starosta of Kremenets. Manvydas and his family continued to support Švitrigaila after he was deposed in August 1432. His uncle Jurgis Gedgaudas was captured in the Battle of Ashmyany and reconciled with the new Grand Duke Sigismund Kęstutaitis. Manvydas continued to support Švitrigaila in the Lithuanian Civil War (1432–1438). In 1436–1437, he claimed the title of Voivode of Podolia.

In 1440, after the assassination of Sigismund Kęstutaitis, he supported Casimir Jagiellon against Michael Žygimantaitis and regained his influence in the Grand Duchy of Lithuania. In 1441, he participated in border negotiations with the Livonian Order. In 1443, he became Voivode of Trakai. After the death of Jonas Goštautas in 1458, he also briefly was Voivode of Vilnius.

== Family ==
Manvydas was the only known son of Albertas Manvydas. His mother possibly was a sister of Grand Duchess Anna, wife of Grand Duke Vytautas. Manvydas' wife was Anna, but her origins are not known. They had four known children, two sons and two daughters. His daughters married prominent Lithuanian nobles – Sifija married Mikalojus Radvila the Old, ancestor of the powerful Radziwiłł family, and Jadviga married Alekna Sudimantaitis, Grand Chancellor of Lithuania. His son Jonas probably died young. Albertas, the last male heir of the family, was castellan of Vilnius (1461) and starosta of Navahrudak (1473–1475).

He considered Zhuprany in present-day Belarus as his main patronymic estate. He inherited Vishnyeva from his cousin Petras Gedgaudas. Manvydas founded a chapel near the Vilnia River in Vilnius.
