= Albertas Manvydas =

Lithuanian noble (died 1423)

Leliwa coat of arms which Albertas Manvydas received in 1413

Albertas Manvydas or Albertas Vaitiekus Manvydas (Polish: Wojciech Moniwid), died in 1423 was a Lithuanian noble, the first Voivode of Vilnius and founder of the Manvydai family. During the turbulent disputes over Samogitia, he was sent as a negotiation to the Teutonic Knights. Along with Stanislovas Čiupurna, Manvydas was the most influential noble during the early reign of Grand Duke Vytautas.

== Biography ==
Manvydas was first mentioned in a document dated 1387–89 when he, along other nobles, vouched for Hryćko Konstantynowicz who organized a rebellion against Skirgaila, regent of the Grand Duchy of Lithuania in the name of his brother Jogaila. He was a starosta of Vilnius from 1396 to 1413. After an administrative reform that established Vilnius Voivodeship in 1413, Manvydas became the first Voivode of Vilnius and held that position until his death. During the First Samogitian uprising, he was sent on diplomatic missions to the Teutonic Knights and helped negotiate the Peace of Raciąż (1404). In 1403, komtur of Balga gifted him spurs, a symbol of knighthood. Very likely, he commanded a Lithuanian unit in the Battle of Grunwald. He participated in the 1413 Union of Horodło and received Leliwa coat of arms though he had used a personal coat of arms as early as the 1398 treaty of Salynas. Manvydas was among Lithuanian diplomats negotiating with Benedict Makrai, mediator of the Lithuanian–Teutonic dispute over Samogitia.

== Property ==
Die Littauischen Wegeberichte mentioned Manewidendorf near Hieraniony (now in Belarus). Other patronymic territories included Vishnyeva, Zhuprany, and possibly Braslaw. He also had possessions in Vilnius. He funded the Chapel of St. Albert and St. George (his and his brother's Christian names) within Vilnius Cathedral, which is possibly the present-day Chapel of Ignatius of Loyola, and was buried there. He also funded a Catholic church in Braslaw. His donation to a Franciscan monastery in Ashmyany in 1407 is the first known surviving personal document of a Lithuanian noble; the surviving copy is a forgery, but likely was based on a similar document.

== Family ==
The document from 1387–89 recorded his patronymic name as Коиликиновичъ which allows to deconstruct his father's name as Gailiginas (Kojlikin, Gojligin). Manvydas was his pagan Lithuanian name. When Lithuania converted to Christianity, he was given Albertas (Albert) as his baptismal name. Since Wojciech is interchangeable with Albert in the Polish language, he is also known as Wojciech (Lithuanian: Vaitiekus). Manvydas was a brother of Jurgis Gedgaudas, starosta of Podolia, who became Voivode of Vilnius after Manvydas' death.

Manvydas was married twice: Jadvyga and Juliania. Jadviga's origin is unknown. Polish historians Władysław Semkowicz and Marceli Antoniewicz have attempted to identify her with Jadwiga of Leżenic who adopted Manvydas in the 1413 Union of Horodło. Information on Juliana is conflicting. Origo regis Jagyelo et Witholdi ducum Lithuaniae mentions that Juliana, who later married Manvydas, was wife of Butrimas, the murdered nephew of Birutė and cousin of Vytautas. Jan Długosz mentions that Juliana was a widow of Narimantas, who died in defense of Vilnius in 1390, and a sister of Anna, wife of Vytautas. Lithuanian historian Inga Baranauskienė suggested that Manvydas rose to prominence in the service of Vytautas due to them being in-laws and that Jadviga (mentioned once in a 1407 document) was just a baptismal name of Juliana.

Manvydas had one known son Jonas Manvydas who died in 1458.

== Bibliography ==
- Baranauskienė, Inga (February 2012). "Onos Vytautienės kilmė ir giminė". Kultūros barai (in Lithuanian). 2. ISSN 0134-3106.
- Petrauskas, Rimvydas (2003). Lietuvos diduomenė XIV a. pabaigoje – XV a. (in Lithuanian). Aidai. ISBN 9955-445-67-X.
- Petrauskas, Rimvydas (2016). Galia ir tradicija. Lietuvos Didžiosios Kunigaikštystės giminių istorijos (in Lithuanian). Baltos lankos. ISBN 978-9955-23-886-7.
- Prochaska, Antoni (1908). "Rokosz Hryćka Konstantynowicza 1387–1390". Kwartalnik Historyczny (in Polish). 22. ISSN 0023-5903.
