= Mikołaj III Radziwiłł =

Lithuanian noble (c. 1492–1530)

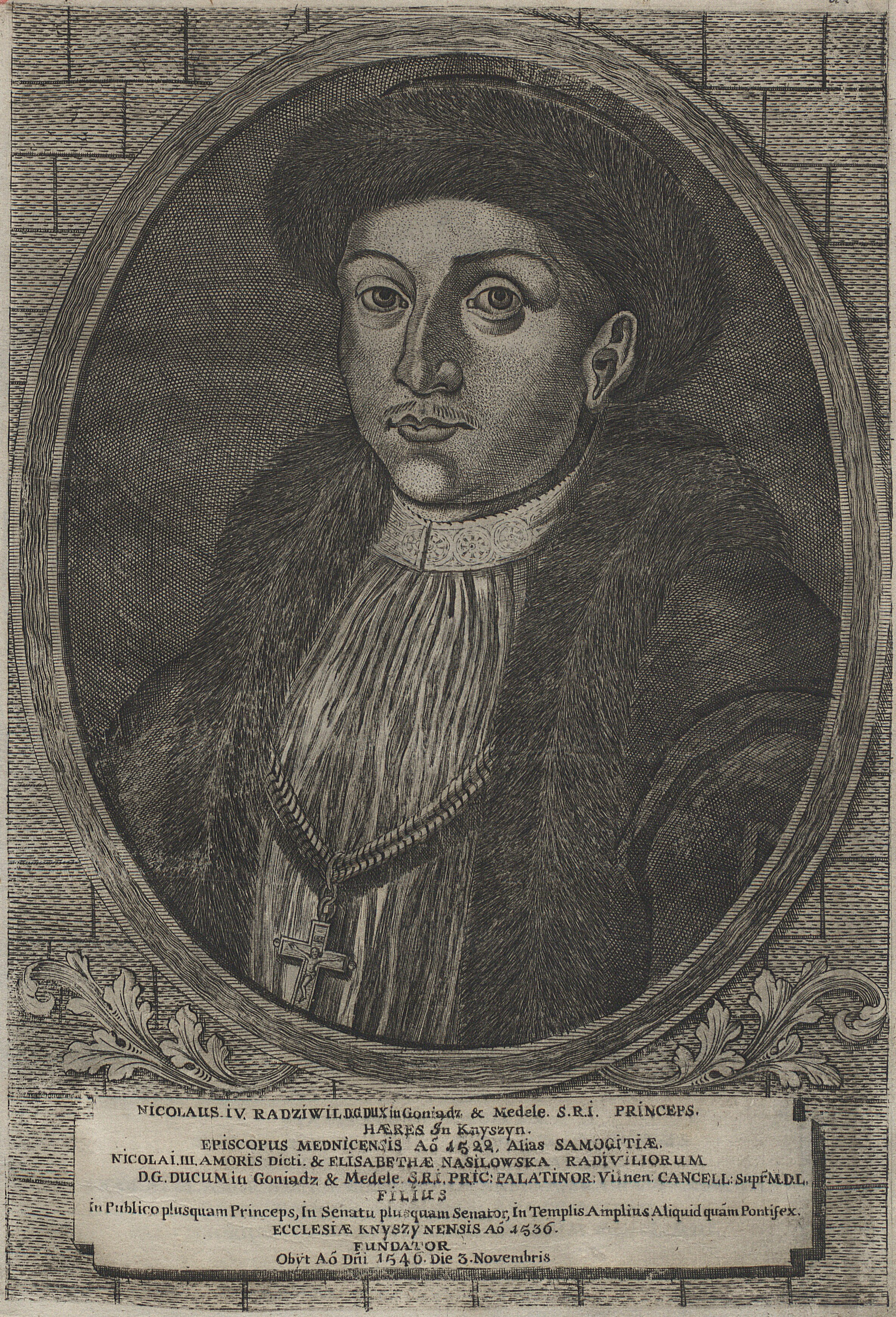
- Born: c. 1492
- Died: 3 November 1529/30; Varniai, Lithuania
- Parent(s): Mikolaj Radziwiłł; Elźbieta Sakowicz

Mikolaj Radziwiłł (Lithuanian: Mikalojus Radvila III; c. 1492 – 1530) was the Bishop of Samogitia of Radziwill Family. He was son of Mikolaj Radziwiłł, Grand Chancellor of Lithuania.

Ancestors of Mikołaj III Radziwiłł

8. Radvila Astikas
4. Mikalojus Radvila the Old
9. NN
2. Mikołaj Radziwiłł II
10. NN
5. Sofija Ona Manvydaitė
11. NN
1. Mikołaj III Radziwiłł
12. NN
6. NN
13. NN
3. Elźbieta Sakowicz
14. NN
7. NN
15. NN

Catholic Church titles
Preceded by Marcin (Martynas Lintfaras)	Bishop of Samogitia; 1515–1530	Succeeded by Mikołaj (Mikalojus Viežgaila)
