= Polonisation =

Adoption or imposition of Polish culture

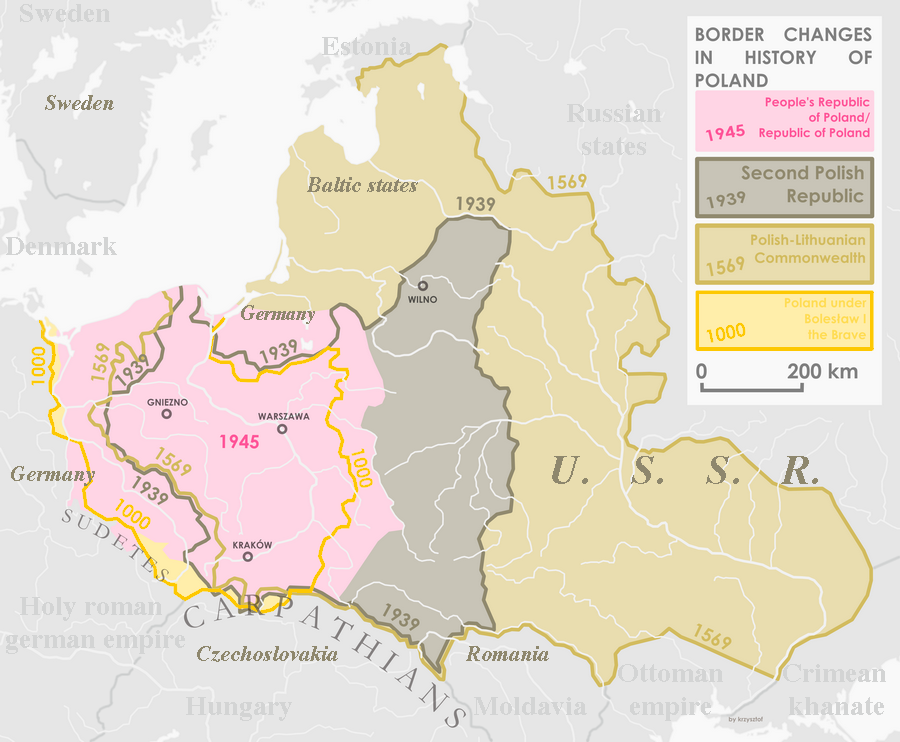
- Poland's and the Commonwealth's historical borders
- Duration: 1569–1945
- Location: Poland throughout history
- Borders: Yellow – 1000 Khaki – 1569 Silver – 1939 Pink – 1945

Polonisation or Polonization (Polish: polonizacja; Belarusian: паланізацыя, romanised: pałanizacyja; Ukrainian: полонізація, romanised: polonizatsiya; Lithuanian: polonizacija; Samogitian: puoluonėzacėjė) is the acquisition or imposition of elements of Polish culture, in particular the Polish language. This happened in some historic periods among non-Polish populations in territories controlled by or substantially under the influence of Poland.

Like other examples of cultural assimilation, Polonization could be either voluntary or forced. It was most visible in territories where the Polish language or culture was dominant or where their adoption could result in increased prestige or social status, as was the case with the nobilities of Ruthenia and Lithuania. To a certain extent, political authorities have administratively promoted Polonization, particularly during the interwar period and in the period following World War II.

This happened to the population of the Grand Duchy of Lithuania in the times of the Polish–Lithuanian Commonwealth (1569–1795), when the Ruthenian and Lithuanian upper classes were drawn towards Westernisation with the adoption of Polish culture and the political and financial benefits of such a transition, as well as, sometimes, with the administrative pressure exerted on their own cultural institutions, primarily the Orthodox Church and Protestant by conversion to the Roman Catholic faith was often the single most important part of the process. For Ruthenians at that time, being Polish culturally and Roman Catholic by religion was almost the same. This diminishing of the Orthodox Church was the part most resented by the Belarusian and Ukrainian masses. In contrast, the Lithuanians, who were mostly Catholic, were in danger of losing their cultural identity as a nation, but that was not realised by the wide masses of Lithuanians until the Lithuanian national renaissance in the middle of the 19th century.

On the other hand, the Polonization policies of the Polish government during the interwar years of the 20th century, particularly in the Eastern Borderlands, were more deliberate. Some of them were similar to the mostly forcible assimilationist policies implemented by other European powers that have aspired to regional dominance (e.g., Germanisation, Italianization, Russification), while others resembled policies carried out by countries aiming at increasing the role of their native language and culture in their own societies (e.g., Magyarization, Romanianization, Ukrainization). For Poles, it was a process of rebuilding Polish national identity and reclaiming Polish heritage, including the fields of education, religion, infrastructure and administration, that suffered under the prolonged foreign occupation by the neighbouring empires of Russia, Prussia, and Austria-Hungary. However, as a third of recreated Poland's population was ethnically non-Polish and many felt their own nationhood aspirations thwarted specifically by Poland, large segments of this population resisted to varying degrees the policies intended to assimilate them. Part of the country's leadership emphasised the need for the long-term ethnic and cultural homogeneity of the state. However, the promotion of the Polish language in administration, public life and especially education, were perceived by some as an attempt at forcible homogenisation. In areas inhabited by ethnic Ukrainians, for example, actions of the Polish authorities seen as aiming at restricting the influence of the Orthodox and the Ukrainian Greek Catholic Church caused additional resentment and were considered to be closely tied to religious Polonization.

== Medieval Poland ==
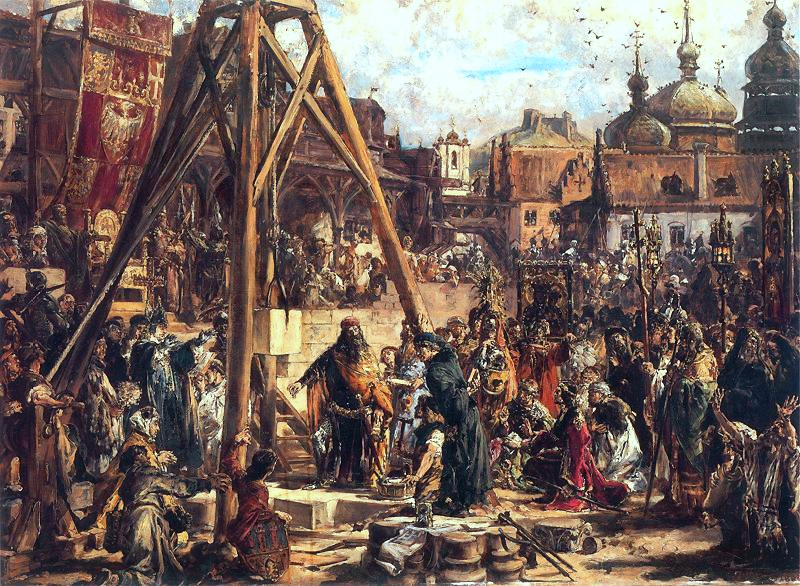
The Second Taking of Ruthenia. Wealth and Education, 1888 oil painting by Jan Matejko depicting the cornerstone laying for the first Roman Catholic church in Lviv by Casimir III the Great of Poland

Between the 12th and the 14th centuries, a number of towns in Poland adopted Magdeburg rights that promoted the towns' development and trade. The rights were usually granted by the king on the occasion of the arrival of migrants. Some integrated with the larger community, such as merchants who settled there, especially Greeks and Armenians. They adopted most aspects of Polish culture but kept their Orthodox faith. In western Poland, many townspeople were Germans. Initially, trade guilds had been exclusively German-speaking. However, this began to change by increasing Polonization in the 15th and 16th centuries. Since the Middle Ages, Polish culture, influenced by the West, in turn radiated East, beginning the long process of cultural assimilation.

== Polish–Lithuanian Union (1385–1795) ==
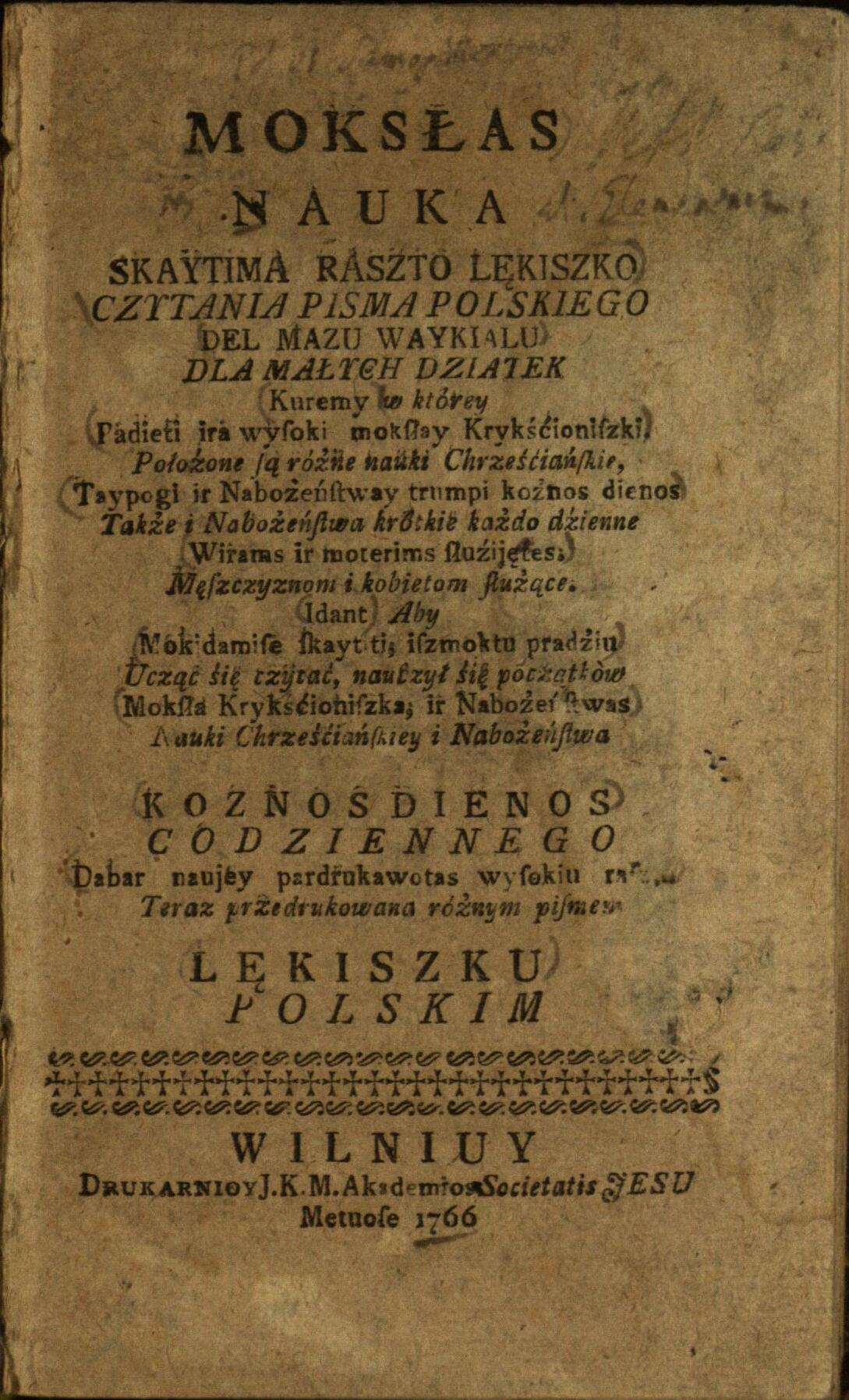
Polish language primer (in Lithuanian language), dedicated to ethnic Lithuanians, Vilnius, 1766

=== Grand Duchy of Lithuania ===
Poles reached Lithuania long before the union of the two countries. In a letter {when?} to the German Franciscans, Grand Duke Gediminas asked them to send monks who spoke Samogitian, Ruthenian or Polish. Other sources mention Polish slave carers and educators of children. This indicates the presence of Poles, probably prisoners of war or their descendants. Polish influence increased considerably after the Union of Krewo (1386). The Lithuanian Grand Duke Jogaila was offered the Polish crown and became Władysław II Jagiełło (reigned 1386–1434). This marked the beginning of the gradual, voluntary Polonization of the Lithuanian nobility. Jagiełło built multiple churches in pagan Lithuanian land and provided them generously with estates, gave out the lands and positions to the Catholics, settled the cities and villages and granted the biggest cities and towns Magdeburg rights in their Polish variant.

Lithuanian nobles were granted privileges modelled on those held by the Polish nobility. 47 families of Lithuanian families were adopted by 45 Polish families and endowed with Polish coats of arms. Lithuania adopted Polish political solutions and institutions. The offices of voivodes and castellans appeared, and the country was divided into voivodeships and powiats. There was also a representation of the nobility, called Sejm, following the Polish model. However, unlike the Polish Sejm, the magnates had the deciding vote, and the petty and middle nobility only approved the decisions of the magnate's council. Since the late 15th century marriages between Lithuanian and Polish magnates became more frequent. This brought the Lithuanians even closer to Polish culture. The first such marriage was the one between Mikołaj Tęczyński and the daughter of Alekna Sudimantaitis in 1478.

Polish influence intensified in the period preceding the Union of Lublin. The royal court took steps to make the political and economic system of Lithuania more similar to Poland. An important step was the introduction of the hide system (Volok Reform – Polish: reforma włóczna), based on the Polish model. The reform was introduced by specialists from Poland, mainly from Mazovia, headed by Piotr Chwalczewski. Włóka was a Polish measure of land (in Ruthenian, volok), and in Lithuania, it became the basis for land measurement. At the same time, Polish measures of area and distance were introduced, as well as a model of farming based on the folwark and three-field system.

During the Reformation, voices were raised that Latin should be the language of the Lithuanians, due to the alleged proximity of the two languages and the legendary origin of the Lithuanian nobility from the Romans. However, this intention failed and Latin never reached the same position as in the Polish Crown. Instead, Polish quickly took the place of the official language. At the beginning of the 17th-century instructions and resolutions of sejmiks were written down in Polish. In the period 1620–1630, the Polish language supplanted Ruthenian in the books of the Lithuanian Metrica. When in 1697 the Sejm of the Commonwealth passed a resolution to replace Ruthenian language by Polish in all official actions, it only approved the long-standing status quo. In addition to Polish, Latin was also used in the documents of the Lithuanian chancellery referring to the Catholic Church, cities under Magdeburg Law, Livonia and foreigners.

Already at the beginning of the 16th century, Polish became the first language of the Lithuanian magnates. In the following century, it was adopted by the Lithuanian nobility in general. Even the nobility of Žemaitija used the Polish language already in the 17th century. At the beginning of the 18th century, the Polish language was adopted by the entire nobility of the Grand Duchy – Lithuanian, Ruthenian, German and Tatar. The Polish language also penetrated other social strata: the clergy, the townspeople, and even the peasants.

Linguistic Polonization did not always mean full Polonization in the state or ethnic sense. The Lithuanian nobility felt united with the Polish nobility as part of one political nation of the Commonwealth, enjoying privileges, freedom and equality. In this sense, they often referred to themselves as "Polish nobility" or outright "Poles". At the same time, separatism and the defence of Lithuanian national separateness within the federation state were strong. The Lithuanian nobility was strongly attached to the laws, traditions and symbols of the Grand Duchy. Moreover, the Lithuanian separateness was also defended by the members of ethnically Polish families settling in Lithuania.

==== Church and education ====
The spread of Polish culture was channelled through the Catholic Church. A large part of the Lithuanian clergy were Poles, either of Polish descent or from Polish families settled in Lithuania. Of the 123 known canons of Vilnius, only slightly more than half (66) were ethnic Lithuanians, and most of the others were of Polish origin. The role of the church was important because it had a monopoly on teaching. By 1550, 11 schools were established in the Samogitian diocese and 85 in the Vilnius diocese. In 1528 the diocese of Vilnius decreed that the language of instruction of religious texts should be Polish and Lithuanian. Latin was taught exclusively in Polish, so children who did not know this language were taught Polish first. Lithuanians went to Kraków to study, in 1409 professor of theology founded a dormitory for students from Grand Duchy Overall 366 Lithuanian students studied in Kraków between 1430 and 1560. In the 16th-century students from Lithuania were coming to Kraków already considerably Polonized. In 1513, Lithuanian students were accused of mocking the plain Polish speech of their colleagues from Mazovia before the university court.

Polish had the advantage over Ruthenian and Lithuanian that its vocabulary, being influenced by Latin, allowed more abstract thoughts to be expressed. Moreover, its proximity to the Ruthenian language made its adoption all the more natural. The Reformation, on the one hand, accelerated the development of literatures in Lithuanian, on the other hand, it contributed to an even faster spread of the Polish language. The Calvinist magnate Mikołaj "the Black" Radziwiłł published in Brest a Polish translation of the Bible for the use of Lithuanian Calvinists.

==== Royal court ====
The second important channel for the spread of the Polish language and culture was the royal and grand ducal court. After 1447, only for short periods there was a separate grand ducal court in Vilnius. But even then the Polish influence was strong. Already Grand Duke Vytautas employed Polish secretaries to run his Latin chancellery. The Krakow court was dominated by Poles who travelled with the king to Lithuania. The Lithuanian nobles who joined the court were therefore greatly influenced by Polish culture. Casimir Jagiellon was the last grand duke to know Lithuanian. From the time of Zygmunt August, correspondence with the Lithuanian elite was conducted almost exclusively in Polish, since the knowledge of Latin in Lithuania was too weak.

=== Ruthenian lands ===
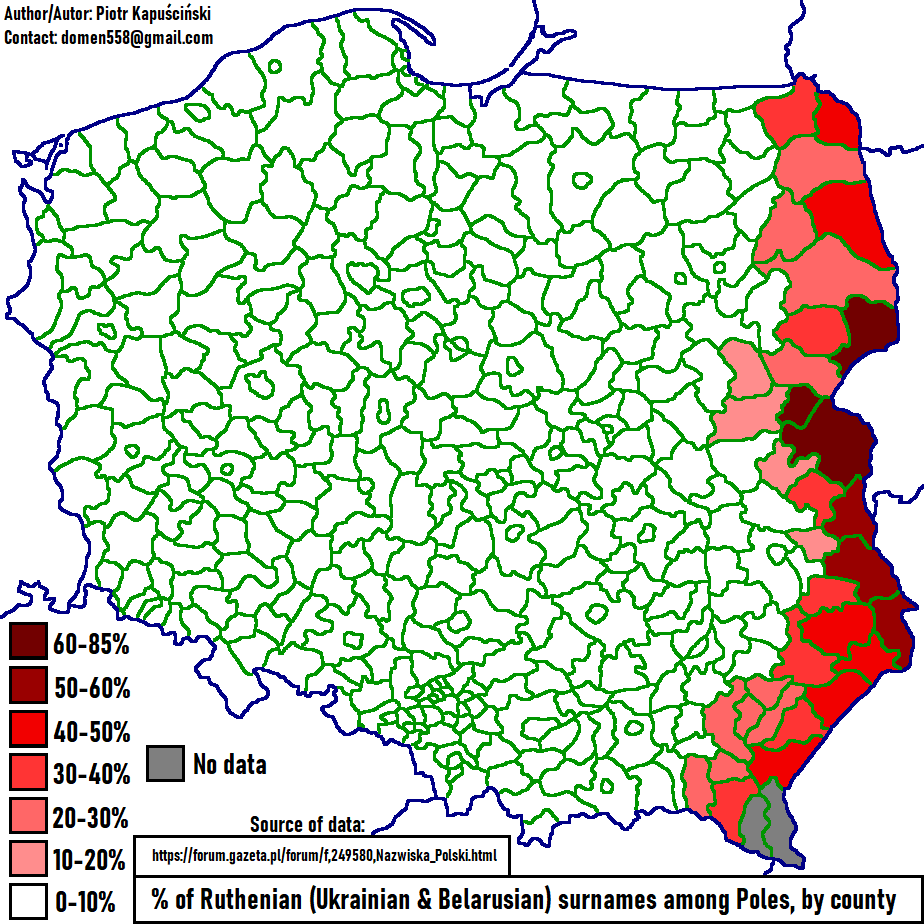
Percent of Poles with surnames of Ruthenian origin by county

Jogaila's successor Władysław III of Varna, who reigned in 1434–1444, expanded the privileges of the nobles to all Ruthenian nobles irrespective of their religion, and in 1443 signed a bull equalising the Orthodox church in rights with the Roman Catholicism thus alleviating the relationship with the Orthodox clergy. These policies continued under the next king Casimir IV Jagiellon. Still, the most cultural expansion of the Polish influence continued since the Ruthenian nobility were attracted by both the glamour of the Western culture and the Polish political order where the magnates became the unrestricted rulers of the lands and serfs in their vast estates.

In the 1569 Union of Lublin, the Ukrainian territories controlled by the Grand Duchy of Lithuania were transferred to the Crown of the Kingdom of Poland, and thus found themselves under the direct influence of the Polish culture and language.

Ukrainian lands of Kyiv and Braclav voivodeship were rather sparsely populated and attracted a lot of settlers, mostly from Volhynia, but also from central Poland. One of the reasons was that serfdom was not introduced there. Among the settlers was also a petty nobility. Ruthenian, just like Lithuanian, nobility was attracted by the Polish culture, which at that time flourished. A number of them adopted the Polish language and customs, even converted to Roman Catholicism. Even for those who remained faithful to the Orthodox Church and Ruthenian language, Polish political identity became very important, as they were inspiring to be part of szlachta – a ruling, privileged elite. It was at that time when the concept of gente Ruthenus, natione Polonus (a Poles of a Rus' religion) was born. It all resulted in the almost complete abandonment of Ruthenian culture, traditions and the Orthodox Church by the Ruthenian higher class.

The creation of the Greek Catholic Church, following the 1596 Union of Brest which sought to break the relations between Orthodox clergy in the Commonwealth and the Patriarchate in Moscow, put the Ruthenian people under stronger influence of Polish culture. The unia was supported by the Polish authorities. In addition to the Unia itself, the eventual Latinisation of the Unia was one of the components of Polonization. The unia was accompanied by the spread of the Roman Catholic Church in the Ruthenian lands. Dioceses of the Roman Catholic Church were established as early as the 14th and 15th centuries by the Grand Dukes of Lithuania. After the Union of Lublin Jesuit schools were established by Ruthenian magnates.

Some Ruthenian magnates like Sanguszko, Wiśniowiecki and Kisiel, resisted the cultural Polonization for several generations, with the Ostrogski family being one of the most prominent examples. Remaining generally loyal to the Polish state, the magnates, like Ostrogskis, stood by the religion of their forefathers, and supported the Orthodox Church generously by opening schools, printing books in Ruthenian language (the first four printed Cyrillic books in the world were published in Cracow, in 1491) and giving generously to the Orthodox churches' construction. However, their resistance was gradually waning with each subsequent generation as more and more of the Ruthenian elite turned towards Polish language and Catholicism. Still, with most of the educational system getting Polonized and the most generously funded institutions being to the west of Ruthenia, the Ruthenian indigenous culture further deteriorated. In the Polish Ruthenia the language of the administrative paperwork started to gradually shift towards Polish. By the 16th century the language of administrative paperwork in Ruthenia was a peculiar mix of the older Church Slavonic with the Ruthenian language of the commoners and the Polish language. With the Polish influence in the mix gradually increasing it soon became mostly like the Polish language superimposed on the Ruthenian phonetics. The total confluence of Ruthenia and Poland was seen coming.

=== Royal Prussia ===
Since Teutonic times the language of the Prussian elite and administration had been German. This did not change after the incorporation into the kingdom of Poland. It was only from the beginning of the 16th century that the role of the Polish language began to increase. Since 1527 there have been complaints from representatives of large cities that some council members use Polish, although they know German. In 1555, a canon of Gniezno delivered a speech to the Prussian Sejm in Polish, without the help of an interpreter. In the second half of the 16th century, royal decrees were issued in Polish, debates in the Landtag were held in Polish. Great Prussian families Polonized their names: the Baysen to Bażyński; the Zehmen to Cema; the Dameraw to Działyński, and the Mortangen to Mortęski, the Kleinfelds to Krupocki.

== Partitions (1795–1918) ==
Polonization also occurred during times when a Polish state did not exist, despite the empires that partition Poland applied the policies aimed at reversing the past gains of Polonization or aimed at replacing Polish identity and eradication of Polish national group.

The Polonization took place in the early years of the Prussian partition, where, as a reaction to the persecution of Roman Catholicism during the Kulturkampf, German Catholics living in areas with a Polish majority voluntarily integrated themselves within Polish society, affecting approximately 100,000 Germans in the eastern provinces of Prussia.

According to some scholars the biggest successes in Polonization of the non-Polish lands of former Commonwealth were achieved after the Partitions, in times of persecution of Polishness (noted by Leon Wasilewski) (1917), Mitrofan Dovnar-Zapolsky (1926). Paradoxically, the substantial eastward movement of the Polish ethnic territory (over these lands) and growth of the Polish ethnic regions were taking place exactly in the period of the strongest Russian attack on everything Polish in Lithuania and Belarus.

The general outline of causes for that is considered to include the activities of the Roman-Catholic Church and the cultural influence exacted by the big cities (Vilna, Kovno) on these lands, the activities of the Vilna Educational District in 19th century–1820s, the activities of the local administration, still controlled by the local Polish or already Polonized nobility up to the 1863–1864 January uprising, secret (Polish) schools in second half nineteenth to the beginning of the 20th century (tajne komplety) and the influence of the land estates.

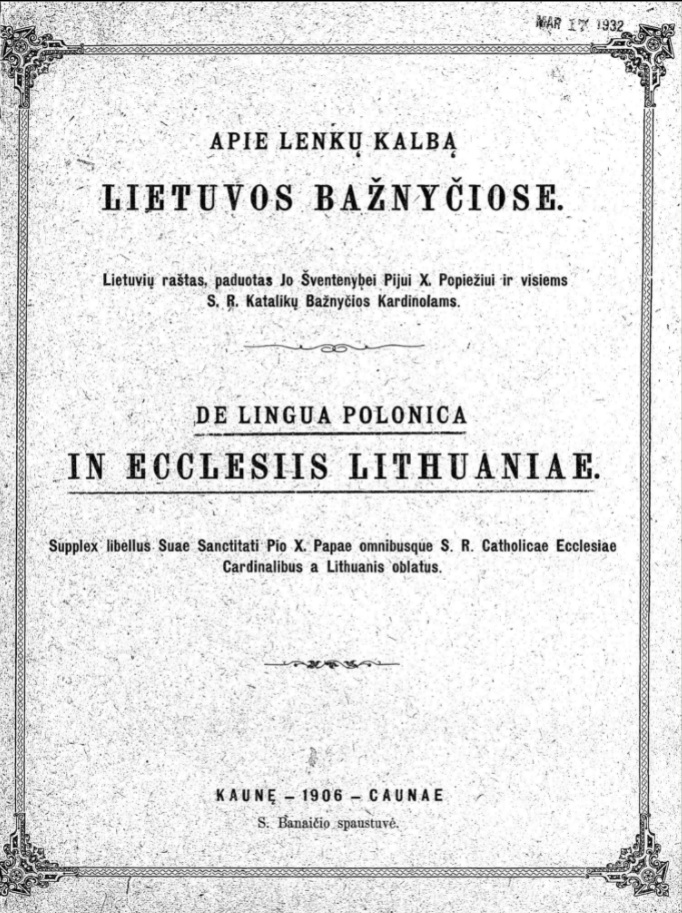
Lithuanians complaint to the Pope Pius X regarding the usage of the Polish language in the Lithuanian Catholic churches, 1906

Following the demise of the Polish–Lithuanian Commonwealth in the end of the 18th century, the Polonization trends initially continued in Lithuania, Belarus and Polish-dominated parts of Ukraine as the initially liberal policies of the Empire gave the Polish elite significant concessions in the local affairs. Dovnar-Zapolsky notes that the Polonization actually intensified under the liberal rule of Alexander I, particularly due to the efforts of Polish intellectuals who led the Vilnius University which was organised in 1802–1803 from the Academy in Vilna (Schola Princeps Vilnensis), vastly expanded and given the highest Imperial status under the new name Vilna Imperial University (Imperatoria Universitas Vilnensis). By the Emperor's order, the Vilna education district overseen by Adam Czartoryski, a personal friend of Alexander, was greatly expanded to include the vast territories in the West of the Russian Empire stretching to Kiev in south-east and much of the Polish territory and the development of the university, which had no rival in the whole district, received the highest priority of the Imperial authorities which granted it significant freedom and autonomy. With the effort of Polish intellectuals who served the rectors of the university, Hieronim Strojnowski, Jan Śniadecki, Szymon Malewski, as well as Czartoryski who oversaw them, the university became the centre of Polish patriotism and culture; and as the only University of the district the centre attracted the young nobility of all ethnicities from this extensive region.

With time, the traditional Latin was eliminated from the university and by 1816 it was fully replaced by Polish and Russian. This change both affected and reflected a profound change in the Belarusian and Lithuanian secondary schools systems where Latin was also traditionally used as the university was the main source of the teachers for these schools. Additionally, the university was responsible for the textbook selection and only Polish textbooks were approved for printing and usage.

Dovnar-Zapolsky notes that "the 1800s–1810s had seen the unprecedented prosperity of the Polish culture and language in the former Great Duchy of Lithuania lands" and "this era has seen the effective completion of the Polonization of the smallest nobility, with further reduction of the areal of use of the contemporary Belarusian language. also noting that the Polonization trend had been complemented with the (covert) anti-Russian and anti-Eastern Orthodox trends. The results of these trends are best reflected in the ethnic censuses in previously non-Polish territories.

Following the Polish November uprising aimed at breaking away from Russia, the Imperial policies finally changed abruptly.

In the 19th century, the mostly unchallenged Polonization trend of the previous centuries had been met staunchly by then "anti-Polish" Russification policy, with temporary successes on both sides, like Polonization rises in mid-1850s and in 1880s and Russification strengthenings in 1830s and in 1860s. Any Polonization of the east and west territories (Russian and German partitions) occurred in the situation were Poles had steadily diminishing influence on the government. Partition of Poland posed a genuine threat to the continuation of Polish language-culture in those regions. As Polonization was centred around Polish culture, policies aimed at weakening and destroying it had a significant impact on weakening Polonization of those regions. This was particularly visible in Russian-occupied Poland, where the Polish culture fared worst, as Russian administration gradually became strongly anti-Polish. After a brief and relatively liberal early period in the early 19th century, where Poland was allowed to retain some autonomy as the Congress Poland puppet state, the situation for Polish culture steadily worsened.

=== Lithuanian and Belarusian lands ===
A complicated linguistic situation developed on the territory of the Grand Duchy of Lithuania. Polish speakers used a "Kresy" variant of Polish (Northern Borderlands dialect) that retained archaic Polish features as well as a number of remnants of Belarusian and some features of Lithuanian. Linguists distinguish between official language, used in the Church and cultural activities, and colloquial language, closer to the speech of the common people. Inhabitants of a significant part of the Vilnius region used a variant of the Belarusian language, which was influenced mainly by Polish, but also by Lithuanian, Russian and Jewish. This language was referred to as "simple speech" (Polish: mowa prosta), and was treated by some as a dialect variety of Polish. In fact, it was a kind of "mixed language" serving as an interdialect of the cultural borderland. This language became a gateway to the progressive Slavization of the Lithuanian population.

The knowledge of Slavonic intedialect made it easier for Lithuanians to communicate with their Slavic neighbours, who spoke Polish, Russian, or Belarusian. The attractiveness and cultural prestige of the Polish language and its common use in church caused the process to continue and lead to the full adoption of the Polish language. Among the Belarusian population, the usage of Polish was limited to official relations, while at home, the local language was still spoken. As a result, the Lithuanian language retreated under the pressure of Polish faster than Belarusian. This led to the formation of a compact Polish language area between the Lithuanian and Belarusian language areas, with Vilnius as the centre. After some time, especially in the Vilnius region, ignorance of the Polish language was considered a lack of cultural savvy. In ceremonial situations it was advisable to use Polish. This gradually limited the use of simple speech to everyday life situations, and gave rise to a sense of contempt for it and Belarusian as the language of work, cursing, but also more emotional and impetuous.

In the Belarusian territories, the Polonization processes were intensified by the struggle of the Russian authorities against the Catholic Churches. The liquidation of the Uniate Church and forced conversions to Orthodoxy provoked resistance among the local community. The Russian authorities opposed the Catholic Church, called the "Polish faith", to the Orthodox Church, called the "Russian faith". As a result, referring to oneself as a "Pole" was the same as referring to oneself as a "Catholic." After Latin, Polish was considered the second language of worship, so attempts to replace it with Russian or local languages were resisted by local population.

The spread of Polish language and culture, and eventually Polish national consciousness, was fostered not only by its prevalence among the upper classes, but also among the impoverished, declassed nobility. Their representatives regarded the nobility's traditions, inextricably linked with Polishness, as a marker of prestige, so they cultivated their attachment to the Polish national tradition. And due to the lack of an impassable property and cultural barrier, they exerted influence on the surrounding peasantry. Paradoxically, this was fostered by the anti-Polish and anti-szlachta Russian policy, which gave relief to peasants for the purchase of land. As a result, the property gap between the petty gentry and the peasantry decreased, which resulted in the appearance of mixed marriages, which in turn led to the spread of Polish culture among the peasants.

The emergence of the Lithuanian national movement in the 1880s slowed down the process of Polonization of the ethnically Lithuanian population, but also cemented a sense of national identity among a significant portion of the Polish-speaking Lithuanian population. The feeling of a two-tier Lithuanian-Polish national identity, present throughout the period, had to give way to a clear national declaration. Previously, every inhabitant of the former Grand Duchy of Lithuania had been considered a Lithuanian, but in the face of the emergence of the Lithuanian national movement, which considered only those who spoke Lithuanian as Lithuanians, Polish-speaking residents of Lithuania more and more often declared themselves as Poles. The dispute over the auxiliary language of services (Polish or Lithuanian) in the churches on the eastern border of ethnic Lithuania, which heated up from the end of the nineteenth century, influenced the formation of Polish consciousness and the adoption of the Polish language among those believers whose ancestors had abandoned Lithuanian for plain speech.

The Lithuanian historian Vaidas Banys has said the following about Polonization within the Catholic Church of Lithuania in the 19th century:

"The 'Polonomaniacs' announced that the Catholic Church in Lithuania is a Polish church and no other national manifestations are welcome in it. Lithuanian religious services were obstructed, while there was whistling during Lithuanian singing and even fistfights. One event resounded throughout all of Lithuania in 1901, when a jubilee cross with a Lithuanian inscription was thrown away from Šėta's church. So-called 'Lithuanomaniacs' (Polish: litwomany) priests were punished, moved to poorer parishes, or humiliated in their ministry."

== Second Polish Republic (1918–1939) ==
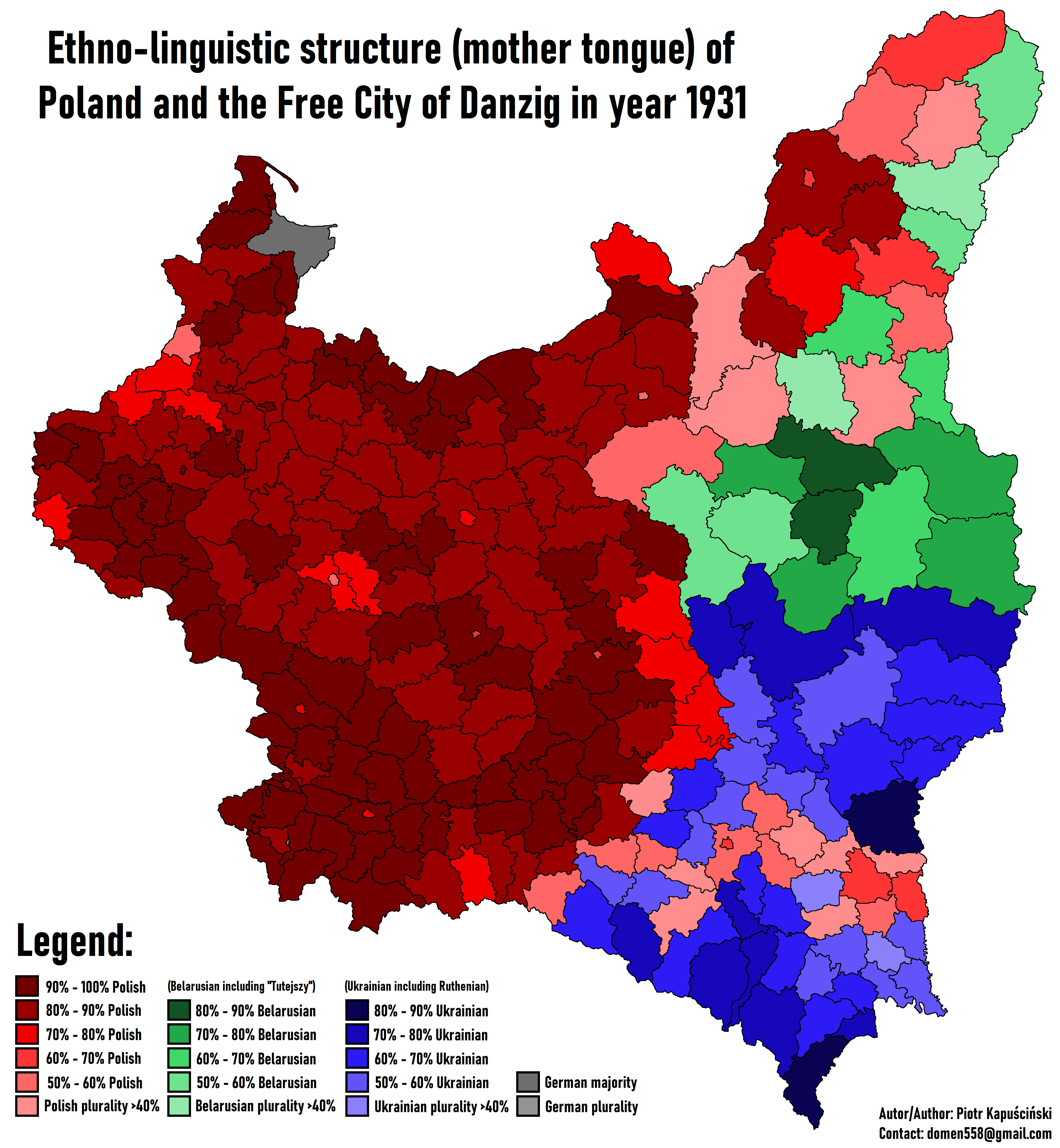
Linguistic map of Poland according to the 1931 Polish census.

According to the Polish census of 1921 ethnically Polish population constituted about 69% of the population of the reborn state. The largest minorities in interwar Poland were Ukrainians, Jews, Belarusians and Germans. The Polish government's policy toward each minority varied, and also changed over time. In general, during the first period of democratic rule dominated by national democracy, there was a tendency to restrict the rights of minorities and pursue Polonization. This changed with the 1926 coup and the assumption of power by Sanation. Policies became more liberal and minority autonomy increased. However, this began to change for the worse a few years before the start of World War II.

Assimilation was considered by National Democrats to be a major factor for "unifying the state". They hoped that the attractiveness of Polish culture, above all to Slavic minorities, would help to make rapid peaceful assimilation without much resistance. The centrist and leftist parties pointed out that the nation-building processes in the eastern lands could not be reversed. They called, therefore, for conducting so-called state assimilation, that is, granting broad cultural and territorial autonomy, in exchange for loyalty to the Polish state. Such policy was partially conducted by the Sanation regime, especially under leadership of Józef Piłsudski in years 1926–1935.

Polonization also created a new educated class among the non-Polish minorities, a class of intellectuals aware of the importance of schooling, press, literature and theatre, who became instrumental in the development of their own ethnic identities.

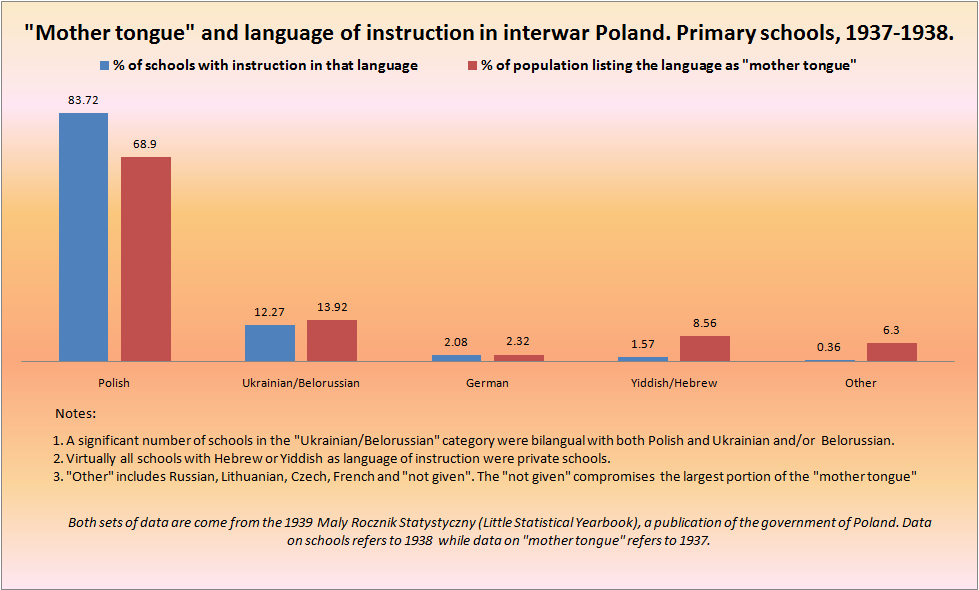
Language of instruction in interwar Polish schools and percent of population listing a particular language as "mother tongue", as claimed by official Polish statistics for 1937 and 1938

=== Belarusians ===
Belarusians in Poland were a poorly educated group, 90% of them making their living by farming. The aspiration of the Belarusians was to achieve cultural autonomy, as well as fair land reform. The maximum number of people of Belarusian nationality in interwar Poland was about 2 million. It is difficult to determine a definite number because for the most part, they did not have an established sense of their national identity; they described their language as "Tutejszy" "simple speech" (Polish: mowa prosta) or "Poleshuk" (in Polesia). Additionally, after two centuries of Polish influence, Catholic Belarusians naturally leaned toward Polish culture and often referred to themselves as "Poles" even though they spoke Belarusian.

The Polish state's policy toward them was not consistent. Initially, during the period of fighting over the eastern border, the activities of Belarusian activists were tolerated. However, this changed after the peace came. In 1924, the Law on Minority Education led to the closure of a huge part of the approximately 350 (or 514) existing Belarusian schools, opened mostly during the German occupation. 19 bilingual schools and just three elementary Belarusian schools remained. Officials prevented the creation of new schools, despite meeting formal conditions.

The change came after the May Coup of 1926. Despite the abolition of the Belarusian Belarusian Social Democratic Party, for its contacts with the Comintern, there was a period of liberalisation of educational policy. The new Minister of Education, Gustav Dobrotsky, ordered the dismissal of officials blocking the establishment of new schools, allowed new schools to open in Catholic communities as well, and organised Belarusian language courses for elementary school teachers. As a result, four Belarusian grammar schools and a dozen elementary schools were opened. The results, however, were poor. In 1928, there were only 69 schools with the Belarusian language, all of them in Wilno and Nowogródek voivodeships, a small number in comparison with 2 164 Polish schools existing there. The reversal of this policy came quickly, and after 1929 the number of Belarusian schools began to decline again. Of the Belarusian gymnasiums existing in Vilnius, Navahrudak, Kletsk and Radashkovichy, only the Vilnius gymnasium had survived to 1939. Belarusian schools often conducted classes in Russian, this was especially true of gymnasiums. This resulted from the significant Russification of the Belarusian intelligentsia. The Polish officials often treated any Belarusian demanding schooling in Belarusian language as a Soviet spy and any Belarusian social activity as a product of a communist plot.

Orthodox Christians also faced discrimination in interwar Poland. This discrimination was also targeting assimilation of Eastern Orthodox Belarusians. The Polish authorities were imposing Polish language in Orthodox church services and ceremonies, initiated the creation of Polish Orthodox Societies in various parts of West Belarus (Slonim, Białystok, Vaŭkavysk, Navahrudak).

Belarusian Roman Catholic priests like Fr. Vincent Hadleŭski who promoted Belarusian language in the church and Belarusian national awareness were also under serious pressure by the Polish regime and the leadership of the Catholic Church in Poland. The Polish Catholic Church issued documents to priests prohibiting the usage of the Belarusian language rather than Polish language in Churches and Catholic Sunday Schools in West Belarus. A 1921 Warsaw-published instruction of the Polish Catholic Church criticised the priests introducing the Belarusian language in religious life: They want to switch from the rich Polish language to a language that the people themselves call simple and shabby.

The Belarusian civil society resisted Polonization and mass closure of Belarusian schools. The Belarusian Schools Society (Belarusian: Таварыства беларускай школы), led by Branisłaŭ Taraškievič and other activists, was the main organisation promoting education in Belarusian language in West Belarus in 1921–1937.

Compared to the (larger) Ukrainian minority living in Poland, Belarusians were much less politically aware and active. Nevertheless, according to Belarusian historians, the policies by the Polish government against the population of West Belarus increasingly provoked protests and armed resistance. In the 1920s, Belarusian partisan units arose in multiple areas of West Belarus, mostly unorganised but sometimes led by activists of Belarusian left wing parties. In the spring of 1922, several thousands Belarusian partisans issued a demand to the Polish government to stop the violence, to liberate political prisoners and to grant autonomy to West Belarus. Protests were held in various regions of West Belarus until mid 1930s.

The largest Belarusian political organisation, the Belarusian Peasants' and Workers' Union (or, the Hramada), which demanded a stop to the Polonization and autonomy for West Belarus, grew more radicalised by the time. It received logistical help from the Soviet Union, and financial aid from the Comintern. By 1927 Hramada was controlled entirely by agents from Moscow. It was banned by the Polish authorities, and further opposition to the Polish government was met with state-imposed sanctions once the connection between Hramada and the more radical pro-Soviet Communist Party of Western Belarus was discovered. The Polish policy was met with armed resistance.

=== Ukrainians ===
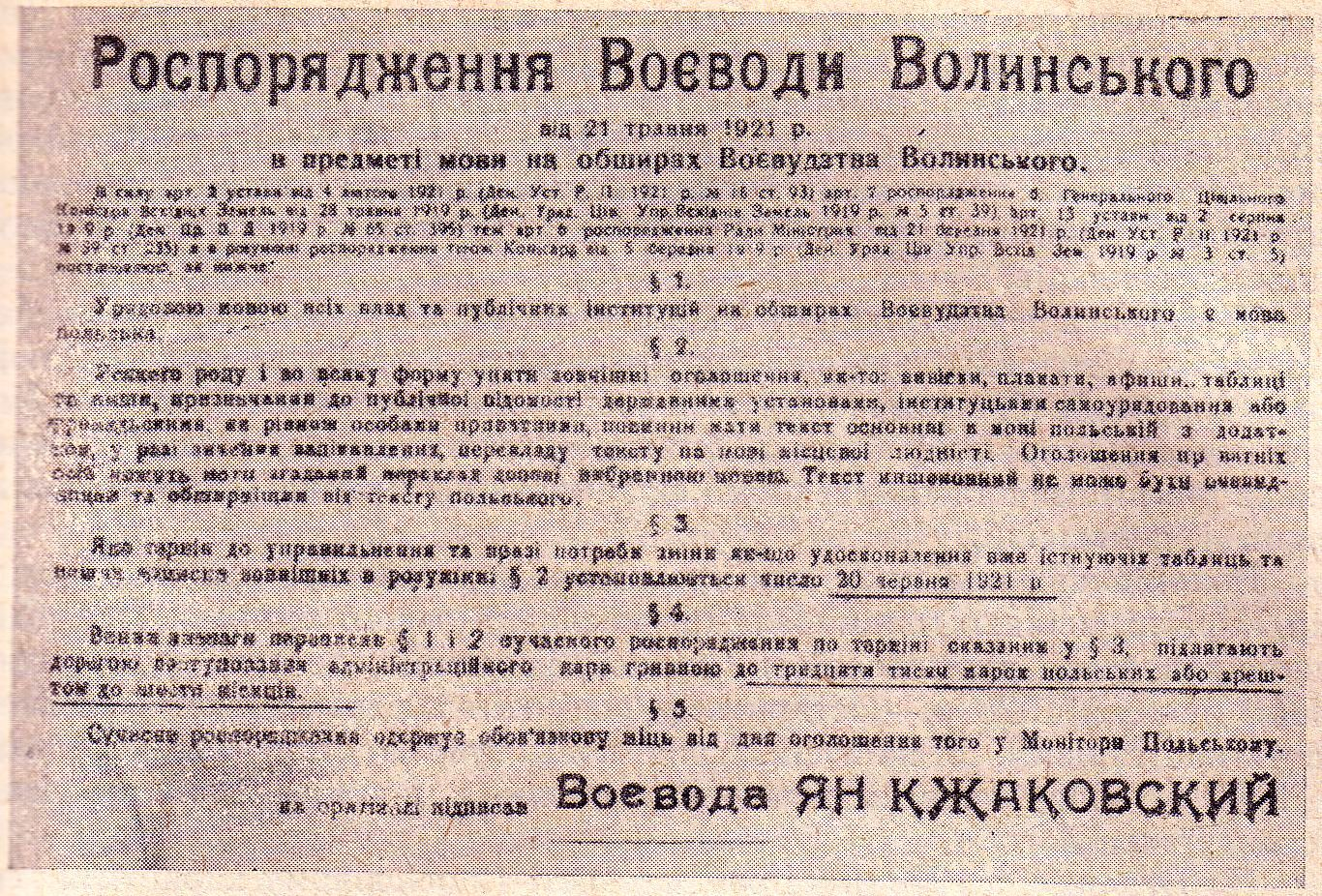
Decree of the first governor of Wołyń (Volhynia), Jan Krzakowski: "On language in the Volhynian Province", establishing Polish as the official language in accordance with the 1921 Treaty of Riga after the Polish–Soviet War in which the frontiers between Poland and the Soviet Russia had been defined. Written in Ukrainian

Interwar Poland was inhabited by 4-5 million Ukrainians. They lived primarily in the areas of Eastern Galicia and Volhynia. Until the First World War, Galicia with its large Ukrainian Greek Catholic population in the east (around Lviv) was controlled by the Austrian Empire. On the other hand, the Ukrainians of Volhynia, formerly of the Russian Empire (around Rivne), were largely Orthodox, and were influenced by strong Russophile trends. National self-identification was much stronger among the Galician Ukrainians.

==== Religion ====
While the Ukrainian Greek Catholic Church, which is in communion with the Catholic Church, hoped to receive a better treatment in Poland where the leadership saw Catholicism as one of the main tools to unify the nation – the Poles under Stanisław Grabski saw the restless Galician Ukrainians as less reliable than the Eastern Orthodox Volhynian Ukrainians, seen as better candidates for gradual assimilation. That's why the Polish policy in Ukraine initially aimed at keeping Greek Catholic Galicians from further influencing Orthodox Volhynians by drawing the so-called "Sokalski line".

Due to the region's history the Ukrainian Greek Catholic Church attained a strong Ukrainian national character, and the Polish authorities sought to weaken it in various ways. In 1924, following a visit with Ukrainian Greek Catholics in North America and western Europe, the head of the Ukrainian Greek Catholic Church was initially denied reentry to Lviv for a considerable amount of time. Polish priests led by their bishops began to undertake missionary work among Eastern Catholics, and the administrative restrictions were placed on the Ukrainian Greek Catholic Church.

With respect to the Eastern Orthodox Ukrainian population in eastern Poland, the Polish government initially issued a decree defending the rights of the Orthodox minorities. In practice, this often failed, as the Catholics, also eager to strengthen their position, had official representation in the Sejm and the courts. Any accusation was strong enough for a particular church to be confiscated and handed over to the Catholic Church. The goal of the two so called "revindication campaigns" was to reverse the gains of the Orthodox Church from the partitions period and to return to the Catholics those churches that had been converted into Orthodox churches by the Russian authorities. 190 Orthodox churches were destroyed, some of the destroyed churches were abandoned, and 150 more were forcibly transformed into Roman Catholic (not Greek Catholic) churches. Such actions were condemned by the head of the Ukrainian Greek Catholic Church, metropolitan Andrei Sheptytsky, who claimed that these acts would "destroy in the souls of our non-united Orthodox brothers the very thought of any possible reunion."

==== Education ====
The Polish administration closed a number of the Prosvita reading rooms. The number of reading rooms declined from 2,879 in 1914 to only 843 in 1923. The decline can be partially explained by the war devastation.

In independent Poland, education was centralised, and provincial school administration was abolished, as happened with Lwów-based separate Ukrainian representation. In 1924 the law was passed, which set up bilingual Ukrainian and Polish schools. As a result, number of Ukrainian unilingual schools declined, and they were replaced by bilingual schools. This affected Eastern Galicia most severely, where before the war there were 2,400 Ukrainian elementary schools, and during the existence of the West Ukrainian People's Republic their number increased to about 3,000. After the region was annexed to Poland, the number began to decline, in 1923 it was 2453, in 1925 it was still 2151, but after the introduction of bilingual schools there was a rapid decline to 648 schools in 1930 and 352 in 1938. At the same time, the number of bilingual schools grew from 9 in 1925 to 1,793 in 1930 and to 2,485 in 1938. The number of Polish schools also declined from 2,568 schools in 1925 to 2,161 in 1938.

The principle of "numerus clausus" had been introduced following which the Ukrainians were discriminated when entering the Uniwersytet Jana Kazimierza (not more than 15% of the applicants' total number, the Poles enjoying not less than the 50% quota at the same time).

==== Land reform ====
The land reform was designed to favour ethnic Polish population. By 1938 some 800,000 hectares had been redistributed within Ukrainian-inhabited areas. The redistribution did not necessarily help the local Ukrainian population, however. In 1920 in Volhynia and Polissia 39 percent of the allotted land (312,000 hectares) had been awarded to Polish war veterans. In Eastern Galicia 200,000 hectare had been given to Polish peasants from the western provinces of the country. By the 1930s the number of Poles living within contiguous Ukrainian ethnographic territory had increased by about 300,000.

=== Lithuanians ===
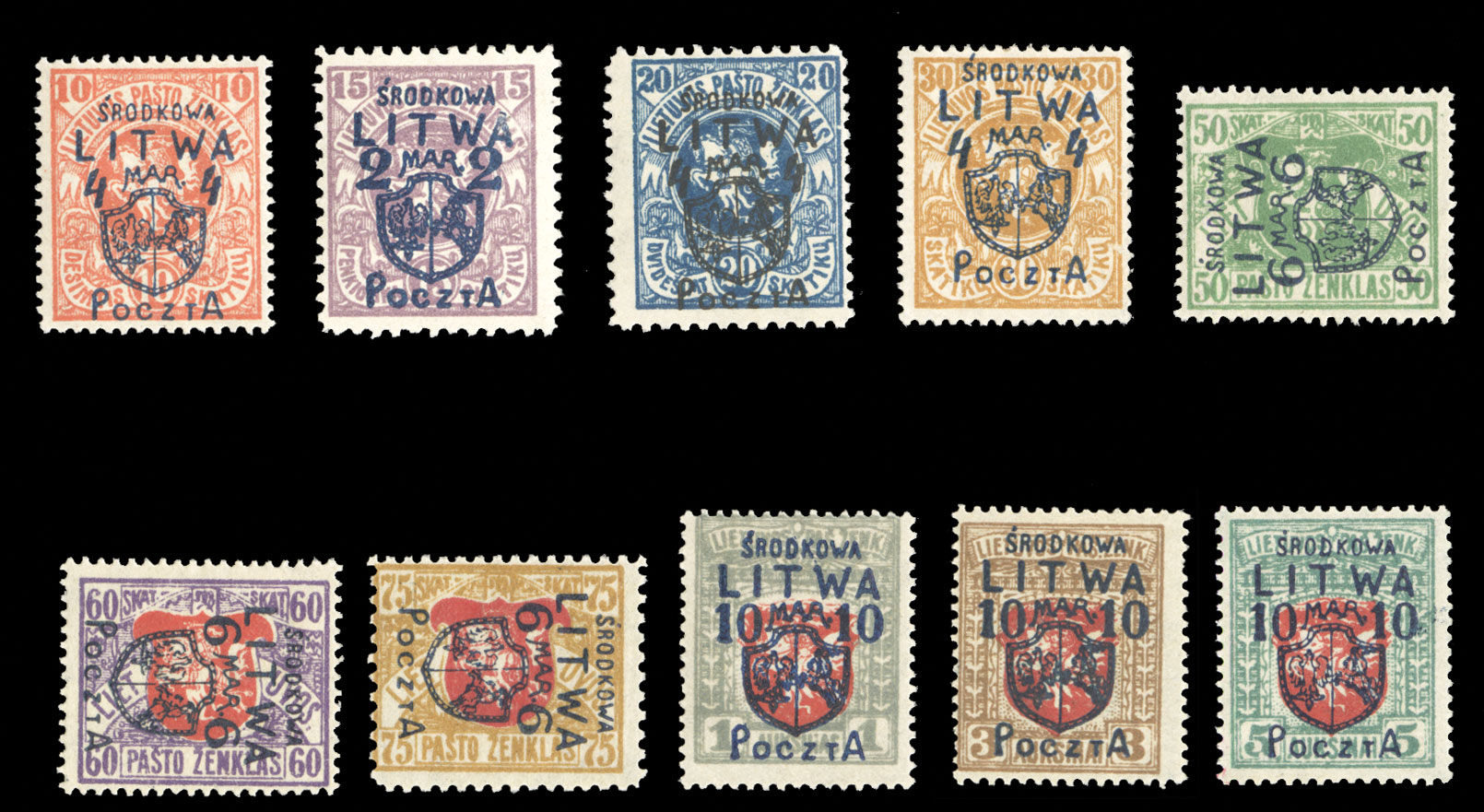
Lithuanian postage stamps with Polish overprints of Central Lithuania (Środkowa Litwa), made in 1920

During the interwar period of the 20th century (1920–1939), Lithuanian–Polish relations were characterised by mutual enmity. As a consequence of the conflict over the city of Vilnius, and the Polish–Lithuanian War, both governments – in the era of nationalism which was sweeping through Europe – treated their respective minorities harshly. In 1920, after the staged mutiny of Lucjan Żeligowski, Lithuanian cultural activities in Polish controlled territories were limited and the closure of Lithuanian newspapers and the arrest of their editors occurred. 33 Lithuanian and Belarusian cultural activists were formally expelled from Vilnius on 23 January 1922 and deported to Lithuania. In 1927, as tensions between Lithuania and Poland increased, 48 additional Lithuanian schools were closed and another 11 Lithuanian activists were deported. Following Piłsudski's death in 1935, the Lithuanian minority in Poland again became an object of Polonization policies with greater intensity. 266 Lithuanian schools were closed after 1936 and almost all Lithuanian organisations were banned. Further Polonization ensued as the government encouraged settlement of Polish army veterans in the disputed regions. About 400 Lithuanian reading rooms and libraries were closed in Poland between 1936 and 1938. Following the 1938 Polish ultimatum to Lithuania, Lithuania re-established diplomatic relations with Poland and efforts to Polonize Lithuanians living in Poland decreased somewhat.

== Post–World War II ==
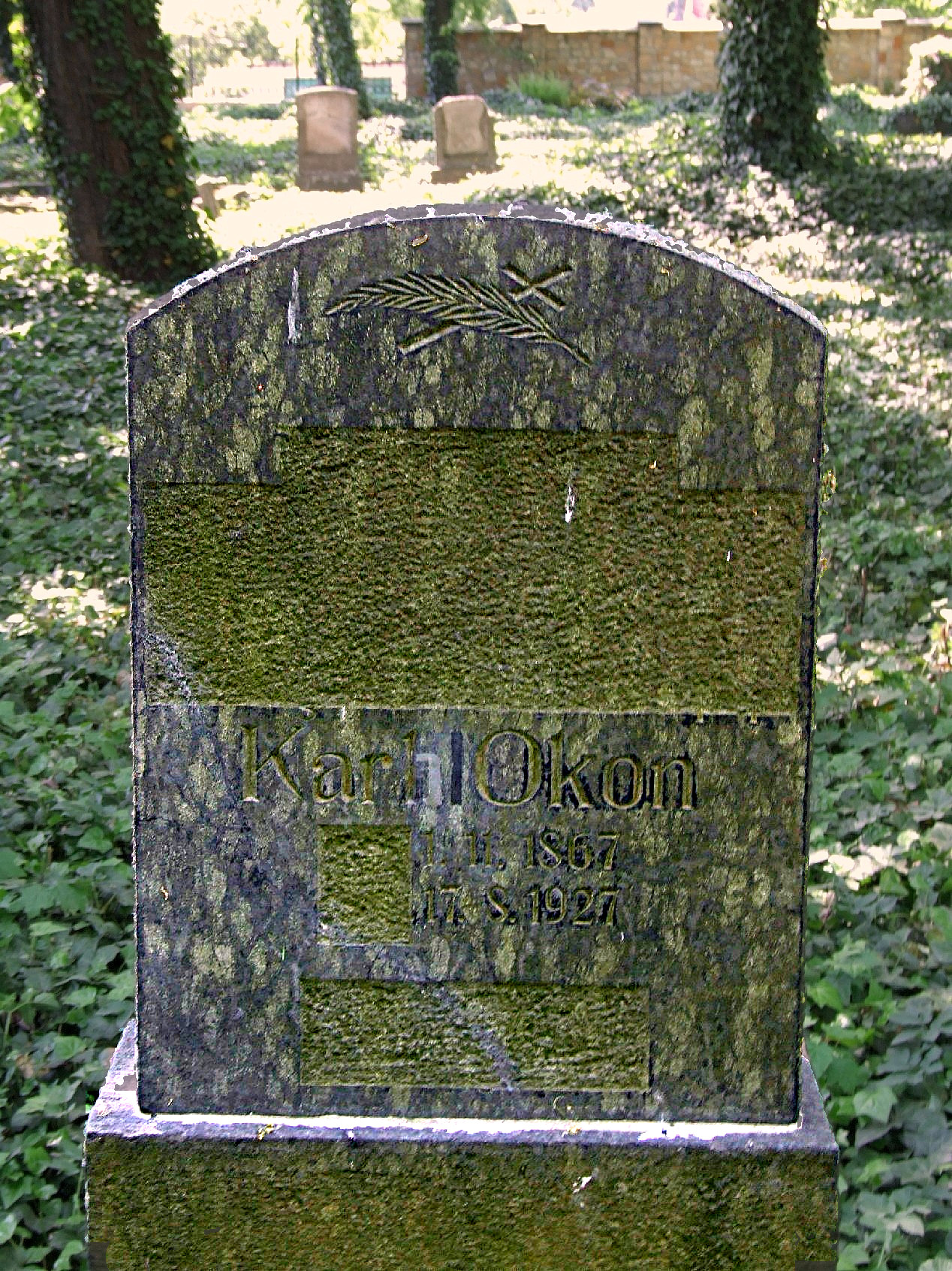
Gravestone with removed German inscriptions on a cemetery in Gliwice. Also visible is the changing of the name Karl into the Polish Karol

During Operation Vistula of 1947, the Soviet-controlled Polish communist authorities removed the support base for the still active in that area Ukrainian Insurgent Army by forcibly resettling about 141,000 civilians residing around Bieszczady and Low Beskids to northern areas of the so-called Recovered Territories awarded by the Allies to Poland in the post-war settlement. The farmers received financial help from the Polish government and took over homes and farms left behind by the displaced Germans, in most cases improving their living conditions due to the increased size of the newly reassigned properties, brick buildings, and running water. Dr Zbigniew Palski from IPN explains that an identical operation was performed in Ukraine by the Ukrainian Soviet Socialist Republic at exactly the same time. It was dubbed Operation West. Both operations were coordinated from Moscow; however, there was a shocking difference between their outcomes.

== Bibliography ==
- Davies, Norman (2005). God's Playground: A History of Poland, Vol. 1: The Origins to 1795. Columbia University Press. ISBN 0-231-12817-7.
- Frost, Robert I. (2015). The Oxford History of Poland-Lithuania. The Making of the Polish-Lithuanian Union, 1385—1569. Vol. 1. Oxford.
- Januszewska-Jurkiewicz, Joanna (2010). Stosunki narodowościowe na Wileńszczyźnie w latach 1920–1939 [National Relations in the Vilnius Region in the Years 1920–1939]. Katowice.
- Kaczmarek, Ryszard (2010). Historia Polski 1914-1989. Warsaw.
- Tomasz Kamusella. 2013. Germanization, Polonization, and Russification in the Partitioned Lands of Poland–Lithuania (pp 815–838). Nationalities Papers. Vol 41, No 5.
- Litwin Henryk, Central European Superpower, BUM Magazine, 2016.
- Magocsi, Robert Paul (1996). A History of Ukraine. University of Toronto Press. p. 596. ISBN 0802078206.
- Magocsi, Paul Robert (2010). A History of Ukraine. The Land and Its Peoples (2nd ed.). Toronto.
- Mironowicz, Eugeniusz (2007). Białorusini i Ukraińcy w polityce obozu piłsudczykowskiego [Belarusians and Ukrainians in the policies of the Pilsudski party] (in Polish). Wydawnictwo Uniwersyteckie Trans Humana. ISBN 978-83-89190-87-1.
- Ostrówka, Małgorzata (2005). "Polszczyzna w Wielkim Księstwie Litewskim. Aspekt arealny i historyczny". Kultura i języki Wielkiego Księstwa Litewskiego. Kraków. pp. 103–116.
- Rachuba, Andrzej (2010). "Litwini". In Kopczyński, Michał; Tygielski, Wojciech (eds.). Pod wspólnym niebem. Narody dawnej Rzeczypospolitej [Under a Common Sky. Peoples of the former Commonwealth] (in Polish). Warsaw. ISBN 978-83-11-11724-2.
- Snyder, Timothy (2004). The reconstruction of nations: Poland, Ukraine, Lithuania, Belarus, 1569–1999. Yale University Press. ISBN 0-300-10586-X.
- Subtelny, Orest (1988). Ukraine: A History. Toronto: University of Toronto Press. ISBN 0-8020-5808-6.
- Shved, Viachaslau; Grzybowski, Jerzy (2020). Historia Białorusi. Od czasów najdawniejszych do roku 1991 [History of Belarus. From the earliest times to 1991] (in Polish). Warsaw: WUW.
- Trimonienė, Rita (2006). "Polonizacja". Kultura Wielkiego Księstwa Litewskiego. Analizy i obrazy. Kraków. pp. 544–560.
- Walasek, Stefania (2021). "Szkolnictwo dla mniejszości narodowych w II Rzeczpospolitej na przykładzie kuratoriów okręgów szkolnych: lwowskiego i wileńskiego" [Education for national minorities in the Second Polish Republic on the example of school boards of school districts: Lviv and Vilnius]. Przegląd Historyczno-Oświatowy. 64 (3–4).
