= Anna Radziwiłł (disambiguation) =

Anna Radziwiłł (1939 –2009) was a Polish politician. Anna Radziwiłł or Anna Radziwiłłowa may also refer to:

- Anna Radziwiłł (died 1522)
- Anna Radziwiłłowa (1567–1617)
- Anna Radziwiłłówna Kiszczyna (died 1600)
