= Alekna =

- Lithuanian surname
- m.: Alekna
- f.: (unmarried): Aleknaitė
- f.: (married): Aleknienė
- Related names: Olechno, Alekhna/Olekhno, Alyakhno/Alyokhna

Alekna is a Lithuanian-language surname and a historical diminutive derived from East Slavic Alexei or Aleksandr (corresponding to Belarusian Alekhna/Olekhno, Polish Olechno, and Russian Alyakhno/Alyokhna), which is a cognate of Alexius or Alexander.

== Notable people ==
Notable people who bear this name include:

- Alekna Sudimantaitis, Alekna, son of Sudimantas (died 1490/1491), Lithuanian noble
- Jurgis Alekna (1873–1952), Lithuanian physician and activist
- Martynas Alekna (born 2000), Lithuanian discus thrower
- Mykolas Alekna (born 2002), Lithuanian discus thrower
- Vilija Aleknaitė-Abramikienė (born 1957), Lithuanian politician and musicologist
- Virgilijus Alekna (born 1972), Lithuanian discus thrower
