= Petras Simonas Gedgaudas =

Lithuanian noble and diplomat (d. 1951)

Leliwa coat of arms

Petras Simonas Gedgaudas (Polish: Piotr Senko Giedygołdowicz; died in 1451) was a Lithuanian noble and diplomat. He briefly was a regent of Polotsk (equivalent to the later Voivode of Polotsk) in 1440, regent of Smolensk (Voivode of Smolensk) in 1447–1451, and castellan of Vilnius in 1451.

== Biography ==
Gedgaudas is first recorded in surviving document in 1429. At the time, he was a court marshal and was sent on a diplomatic mission to Sigismund, Holy Roman Emperor. The next year he was an envoy to Pope Martin V. These missions were related to the attempts to crown Grand Duke Vytautas as King of Lithuania. After Grand Duke Švitrigaila was deposed in 1432, Gedgaudas' father Jurgis Gedgaudas continued to support him and was taken prisoner in the Battle of Ashmyany. Nevertheless, Jurgis regained royal favor and his son Petras even received Mir from Sigismund Kęstutaitis in 1434. In 1447, Gedgaudas accompanied Casimir Jagiellon to his coronation in Kraków. The following year, he was sent on a diplomatic mission to the Grand Duchy of Moscow. It is assumed that he died in 1451 as his last will was written that year.

== Family and property ==
His father was Jurgis Gedgaudas, diplomat and voivode of Vilnius. Gedgaudas married Milochna, daughter of Mykolas Kęsgaila, Elder of Samogitia and ancestor of the Kęsgailos family. The couple had no children, but they adopted Milochna's relative (most likely her niece Anna). After Anna's death, Milochna adopted her nephew Jerzy Iwanowicz Ilinicz.

Just like his father, Gedgaudas used the Leliwa coat of arms and considered Vishnyeva his principal estate. After his death, the town was inherited by his cousin Jonas Manvydas. Gedgaudas funded a Catholic church in Vishnyeva in 1451. He also funded a church in Radashkovichy in 1447; his widow Milochna donated additional funds in 1485. She also donated to Vilnius Cathedral in 1475.

Petras Gedgaudas should not be confused with another Petras Gedgaudas, a local Samogitian noble, who founded a Catholic church in Šiluva in 1457 and who was the Elder of Samogitia in 1441-1443.
