= Jan Radziwiłł =

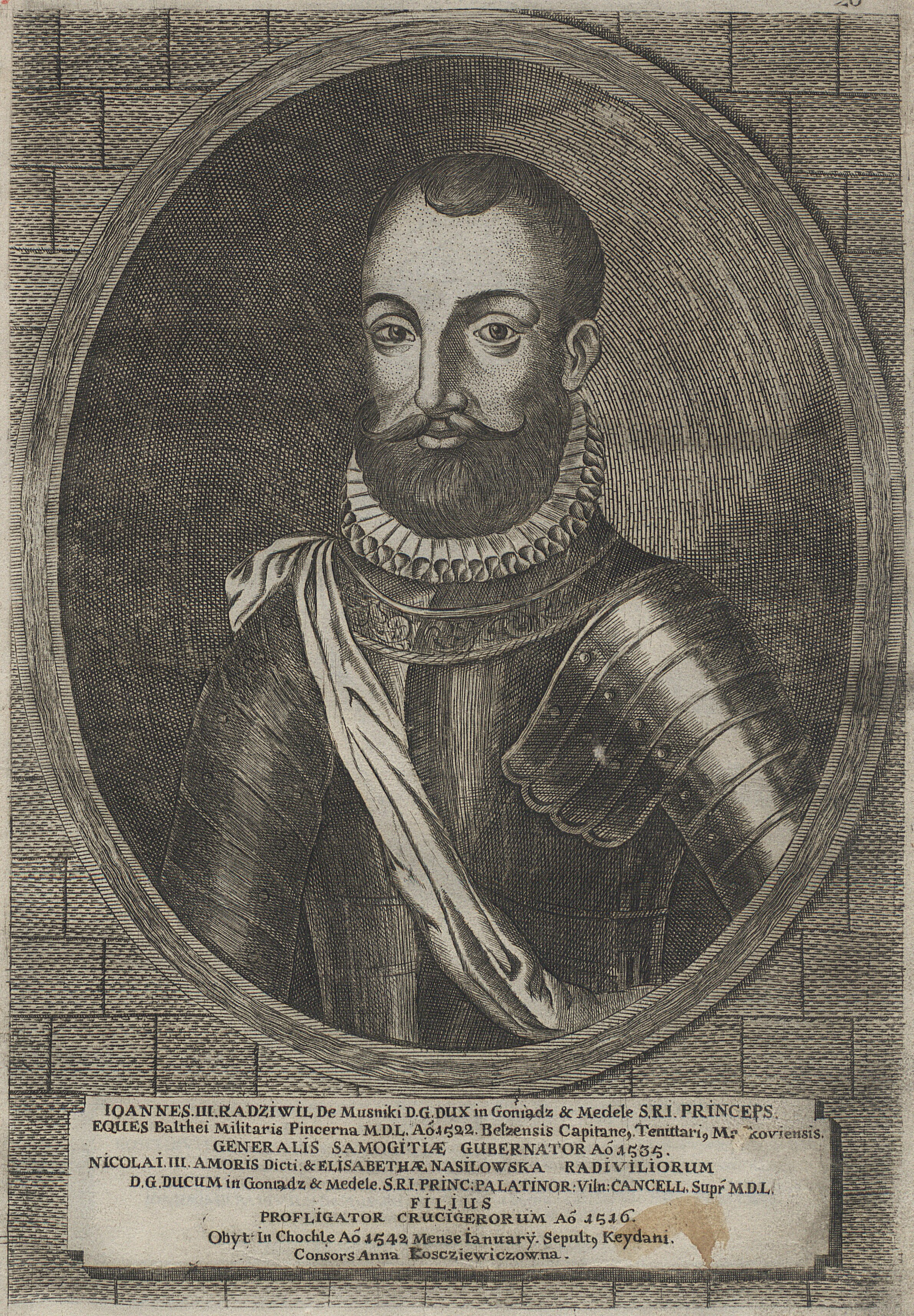
- Born: 1492; Goniądz, Grand Duchy of Lithuania (now in Poland)
- Died: January 1542 (aged 49–50); Chochło
- Spouse: Anna Kostevicz
- Children: with Anna Kostevicz: Anna Radziwiłł; Petronele Radziwiłł; Elzbieta Radziwiłł
- Parent(s): Mikolaj Radziwiłł; Elźbieta Sakowicz

Jan Radziwiłł (1492 – January 1542) was the Deputy Cup-Bearer of Lithuania and the Elder of Samogitia since 1535 until death. He was a grandson of Mikalojus Radvila the Old and the only son of Mikołaj II Radziwiłł. He had no male heirs therefore he was the last from the Goniądz-Meteliai Radziwiłł family line.

Ancestors of Jan Radziwiłł

8. Radvila Astikas
4. Mikalojus Radvila the Old
9. NN
2. Mikołaj Radziwiłł II
10. NN
5. Sofija Ona Manvydaitė
11. NN
1. Jan Radziwiłł
12. NN
6. NN
13. NN
3. Elźbieta Sakowicz
14. NN
7. NN
15. NN
