= Mikołaj II Radziwiłł =

Magnate and statesman of the Grand Duchy of Lithuania (1470–1521)

- Grand Chancellor of Lithuania
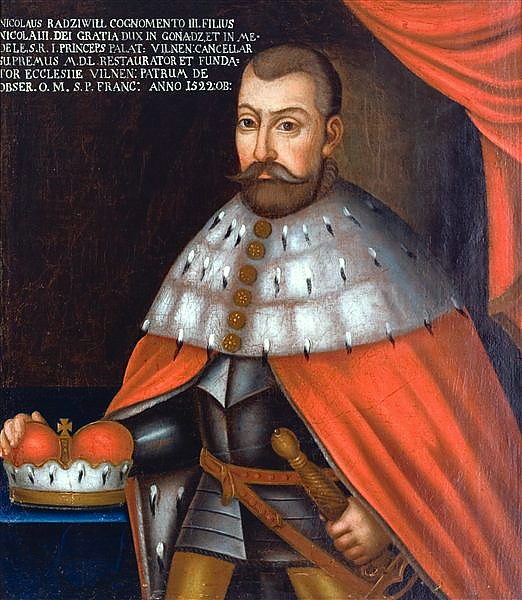
- Born: 1470
- Died: 1521 (aged 50–51)
- Noble family: Radziwiłł
- Spouse: Elźbieta Sakowicz h. Pomian
- Issue: with Elźbieta Sakowicz: Mikołaj Radziwiłł; Jan Radziwiłł; Zofia Zabrzeziński; Stanisław Radziwiłł; Helena, Princess Jerzy Olelkowicz Słucki; Elżbieta, Princess Iwan Dubrownicki Holszański
- Father: Mikalojus Radvila the Old
- Mother: Sofija Ona Manvydaitė

Mikołaj II Radziwiłł (Belarusian: Мікалай Радзівіл, Lithuanian: Mikalojus Radvila) (1470–1521), nicknamed Amor Poloniae, was a magnate and statesman of the Grand Duchy of Lithuania.

He obtained the title of prince from Emperor Maximilian I. He was a son of Mikalojus Radvilaitis and among the first Radziwiłłs to carry this family name. He had brothers Jerzy Radziwiłł, Jan Radziwiłł and Wojciech Radziwiłł and sister Anna Radziwiłł. Mikołaj was a progenitor of Goniądz–Miadzyel Radziwiłł family line. He inherited the lands of Musninkai and Kėdainiai. Most of his acquired fortune had been confiscated from Michael Glinski—notably Rajgród, Goniądz and Knyszyn.

He took part in the second Muscovite–Lithuanian War of 1500–03 and other raids under leadership of Konstanty Ostrogski. Mikołaj was the Podczaszy from 1505 until 1510, Voivode of Vilnius from 1507 and replaced his father as the Grand Chancellor of Lithuania from 1510. On 6 March [O.S. 25 February] 1481 received, as the first member of the family, the princely title from the emperor Maximilian I, as Reichsfürst ("Imperial Prince") of Goniądz and Myadzyel.

Due to his pro-Polish views and arid support for the Polish–Lithuanian Union he was nicknamed Amor Poloniae by his contemporaries. He rivaled Albertas Goštautas for influence in the government of the Grand Duchy of Lithuania and was the initial editor of the First Statute of Lithuania.

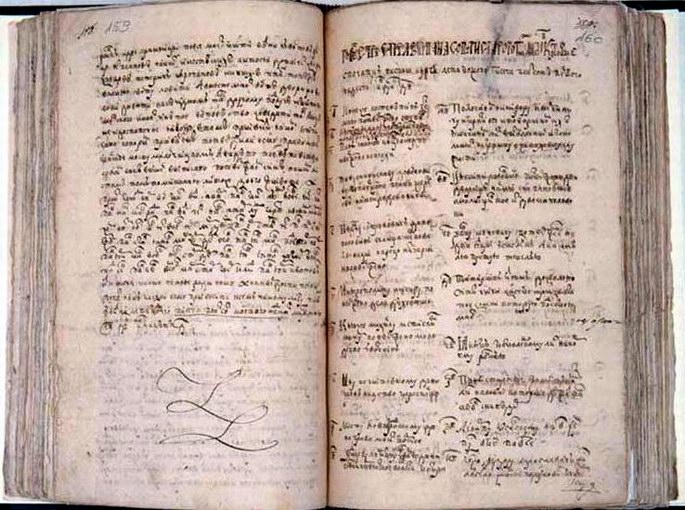
A Lithuanian Metrica of 1511–18, from the chancellery of Lithuanian Grand Chancellor Mikołaj Radziwiłł

== Marriage and issue ==
Mikołaj married Elźbieta Anna Sakowicz h. Pomian (daughter of the boyar Bohdan Sakowicz, who was adopted by the Pomian clan) their children were:

- Mikołaj Radziwiłł, Bishop of Samogitia
- Jan Radziwiłł; married Anna Kostewicz h. Leliwa
- Zofia Radziwiłł; married Jan Zabrzeziński h. Leliwa
- Stanisław Radziwiłł; married Magdalena Boner h. Boner in 1527 in Kraków
- Helena Radziwiłł; married Prince Jerzy Olelkowicz Słucki
- Elżbieta Radziwiłł; married Prince Iwan Dubrownicki Holszański
