= Joachim Chreptowicz =

Polish-Lithuanian nobleman, writer and politician

Joachim Litawor Chreptowicz
- Grand Chancellor of Lithuania
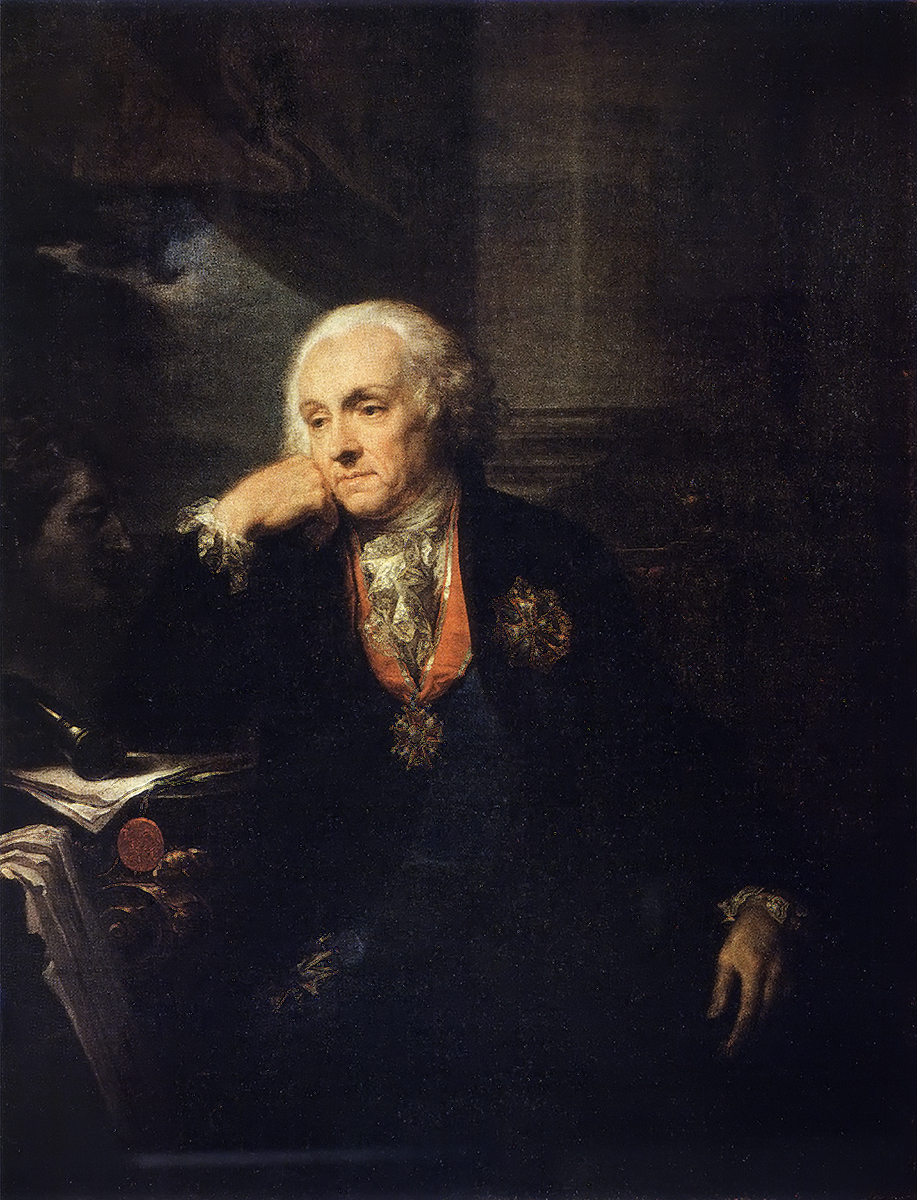
- Portrait by Josef Grassi, 1795
- Coat of arms: Odrowąż
- Born: 4 January 1729; Jasieniec near Novogrudok, Grand Duchy of Lithuania
- Died: 4 March 1812 (aged 83); Warsaw, Duchy of Warsaw
- Father: Marcjan Chreptowicz
- Mother: Regina Wojnianka

Joachim Litawor Chreptowicz (Belarusian: Іахім (Яўхім) Літавор Храптовіч; Lithuanian: Jokimas Liutauras Chreptavičius; 4 January 1729 – 4 March 1812), of Odrowąż Coat of Arms, was a Polish-Lithuanian nobleman, writer, poet, politician of the Grand Duchy of Lithuania, marshal of the Lithuanian Tribunal, and the last Grand Chancellor of Lithuania. He was a member of the Permanent Council, activist of the Commission of National Education, physiocrat and a vivid supporter of the Targowica Confederation. He also founded the library of the Counts of Chreptowicz in Szczorsy (now in Belarus), which was augmented by his son and contained over 10,000 volumes, including valuable collections of Polish histories from the 16th to 18th centuries.

Chreptowicz was also known in Polish apicultural circles. He expressed what were then new ideas, such as the idea that the queen bee is the only fertile female in a bee colony, that worker bees are infertile females, and that drone bees are male.

== Works ==
- Réponse de la part du Roi aux Députés de la Délégation prononcée par... le 16 févier 1774
- "Zdanie JW. JP. ... na projekt pod tytułem: Powinności i władza departamentów w Radzie, na sesji sejmowej w r. 1776 d. 23 września dane", brak miejsca i roku wydania; także Warszawa 1776 (tu nieco inaczej sformułowano końcową część tytułu: ... na sesji sejmowej dnia 23 września 1776 miane)
- Poezja, wyd. w: I. Krasicki "Zbiór potrzebniejszych wiadomości", Warszawa 1781 i wyd. następne, (artykuł)
- Odpowiedź tegoż, powst. 1787, wyd. w: F. Karpiński Dzieła wierszem i prozą, t. 1, Warszawa 1806, s. 348-350; odpowiedź na list poetycki F. Karpińskiego pt. "List do J. L. C. P. W. Ks. L. (Joachima Litawora Chreptowicza Pisarza Wielkiego Księstwa Litewskiego) z Krasnegostawu; Karpiński napisał w 1787 roku 2 kolejne listy poetyckie do Chreptowicza, ogł. w: Dzieła..., s. 346-348, 350-354
- Głos JW. Jmci Pana... na sesji sejmowej dnia 18 grudnia r. 1789
- Odezwa do publiczności, brak miejsca wydania (1794)
- Reprodukcja coroczna krajowa, powst. około roku 1801, wyd. w książce: J. Turgot O składaniu się i podzielaniu majątków w społeczności, tłum. S. Kłokocki, Warszawa 1802
- O prawie natury, pismo oryginalne jednego z współziomków, wyd. S. K. (Kłokocki), Warszawa 1814
- Na obraz Rafaela. Wiersz łaciński (informacja G. Korbuta)
- Magazyn Warszawski (tu: "List do edytora" 1785, t. 1, cz. 1; "Wiadomość względem użytecznego i trwałego poprawiania łąk" 1785, t. 1, cz. 2), Pamiętnik Warszawski (1809-1810).

== Bibliography ==
- Historia Dyplomacji Polskiej – tom II 1572-1795, PWN, Warszawa 1981, s. 525
- Krzysztof Tracki, Problem reformy miejskiej w ideach i działalności politycznej podkanclerzego litewskiego Joachima Chreptowicza (w okresie Sejmu Czteroletniego)
- G. Ryżewski, Ród Chreptowiczów herbu Odrowąż, Kraków 2006
- T. 4: Oświecenie. W: Bibliografia Literatury Polskiej – Nowy Korbut. Warszawa: Państwowy Instytut Wydawniczy, 1966, s. 354-357.
