= Battle of Ashmyany =

1432 battle of the Lithuanian Civil War (1432–1438)

Coordinates: 54°27′00″N 25°54′00″E

- Part of the Lithuanian Civil War (1432–1438)
Date	8 December 1432
Location	Ashmyany
Result	Sigismund Kęstutaitis' victory

Belligerents
Švitrigaila's forces Russians; Tatars	Sigismund's forces Samogitians; Masurians

Commanders and leaders
Švitrigaila; Jurgis Gedgaudas; Jurgis Lengvenaitis	Sigismund Kęstutaitis

Strength
Several thousand	20,000

Casualties and losses
10,000 killed 4,000 captured	Heavy

The Battle of Ashmyany or Ašmena (Lithuanian: Ašmenos mūšis) was fought on 8 December 1432 at Ashmyany between the armies of Švitrigaila and Sigismund Kęstutaitis, two pretenders to the throne of the Grand Duchy of Lithuania during the Lithuanian Civil War (1432–1438).

== Battle ==
Švitrigaila with several thousand troops (estimated to total about 40,000) marched out of Polatsk, where he was staying, and took Minsk, Kreva, Ashmyany, and was preparing to attack Vilnius. Sigismund Kęstutaitis' Lithuanian and Samogitia army supported by Masurians from Drahichyn (estimated to total about 20,000) attacked Švitrigaila's Lithuanian and Russian troops supported by Tatars, led by Khan Sayid Ahmad I. Švitrigaila's Livonian Order allies did not arrive in time for the battle.

The battle lasted from morning until evening. At first, Sigismund's army was pushed by Švitrigaila's forces about 3 miles (4.8 km) towards Vilna, but Sigismund Kęstutaitis towards the evening beat and struck back at Švitrigailos forces. Both sides suffered heavy losses. According to the Polish chronicler Jan Długosz, about 10,000 of Švitrigaila's men were killed and 4,000 were captured. Švitrigaila escaped to Polatsk. The former voivode of Vilnius Jonas Manvydas, Jurgis Lengvenaitis ruler of Mstsislaw, Duke Jurgis Gedgaudas and other commanders of his army were taken into captivity.

== Aftermath ==
Although Sigismund Kęstutaitis won the battle, his army was also weakened and so he could not pursue Švitrigaila and end the civil war. The Lithuanian Civil War (1431–1435) ended with the 1435 Battle of Wilkomierz during which Švitrigaila's army was dealt a final defeat.
