= Stanislovas Čiupurna =

Lithuanian noble (died 1411)

- Stanisław Czupurna

Grand Marshal of the Grand Duchy of Lithuania
- In office 1407–1411
- Monarch: Vytautas

Court Marshal of the Grand Duchy of Lithuania
- In office 1395–1407

Personal details
- Died: 1411
- Occupation: Nobleman, diplomat

Stanislovas Čiupurna (Polish: Stanisław Czupurna; died in 1411) was a Lithuanian noble, Court (1395–1407) and Grand Marshal of the Grand Duchy of Lithuania (1407–1411). As a close ally of Grand Duke Vytautas, he was one of the chief diplomats in the conflict over Samogitia with the Teutonic Knights.

== Career ==
Čiupurna was first mentioned in written sources in 1395 as a witness to a donation of land and property to Vilnius Cathedral by Grand Duke Vytautas. At the time he was already Court Marshal. In March 1398 in Hrodna, he negotiated and signed preliminary Treaty of Salynas with the Teutonic Knights.

During the conflict over Samogitia, which eventually grew into the Polish–Lithuanian–Teutonic War, he was sent on diplomatic missions to the Teutonic Knights in 1400, 1401, 1405, 1407. It appears that his relationship with the Knights was friendly as in 1403 komtur of Balga sent him spurs, a symbol of knighthood, and in 1407 Teutonic Grand Master inquired about Čiupurna's health and covered the cost of his medical treatment in Prussia.

The last mention of Čiupurna is on 23 January 1411, when he, Vytautas, and Jogaila signed a document allowing envoys of the Grand Master to travel freely.

== Family ==
Little is known about Čiupurna's early life and family background. In 1398 and 1410, he used a coat of arms that was not borrowed from the Polish heraldry. The arms recorded his name with a patronymic, but it is undecipherable. It is known that he had a brother, Vigaila, starosta of Ukmergė, but unknown whether he married or had any children.

== Properties ==
Die Littauischen Wegeberichte mention Czapornendorff between Rudamina and Šalčininkai (Theodor Hirsch identified the location with the village of Tabariškės on Merkys River). He also had an estate in Šalčininkai and funded a Catholic church there in 1410. The document of funding the church was one of the first known documents by a Lithuanian noble.

He funded a chapel in the Church of the Assumption of the Blessed Virgin Mary in Vilnius. Čiupurna also had a house within the Vilnius Castle Complex as Benedict Makrai, mediator sent by Sigismund of Luxemburg, issued a document from the house in 1413.
