= Jurgis Gedgaudas =

Lithuanian noble and diplomat (died c. 1435)

Jurgis Gedgaudas (died c. 1435) was a noble and diplomat from the Grand Duchy of Lithuania. He used the Leliwa coat of arms. He was active in political life from 1401 to 1435, serving Grand Dukes Vytautas and Švitrigaila as voivode and diplomat. His represented their interest at the Council of Constance and Teutonic Order. He was one of the few nobles who continued to support Švitrigaila after he was deposed. However, after being captured in the Battle of Ashmyany, he switched sides and supported Sigismund Kęstutaitis managing to retain his social status.

== Political career ==
Gedgaudas was first mentioned in 1401 when he witnessed the Union of Vilnius. At the time he was duke's marshal. Sometime later he probably became Voivode of Kiev. He lost this position in 1411 to become the elder of Podolia (predecessor of the Voivode of Podolia). King Jogaila sent him and several Polish nobles to Hungary in 1411 and Grand Duke Vytautas sent him to the Council of Constance in 1416. Traveler Guillebert de Lannoy was received by Gedgaudas in 1421. After the death of his brother Albertas Manvydas, Voivode of Vilnius, in 1423, Gedgaudas became the Voivode of Vilnius until the 1432 coup against Švitrigaila. Gedgaudas was sent on a diplomatic mission to the Kingdom of Poland in 1429.

After the death of Vytautas, he supported Grand Duke Švitrigaila and represented him in negotiations with Poland 1431 and 1432 and with the Teutonic Order in 1432 (see Lithuanian Civil War (1432–1438) for political background). Gedvilas was of nine Lithuanian noble witnesses of the Treaty of Christmemel (June 1431) and was at Švitrigaila's side when he was deposed in a coup on 1 August 1432. He was one of the few Lithuanian nobles supporting Švitrigaila after the coup. He was one of the commanders of the Battle of Ashmyany (December 1432) and was taken prisoner. He switched sides to support Sigismund Kęstutaitis and was able to retain his wealth and influence (his son even received Mir from Sigismund in 1434). In May 1434, Gedgaudas witnessed Sigismund's privilege to Catholic and Eastern Orthodox nobility though at that time he did not hold any posts.

== Origin and family ==
Gedgaudas is his pagan Lithuanian name; Jurgis (George) is his baptismal name after the conversion of Lithuania in 1387. His origin is unknown; his father's name is known only from his patronymic name. He was a brother of Albertas Manvydas. His patrimony was around Kernavė and Ashmyany with the principal estate in Vishnyeva. Die Littauischen Wegeberichte mentioned Manewidendorf near Hieraniony which likely belonged to the family.

In September 1442, his widow Anastasia, possibly a daughter of Jurgis Taločka, donated to the Chapel of St. Albert and St. George of Vilnius Cathedral that was established by his brother Albertas Manvydas and where Gedgaudas was buried (note that brothers' baptismal names were Albert and George). Only one son of Gedgaudas is known. Petras Simonas Gedgaudas (died in 1451 without leaving children) was regent of Polotsk (1440) and Smolensk (1447–1451).

== Bibliography ==
- Frost, Robert (2015). The Making of the Polish-Lithuanian Union 1385-1569. Oxford History of Early Modern Europe. Vol. I. Oxford University Press. ISBN 9780191017872.
- Kirkienė, Genutė (2008). LDK politikos elito galingieji: Chodkevičiai XV–XVI amžiuje (in Lithuanian). Vilniaus universiteto leidykla. ISBN 978-9955-33-359-3.
- Petrauskas, Rimvydas (2000). "Vytauto laikų didikų kilmė". Lituanistica (in Lithuanian). 1/2 (41/42). ISSN 2424-4716.
- Petrauskas, Rimvydas (2003). Lietuvos diduomenė XIV a. pabaigoje – XV a. (in Lithuanian). Aidai. ISBN 9955-445-67-X.
- Petrauskas, Rimvydas (2011). "Gedgaudai". In Manelis, Eugenijus; Račis, Antanas (eds.). Lietuvos istorija. Enciklopedinis žinynas (in Lithuanian). Vol. I. Mokslo ir enciklopedijų leidybos centras. ISBN 978-5-420-01689-3.
