= Anna Radziwiłłówna Kiszczyna =

Polish noblewoman (died 1600)

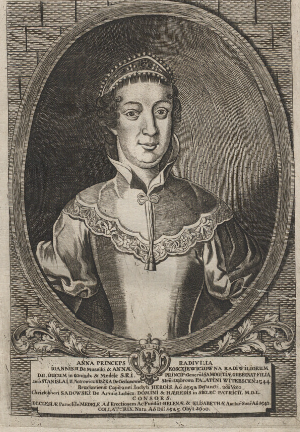
Anna Radziwiłłówna Kiszczyna

Anna Radziwiłłówna Kiszczyna Sadowska (died 1600) was a Polish magnate, reformer and writer.

She was the daughter of Jan Radziwiłł and Anna Kostewiczówna and married to Stanisław Kiszka (d. 1554) in 1552 and Kristopher Sadowski in 1574. She was a Calvinist who introduced the Protestant Reformation in her lands. In, 1563, she became a follower and supporter of the Polish Brethren. She wrote several religious works.
