= Grand Chancellor of Lithuania =

- State Coat of arms
- Appointer: Grand Duke of Lithuania
- Precursor: Chancellor of Lithuania
- Formation: 15th century
- First holder: Sudivojus Valimantaitis
- Final holder: Joachim Chreptowicz
- Abolished: 1795

The Grand Chancellor of Lithuania (Belarusian: Канцлер вялікі літоўскі; Lithuanian: Lietuvos didysis kancleris; Polish: Kanclerz wielki litewski) was one of the highest offices in the Grand Duchy of Lithuania. The office functioned from the middle of the 15th century until the end of the real union with the Kingdom of Poland in 1795 and its subsequent partition among Prussia, Russia and Austria. The chancellor possessed the Great Seal of Lithuania and had the Lithuanian Metrica at his disposal.

== History ==
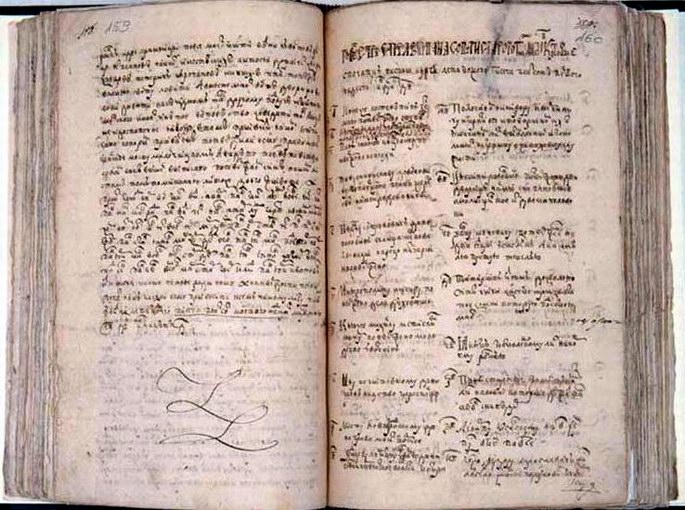
A Lithuanian Metrica of 1511–18, from the chancellery of Lithuanian Grand Chancellor Mikołaj Radziwiłł, written in Ruthenian.

It is thought that the role of chancellor originated from court positions of the manor of the Grand Duke of Lithuania. Although the role of a state chancellor existed since the times of Grand Duke Vytautas, it formally appeared during the reign of Casimir IV Jagiellon. The expanding territory of the Grand Duchy of Lithuania and the increasing value of land, property as well as judicial institutions meant an increased need for written documents. The needs of Vytautas's political diplomacy with the Grand Duchy of Moscow, Byzantine Empire and tatars were met with the creation of two chancelleries - the first of which would prepare documents in Latin and German, while the second would prepare documents in Russian. Eleven scribes worked in those offices, some of whom were sent by Vytautas's cousin and king of Poland, Jogaila, from his estate in Poland (Mikalojus Cebulka and Mikalojus Maldrzykas are examples of such scribes). It is known that three scribes came from the Teutonic Order. Scribes from Volhynia were given the task of assisting in writing Ruthenian, although it is believed that some Ruthenian documents were prepared by Lithuanians. Up until the Union of Lublin the role of the Grand Chancellor would be the second highest next to the Grand Duke since he would usually reside in Poland and consequently Grand Chancellor oversaw most of the Grand Duchy's politics as well as the Lithuanian Council of Lords.

Since official roles weren't yet formalized, the scribe's office would be categorized as either a simple scribe or the secretary of the Grand Duke. During the reign of Casimir IV Jagiellon, the chancellery would be fully established. Its first grand chancellor was Sudivojus Valimantaitis. During the reign of Alexander Jagiellon, the chancellery became the center of the politics of the Grand Duchy. Offices became categorized into treasury-related matters and diplomacy-related matters. The Grand Chancellor would usually be a member of a noble magnate family, such as the Radziwill, Sapieha, Gasztowt families. Up until the creation of the Lithuanian Tribunal in 1581, the Grand Chancellor led the Grand Duchy's Supreme Court. In the 16th century, the number of scribes as well as literacy itself increased; tariffs and taxes would be more frequently and effectively checked within the country's territory. The Grand Chancellor would usually have a second role of being the Voivode of Vilnius as well as the Castellan of Vilnius, although this practice would later be abandoned. Until the creation of the Permanent Council, the Grand Chancellor would oversee relations with the Russian Empire.

Today the office of the chancellor has been replaced by that of the Prime Minister of Lithuania.

== List of Grand Chancellors ==
Portrait	Name	Birth	Term	Death
	Sudivojus Valimantaitis		1441–1444	
	Mykolas Kęsgaila		1444–1476	1476
	Alekna Sudimantaitis		1478–1490	1490
	Mikalojus Radvila the Old	1450	1492–1509	16 July 1509
	Mikołaj II Radziwiłł	1470	1510–1529	1529
	Albertas Goštautas	1480	1522–1539	1539
	Jonas Glebavičius		1546–1549	
	Mikołaj "the Black" Radziwiłł	4 February 1515	1550–1565	28 May 1565
	Mikołaj Radziwiłł VI	1512	1565–1584	27 April 1584
	Lew Sapieha	4 April 1557	1589–1623	7 July 1633
	Albrycht Stanisław Radziwiłł	1 July 1595	1623–1656	12 November 1656
	Krzysztof Zygmunt Pac	1621	1658–1684	1684
	Marcjan Aleksander Ogiński	1632	1684–1690	5 January 1690
	Dominik Mikołaj Radziwiłł	1643	1690–1697	1697
	Karol Radziwiłł	1668	1698–1719	1719
	Michał Serwacy Wiśniowiecki	13 May 1680	1720–1735	18 September 1744
	Jan Fryderyk Sapieha	1680	1635–1651	1651
	Michał Fryderyk Czartoryski	1696	1752–1755	1775
	Aleksander Michał Sapieha	1730	1755–1793	1793
	Joachim Chreptowicz	4 January 1729	1793–1795	4 March 1812

Source supporting the list.

== See also ==
- Polish–Lithuanian Commonwealth
- Chancellor of Poland
- Offices in the Polish–Lithuanian Commonwealth
