= Lithuanian Metrica =

Lithuanian collection of documents

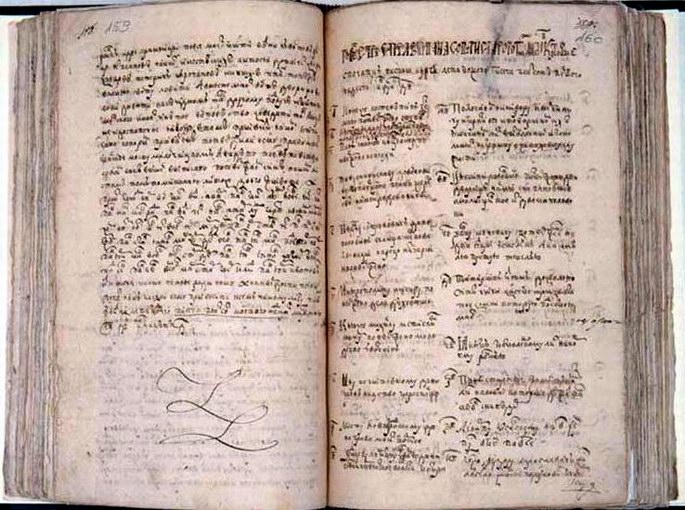
A Lithuanian Metrica of 1511–18, from the chancellery of Lithuanian Grand Chancellor Mikołaj Radziwiłł, written in Ruthenian.

The Lithuanian Metrica or the Metrica of the Grand Duchy of Lithuania (Latin: Acta Magni Ducatus Lithuaniae, Lithuanian: Lietuvos Metrika, or Lietuvos didžiosios kunigaikštystės metrika; Polish: Metryka Litewska, or Metryka Wielkiego Księstwa Litewskiego; Belarusian: Літоўская Метрыка, Ukrainian: Литовська метрика) is a collection of the 14–18th-century legal documents of the Chancellery of the Grand Duchy of Lithuania (GDL). Maintained systematically since the 2nd half of the 15th century, metrica consisted, initially and primarily, of the copies of the documents issued by the Grand Duke, Lithuanian Council of Lords, and Seimas.

The Metrica also included some important externally originated documents (like translations of the issues (yarlyks) of the Crimea Khans, copies of the Muscovy diplomatic documents etc.), the office-keeping documental materials (like registers of acts, inventories of the Metrica itself etc.) The selection of the classes of the documents included in the Metrica had increased since the 2nd half 15th – 16th century and even more so in the 17–18th centuries, extending to include the copies of transcripts of diplomatic correspondence, charters of privileges, wills, verdicts, judicial decrees, even certain kinds of private correspondence, e.g., received by the official persons. Sometimes, the external and thematically not quite related collections of the documents had also been referred to as the part of the Metrica, the word Metrica here to be understood as the State Archive. The documents of the Metrica were to be preserved interminably.

Effectively, the Metrica had become the core of the Archive of the Grand Duke, later the core of the Main State Archive of the GDL, serving the notifying (judicial-registrative), judicial, referential functions. It had been the source of the authoritative official documents (copies of copies). The Metrica developed parallel to and on the model of the Crown Metrica of Poland.

Today, over 600 (estimated) books of the Lithuanian Metrica still exist. Their microfilms are preserved at the Lithuanian State Historical Archives in Vilnius.

== Names ==
The word metrica generates from Polish: metryka for archive, from Latin: matricula for office book.

The first historical names of the collection were metrics, books of metrica, metrica. Since the end of the 16th – beginning of the 17th century, the full official name was Metrica of the Grand Duchy of Lithuania. This would be the most appropriate scientific name. The dub Lithuanian Metrica had been occasionally used in the local office books (by analogy with the Crown Metrica of Poland), since the mid-17th century the dub had consolidated its position in the documents of the Warsaw Archives, later in the Archives of Moscow and St. Petersburg, then in the 19–20th centuries Russian, Polish, Belarusian, Lithuanian historiographies. The name Lithuanian Metrica is till now traditionally used in the Western publications of the Metrica. The name Lithuanian Metrica is also used in reference to some contemporary archival collections, including some of the materials of the Chancellery of the GDL (together with other unrelated materials), chiefly in Russia custody.

== Languages ==
The prevailing language of the documents of the 15th and most of the 16th century Metrica had been the Ruthenian language. Alternatively, the prevailing use of the Ruthenian language in the Metrica is extended up to the mid-17th century. The documents, concerned with the Western Europe, had been issued in Latin, occasionally in German. The documents, concerned with the Roman Catholic Church, had been issued in Latin. See also naming of the Ruthenian language.

Since the late 16th – early 17th century, the number of the documents composed in Polish and in Latin, had been steadily increasing, until the complete elimination of the Ruthenian from the office use in the GDL, and further official ban on the Ruthenian for the official use (1696). The language of the 17–18th century Metrica is mostly Polish and partly Latin.

== History ==
State archives were begun in the 13th-century Kingdom of Lithuania. Diplomacy greatly increased under the rule of Gediminas. During the various wars, floods, and city fires that followed, many official documents were lost. Some were impossible to trace unless they had been duplicated or otherwise copied. A growing need to reproduce these documents later, and the mounting number of edicts, wills, court verdicts etc., determined the evolution of the Lithuanian Metrica.

The Lithuanian Metrica was stored in the Trakai Island Castle under the supervision of the Treasurer, until 1511. Afterwards the documents were transferred to Vilnius, and kept in what was referred to as the Lower Castle. The responsibility for safeguarding the Metrica there, was supervised by the State Chancellor. By 1569, when the regions of Podlasie, Volhynia, Podolia and the Kiev were separated from Grand Duchy of Lithuania and incorporated into the Crown of the Kingdom of Poland, the books which concerned these regions were removed from the Lithuanian Metrica, and merged into the Crown Metrica. Due to the deterioration of the books, State Grand Chancellor Lew Sapieha, ordered the volumes of the Metrica to be recopied in 1594. The recopying process continued until 1607. The newly recopied books were inventoried, rechecked, and transferred to a separate building in Vilnius, with the older books remaining in the Castle of Vilnius.

Great parts of the Metrica were lost during the wars with Muscovy, and others were taken way by Swedish armies in 1656–1657. Only after the Treaty of Oliva (1660), did the Swedes return many books from the Metrica, but some of them were lost at sea, in the Baltic, during transport back to Lithuania.

The Metrica from Vilnius was taken to Warsaw in 1765. The books were bound, cataloged and integrated into the system that was in use in Warsaw. According to an edict issued in 1793, the Lithuanian Metrica was to be transferred from Warsaw to Vilnius again. After the Third Partition of Poland (1795), the Lithuanian Metrica was transferred from Warsaw to Russia as a war trophy and was kept in Saint Petersburg. Russia gave several of the Lithuanian Metrica books to Prussia in 1799. Afterwards Prussia transferred these books to the Duchy of Warsaw in 1807. The remaining Lithuanian Metrica books in St. Petersburg were inventoried and taken to Moscow. The majority of the historical Lithuanian Metrica's books have been kept in Russia, and today only a small fraction of them are in Lithuania.

The remaining part of the Lithuanian Metrica is kept in Poland, at the Central Archives of Historical Records in Warsaw.

== Publications ==
The Metrica is one of the most authoritative and revered sources on the history of the GDL. Some of the documents of the Metrica and parts of them had begun to be published in the end 18th century. Larger collections of the materials had begun to be published since 1830s («Digest of Prince Obolyenskiy», altern. «Ambassador’s Book of the Metrica...», in 3 volumes, includes detailed register of the books of the Metrica by Anastasyevich (1817)). Other notable publishers of the Metrica materials had been Lyeontovich, Prohaska, Bershadskiy and others. Other notable publications of the period:

- Acts of the Lithuanian Metrica (Акты Литовской метрики, т. 1, в. 1 – 2, Варшава, 1896–1897).
- Acts of the Western Russia (Акты Западной России, full name: Акты, относящиеся к истории Западной России, собранные и изданные Археографическою комиссиею. – СПб., 1846–1853).

Consists of about two thousand official documents (not all of them belonging to the Metrica proper), published in five volumes, covering the period of 1340–1699 (I: 1340–1506, II: 1506–1544, III: 1544–1587, IV: 1588–1632, V: 1633–1699).

- Acts of the Southern and Western Russia (Акты Южной и Западной России, full name: Акты, относящиеся к истории Южной и Западной России, собранные и изданные Археографическою комиссиею, т.1-15 – СПб., 1861–1892).

Consists of the official documents (not all of them belonging to the Metrica proper), published in fifteen volumes, covering the period of 1361–1678. Thematically, concentrates on the 17th century. Ukrainian wars and on 16–17th century Russian–Commonwealth wars. Does not include originally Polish and Latin documents.

- Russian historical library, V. 20, 27, 30, 33 (Русская историческая библиотека, т. 20, 27, 30, 33, Спб. – П., 1903–1915).
- Acts of the Lithuanian-Russian state (Акты Литовско-Русского государcтва, в. 1 – т.2, М., 1897–1899).

Consists of the documents, mainly of the Metrica, covering the 14–16th centuries, published by Dovnar-Zapol’skiy.

- Malinovskiy. Digest of the materials related to the history of noble council of the Grand Duchy of Lithuania (Малиновский И. Сборник материалов, относящихся к истории панов-рады Великого Княжества Литовского, [ч. 1 – 2], Томск, 1901–1912).

In 1980s–1990s there had begun a new wave of the publishing of the Metrica materials, this time as an international, Belarusian–Lithuanian–Polish–Russian effort.

The Metrica had served as a basis for the works of the notable researchers of the GDL history, e.g., Lyubavskiy, Dovnar-Zapol’skiy, Maksimeyka, Lappo, Pichyeta, Malinovskiy, Lawmyanski and others.

The scientific research of the Metrica itself had begun with the work of Ptaszycki (1887). Other notable researchers of the Metrica: Byeryezhkov, Grimstead, Sułkowska-Kurasiowa.
