= Alekna Sudimantaitis =

Grand Chancellor of Lithuania, Voivode of Vilnius

Alekna Sudimantaitis (Belarusian: Алехна Судзімонтавіч, Polish: Olechno Sudymuntowicz; died in 1490/1491) was an influential Lithuanian noble of Trąby coat of arms, Grand Chancellor of the Grand Duchy of Lithuania (1478–1490) and Voivode of Vilnius (1477–1490).

Alekna is mentioned in written sources in 1446. He was royal cup-bearer (cześnik, 1448–1477) and chamberlain (podkomorzy; 1449–1453). According to the Bychowiec Chronicle, Alekna led a Lithuanian squad in the 1454 Battle of Chojnice. During the battle Alekna was taken captive by the Teutonic Knights. He was also starosta of Hrodna (1458–1459) and regent of Polatsk (1463–1477). After the death of Mykolas Kęsgaila in 1476, Alekna became Grand Chancellor and Voivode of Vilnius. He held those positions until his death in 1490 or 1491; the positions were taken over by Alekna's relative Mikalojus Radvila the Old. In 1482, a brevis from Pope Sixtus IV to launch a new crusade against the Ottoman Turks was addressed to Alekna and Martynas Goštautas, Voivode of Trakai.

He considered Hozhevo (Belarusian: Хожево) near Maladzyechna and Ratomas near Minsk as his patrimony. He also held territories near Hrodna and in Tureysk (Russian: Турейск). Through his wife, Alekna inherited Dokshytsy. From Grand Duke Casimir, Alekna received Smalyavichy, Voŭpa, Ostroshitsy (Belarusian: Астрошыцы). He funded an altar inside a chapel of Vilnius Castle Complex, where his wife Jadvyga was buried. It is likely that he was buried there as well.

== Family ==
Biased works of Jan Długosz claimed that Alekna was of "humble lot," when in fact Alekna hailed from an established noble family. He was a son of Sudimantas Dargaitis and second cousin of Mikalojus Radvila the Old (see family tree in Astikai). He married ca. 1454 Jadvyga, daughter of Jonas Manvydas. They had five daughters:

- Sophia, wife of Alexander Olshanski
- Jadviga, wife of Jonas Kontautaitis, and later Stanislovas Mantautas
- Anna, a Franciscian (Bernardine) nun
- Dorota, a Franciscian (Bernardine) nun
- Świętochna (Swyentocha), a Franciscian (Bernardine) nun

Before 1465 Alekna married for the second time, this time to a Polish woman, Jadwiga Trzecieska, they had three children:

- Alexandra, wife of Mikołaj Tęczyński
- Jadwiga, wife of Stanislovas Kęsgaila
- Adam, died in a young age

== Notes ==
1.For a long time, there was belief that Jadwiga, born of Jadvyga Manvydas, married three times to Jonas Kontautaitis, Stanislovas Mantautas, and Stanislovas Kęsgaila. At the same time, an unknown daughter by name was mentioned, who was also the wife of Stanislovas Kęsgaila. In fact, Alekna Sudimantaitis had two daughters named Jadwiga, born from two different mothers.
2. The fact of Alekna Sudimantaitis' two marriages was established by Janusz Kurtyka. In view of this, the second marriage of Alekna Sudimantaitis, and not the marriage of his daughter to Tęczynski, is therefore the first known marriage between a Lithuanian and Polish noble family.

== Bibliography ==
- Wróbel, Wiesław (2013). "Krąg rodzinny Zofii z Chożowa Holszańskiej i jej testament z 29 VII 1518 r.". Rody, rodziny Mazowsza i Podlasia. Źródła do badań genealogicznych.
