= Die Littauischen Wegeberichte =

Die Littauischen Wegeberichte (German for Lithuanian route report) is a compilation of 100 routes into the western Grand Duchy of Lithuania prepared by the Teutonic Knights in 1384–1402. The Knights waged the Lithuanian Crusade to convert pagan Lithuanians into Christianity since the 1280s. The crusade was characterized with frequent raids into the enemy territory to loot and pillage. Since Lithuania lacked a developed road network, local Lithuanian and Prussian scouts would describe and document the best and most effective routes for the military raids into Lithuania.

The reports contained brief directions using both natural (rivers, lakes, swamps, forests) and man-made (villages, nobility estates, roads, formerly inhabited places) landmarks for navigation. It also described obstacles and provided locations of good places for rest camps, where to obtain drinking water or fodder for horses. The place names were recorded in old German, therefore some of them are quite distorted from their original Lithuanian form. Also, some places or place names did not survive to the present day. Therefore, there are many issues in trying to identify and locate the named places. However, the reports are still an important source for the study of Lithuanian local history, toponymy, geographic, social, and economic aspects of the 14th-century Lithuanian society. For example, Wegeberichte mentioned several alka, i.e. sacred grooves or pagan shrines, and illustrated logistical difficulties faced by an invading army.

The scout reports were archived in the Prussian State Archive Königsberg. They were collected, organized, and first published in Scriptores Rerum Prussicarum as Die Littauischen Wegeberichte in 1863. The publisher, Theodor Hirsch, was the first to try and match place names in Wegeberichte with present-day locations. He also numbered and named the routes for easier referencing. A Lithuanian translation was prepared by Jurgis Jurginis in 1983, but it contains many inaccuracies. Several other historians studied Wegeberichte, but overall, it is not a well-researched source.
