= Mikalojus Radvila the Old =

Lithuanian noble (c. 1450 – 1509)

- Grand Chancellor of Lithuania; Voivode of Vilnius
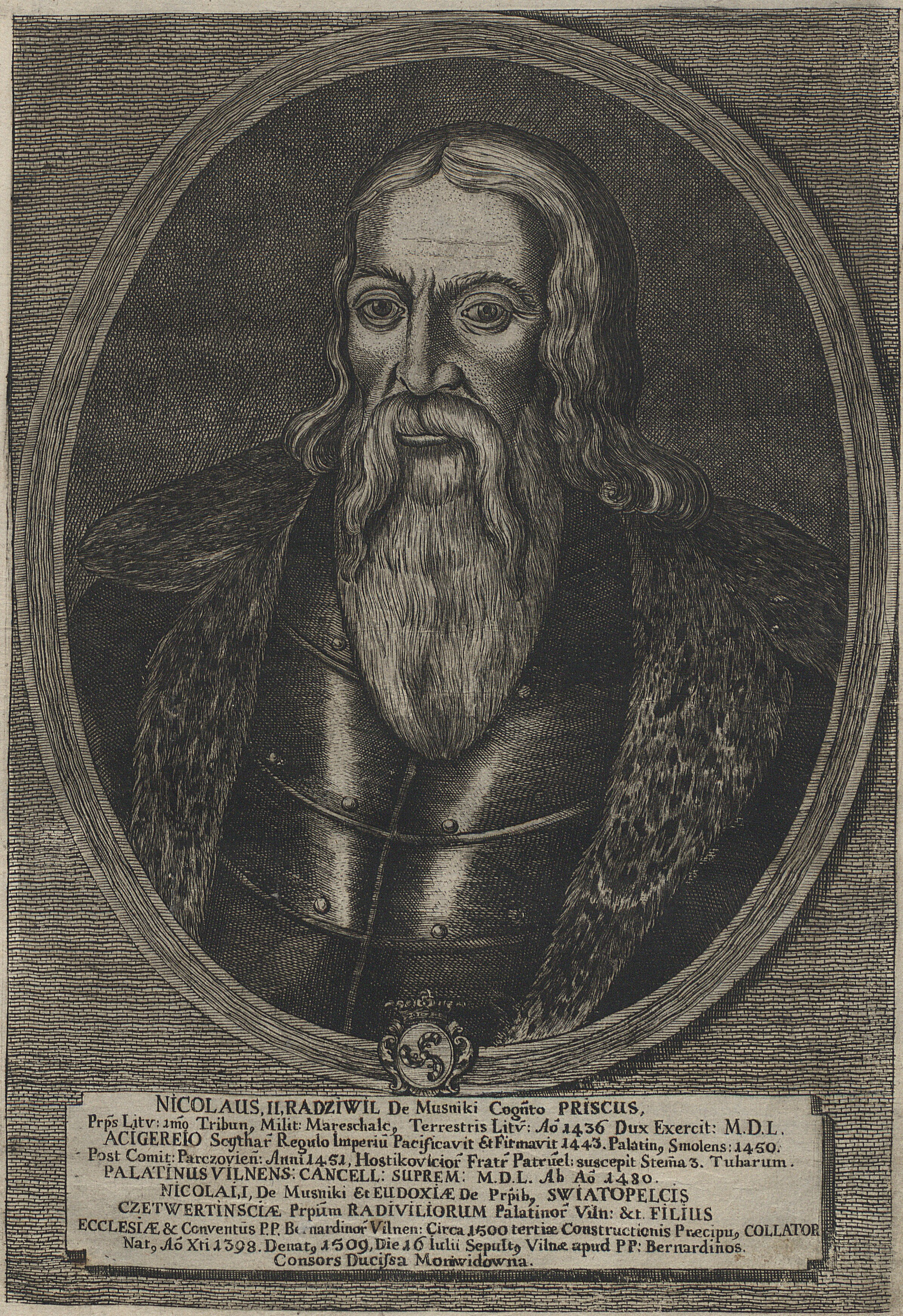
- Mikalojus Radvila the Old
- Born: c. 1450
- Died: 25 July [O.S. 16 July] 1509
- Noble family: Radziwiłł
- Spouses: Sofija Ona Manvydaitė; Zofia Zasławska; Fiedora Rohatyńska
- Issue: with Sofija Ona Manvydaitė: Mikołaj II Radziwiłł; Jan Radziwiłł; Anna Radziwiłł; Wojciech Radziwiłł; Jerzy Radziwiłł
- Father: Radvila Astikas
- Mother: Eudoxia Radziwiłł

Mikalojus Radvila the Old (Note: Belarusian: Мікалай Радзівіл Стары, Lithuanian: Mikalojus Radvilaitis, Mikalojus II Radvila Senasis, Polish: Mikołaj Radziwiłłowicz Stary, Latin: Nicolaus II Radziwil Priscus.) (c. 1450 – 25 July [O.S. 16 July] 1509) was a Lithuanian noble. He was known after a patronym Radvilaitis, made of his father's name Radvila, which in turn became a family name of his heirs, Radvilos, which later polonised as Radziwiłł.

Mikalojus had been a regent of Smolensk from 11 December [O.S. 2 December 1481] 1481; in 1483, a 10,000-strong army was summoned by him for the protection of Smolensk lands. He had been the Castellan of Trakai since 9 June [O.S. 31 May] 1488 and regent of Novogrudok, later a regent of Bielsk Podlaski. He was the Voivode of Vilnius since 1492 and the first Grand Chancellor of Lithuania from 1504 until his death in 1509. His sons Jerzy, Mikołaj, and Jan were the progenitors of the three Radziwiłł family lines. His daughter Anna was the great-grandmother of Elizabeth Báthory.

== Bibliography ==
- (in Lithuanian) Mikalojus Radvila
