= Voivode of Vilnius =

High-ranking officer in Lithuania

The Voivode of Vilnius (Lithuanian: Vilniaus vaivada, Polish: wojewoda wileński) was a high-ranking officer in the Grand Duchy of Lithuania who governed the Vilnius Voivodeship from 1413. He was considered as the most influential member of the Lithuanian Council of Lords. After the Union of Lublin in 1569, the Voivodes of Vilnius (who were senators of the Polish–Lithuanian Commonwealth) were ranked as the fourth highest, while the Castellans of Vilnius were ranked as the sixth highest officers among the Voivodeships of the Polish–Lithuanian Commonwealth. After the Third Partition of the Commonwealth, the Vilnius Voivodeship was annexed by the Russian Empire and this position was annulled.

== Elders of Vilnius ==
From	To	Voivode	Image	Remarks
1387	1389	Andrius Goštautas		
1393		Mykolas Mingaila		Castellan of Vilnius (1413–1416)
1396	1413	Albertas Manvydas		

== Voivodes of Vilnius ==
=== 15th century ===
From	To	Voivode	Image	Remarks
1413	1424	Albertas Vaitiekus Manvydas		Died holding this title
1425	1432	Jurgis Gedgaudas		Died holding this title
1432		Jaunius Valimantaitis		Died holding this title
1433	1443	Jonas Daugirdas		Died holding this title
1443	1458	Jonas Goštautas		Died holding this title
1458		Jonas Manvydas		Died holding this title
1458	1476	Mykolas Kęsgaila		Died holding this title
1477	1491	Alekna Sudimantaitis		Died holding this title
1492	1509	Mikalojus Radvilaitis		Died holding this title

=== 16th century ===
From	To	Voivode	Image	Remarks
1510	1522	Mikołaj II Radziwiłł		Died holding this title
1522	1539	Albertas Goštautas		Died holding this title
1542	1549	Jan Hlebowicz		Died holding this title
1551	1565	Mikołaj "the Black" Radziwiłł		Died holding this title
1565	1584	Mikołaj "the Red" Radziwiłł		Died holding this title
1584	1603	Krzysztof "Piorun" Radziwiłł		Died holding this title

=== 17th century ===
From	To	Voivode	Image	Remarks
1604	1616	Mikołaj Krzysztof "the Orphan" Radziwiłł		Died holding this title
1616	1621	Jan Karol Chodkiewicz		Died holding this title
1623	1633	Lew Sapieha		Died holding this title
1633	1640	Krzysztof Radziwiłł		Died holding this title
1640	1642	Janusz Skumin Tyszkiewicz		Died holding this title
1642	1652	Krzysztof Chodkiewicz		Died holding this title
1653	1655	Janusz Radziwiłł		Died holding this title
1656	1665	Paweł Jan Sapieha		Died holding this title
1667	1668	Michał Kazimierz Radziwiłł		Deputy Chancellor of Lithuania
1668	1669	Jerzy Karol Hlebowicz		Died holding this title
1669	1682	Michał Kazimierz Pac		Died holding this title
1682	1703	Kazimierz Jan Sapieha		Died holding this title

=== 18th century ===
From	To	Voivode	Image	Remarks
1706	1707	Michał Serwacy Wiśniowiecki		Died holding this title
1722	1730	Ludwik Pociej		Died holding this title
1730	1733	Kazimierz Dominik Ogiński		Died holding this title
1735	1744	Michał Serwacy Wiśniowiecki		Died holding this title
1744	1762	Michał Kazimierz Radziwiłł		Died holding this title
1762	1764	Karol Stanisław Radziwiłł		First term
1764	1768	Michał Kazimierz Ogiński		Grand Lithuanian Hetman
1768	1790	Karol Stanisław Radziwiłł		Second term; died holding this title
1790	1795	Michał Hieronim Radziwiłł		The title was defunct after the Third Partition of the Commonwealth
