= Kiszka =

Kiszka is a surname. Notable people with the surname include:

- Kiszka family, an extinct Polish noble family
- Josh Kiszka, Jake Kiszka and Sam Kiszka, three brothers and members of the rock band Greta Van Fleet
- Emil Kiszka (1926–2007), Polish sprinter
- Jan Kiszka (1552–1592), politician and magnate
- Janusz Kiszka (1600–1653), Polish politician and magnate
- Lev Kiszka (1663–1728), Metropolitan of Kiev from 1714 to 1728
- Piotr Kiszka (died 1534), noble of the House of Kiszka
- Stanisław Kiszka (died 1510s), noble, diplomat and military commander

== See also ==
- Kishka (disambiguation)
