= Petras Jonaitis Mantigirdaitis =

Lithuanian noble (died after 1497)

Petras Jonaitis Mantigirdaitis (Polish: Piotr Janowicz Montygerdowicz; died after 1497) was a prominent Lithuanian noble. Grandson of Petras Mantigirdaitis, he first appeared in written sources in 1476 and reached his career high in the 1490s, when he was Voivode of Trakai (1490–97) and Grand Marshal of Lithuania (1491–97).

Chronicler Marcin Bielski described that Alexander Jagiellon was crowned and blessed as the new Grand Duke of Lithuania by the Bishop of Vilnius in 1492. Then Mantigirdaitis presented Alexander with a naked sword and a reminder that Alexander was elected to be a just ruler. In 1494, Mantigirdaitis was sent on the diplomatic mission to negotiate peace with the Grand Duchy of Moscow and marriage of Helena of Moscow to Alexander to end the First Muscovite–Lithuanian War.

Mantigirdaitis is mentioned as the first Grand Hetman of Lithuania. The Bychowiec Chronicle describes how Grand Duke Alexander visited the ailing Mantigirdaitis in Trakai and asked for his recommendations for a successor. Mantigirdaitis recommended Konstanty Ostrogski. Mantigirdaitis is also mentioned as Hetman in a surviving copy of a donation document by Grand Duke Alexander that Vytas Jankauskas dated March 1494. If the date is correct, this would indicate that the Hetman position developed during the First Muscovite–Lithuanian War (1492–94).

== Offices ==
Mantigirdaitis held the following offices:

- Starosta of Braslaw (1476–82) and Lutsk (1486–89)
- Marshal of Grand Duke (1480–82) and Volhynia (1487–89)
- Voivode of Trakai (1490–97)
- Grand Marshal of Lithuania (1491–97)
- Grand Hetman of Lithuania (1494–97)

== Family ==
There is no information available on his father, thus historians assume he died in his youth. Mantigirdaitis was married twice. His first wife was Anna, daughter of Jonas Vėževičius, regent of Smolensk. They had a son and a daughter. Their son Jonas died in the Battle of Vedrosha ending the family line. Their daughter Sophia married Stanisław Kiszka, who inherited the family's substantial wealth. Mantigirdaitis' second wife was Anna, daughter of Alexander Alšėniškis or of Fyodor Koributovich, son of Kaributas; they had no children. In 1482, Anna funded the Chapel of Holy Trinity in Vilnius Cathedral. It is likely that Mantigirdaitis funded the Catholic church in Iwye, his most important estate.
