= Siege of Smolensk (1502) =

Last major battle of the Muscovite-Lithuanian war, Lithuanian victory

- Part of the Muscovite–Lithuanian Wars
| Date | June–October 1502 |
| Location | Smolensk 54°47′N 32°03′E |
| Result | Lithuanian victory |

Belligerents
| Grand Duchy of Lithuania | Grand Duchy of Moscow |

Commanders and leaders
| Stanisław Kiszka | Dmitry Ivanovich Zhilka |

Strength
| 800 soldiers supported by townspeople and local nobility | Many |

The siege of Smolensk was an unsuccessful attempt to capture Smolensk by the forces of the Grand Duchy of Moscow in summer 1502. It was the last major military engagement during the Muscovite–Lithuanian War (1500–1503).

Smolensk, a strong and strategically important fortress, was a part of the Grand Duchy of Lithuania since 1404. Ivan III of Russia launched the second Muscovite–Lithuanian War in 1500 and Lithuanians suffered a great defeat in the Battle of Vedrosha. Stanisław Kiszka became regent of Smolensk in 1499 and ordered improvements to Smolensk Kremlin. By the time the Russian army, commanded by Ivan's son Dmitry Ivanovich Zhilka, reached Smolensk in June 1502, Smolensk was well-prepared for the siege.

The Russian army plundered Orsha and Vitebsk and attacked Smolensk with artillery. Their assault on 16 September was not only repelled but the defense grew into a counterattack. The indecisive but bloody Battle of Lake Smolino in September as well as Lithuanian reinforcements brought by Great Hetman (commander of the army) Stanislovas Kęsgaila, forced the Russians to retreat.

Peace negotiations began while the army was still at Smolensk. A six-year truce was concluded on the Feast of the Annunciation (March 25) in 1503. The Grand Duchy of Lithuania lost approximately 210,000 square kilometres (81,000 sq mi), or a third of its territory: Chernihiv, Novhorod-Siverskyi, Starodub, and lands around the upper Oka River. In recognition of his defense of Smolensk, Kiszka was promoted to Great Hetman in 1503. Ivan III succeeded in capturing Smolensk in 1514.
