= Zapyškis =

- Town
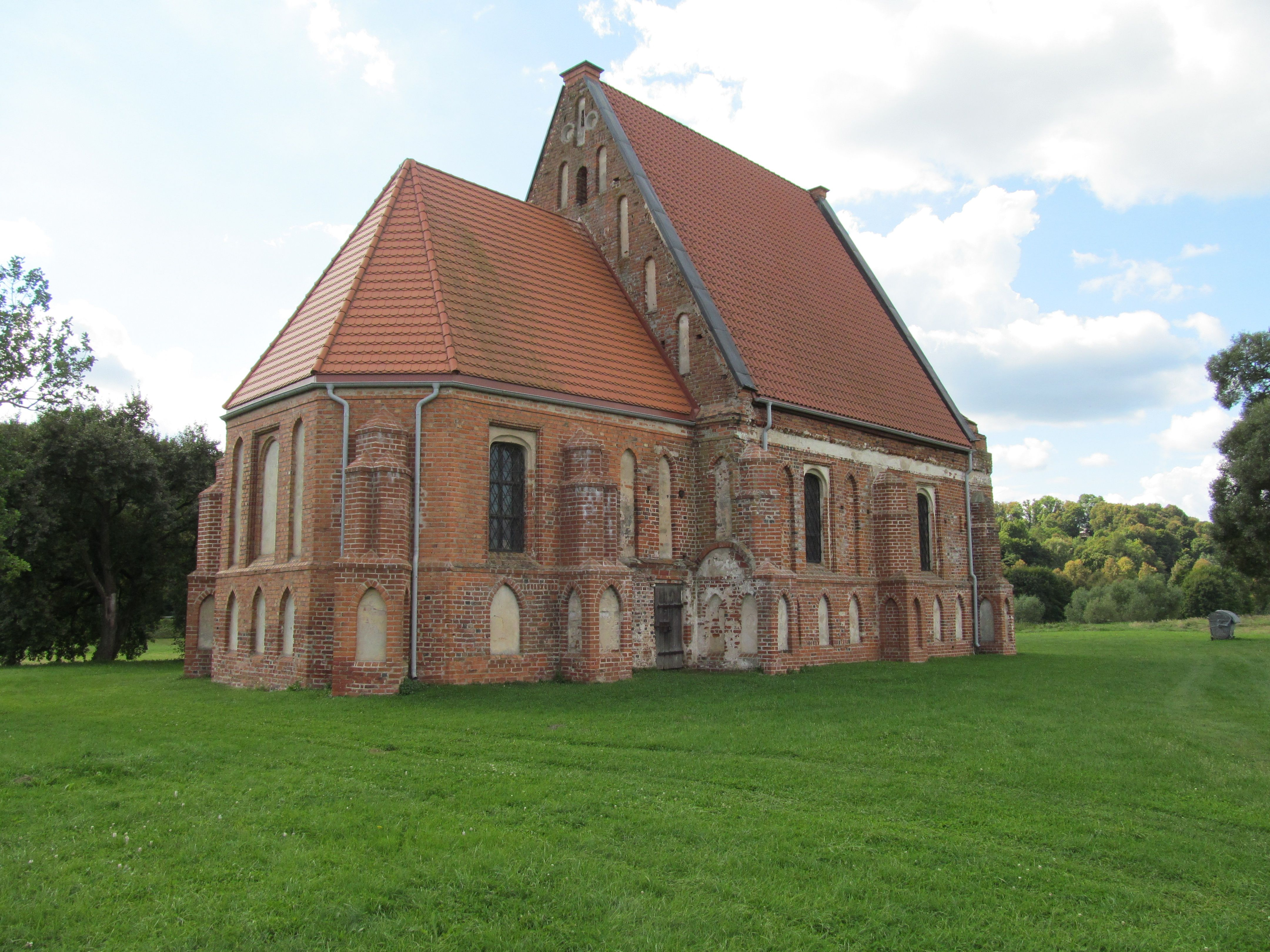
- The old church of Zapyškis

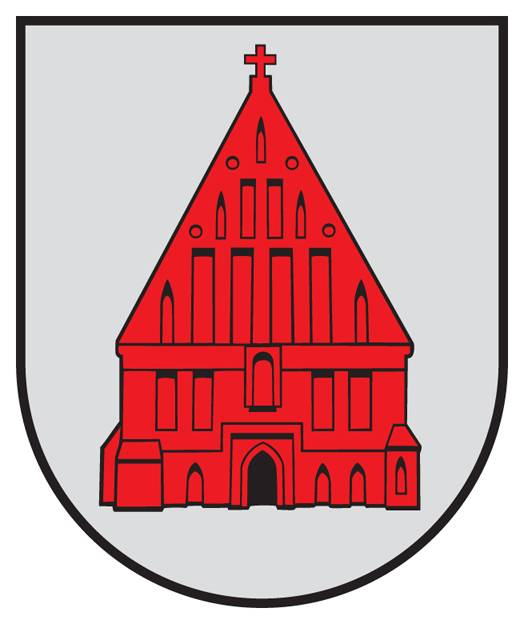
- Coat of arms

- Location in Lithuania
- Coordinates: 54°55′30″N 23°39′0″E
- Country: Lithuania
- Ethnographic region: Suvalkija
- County: Kaunas County
- Municipality: Kaunas district municipality
- Eldership: Zapyškis eldership

Population (2011)
  - Total: 264
- Time zone: UTC+2 (EET)
  - Summer (DST): UTC+3 (EEST)

Zapyškis (Polish: Sapieżyszki, Yiddish: סאַפּיזישאָק Sapizishok) is a small town in Kaunas County in central Lithuania on the left bank of the Nemunas River. As of 2011 it had a population of 264.

== History ==
The town is famous for its old early Gothic church (built between 1530 and 1578), which is depicted in town's coat of arms. A new church was built in 1942. According to tradition, the village was originally the location of one of the larger pagan temples of the Baltic tribes.

The town before 17 c. was called Panemunė, later Tarpupis and after that Sapieżyszki in Polish or Sapiegiškis in Lithuanian it is believed was named after the Sapieha family, erstwhile mighty boyars of Smolensk and later a princely family active in the Polish–Lithuanian Commonwealth. The grounds of the former pagan temple were donated to Paweł Sapieha by king of Poland Sigismund I the Old. The earlier founded a church on the ruins of the old temple and founded a new settlement there, named after himself. In the settlement, the Sapiehas also built a manor, which however did not survive to modern times.

In early 17th century Andrzej Sapieha, the voivode of Polotsk, Nowogródek and Smolensk Voivodeship, sold the village to Grzegorz Massalski, the cup-bearer of Grodno. His son, Aleksander left it to his daughter, who joined the Bernardine monastery near Kaunas. Until the partitions of Poland the monastery remained the owner of the village of Sapieżyszki. However, in 1795 the Prussian authorities secularised the convent and confiscated all of its properties. In 1812, during Napoleonic Wars, the church was partially demolished by French forces who used it as a stable. In mid-19th century the town had 564 inhabitants, many were Jewish.

On September 4, 1941, Jews of the town were murdered in a mass execution on the western outskirts of the town. An Einsatzgruppe with local Lithuanian collaborators perpetrated the mass execution. There were a few Germans with cameras at the site. According to the Jäger Report, 178 Jews were shot in Zapyškis: 47 men, 118 women and 13 children.
