= Stanislovas Kęsgaila =

Lithuanian noble (died 1527)

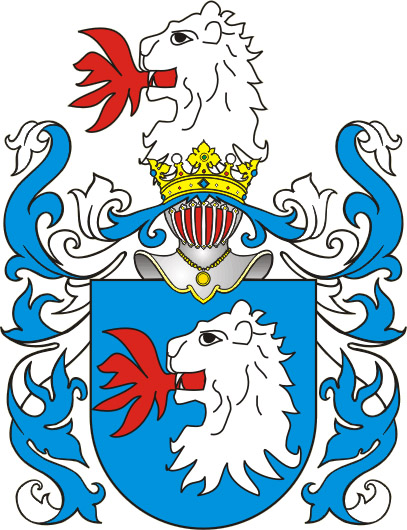
Zadora coat of arms

Stanislovas Jonavičius Kęsgaila (Polish: Stanisław Janowicz Kieżgajło; died 1527) was a Lithuanian nobleman, son of Jonas Kęsgaila from the Kęsgaila family. Stanislovas Kęsgaila was the Elder of Samogitia (1486–1522), Grand Hetman of Lithuania (1501–1502), castellan of Trakai (1499–1522) and Vilnius (1522–1526).

== Life ==
In 1494, he signed a peace agreement with the Grand Principality of Moscow. The treaty was reinforced with engagement of Grand Duke Alexander Jagiellon of Lithuania and Helena, daughter of Ivan III. As the groom was away in Lithuania, his role was performed by Kęsgaila.

At the start of the Muscovite–Lithuanian War of 1500–1503, the Lithuanians suffered a major defeat in the Battle of Vedrosha. Grand Hetman Konstanty Ostrogski was captured and replaced with Semyon Olshanski, who had gained military experience during the Polish–Ottoman War of 1485–1503. However, Olshanski was quickly replaced by Kęsgaila, who had no prior military experience. It was possibly the result of diplomatic negotiations that ended in a military alliance with the Livonian Order. Kęsgaila brought the Grand Ducal Lithuanian Army to help the besieged Mstislavl and Smolensk, but in both cases, the Russians retreated without a fight. He was replaced as Grand Hetman of Lithuania by Stanisław Kiszka, who distinguished himself in organizing Smolensk's defense.

In 1505, he was expelled from the Lithuanian Council of Lords by Alexander Jagiellon for participation in the Union of Mielnik of 1501. In 1516, during a border conflict, Kęsgaila commanded Samogitian forces, defeated the Teutonic Order, and captured Katyčiai. However, Albert, Duke of Prussia, recaptured the village a few months later.

== Family ==
His main patrimonial property was in Kražiai. Stanislovas was married three times to daughters of local nobles – twice to daughters of Alekna Sudimantaitis and once to a daughter of Svirsky. He fathered three sons Mykolas, Jonas, and Stanislovas Kęsgaila and at least one daughter Barbara who married Jan Janowicz Zabrzeziński. Kęsgaila died in 1527 and was buried at Vilnius Cathedral.
