= Stanisław Kiszka =

Lithuanian diplomat (died 1513/1514)

- Grand Marshal of Lithuania; Grand Hetman of Lithuania
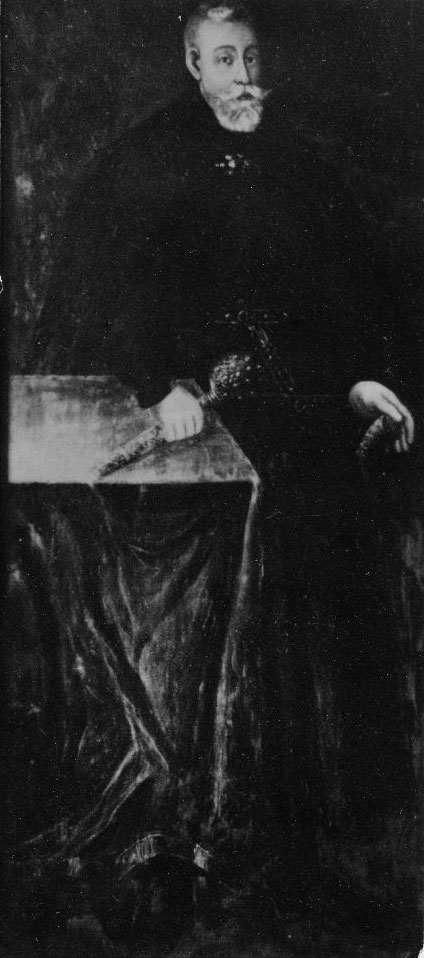
- Coat of arms: Dąbrowa
- Died: 1513 or 1514
- Family: Kiszka
- Spouses: Hanna Kuczukówna; Zofia Montygierdowiczówna
- Issue: Barbara Kiszczanka; Anna Kiszczanka; Piotr Kiszka
- Father: Piotr Paszkowicz Strumiłło

Stanisław Piotrowicz Kiszka (Lithuanian: Stanislovas Kiška; died in 1513 or 1514) was a noble, diplomat and military commander from the Grand Duchy of Lithuania. He became the progenitor of the prominent Kiszka family. He was sent on frequent diplomatic missions to the Grand Duchy of Moscow and Kingdom of Poland. He attempted to negotiate peace during the Muscovite–Lithuanian Wars and supported a closer union between Poland and Lithuania. During the Second Muscovite–Lithuanian War (1500–03), he successfully defended Smolensk and became Grand Hetman of Lithuania (commander of the army) until Konstanty Ostrogski escaped Russian captivity in 1507. Kiszka helped to subdue the Glinski rebellion in 1508. Shortly before his death, Kiszka also became Grand Marshal of Lithuania.

== Biography ==
Kiszka's father Piotr Strumiłło died in 1486 and he inherited his positions. Kiszka started his political career as a stolnik (royal pantler) and starosta of Lida in 1488. His further career was related to the favor of Alexander Jagiellon who became Grand Duke in 1492 and marriage to the daughter of Petras Jonaitis Mantigirdaitis and the last heiress of the influential Mantigirdai family. During his first years, Grand Duke Alexander appointed 11 Grand Duke's marshals, among them Kiszka, which signified his desire to build an inner circle.

=== Diplomatic career ===
Kiszka was sent on his first diplomatic mission in the spring of 1490. He presented a protest to Ivan III of Russia who harbored and protected Princes Vorotynsky and Belsky who had defected from the Grand Duchy of Lithuania. During the reign of Alexander, Kiszka served as a diplomatic envoy to the Grand Duchy of Moscow and Kingdom of Poland almost annually.

The first of Muscovite–Lithuanian Wars ended in 1494 and resulted in substantial territorial losses for Lithuania. Alexander's marriage to Helena of Moscow, daughter of Ivan III of Russia, gave Moscow further pretexts to interfere in Lithuanian affairs. During that tense time, Kiszka was a member of delegations dealing with Russian matters in 1494, 1495, 1498, and 1500. In early 1494, Kiszka received Russian envoys who came to Poland to negotiate the marriage between Alexander and Helena. In early 1495, together with other members of the Lithuanian Council of Lords, he met and greeted Helena on her way to Vilnius. In 1498, hostilities with Russia resumed – Russian army attacked Mtsensk and other locations. In June 1498, Kiszka accompanied by Ivan Sapieha traveled to Moscow in an unsuccessful attempt to broker peace. The full Muscovite–Lithuanian War broke out in 1500 and Kiszka once again attempted to negotiate peace in March 1500.

Kiszka was also sent to diplomatic missions to Poland in 1492, 1495, and 1496. In August 1492, he represented Grand Duke Alexander at the Sejm of the Kingdom of Poland where Alexander's brother John I Albert was elected as King. In 1501, Kiszka supported the proposed Union of Mielnik which would have united Poland and Lithuania into a single state. The union was inspired by the continuing Muscovite–Lithuanian Wars, particularly the defeat in the Battle of Vedrosha, and Lithuanian desire to secure Polish military support against Russia. Kiszka also attended Sejms in Radom (1505) and Lublin (1506). After the death of Alexander, Lithuanian nobles elected his brother Sigismund as Grand Duke of Lithuania in September 1506. Together with Bishop Wojciech Radziwiłł and voivode Jan Zabrzeziński, Kiszka attended the Polish Sejm in Piotrków Trybunalski that elected Sigismund as King of Poland in December 1506. In general, Kiszka was a strong proponent of a closer union between Poland and Lithuania.

=== Military career ===
Kiszka's first military experience was during the Polish–Ottoman War (1485–1503). In 1497, King John I Albert organized an invasion of Moldavia. Lithuanians refused to join the campaign but Grand Duke Alexander sent a small force of volunteers and hired men commanded by Kiszka. The Polish forces were ambushed and defeated in the Battle of the Cosmin Forest.

In 1499, Kiszka became regent of Smolensk and ordered improvements to Smolensk Kremlin. When the Muscovite–Lithuanian War resumed in 1500, Kiszka commanded a 500-men regiment in the Battle of Vedrosha. Lithuanians, commanded by Konstanty Ostrogski, suffered a great defeat, and many Lithuanian nobles, including Kiszka's brother-in-law, were killed. Kiszka then devoted his attention to preparing Smolensk for a Russian assault. For his successful command of the defense during almost the three-month Siege of Smolensk in 1502 he was promoted to the Grand Hetman. A six-year truce with Moscow was concluded in early 1503 and the Grand Duchy of Lithuania lost about a third of its territory.

Kiszka became entangled in a political conflict with royal favorite Michael Glinski and was temporarily removed from the Lithuanian Council of Lords in 1505. In August 1505, Kiszka scored a victory against the invading Crimean Khanate near Haradok. As Grand Hetman, he was supposed to command the Grand Ducal Lithuanian Army in the Battle of Kletsk against the Crimean Khanate in August 1506 but was unable due to poor health. In summer 1507, Konstanty Ostrogski escaped from the Muscovites and was reinstated as the Grand Hetman. To compensate, Kiszka was appointed as starosta of Grodno in 1508. When the war with Moscow resumed in 1507, Kiszka organized the defense of Polotsk. During the Glinski rebellion, he defended Minsk and helped to drive out Glinski's forces. His last military commands were near Orsha (18 July 1508) and Vyazma.

For his loyal service, Kizska was appointed as Grand Marshal of Lithuania after the death of Mikalojus Kęsgaila in 1512.

Dąbrowa coat of arms

== Family ==
Kiszka was a son of Piotr Strumiłło, starosta of Drohiczyn and Lida, whose ancestors hailed from Mazovia. Kiszka married Anna, daughter of Jan Kuczuk, Grand Duke's marshal, but she died within a few years. Around 1490–1492, he married Sophia Anna, daughter of Petras Jonaitis Mantigirdaitis, Voivode of Trakai. The marriage to the last heiress of the influential Mantigirdai family provided a career boost and increased Kiszka's wealth. Kiszka owned large properties across the Grand Duchy, including Ciechanowiec in present-day Poland, Nesvizh, Iwye, Kryvichy, Subotniki, Lakhva in present-day Belarus, Olyka in present-day Ukraine. His son Piotr was the 10th wealthiest noble in the Grand Duchy of Lithuania according to the 1528 military census. Kiszka was buried in Ciechanowiec.

Kiszka had three known children:

- Barbara Kiszka (from first marriage) who married Jerzy Radziwiłł in 1504
- Piotr Kiszka (died in 1534) who became Voivode of Polotsk and Elder of Samogitia
- Anna Kiszka (died in 1533) who married Stanislovas Kęsgaila and Jan Radziwiłł

|
