= Kiszka family =

Polish noble family

Dąbrowa coat of arms, used by the Kiszka family

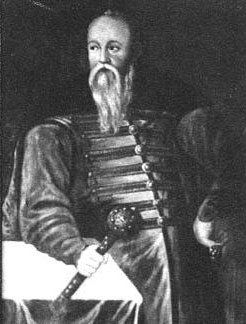
Janusz Kiszka, Great Lithuanian Hetman

The Kiszka family (plural Kiszkowie, Lithuanian: Kiškos) was a noble family (szlachta) and one of the most powerful families (magnates) of the Grand Duchy of Lithuania in the Polish–Lithuanian Commonwealth. Originating from Mazovia, the family used the Dąbrowa Coat of Arms.

== History ==
In the 15th century the family moved from Mazovia to Grand Duchy of Lithuania. It reached magnate status in the 16th century. The family continued for five generations and had 29 members. The family had numerous possessions, most of them in Podlasie, Vilnius Voivodeship, Polesie and Volhynia.

== Family tree ==
Incomplete family tree is presented below:

Paweł Strumiłło; Died in 1435/36
Jerzy Strumiłło; Advisor to Vytautas; Died in 1485	Piotr Strumiłło; Regent of Lida and Drohiczyn; Duke's marshal	Mikołaj Strumiłło; Regent of Medininkai
Stanisław Kiszka; Great Hetman; Died in 1513/14	Mikołaj Kiszka; Died in 1508	Ciechanowiec branch
Barbara Kiszka; Married Jerzy Radziwiłł	Piotr Kiszka; Voivode of Polotsk; Died in 1534	Anna Kiszka; Married Stanislovas Kęsgaila and Jan Radziwiłł
Piotr Kiszka II; Marshal of Volhynia; Died in 1550	Stanisław Kiszka II; Voivode of Vitebsk; Died in 1554	Mikołaj Kiszka II; Voivode of Podlaskie; Died in 1588
Jan Kiszka; Elder of Samogitia; 1547–1592	Stanisław Kiszka III; Deaf-mute; Died in 1617
Stanisław Kiszka IV; Bishop of Samogitia; 1584–1626	Mikołaj Kiszka III; Voivode of Mstislaw; 1588–1644	Krzysztof Kiszka; Voivode of Vitebsk; 1590–1646	Janusz Kiszka; Great Hetman; 1586–1654
