= Polish–Muscovite War =

Polish–Muscovite War can refer to:

- Muscovite–Lithuanian Wars
- Polish–Muscovite War (1605–18)
- Smolensk War (1631–34)
- Russo-Polish War (1654–67)
