= Farinheira =

Portuguese smoked sausage

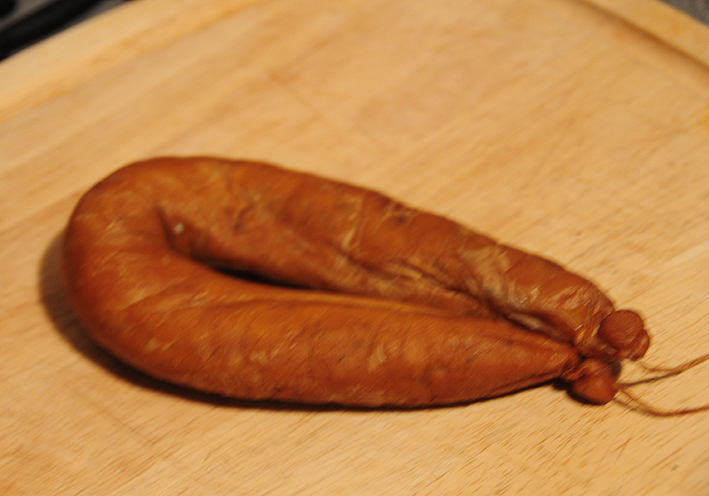
Uncooked farinheira

Farinheira (Portuguese pronunciation: [fɐɾiˈɲɐjɾɐ]) is a Portuguese smoked sausage made mainly from wheat flour, pork fat and seasonings (white wine, paprika, salt and pepper). It has a yellow/brown colour and is served in traditional dishes like feijoada or cozido à portuguesa. It is also eaten on its own, roasted or fried. In modern versions, it is previously cooked, then peeled and mixed with scrambled eggs and served on bread or toast as a starter.

Although it resembles a chouriço or other meat sausage, its taste is not meaty; it is tangy (but not hot), with a doughy texture and has a somewhat sweet finish in the palate. It is never cooked sliced, unlike other sausages, since its dough-like content would pour out of the skin during cooking, except when fried, or deep-fried, as thick slices.

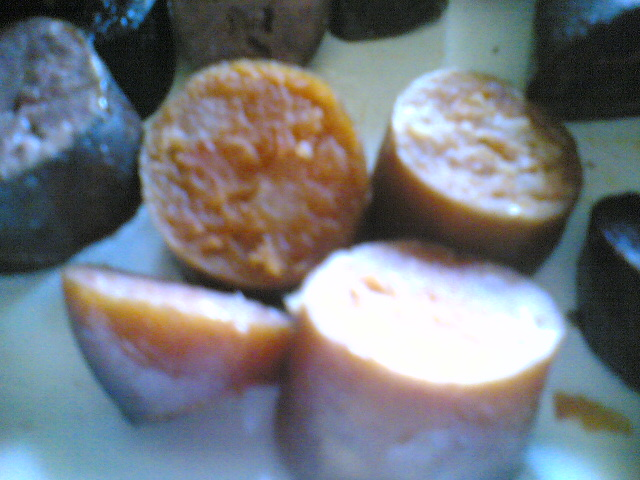
Farinheira, cooked and sliced

== Farinheiras with PGI ==
Some farinheiras made in Portugal have a PGI status:

- Farinheira de Estremoz e Borba, from Estremoz and Borba area, PGI since 2004.
- Farinheira de Portalegre, from Portalegre area, (PGI) since 1997.

== See also ==
- Alheira
- Kishka
- List of sausages
- List of smoked foods
- List of Portugal food and drink products with protected status
