= Stanisław Kiszka (bishop) =

Roman Catholic bishop (1584–1626)

Coat of arms of Dąbrowa

Stanisław Kiszka (Belarusian: Stanіslaў Kіshka; 1584 – 13 February 1626 in Wornie, Polish–Lithuanian Commonwealth) was a Catholic bishop and a convert from Calvinism. He was a noble, member of the Kiszka family.

Kiszka was born as the eldest son of a family of Vitebsk governor Stanisław Kiszka and Elżbieta Sapieha. He was brought up in the Calvinist faith, which was very common among the Lithuanian at this time. Kiszka studied at the University of Padua. In 1604 he married Zofia Konstancja Zenowicz. In 1606, together with his father not unexpectedly moved to the Catholic faith, but the marriage was soon annulled, then Kiszka was ordained to the priesthood. In 1608 became Fundator of a church in Dokshytsy. In 1619 he was consecrated bishop and appointed Bishop of Samogitia. Stanisław Kiszka died on 13 February 1626.

== Sources ==
- Piotr Nitecki, Biskupi Kościoła w Polsce w latach 965–1999. Słownik biograficzny, Warszawa 2000.
- T. Wasilewski, Stanisław Kiszka [w:] Polski Słownik Biograficzny, t. XII, 1966–1967, s. 517–518.
- Hierarchy medii Catholica et recentioris Aevi, Volume IV, Münster 1935, pp. 304 (Latin).
- Herbal Polish Kasper Niesiecki SJ, Vol I, Leipzig 1846, p 61.
- Encyklopedyja common, Volume XIV, Warszawa 1863, p 714.
- Piotr Nitecki, the Bishops of the Church in Poland in the years 965–1999. Biographical Dictionary, Warsaw 2000.
- T. Wasilewski, Stanislaw Bowel [in:] Polish Biographical Dictionary, Vol XII, 1966–1967, pp. 517–518.
- Stanislav Dumin, Guts / / The Golden Horde: The Encyclopedia . In 3 volumes Volume 2: Cadet Corps - Jackiewicz / Editorial Board.: GP.
- Paschke (gal.red.) And others.; Sett. ZE Gerasimov. - Mn.: BelEn 2006. -792 C: Il. S. 101. ISBN 985-11-0315-2, ISBN 985-11-0378-0 (v. 2).
- Nelė Asadauskienė. Kiškų giminė LDK XV a. pab.-XVI a. (Genealoginis tyrimas) Vilnius, 2003.
- Nelė Asadauskienė. Stanislovas Kiška IV. Visuotinė lietuvių enciklopedija, T. X (Khmerai-Krelle). – Vilnius: Mokslo ir enciklopedijų leidybos institutas, 2006. 182 psl.

Catholic Church titles
Preceded by Mikołaj Pac	Bishop of Samogitia; 1618–1626	Succeeded by Abraham Woyna
