= Alheira =

Type of Portuguese sausage

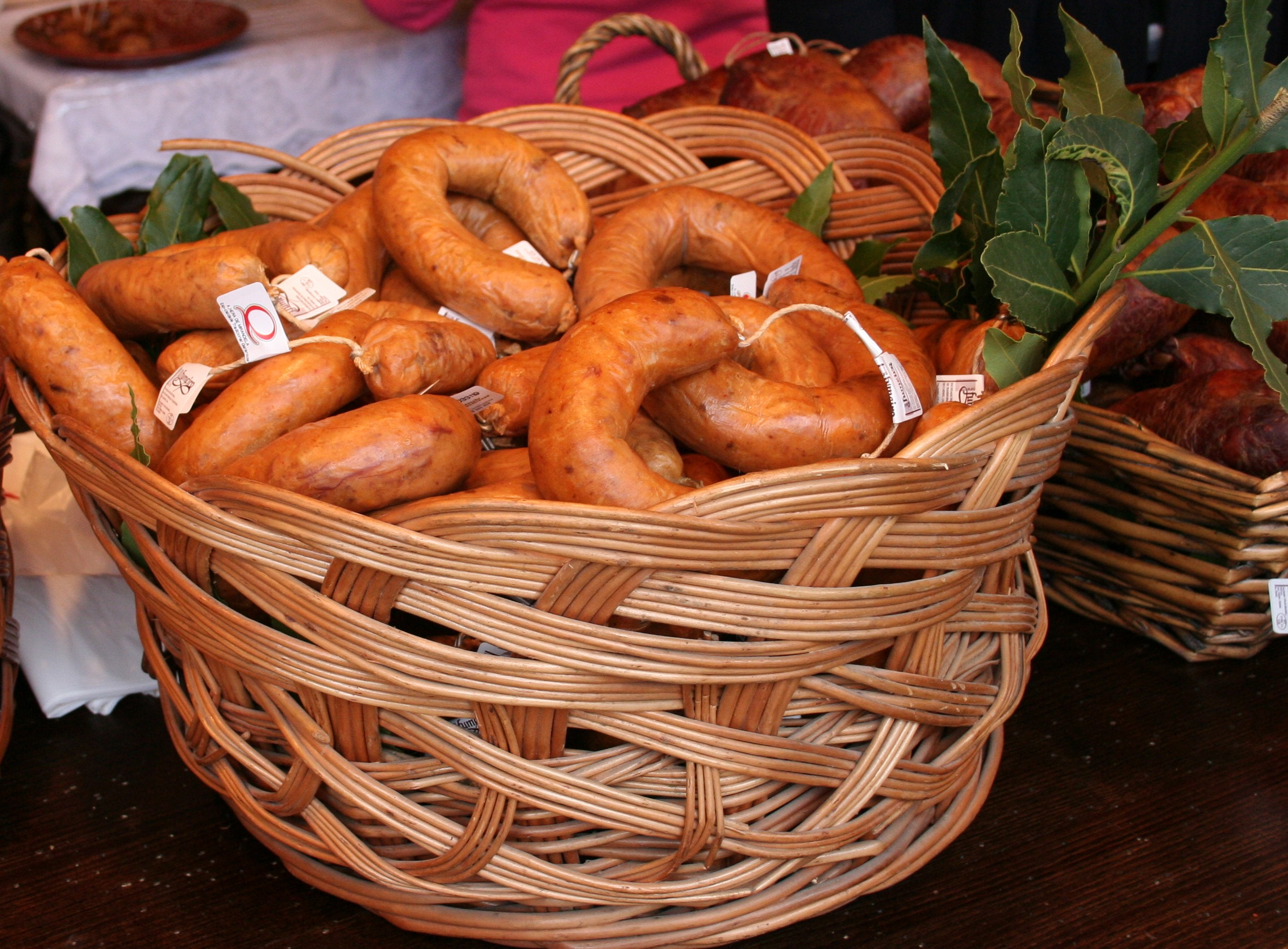
- Alheira sold at a market in Portugal
- Place of origin: Portugal
- Region or state: Trás-os-Montes and surrounding regions
- Main ingredients: Beef, poultry, bread, olive oil, lard, garlic and paprika.
- Other information: Kosher variation of a Chouriço

Alheira (Portuguese: [ɐˈʎɐjɾɐ]), or Tabafeia in Mirandese (Mirandese: [ta.βaˈfej.a]), is a type of Portuguese sausage, made with meats (usually veal, duck, chicken, quail or rabbit) and bread.

Although alheira derives from alho (garlic) and was once used to describe any sausage seasoned with it, not all present-day alheiras contain garlic, though it is still a common ingredient.

The type of sausage that became known as "alheira" was invented by the Jews of Portugal, also known as Sephardic Jews, who in 1497 were given the choice of either being expelled from the country or converting to Christianity. Those conversos who remained and secretly retained their beliefs avoided eating pork, forbidden in Judaism; this put them at risk of being noticed not to hang sausages, traditionally made of pork, in their fumeiros (smokehouses). As a way to avoid attracting the attention of the Portuguese Inquisition, or, in rural areas, the Portuguese Christians, they began to make sausages from other meats such as poultry and game, mixed with bread for texture. With time, alheira spread to the remaining population and became an example of typical Portuguese cuisine, though nowadays its preparation is no longer strictly guided by Jewish dietary precepts.

Alheiras were traditionally grilled or roasted and served with boiled vegetables. Nowadays they are often fried and served accompanied by french fries and a fried egg. They are often one of the cheapest items on restaurant menus, although those made with game can be expensive.

Although alheiras are typically associated with the city of Mirandela, the regions of Beira Alta and Trás-os-Montes are also famous for their alheiras.

Varieties with PGI protection status include Alheira de Vinhais and Alheira de Barroso-Montalegre.

== See also ==
- Farinheira
- List of sausages
- List of smoked foods
- List of Portugal food and drink products with protected status
