= Kichka =

Kichka is a surname. Notable people with the surname include:

- Henri Kichka (1926–2020), Belgian writer and Holocaust survivor
- Michel Kichka (born 1954), Israeli cartoonist and illustrator, son of Henri

== See also ==
- Kishka (disambiguation)
