= Kishka =

Kishka may refer to:

- Kishka (food) or kishke, various types of sausage or stuffed intestine
- Samiylo Kishka (1530–1602), nobleman from Bratslav
- Intestine or Gut (zoology), in East Slavic languages, also used in English-language Yiddishisms
- Kishka (prison cell), a type of cell in Soviet political prisons
- Kyshka, Perm Krai, Russia

== See also ==
- Kichka
- Kiszka
