= 1528 census of the Grand Duchy of Lithuania =

The census of 1528 was the first census carried out in the Grand Duchy of Lithuania. It was not a true census since it had limited scope: it only sought to count peasant households (Lithuanian: dūmas) for military purposes. The Grand Duchy used a conscript army where Lithuanian nobles were required to provide one soldier per each 16 or 20 households owned. Therefore, the state needed to count such households to know whether a noble fulfilled his military duty. The next census was conducted in 1565.

== Background and results ==
The Muscovite–Lithuanian Wars brought first substantial territorial losses and caused a fundamental shift in the military. Instead of being a privilege that brought profit from war loot and career opportunities in newly acquired territories, military service became an expensive duty in defense of the motherland. Each soldier had to provide his own weapons, armor, horse, and food. The nobles made their living off agriculture and looked for ways to shirk their army responsibilities. The state needed ways to enforce the conscription and started keeping detailed lists and inventories of who reported for duty and who did not. These inventories were made at the time and location of army gathering. In 1528, scribes visited nobles and their properties to count and verify the number of peasant households. The First Statute of Lithuania codified the procedures of reporting for military duty.

The census determined the maximum size of the army. Nobles could provide about 20,000 cavalrymen, magnates and city dwellers could provide additional 10,000. Because the census counted only households, it is difficult to extrapolate the number of residents. German Werner Conze estimated 1.3 million residents. Henryk Łowmiański and Jerzy Ochmański pointed out that Conze did not account for Grand Duke's and church lands that were not counted in the census and increased the estimate to more than 2 million residents.

== Wealthiest magnates ==
Largest magnates based on the number of dependent households
Rank	Noble / noble family	Soldiers	Households
1	Kęsgaila	768	12,288
2	Radziwiłł	760	12,160
3	Albertas Goštautas	466	7,456
4	Yuri Olelkovich	433	6,928
5	Konstanty Ostrogski	426	6,816
6	Astikai	338	5,408
7	Hlebavičiai	279	4,464
8	Zabrzeziński	258	4,128
9	John of the Lithuanian Dukes	236	3,776
10	Piotr Kiszka	224	3,584
11	Aleksander Chodkiewicz	201	3,216
12	Sanguszko	170	2,720
13	Ilinicz	160	2,560
14	Sapieha	153	2,448
15	Bohowitynowicze	138	2,208
16	Zenowiewicze-Korsakowie	138	2,208
17	Korsakowie	137	2,192
18	Zenowiewicze	136	2,176
19	Kostewicze	126	2,016
20	Paweł Holszański	122	1,952
21	Niemirowicze	115	1,840
22	Chrebtowicze	112	1,792
23	Mikołaj Pac	97	1,552
