= Battle of Mstislavl =

- Part of the Muscovite–Lithuanian Wars
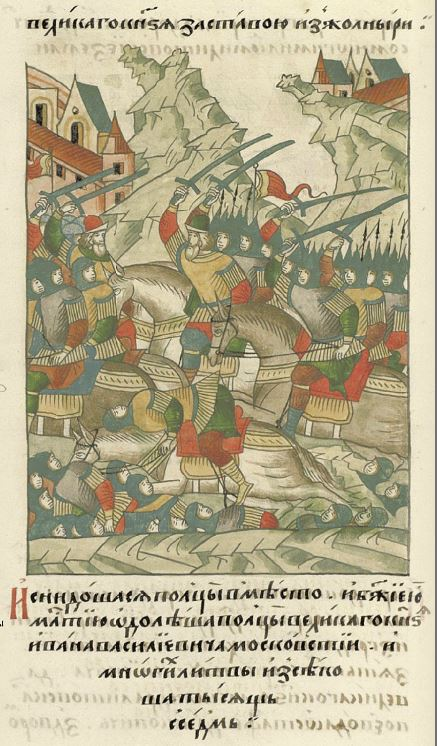
- And the voivodes came to the city of Mstislav on November 4, and with God's help, the regiments of the Grand Duke of Moscow defeated the Lithuanians, image from Illustrated Chronicle of Ivan the Terrible
Date	4 November 1501
Location	Near Mstislavl, Mogilev Region 54°0′N 31°43′E
Result	Russian victory

Belligerents
Grand Duchy of Lithuania	Grand Duchy of Moscow; Principality of Novgorod-Seversk

Commanders and leaders
Princes Mstislavsky; Ostap Dashkevych	Semyon Mozhayskiy

Casualties and losses
About 7,000 dead	Unknown

The Battle of Mstislavl took place on 4 November 1501 between the forces of the Grand Duchy of Lithuania and the forces of the Grand Duchy of Moscow and Principality of Novgorod-Seversk. The Lithuanian forces were defeated.

The Muscovite–Lithuanian Wars renewed in 1500. In 1501, Ivan III of Russia sent a new force under the command of Semyon Mozhayskiy towards Mstislavl. Local princes Mstislavsky together with Ostap Dashkevych organized the defense and were badly beaten on 4 November. They retreated to Mstislavl and Mozhayskiy decided not to attack the castle. Instead, Russian forces besieged the city and pillaged surrounding areas.

Lithuanians organized a relief force, brought by Great Hetman Stanislovas Kęsgaila. Neither Mozhayskiy nor Kęsgaila dared to attack and the Russian forces retreated without a battle.

The main task of the Russians was to prevent the joint military actions of the entire coalition (Lithuania, Livonia and the Great Horde) against Muscovy, as a result of defeating a large group near Mstislavl this task was successfully completed.
