= Piotr Kiszka =

Lithuanian nobleman (died 1534)

- Coat of arms: Dąbrowa
- Died: 1534
- Family: Kiszka
- Spouse: Anna Ilinicz
- Issue: Stanisław Kiszka; Piotr Piotrowicz Kiszka; Mikołaj Kiszka; Zofia Kiszczanka
- Father: Stanisław Kiszka

Piotr Kiszka (died 1534) was a noble of the House of Kiszka from the Grand Duchy of Lithuania. According to the military census of 1528, he was the 10th wealthiest magnate in the Grand Duchy. In times of war, he had to provide 224 fully equipped cavalrymen to the army. That meant that he had more than 23,000 peasants in his dominions.

He was the only son of Stanisław Kiszka who was active in Volhynia. From his father he inherited the title of starosta of Drohiczyn. Piotr was Voivode of Polotsk from 1521 to 1532. After the death of his brother-in-law Stanislovas Kęsgaila in 1532, he was elected as Elder of Samogitia and castellan of Trakai.

Piotr had three sons: Piotr Kiszka, who followed grandfather's footsteps and became Marshal of Volhynia, Stanisław Kiszka who was Voivode of Vitebsk, and Mikołaj Kiszka who became the Voivode of Podlaskie.
