= Andrzej Sapieha =

Polish–Lithuanian nobleman (1539–1621)

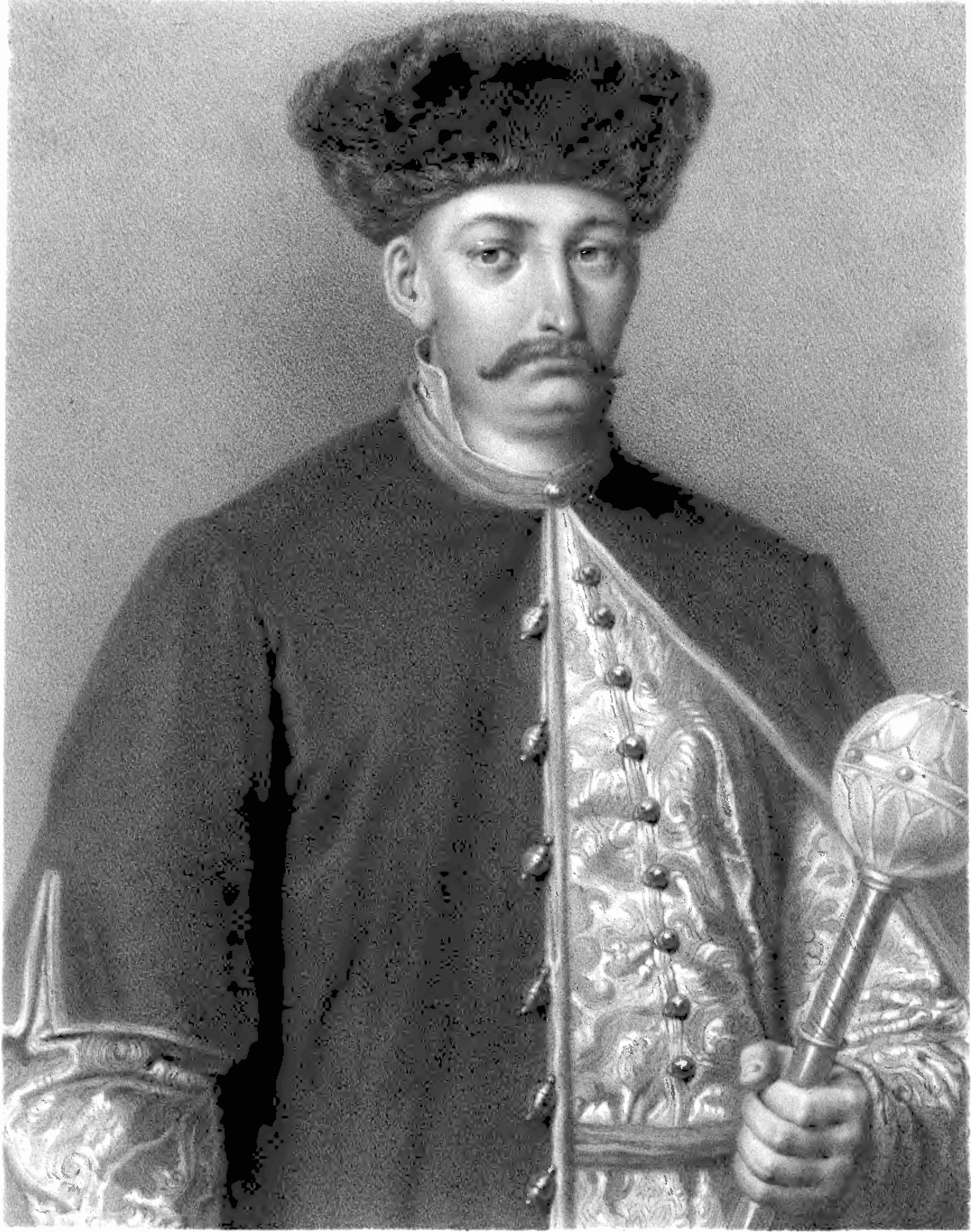
Andrzej Sapieha

Andrzej Sapieha (1539 – October 11, 1621) was a Polish–Lithuanian nobleman (szlachcic) of the Sapieha family, who served as the Great Royal Deputy Cup-bearer of Lithuania (Podczaszy wielki litewski), castellan of Minsk, and Voivode of Polotsk and Smolensk.

He was the son of Paweł Iwanowicz Sapieha and Aleksandra Chodkiewicz, and half-brother of Mikołaj and Bohdan.

Between 1575–1578 he took part in the Livonian War, fighting against the Tsardom of Russia. He was the second in command, after Mikołaj "the Red" Radziwiłł of the Polish-Lithuanian forces in the campaign of 1577–1578, and led allied Polish–Lithuanian and Swedish forces at the Battles of Wenden (1577–1578), where with 5-6 thousand soldiers he defeated a numerically superior Russian army. His victory at Wenden was later celebrated in the epic poem Radivilias.

After Zygmunt III Vasa came to the Polish throne in 1587, thanks to the support of the chancellor and kin Lew Sapieha, Andrzej was made the Great Royal Deputy Cup-bearer of Lithuania. On May 29, 1592 he was named castellan of Minsk.

He traveled abroad, mostly to Italy, in 1579, 1592 and 1608. Towards the end of his life he was made the voivode of Smolensk but most likely did not get to officially assume this office. He died on October 11, 1621.
