= Stanislovas Kęsgaila (died 1532) =

Lithuanian nobleman (1503–1532)

Stanislovas Kęstgaila (1503–1532) was a Lithuanian nobleman, son of Stanislovas Kęsgaila from the Kęsgaila family. Stanislovas Kęstgaila was the Elder of Samogitia (1527–1532) and castellan of Trakai (1528–1532). After marriage to Anna, daughter of Stanisław Kiszka, Stanislovas was the wealthiest magnate in the Grand Duchy of Lithuania.

When Stanislovas was appointed as the Elder of Samogitia in 1527, Grand Duke Sigismund I the Old limited power and income of the elder as 17 valsčius were transferred to the Grand Duke's jurisdiction. The elder was left with 8 valsčius (Karklėnai, Kražiai, Medingėnai, Patumšiai, Pavandenė, Tendžiogala, Viduklė and Žarėnai) that had only about 10% of the Samogitian population. After Stanislovas' early death, the office of the Elder of Samogitia was assigned to Piotr Kiszka, who was not a member of the Kęsgaila family, which had the position of Elders of Samogitia for more than a century. Stanislovas' last will left about a third of his possessions to the Grand Duke, who then transferred the towns to his wife, the Grand Duchess Bona Sforza. Subsequently the family faded from the public life.
