= Helena of Moscow =

Queen of Poland (1501–1506); Grand Duchess of Lithuania (1495–1506)

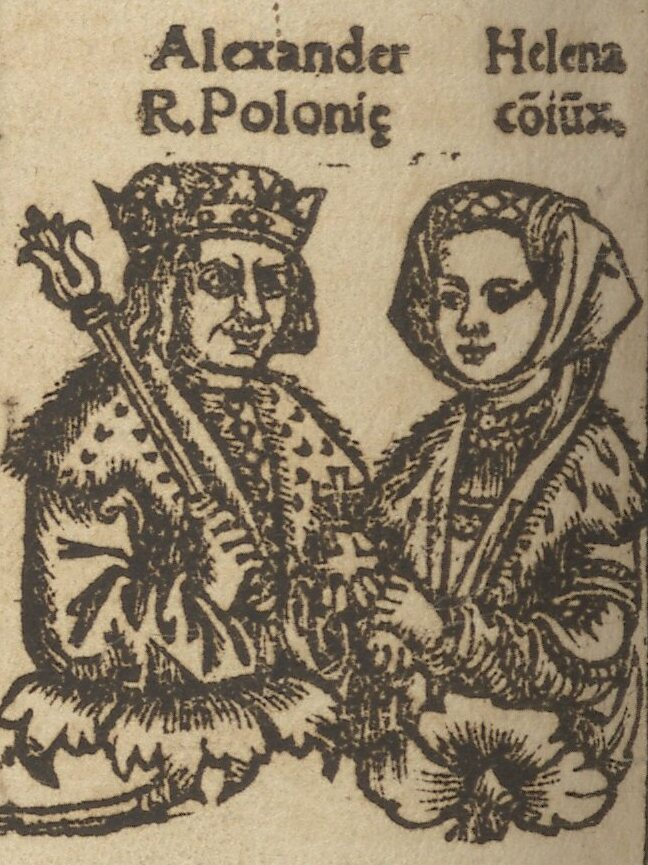
- Helena with her husband Alexander Jagiellon

Grand Duchess consort of Lithuania
- Tenure: 15 February 1495 – 19 August 1506

Queen consort of Poland
- Tenure: 3 October 1501 – 19 August 1506
- Born: 19 May 1476; Kremlin, Moscow, Grand Duchy of Moscow
- Died: 20 January 1513 (aged 36); Braslaw, Grand Duchy of Lithuania
- Burial: Cathedral of the Theotokos, Vilnius
- Spouse: Alexander Jagiellon
- House: Rurik
- Father: Ivan III of Moscow
- Mother: Sophia Palaiologina
- Religion: Eastern Orthodox

Helena Ivanovna of Moscow (Russian: Елена Ивановна; Lithuanian: Elena Maskvietė; Polish: Helena Moskiewska; 19 May 1476 – 20 January 1513) was Grand Duchess of Lithuania and Queen of Poland as the consort of Alexander Jagiellon. She was a daughter of Ivan III, Grand Prince of Moscow, and she was never crowned as she would not convert from Eastern Orthodoxy to Catholicism. Her marriage to Alexander was a constant source of tension between the Grand Duchy of Moscow and the Grand Duchy of Lithuania. Instead of guaranteeing peace, Helena's marriage gave her father Ivan III an excuse to interfere in Lithuanian affairs accusing Alexander of mistreating Helena and repressing Orthodox believers. This became the pretext to renew the Muscovite–Lithuanian Wars in 1500. The war ended with a six-year truce in 1503; the Grand Duchy of Lithuania lost about a third of its territory. Despite political tensions and religious differences, as well as the lack of surviving children, the marriage was a loving one and the royal couple was close. After her husband's death in 1506, Helena wanted to return to Moscow but was not allowed. When she planned to run away, she was arrested and reportedly poisoned.

== Biography ==
=== Early life and marriage plans ===
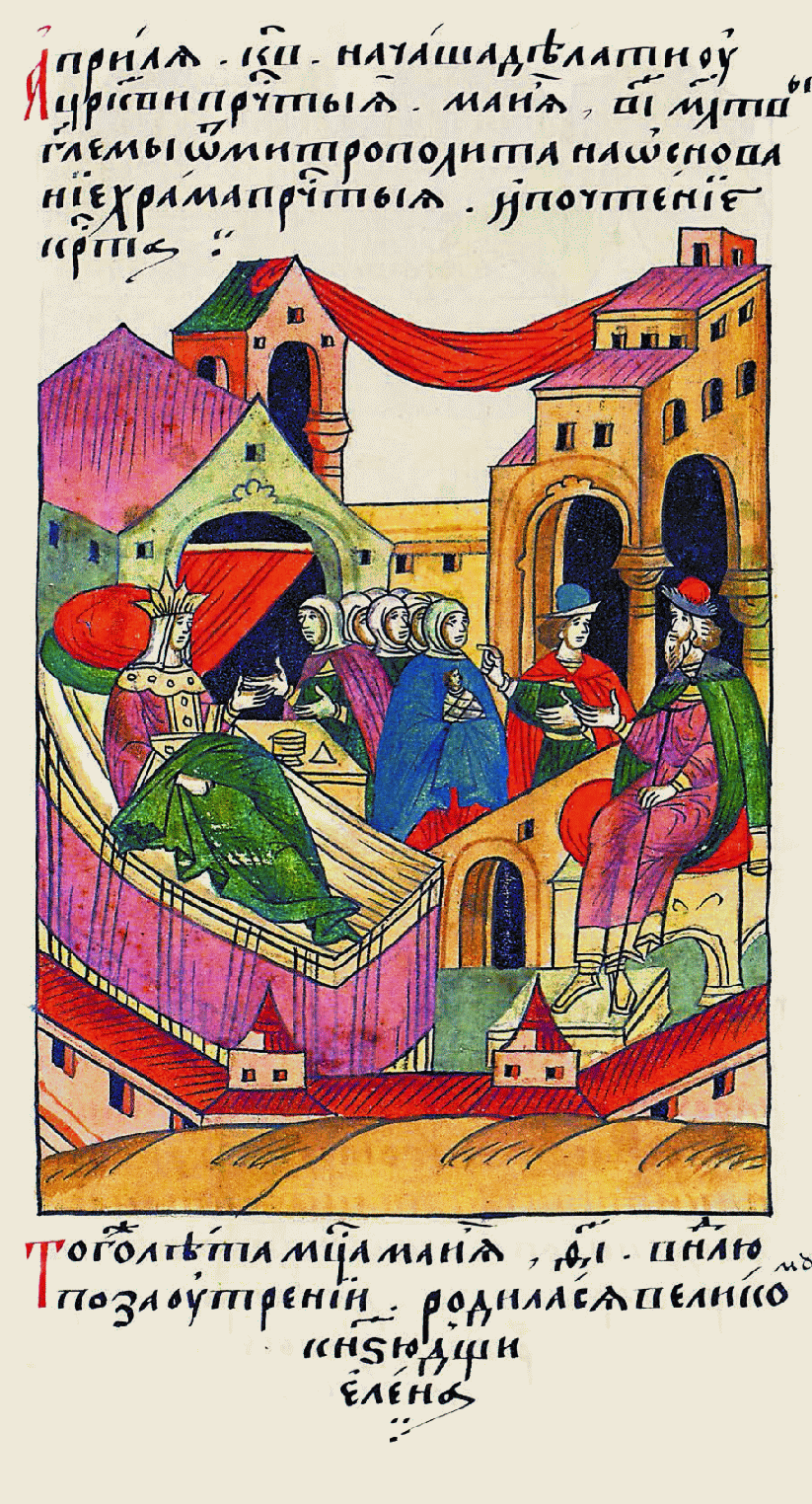
Birth of Helena from the Illustrated Chronicle of Ivan the Terrible

Helena, possibly named after her great-grandmother Empress Helena Dragaš, was the eldest surviving child of Ivan III, Grand Prince of Moscow, and his second wife Sophia Palaiologina, niece of the last Byzantine Emperor Constantine XI Palaiologos. Helena was an older sister of Grand Prince of Moscow Vasili III of Moscow. Little is known about Helena's childhood in Moscow, but it is known that she was literate and very attractive.

When Helena was eight, Jan Zabrzeziński and Ivan Yuryevich Patrikeyev discussed a marriage between Helena and one of the sons of the Polish King Casimir IV Jagiellon. At the time Poland was looking for allies in the Polish–Ottoman War (1484–1504), which broke out after the Ottomans captured Kiliya and Bilhorod-Dnistrovskyi, two major ports on the Black Sea. In 1489, Frederick III, Holy Roman Emperor, was looking for a Muscovite alliance in the Austrian–Hungarian War and against Polish claims to the Kingdom of Hungary, which were based on inheritance of Polish queen Elizabeth of Austria. The Emperor proposed to have Helena and her younger sister Theodosia marry into his family, but Ivan III refused and instead suggested the Emperor's widowed son Maximilian I. The Emperor entertained the proposal, but did not take it too seriously. At the same time Sophia's brother Andreas Palaiologos in consultation with Filippo Buonaccorsi advised her to seek an alliance with Poland. Nevertheless, an alliance between the Emperor and Moscow without a marriage agreement was concluded in August 1490. The alliance lost its relevance after the Peace of Pressburg (1491) and further proposals to marry Helena off to Maximilian or his son Philip did not gain much support.

In August 1492, shortly after the death of Polish King Casimir IV Jagiellon, Ivan III of Moscow attacked the Grand Duchy of Lithuania, launching what would become a series of Muscovite–Lithuanian Wars. John I Albert became King of Poland while Alexander Jagiellon became Grand Duke of Lithuania. The Muscovite army was successful and a peace with Moscow, guaranteed by a marriage between Alexander and Helena, became a priority for Lithuania. An "eternal" peace treaty was concluded on 5 February 1494. The agreement marked the first Lithuanian territorial losses to Moscow: the Principality of Vyazma and a sizable region in the upper reaches of the Oka River – the lost area was estimated to be approximately 87,000 square kilometres (34,000 sq mi). A day after the official confirmation of the treaty, Alexander Jagiellon was betrothed to Helena (the role of the groom was performed by Stanislovas Kęsgaila).

=== Grand Duchess of Lithuania ===
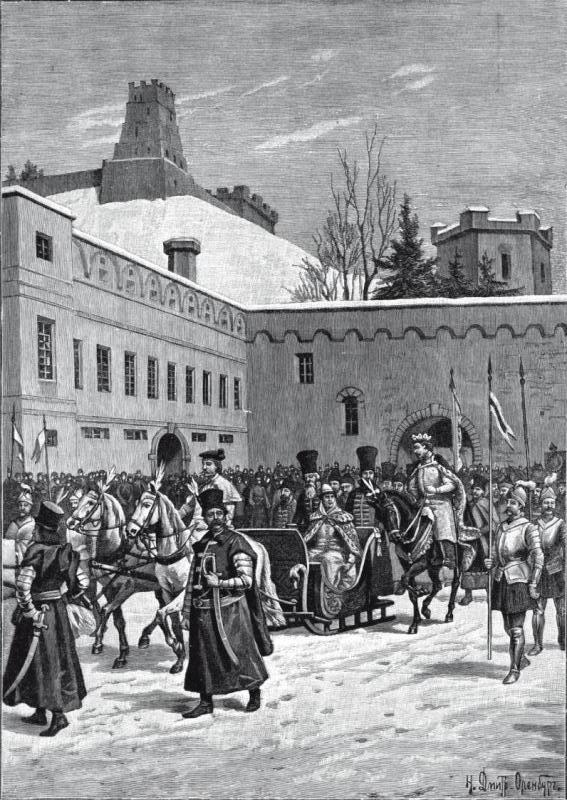
Alexander Jagiellon meets Helena in Vilnius (painting by Nikolai Dmitriev-Orenburgsky)

Helena's Orthodox faith created a number of complications. Alexander had to receive a special permission from Pope Alexander VI to marry a non-Catholic and sign a formal agreement with Ivan III in October 1494 that Helena would not be forced to convert. Alexander wanted to add that if she wished so herself, Helena could convert, but Ivan III adamantly rejected the amendment. Ivan III left Helena with detailed instructions on how to behave, whom to invite for lunch, where to pray (she was prohibited from visiting Catholic churches). Ivan III also requested that Alexander would build an Orthodox church in Vilnius Castle Complex. In January 1495, Helena, accompanied by eighty nobles and servants, departed Moscow towards Vilnius. She reached Vilnius on 15 February 1495 and the same day the couple was married. The marriage ceremony was a complex combination of Catholic and Orthodox traditions. Helena prayed and prepared in the Cathedral of the Theotokos before moving to Vilnius Cathedral. She was dressed in a traditional Russian wedding dress. The wedding ceremony was officiated by Catholic Wojciech Tabor, Bishop of Vilnius, and Orthodox Foma, priest who accompanied Helena from Moscow. Reportedly Helena did not bring much dowry (jewelry, three icons, silver and gilded dishes, expensive fabrics, furs, a carriage with horses) and Alexander did not gift her with lands after the wedding (he did so only in August 1501).

In Vilnius, Helena faced a delicate political situation. For example, it seems that Queen Elisabeth of Austria was purposefully late to her son's wedding and kept pressuring her schismatic daughter-in-law to convert. Helena refused and Elisabeth left insulted and angry not only with Helena but with Alexander as well. On one hand, Helena wanted to avoid a conflict with Catholic nobility and clergy, on the other she had to obey her father. Ivan III sent her secret letters with political instructions, but she did not get involved in her father's political intrigues and was loyal and obedient to her husband. She made donations to Orthodox Holy Spirit Church and Monastery in Vilnius, a church in Minsk, and Supraśl Lavra, but did not make any grand gestures in support of Orthodoxy. She did not protest when in May 1495 her Muscovite servants were sent back to Moscow on suspicion that they might be Muscovite agents and spies. Even in daily life the couple faced struggles. For example, when they traveled, Alexander would enter a city alone as it was customary to go to a church after the official reception; Helena would enter the city few hours later. Despite political and religious tensions, the marriage was a loving one and the royal couple remained close. Some historians see Helena's influence in Alexander's 1497 donation to the St. Michael's Golden-Domed Monastery in Kiev, 1499 economic and judiciary privilege to Orthodox clergy, and 1504 religious freedom guarantee to Orthodox peasants, however that is doubtful as Helena was passive in politics and tried to avoid conflicts.

Around 1498, Joseph Bolharynovich, Metropolitan of Kiev, and Wojciech Tabor, Bishop of Vilnius, attempted to persuade Helena to support a church union as it was envisioned at the Council of Florence – the Orthodoxs would retain their traditions, but would accept the pope as their spiritual sovereign. Helena refused, but Ivan III used it as one of casus belli when he renewed the war with Lithuania in May 1500. At the time Poland, Lithuania's ally, was engaged in the Polish–Ottoman War (1484–1504) and could not offer assistance. The Muscovite army scored victories in the Battles of Vedrosha and Mstislavl and captured several Lithuanian fortresses.

It seems that Helena was pregnant at least once, in 1497, however this pregnancy ended with the loss of a child; historian Małgorzata Duczmal believes that heavy illness of Grand Duchess from 1499 should be link with another pregnancy that ended in miscarriage.

=== Uncrowned Queen of Poland ===
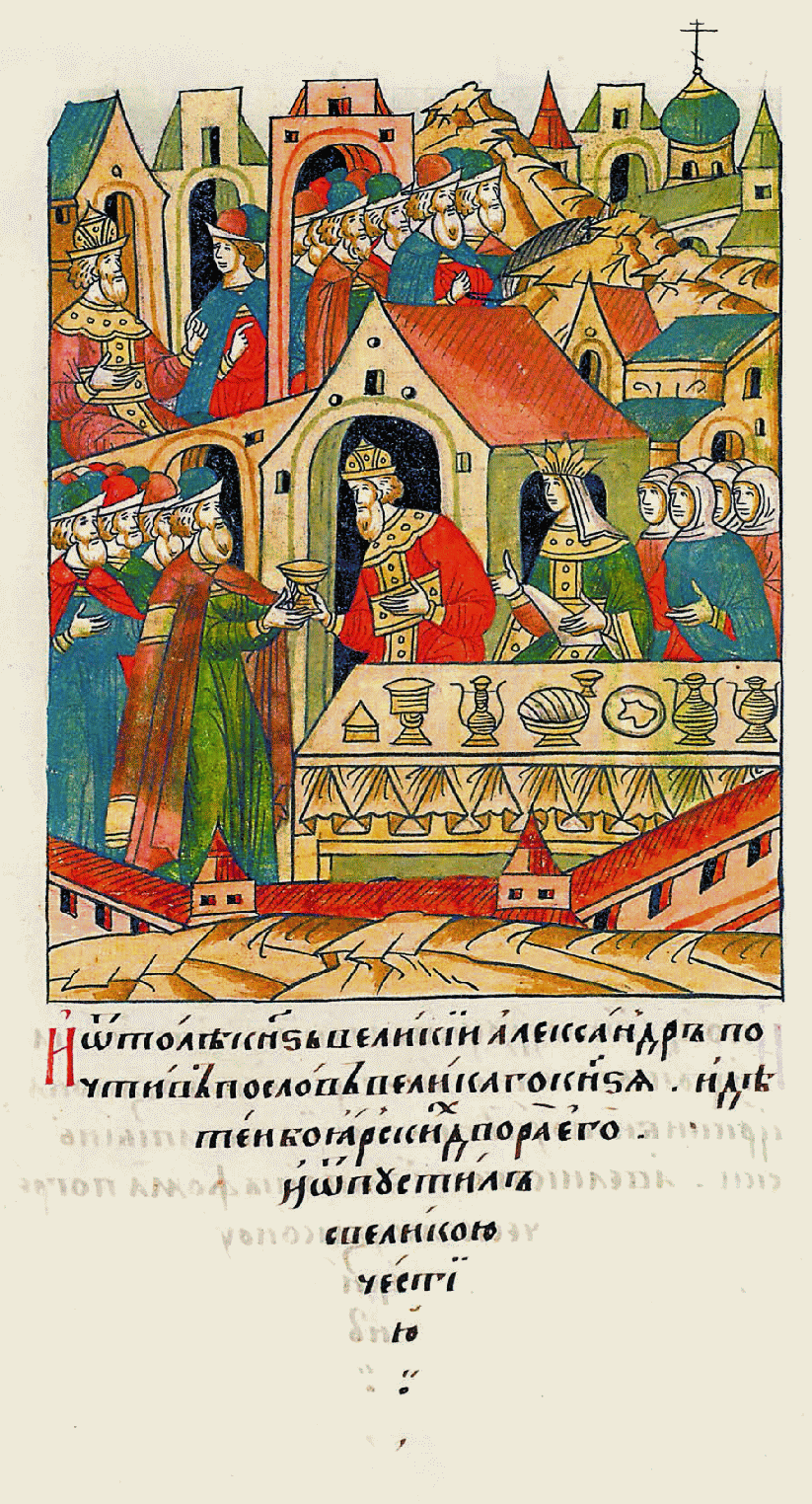
Wedding of Alexander and Helena from the Illustrated Chronicle of Ivan the Terrible

Helena's situation became further complicated when John I Albert died in June 1501 and Alexander was elected as the new King of Poland in October 1501. The Polish nobility did not want an Orthodox queen and pressured her to convert. Polish nobles, including Bishop Erazm Ciołek and Cardinal Frederick Jagiellon, discussed the issue of royal divorce. From Pope Alexander VI they obtained Alexander's absolution from his marital oath and duties to Helena as well as from the promise to Ivan III not to force Helena to convert. The pope went further and ordered Alexander to put effort in convincing Helena to convert. Despite their efforts, Helena did not convert and the royal couple remained close. When Kraków priests insulted Helena when she had an Orthodox service in one of the chapels of the Wawel Cathedral, Alexander wrote to his brother Frederick asking to discipline the priests. Alexander gifted land near Minsk and Mogilev to Helena to assure her financial independence. Alexander was crowned as King of Poland in December 1501; as an adherent to the Eastern Orthodox beliefs, Helena was ineligible to become crowned Queen of Poland. The Catholic clergy were calling her only the "wife of the King ALexander and Grand Duchess of Lithuania"; she was, however, recognized as the Queen by her husband and styled herself as such in her letters; she is also known to be acknowledged as the Queen by her brother-in-law, Sigismund I.Alexander obtained a rescission of Pope Alexander's orders to convert her to Catholicism from Pope Julius II in August 1505.

Peace negotiations between Lithuania and Moscow began in mid-1502. Helena was not directly involved in the negotiations. In March 1503, Lithuanian envoys brought her letters to various family members to Moscow. Her passionate plea to Ivan III to end the war and bring peace is often cited as proof of her intelligence and devotion to her Lithuanian subjects, but the letter could be a product of Lithuanian diplomats. Ivan III replied scolding his daughter. Nevertheless, a six-year truce was concluded; the Grand Duchy of Lithuania lost about 210,000 square kilometres (81,000 sq mi) or a third of its territory.

On 29 May 1503 Helena and Alexander visited Wisłoujście near Gdańsk; that made Helena the first known Polish queen who visited Baltic shore.

In June 1505, Alexander suffered a stroke which paralyzed his left side. During summer his health improved enough to allow him to ride a horse. In October 1505, Helena's father Ivan III died leaving her brother Vasili III on the Muscovite throne. The tension between Lithuania and Moscow lessened as the new Grand Prince wanted to consolidate his power without starting another war. In spring 1506, Alexander's health deteriorated after an exhausting journey from Lublin to Vilnius and an inappropriate medical treatments. Despite his worsening condition, Alexander called Seimas in Lida so that he could transfer the Grand Duchy of Lithuania to his brother Sigismund I the Old. In Lida, Alexander wrote his last will asking Sigismund to take good care of Helena. The Seimas was interrupted by the news of an invasion by the Crimean Khanate. The King was hastily evacuated to Vilnius, further weakening his health, while Michael Glinski organized defense and won the Battle of Kletsk.

=== Widow ===
Alexander died on 19 August 1506. Helena was thirty and without children. She wanted to return to Moscow, but marshal Wojciech Kłoczko and other nobles forced her to stay in Vilnius. Helena's brother Vasili III attempted to use her influence in an unsuccessful bid to become King of Poland and Grand Duke of Lithuania, but Helena refused to interfere. The relationship between Helena and her brother-in-law Sigismund I the Old seems to have been cold but polite. She continued to live in Vilnius Castle Complex and was granted further lands in Brańsk and Suraż in January 1507. The Muscovite–Lithuanian War resumed in April 1507. Helena and her treatment once again was at the center of political intrigues. Vasili III, just like his father, claimed that Helena was being forced to convert and even claimed that Sigismund attempted to poison Helena. Rumors circulated that Helena aided rebellious Michael Glinski who defected to Moscow, but the charge lacks proof. However, the war ended in October 1508.

In 1511, Helena expressed her wishes to return to Moscow, but Sigismund would not allow it. The relationship between Lithuania and Moscow remained tense. Sigismund and his advisers were afraid that Helena could provide valuable intelligence to Vasili III. Also, Helena led a rather frugal lifestyle and amassed substantial wealth. Sigismund wanted that money to remain in Lithuania rather than be taken to Moscow where it could be used to finance the Muscovite army. He also did not want additional complications of Helena transferring her Lithuanian landholdings to a Muscovite prince. Helena decided to return to Moscow in secret. She left her money – fourteen large boxes of gold, silver and jewels – to a Franciscan monastery in Vilnius. The plan was for her to meet Vasili's men in Braslaw, which belonged to her and was located on the Lithuania–Russia border. The plan was divulged by a servant and the Franciscans refused to ship the boxes. Helena was arrested and held in Trakai and later Birštonas.

Such treatment of the widow angered her brother Vasili III. Sigismund replied that Helena was not arrested, but simply warned that living near the unstable border was unsafe. The situation became a pretext for another war between Lithuania and Moscow. In 1513, Helena reached Braslaw and died there suddenly. According to a rumor, she was poisoned by Mikołaj Radziwiłł. It is unknown what happened to Helena's money she left with the Franciscans as there is no record that Sigismund, who was relieved to hear about her death, inherited it. Historians proposed a theory that Helena was murdered by Radziwiłł to steal the money, but it cannot be proven. Vasili III demanded Helena's assets, both money and land, from Sigismund and investigated her death.

She was buried in the Cathedral of the Theotokos in Vilnius.

== Ancestry ==
Ancestors of Helena of Moscow

16. Dmitriy Ivanovich Donskoy
8. Vasiliy I Dmitriyevich of Moscow
17. Eudoxia Dmitriyevna of Suzdal
4. Vasily II Vasiliyevich of Moscow
18. Vytautas, Grand Duke of Lithuania
9. Sophia of Lithuania
19. Anna
2. Ivan III Vasilevich of Moscow
20. Vladimir the Bold
10. Yaroslav Vladimirovich, Prince of Serpukhov
21. Elena of Lithuania
5. Maria Yaroslavna of Borovsk
22. Feodor Koshka
11. Maria Feodorovna Goltiayeva Koshkina
1. Helena of Moscow
24. John V Palaiologos
12. Manuel II Palaiologos
25. Helena Kantakouzene
6. Thomas Palaiologos
26. Constantine Dragaš
13. Helena Dragaš
3. Sophia Palaiologina
28. Andronikos Asen Zaccaria
14. Centurione II Zaccaria
29. Catherine Le Maure
7. Catherine Zaccaria
15. Asenina Palaiologina

Helena of Moscow Daniilovichi Born: 19 May 1476 Died: 20 January 1513
Royal titles
Preceded by Elisabeth of Austria	Grand Duchess consort of Lithuania; 1495–1506	Succeeded by Barbara Zápolya
Preceded by Elisabeth of Austria	Queen consort of Poland; 1501–1506	Succeeded by Barbara Zápolya
