= Janusz Kiszka =

Polish–Lithuanian noble and politician (1586–1654)

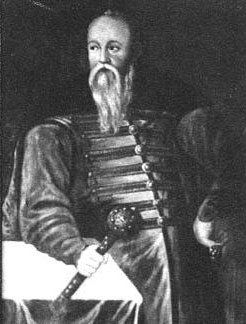
Janusz Kiszka

Janusz Kiszka (born 1600 in Krzywicze (today Belarus) – 1653) was a Polish politician and magnate in the 17th century Polish–Lithuanian Commonwealth. Last of the Kiszka family. Royal Rotmistrz, starosta of Parnawa from 1610, Voivode of Polock since 1621, Field Lithuanian Hetman since 1635, Great Lithuanian Hetman since 1646.

Raised a Calvinist, he converted with his father and brothers to Roman Catholicism in 1606. Unlike his siblings, he was quite tolerant of his former co-religionists, also because his wife was a Calvinist too.

He married Krystyna Drucka-Sokolińska, and had no heirs.

Coat of arms of Dąbrowa
