= Polotsk Voivodeship =

Voivodeship of the Grand Duchy of Lithuania

Coordinates: 55°29′17″N 28°48′26″E

Polotsk Voivodeship Województwo połockie (Polish) Palatinatus Polocensis (Latin)
- Voivodeship of the Grand Duchy of Lithuania, later Polish–Lithuanian Commonwealth
- 1504–1793
- Coat of arms

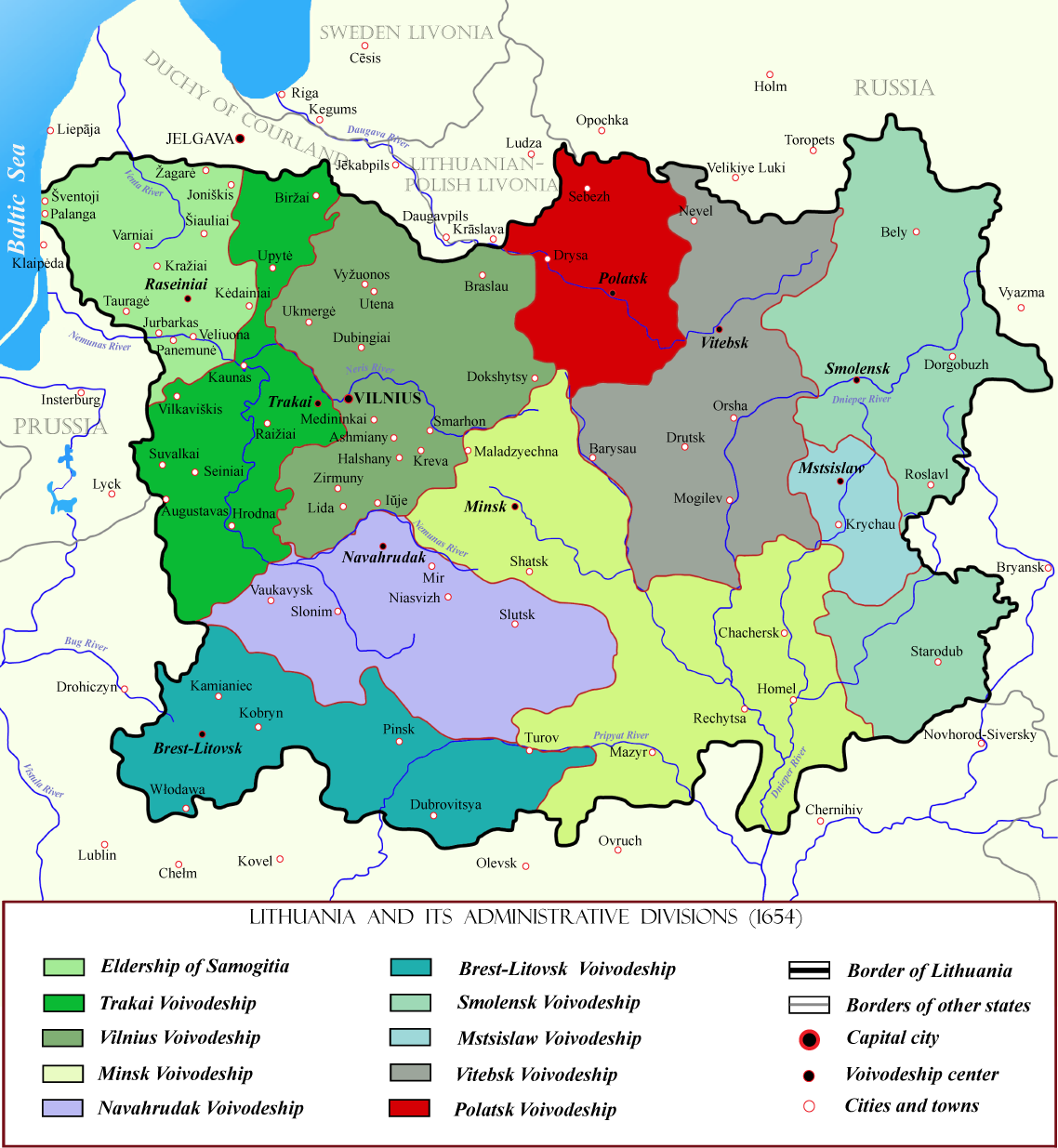
- Połock Voivodeship in red. Voivodeship's borders did not change since the Union of Lublin.
- Połock Voivodeship in the Polish–Lithuanian Commonwealth
- Capital: Połock
- Area
- 21,800 km^{2} (8,400 sq mi)
- History
  - Established: 1504
  - Second Partition of Poland: 1793
- Political subdivisions: none
Preceded by	Succeeded by
Principality of Polotsk	Russian Empire
- Today part of: Belarus; Russia

Polotsk, Polatsk or Połock Voivodeship (Latin: Palatinatus Polocensis; Lithuanian: Polocko vaivadija; Polish: Województwo połockie, Belarusian: Полацкае ваяводства) was a unit of administrative division and local government in the Polish–Lithuanian Commonwealth (Grand Duchy of Lithuania) since the 15th century until the partitions of Poland in 1793.

== History ==
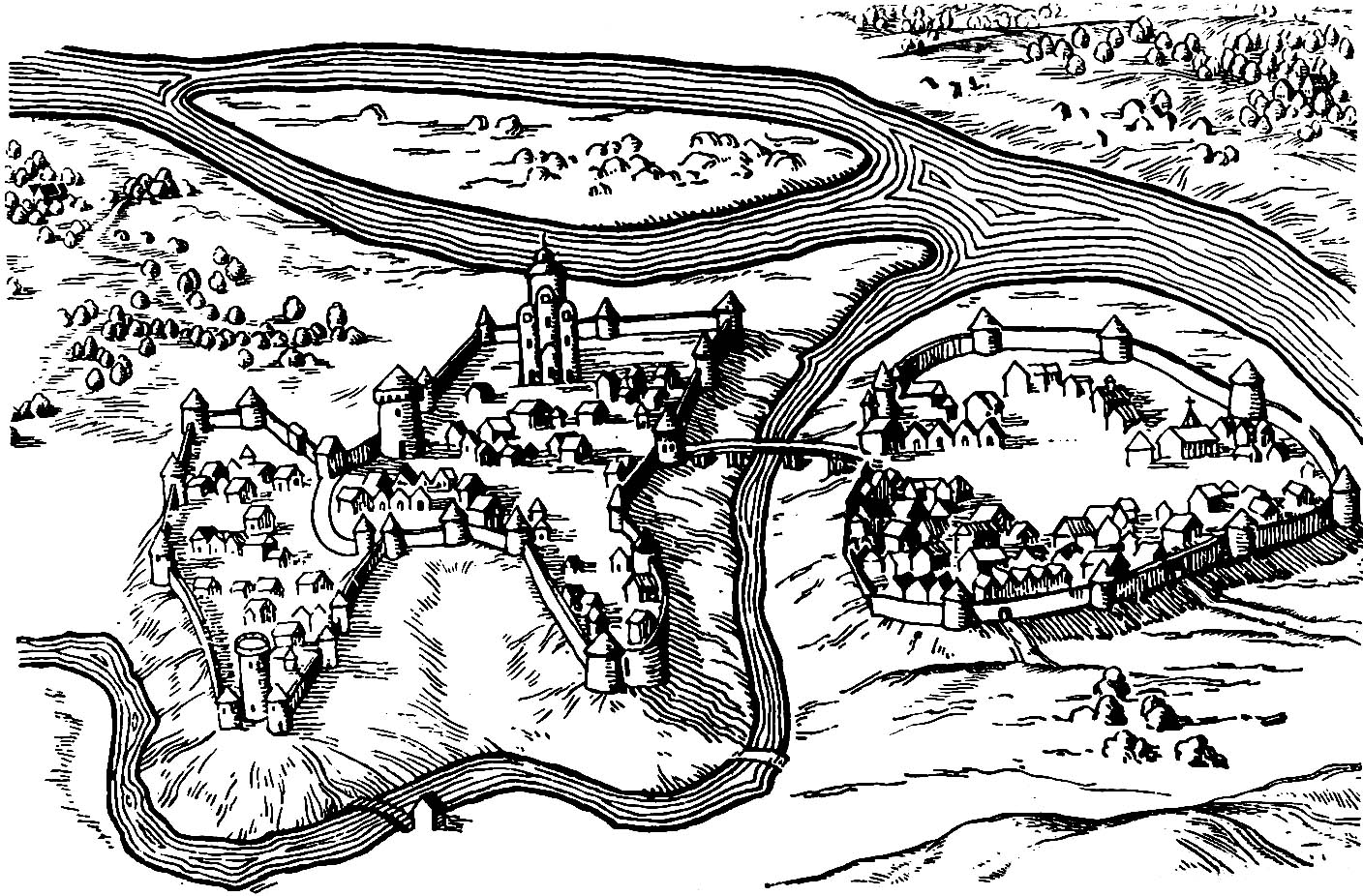
Połock, capital of the voivodeship, in the 16th century

The voivodeship history can be traced to the Principality of Polotsk, conquered by the Grand Duchy of Lithuania around late 14th / early 15th centuries. From 1504 the former Principality was recognized as a voivodeship.

Zygmunt Gloger in his monumental book Historical Geography of the Lands of Old Poland provides this description of the Połock Voivodeship:

“Połock, in Latin Polocia, Polocium, lies on the right bank of the Dvina, and is regarded as one of the oldest gords of Rus’. In the 13th century, the Principality of Polotsk was ruled by Kievan princes, but in app. 1225 it was seized by the Lithuanians under Duke Mindaugas (...) Duke Vytautas named the first starosta of Połock, and in app. 1500, the starosta was renamed into the Voivode of Połock, while the Duchy was turned into a voivodeship, divided into halves by the Dvina (...)

The voivodeship had two senators, who were the Voivode and the Castellan of Połock (...) Since it was not too large and its population was not numerous, furthermore, its capital was located in the middle, the voivodeship was not divided into counties. Its courts were located in Połock, where the sejmiks also took place. Połock Voivodeship had two envoys in the Sejm, and two deputies to the Lithuanian Tribunal”.

== Population ==
- 109,848 in 1790

== Administration ==
Voivodeship Governor (Wojewoda) seat:

- Połock

Administrative division:

- this voivodeship was not divided into counties

Number of Senators:

- 2

Number of envoys in the Sejm:

- 2

== Voivodes ==
- Stanisław Hlebowicz
- Albertas Goštautas
- Stanisław Ościk
- Piotr Kiszka
- Jan Hlebowicz
- Stanisław Dowojno
- Mikołaj Dorohostajski
- Andrzej Sapieha
- Michał Drucki-Sokoliński
- Janusz Kiszka
- Aleksander Ludwik Radziwiłł
- Jan Karol Kopeć
- Kazimierz Jan Sapieha
- Jan Jacek Ogiński
- Dominik Michał Słuszka
- Stanisław Ernest Denhoff
- Aleksander Michał Sapieha
- Józef Sylwester Sosnowski
- Tadeusz Żaba

== Bibliography ==
- Polock Voivodeship, description by Zygmunt Gloger
