= Battle of Vedrosha =

1500 battle between Lithuania and Muscovy

Coordinates: 54°49′07″N 33°28′37″E

- Part of the Muscovite–Lithuanian Wars
- Map of the Muscovite army movements in 1500
Date	14 July 1500
Location	Vedrosha River, close to Dorogobuzh, Grand Duchy of Lithuania.
Result	Muscovite victory

Belligerents
Grand Duchy of Lithuania	Grand Duchy of Moscow

Commanders and leaders
Prince Konstanty Ostrogski (POW)	Prince Daniil Shchenya

Strength
3,500–4,000 (possibly underestimated) Some Russian sources claim: 40,000 (perhaps exaggeration)	20,000–40,000 (perhaps exaggerated)

Casualties and losses
Russian claims: • 5,000 dead; • 30,000 dead ("exaggeration"); • 500 taken captive	Unknown

The Battle of Vedrosha (Lithuanian: Vedrošos mūšis; Russian: Ведрошская битва) was fought near the Vedrosha river, close to Dorogobuzh (then in the Grand Duchy of Lithuania, now in Russia) on 14 July 1500, during the Second Muscovite–Lithuanian War (1500–1503).

In the battle of Vedrosha, Muscovite forces defeated outnumbered Lithuanian troops attacking them. The Battle of Vedrosha was the first major Muscovite victory over Lithuania in the war of 1500–1503.

The Lithuanian geopolitical situation after the battle was desperate. Alexander of Lithuania unsuccessfully tried to even make the Crimean Khanate under Meñli I Giray and Moldavia under Stephen III begin hostilities against Muscovy, with which they were allied. The only help the Lithuanians received was the Livonian Order's attack on Pskov, which failed due to dysentery.

The battle is mentioned in several Muscovite Chronicles, but these generally confuse details, for example, place names (e.g. Vyazma instead of Vedrosha) and the names of the military leaders.

== Background ==
=== Lithuanian–Muscovite "Perpetual peace" treaty in 1494 ===
At the turn of the 15th–16th centuries, the Prince of Moscow, openly interfered in the internal affairs of the Grand Duchy of Lithuania. The Muscovites agitated the Grand Duchy's Eastern Orthodox inhabitants against their Catholic rulers and tried to enflame to renounce Lithuania and join Muscovy. The First Lithuanian–Muscovite War (1487–1494) concluded with a perpetual peace treaty in 1494 between Grand Duke Alexander of Lithuania and Grand Duke Ivan III of Moscow (both descended from the Lithuanian dynasty of the Gediminids).

The "Perpetual Peace" treaty with Moscow meant only a short respite for Lithuania, because Ivan III declared war to Lithuania once more on 3 May 1500 to join its eastern lands to Muscovy. The marriage of Alexander and Elena, daughter of Ivan III, in 1495 did not lead to peaceful Lithuanian-Muscovite relations or a common policy against the Tatars, as was hoped for by some. Alexander's brothers John I Albert and Vladislaus II of Hungary could not help because they were fighting in the Polish–Ottoman War (1485–1503).

=== Muscovy breaks peace agreement, declares war on Lithuania in 1500 ===
The official pretext for the Muscovite declaration of war was the escape of Duke Simeon Ivanovich Belsky to Moscow in 1499. Muscovites declared themselves defenders of the rights of the Eastern Orthodox in Lithuania, and, along with Bielski's escape, provided alleged evidence about attempts of forcefully converting Elena, now Grand Duchess of Lithuania, to Catholicism. They also referred to the activities of Catholic missionaries in the eastern lands of Lithuania where many Orthodox lived.

After the declaration of war, the princes of Chernigov and Novgorod-Seversk defected to Muscovy. The main object contested between Muscovy and Lithuania were the vast territories close to the Dnieper, which was strategically important for communication and trade.

=== Start of the war ===
In 1500, the war took place in three general areas: Novhorod-Siverskyi, Smolensk and Toropets. Muscovites quickly occupied the Severian lands and part of Chernihiv. The main fighting happened in the direction of Smolensk, which was the war's second most strategically important front.

After the Muscovites captured the Dorogobuzh fortress near the Dnieper, half of the Grand Ducal Lithuanian Army, which was a vanguard of about 3,500 horsemen, moved towards Smolensk and were joined the 500 horsemen of the regent of Smolensk, Stanisław Kiszka.

== Battle ==
Confident in his strength and underestimating the enemy, the Grand Hetman of Lithuania Konstanty Ostrogski decided to attack first with the 4,000 Lithuanian soldiers. One Russian source doubts this number of troops, considering it to be underestimated by several times. The Muscovite forces he was facing had at least 20,000 soldiers. The Lithuanians attacked the camp of the central Muscovites forces at a tributary of the Dnieper, the Vedrosha River, but were tricked into a well-organized ambush.

The vanguard of the Muscovite army lured the Lithuanian army into the main Muscovite forces of about 40,000 people, commanded by boyars Daniil Shchenya and Yakov Koshkin-Zakharyin, and was defeated. Little is known about the battle itself. The battle's outcome was determined not only by the skillfully chosen tactics of the Muscovites but also by their numerical superiority. Muscovites employed similar tactics as those in the Battle of Kulikovo.

The entire Lithuanian military leadership was captured by Muscovite forces, namely the Grand Hetman of Lithuania Konstanty Ostrogski, the regent of Anykščiai Grigalius Astikas, the regent of Naugardukas Jonas Liutauras Chreptavičius, Mykolas Glebavičius, and other Lithuanian nobles. Ostrogski escaped from Moscow in 1507.

== Outcome ==
The defeat at Vedrosha greatly affected Lithuanian society. The Muscovites did not utilize the victory to the fullest strategically, meaning that the battle at Vedrosha had more political and moral significance. Although the road to Smolensk was open for the Muscovites after this battle, despite their proximity to Smolensk and a considerable, at least theoretical, chance of capturing it, the Muscovites limited themselves and did not take advantage of the opportunity.

Meanwhile, the other part of the Lithuanian army, led by Alexander of Lithuania, was in Borisovsky district, about 200 kilometres (120 mi) from Smolensk, too far away to quickly salvage the situation. Overall, the Grand Duke of Lithuania and the Lithuanian military leadership, especially Grand Hetman Ostrogski, received a painful lesson, which they did not repeat, to not divide limited forces for important operations and, on the contrary, concentrate them as much as possible.

== Sources ==
- Alexeev, Yuri (2009). Походы русских войск при Иване III [Campaigns of Russian troops under Ivan III] (in Russian). St. Petersburg University Press. ISBN 978-5-288-04840-1.
- Fennell, John Lister Illingworth (2 August 1990). "Russia, 1462–1584". In Elton, Geoffrey Rudolph (ed.). The New Cambridge Modern History. Vol. 2 (2nd ed.). Cambridge University Press. pp. 595–623. doi:10.1017/chol9780521345361.024. ISBN 978-1-139-05577-2.
- Fine, John V. A. (1966). "The Muscovite Dynastic Crisis of 1497–1502". Canadian Slavonic Papers. 8: 198–215. doi:10.1080/00085006.1966.11417919. JSTOR 40866006.
- Lithuanian Institute of History (13 July 2009). "1500 07 14 antrajame kare su Maskvos DK lietuvių kariuomenė patyrė pralaimėjimą" (in Lithuanian).
- Matulevičius, Algirdas (12 September 2018). "Vedrošos mūšis". Universal Lithuanian Encyclopedia (in Lithuanian).
- Zimin, Aleksandr A. (1982). "Победа при Ведроши" [Victory at Vedrosha]. Россия на рубеже XV—XVI столетий [Russia at the turn of the 15th and 16th centuries] (in Russian). Moscow: Myslʹ.
- Razin, Ye. A. (1999). История военного искусства VI–XVI вв. Saint Petersburg: ООО "Издательство Полигон". ISBN 5-89173-040-5 (VI – XVI вв.). ISBN 5-89173-038-3 (Военно-историческая библиотека).
