= Muscovite–Lithuanian Wars =

Series of wars between the Grand Duchy of Lithuania and the Grand Duchy of Moscow

Muscovite—Lithuanian wars
Date	1245-1618
Location	Eurasia

Belligerents
Grand Duchy of Lithuania; Golden Horde; Poland Poland–Lithuania	Novgorod Republic; Grand Principality of Moscow Russia

Commanders and leaders
(Grand Duchy of Lithuania) Algirdas (Grand Duchy of Lithuania) Kęstutis (Grand Duchy of Lithuania) Jogaila (Grand Duchy of Lithuania) Władysław III of Poland (Grand Duchy of Lithuania) Sigismund Kęstutaitis (Grand Duchy of Lithuania) Casimir IV (Grand Duchy of Lithuania) Alexander I Jagiellon (Grand Duchy of Lithuania) Sigismund I (Grand Duchy of Lithuania) Sigismund II (Grand Duchy of Lithuania) Henry III (Grand Duchy of Lithuania) Anna (Grand Duchy of Lithuania) Sigismund III	Alexander Nevsky; Dmitry Donskoy; Vasily I Vasily II; Ivan III; Vasili III / (Tsardom of Russia) Ivan IV Vasilyevich

The Muscovite–Lithuanian Wars (also known as the Russo-Lithuanian Wars or simply Muscovite Wars or Lithuanian Wars) (Note: The conflicts are referred to as 'Muscovite wars' (Polish: wojny moskiewskie) in Polish historiography and as 'Lithuanian wars' in Russian one; English historiography uses both, ex. 'Muscovite wars' in Lukowski, Jerzy; Hubert Zawadzki (2001), A Concise History of Poland, Cambridge University Press, p. 63, ISBN 978-0-521-55917-1 and 'Lithuanian wars' in Wilson, Andrew (2002). The Ukrainians: Unexpected Nation. Yale University Press. p. 53. ISBN 978-0-300-09309-4. Some sources also may use Russo- instead of Muscovite.) were a series of wars between the Grand Duchy of Lithuania (in the later wars allied with the Kingdom of Poland) and the Grand Duchy of Moscow, which was later unified with other Russian principalities to eventually become the Tsardom of Russia. After several defeats at the hands of Ivan III and Vasily III, the Lithuanians were increasingly reliant on Polish aid, which eventually became an important factor in the creation of the Polish–Lithuanian Commonwealth. Before the first series of wars in the 15th century, the Grand Duchy of Lithuania controlled vast stretches of Eastern European land, from Kiev to Mozhaysk, following the collapse of Kievan Rus' after the Mongol invasions. Over the course of the wars, particularly in the 16th century, the Muscovites expanded their domain westwards, taking control of many principalities.

== Historical background ==
=== First clashes ===
In 1245, Alexandr Nevsky, the Prince of Novgorod, decided to go on a campaign after the Lithuanians attacked the border area and robbed many locals. He headed to Lithuania, where he freed all the prisoners and defeated the Lithuanians at Lake Zizicekoe. On the way back, the Lithuanians tried to take revenge, but were destroyed again.

=== 14th century: Lithuanian expansion ===
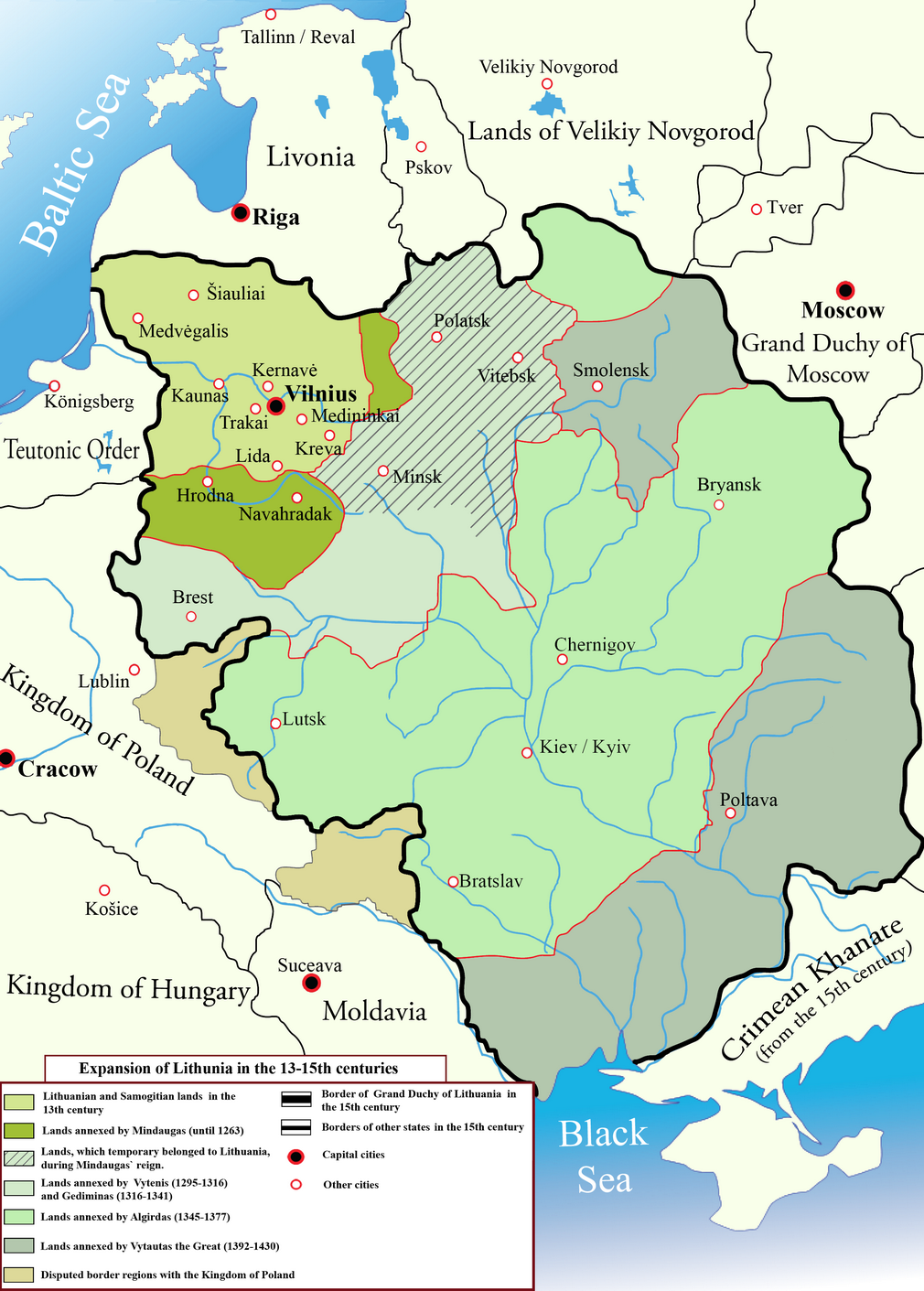
Expansion of the Lithuanian state from the 13th to 15th centuries

The Grand Duchy of Moscow and Lithuania had fought each other since the reign of Gediminas, who defeated a coalition of Ruthenian princes in the Battle on the Irpin River and seized Kiev, the former capital of Kievan Rus'. By the mid-14th century, an expanding Lithuania had absorbed Chernigov and Severia. Algirdas, the successor of Gediminas, allied with the Principality of Tver and undertook three expeditions against Moscow, attempting to take advantage of the youth of the Grand Prince of Moscow, Dmitry Ivanovich, who nevertheless succeeded in fending off these encroachments.

The first intrusions of Lithuanian troops into the Moscow principality occurred in 1363. In 1368, Algirdas carried out the first major expedition against Moscow. Having devastated the Muscovite borderland, the Lithuanian prince routed the troops of the Prince of Starodub Simeon Dmitrievich Krapiva and Prince of Obolensk Konstantin Yurievich. On November 21, Algirdas routed the Moscow sentry troops on the river Trosna. However, he could not seize the Moscow Kremlin. The troops of Algirdas ruined the area around the city and captured a significant portion of the Muscovite population. In 1370, Algirdas made another expedition against Moscow. He ruined the area around Volok Lamskiy. On December 6, he besieged Moscow and started to devastate the surrounding area. Having received the message that Prince Vladimir Andreevich was coming to help Moscow, Algirdas returned to Lithuania. In 1372 Algirdas attacked the Moscow principality again and reached Lyubutsk. However, the Grand Prince of Moscow Dmitry Ivanovich routed the sentry troops of Algirdas, and the Lithuanians concluded an armistice with Moscow. In 1375, Algirdas devastated the Smolensk principality.

Some Muscovite elements wished to take over all of the land that was formerly of the Kievan Rus', most of which was now in the Lithuanian state. Furthermore, Moscow sought to expand its access to the Baltic Sea, an increasingly important trade route. Thus, the conflict between Lithuania and Moscow was only just beginning.

=== 15th century: strengthening Moscow ===
Conflicts resumed during the reign of Dmitry's son Vasily I, who was married to Sophia, the sole daughter of the Lithuanian Grand Duke Vytautas the Great. In 1394, Vytautas devastated the Principality of Ryazan, leaving many settlements in ashes. In 1402, he quarrelled with his son-in-law over control of the Principality of Smolensk. After Vytautas captured his capital, Yury of Smolensk fled to Vasily's court and tried to enlist his assistance in regaining Smolensk. Vasily hesitated until Vytautas advanced on Pskov. Alarmed by Lithuania's continuing expansion, Vasily sent an army to aid the Pskovians against his father-in-law. The Russian and Lithuanian armies met near the Ugra River, but neither commander ventured to commit his troops to battle. A peace ensued, whereby Vytautas kept Smolensk.

== First border war (1487–1494) ==
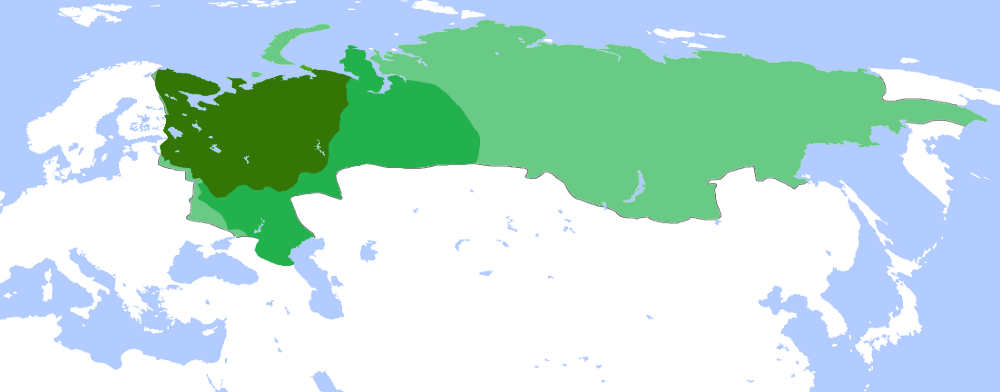
Expansion of the Russian state, 1500–1626

Ivan III considered himself an heir to the fallen Byzantine Empire and defender of the Eastern Orthodox Church. He proclaimed himself sovereign of all Russia, and claimed patrimonial rights to the former lands of Kievan Rus'. Such ambitions led to the steady growth of Muscovite territory and power. The supremacy of the Golden Horde, known as the "Mongol Yoke," ended in 1480 with the defeat of Ahmed Khan bin Küchük in the Great Stand on the Ugra River. Moscow extended its influence to the Principality of Ryazan in 1456, annexed the Novgorod Republic in 1477, and annexed the Principality of Tver in 1483. Further expansionist goals of Ivan III clashed with the Lithuanian interests.

Around 1486–1487, territories along the ill-defined Lithuanian–Muscovite border in the upper reaches of the Oka River were under attack by Moscow and its ally Meñli I Giray, Khan of Crimea. Tensions continued to rise. In August 1492, without declaring war, Ivan III began large military actions: he captured and burned Mtsensk, Lyubutsk, Serpeysk, and Meshchovsk; raided Mosalsk; and attacked the territory of the Dukes of Vyazma. Orthodox nobles began switching sides to Moscow as it promised better protection from military raids and an end to religious discrimination by Catholic Lithuanians. Ivan III officially declared war in 1493, but the conflict soon ended. Grand Duke of Lithuania Alexander Jagiellon sent a delegation to Moscow to negotiate a peace treaty. An "eternal" peace treaty was concluded on February 5, 1494. The agreement marked the first Lithuanian territorial losses to Moscow: the Principality of Vyazma and a sizable region in the upper reaches of the Oka River. The lost area was estimated to be approximately 87,000 km^{2} (34,000 sq mi). A day before the treaty's official confirmation, Alexander Jagiellon was betrothed to Helena, daughter of Ivan III (the role of the groom was performed by Stanislovas Kęsgaila as Alexander was in Poland).

== Second war (1500–1503) ==
Military campaigns in 1500

Hostilities were renewed in May 1500, when Ivan III took advantage of a planned Polish–Hungarian campaign against the Ottoman Empire: While preoccupied with the Ottomans, Poland and Hungary would not assist Lithuania. The pretext was the alleged religious intolerance toward the Orthodox in the Lithuanian court. Helena was forbidden by her father Ivan III to convert to Catholicism, which provided numerous opportunities for Ivan III, as the defender of all Orthodox, to interfere in Lithuanian affairs and rally Orthodox believers.

The Muscovites promptly overran Lithuanian fortresses in Bryansk, Vyazma, Dorogobuzh, Toropets, and Putivl. Local nobles, particularly the Vorotynskys, often joined the Muscovite cause. Another attack came from the southeast into Kiev Voivodeship, Volhynia, and Podolia. On July 14, 1500, the Lithuanians suffered a great defeat in the Battle of Vedrosha, and the Lithuanian Grand Hetman Konstanty Ostrogski was captured. The defeat was one of the reasons for the proposed Union of Mielnik between Poland and Lithuania. In November 1501, the Lithuanians were defeated again in the Battle of Mstislavl. The Crimean Tatars destroyed the Golden Horde, a Lithuanian ally, when its capital New Sarai was conquered in 1502.

In June 1501, John I Albert, King of Poland, died leaving his brother Alexander Jagiellon, Grand Duke of Lithuania, the strongest candidate for the Polish throne. Alexander became preoccupied with the succession. To counter religious accusations, Alexander attempted to establish a church union between Catholics and Orthodox as it was envisioned at the Council of Florence – the Orthodox would retain their traditions but would accept the pope as their spiritual sovereign. The Metropolitan of Kiev and all Rus' agreed to such an arrangement, but Helena protested. Polish nobles, including Bishop Erazm Ciołek and Cardinal Frederick Jagiellon, discussed the issue of royal divorce.

In the meantime, the war continued, just not as successfully for Moscow. As Lithuanian forces arrived in the region, the Muscovite forces had to move slowly. Additionally, the Livonian Order, led by Wolter von Plettenberg, joined the war as a Lithuanian ally. The Livonian troops won the Battle of the Siritsa River in August 1501, besieged Pskov, and won the Battle of Lake Smolino in September 1502. In 1502, Ivan III organized a campaign to capture Smolensk, but the city withstood the siege as Muscovites chose a poor strategy and had insufficient artillery. Peace negotiations began in mid-1502. Alexander asked Vladislaus II of Hungary to act as the mediator, and a six-year truce was concluded on the Feast of the Annunciation (March 25) in 1503. The Grand Duchy of Lithuania lost approximately 210,000 square kilometres (81,000 sq mi), or a third of its territory: Chernigov, Novgorod-Seversk, Starodub, and lands around the upper Oka River. Russian historian Matvei Kuzmich Liubavskii counted Lithuanian losses at 70 volosts, 22 towns, and 13 villages. The Lithuanians also acknowledged Ivan's title, sovereign of all Russia.

Historian Edvardas Gudavičius said: "The war of 1492–1494 was a kind of reconnaissance mission conducted by the united Russia. [The terms of] the ceasefire of 1503 showed the planned political aggression of Russia, its undoubted military superiority. The concept of the sovereign of all Russia, put forward by Ivan III, did not leave room for the existence of the Lithuanian state".

During the Muscovite–Lithuanian War of 1503, the Crimean Tatar armies pillaged Lithuania's southern towns of Slutsk, Kletsk, and Nyasvizh and even threatened the capital city of Vilnius. Alexander Jagiellon then ordered the construction of a defensive wall around his capital, which was completed in 1522.

== Third war (1507–1508) ==
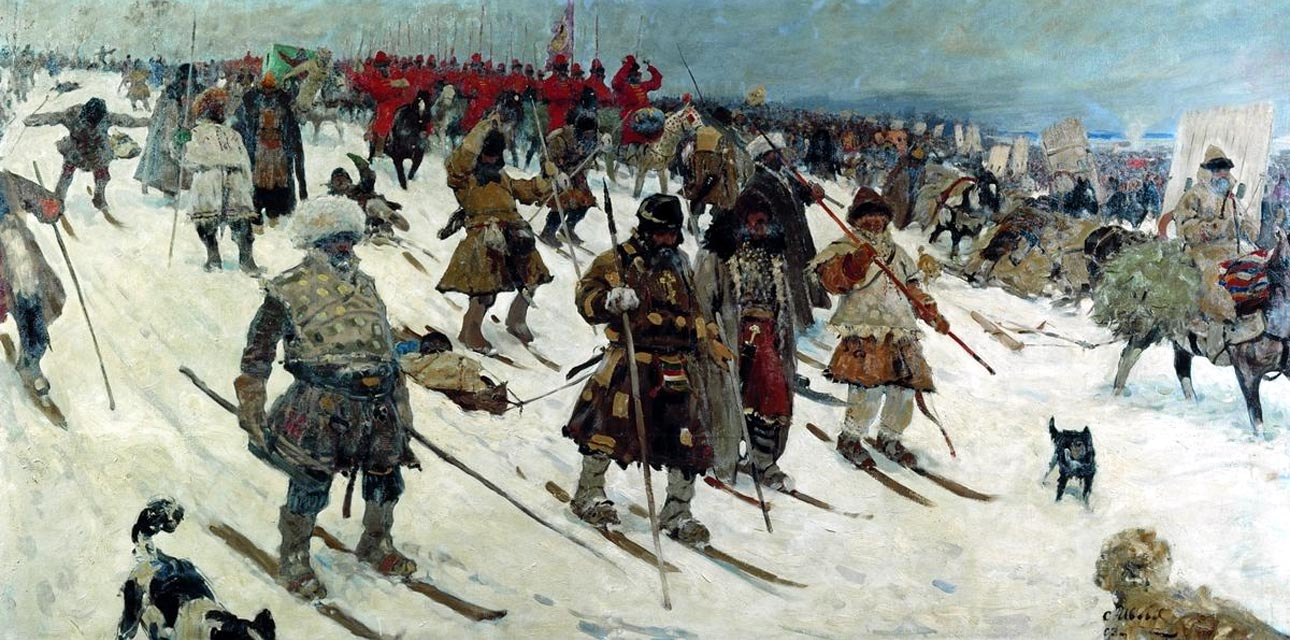
Muscovite campaign against the Lithuanians by Sergei Ivanov (1903)

In 1506, Alexander died. Vasili III, who succeeded his father Ivan III in 1505, advanced his bid for the Polish throne, but Polish nobles chose Sigismund I the Old, who was crowned both as King of Poland and Grand Duke of Lithuania. In 1507, Sigismund I sent envoys to Moscow to request the return of the territories acquired by the 1503 truce. At the same time, Khan Meñli I Giray broke off his alliance with Moscow due to its campaign against Kazan. Sigismund I received a yarlıq for the Muscovite territories of Novgorod, Pskov, and Ryazan.

The war was intertwined with a rebellion by Michael Glinski, Court Marshal of Lithuania, a favorite of Alexander Jagiellon and a man of opportunity. When Sigismund I the Old succeeded Alexander in 1506, he did not show the same favors to Glinski. Jan Zabrzeziński, Voivode of Trakai and Glinki's old political opponent, accused Glinski of treason – he alleged that Glinski poisoned Grand Duke Alexander and had ambitions of becoming king himself. Glinski then organized a rebellion, murdered Zabrzeziński in February 1508, and declared himself the defender of the Orthodox faith (even though he was a Catholic of Mongol descent). His followers unsuccessfully attacked the Kaunas Castle in an attempt to liberate the prisoner Ahmad, Khan of the Great Horde. Glinski then established himself in Turov and contacted Vasili III. Glinski started retreating towards Moscow and attempted to capture Minsk, Slutsk, Mstsislaw, and Krychaw. He only managed to take Mazyr when his relative opened the gates. Near Orsha, he joined with Muscovite forces but was defeated by Grand Hetman of Lithuania Konstanty Ostrogski. This series of defeats demonstrated the rebellion, despite its claims to protect the rights of the Orthodox, was not supported by the general population and did not spread. The war eventually ended with the inconclusive 'eternal peace treaty' on October 8, 1508, which maintained the territorial accords of the 1503 truce.

== Fourth war (1512–1522) ==
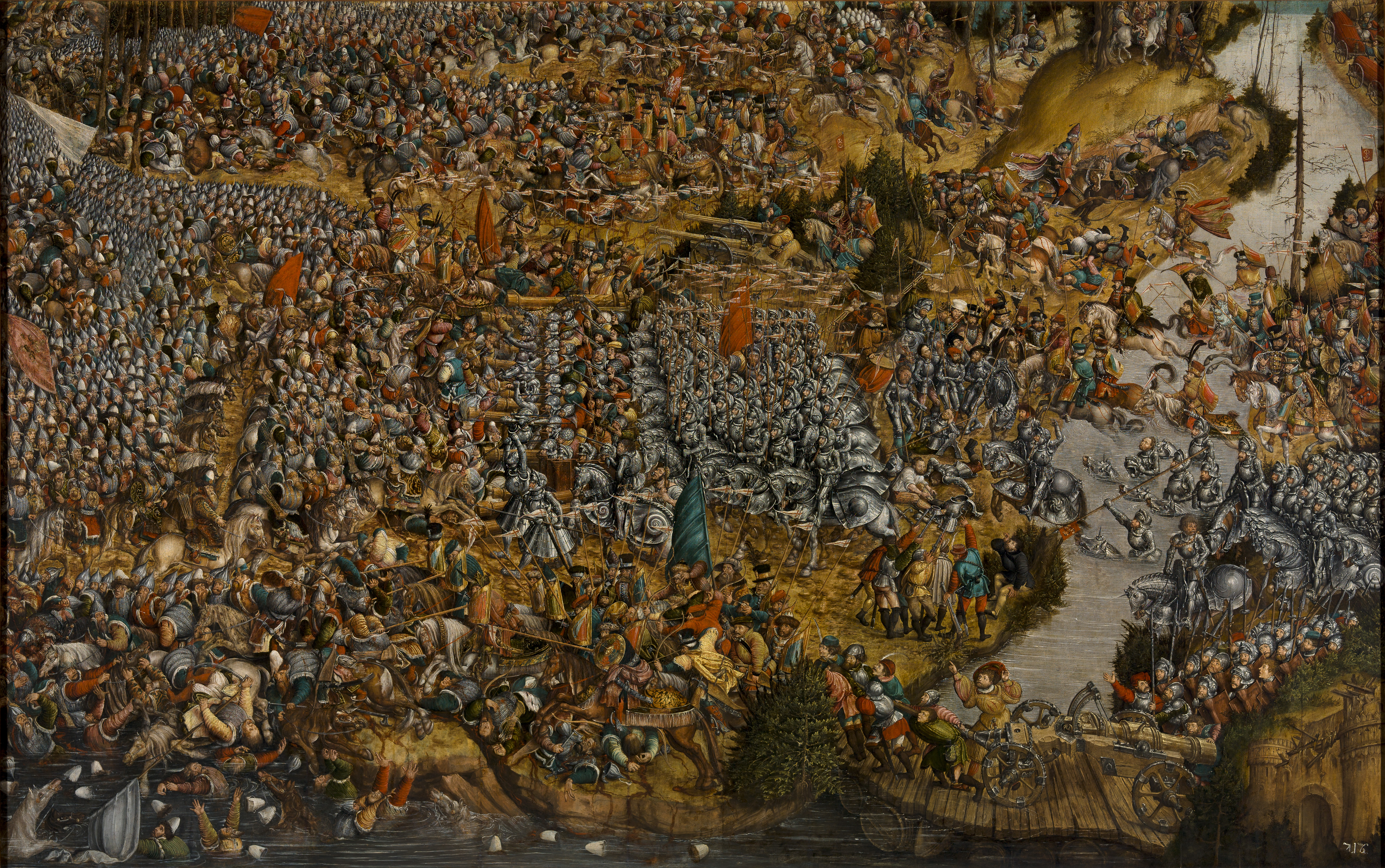
Battle of Orsha in 1514

Despite the peace treaty, the relationship between the two countries remained tense. Sigismund I demanded Michael Glinski's extradition for trial, while Vasili III demanded better treatment of his widowed sister Helena. Vasili also discovered that Sigismund was paying Khan Meñli I Giray to attack the Grand Duchy of Moscow. At the same time, Albert of Prussia became the Grand Master of the Teutonic Order and was unwilling to acknowledge Poland's suzerainty as required by the Second Peace of Thorn (1466). The tension eventually resulted in the Polish–Teutonic War (1519–1521) and allied Maximilian I, Holy Roman Emperor with Vasili III.

In December 1512, Moscow invaded the Grand Duchy of Lithuania seeking to capture Smolensk, a major trading center. Their first six- and four-week sieges in 1513 failed, but the city fell in July 1514. Prince Vasily Nemoy Shuysky was left as viceregent in Smolensk. This angered Glinski, who threatened to rejoin Sigismund I but was imprisoned by the Russians.

Russia then suffered a series of defeats in the field. In 1512, Grand Hetman of Lithuania, Konstanty Ostrogski, ravaged Severia and defeated a 6,000-strong Russian force. On 8 September 1514, the Russians suffered a major defeat at the Battle of Orsha. Despite their victory, his army was unable to move quickly enough to recapture Smolensk. Then the Lithuanians and Poles made an unsuccessful attempt to take the Opochka fortress and suffered a serious defeat. In 1518, Russian forces were beaten during the siege of Polotsk, when according to legend the Lithuanian forces were inspired by the sight of their patron saint, Saint Casimir. The Russians invaded Lithuania again in 1519, raiding Orsha, Mogilev, Minsk, Vitebsk, and Polotsk.

By 1521, Sigismund had defeated the Grand Master and allied with the Kazan and Crimean Tatar hordes against Moscow. Khan of Crimea, Mehmed I Giray carried out a ruinous attack on the Moscow principality. The Lithuanian troops led by Dashkovich participated in the attack and tried to take Ryazan.

In 1522, a treaty was signed that called for a five-year truce, no prisoner exchange, and for Russia to retain control of Smolensk. The truce was subsequently extended to 1534.

== Fifth or Starodub war (1534–1537) ==
Upon Vasily's death in 1533, his son and heir, Ivan IV, was only three years old. His mother, Elena Glinskaya, acted as the regent and engaged in power struggles with other relatives and boyars. The Polish–Lithuanian monarch decided to take advantage of the situation and demanded the return of territories conquered by Vasily III. In the summer of 1534, Grand Hetman Jerzy Radziwiłł and the Tatars devastated the area around Chernigov, Novgorod Seversk, Radogoshch, Starodub, and Briansk. In October 1534, a Muscovite army under the command of Prince Ovchina-Telepnev-Obolensky, Prince Nikita Obolensky, and Prince Vasily Shuisky invaded Lithuania, advancing as far as Vilnius and Naugardukas, and built a fortress on Lake Sebezh the following year, before being stopped. The Lithuanian army under Hetman Radziwill, Andrei Nemirovich, Polish Hetman Jan Tarnowski, and Semen Belsky launched a powerful counterattack and took Gomel and Starodub.

In 1536, the fortress Sebezh defeated Nemirovich's Lithuanian forces when they tried to besiege it, and then the Muscovites attacked Liubech, razed Vitebsk, and built fortresses at Velizh and Zavoloche. Lithuania and Russia negotiated a five-year truce, without prisoner exchange, in which Homel stayed under the king's control, while Moscow kept Sebezh and Zavoloche.

Territorial changes of the Grand Duchy of Lithuania from 1430 to 1583
Year	Area (approximate)	Explanation
1427	930,000 km^{2} (360,000 sq mi)	Largest extent
1438	Lost 21,000 km^{2} (8,100 sq mi)	Lost western Podolia to Poland during the Lithuanian Civil War
1485	Lost 88,000 km^{2} (34,000 sq mi)	Lost Yedisan to the Crimean Khanate
1494	Lost 87,000 km^{2} (34,000 sq mi)	First war with Russia
1503	Lost 210,000 km^{2} (81,000 sq mi)	Second war with Russia
1522	Lost 56,000 km^{2} (22,000 sq mi)	Fourth war with Russia; included Smolensk
1537	Gained 20,000 km^{2} (7,700 sq mi)	Fifth war with Russia
1561	Gained 85,000 km^{2} (33,000 sq mi)	Gained Duchy of Livonia by the Treaty of Vilnius (1561)
1569	Lost 170,000 km^{2} (66,000 sq mi)	Transferred Ukrainian territories to Poland by the Union of Lublin
1582	Lost 40,000 km^{2} (15,000 sq mi)	Livonian War
1583	365,000 km^{2} (141,000 sq mi)	Territory after the Livonian War

== Livonian War ==
In 1547, the Tsardom of Russia was officially proclaimed when Ivan IV was crowned as tsar of all Russia. The tsar sought to gather the ethnically Ruthenian lands of the former Kievan Rus', engaging with other powers around the Baltic Sea in the Livonian War.

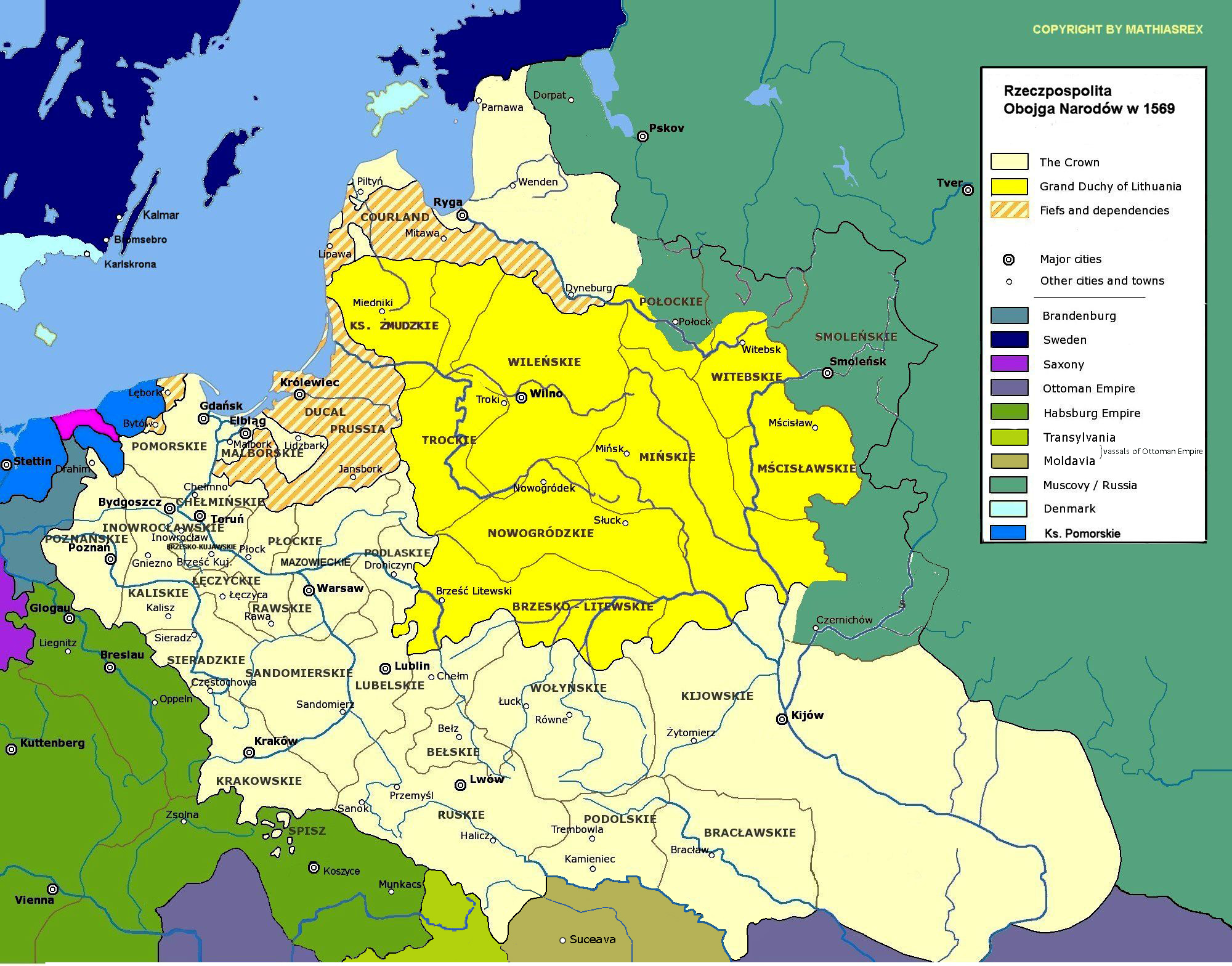
Polish–Lithuanian Commonwealth in 1569

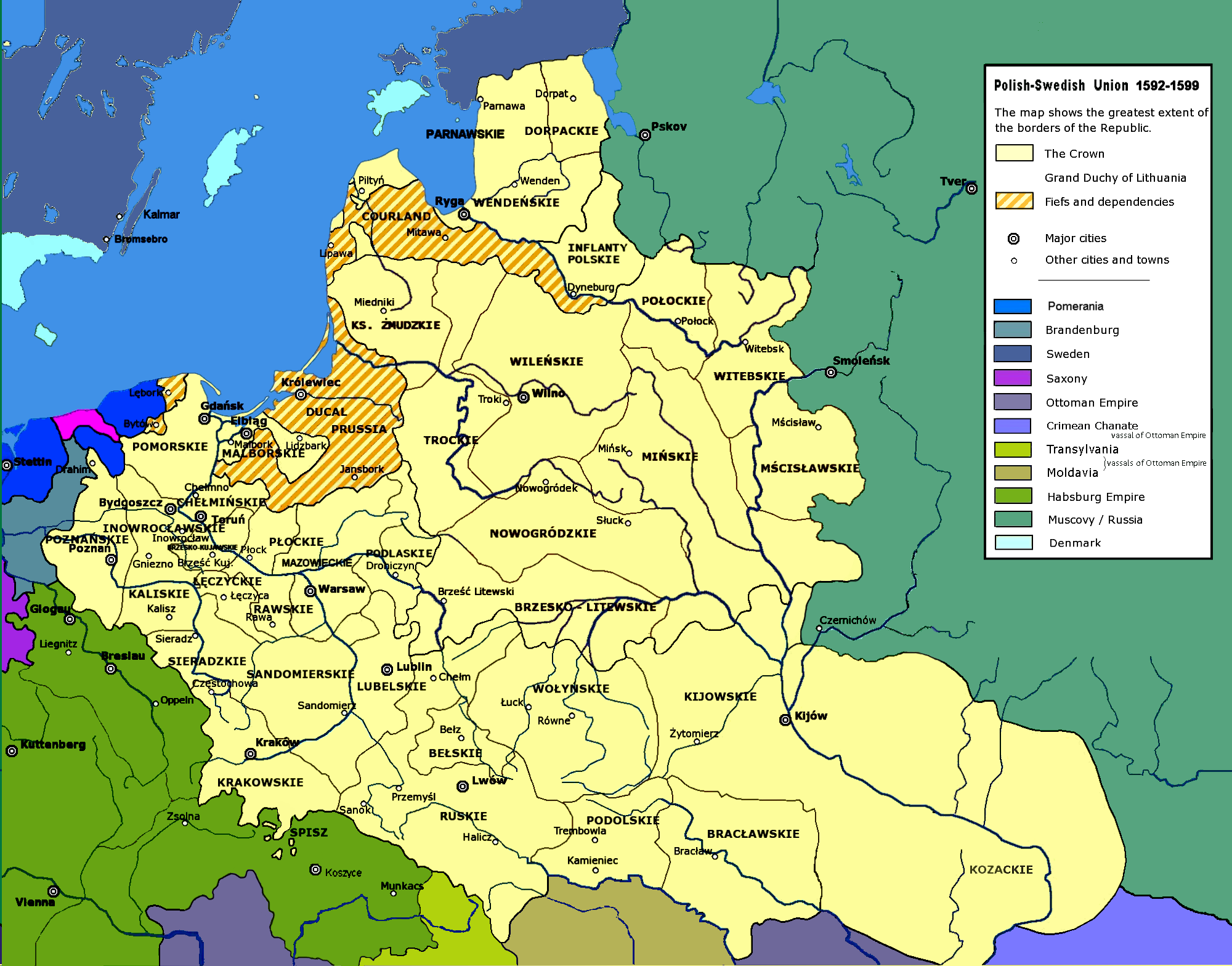
Polish–Lithuanian Commonwealth in the 1590s

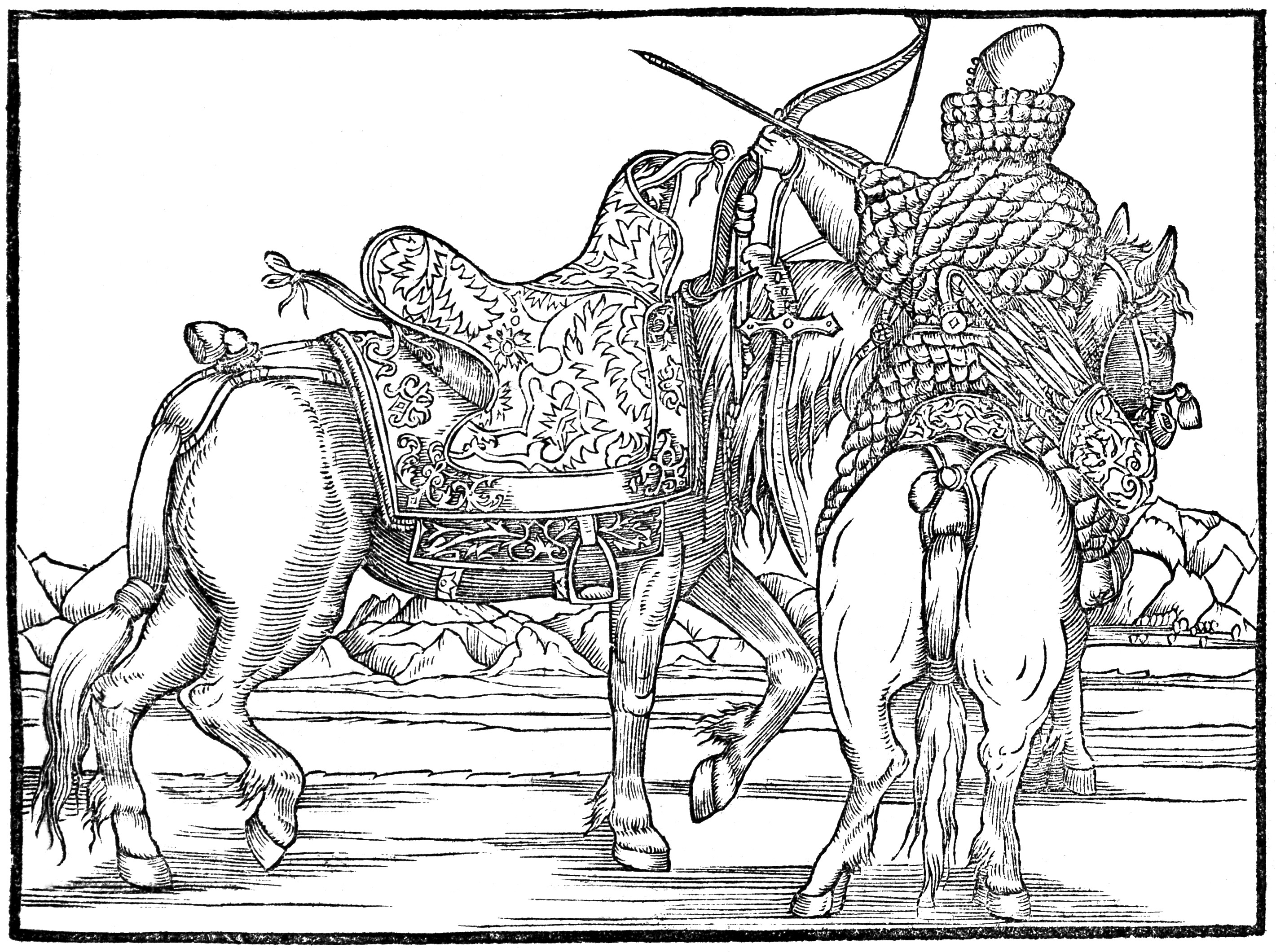
Mounted archer

During the reign of Sigismund II Augustus in Poland and Lithuania, Tsar Ivan IV invaded Livonia, first in 1558 when the Livonian Knights sought an alliance with Poland and Lithuania; the Poles and Lithuanians were able to defend only southern Livonia. Lithuania and Poland were initially allied with Denmark and fought against the Tsardom of Russia allied with Sweden; after several years the coalitions changed and Poland–Lithuania allied themselves with Sweden against Russia and Denmark. Eventually, the 1570 ceasefire divided Livonia between the participants, with Lithuania controlling Riga and Russians expanding access to the Baltic Sea by taking hold of Narva.

The Lithuanians felt increasingly pressured by the Tsar; furthermore, Lithuanian lesser nobility pressured the Grand Duke and magnates for gaining the same rights as Polish nobility (szlachta), i.e. the Golden Freedoms. Eventually, in 1569, after Sigismund II Augustus transferred significant territories of the Grand Duchy to Poland and after months of hard negotiations, Lithuanians partially accepted Polish demands and entered in alliance with the Union of Lublin, forming the Polish–Lithuanian Commonwealth. In the next phase of the conflict, in 1577, Ivan IV took advantage of the Commonwealth's internal strife (called the war against Danzig in Polish historiography), and, during the reign of Stefan Batory in Polish–Lithuanian Commonwealth, invaded Livonia, quickly taking almost the entire territory, except for Riga and Reval (now Tallinn). That war would last from 1577 to 1582.

Stefan Batory replied with a series of three offensives against Russia, trying to cut off Livonia from the main Russian territories. During his first offensive in 1579 with 22,000 men, he retook Polatsk; Polish–Lithuanian troops also devastated Smolensk region, and Severia up to Starodoub.. During the second, in 1580, with a 29,000-strong army, Stefan Batory took Velizh, Usvyat, Velikiye Luki. In 1581 the Lithuanians burnt down Staraya Russa, and with a 100,000-strong army Stefan Batory started the Siege of Pskov but failed to take the fortress. The prolonged and inconclusive siege led to negotiations, which with the aid of papal legate Antonio Possevino ended in the peace of Jam Zapolski in which the Tsar renounced his claims to Livonia and Polotsk but conceded no core Russian territories. The peace lasted for a quarter of a century, until the Commonwealth's forces invaded Russia in 1605.

=== Gallery ===
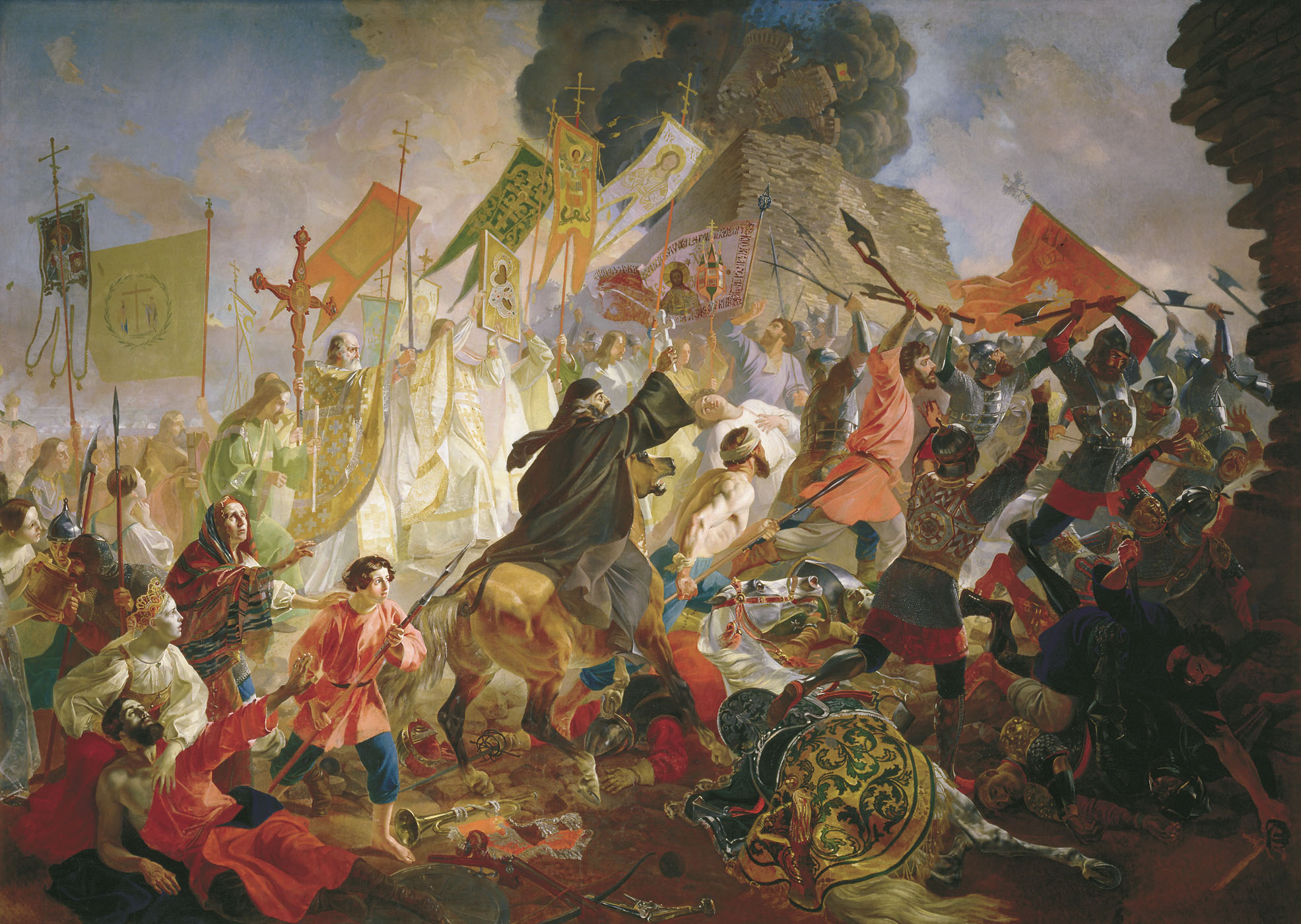
Siege of Pskov, painting by Karl Brullov, depicts the siege from the Russian perspective – terrified running Poles and Lithuanians, and heroic Russian defenders under the Orthodox Christian religious banners.

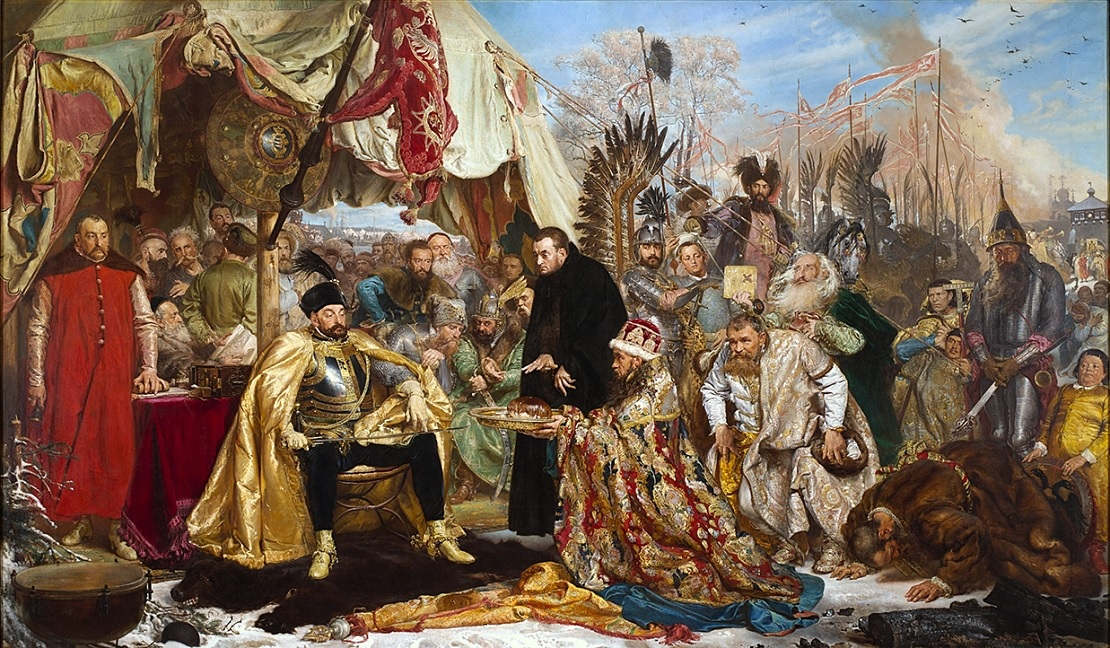
Batory at Pskov, painting by Jan Matejko, depicts the siege from the Polish–Lithuanian perspective – Russian nobility doing homage before the victorious Commonwealth ruler. In reality, Pskov was not taken by the Commonwealth as the Peace of Jam Zapolski was concluded before the siege ended.
