= Jasper Linde =

Catholic archbishop of Riga (died 1524)

- Gaspar Lindius, Casparus Linde
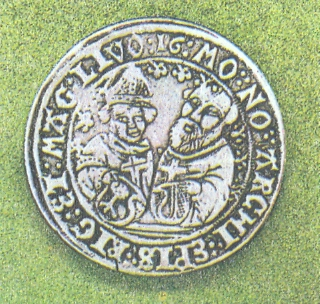
- Images of Jasper Linde (left) and Wolter von Plettenberg on a mark coin (1516)
- Died: June 29, 1524; Rauna, Archbishopric of Riga (now part of Latvia)

Jasper Linde, also known as Kaspars Linde in Latvian, (Latin: Gaspar Lindius, Casparus Linde, died in 1524), was Archbishop of Riga from February 18, 1509 to June 29, 1524. He went down in history as a prudent and thrifty ruler, who fortified his main castles in Koknese, Rauna, and built a new fortress on an island in Lake Viļaka near the Russian border. He also improved the methods of training rural priests to address major shortcomings in the religious life of the peasantry.

== Biography ==
Born in Westphalia (Northern Germany), he earned a master’s degree. In 1491, he became a canon of Riga. In 1497, he was elected dean of the cathedral chapter. In 1509, the chapter elected him archbishop, a decision confirmed by the Pope in Rome. Immediately afterward, he began organizing his lands and strengthening their defenses.

At the site of the Marienhausen Monastery (Viļaka), he built a strong stone castle on the lake island for defense against the Russians. He also reinforced Koknese and Rauna castles. In 1513, he ordered a printed prayer book for the priests of his churches.

He died in 1524 at his residence in Rauna Castle and was buried in Riga Cathedral.

== Documents ==
From the Rusov's Chronicle of Livonia:

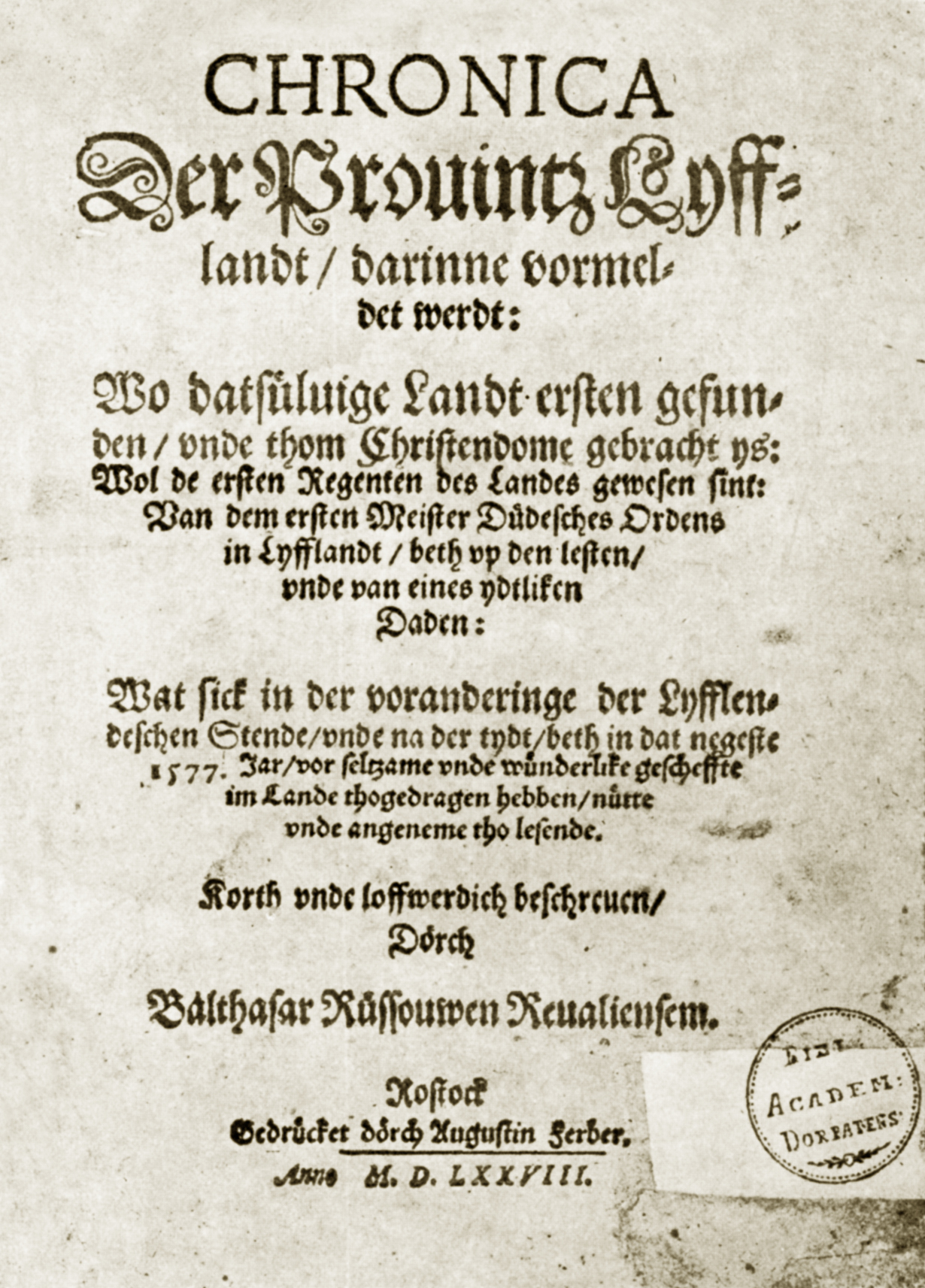

"Wolter von Plettenberg, the 41st Master of the Teutonic Order, was elected in 1495. [..] During Plettenberg’s time, the following successively served as Archbishops of Riga: Michael Hildebrand, son of a Reval citizen, Jasper Linde, Johann Blankenfeld, Thomas Schöning, son of a Riga burgomaster, and finally Wilhelm of Brandenburg, who was the 19th and last Archbishop of Riga during the Order's era."
