= Schoning =

Schöning or Schoening is a surname. Notable people with the surname include:

- Bill Schoening, American radio sportscaster
- Chevalier Schoening, a pseudonym of a European courtier
- Gerhard Schöning (1722–1780), Norwegian historian
- Hans Adam von Schöning (1641–1696), Prussian General Field Marshal
- Jacob Marius Schøning (1856–1934), Norwegian Minister of Trade
- Johann Schöning (1458–1502), mayor of the Hanseatic city of Riga
- Kurd von Schöning (1789–1859), Prussian major general and military historian
- Louise Eleonore von Schöning (1708–1784), Prussian noblewoman
- Pete Schoening (1927–2004), American mountain climber
- Thomas Schöning (died 1539), Archbishop of Riga
- Uwe Schöning (born 1955), German computer scientist
- Wilhelm Schöning (1908–1987), German commander during World War II
