= Lithuanian–Muscovite War (1507–1508) =

1507-1508 war part of the Muscovite-Lithuanian Wars

Lithuanian-Muscovite War (1507-1508)
- Part of Muscovite-Lithuanian Wars
Date	1507–1508
Location	Eastern part of Grand Duchy of Lithuania
Result	Disputed
Territorial changes	Principality of Moscow gives Liubech and six border counties to the Grand Duchy of Lithuania; Lithuania renounces claims to lost territories as a result Lithuanian-Muscovite War (1500-1503)

Belligerents
Grand Duchy of Lithuania; Kingdom of Poland	Principality of Moscow

Commanders and leaders
Sigismund I the Old; Konstanty Ostrogski; Albertas Goštautas; Stanislaw Kiszka; Mikołaj Firlej	Vasili III of Russia; Daniil Shchenya; Yakov Zakharyevich Koshkin-Zakharyin

Lithuanian-Muscovite War (1507-1508) also known as the Third Lithuanian-Muscovite War was a war between the Grand Duchy of Lithuania supported by the Kingdom of Poland against the Principality of Moscow.

== 1507 Campaign ==
On February 2, 1507, the Sejm of the Grand Duchy of Lithuania passed a resolution on its readiness to declare war on the Principality of Moscow. Casus belli was the Russians' rejection of the Lithuanian ultimatum, calling on Moscow to return all Lithuanian lands captured after 1494. Lithuanian troops carried out three concentrations: one in Smolensk under the command of Albertas Goštautas, another in Polotsk commanded by Stanisław Hlebowicz and the third one in Minsk under the command of the Grand Hetman of Lithuania Stanisław Kiszka.

In April 1507, Muscovite troops attacked the Grand Duchy of Lithuania, but quickly retreated when King Sigismund I the Old carried out an offensive attack, crossing the Berezina river at the front of his troops. In August, Grand Hetman of Lithuania Stanisław Kiszka gathered his troops in the camp near Drutsk. At the same time, the Crimean Tatars of Khan Meñli I Giray, allied with the Grand Duchy of Lithuania, attacked the Principality of Moscow. In October, the Grand Duke of Moscow, Vasili III of Russia, repelled the Tatar attack and attacked the Lithuanian fortresses of Mstsislaw and Krychaw. However, he did not capture these fortresses, threatened by the army of Stanisław Kiszka. In September, Grand Hetman Konstanty Ostrogski of Lithuania escaped from Russian captivity and his command of the Polish-Lithuanian army was restored.

== 1508 Campaign ==
During the 1508 campaign, Lithuanian Court marshal Michael Glinski switched to the side of the Principality of Moscow and unsuccessfully tried to start an uprising against the Grand Duchy of Lithuania in Belarus. Muscovite troops besieged Minsk, Orsha and Slutsk. On July 18, the Russians were forced to stop their siege, threatened by the Polish-Lithuanian troops led by Ostrogski and Mikołaj Firlej, who on July 13, 1508, defeated the Muscovite army in the Battle of Orsha. Ostrogski managed to retake Smolensk. At the beginning of August, peace negotiations began, which Sigismund I wanted to support with an armed demonstration. Stanisław Kiszka, at the head of several thousand Polish-Lithuanian cavalry, attacked far into the Muscovite lands. He advanced towards Moscow, capturing Dorogobuzh, Vyazma, Toropets and Biela, approaching Rzhev and Mozhaysk.

== Peace ==
On October 8, 1508, perpetual peace was concluded in Moscow. According to it, Gliński returned all his occupied towns, Russia renounced Liubech (and therefore access to the Dnieper) and ceded six border counties. Lithuania, in turn, recognized all Russian conquests during the previous war, including Chernihiv.

== See also ==
- Muscovite–Lithuanian Wars
