= Rauna Castle =

Ruined castle in Latvia

- Raunas pilsdrupas
- Rauna, Rauna Parish, Smiltene Municipality in Latvia
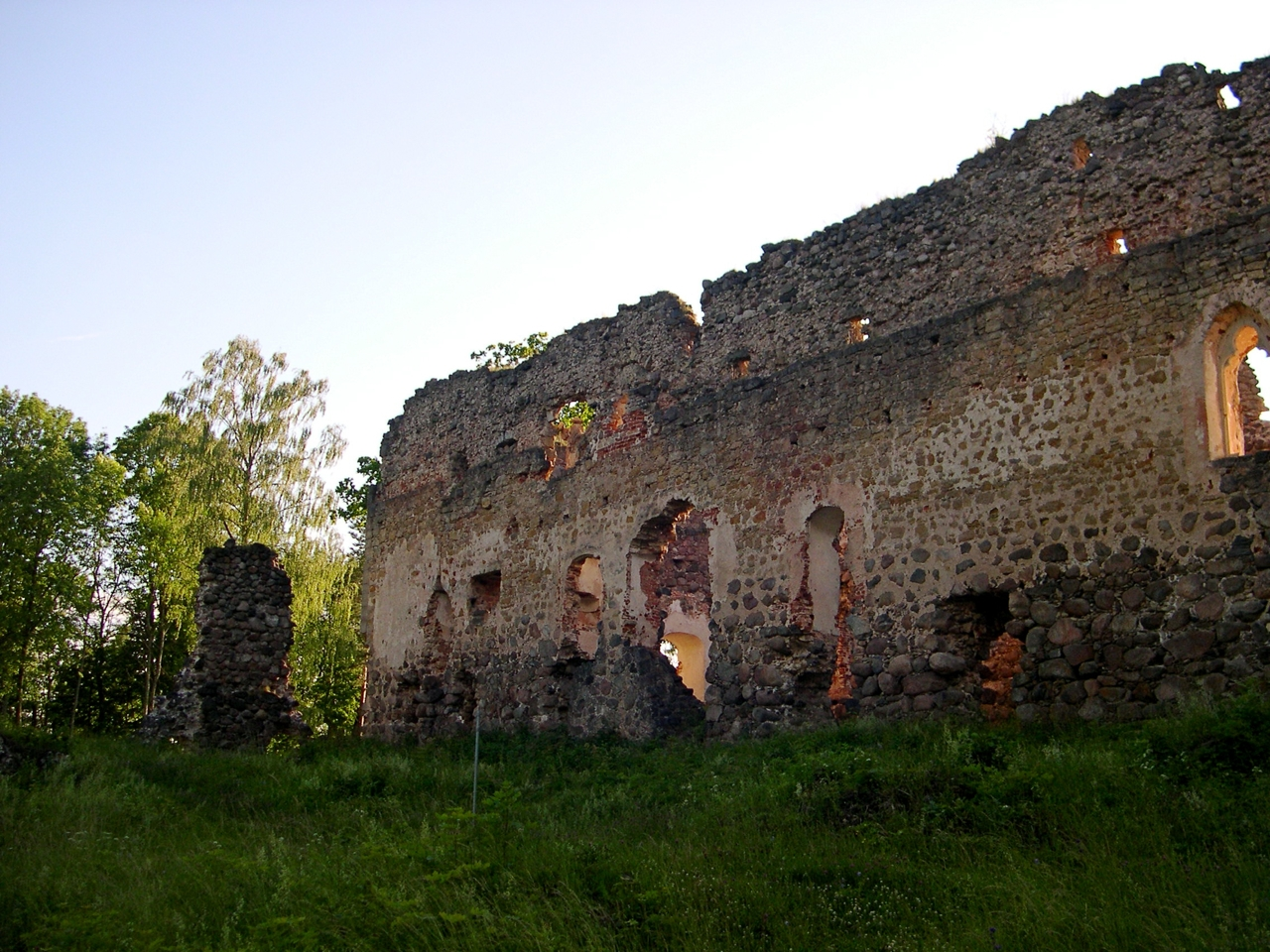

Site information
- Type: Castle
- Open to the public: yes
- Condition: Ruined

Location
- Coordinates: 57.330479°N 25.61165°E

Site history
- Built: 1262
- Built by: Archbishopric of Riga
- Fate: Demolished 1683

Rauna Castle (Swedish: Rönneburg, German: Rownenborgh, Ronneburg) ruins are located in the village of Rauna in Rauna Parish, Smiltene Municipality, in the Vidzeme region of Latvia. The castle was the principal residence of the Archbishopric of Riga, and was visited each year by the Archbishop and his entourage. During the 16th century, it was greatly expanded and a settlement developed around the castle. It was first demolished in the 17th century, but the towers and parts of the castle still remain.

== History ==
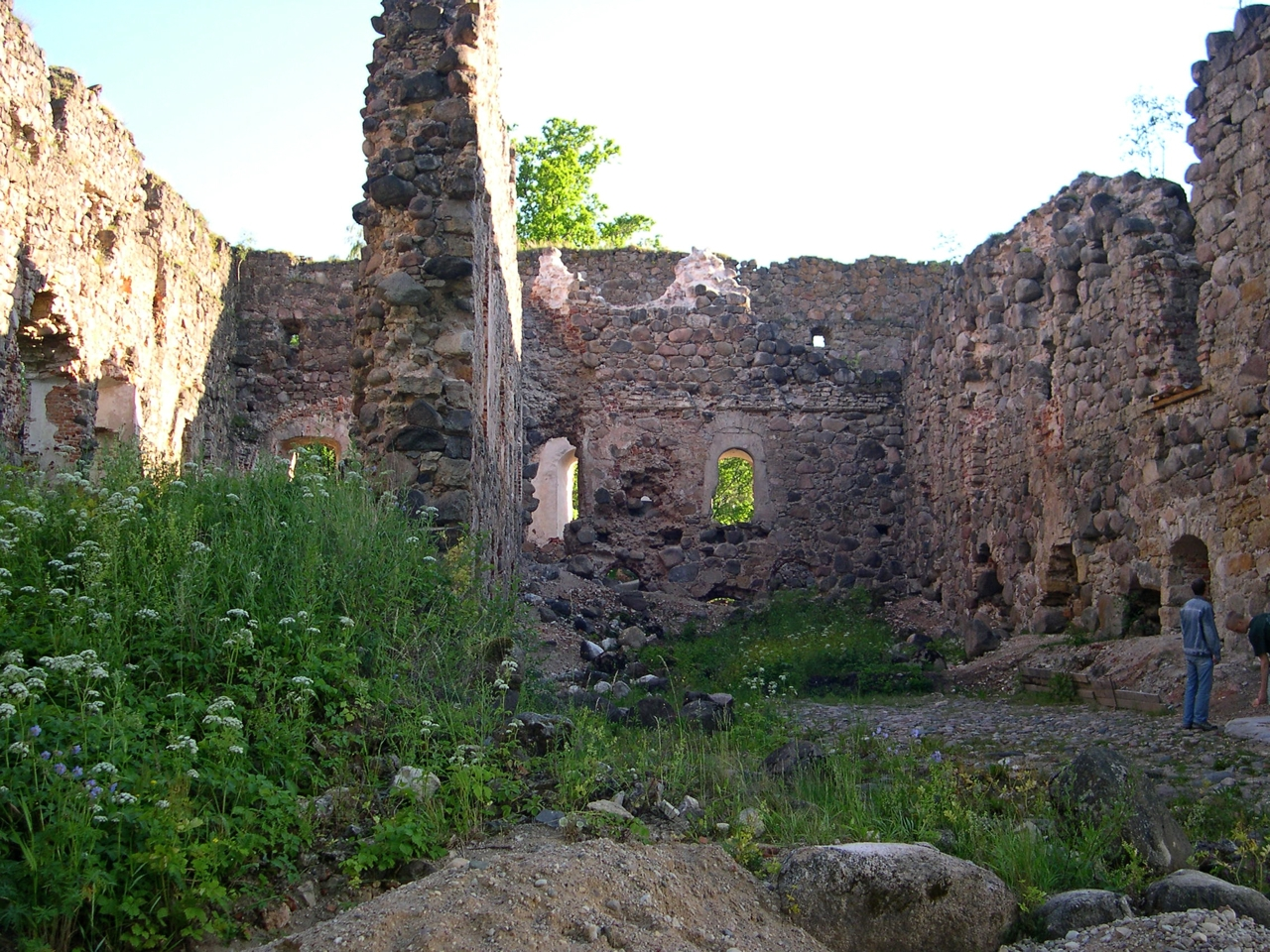
Rauna Castle in 2008

The first mention of Rauna Castle dates back to 1381, although historians agree that it may have been built here even earlier. Eighteenth-century sources mention the castle as being erected in 1262, following a proposal of Albert Suerbeer, Archbishop of Riga. It is noted that the castle was one of the most important centers of the archdiocese.

The biggest reconstructions occurred under the reign of Archbishop Jasper Linde. One of the new towers built was named Garais Kaspars (Tall Jasper), after the archbishop, and a small settlement developed around the castle, which later became the village of Rauna.

The devastation of the castle started in 1556 with attacks by the Livonian Order, which lasted until the end of the Livonian War. The worst damage to the castle occurred from 1657 to 1658, during the Second Northern War between the Polish–Lithuanian Commonwealth and the Swedish Empire. The castle was deserted after that and slowly turned to ruins. In 1683, the king of Sweden ordered the destruction of anything that resembled a fortress around the castle, so all towers were demolished. Today, the Rauna Castle ruins are preserved. Many walls and even the bases of the towers remain.

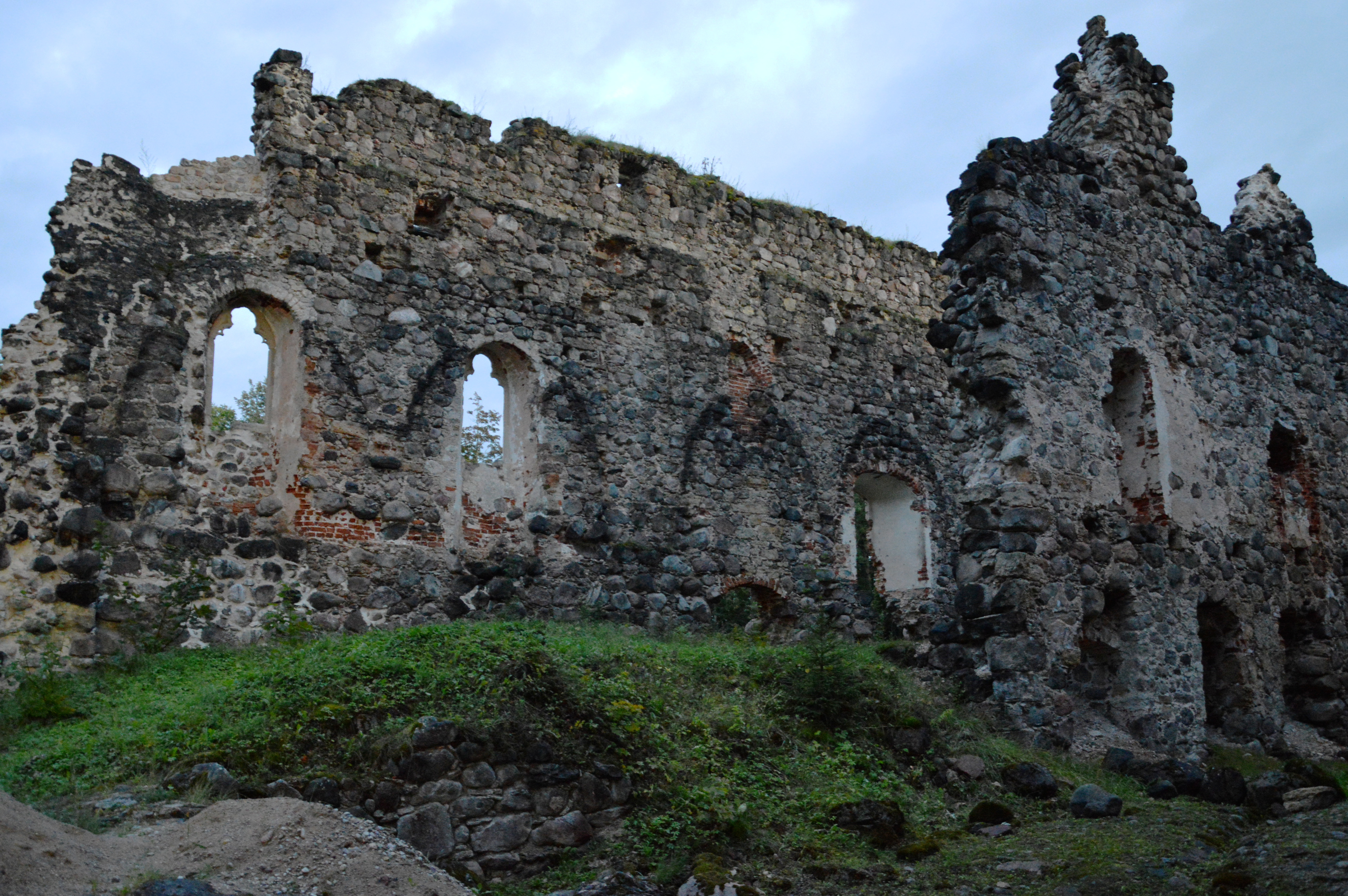
Rauna Castle in 2013

== See also ==
- List of castles in Latvia
