= Wilhelm Hohenzollern =

Wilhelm Hohenzollern may refer to:

- Wilhelm I, German Emperor (1797–1888), King of Prussia and the first German Emperor
- Wilhelm II, German Emperor (1859–1941), last German Emperor and King of Prussia
- Wilhelm, German Crown Prince (1882–1951), last German and Prussian Crown Prince
- Wilhelm von Brandenburg (1498–1563), Archbishop of Riga
