= Roman Catholic Diocese of Chiemsee =

Lost diocese of the roman Catholic Church

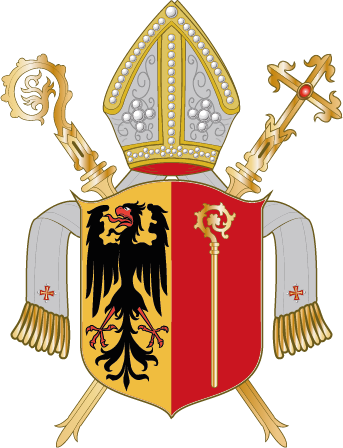
Bishopric of Chiemsee; Bistum Chiemsee
1216–1808
Coat of arms
Capital; Circle; Bench	Herrenchiemsee; Bavarian until ? none
Established	1216
Abolished	1808

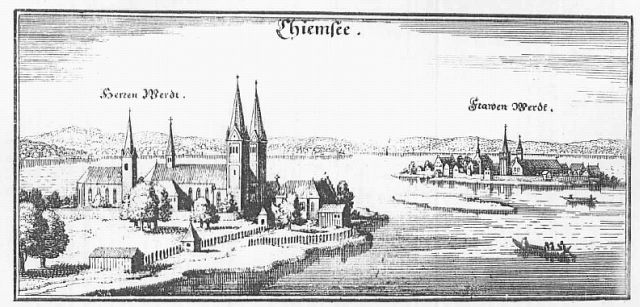
Herrenchiemsee (left); Engraving by Merian, c. 1644

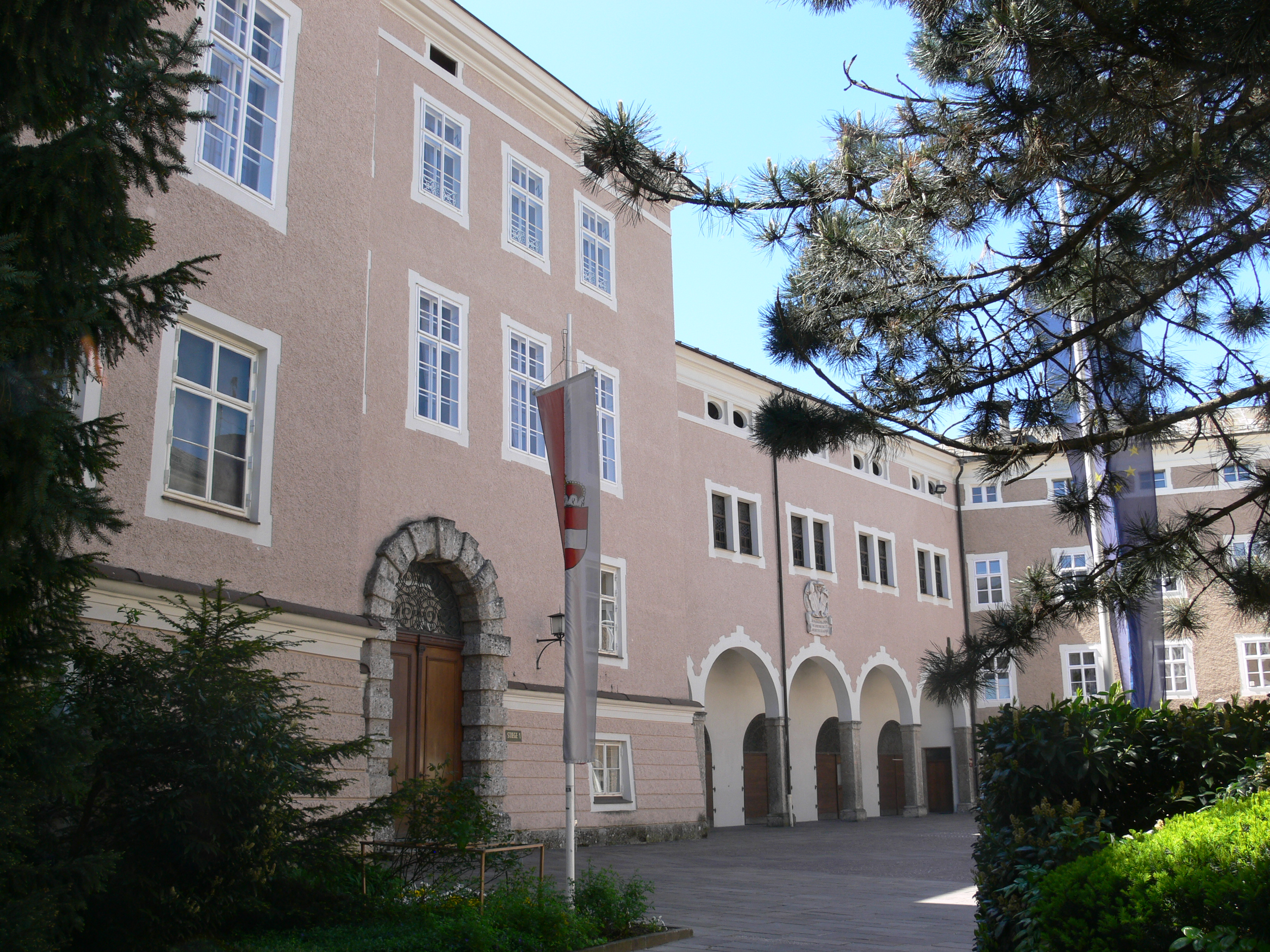
Chiemseehof, Salzburg

The Bishopric of Chiemsee was a Roman Catholic diocese. While based on the islands of the Chiemsee in Bavaria, Germany, most of its territory lay in the County of Tyrol, Austria. The bishopric ceased to be a residential see in 1808. and accordingly is today listed by the Catholic Church as a titular see.

== Establishment ==
The Bishopric of Chiemsee was established by the Archbishop of Salzburg, Eberhard II of Regensberg, on the islands of the Chiemsee in 1215. It followed the precedent set by his predecessor Gebhard, who had established the Bishopric of Gurk in 1072. This system of founding quite small suffragan dioceses was to be completed by the setting up of the bishoprics of Seckau in 1218 and Lavant in 1225. It was caused by the fact, that, after a large increase in size, stretching its borders from the Inn river in Bavaria to the Hungarian border, the archdiocese of Salzburg became hard to govern. Both the Holy Roman Emperor and the Pope gave their consent and support to the establishment of the bishopric in 1213.

== Structure ==
All bishops of Chiemsee were selected by the Archbishops, for the bishops were the most important supporters of the archbishops. The bishops usually served as auxiliary bishops or fulfilled other duties for the archbishops. Locally the ruling of the bishopric rested mostly with the archdeacons who, supported by the Dukes of Bavaria, prevented the bishops from residing in the bishopric. Therefore, the Bishops never became prince-bishops of the Empire, unlike most other ecclesiarchs. Thus the bishopric should not be considered as a state of the Holy Roman Empire, but as a territory within the state of the archbishopric. Accordingly, the bishops held a seat in the archbishoprics diet.

At first, the nuns monastery of Frauenchiemsee was to be the seat of the bishopric, but subsequently, the monks monastery church of the nearby Benedictine Abbey of Herrenchiemsee was chosen to be the diocesan cathedral. In fact, the seat of the bishopric was the so-called Chiemseehof in the city of Salzburg. This building nowadays is used by the parliament and the government of the State of Salzburg.

The bishopric was rather small, consisting of 10 parishes when it was created, and finally 11 in 1804, mostly consisting of exclaves in the vicinity of St. Johann in Tirol.

The best known bishop was Berthold Pürstinger (1508 - 1525) who twice used his influence to save innocent people from (the town-councillors in 1511, and the peasants in 1524); after retiring from office became a noted humanist.

== Abolition ==
Together with the secularisation of the archbishopric in 1803, the bishopric also lost its territorial function. In 1808 the diocese was abolished after the last bishop waived his rights. Temporarily under the rule of the Ordinariate of the Bishopric of Freising, the Austrian parts returned to Salzburg and were added to the Bishopric of Brixen in 1817/18, the rest becoming a regular part of the newly renamed Archbishopric of Munich-Freising.

== List of Bishops of Chiemsee (1216 - 1808) ==
num	Name	Reign	Notes
1	Rudiger of Bergheim-Radeck	1216–1233	
2	Albert	1233–1252	
	vacant	1244–1246	
	Albert Suerbeer	1246–1247	Administrator; Archbishop of Riga, formerly Archbishop of Armagh
	Henry of Bilversheim	1247–1252	Administrator
3	Henry I	1252–1266	
4	Henry II, Bishop of Chiemsee	1266–1274	
5	John I of Ennstal	1274–1279	
6	Conrad I of Hintberg	1279–1292	
7	Frederick I of Fronau	1292–1293	
8	Albert of Bohnsdorf	1293–1322	
9	Ulrich I of Montpreis	1322–1330	
10	Conrad II of Liechtenstein	1330–1355	
11	Gerhoh of Waldeck	1356–1359	
12	Hugo of Schärfenberg	1359–1360	
13	Lodwig I Raidhofer	1360–1361	
14	Frederick II	1361–1387	
15	George I of Neuberg	1387–1395	
16	Eberhard of Berned	1395–1399	
17	Engelmar kröl	1399–1420	
18	Frederick III Theis of Thesingen	1421–1429	Bishop of Lavant
19	John II Ebser	1429–1438	
20	Sylvester Pflieger	1438–1453	
21	Ulrich II of Plankenfels	1453–1467	
22	Bernard of Kraiburg	1467–1477	
23	George II Altdorfer	1477–1495	
24	Lodwig II Ebmer	1495–1502	
25	Christoph I Mendel of Steinfels|	1502–1508	
26	Berthold Pürstinger	1508–1525	
27	Aegid Rehm	1525–1536	
28	Hieronymus Meittinger	1536–1557	
29	Christoph II Schlattl	1557–1589	
30	Sebastian Cattaneus	1589–1609	
31	Ernfried of Khünburg	1610–1619	
32	Nicholas of Wolkenstein	1619–1624	
33	Christopher III John of Liechtenstein	1624–1643	
34	Francis Vigil of Spaur	1644–1670	
35	Franz of Preysing	1670–1687	
36	Sigmund Ignatz of Wolkenstein	1687–1696	
37	Sigmund Carl of Castel-Barco	1696–1708	
38	John Sigmund Grag of Khünburg	1708–1711	Bishop of Lavant
39	Franz Adolph of Wagensberg	1712–1723	Bishop of Seckau
40	Carl Joseph of Khünburg	1724–1729	Bishop of Seckau
41	Joseph Francis Valerian of Arco	1730–1746	
42	Franz Carl of Friedberg and Trauchburg	1746–1772	
43	Ferdinand Christoph of Zeil and Trauchburg	1772–1786	
44	Franz Xavier of Breuner	1786–1797	
45	Sigmund Christoph of Zeil und Trauchburg	1797–1805	Archbishop of Salzburg
	vacant	1805–1808	
