= Riga Town Council =

Municipal and judicial institution of Riga from 1226 to 1889

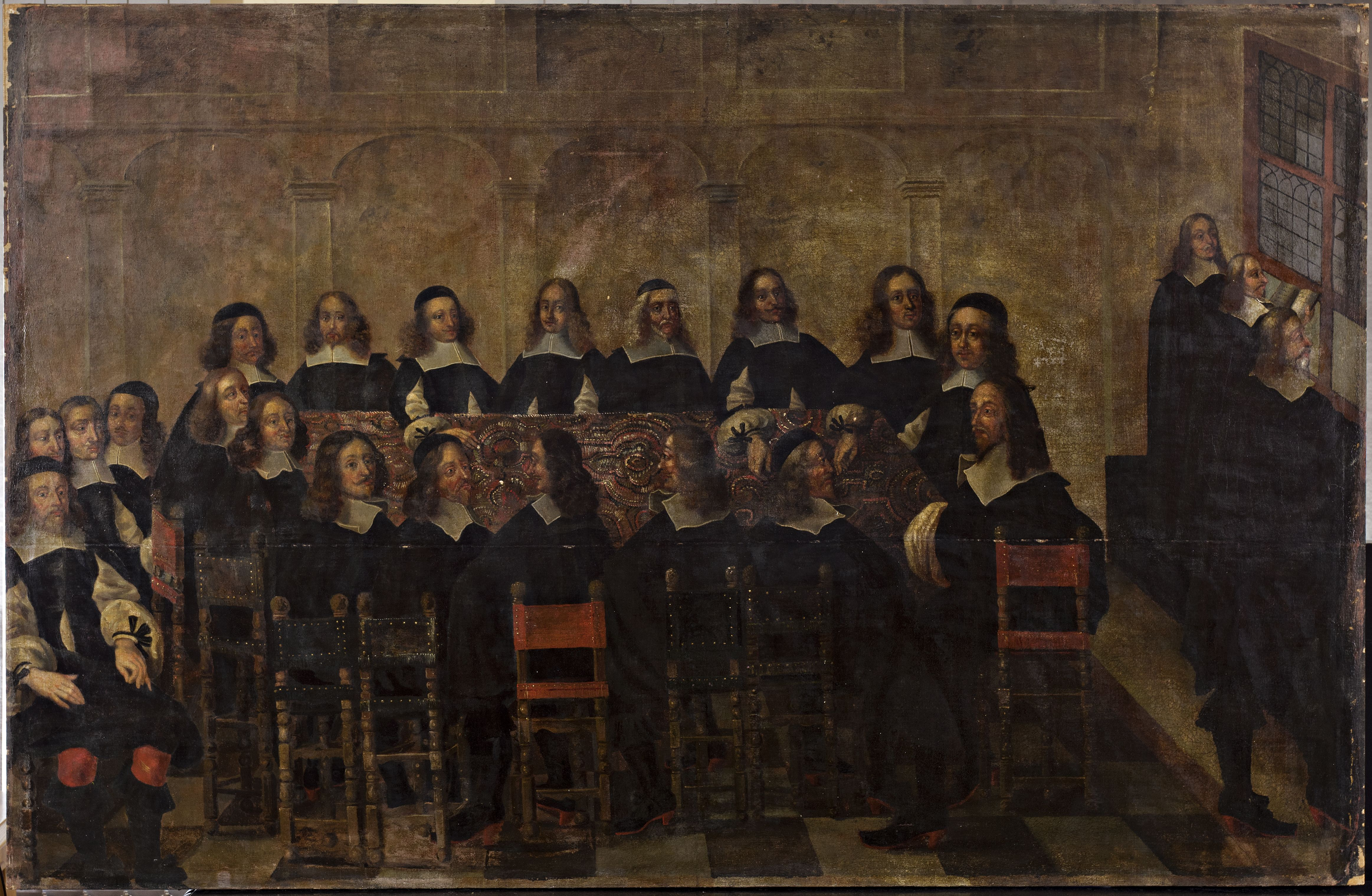
Meeting of the Riga Town Council in the mid-17th century

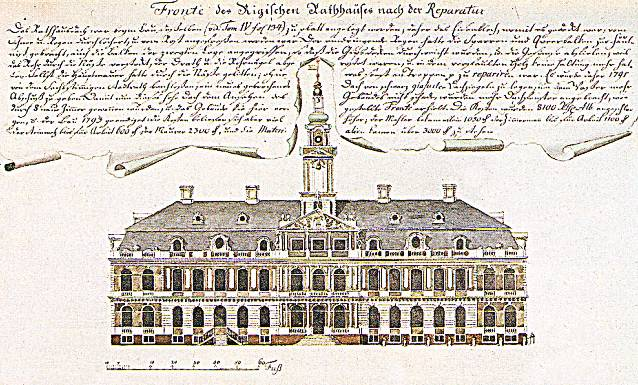
Riga Town Hall after reconstruction in 1793. Drawing by Brotze

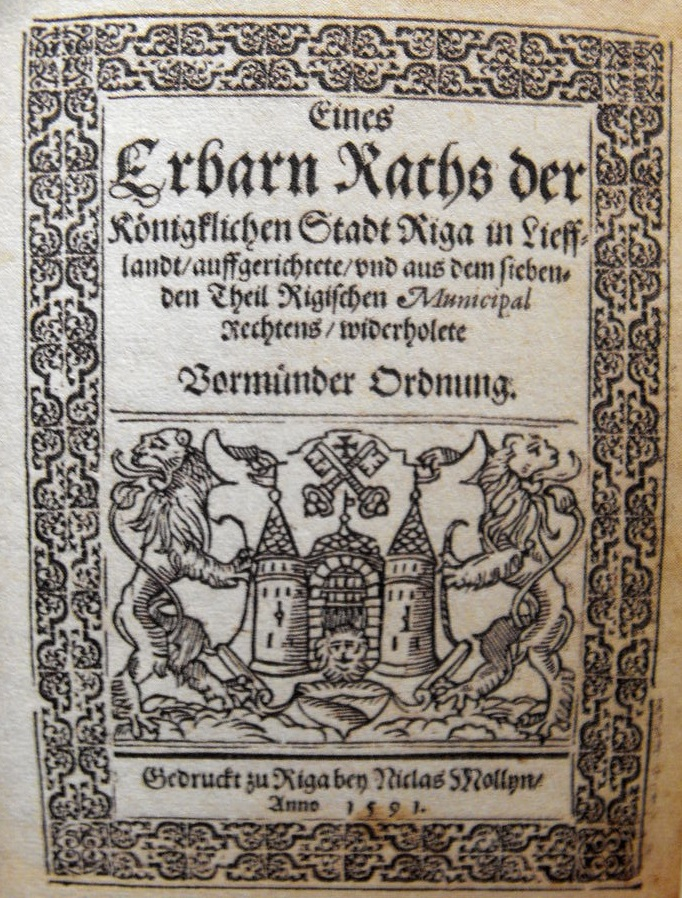
Decree of the Riga Council with the city coat of arms (printed in 1591)

Riga Town Council (consilium civitatis rigensis, Rigaer Rat, Рижский рат, Rīgas rāte) was the municipal and judicial institution of the city of Riga from 1226 to 1889.

It was succeeded by Riga City Council after 1889.

== Middle Ages ==
In 1225, Riga received the city rights of Visby, later known as the Gotland-Riga rights. The Riga Council was first mentioned in a treaty of friendship dated April 18, 1226, which the city of Riga concluded with the Livonian Brothers of the Sword. In 1229, the Riga Council concluded a trade agreement with Prince Mstislav of Smolensk, and in 1230 a peace treaty with the Curonians.

The direct overlord of the city from the 13th century was the Archbishop of Riga, but local self-governance and justice were represented by a vogt or judge (advocatus) appointed by him. His task was to resolve all disputes among townspeople on behalf of the bishop.

The council was elected from among the permanent burghers of Riga. Initially, 12 members were elected annually to the council, called consuls (consulus) or councillors (Ratsherren), but later the council elected its own members for life.

The Riga Council oversaw issues of city defense and its patrimonial district, imposed taxes, represented the interests of Riga citizens in foreign policy, concluded treaties, and appointed envoys. Since the 14th century, the council consisted of four burgomasters, responsible for implementing council decisions and handling routine affairs on behalf of the council, and 16 councillors.

From the late 14th century, councillors were typically selected from the wealthy merchant class. As the council became more exclusive, certain families rose to prominence as the so-called patrician families.

== 16th–18th centuries ==
In 1581, when Free City of Riga came under the control of the Polish–Lithuanian Commonwealth, the Riga Council lost its role in foreign policy, remaining only as a municipal and judicial institution. By the end of the 16th century, tensions between the Riga Council and the guilds over city governance escalated, reaching a peak during the Calendar riots in Riga (1584–1589).

After the Great Northern War, Riga became the administrative center of the Riga Governorate, and after the 1783 reform, of the Riga Vicegerency (Rigasche Statthalterschaft), governed by the General Governor of Riga George Browne. The Riga Council was subordinated to the Riga Magistrate. During the reign of Catherine II, Russian municipal laws were introduced in Riga in 1786, dividing the city’s inhabitants into six classes. A general assembly of the city’s residents elected the city head, burgomasters, and councillors every three years. Emperor Paul I restored the previous order in 1796.

== 19th century ==
During the Russification of the Baltics, the Russian Empire's Municipal Law was applied to Riga in 1877. After its introduction, the Riga Council retained only judicial functions, while municipal functions were transferred to the Riga City Council.

The Riga Town Council was dissolved in 1889.
