= Lithuanian–Muscovite War (1500–1503) =

War between Lithuania and Moscow (1500-1503)

- Part of Muscovite–Lithuanian Wars
- Warfare in the years 1500–1503
Date	1500–1503
Location	Eastern part of Grand Duchy of Lithuania
Result	Muscovite victory
Territorial changes	Grand Duchy of Lithuania loses 210,000 sq km (81,000 sq mi) of land: Chernigov, Novgorod-Seversk, Starodub, and lands around the upper Oka River

Belligerents
Grand Duchy of Lithuania; Livonian Confederation	Principality of Moscow; Crimean Khanate; Pskov Republic; Principality of Novgorod-Seversk

Commanders and leaders
(Grand Duchy of Lithuania) Alexander Jagiellon (Grand Duchy of Lithuania) Konstanty Ostrogski (POW) (Grand Duchy of Lithuania) Stanisław Kiszka (Grand Duchy of Lithuania) Prince Mstislavsky (Grand Duchy of Lithuania) Ostap Dashkevych; Wolter von Plettenberg	Ivan III of Russia; Daniil Shchenya; Vasily Nemoy Shuysky; Semyon Mozhayskiy; Dmitry Ivanovich Zhilka; Meñli I Giray

Strength
Unknown	40,000 soldiers

The Lithuanian–Muscovite War (1500–1503) also known as the Second Lithuanian–Muscovite War was a war between the Grand Duchy of Lithuania led by Alexander Jagiellon, Konstanty Ostrogski and the Livonian Confederation led by Wolter von Plettenberg against the Principality of Moscow led by Ivan III of Russia and Daniil Shchenya and the Crimean Khanate led by Meñli I Giray. It ended in a victory for Muscovy and its allies.

== Prelude ==
=== "Perpetual peace" treaty ===
The First border war ended with a Muscovite victory. At the end of it, an eternal peace treaty was concluded, where most of the "Upper Oka Principalities" and Veliky Novgorod, Pskov, Tver and Ryazan were ceded to Moscow by Lithuania. Moscow renounced its claims on Smolensk and Bryansk which were to remain part of the Grand Duchy of Lithuania. In addition to this, Alexander Jagiellon married Ivan III's daughter Elena.

=== Return of hostilities ===
Hostilities were renewed in May 1500 when Ivan III took advantage of a planned Polish–Hungarian campaign against the Ottoman Empire. He figured that if Poland and Hungary were preoccupied with the Ottomans, they would not be able to assist Lithuania.

== Timeline of the war ==
The war was to take place in three general places, those being Novhorod-Siverskyi, Smolensk and Toropets. The main fighting happened in the direction of Smolensk, which was the second most strategically important front of the war.

The Muscovites managed to quickly occupy Lithuanian fortresses in Bryansk, Vyazma, Dorogobuzh, Toropets and Putivl. After capturing the fortress at Dorogobuzh, half of the Grand Ducal Lithuanian Army, which was a vanguard of about 3,500 horsemen moved towards Smolensk, meeting up with 500 horsemen led by Stanisław Kiszka. Local nobles such as the Vorotynskys often joined the Muscovite army. Another attack came from the southeast into the Kiev Voivodeship, Volhynia and Podolia. On 14 July 1500, the Lithuanians fought against the Muscovite army in the Battle of Vedrosha.

=== Battle of Vedrosha ===
The Grand Hetman of Lithuania Konstanty Ostrogski was confident in his strength, although heavily underestimated the Muscovite army. He decided to attack first with an army of 4,000 soldiers against the Muscovite army numbering at least 20,000 soldiers. The Lithuanians attacked the camp of the central Muscovites forces at a tributary of the Dnieper, the Vedrosha river, but were tricked into a well–organised ambush.

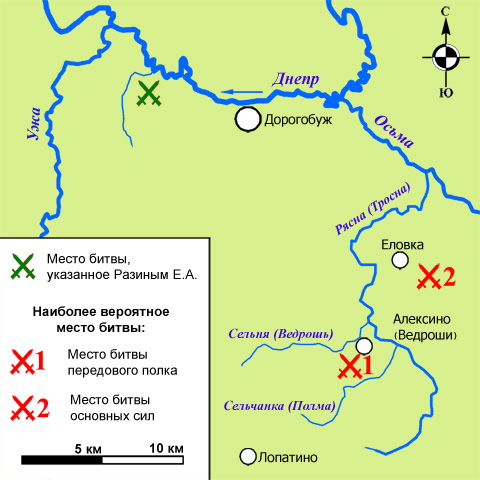
Where the battle most likely took place

The Lithuanian army was lured into the main Muscovite army numbering around 40,000 soldiers commanded by boyars Daniil Shchenya and Yakov Koshkin-Zakharyin. The battle ended in a decisive defeat for Lithuania.

The entire Lithuanian military leadership was captured by Muscovite forces, including Grand Hetman of Lithuania Konstanty Ostrogski, although he escaped from Moscow in 1507.

This defeat greatly affected Lithuanian society, mostly politically and morally. The Lithuanian army received a painful lesson, in which they learnt to not divide limited forces for important operations and, on the contrary, concentrate them as much as possible. The defeat was also one of the reasons for the proposed Union of Mielnik between Poland and Lithuania.

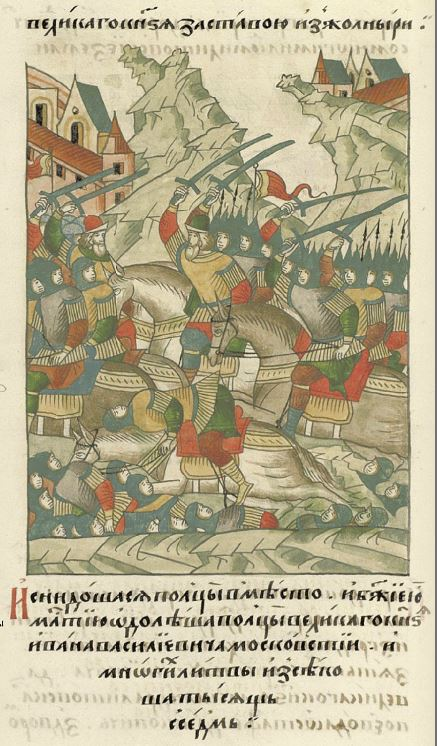
Battle of Mstislavl 1501, miniature from the Front Chronicle

=== Battle of Mstislavl ===
The battle took place on November 4, 1501, when Ivan III sent a new force under the command of Semyon Mozhayskiy towards Mstislavl. Local princes Mstislavsky together with Ostap Dashkevych organised the defense and were badly beaten. Russian forces took advantage of the princes retreat, besieging the city and pillaging surrounding areas. A relief force was organised by Great Hetman Stanislovas Kęsgaila, but neither him nor Mozhayskiy dared to attack with the Russian forces retreating without a battle. The Lithuanian forces had once again been defeated.

=== Death of John I Albert ===
In June 1501, John I Albert, King of Poland died. This left his brother, Alexander Jagiellon, Grand Duke of Lithuania as the strongest candidate to the Polish throne. Due to this, he became preoccupied with the succession. Alexander tried to counter religious accusations by attempting to establish a church union between Catholics and Orthodox as envisioned at the Council of Florence – the Orthodox would retain their traditions but would accept the pope as their spiritual sovereign. The Metropolitan of Kiev and all Rus' agreed to such an arrangement, but Helena was against it. Polish nobles, including Bishop Erazm Ciołek and Cardinal Frederick Jagiellon, discussed the issue of royal divorce.

=== Livonian Confederation joins the war ===
The war continued, although not as successfully for Moscow. The Livonian Confederation led by Wolter von Plettenberg joined the war on Lithuania's side due to concluding a ten–year alliance on 17 May 1501. Their first success was seen in the Battle of the Siritsa River.

=== Battle of the Siritsa River ===
The battle took place on 27 August 1501 between the Livonian Confederation against the Principality of Moscow and Pskov Republic. The Livonian army consisted of 4,000 mounted knights and 2,000 foot landsknechts according to Aleksandr Zimin or 12,000 according to Cathal J. Nolan. The Muscovite army consisted of 6,000 warriors according to Zimin and 40,000 according to Nolan.

The Pskovians attacked first, although were thrown back by the Livonians. The Livonian artillery then destroyed the remainder of the Muscovite army despite a Russian attempt to reply with their own, insufficient artillery force. The Livonians defeated the Muscovites, largely due to the Russians' significant shortage of guns of any kind.

=== Further Livonian success ===
After the Battle of the Siritsa River, the Livonians besieged Pskov and won the Battle of Lake Smolino in September 1502.

=== Siege of Smolensk ===
Smolensk was a strong and strategically important fortress, having been part of the Grand Duchy of Lithuania since 1404. The Russian army had reached it in June 1502, although Smolensk was well prepared. The Russian army plundered Orsha and Vitebsk and attacked Smolensk with insufficient artillery. Not only was the assault on 16 September repelled, but the defense had managed to grow into a counterattack. Lithuanian reinforcements were brought by Stanislovas Kęsgaila as well, eventually forcing the Russians to retreat, suffering a defeat.

=== Destruction of the Golden Horde and Crimean Khanates role ===
The Golden Horde was an ally of Lithuania. The Crimean Khanate had managed to subjugate what remained of the Great Horde after sacking the capital New Sarai in 1502. It had also managed to pillage the Lithuania's southern towns of Slutsk, Kletsk, and Nyasvizh, even threatening the capital city of Vilnius.

=== Peace negotiations ===
The peace negotiations had begun in mid–1502 while the Siege of Smolensk was still ongoing. Alexander asked Vladislaus II of Hungary to act as the mediator, and a six-year truce was concluded on the Feast of the Annunciation (March 25) in 1503.

== Result ==
The war had ended, with devastating terms for Lithuania. The Grand Duchy of Lithuania lost approximately 210,000 square kilometres (81,000 sq mi), or a third of its territory: Chernigov, Novgorod-Seversk, Starodub, and lands around the upper Oka River. Russian historian Matvei Kuzmich Liubavskii counted Lithuanian losses at 70 volosts, 22 towns, and 13 villages.

== Aftermath ==
The Lithuanians acknowledged Ivan's title, sovereign of all Russia. Historian Edvardas Gudavičius said: "The war of 1492–1494 was a kind of reconnaissance mission conducted by the united Russia. [The terms of] the ceasefire of 1503 showed the planned political aggression of Russia, its undoubted military superiority. The concept of the sovereign of all Russia, put forward by Ivan III, did not leave room for the existence of the Lithuanian state".

Although Moscow had failed to capture Smolensk in this war, it successfully did so in the Lithuanian–Muscovite War (1512–1522) with the Siege of Smolensk in 1514.

Due to the Crimean Khanate managing to impose a threat on Vilnius during the war, Alexander Jagiellon ordered the construction of a defensive wall around his capital, which was completed in 1522.

The Livonian Order and Principality of Moscow didn't fight against each other until the Livonian War (1558–1583), where the Livonian Confederation was dissolved in the Treaty of Vilnius (1561).
