= Wolter von Plettenberg =

Master of the Livonian Order from 1494 to 1535

- Landmeister of the Livonian Order; Prince of the Holy Roman Empire
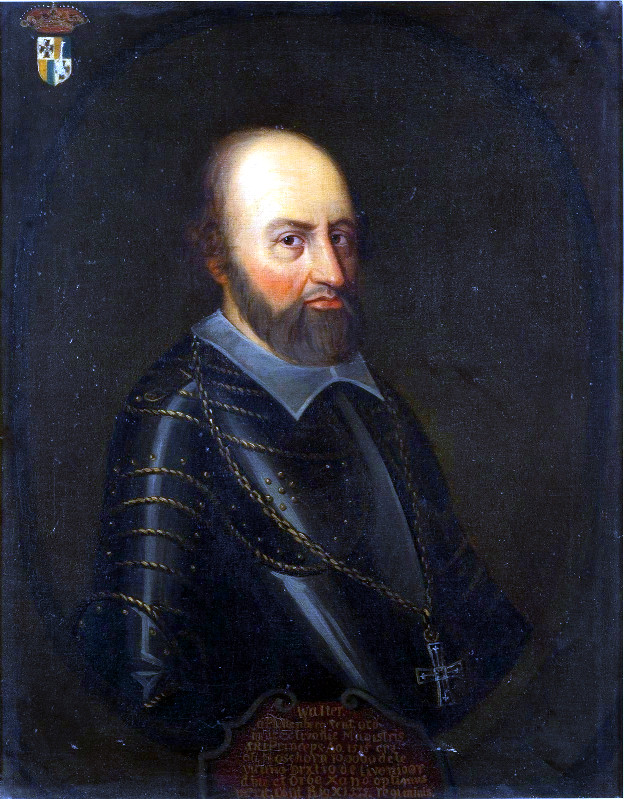
- Painting around 1700
- Tenure: 1494–1535 (as Landmeister); 1526–1535 (as Imperial Prince)
- Born: c. 1450; Meyerich Castle, Welver, Westphalia
- Died: 28 February 1535; Wenden Castle, Livonia
- Buried: St. John's Church, Cēsis
- Noble family: House of Plettenberg
- Father: Berthold von Plettenberg
- Mother: Gosteke Lappe

Wolter or Walter von Plettenberg (c. 1450 – February 28, 1535) was Master (Landmeister) of the Livonian Order from 1494 to 1535, and one of the greatest leaders of the Teutonic Knights. He was an important early Baltic German.

== Early Life and Career (until 1494) ==
Personal coat of arms

Wolter von Plettenberg was born in Welver (in Meyerich Castle), Westphalia. Belonging to the House of Plettenberg, he was the first child of his father Berthold von Plettenberg and his mother Gosteke Lappe, but had at least seven siblings. He went to work at the Fort of Narva at the age of ten and joined the Teutonic Order when he was about 14.

After joining the Teutonic Order in Riga at age 14, Plettenberg rose rapidly through its ranks. He served as trade counsellor ("Schäfter") for the Order in 1481, then as commander ("Vogt") of Rositten Castle from 1482 to 1488. In 1489, Grand Master Johann Freytag von Loringhoven appointed him as marshal of the Order (Landmarschall), effectively making him the military leader of Livonia. In this role, he successfully commanded military operations throughout Livonia.

On 30 March 1491, while serving as marshal, Plettenberg won the Battle of Neuermühlen (Ādaži) against the forces of the Archbishopric of Riga and the city of Riga. This victory established the Teutonic Order as the protector of Livonia and enabled it to play a central role in the Livonian Confederation, laying the decisive foundation for the unification of Old Livonia.

Following the death of Grand Master Loringhoven, Plettenberg was elected as his successor on July 7, 1494. That same year, Moscow closed down the Hanseatic office in Novgorod and imprisoned Hanseatic merchants there (most of them Livonians). Livonia was drifting into war with Muscovite Russia. After negotiations in 1498 failed, Plettenberg chose to prepare for pre-emptive attack against Pskov, which was then still a formally independent state, but under heavy influence from Moscow.

== Grand Master of Livonia (1494–1535) ==
=== War with Russia (1501–1503) ===
In 1500, Plettenberg made an alliance with the Grand Duke of Lithuania, Alexander Jagiellon (the Treaty of Wenden), who had been at war with Russia since 1499. He also tried to convince Pope Alexander VI to issue a crusading bull against the Russians in order to acquire funding from the sale of indulgences, but his efforts were in vain.

In the war with Russia (1501–1503), Plettenberg showed himself to be a talented and skilled commander. His strength lay in his skillful use of heavy cavalry and artillery fire. With such tactics Plettenberg won the Battle of the Siritsa River (August 1501), where an army of the Livonian Confederation of 8,000 foot and 4,000 horse defeated a roughly twice as large Russian army. However, an outbreak of dysentery in Plettenberg's army prevented him from exploiting this success. A subsequent defeat at the Battle of Helmet and the unsuccessful siege of Pskov followed. Without the promised help of the Lithuanians, Plettenberg was unable to conquer Pskov and only burned the stronghold of Ostrov.

During the winter of 1501–1502, the Russians harshly ravaged Eastern Livonia and many Livonian dignitaries wanted to make peace with Muscovy. But Plettenberg decided to continue the war and attempted to conquer Pskov one more time. However, due to Moscow's strong support of Pskov, he was forced to retreat southwest from the city. On 13 September 1502, he won the Battle of Lake Smolina (at Lake Smolina close to the village Palkino in Pskov Oblast) with his 5,000 men against about 12,000 Russians. The next day, 14 September, became the Victory Day in Livonia.

=== Diplomacy and Peace (1503–1535) ===
In 1503, peace between Ivan III and Livonia on the terms of status quo ante bellum was concluded. Due to the lack of Lithuanian support, Plettenberg achieved only a six-year peace treaty from Moscow, though it was renewed in 1509, 1521, and 1531. Plettenberg succeeded in maintaining Livonian neutrality in the ongoing conflicts between Poland-Lithuania and Muscovy from 1503 onwards, refusing to commit too heavily to either side in order not to endanger Livonia's independence. Among his closest advisers during this period was Robert Staël von Holstein, who served as the Order Master's Hofrichter (court judge) and was dispatched three times as emissary to foreign courts on Plettenberg's behalf. Through military self-assertion and diplomatic restraint, he protected the country from renewed Russian aggression for more than half a century—the peace he established lasted nearly 60 years until the outbreak of the Livonian War in 1558, more than two decades after his death.

=== Relations with the Teutonic Order in Prussia and Territorial Gains (1519–1525) ===
Plettenberg also skillfully managed relations with the Teutonic Order in Prussia. When Grand Master Albert von Brandenburg-Ansbach attempted to recruit Livonia for his planned war against Poland (1519–1521), Plettenberg refused, preserving peace for Livonia and maintaining independence from the Order's policies in Prussia.

In 1525, taking advantage of Albert's financial difficulties following his conversion to Protestantism and secularization of the Prussian branch of the Order, Plettenberg brought the northern Estonian territories of Harju County ("Harrien") and Virumaa ("Wierland"), including the city of Tallinn ("Reval"), under his direct control. These territories had previously been under the sovereignty of the Grand Master in Prussia, and their acquisition significantly strengthened Plettenberg's position.

=== Reformation in Livonia (1521–1526) ===
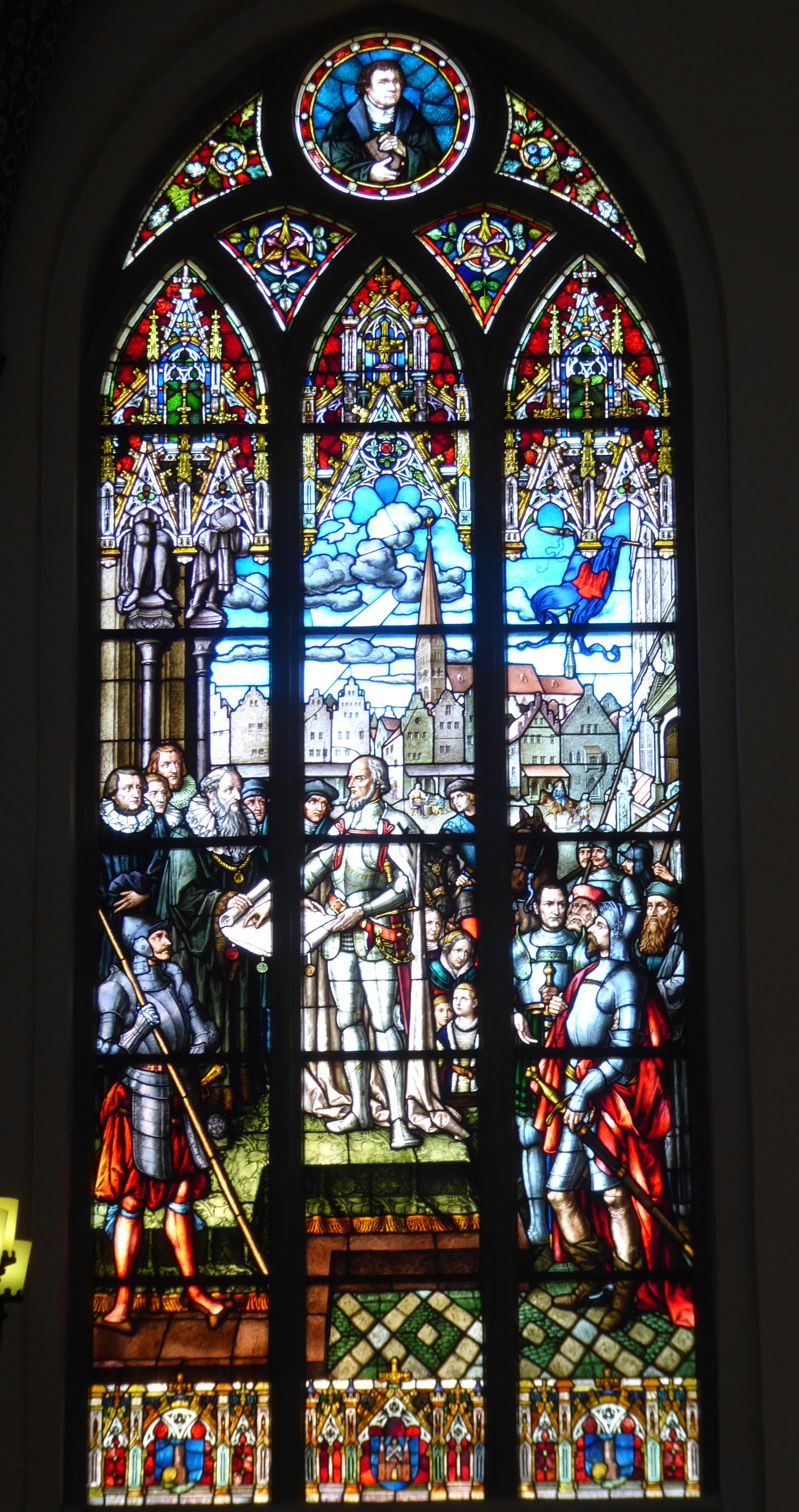
Wolter von Plettenberg grants Riga religious freedom (stained-glass window in Riga Cathedral)

During the Protestant Reformation, which reached Livonia in 1521–1522, Plettenberg faced a complex political and religious situation. The Livonian confederation lacked a central authority and included diverse actors with different stances toward the Reformation: the Church with its dioceses and monasteries, cities tied to the Hanseatic League, the knighthood, and the Teutonic Order itself, along with various international powers seeking to expand their influence.

Fearing violence and foreign intervention in the fragmented confederation, Plettenberg pragmatically decided to allow Livonian churches to conduct services in the Lutheran manner from 1522 onwards. This decision enabled the bloodless introduction of the Reformation among Germans, Estonians, and Latvians in Livonia. However, Plettenberg himself remained Catholic throughout his life, deeply rooted in his traditional faith and the Order's allegiance to the Catholic Emperor and Pope.

In 1525–1526, he rejected conversion to Lutheranism and secularization of the Livonian Order, despite considerable pressure from multiple sources: the city of Riga, Grand Master Albert von Brandenburg-Ansbach (who had converted to Protestantism and secularized the Prussian branch of the Order), and even the Hanseatic League, which consequently rejected an alliance with Plettenberg at the general Hanseatic Diet in Lübeck.

Plettenberg also imprisoned Archbishop of Riga Thomas Schöning in Ronneburg Castle when the archbishop appealed to the Grand Duke of Moscow for help, demonstrating his determination to prevent foreign interference in Livonian affairs.

== Prince of the Holy Roman Empire (1526–1530) ==
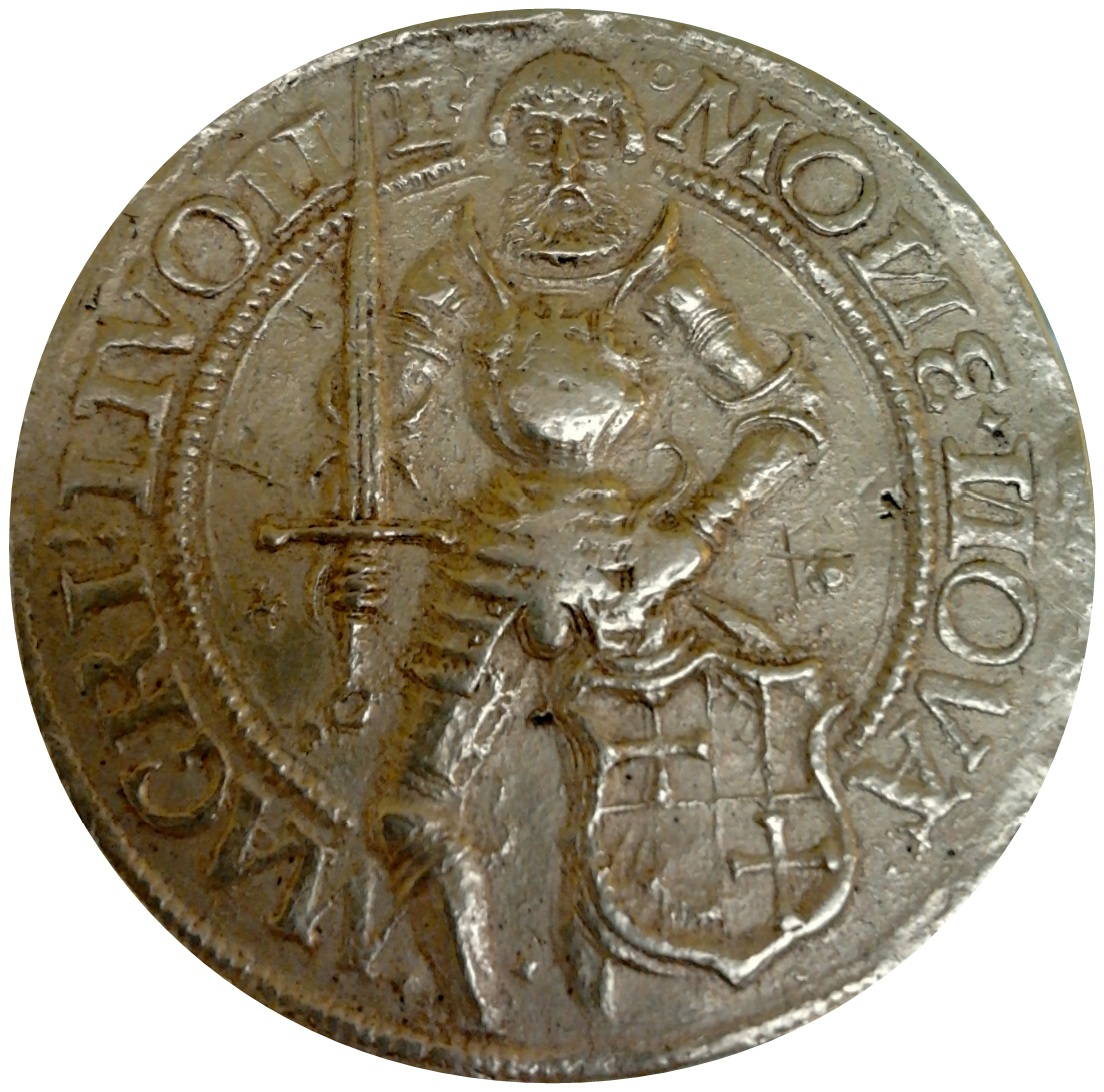
Gold coin depicting Wolter von Plettenberg (1525)

Following his refusal to convert to Lutheranism, Plettenberg sought to strengthen Livonia's ties to the Holy Roman Empire while carefully maintaining its autonomy. Through the stipulations of the Esslinger Reichsregiment in 1526, he gained the status of Prince of the Holy Roman Empire (Reichsfürst), which was confirmed by Emperor Charles V in 1530. As Imperial Prince, he was directly bound to the Emperor, who granted him the regalia independently of the Grand Master of the Teutonic Order in Prussia. This elevation gave Plettenberg the same rank as the Grand Master himself, significantly strengthening both his personal position and Livonia's standing within the Empire.

Plettenberg carefully balanced this imperial connection with Livonian autonomy. On one hand, he refused attempts by Pope Clement VII, Emperor Charles V, and his brother, German King Ferdinand I, to assign him a princely coadjutor, which would have tied him more closely to the Catholic and imperial cause. On the other hand, he successfully reinforced Livonia's status and obtained — at least in theory — the Empire's backing in the region's political and military challenges.

== Final Years and Succession (1528–1535) ==
In 1528, Thomas Schöning became Archbishop of Riga and sought to strengthen the archbishopric's position. In 1529, he appointed Wilhelm von Brandenburg, brother of Duke Albert of Prussia, as his coadjutor. Wilhelm, who was Protestant, attempted to expand his power, leading to strong opposition within the Livonian Order and broader Livonian society, where many feared he might attempt to secularize all of Livonia.

In 1532, Wilhelm intervened in the internal conflicts of the Bishopric of Ösel-Wiek and in November seized control of Wiek. Plettenberg decided not to intervene militarily, fearing this could provoke intervention by Denmark, Poland-Lithuania, or Prussia. Instead, he attempted to resolve the conflicts diplomatically by concluding the Treaty of Tartu (Võnnu liit) in 1533 with Wilhelm and the city of Riga. This treaty allowed freedom for the spread of Protestantism and aimed to restrain Wilhelm's ambitions by prohibiting offensive warfare. The alliance was partly forced, as Wilhelm was strongly supported by Denmark's King Frederick I.

However, several Order commanders secretly sided with Reinhold von Buxhoeveden, who had been confirmed as bishop by the Pope against Wilhelm. The 1534 Livonian Diet in Viljandi did not support the Tartu alliance. After Frederick I's death had deprived Wilhelm of his main supporter, Plettenberg switched sides in 1534, joining other Livonian rulers in the Treaty of Viljandi supporting Buxhoeveden. In September 1534, Wilhelm was forced to abandon Wiek.

During his final years, Plettenberg also experienced considerable pressure from the Emperor and his favorites to appoint a member of a German princely family as his coadjutor to strengthen the Order's position and bind it more firmly to the Empire. Duke Karl of Münsterberg actively worked to make his son Johann a coadjutor. The Livonian Order feared that appointing a princely coadjutor might lead to the Order's secularization, as had happened in Prussia. Therefore, in 1532, Plettenberg designated the long-serving marshal Hermann von Brüggenei as his successor. Brüggenei received confirmation from German King Ferdinand I in 1533 and received final approval as coadjutor at the Viljandi Diet in February 1534.

== Death ==
By November 1534, Plettenberg was so ill that he could not meet with Wilhelm and communicated his positions in writing. He called for a new diet to convene in March 1535. However, on February 28, 1535 (dies Oculi), he died relatively unexpectedly at Wenden Castle at the age of about 85 years. According to legend, he died in full armor, sitting in front of a fireplace in an armchair. He is buried in Cēsis at St. John's church.

== Legacy ==
During his 41-year tenure in Livonian leadership—serving as marshal from 1489 to 1494 and Grand Master from 1494 to 1535—Wolter von Plettenberg maintained regional stability through military campaigns, diplomatic alliances, and neutrality among neighboring powers.

His diplomatic wisdom was evident in his ability to avoid being manipulated by the interests of third parties, even when their offers seemed attractive. He ignored repeated invitations to take paths that would not serve Livonia's best interests, maintaining a healthy autonomy and independence within the international political framework of his time. The peace he established through the treaty of 1503, renewed in 1509, 1521, and 1531, lasted nearly 60 years until the outbreak of the Livonian War in 1558—a remarkable achievement in the turbulent 16th century. This enduring peace enabled favorable economic and demographic development in the territories of present-day Estonia and Latvia, demonstrating the lasting impact of his strategic vision.

Traditionally, both Baltic Germans and Estonian historians have considered Plettenberg one of the most capable and successful leaders in Livonian history, the former having called him one of the greatest masters of the order and a national hero. His bust was included in the German Walhalla memorial.

Two books have been written that focus on Plettenberg: Hans-Friedrich Blunck's Wolter von Plettenberg, Deutschordensmeister in Livland (1938) and Mia Munier-Wroblewski's Zeitenwende, Ein Deutschordensroman (1939). Additionally, Plettenberg has been featured in several fictional works.

Many sculptures have been made of Plettenberg. The most famous is a bust located in the Walhalla memorial near Regensburg, Germany. In Riga, there are the 16th-century stone relief sculptures (c. 1515) of Plettenberg and the Madonna at the Riga Castle gateway — the originals are held in the Latvian National Museum of History, while copies adorn the castle facade. A sculpture of Plettenberg was also installed in 1867 on the facade of the House of the Livonian Knighthood (now the Latvian Parliament building) in Riga. Additionally, a large stained-glass window in Riga Cathedral depicts Plettenberg granting religious freedom to the city.

In 2015, the Bank of Latvia located in Riga issued a collector coin on the 500th anniversary of the Riga Castle that depicted the castle along with Plettenberg and the Virgin Mary.

== See also ==
- House of Plettenberg

Preceded by Johann Freytag von Loringhoven	Master of the Teutonic Order in Livonia; 1494–1535	Succeeded by Hermann von Brüggenei
