= Reginald of Bologna =

Reginald (or Rayner) of Bologna (died 1256) was the Archbishop of Armagh and Primate of Ireland from 1247 until his death. He was highly praised by Humbert de Romans, Bernard Gui, Antonio Pierozzi, Leander Alberti, and Thomas Malvenda in his Annals.

== Biography ==
Reginald was an early follower of Dominic of Osma and entered the Dominican Order at San Nicolò delle Vigne in Bologna, where he was thereafter lived in a Dominican confraternity. The name by which he is commonly known may indicate either that he was born in Bologna or merely reflects his conversion and occupation there. His teaching at the University of Bologna influenced Ramon de Penyafort to convert to mendicancy in 1222. In 1221 he was one of twelve or thirteen friars sent to England by Dominic in one of his last acts. Their work was to be not only missional but also foundational: they were commissioned to found Dominican houses in the British Isles, under the superiority of Gilbert of Fresnay. Reginald held no official post in the Isles, rather he travelled them widely, covering most of England and setting foot in Ireland.

Reginald spent a few years in Britain before returning to Italy, where he entered the service of Pope Gregory IX as a penitentiary in Rome. It was he who received the news in Europe of the death of the Dominican master-general, Jordan of Saxony, off the coast of Palestine and brought it, with another Dominican papal penitentiary, Godfrey, to Paris and probably elsewhere in 1237.

In 1247 Pope Innocent IV appointed Reginald Archbishop of Armagh and Primate of Ireland, perhaps on account of his knowledge of the English language, but also as a check on the power of Henry III of England over the Irish church. Two other Dominicans, David McKelly, Archbishop of Cashel, and Alan O'Sullivan, Bishop of Cloyne, already held posts in Ireland and may have influenced Innocent's choice of Reginald to replace the abdicating Albert Suerbeer. Reginald could speak no Irish. The Irish Annals of Ulster state that the bishop of Raith Luraigh (now the diocese of Derry) was appointed as Albert's successor, indicating that Reginald was already serving in Ireland.

In 1252 Reginald paid his ad limina to Innocent IV, but was detained in Rome for a long period of time litigating on behalf of his diocese, which cases he eventually won. He never returned to Ireland. He died in Italy late in 1256, probably at either Rome or Anagni. He may have been ill for some time.
