= Livonian Chronicle of Russow =

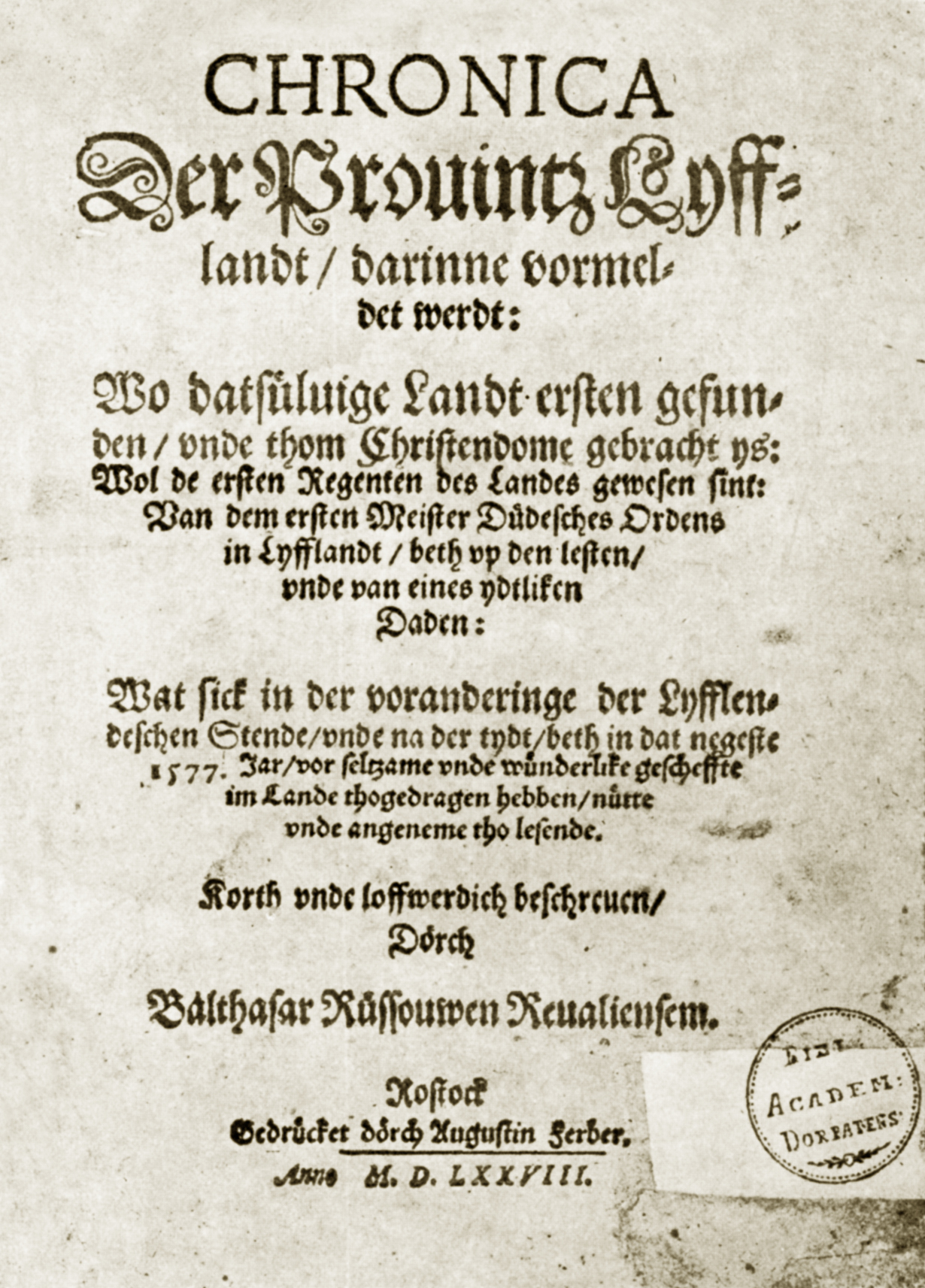
Baltasar Russow's Chronicle of Livonia, published in 1578.

Russow's Chronicle of Livonia (Chronica der Prouintz Lyffland; 1578; 1584) is the latest of the Livonian Chronicles, describing the history of Livonia from its beginnings until the year 1583.

The author of the chronicle is Tallinn’s Lutheran pastor Balthasar Russow (Russow; Rüssow). The first edition of the chronicle was published in 1578 in Rostock. It covered the period from the founding of Livonia up to the year 1577. A reprint followed within half a year. In 1584, a new expanded edition was published in Barth (Pomerania), covering Livonian history up to 1583.

The chronicle is written in Middle Low German and is also significant as the last notable work composed in this dialect. Martin Luther’s Bible translation and the spread of Protestantism in regions previously dominated by Middle Low German (northern Germany and the Baltic German provinces) promoted the spread of the High German dialect.

The chronicle was also the first printed comprehensive history of Livonia. It is also the first major work after the Chronicle of Henry of Livonia and the Rhymed Chronicle, describing the indigenous peoples of the Baltic region, and one of the first works to portray the harsh life of peasants in Livonia. Russow also provides entirely new information about peasant customs, feasts, and legal systems.

== Contents of the Chronicle ==
The first edition of the chronicle consisted of three parts:

- Part I – Geographical description of Livonia and history up to 1237 (up to the defeat of the Livonian Brothers of the Sword at the Battle of Saule and the order's incorporation into the Teutonic Order);
- Part II – From 1237 to 1561 (the period of the Livonian Order until the dissolution of Livonian statelets);
- Part III – From 1561 to 1577.

The second edition was supplemented with a new, fourth part covering the period from 1577 to 1583 (end of the Livonian War).

The beginning of the chronicle, covering the period up to the start of the Livonian War, is a broad compilation. In Part I, the author used the older Livonian Rhymed Chronicle as a source, along with other Order chronicles and possibly the Chronicle of Henry, though his description often contains chronological errors and even fantastical fabrications. For Part II, sources included T. Horner’s 1551 list of Order masters, the 1508 printed Eynne shonne hystorie, the historical poem Aulaeum Dunaidum published by the humanist A. Unferfert-Eucaedius in 1564, and the Younger Rhymed Chronicle of Honeke. Despite being a compilation, this part may interest historians, e.g., with excerpts from Honeke’s Chronicle, which has not survived. However, starting with the depiction of the Livonian War, the chronicle gains value as an independent source. To describe the events of the Livonian War, Russow used his own observations and memories, contemporary accounts, certain documents from the Tallinn town council archive, and pamphlets issued during the war.

The chronicle mainly contains information about conditions in Estonia, less about Vidzeme, and almost nothing about Courland. Special attention is given to the Livonian Order, which ruled over Estonia in the Middle Ages.

When using Russow’s Chronicle, one must consider his ideological perspective. The chronicle was largely written to justify the policies implemented in Reval during the Livonian War. Russow supported Swedish political power, and thus sharply criticized the Livonian period. As a convinced Protestant, he is hostile to Catholicism and often judges events as a moralist and theologian. As a representative of Tallinn’s burgher class, Russow strongly opposed the nobility. This position also led him to portray the condition of peasants in the chronicle.

== Critical Views ==
Russow’s criticism of the Livonian nobility sparked intense controversy. In his chronicle, Russow attacked the former Dorpat bailiff (Sliftsfogt) Ehlert Kruse, who had repeatedly switched allegiances, serving the Bishopric of Dorpat, Russia, and Poland. Russow called him a traitor. Kruse considered it necessary to defend his “honor” by composing a rebuttal to Russow’s chronicle titled “Truthful Rebuttal to the Livonian Chronicle Published in 1578” (Warhufftiger Gegenbericht auf die anno 1578 ausgegangene Liefflendische Chronica Balthasar Russows), published in 1579. It was reissued by A. Buchholtz in 1861.

A much more serious attack came from Heinrich von Tiesenhausen, the noble lord of Bērzaune and Kalsnava, who had previously headed the nobility of the Archbishopric of Riga and later became its historian. He published a pamphlet titled “Errors Committed by the Livonian Chronicler B. Russow” (Begangene Irrthümer und fehler des Liffländischen Chronikenschreibers Balthasaris Russouwens). Tiesenhausen accused Russow of ignorance of Livonian history and explained his defense of peasants by Russow’s alleged descent from Estonian peasants. Tiesenhausen’s rebuttal listed 54 separate “violations” by Russow against the Livonian nobility, bishops, and archbishops.

Nevertheless, these rebuttals did not diminish the popularity of Russow’s Chronicle. Later, the noble lord of Lode manor (in Estonia), Tönnies Maydel (Maydel), head of the Estonian nobility organization, also attacked Russow in a rebuttal written in 1588. Pointing to Russow’s origins, Maydel called him a “mad peasant ox.”

== Translations ==
In the 17th and 18th centuries, Russow’s Chronicle was widely used by other chroniclers. For example, Dionysius Fabricius’s chronicle is largely a Latin translation of Russow’s work.

Later, a version of Russow’s chronicle with word translations into modern German was published in 1848 in volume II of Scriptores rerum Livonicarum. In 1895, a full translation into modern German was made by Ed. Pabst. A Latvian translation was published in 1926 by Ed. Veispals. Unfortunately, this translation is very poor and full of errors.

== Sources ==
- Russow’s Chronicle of Livonia, Historia.lv

== See also ==
- Livonian Chronicle
