= Berthold of Chiemsee =

German bishop and theological writer (1465–1543)

Berthold of Chiemsee (1465 – 19 July 1543) was a German bishop and theological writer.

== Biography ==
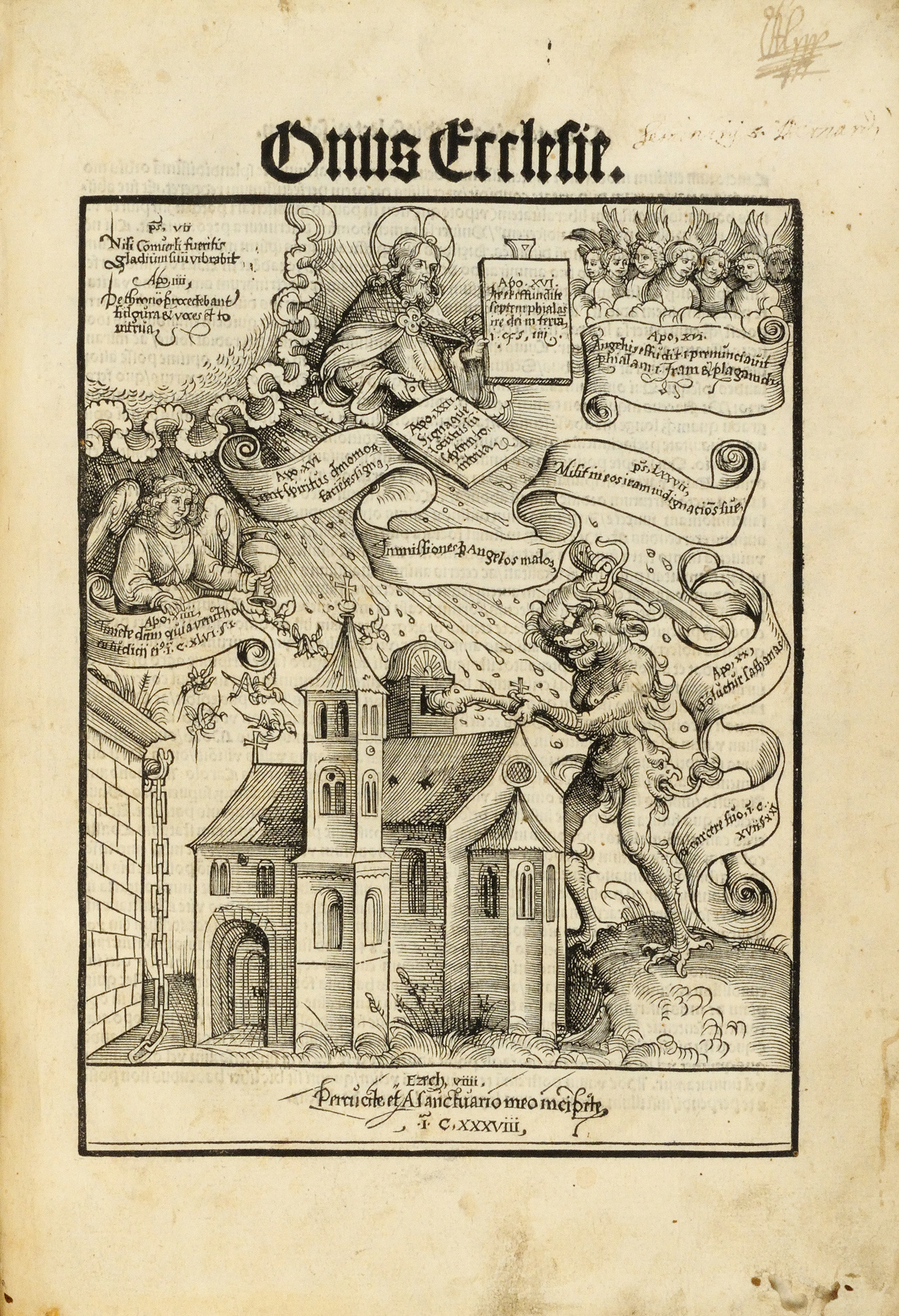
The title page of 'Onus Ecclesiæ' (1524) attributed to Berthold of Chiemsee

Berthold was born in Salzburg, Austria. His real name was Berthold Pürstinger, frequently called Pirstinger; but he is generally known as Berthold of Chiemsee, from his episcopal see, situated on one of the islands of the Bavarian lake of Chiemsee. He was licentiate in civil, and doctor in ecclesiastical law, and in 1495 he appears as the Magister Cameræ of the Archbishop of Salzburg, and in 1508 was appointed Bishop of Chiemsee. During his episcopal career (1508–25), he resided at Salzburg, in the position of Coadjutor bishop to the archbishop of the latter place.

Berthold twice conspicuously used his influence with the Archbishop of Salzburg in behalf of the unfortunate: in 1511 in favour of the Salzburg town-councillors who had been condemned for high treason, and again in 1524 in the interest of rebellious peasants. He was present at the Provincial Council of Salzburg (1512), and also took an active part in 1522 in that of Mühldorf (Bavaria), which was convened to devise means of stemming the tide of Lutheran progress. Soon after, he resigned his bishopric (1526) and retired to the monastery of Raitenhaslach on the Austro-Bavarian frontier. In 1528, or 1529, he removed to Saalfelden, where he founded (1533) a hospital with a church for infirm priests. He died there, aged about 78, and was buried in the parish church.

== Works ==
After his resignation of his episcopal functions Berthold devoted his time to literary pursuits. At the suggestion of Matthäus Lang von Wellenburg, the Cardinal Archbishop of Salzburg (1519–40), he wrote his Tewtsche Theologey (German Theology – Munich, 1528) and translated it afterwards into Latin Augsburg, 1531). The work does not seem to have been in great demand, as neither the original nor the translation was reprinted until Reithmeier re-edited the work (1852).

The other writings of Berthold were: (1) Tewtsch Rational, a treatise on the Mass; (2) Keligpuchel, a defence of the Catholic doctrine and practice of Communion under one kind, against the Reformers; (3) Onus Ecclesiæ or "Burden of the Church" (Landshut, 1524) is also generally attributed to him. It is an exposition, from a Catholic point of view, of the abuses then prevalent in the Church. The book occasioned much comment and was reprinted twice in 1531, at Cologne and probably at Augsburg, and again in 1620 without indication of place.
