= Free City of Riga =

City-state in Livonia (1561–1581)

Free City of Riga (German: Freie Stadt Riga, Latvian: Rīgas brīvpilsēta) was a largely autonomous city-state in present-day Latvia from 1561 to 1581. Following the dissolution of the Livonian Confederation in 1561, Riga resisted incorporation into the Grand Duchy of Lithuania and maintained considerable political autonomy for approximately two decades. During this period, the city was governed by the Riga Town Council, which was dominated by the German-speaking urban elite. In January 1581, the city submitted to Stephen Báthory, ruler of the Polish–Lithuanian Commonwealth, under the Treaty of Drohiczyn, which confirmed many of its traditional rights and privileges. Riga subsequently retained substantial municipal autonomy.

== History ==
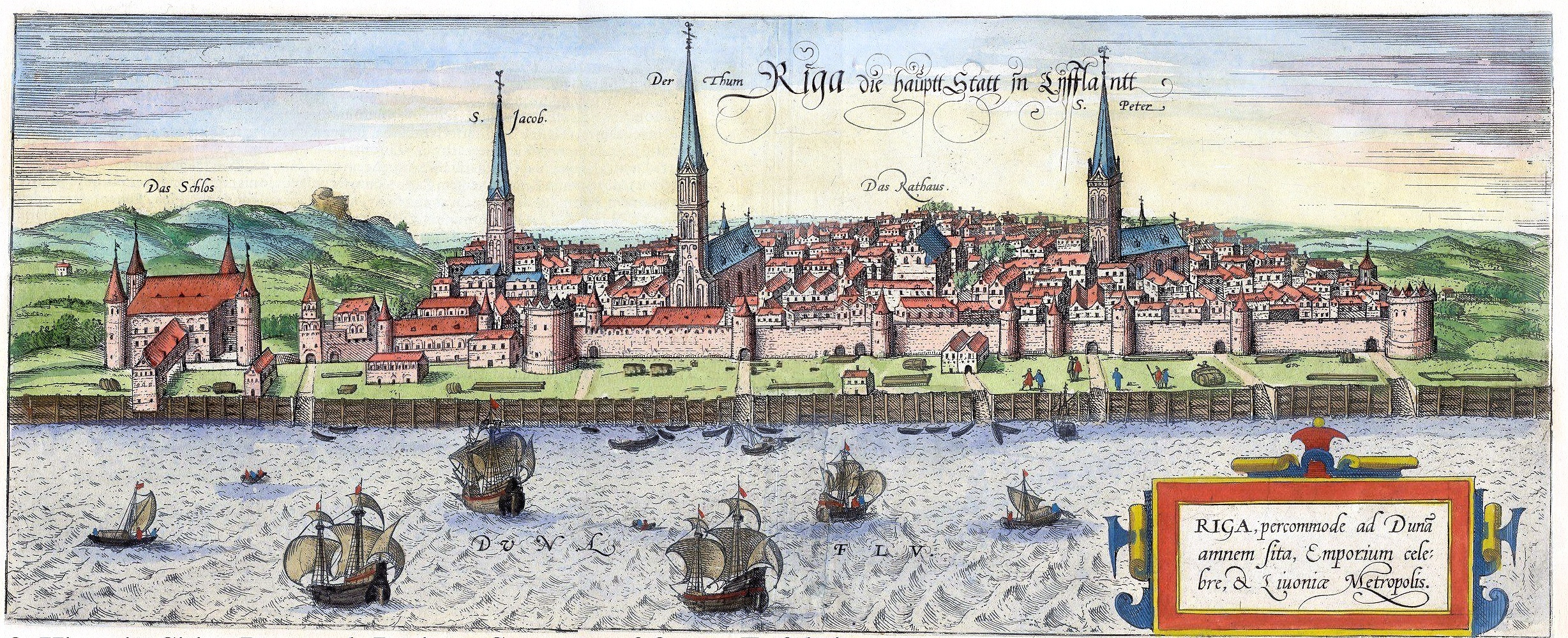
Panorama of the Free City of Riga (1581), painting by G. Braun and F. Hohenberg (Civitates Orbis Terrarum).

As a result of the Polish conquests, the Danish lands of the former Bishopric of Courland found themselves surrounded by Polish-Lithuanian possessions, which exerted significant military pressure on them. Livonian Order fell. Archbishopric of Riga, the center of which Riga was for many years, ceased to exist.

Livonia, as it was before, could no longer exist. One of the outcomes of the Livonian War was the emergence of new vassal states on the ruins of the former stronghold of German Catholics in the eastern Baltic. There were three of them – the Free City of Riga, Duchy of Courland and Semigallia and Duchy of Zadvina, also called Livonian.

It was a matter of time before Riga received the status of a free city. In the conflicts of medieval Livonia, the people of Riga rarely took sides, and were often guided solely by their own interests, thus being not a mediator in the conflicts between the Pope and the Livonian Order, but a third party with their own opinion. As a result of the Union of Vilna in 1561, the city-state of Riga appears on the map of Europe.

It cannot be said that it was an independent entity. The city recognized itself as a vassal of the Grand Duchy of Lithuania, and then of the Polish-Lithuanian Commonwealth. The city of Riga did not agree with the terms of the Grodno union, as a result of which it was supposed to become part of the Duchy of Zadvina, and was looking for opportunities to strengthen its independence.

On July 7, 1567, the governor of the Duchy of Zadvina, Jan Chodkiewicz, tried to conquer the free city of Riga, but was defeated in a battle in which about 30 Lithuanians died. Of the city's defenders, approximately 15 or 16 "non-German" soldiers were killed.

After lengthy negotiations with the Polish king Stefan Batory in Drogichin, on January 14, 1581, the Treaty of Drogichin was signed between the city of Riga and the Polish-Lithuanian Commonwealth, which retained certain privileges for Riga residents, which were later called "Corpus Privilegiorum Stephanorum". To take the oath of allegiance to Riga, King Stefan Batory arrived at Riga Castle on March 12, 1582. The agreement was signed on April 7.

In the early 1580s, Lutheranism was finally established in the city. Therefore, the subordination of the city to Catholic Poland in 1582 caused the long calendar unrest of 1583–1589, when the Riga Rath, by order of the Polish king, tried to introduce a new Gregorian calendar, proposed by the Pope Gregory XIII.

== Religion ==
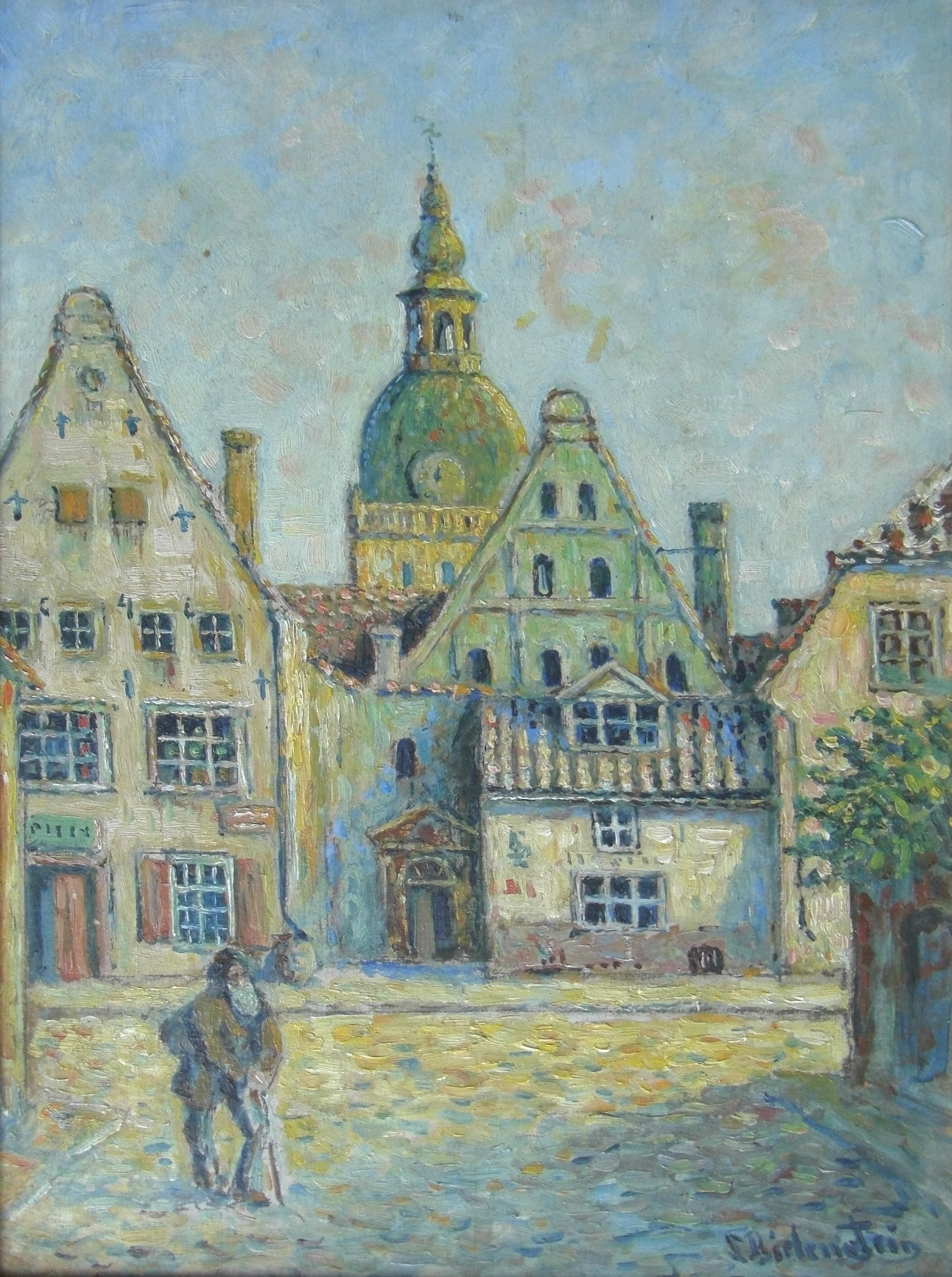
Three Brothers (Riga), painting by Siegfried Bilenstein. Riga Cathedral in the background.

In the 1520s, the Bible was partially translated into Latvian. In 1539, Riga became part of the Protestant cities. Even during the time of the Archbishopric of Riga, many Catholic churches were given to the Lutherans. Riga, which was home to many people from those regions of Germany where Protestant ideas had a special development, became one of the first cities in Europe where Protestantism became the most popular religion among the townspeople. During the existence of the Free City, Protestantism increasingly replaced Catholicism.

In the 16th century, Calvinist communities also emerged in Latvia.

== Territory and management ==
The free city of Riga, governed by the German-speaking Riga Town Hall, skillfully maneuvering between the interests of rival states, remained a German enclavein the Polish-Lithuanian state. The city was able to keep under its control the Riga Patrimonial District with a total area of about 750 km^{2}, which was somewhat smaller than the pre-war landfogtia with an area of about 1000 km^{2}. The Free City continued to mint its own coin. On the coins there was an image of the city's coat of arms and an inscription that confirmed its belonging to the city of Riga ("CIVITATIS RIGENSIS"). The Riga silver dealer (Thaler) held 4.5 Riga silver marks or 18 silver ferdings. In turn, one ferding contained 9 silver shillings of lower quality or 27 pfennigs.

== Money of the Free City of Riga ==
During this period, Riga minted its own money with the image of the city's coat of arms and an inscription that confirmed its belonging to the city of Riga ("CIVITATIS RIGENSIS"). Riga silver dalder (thaler) included 4.5 Riga silver marks (Mark) or 18 silver verdins (Ferding ). On the other hand, 9 lower yeast silver shillings (Schilling) or 27 fennigs (Pfennig) were included in one shilling.

1571. of Riga feniņš with coat of arms (silver 94, weight 0.26 g, diameter 12.0 mm).

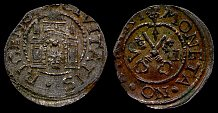
Riga shilling (silver 94, weight 0.90-1.00 g, diameter 18.0-18.3 mm, minted 1571.).

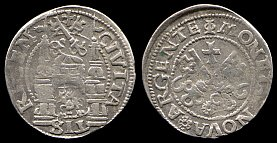
Riga silver coin (silver 437.5, weight 2.70-2.85 g, diameter 22.0-23.2 mm, minted 1564–1569, 1579).

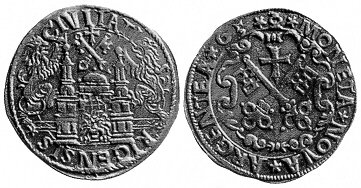
Riga halfmark with the big city coat of arms (silver 437.5, weight 5.48-5.70 g, diameter 24.0 mm, minted in 1565, 1566, 1568, 1572, 1573).

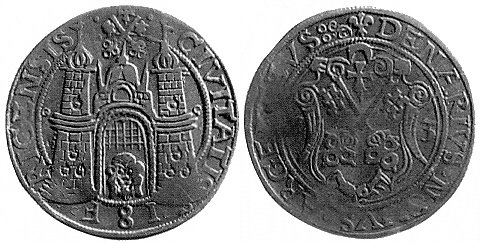
Rīga silver dālderis (weight 27.25 g, diameter 40.0 mm, minted in 1565, 1572, 1573, 1574, 1576).

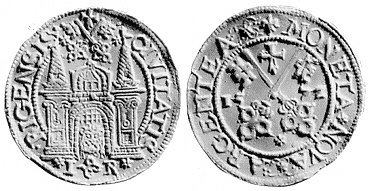
Riga three gold dukat coin (gold 986, weight 10.66 g, diameter 30.0 mm. minted in 1572).

== See also ==
- Free City of Danzig
