= Rauna Parish =

Parish of Latvia

- parish of Latvia
- Coat of arms

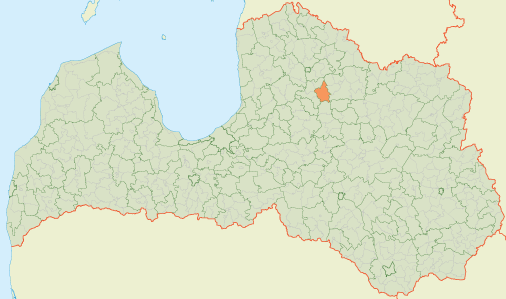
- Coordinates: 57°20′30″N 25°38′27″E
- Country: Latvia

Population (1 January 2026)
  - Total: 2,171

Rauna Parish (Latvian: Raunas pagasts) is an administrative unit of Smiltene Municipality in the Vidzeme region of Latvia (Prior to 2009, it belonged to the former Cēsis district). The administrative center is the village of Rauna.

== Towns, villages and settlements of Rauna parish ==
- Bormaņi
- Cimza
- Gaiķi
- Kauliņi
- Ķieģeļceplis
- Lisa
- Marijkalns
- Mūri
- Rauna
- Rozes
- Strīķeļi
- Stuķi
- Vieķi

== See also ==
- Jānis Cimze
- Rauna Castle
