= Battle of the Siritsa River =

1501 military conflict in Russia during Muscovite–Lithuanian Wars

- Part of the Muscovite–Lithuanian Wars
Date	27 August 1501
Location	On the Siritsa River, 10 km south from Izborsk 57°35′09″N 27°52′54″E
Result	Livonian victory

Belligerents
Grand Duchy of Moscow; Pskov Republic	Livonian Order

Commanders and leaders
Vasily Nemoy Shuysky; Daniil Shchenya	Wolter von Plettenberg

Strength
Zimin: 6,000 warriors Nolan: 40,000	Zimin: 4,000 mounted knights 2,000 foot landsknechts Nolan: 12,000

The Battle of the Siritsa River (also Seritsa) took place on 27 August 1501 between the forces of the Livonian Order under Grand Master Wolter von Plettenberg on the one side and the forces of the Grand Duchy of Moscow and Pskov Republic on the other. The Russian forces were soundly defeated.

Grand Prince Ivan III of Russia pursued expansionist policies, which strained Moscow's relations with Livonia. In 1492, Moscow built Ivangorod Fortress opposite of Narva and two years later closed down the Hanseatic office in Novgorod. Hanseatic merchants, most of them Livonians, were imprisoned. The trade through Tallinn and Tartu diminished significantly. During the Russo-Swedish War (1495–1497), Sweden captured Ivangorod and offered it to Livonia, an offer which was refused. Moscow perceived that as a Swedish–Livonian alliance. As negotiations failed, Livonia began preparing for war. In May 1500, a war broke out between Moscow and the Grand Duchy of Lithuania. On 17 May 1501, Livonia and Lithuania concluded a ten-year alliance in Vilnius. In August 1501, von Plettenberg led a Livonian army, reinforced with 3,000 mercenaries from Lübeck, towards Pskov.

The armies met on 27 August 1501 on the Siritsa River, 10 km south from Izborsk, on the western approaches to Pskov. The Pskovian regiment attacked the Livonians first but was thrown back. The Livonian artillery then destroyed the remainder of the Muscovite army despite a Russian attempt to reply with their own, insufficient, artillery force. In the battle, the smaller Livonian army defeated the Muscovite army (drawn from the cities of Moscow, Novgorod, and Tver, as well as from Pskov – which was not formally part of Muscovy until 1510) in large part due to the Order's formidable artillery park and the Russians' significant shortage of guns of any kind. The defeat prompted Moscow to modernize its army by creating standing infantry units armed with arquebus.

Livonian troops then captured Ostrov and unsuccessfully besieged Pskov. The Russians retaliated by invading and plundering eastern Livonia and defeating the Order at Helmed near Dorpat. The Order won a victory at the Battle of Smolin in September 1502. The war ended in 1503 when Lithuania sued for peace. Peace between Livonia and Moscow lasted until the Livonian War (1558–1583).

== Bibliography ==
- Zimin, Aleksandr A. (1982). "Победа при Ведроши" [Victory at Vedrosha]. Россия на рубеже XV—XVI столетий [Russia at the turn of the 15th and 16th centuries] (in Russian). Moscow: Myslʹ. (Note: The "Victory at Vedrosha" chapter covers 1498–1503.)
