= Calendar riots in Riga =

Calendar Riots in Riga were a series of uprisings by the citizens of Riga between 1584 and 1589 against the authority of the Riga Town Council and King Stephen Báthory, who had issued an order to adopt the Gregorian calendar. Citizens viewed the reform as an imposition of new restrictions, and opposition to the calendar became intertwined with a broader power struggle between the patricians (represented by the town council) and the guilds (representing burghers), as well as a new wave of Catholic persecution.

== Causes of the riots ==
On January 14, 1581, the Treaty of Drohiczyn was signed between the free city of Riga and the Polish–Lithuanian Commonwealth, which preserved certain privileges for the citizens of Riga, later known as the "Privileges of Stephen".

In 1582, the Commonwealth, under the king's decree, adopted the new calendar authorized by Pope Gregory XIII, according to which Thursday, October 4, 1582, was followed by Friday, October 15. While Catholic countries gradually implemented the new calendar over the following years, Protestant countries (such as England, Sweden, the Duchy of Prussia, the Duchy of Courland and Semigallia) and Orthodox countries (e.g., the Tsardom of Russia) continued to use the Julian calendar. The Gregorian calendar was also implemented in the Duchy of Livonia (under Counter-Reformation influence), but the city of Riga refused to comply. In 1584, the king reiterated his order specifically for Riga, threatening a fine of 10,000 ducats for non-compliance.

== Events ==
In autumn 1584, the Riga town council and the Lutheran clergy, led by senior pastor Neiner, decided to concede and celebrate Christmas according to the new calendar. This decision caused outrage among the burghers.

On Christmas Day, when Lutheran churches were nearly empty because the population did not recognize the date, a mob broke into St. James's Church during service. The mob assaulted priests, smashed windows, and destroyed items associated with Catholic worship: icons, altars, and banners were piled and burned on Kube Hill; those that didn't burn were thrown into the Daugava River (acts of vandalism affected all Catholic churches in Riga).

The rector of the Riga Cathedral School, Meller, insulted the king during a council session, prompting the Burgrave and Landvogt Nicholas Ecke to arrest him. However, a furious mob soon freed the prisoner, and went on to loot and destroy the homes of Ecke, Neiner, and the council’s syndic Gotthard Velling. The mob then stormed the homes of council members loyal to royal authority, damaging property and attacking the residents, killing two councilmen in the process.

The unrest escalated further under informal leadership from the lawyer Martin Giese and the winemaker Hans Brinken. The rebels closed the city gates and seized the municipal treasury. Armed patrols of burghers controlled the streets, preventing supporters of the patricians from organizing, while mobs looted the homes of royal supporters and Catholic churches.

For a time, the burghers held complete control over Riga. The intimidated town council signed a truce with the burghers, making concessions on religious issues, canceling the implementation of the new calendar, and limiting council authority by granting the guilds participation in city governance. The riots continued, but their nature changed into a power struggle between different citizen factions—such as between the Large Guild and the Small Guild.

At Ādaži (near Bukulti Manor), royal forces led by Jürgen von Farensbach arrived and crossed the Daugava into Spilve, where they began constructing fortifications. Martin Giese traveled to Stockholm to request Swedish protection for Riga but was refused. On December 9, 1586, King Stephen Báthory died. During the interregnum, the burghers seized all Catholic property and expelled remaining Catholics from the city. They even attempted an offensive against the royal fortifications at Spilve.

In 1589, an envoy of the new king, Sigismund III Vasa, arrived and accepted several of the burghers' demands. However, Riga was forced to arrest Giese and Brinken. After torture, they were executed as rebels on August 2, 1589. On August 26, the so-called St. Severin’s Day Agreement was concluded, restoring the old council authority but preserving certain guild rights in city administration. Riga retained the right to use the Julian calendar, and its citizens were among the last in Europe to switch to the Gregorian calendar—in 1919.
