= Albert Suerbeer =

German archbishop (c. 1200 – 1273)

Seal of Archbishop Albert Suerbeer of Prussia, Livonia, and Estonia.

Albert Suerbeer (c. 1200 – 1273) was the first Archbishop of Riga in Livonia.

== Life ==
Suerbeer was an aggressive supporter of papal power and tried to take over the whole eastern Baltic area for the Holy See. His efforts failed, however, and he was forced to submit to the Livonian branch of the Teutonic Knights.

Suerbeer was born in Cologne. He studied in Paris, received a degree of magister, and became the canon in Bremen. After the death of Albert of Riga in 1229, he was appointed Bishop of Riga by Archbishop of Bremen Gerhard of Oldenburg. The canons of Riga did not recognize his appointment and elected their own candidate Nicholas, who was confirmed by Pope Gregory IX in 1231.

In 1240, Suerbeer became Archbishop of Armagh and Primate of Ireland, where he was known as Alberic the German. After taking part in the First Council of Lyon in 1245, he left Ireland, as Pope Innocent IV needed him in Germany in his struggle against Emperor Frederick II. Upon returning to Germany, however, the Pope appointed him Archbishop of Prussia, Livonia, and Estonia, and later also a legate to Gotland, Holstein, Rügen, and Russia. In 1246 he was given also the vacant Diocese of Lübeck in Germany.

The Teutonic Knights were wary of Suerbeer and warned him to stay away from Prussia. After Bishop Nicholas of Riga died in 1253, Suerbeer finally received the Bishopric of Riga he had claimed over 10 years. According to a compromise arranged by William of Modena, Albert promised to stop his activities against the Teutonic Order. Suffragan bishoprics subordinate to Riga included Dorpat, Ösel-Wiek, Courland, Sambia, Pomesania, Warmia (Ermland), and Culmerland.

His activities regarding the proselytisation of the pagans and the foundation of a church union with the Russian principalities brought him into conflict with the Teutonic Order. While Suerbeer's proselytisation and power policy eventually yielded little success, the competing Teutonic Order attained papal support more easily than the archbishop, thanks to its supraregional presence and comparative wealth.

In 1267, however, Suerbeer allied himself with Gunzelin, a son of Count Gunzelin III of Schwerin, who had come to Livonia as a crusader. He appointed Gunzelin an advocate (governor) of his diocese which resulted in deep conflict with the Livonian Order. While Gunzelin was recruiting troops in Germany, the Order arrested Suerbeer and kept him imprisoned with only bread and water. Suerbeer was forced to recognize the authority of the Order. Suerbeer died in Riga in 1273.

Albert Suerbeer
Catholic Church titles
Preceded by Robert Archer (elect)	Archbishop of Armagh; 1240–1246	Succeeded by Reginald of Bologna
Regnal titles
Catholic Church titles
Preceded by Albert of Chiemsee	Administrator of the Prince-Bishopric of Chiemsee; 1246–1247	Succeeded by Henry of Bilversheim
Preceded by John of Lübeck	Prince-Bishop of Lübeck; 1247–1253 as Albert I	Succeeded by John of Diest
Preceded by Nicholas of Nauen	Prince-Archbishop of Riga; 1253–1273 as Albert II	Succeeded by John of Lunen
