= Alan O'Sullivan =

Irish Gaelic footballer

Personal information
- Native name: Alan Ó Súilleabháin (Irish)
- Born: 1987 (age 38–39) Killarney, Republic of Ireland

Sport
- Sport: Gaelic Football
- Position: Midfield
Clubs
- Years: Club
- Tuosist; Dr Crokes
Club titles
- Kerry titles: 4
- Munster titles: 2
- All-Ireland Titles: 1
Inter-county
- Years: County
- Kerry

Alan O Sullivan (born 1987) is a Gaelic footballer from County Kerry. He has played with Kerry at every level and with his club side Tuosist and later Dr Crokes.

== Club ==
At club level he helped Tuosist to the County Novice title in 2008.

He later joined Dr Crokes in Killarney. It was a successful move as in his first season he won a Kerry Senior Football Championship in 2013, he later added a Munster Senior Club Football Championship. He won play a part as the club won three titles in a row between 2016 and 2018, added Munster titles in 2016 and 2018. On St Patricks Day 2017 he was part of the Corkes team who won the All-Ireland Senior Club Football Championship in Croke Park.

== Minor ==
He first played with the Kerry GAA minor team in 2004 winning a Munster Championship as a sub, he was also part of the panel that lost the All Ireland final to Tyrone. He was a regular member of the team in 2005 but had little success.

== Under 21 ==
He then moved on to the Under 21 team, he played in 2006 & 07 but had little success. In 2008 he played a key role at midfield as Kerry won a first Munster title since 2002 and later a first All Ireland title since 1998 after overcoming Kildare.

== Junior ==
In 2007 he joined the Junior side but had little success. Following on from his Under 21 success in 2008 he again played with the Junior team winning a Munster title, Kerry later lost out to Roscommon in the All Ireland semi final. After no success in 2009 Kerry were back as Munster Champions in 2010 with O Sullivan again playing a key role, they later lost out to Sigo in the All Ireland final. After playing no part in 2011 he won a third Munster Championship and later a first All Ireland at Junior level after beating Mayo in the final.

== Senior ==
O'Sullivan's only senior appearance for Kerry came during the 2010 National Football League.
