= Bill Schoening =

American sportscaster

Bill Schoening is an American sportscaster who was the radio play-by-play voice of the San Antonio Spurs from 2001 through 2025. Schoening announced his retirement from the Spurs at the end of the 2024-2025 season, after calling 2,280 consecutive games over the course of 24 seasons. Prior to his work with the Spurs, Schoening broadcast for the Texas Longhorns for 12 years, calling football, basketball, and baseball games.

Schoening is a four-time winner of the Associated Press "Top Texas Play-by-Play Award," and also won the 2014 Texas Sportscaster of the Year Award from the National Sportscasters and Sportswriters Association. In August 2022, he was announced as an inductee into the Texas Radio Hall of Fame.

In addition to his work with the Longhorns and Spurs, Schoening has also broadcast National Football League, Major League Baseball, and arena football games. Outside of sports broadcasting, he has released multiple CDs of original songs as a singer-songwriter, and has also published a book entitled "Stories, Sports, and Songs: Tales and Tunes by a Play by Play Lifer."

== Early life ==
Schoening grew up in Philadelphia, Pennsylvania, and decided at an early age that he wanted to be a broadcaster. One of his early influences was By Saam, who was broadcasting games for the Philadelphia Phillies when Schoening was growing up. Schoening attended West Catholic High School and one year at Temple University, before transferring to the American Academy of Broadcasting in Philadelphia. After graduating from the six-month program, he got his first job in radio in Illinois.

== Early career ==
Schoening worked in Pana, Illinois for about a year, before moving to Lamesa, Texas. In Lamesa, he did radio broadcasts for the Lamesa High School Golden Tornados, including football, basketball, and baseball games. He spent three years in Lamesa before moving again, this time to Huntsville, Texas.

Schoening began in Huntsville at age 23, broadcasting games for Sam Houston State University, including basketball, football, and a little baseball. In addition to his sports broadcasting, Schoening also covered the state prison system in Huntsville, including reporting on 29 executions and personally witnessing six. He stayed in Huntsville for six years, from 1983 to 1989.

== University of Texas ==
In 1989, Schoening was hired to broadcast sports for the University of Texas in Austin. During his first three years in Austin, Schoening served as the color analyst on Texas Longhorns football and basketball, with play-by-play announcers Brad Sham and Jerry Trupiano. After Sham and Trupiano left, Schoening was hired to take over play-by-play for both Longhorn football and basketball, a position he would hold for nine years (through 2001). During this time, Schoening's primary color commentator was Craig Way. Schoening also did play-by-play for Longhorn baseball for all 12 years he was in Austin.

During his time in Austin, Schoening also hosted an afternoon sports radio talk show, first at KLBJ, and then at KVET, after the latter gained the rights to broadcast Longhorn games. He sometimes had co-hosts for these shows, including Jeff Ward and Craig Way. One of these talk shows titled "Sportsday," which Schoening co-hosted with Ward, won a 1996 "Best of Austin" award from the Austin Chronicle for "Best Talk Radio Show."

== San Antonio Spurs ==
In September 2001, Schoening was hired as the radio voice of the San Antonio Spurs. Because of the timing of the hire so close to college football season, Schoening called games for both the Spurs and Longhorn football during the fall of 2001.

Schoening served as the play-by-play voice of the Spurs for 24 seasons, and during that time the Spurs won four NBA championships (in 2003, 2005, 2007 and 2014). As part of his 2,280 game "iron man" streak without missing a broadcast, he was on hand for every game of the Spurs Big Three (Tim Duncan, Tony Parker, and Manu Ginobili) era. At the time of his retirement, the 2,280 consecutive games called streak was the second-longest active streak in the NBA among team broadcasters, second only to Steve Holman's streak of more than 3,000 consecutive games for the Atlanta Hawks. (The all-time record is Chick Hearn's 3,338 consecutive games.)

Schoening announced his retirement from the Spurs at the end of the 2024-25 NBA season, saying it was time to "step away from full time broadcasting and pursue some other interests like mentorship, volunteer work and time with family." However, Schoening also stated that he was not retiring from broadcasting completely, and was hoping to call sports that he otherwise didn't have the opportunity to do during his Spurs career, including college baseball and football.

== Personal ==
Schoening lives in Austin with his wife, Gerry. They have two sons: Eric, who is a meteorologist with the National Weather Service in Salt Lake City, and Karl, a sports broadcaster who has called a wide variety of sporting events, including the Austin Spurs, the University of Texas at San Antonio, and high school football.
