= Johann Schöning =

Mayor of Riga

Johann Schöning (c. 1458–1502) (also Schonynk) was mayor of Riga. In 1476 he was elected as a member of the Riga council. He is considered one of the most important representatives of the city of Riga at the end of the 15th Century, especially in Hanseatic League and Livonian Landtag, but also as an envoy to Sweden and Russia.

He wrote two books, "Joh. Schöninck's grott Realbuch", a chronicle of the events between 1486 and 1498, and a diary about the Hanseatic Days in Lubeck from 1487. In recognition of his services to the city of Riga in 1488, he received an estate across the Daugava River. His son Thomas Schöning served as Archbishop of Riga.
