= Daniil Shchenya =

Russian military commander

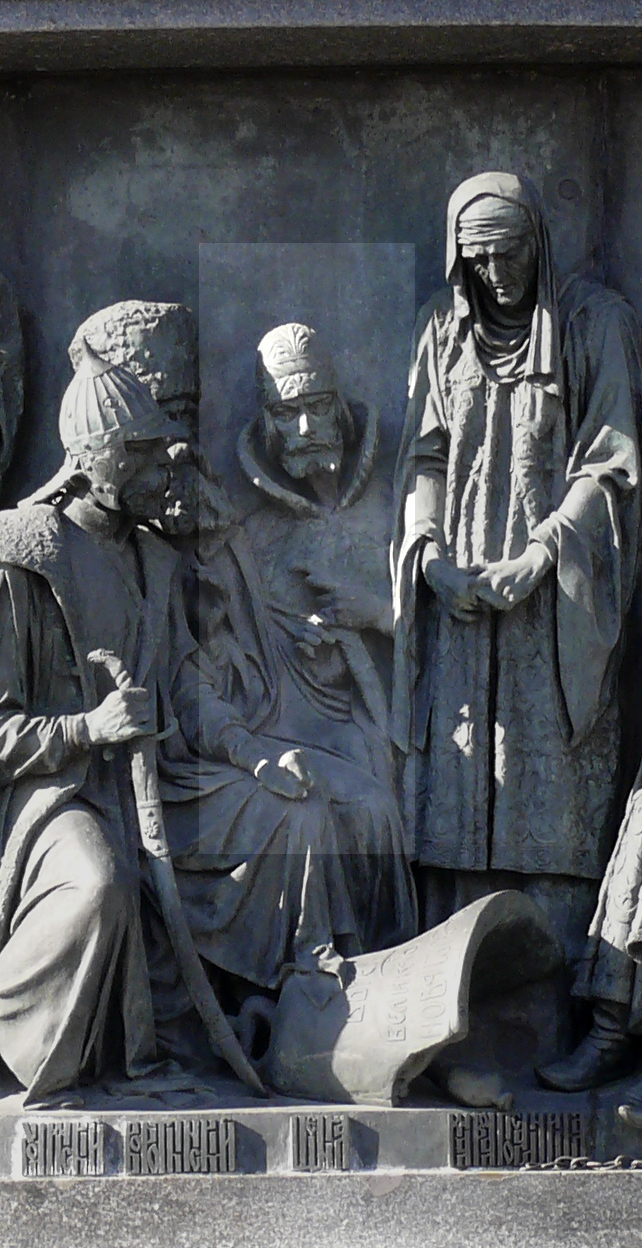
- Shchenya as depicted on the Millennium of Russia monument in Novgorod
- Died: after 1515
- Allegiance: Grand Duchy of Moscow
- Conflicts: Siege of Khlynov; Russo-Swedish War (1495–97); Muscovite–Lithuanian Wars; Battle of Vedrosha

Prince Daniil Vasiliyevich Shchenya (Russian: Даниил Васильевич Щеня; died after 1515) was a Russian military leader during the reigns of Ivan III and Vasili III.

== Career ==
Shchenya was a Gediminid princeling whose great grandfather was a son of Patrikas, who settled in Moscow and married a sister of the grand duke. Shchenya was among the boyars who accompanied Ivan III on his visit to Novgorod in 1475.

In 1489, the prince and his army of 64,000 men besieged and captured the city of Kirov (then known as Khlynov) of the Vyatka Land, the inhabitants of which had often pillaged northern Grand Duchy of Moscow. Khlynov notables and merchants were resettled in other Muscovite towns.

Shchenya took an active part in the Muscovite–Lithuanian Wars against the Grand Duchy of Lithuania and border disputes and skirmishes, which had preceded the war. In 1493, Shchenya and his relative Prince Vasili Ivanovich Patrikeyev (also known as Vassian Kosoy) captured the city of Vyazma and transferred its princes to Moscow. During the Russo-Swedish War (1496–1499) his army devastated Finland. In 1499, under the leadership of Prince Daniil Kholmsky, Shchenya defeated the Grand Hetman of Lithuania Konstanty Ostrogski in the Battle of Vedrosha and took him prisoner.

In 1501, his army was crushed in the Battle of the Siritsa River by Wolter von Plettenberg, master of the Livonian Order and ally of the Lithuanian ruler Alexander Jagiellon. After the fall of Ivan Yuriyevich Patrikeyev, and his son-in-law Semeon Ivanovich Ryapolovsky, Shchenya took the post of the second voyevoda of Moscow. In 1508, he and Dmitriy Shemyachich unsuccessfully sieged Orsha. That same year Shchenya became the first voyevoda of Moscow after the fall of Daniil Kholmsky. In 1514 Shchenya crowned his military career by capturing Smolensk from the Lithuanians.

Shchenya was last mentioned in 1515, when he took positions against the Lithuanian offensive at Dorogobuzh.
