= Wilhelm von Brandenburg =

Catholic Archbishop of Riga (1539–1561)

His Excellency, the Most Reverend Wilhelm von Brandenburg
- Archbishop of Riga
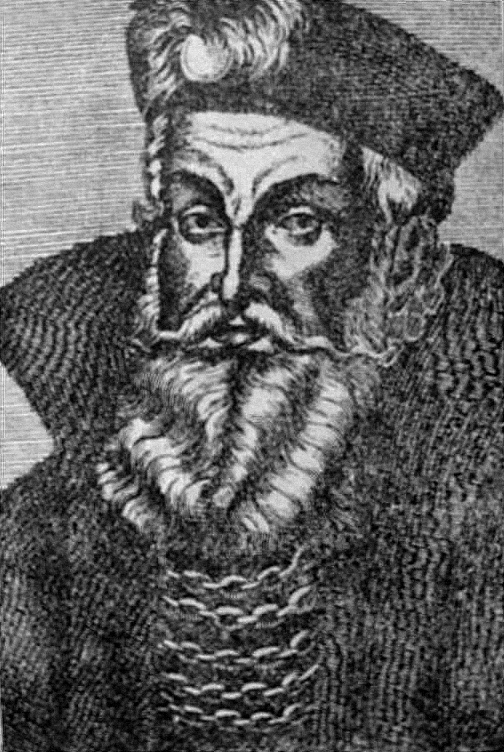
- Wilhelm of Brandenburg-Ansbach, the last Archbishop of Riga
- Church: Roman Catholic
- Installed: 10 August 1539
- Term ended: 1561
- Predecessor: Thomas Schöning
- Successor: none

Personal details
- Born: 30 June 1498 Ansbach, Margraviate of Brandenburg-Ansbach, Holy Roman Empire (now in Bavaria, Germany)
- Died: 4 February 1563 (aged 64) Riga
- Buried: Riga Cathedral

Wilhelm von Brandenburg (30 June 1498 – 4 February 1563) was a Latvian Catholic prelate who served as Archbishop of Riga from 1539 to 1561.

A member of the House of Hohenzollern, Wilhelm was the son of Frederick I, Margrave of Brandenburg-Ansbach, the brother of Albert, Duke of Prussia, and the grandson of Albert III Achilles, Elector of Brandenburg and Casimir IV Jagiellon.

After William's administration as Prince-bishop ended during the Livonian War, Riga became a Free City (1561–1581). He died there on 4 February 1563 was buried in Riga Cathedral.

== Ancestry ==
Ancestors of Wilhelm von Brandenburg

8. Frederick I, Elector of Brandenburg (1371–1440)
4. Albrecht III, Elector of Brandenburg (1414–1486)
9. Elisabeth of Bavaria-Landshut (1383–1442)
2. Frederick I, Margrave of Brandenburg-Ansbach (1460–1536)
10. Frederick II, Elector of Saxony (1412–1464)
5. Anna of Saxony (1437–1512)
11. Margaret of Austria (1416–1486)
1. Wilhelm of Brandenburg-Ansbach-Kulmbach (1498–1563)
12. Władysław II Jagiełło of Poland (1362–1434)
6. Casimir IV of Poland (1427–1492)
13. Sophia of Halshany (1405–1461)
3. Sophia of Poland (1464–1512)
14. Albert II of Germany (1397–1439)
7. Elisabeth of Austria (1435–1505)
15. Elizabeth of Luxembourg (1409–1442)

Catholic Church titles
| Preceded by Thomas Schöning | Prince-Archbishop of Riga; 1539–1563 | Succeeded by none |
