= Thomas Schöning =

Archbishop of Riga (died 1539)

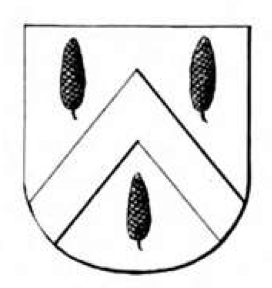
Coins minted in Riga between 1528 and 1539 bore this family coat of arms of Archbishop of Riga Thomas Schöning - two beams at angle with three linden trees.

Thomas Schöning (born probably in Riga – 11 August 1539 in Kokenhusen) was archbishop of Riga. He was a member of a prominent Riga burgher family and son of Johann Schöning. He studied at the University of Rostock between 1499 and 1500. Schöning was notable for the dating of coins. During his reign from 1528 to 1539, mark, shilling, and pfenning coins from Riga bore the family shield of Thomas Schöning.

His tenure was marked by religious and political tension: the Reformation was gaining strength in Livonia, and the city of Riga was increasingly adopting Lutheranism. Schöning remained loyal to the Catholic Church, which made his position difficult and led him to reside mostly at the archbishop’s palace in Kokenhusen rather than in Riga itself.

He found unusual support in Duke Albert of Prussia, who was part of the Protestant movement. Duke Albrecht recommended that Schöning appoint the duke's brother, Wilhelm von Brandenburg, as his coadjutor (assistant) and eventual successor. His body was buried in the parish church of Kokenhusen.

Eventually, the Archbishopric of Riga and the Livonian Order were dissolved in 1561 after the conversion of the territory from Catholicism to Lutheranism at the beginning of Swedish rule.

== Sources ==
- Philipp Schwartz (1891). "Schöning, Thomas" . Allgemeine Deutsche Biographie (in German). Vol. 32. Leipzig: Duncker & Humblot. pp. 312–313.

Catholic Church titles
Preceded by Johannes VII Blankenfeld	Bishop of Livonia; 1528–1539	Succeeded by Wilhelm von Brandenburg
