= Archbishopric of Riga =

Medieval Catholic state in present-day Latvia (1186-1561)

Coordinates: 56°58′N 24°08′E

Archbishopric of Riga Archiepiscopatus Rigensis (Latin) Erzbisdom Riga (Low German)
- 1186–1561
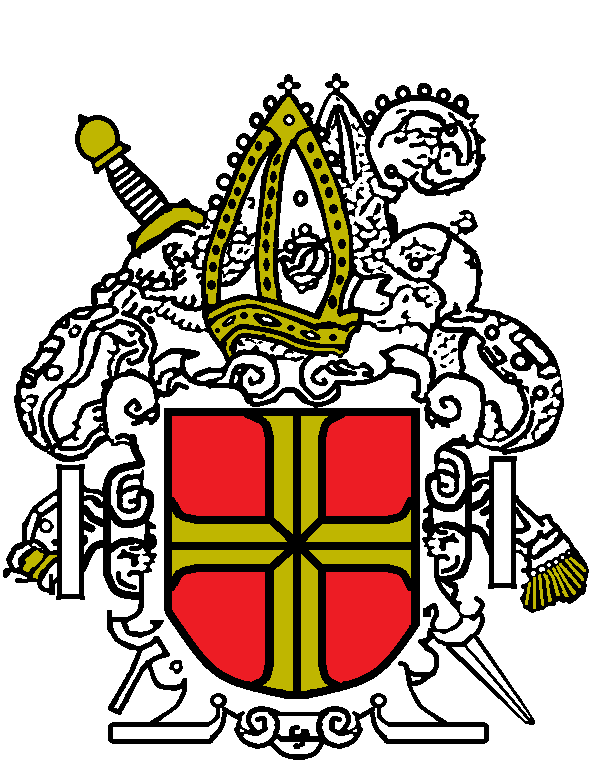
- Coat of arms

- Seal

- Archbishopric of Riga (in yellow), shown within Terra Mariana
- Status: Prince-Bishopric of Terra Mariana
- Capital: Riga
- Common languages: Latin; Low German; Livonian; Latvian
- Religion: Roman Catholic
- Government: Theocracy
- Archbishop of Riga
  - 1245–73: Albert Suerbeer (first)
  - 1539–63: Wilhelm von Brandenburg (last)
- Historical era: Middle Ages
  - Established: 1186
  - Disestablished: 1561
- Currency: Livonian Penny; Livonian Schilling
Preceded by
Ancient Estonia
Principality of Jersika
Principality of Koknese
Tālava
Succeeded by
Duchy of Livonia
Free City of Riga
- Today part of: Latvia

The Archbishopric of Riga (Latin: Archiepiscopatus Rigensis, Low German: Erzbisdom Riga) was a Catholic diocese and civil government in Medieval Livonia, subject to the Holy See. It was established in 1186 and ended in 1561.

== History ==
The diocese was established in 1186 as the Bishopric of Livonia at Ikšķile; after its seat was moved to Riga, it became the Bishopric of Riga in 1202 and was elevated to an archbishopric in 1255.

The archbishops of Riga were also the secular rulers of Riga until 1561 when during the Reformation the territory converted from Catholicism to Lutheranism and all church territories were secularized. The see was restored as a diocese of the Catholic Church in 1918 and raised into an archdiocese in 1923.

== Bishops and Archbishops of Riga ==
Bishopric of Livonia (Bishopric of Üxküll) 1186–1255
1186–1196	Saint Meinhard
1196–1198	Berthold of Hanover
1199–1202	Albert of Riga
Bishopric of Riga 1202–1255
1202–1229	Albert of Riga
1229–1253	Nikolaus von Nauen
1245–1255	Albert Suerbeer
Archbishopric of Riga 1255–1561
1255–1273	Albert Suerbeer
1273–1284	Johannes I of Lune
1285–1294	Johannes II of Vechten
1294–1300	Johannes III of Schwerin
1300–1302	Isarnus Tacconi of Fontiès-d'Aude
1303–1310	Jens Grand titular, never came to Riga
1304–1341	Friedrich von Pernstein
1341–1347	Engelbert von Dolen
1348–1369	Bromhold von Vyffhusen
1370–1374	Siegfried Blomberg
1374–1393	Johannes IV von Sinten
1393–1418	Johannes V von Wallenrodt
1418–1424	Johannes Ambundi
1424–1448	Henning Scharpenberg
1448–1479	Silvester Stodewescher
1479–1484	Sede vacante (empty seat)
1484–1509	Michael Hildebrand
1509–1524	Jasper Linde
1524–1527	Johannes VII Blankenfeld
1528–1539	Thomas Schöning
1539–1563	Wilhelm von Brandenburg

A new Bishopric of Livonia was established in Latgalia in 1621 during the Inflanty Voivodeship of the Polish–Lithuanian Commonwealth.

== Coinage ==
The Archbishops of Riga were innovators in the field of minting currency, reviving techniques abandoned since the collapse of Rome. The names of individual archbishops after 1418, as well as the years of their respective reigns, are stamped on Livonian pennies excavated at archaeological sites. In many cases, this is the only biographical data available. No Livonian pennies before 1418 have been found.

== See also ==
- Bishopric of Courland
- Bishopric of Dorpat
- Bishopric of Ösel-Wiek
- Bishopric of Reval
- Livonian Crusade
- Livonian Brothers of the Sword
- Monastic state of the Teutonic Knights
