= 1508 =

1508 in various calendars
- Gregorian calendar: 1508; MDVIII
- Ab urbe condita: 2261
- Armenian calendar: 957; ԹՎ ՋԾԷ
- Assyrian calendar: 6258
- Balinese saka calendar: 1429–1430
- Bengali calendar: 914–915
- Berber calendar: 2458
- English Regnal year: 23 Hen. 7 – 24 Hen. 7
- Buddhist calendar: 2052
- Burmese calendar: 870
- Byzantine calendar: 7016–7017
- Chinese calendar: 丁卯年 (Fire Rabbit); 4205 or 3998 — to — 戊辰年 (Earth Dragon); 4206 or 3999
- Coptic calendar: 1224–1225
- Discordian calendar: 2674
- Ethiopian calendar: 1500–1501
- Hebrew calendar: 5268–5269
- Hindu calendars
- Vikram Samvat: 1564–1565
- Shaka Samvat: 1429–1430
- Kali Yuga: 4608–4609
- Holocene calendar: 11508
- Igbo calendar: 508–509
- Iranian calendar: 886–887
- Islamic calendar: 913–914
- Japanese calendar: Eishō 5 (永正５年)
- Javanese calendar: 1425–1426
- Julian calendar: 1508; MDVIII
- Korean calendar: 3841
- Minguo calendar: 404 before ROC 民前404年
- Nanakshahi calendar: 40
- Thai solar calendar: 2050–2051
- Tibetan calendar: མེ་མོ་ཡོས་ལོ་ (female Fire-Hare); 1634 or 1253 or 481 — to — ས་ཕོ་འབྲུག་ལོ་ (male Earth-Dragon); 1635 or 1254 or 482

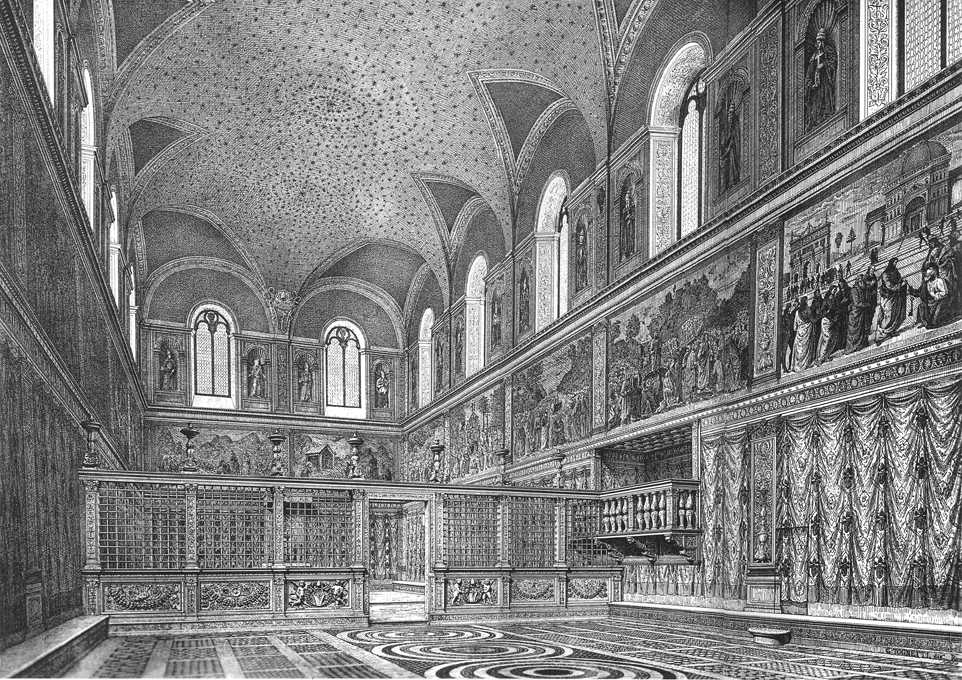
May 8: Michelangelo Simoni signs contract with Vatican to turn Sistine Chapel ceiling into a painting

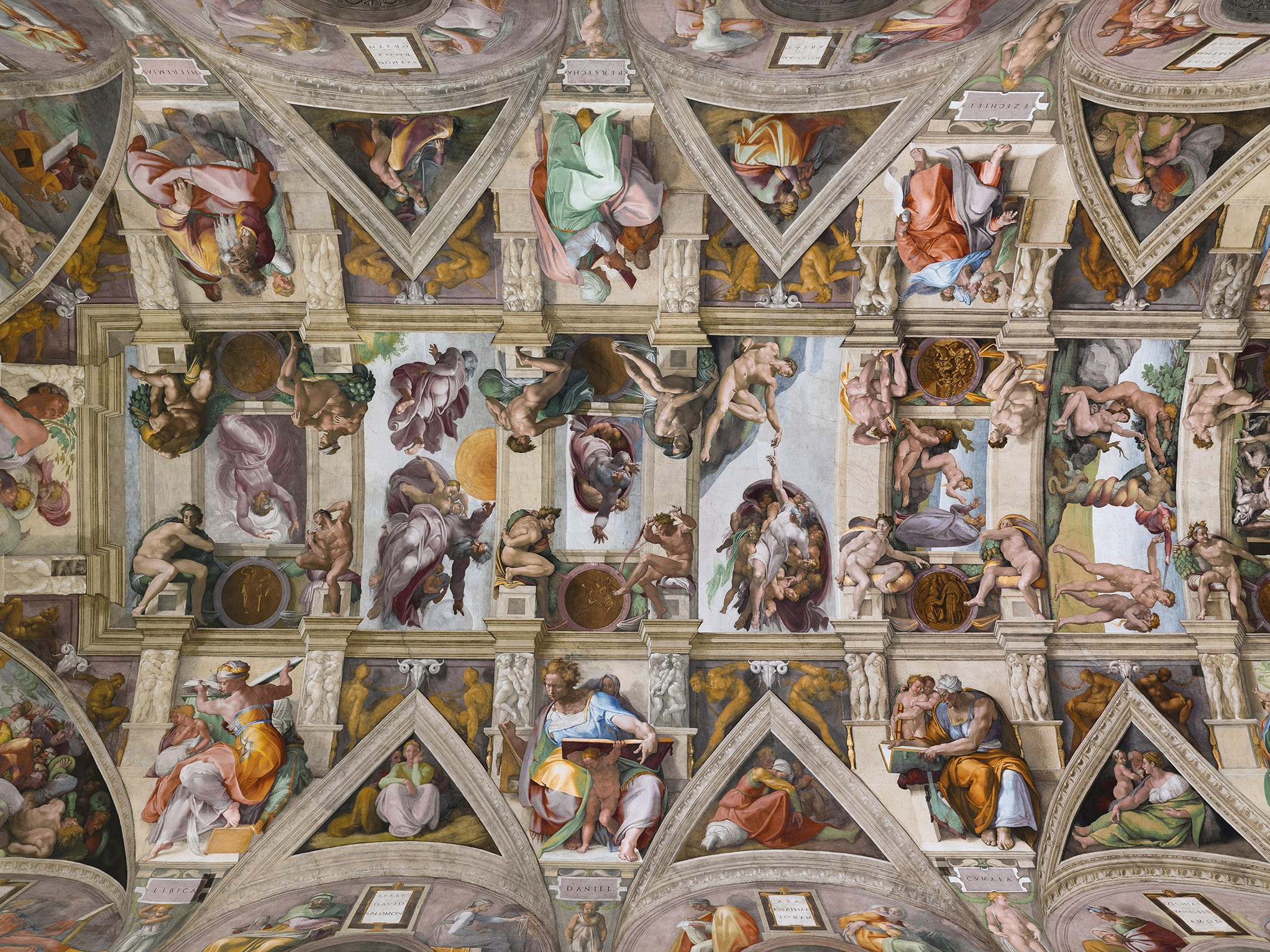
December: Sistine Chapel.

Year 1508 (MDVIII) was a leap year starting on Saturday of the Julian calendar.

== Events ==
=== January–March ===
- January 24 – Maximilian, King of the Romans, requests permission to march to Rome through Venetian territory, but is denied and begins his Italienzug.
- February 2 – During the Glinski rebellion, Lithuanian noble Mykolas Glinskis attacks Grodno (now in Belarus) and decapitates Jan Zabrzeziński, the top ally of Grand Duke Alexander.
- February 4 – Maximilian, King of the Romans, proclaims himself Holy Roman Emperor at the Italian city of Trento, after having been blocked by Venice from traveling to Rome to be crowned by Pope Julius II.
- February 20 – Maximilian I, Holy Roman Emperor, attacks the Republic of Venice and sack Ampezzo the next day.
- February 28 – Louis V becomes the new prince elector of the Palatinate upon the death of his father, Philip.
- March 2 – The Republic of Venice defeats Maximilian I in the Battle of Cadore.
- March 5 – La Cassaria by Ludovico Ariosto, the first Italian language comedy, is premiered at Ferrara.
- March 13 – The oldest annual foot race in Europe, the "Red Hose Race", is run for the first time, taking place in Scotland at Carnwath, Lanarkshire.
- March 18 – Wilhelm IV becomes the new Duke of Bavaria upon the death of his father, Albrecht IV.
- March 22
  - Working from the house of Piero di Braccio Martelli at Florence, Leonardo da Vinci begins writing his "collection without order" of his scientific discoveries.
  - Ferdinand II of Aragon appoints Florentine merchant Amerigo Vespucci to the post of Chief Navigator of Spain.

=== April–June ===
- April 23 – Prince Mihnea cel Rău, son of Vlad the Impaler, becomes the Voivode of Wallachia, with a palace at Târgoviște (now in Romania), upon the death of his cousin Radu IV the Great.
- May 8 – Italian renaissance artist Michelangelo di Lodovico Buonarroti Simoni of Florence signs a contract with the Vatican to paint the Sistine Chapel ceiling, in return for a promised fee of 3,000 gold ducats (equivalent in 2023 to more than U.S. $600,000).
- June 4 – The coronation of Prince Lajos as the designated successor to his father, King Vladislaus II of Hungary, takes place in Székesfehérvár.
- June 6 – Holy Roman Emperor Maximilian I signs a humiliating armistice with the Republic of Venice, which for the moment stops any of his further plans for Italy.

=== July–September ===
- July 23 – Upon the death of his father, King Oxlahuh-Tz'i, Hun-Iqʼ becomes one of the two kings of Guatemala's Kaqchikel Maya civilization. Hun-Iqʼ reigns jointly with King Kablahuh-Tihax until the latter's death on February 4.
- July 27 – The process of removing the former layers of paint on the ceiling of the Sistine Chapel is completed, and Michelangelo begins the next phase of marking the surface for painting.
- July 31 – The Emperor of Ethiopia, Na'od, dies in battle. His son Lebna Dengel takes on the regnal name of Dawit II, and becomes the new emperor starting on August 11.
- August 12 – The Spanish settlement of Puerto Rico begins when Juan Ponce de León lands on the island. Upon his arrival, Ponce is welcomed by Agüeybaná I, the island's leader a Cacique of the Taíno people. The Spanish explorer soon settles and founds the city of Caparra, near what is now the town of Guaynabo.
- September 11 – England is left without a Roman Catholic Cardinal protector when Cardinal Galeotto Franciotti della Rovere dies suddenly. England's King Henry VII dies seven months later before the monarchy and the Pope can agree on a new cardinal protector. The King's successor, Henry VIII, later abolishes the office entirely after Lorenzo Campeggio dies in the course of the English Reformation and the creation of the Church of England.

=== October–December ===
- October 8 – An inconclusive peace treaty is signed to end the third of the Muscovite–Lithuanian Wars.
- October 24 – King Louis XII convenes court at the Parlement de Normandie building in Rouen.
- November 1 – At the age of 16, Prince Wolfgang of the House of Ascania becomes the new ruler of the German principality of Anhalt-Köthen, succeeding his father Waldemar VI. In 1521, he will meet Martin Luther and, in 1525, will introduce the Reformation to his principality, making Anhalt-Köthen only the second nation (after the Electorate of Saxony) to officially adopt Protestantism.
- November 29 – Astronomer Mikołaj Kopernik of Poland is granted benefits by Pope Julius II in order to perform his work.
- December 10 – The League of Cambrai is formed as an alliance against the Republic of Venice, between Pope Julius II, Louis XII of France, Maximilian I, Holy Roman Emperor and Ferdinand II of Aragon.
- December 29 – Battle of Dabul: Portuguese forces, under the command of Francisco de Almeida, attack Khambhat.
- December – Michelangelo begins painting the Sistine Chapel ceiling in the Holy See of Rome, on a commission by Pope Julius II (signed May 10).

== Births ==
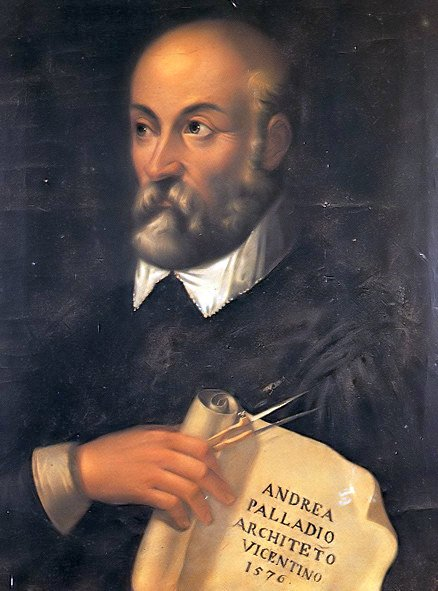
Andrea Palladio

- February 17 – Bernardo Salviati, Italian Catholic cardinal (d. 1568)
- March 6 – Mirza Nasir-ud-Din Muhammad, emperor of the Mughal Empire (d. 1556)
- April 3 – Jean Daurat, French writer and scholar (d. 1588)
- April 5 – Ercole II d'Este, Duke of Ferrara, Italian noble (d. 1559)
- April 23 – Georg Sabinus, German writer (d. 1560)
- May 8 – Charles Wriothesley, English Officer of Arms (d. 1562)
- June 8 or June 9 – Primož Trubar, Slovenian Protestant reformer who lays the foundations for the Slovenian written language (d. 1586)
- June 12 – Hedwig of Münsterberg-Oels, German noble (d. 1531)
- June 13 – Alessandro Piccolomini, Italian humanist and philosopher from Siena (d. 1579)
- June 29 – Balthasar of Hanau-Münzenberg, German nobleman (d. 1534)
- September 19 – Maria Paleologa, Italian noblewoman (d. 1530)
- September 23 – Simon Sulzer, Swiss theologian (d. 1585)
- September 25 – Francisco Mendoza de Bobadilla, Spanish Catholic cardinal (d. 1566)
- November 23 – Francis, Duke of Brunswick-Lüneburg, youngest son of Henry the Middle (d. 1549)
- November 26 – Cristofano Gherardi, Italian painter (d. 1556)
- November 30 – Andrea Palladio, Italian architect (d. 1580)
- December 8 – Gemma Frisius, Dutch mathematician and cartographer (d. 1555)
- December 21 – Thomas Naogeorgus, German playwright (d. 1563)
- December 24 – Pietro Carnesecchi, Italian humanist (d. 1567)
- date unknown
  - Livio Agresti, Italian painter (d. 1580)
  - Matsunaga Hisahide, Japanese daimyo (d. 1577)
  - Marin Držić, Croatian playwright (d. 1567)
- possible
  - Jane Seymour, third queen of Henry VIII (d. 1537)

== Deaths ==
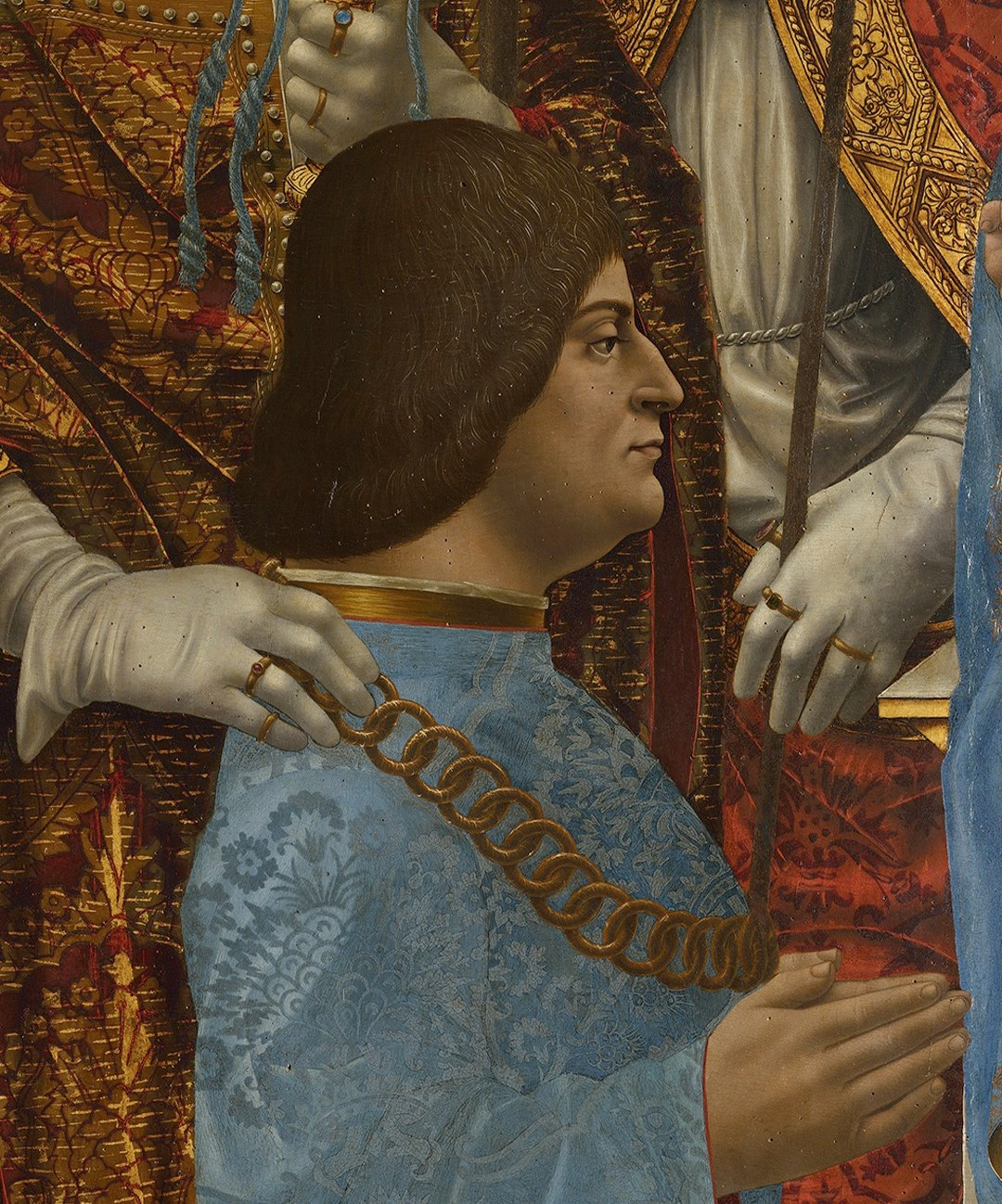
Ludovico Sforza

- February – Robert Lauder of the Bass, governor of Berwick-on-Tweed (b. c. 1440)
- February 4 – Conrad Celtes, German humanist (b. 1459)
- February 16 – Giovanni II Bentivoglio, tyrant of Bologna (b. 1443)
- February 27 – James, Duke of Rothesay, heir to the throne of Scotland (b. 1507)
- February 28 – Philip, Elector Palatine (b. 1448)
- March 18 – Albert IV of Bavaria (b. 1447)
- March – Lourenço de Almeida, Portuguese explorer
- April 10 – Guidobaldo da Montefeltro, Italian condottiero (b. 1472)
- May 21 – Giles Daubeney, 1st Baron Daubeney (b. 1451)
- May 27 – Ludovico Sforza, Duke of Milan (b. 1452)
- June 6 – Ercole Strozzi, Italian poet (b. 1473)
- June 15 – Bernard Stewart, 4th Lord of Aubigny (b. c. 1452)
- July 28 or July 29 – Robert Blackadder, Bishop of Glasgow
- July 31 – Na'od, Emperor of Ethiopia (in battle)
- August 3 – Raphael de Mercatellis, abbot and bibliophile (b. 1437)
- September 23 – Beatrice of Naples, queen consort of Hungary (b. 1457)
- October 10 – János Thurzó, Hungarian businessman (b. 1437)
- October 18 – Patrick Hepburn, 1st Earl of Bothwell, Lord High Admiral of Scotland
- October 23 – Edmund de Ros, 10th Baron de Ros, English politician (b. 1446)
- November 25 – Ursula of Brandenburg, Duchess of Münsterberg-Oels and Countess of Glatz (b. 1450)
- December 10 – René II, Duke of Lorraine (b. 1451)
- December 16 – Henry the Younger of Stolberg, Stadtholder of Friesland (1506–1508) (b. 1467)
- December 22 – Eric II, Duke of Mecklenburg (b. 1483)
- date unknown
  - Isaac Abravanel, Portuguese statesman, philosopher and theologian (b. 1437)
  - Mahmud Khan (Moghul Khan), Khan of Tashkent
  - Micheletto Corella, Valencian condottieri
  - Damkhat Reachea, emperor of Cambodia
  - Ahmad al-Wansharisi, North African Islamic jurist and theologian
