= Klyetsk =

Town in Minsk Region, Belarus

Klyetsk Клецк
- Town
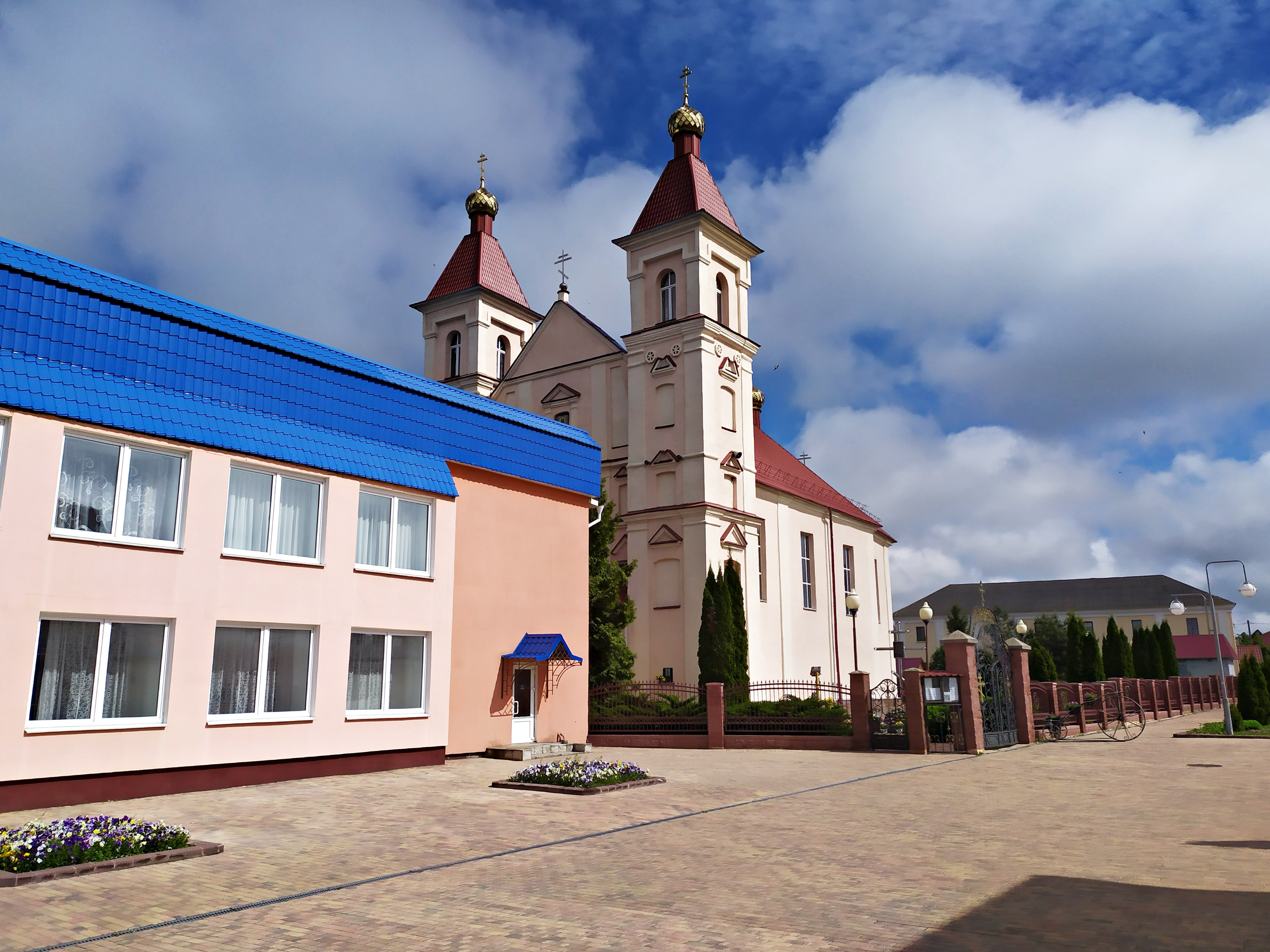

- Flag Coat of arms

- Location of Klyetsk in Belarus
- Coordinates: 53°3′49″N 26°38′14″E
- Country: Belarus
- Region: Minsk Region
- District: Klyetsk District
- Founded: 11th century

Population (2026)
  - Total: 11,072
- Time zone: UTC+3 (MSK)
- Postal code: 222531
- Area code: +375 1793
- License plate: 5
- Website: http://www.kletsk.minsk-region.by/

Klyetsk or Kletsk (Note: Belarusian: Клецк, romanized: Klieck; Russian: Клецк; Polish: Kleck; Yiddish: קלעצק.) is a town in Minsk Region, Belarus. It serves as the administrative center of Klyetsk District. Klyetsk is located on the Lan River. As of 2026, it has a population of 11,072.

== History ==
The town was founded in the 11th century by the Dregoviches, who erected a large fort and a tribal centre there. In the 14th century the town became part of the Grand Duchy of Lithuania and then part of the Polish–Lithuanian Commonwealth in the wake of the Polish–Lithuanian Unions. In the 1506 Battle of Kleck, the Polish–Lithuanian forces under Michał Gliński defeated the Tartar armies and saved the town from being pillaged. Soon afterwards, the town became a property of the Radziwiłł magnate family, who started to attract Jewish settlers to the area.

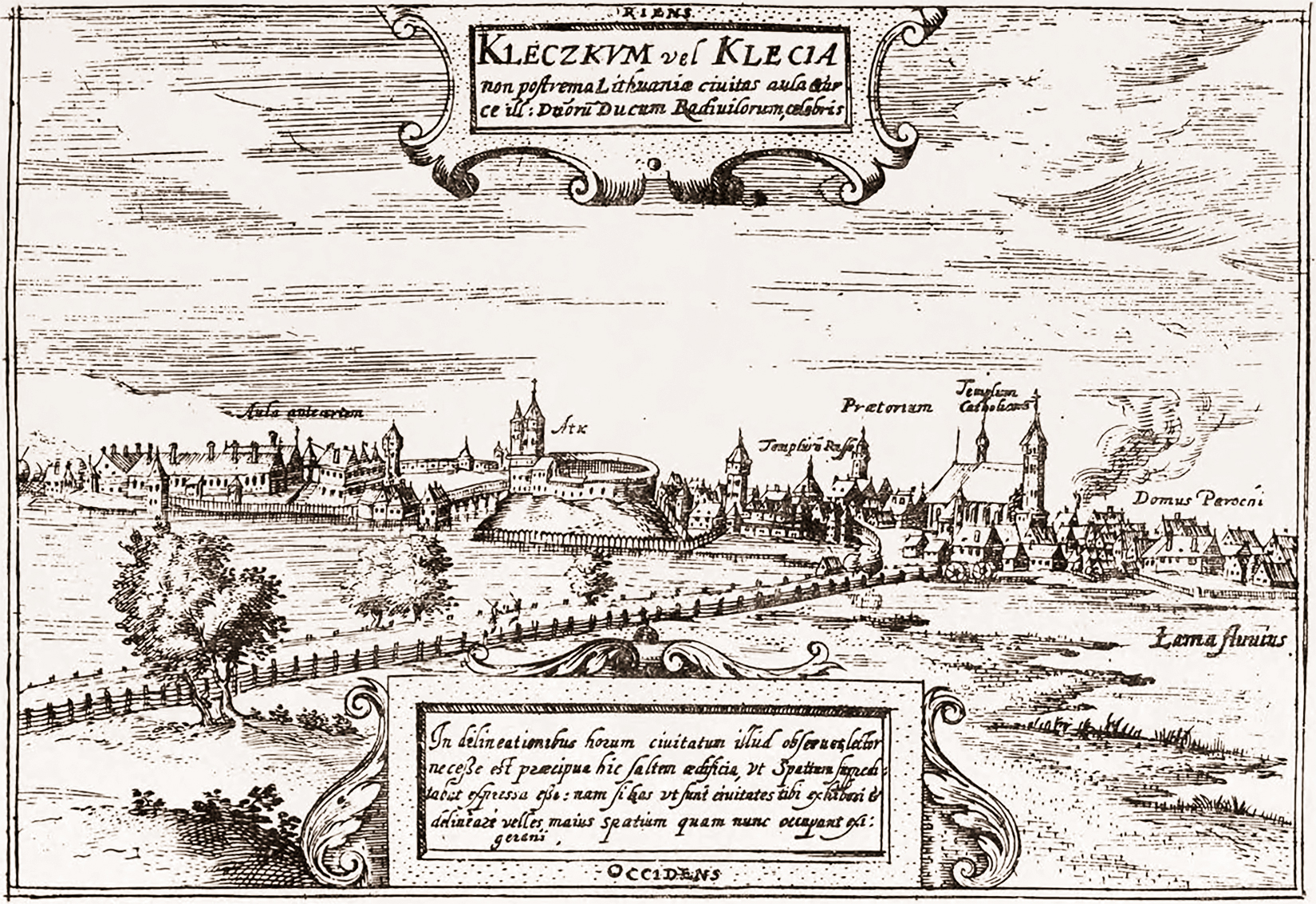
17th-century panorama

The earliest known mention of the local Jewish community is a document dated 5 September 1522, issued by King Sigismund I the Old of Poland. In it, the monarch awarded for three years to Isaac Jesofovitch, a Jew of Brest, for the sum of 300 times sixty grosz a lease of the inns and other sources of revenue in Klyetsk. The next mention of the Kletsk community, as it was known in Yiddish, is found in a document dated 21 January 1529, which imposes military duties on its inhabitants, as well as on those of other towns. On 15 June 1542 the boyar Grishko Kochevich brought suit against Zachariah Markovich, a Jew of Kletsk, the latter's oxen having broken into Grishko's field and injured the growing grain; the court awarded to Grishko twelve "ruble groschen" damages.

A census taken in 1552-55 shows that the Jewish householders lived chiefly on Wilna street, on the Sloboda, and owned gardens in the suburbs. Kletsk is mentioned in the assessment on the Lithuanian communities in 1566, and from its small proportionate assessment it appears that the community was not important at that time.

In 1586 the town became the capital of Radziwiłł's ordynacja, which sparked the gradual development of the town into a regional centre of commerce. By the end of the following century the number of Jews grew significantly; the town was also one of the notable centre of Calvinism, sponsored by the Radziwiłł family.

The first rabbi of Kletsk was Judah ben Löb, who also had under his jurisdiction the community of Mechit. He was succeeded by Michael ben Meïr Eisenstadt, who in turn was followed, about 1762, by his son Moses Eisenstadt (died 25 October 1795). According to a local legend, the philosopher Salomon Maimon had lived there for several years, and was intimate with Moses Eisenstadt.

Until 1623 the town was a part of the powiat of Brześć; after that date it was transferred, together with the neighbouring towns, to the district of Pinsk. According to tradition, the town originally was located on the opposite bank of the river, on the road leading to Lyakhovichy; but after the destructive fire of 1705 it was rebuilt, at the instance of the governor, on its present site.

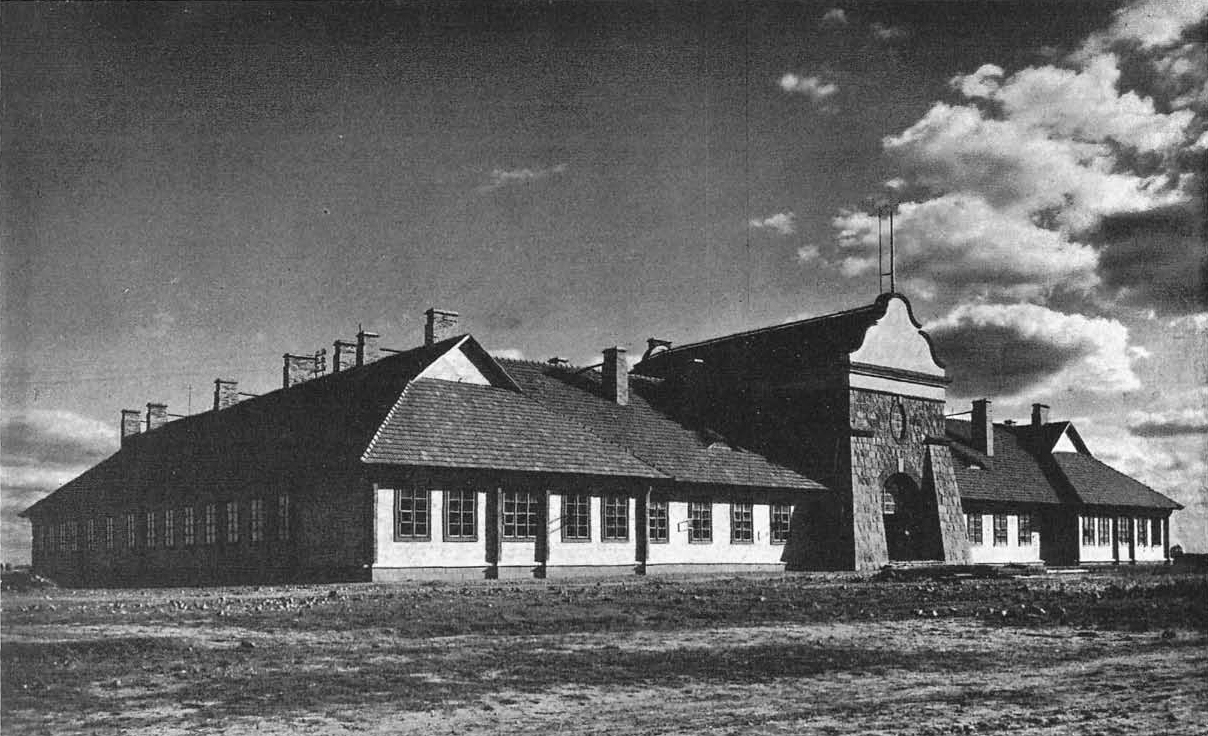
Barracks of the Polish Border Protection Corps in the 1920s

In 1793, Klyetsk was acquired by the Russian Empire as a result of the Second Partition of Poland. The town was repeatedly destroyed by fire in the 19th century, including in 1817, 1845, 1865, and 1886. In 1903 Klyetsk had a total population of about 8,000, of which about 6,000 were Jews.

From 1921 until 1939, Klyetsk (Kleck) was part of the Second Polish Republic. The town was a parish (gmina) centre in Nieśwież county (powiat) of Nowogródek Voivodeship.

=== World War II ===
On 17 September 1939, Klyetsk was occupied by the Red Army and, on 14 November 1939, incorporated into the Byelorussian SSR. Several Poles, including the town mayor Witold Chmielewski, two policemen and a border guard were murdered by the Soviets in the Katyn massacre in 1940.

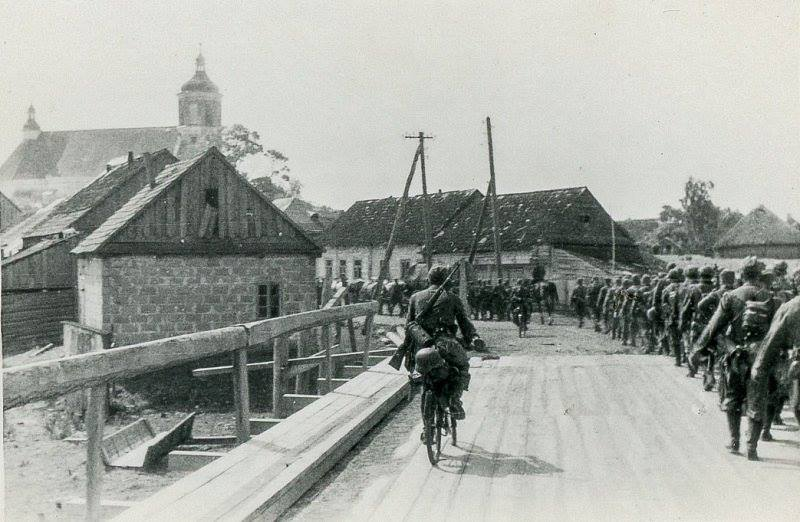
Kleck in 1941

From 26 June 1941 until 4 July 1944, Klyetsk was occupied by Nazi Germany and administered as a part of the Generalbezirk Weißruthenien of Reichskommissariat Ostland. During the German occupation, a large massacre of local Jews took place in the town on 6 October 1941, with about 4,000 people murdered. The remaining Jews of the area (approximately 2,000 people) were massed in a local ghetto and then sent to various extermination camps by 21 August 1942. The Holocaust brought an end to a vibrant Jewish life. Among the monuments of the Jewish past destroyed during World War II were the Jewish cemetery, a large synagogue founded by Prince Radziwiłł in 1796; the Slutsk-Kletsk Yeshiva, a bet ha-midrash built in the early 18th century; and fifteen smaller houses of prayer.

After the recapture of Klyetsk by the Red Army on 4 July 1944, the town resumed its status as a part of the Byelorussian SSR.

=== Recent history ===
Since 1991, it has been a part of the independent Republic of Belarus.

== Coat of arms ==
The coat of arms of the town of Klyetsk in Minsk Region, Belarus, was officially adopted in its current version in 1999.

=== Symbolism ===
The ducal crown symbolizes the special status Klieck had as the centre of the Duchy of Klieck which was in direct ownership of the Grand Dukes of Lithuania in the 14th and 15th century.

The hunting horn symbolizes the Radzivil magnate family which owned Klieck since 1588. The horn is an element of the Radzivils' Traby coat of arms.

== Architecture ==
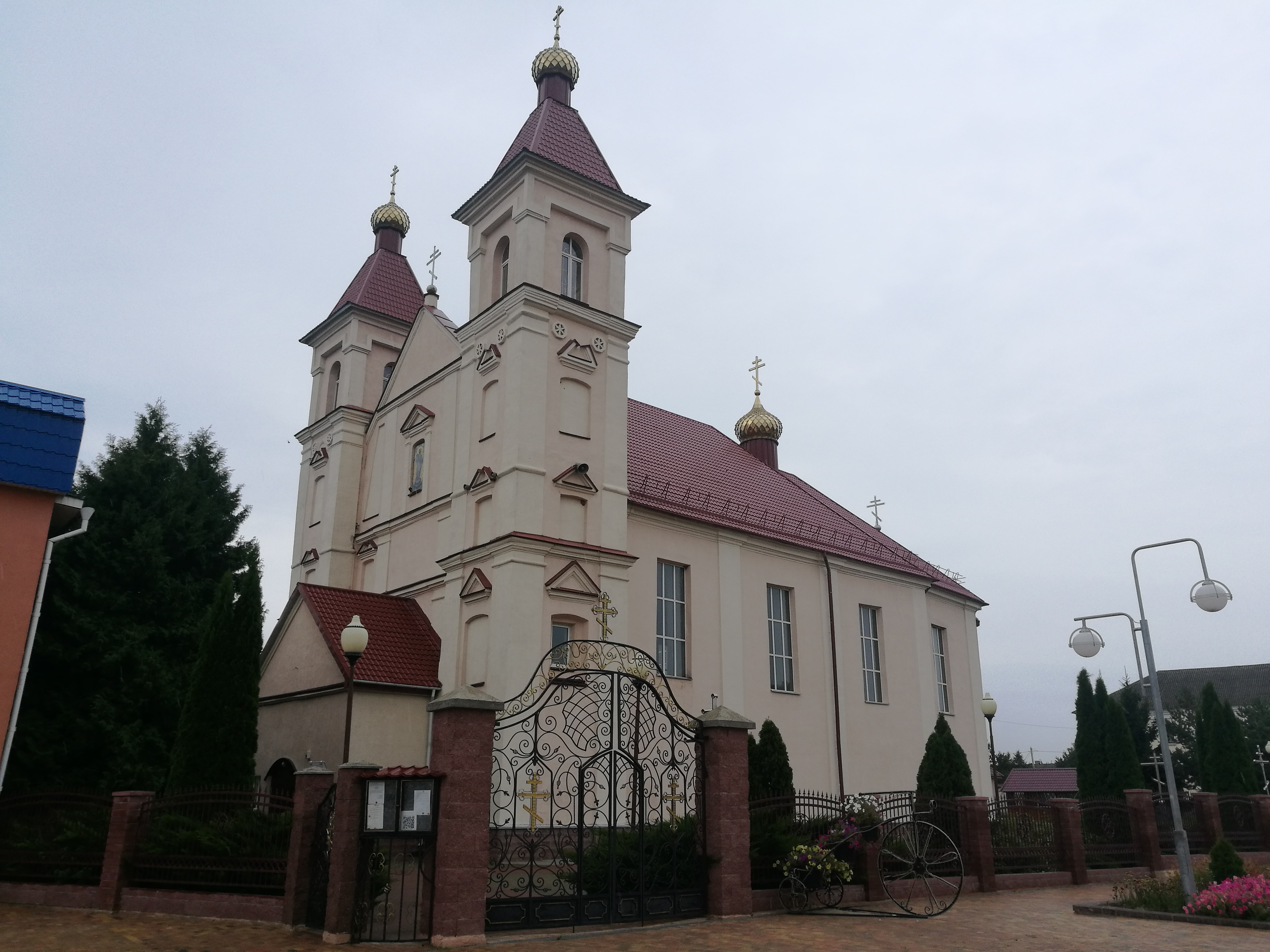
Church of the Resurrection

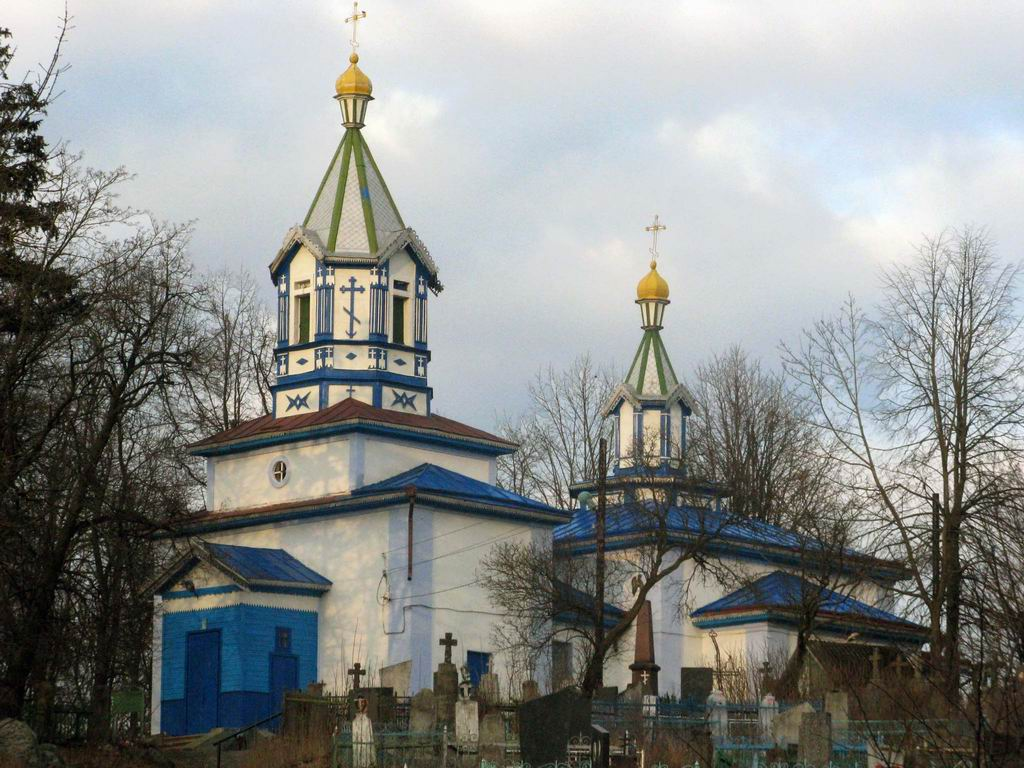
Church of the Intercession

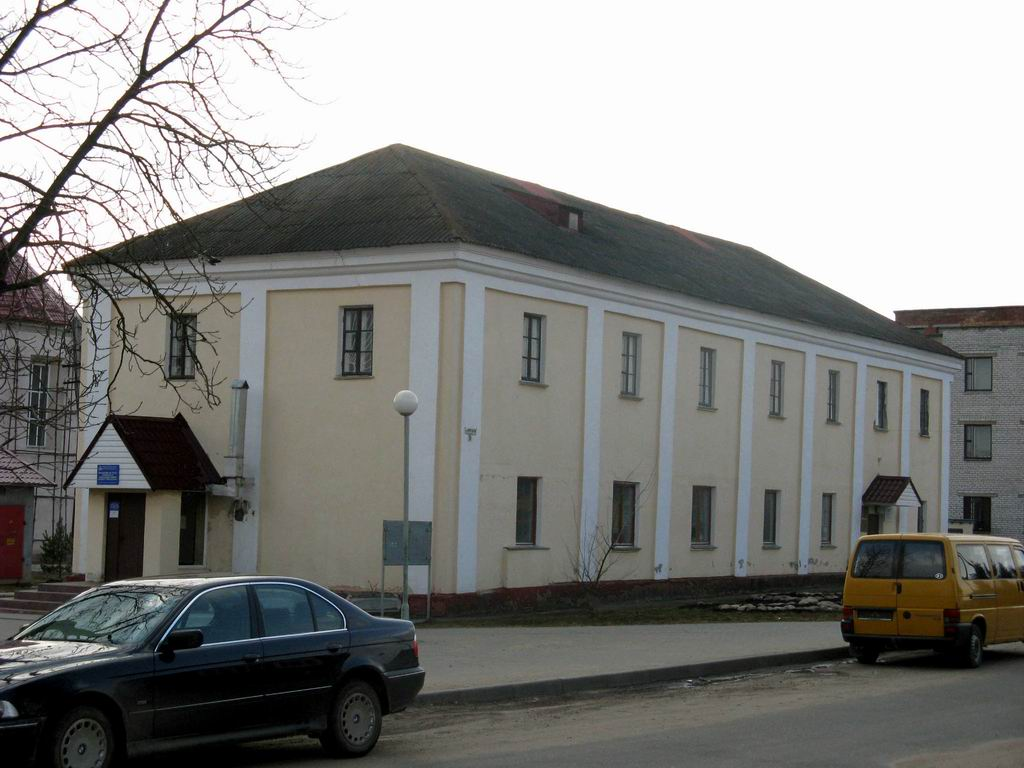
Former Dominican monastery

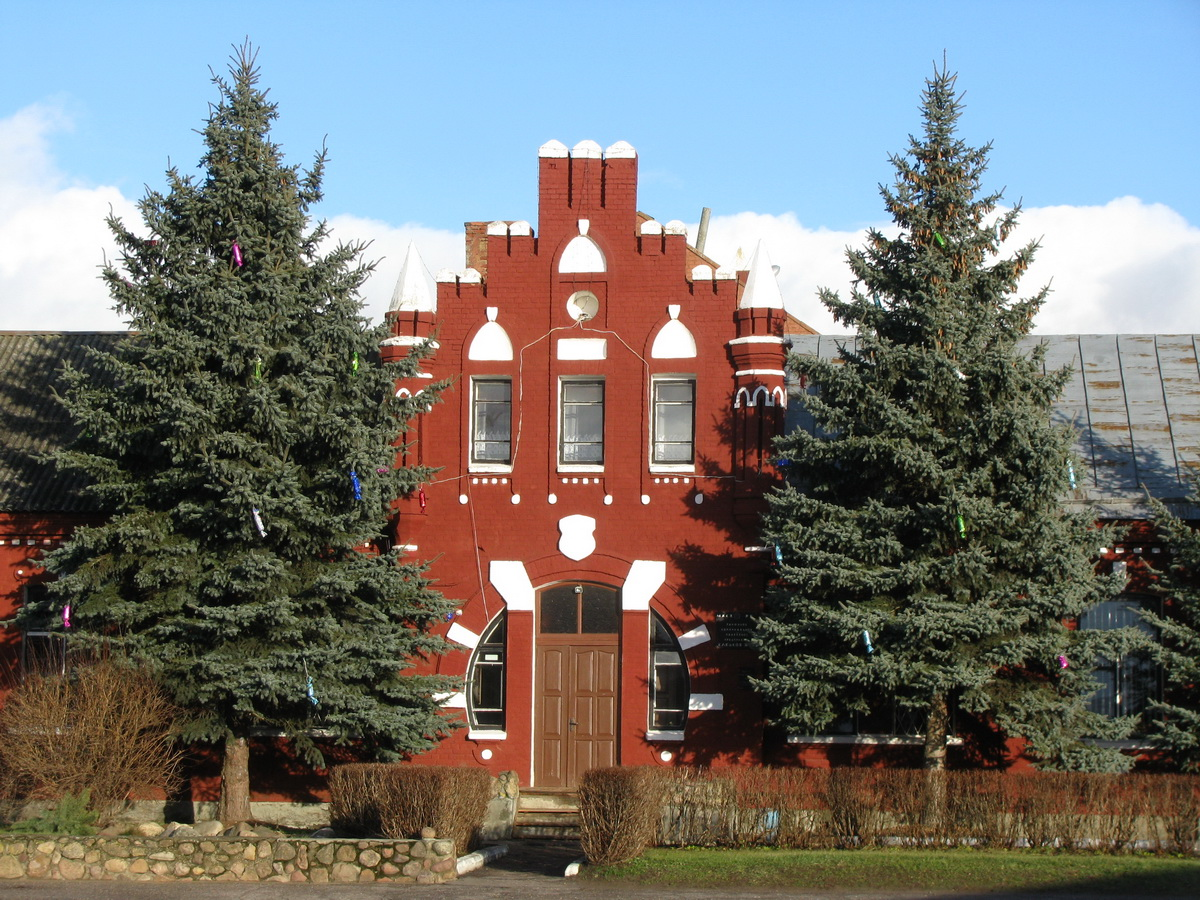
Former hospital

Before the last war, the town's oldest building was the mid-16th-century Trinity cathedral. It was seriously damaged during World War II and eventually blown up by the Soviets in the 1950s. Its ruins are still visible, however. Currently, the town's main architectural landmark is the Church of the Resurrection, which was built in the provincial Baroque style in 1683.

== Culture ==
In Klyetsk, there is the Museum of the History of Kletchina with 10.7 thousand museum items of the main fund. In 2016 it was visited by 12.3 thousand people.

== Notable people ==
- Michał Hieronim Radziwiłł
- Dominik Mikołaj Radziwiłł
- Józef Mikołaj Radziwiłł

== See also ==
- Kletsk Castle

== Sources ==
- (Kletsk in Jewish Encyclopedia) by Herman Rosenthal, J. G. Lipman, Benzion Eisenstadt
