= Battle of Kletsk =

1506 battle of the Muscovite-Lithuanian Wars

Coordinates: 53.018°N 26.703°E

- Part of the Muscovite–Lithuanian Wars and Crimean–Nogai slave raids in Eastern Europe
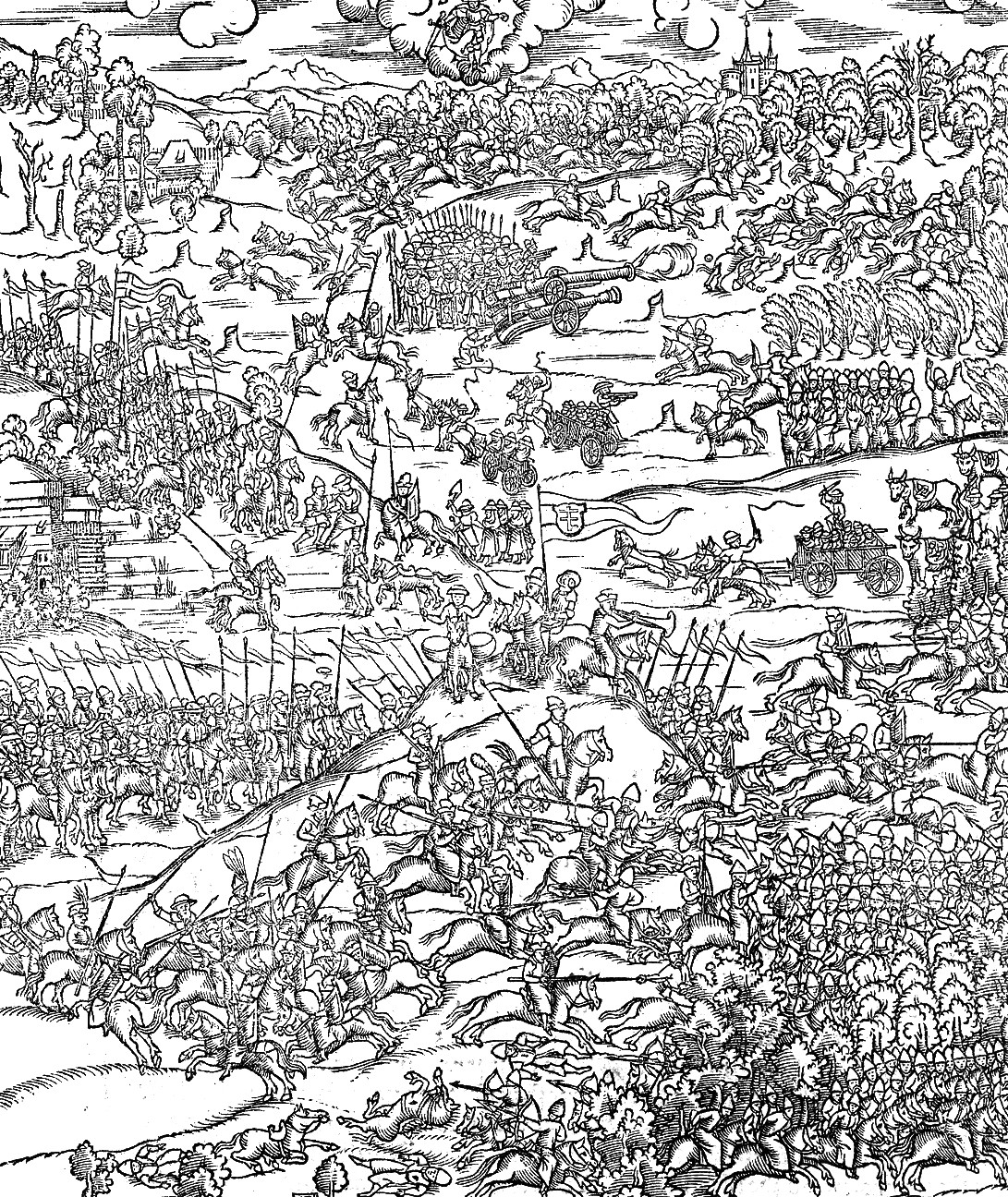
- Lithuanian battle against the Tatars from A Description of Sarmatian Europe (1578) by Alexander Guagnini
Date	5 August 1506
Location	Kletsk
Result	Lithuanian victory

Belligerents
Grand Duchy of Lithuania	Crimean Khanate

Commanders and leaders
Michael Glinski	Feth Giray and Burnaş Giray (sons of Khan Meñli I Giray)

Strength
7,000	20,000

The Battle of Kletsk (Note: Lithuanian: Klecko mūšis, Belarusian: Бітва пад Клецкам.) was fought on 5 August 1506 near Kletsk in present-day Belarus between the Grand Ducal Lithuanian Army under Michael Glinski, Court Marshal of Lithuania, and the army of the Crimean Khanate under Fetih I Giray and Burnaş I Giray, sons of Meñli I Giray, Khan of Crimea. The battle was the most decisive Lithuanian victory over the Tatars in centuries after the Battle of Blue Waters.

== Background ==
The Lithuanians had allied themselves with Hacı I Giray, founder of the Crimean Khanate. However, in the 1480s, his son Meñli I Giray, who came to power with Ottoman help, allied himself with the Grand Principality of Moscow, a long-standing enemy of the Grand Duchy of Lithuania. The Lithuanians then allied with the Golden Horde and its remnant Great Horde, which were the Crimean Khanate's enemies.

During the Lithuanian–Muscovite War of 1500–1503, the Crimean Tatar armies pillaged the Lithuanian southern towns of Slutsk, Kletsk, and Nyasvizh and even threatened the capital city of Vilnius. Alexander Jagiellon, Grand Duke of Lithuania, then ordered the construction of a defensive wall around his capital (completed in 1522).

=== 1505–1506 ===
In August 1505, Meñli I Giray sent his eldest son to plunder the territories of Minsk, Polotsk, Vitebsk, and Novogrudok. It was not only a raid for slaves and loot, but also for political pressure to execute imprisoned Sheikh Ahmed, the last Khan of the Great Horde.

Simultaneously, conflicts emerged within the Lithuanian Council of Lords between the quickly-rising Michael Glinski and Jan Zabrzeziński. In summer 1506, Grand Duke Alexander's health deteriorated and he decided to convene a Seimas in Lida so that he could transfer the Lithuanian throne to his brother Sigismund I. But the convention was disrupted on 25 July by news of a Tatar invasion. According to scout reports, about 20,000 Tatars looted the area around the city of Slutsk and approached Novogrudok and Lida. The raid started at the end of May. At Loyew they crossed the river Dnieper and around July 20–22 established their main camp at Klyetsk – the town was devastated by them in 1503 and posed no serious threat. Alexander left for Vilnius after putting Stanisław Kiszka, Great Hetman of Lithuania, and Glinski in charge of the defense.

== Battle ==
The Tatars set up their camp in a strong defensive position between the Lan River and its tributary Tsapra. Then their sent out half of forces in smaller groups to pillage surrounding areas.

Meanwhile, the Lithuanians quickly assembled 7,000 men force in Novogrudok. On 3 August, the Lithuanians learned the Tatar camp's location and underwent a night march towards Klyetsk, covering a distance of about 80 kilometres (50 mi) in 24 hours – an impressive accomplishment for the day and age. The march exhausted Kiszka, who fell ill; command of the Lithuanian army passed to Glinski. Though Glinski was of Tatar roots, he had fought in the Italian Wars and other conflicts in western Europe.

The Tatars were warned of the approaching Lithuanian army and were ready for battle. Apparently, they decided against trying to outrun the approaching army to protect their slaves and loot. Glinski, on the other hand, wanted to destroy the Tatar army, not merely push it back to Crimea. The heavy Lithuanian cavalry could not cross the rivers and their swampy banks. Therefore, Glinski split his army in half, so that he might attack the Tatars from two sides and block retreat routes, and the following day began building two pontoon bridges across the rivers as the combatants exchanged artillery fire.

However, Glinski's political rival Jan Zabrzeziński did not trust Glinski's command and, against orders, attacked the Tatars as soon as one of the bridges was completed on 5 August. The small detachments of Zabrzeziński's men were quickly defeated, and the Tatars mockingly displayed their severed heads. This enraged the right wing of the Lithuanian army, which promptly attacked in full force. That prompted the Tatars to concentrate their full force against the Lithuanian right wing, leaving only weak defenses against the Lithuanian left wing, which delayed its attack. When Glinski led the left wing forward to the assault, the Lithuanians easily broke through the defenses and attacked the main Tatar forces from the rear. The Tatar army was split in half: one half was surrounded and defeated while the other retreated. The Lithuanians then pursued the retreating part of the Tatars army; it was said that more Tatars died retreating across the Tsapra than in the battle.

After finishing off the remaining nearby enemies, the Lithuanians took the camp where they recovered much of looted booty: gold, silver, horses and people captured for slave markets by the Tatars. For a few more days, until 8 August, the Lithuanians lay in wait for the Tatar contingents who had splintered off before the battle and were now returning from pillaging Lithuanian villages and nearby countryside — and destroyed them as they arrived. Other remnants of Tatar forces were defeated by locals at Slutsk, Zhytomyr, Ovruch.

== Aftermath ==
On 12 August 1506, victorious Michael Glinski entered Vilnius. In honor of the victory, Mikołaj II Radziwiłł sponsored the construction of the Church of St. George on the Neris riverbank. But when Grand Duke Alexander Jagiellon died on 19 August, Zabrzeziński accused Glinski of having conspired to murder the ruler. Glinski fell from royal favor and began an anti-Lithuanian revolt, murdering Zabrzeziński and allying with the Grand Principality of Moscow, rekindling the Muscovite–Lithuanian War.

Khan Meñli I Giray of Crimea hurried to assure Alexander Jagiellon that the raid was unauthorized and asked to maintain peace. The Crimean Khanate severed its long-standing alliance with Moscow due to, among other things, the Muscovite campaign against the Khanate of Kazan. Sigismund I the Old, Grand Duke of Lithuania, ultimately reached an alliance with the Khan, offering a tributary payment and receiving an jarlig for the Russian territories of Novgorod, Pskov, and Ryazan in return. The combination of both these events led to the Tatars shifting the raids to Muscovite-controlled lands since 1507.

== Bibliography ==
- Baranauskas, Tomas (2006-08-07). "Tomas Baranauskas: Ką mums reiškia pergalė prieš totorius?" (in Lithuanian). OMNI naujienos. Archived from the original on 2008-06-04.
- Baronas, Darius (2013). "Klecko mūšis". In Zikaras, Karolis (ed.). Žymiausi Lietuvos mūšiai ir karinės operacijos (2nd ed.). Vilnius: UAB ALIO. pp. 75–79. ISBN 978-9986-827-05-4.
- Batūra, Romas (September 2006). "Klecko mūšiui – 500 metų" (PDF). Kariūnas (in Lithuanian). 3 (90): 22–24.
- Kolodziejczyk, Dariusz (2011). The Crimean Khanate and Poland-Lithuania: International Diplomacy on the European Periphery (15th–18th Century). A Study of Peace Treaties Followed by Annotated Documents. The Ottoman Empire and its Heritage. Brill. pp. 30–31. ISBN 9789004191907.
- Kulikauskas, Gediminas (2008-10-30). "Garsiausias Lietuvos Didžiosios Kunigaikštystės maištininkas" (in Lithuanian). Verslo žinios. Archived from the original on 2011-07-22.
- Smith Williams, Henry (1907). The Historians' History of the World: A Comprehensive Narrative of the Rise and Development of Nations as Recorded by Over Two Thousand of the Great Writers of All Ages. Vol. 17. Hooper & Jackson, Ltd. p. 185. OCLC 22998871.
