= Sinyawka, Klyetsk district rural council =

Sinyawka, Klyetsk district rural council

Sinyawka rural council is a lower-level subdivision (selsoviet) of Klyetsk district, Minsk region, Belarus.
