= Shchepichy rural council =

Shchepichy rural council is a lower-level subdivision (selsoviet) of Klyetsk district, Minsk region, Belarus.
