= Halynka, Klyetsk district rural council =

Halynka rural council is a lower-level subdivision (selsoviet) of Klyetsk district, Minsk region, Belarus.
