= Krasnaya Zvyazda rural council =

Krasnaya Zvyazda rural council is a lower-level subdivision (selsoviet) of Klyetsk district, Minsk region, Belarus.
