= Morach rural council =

Morach rural council is a lower-level subdivision (selsoviet) of Klyetsk district, Minsk region, Belarus.
