= Kukhchytsy rural council =

Kukhchytsy rural council is a lower-level subdivision (selsoviet) of Klyetsk district, Minsk region, Belarus.
