= Glinski rebellion =

Failed rebellion

- Part of Muscovite–Lithuanian Wars
| Date | February–September 1508 |
| Location | Grand Duchy of Lithuania |
| Result | Rebellion suppressed |

Belligerents
| Glinskis and their supporters | Grand Duchy of Lithuania |

Commanders and leaders
| Mikhail Glinski | Konstanty Ostrogski |

Strength
| About 2,000 horsemen | 15,000–16,000 |

The Glinski rebellion was a revolt in 1508 in the Grand Duchy of Lithuania by a group of aristocrats led by Prince Mikhail Glinski in 1508. It grew out of a rivalry between two factions of the nobility during the final years of Grand Duke Alexander Jagiellon. The revolt began when Sigismund I, the new Grand Duke, decided to strip Glinski of his posts based on rumors spread by Jan Zabrzeziński, Glinski's enemy. After failing to settle the dispute at the royal court, Glinski and his supporters (mostly relatives) rose up in arms. The rebels swore allegiance to Vasili III of Russia, who was waging war against Lithuania.

The rebels and their Russian supporters failed to achieve military victory. They were allowed to go into exile in Moscow and take their movable property, but their vast land possessions were confiscated.

== Origin and progress ==
=== Historical background ===
In the early 16th century, the Grand Duchy of Lithuania lost about one-third of its territory as a result of the second war with Muscovy from 1500 to 1503.

In addition, there were internal disagreements over a new union with the Kingdom of Poland (1501). To take effect, the Union of Mielnik needed to be ratified by the Lithuanian Seimas. Opponents of the union, among them Mikhail Glinski and the Grand Duke Alexander, refused to approve the union during the 1505 Seimas in Brest. Supporters of the union wanted to expand their political rights; the union greatly limited the power of the monarchy and in Poland led to the elective monarchy.

In February 1507, the Seimas in Vilnius decided to demand the return of the territory it had lost in the previous war with Muscovy, and dispatched an ambassador to Moscow with an ultimatum. The ambassador's failure was regarded as casus belli. Moscow acted first but, despite a delay in mustering the Lithuanian troops, did not achieve any significant results. Military actions in the first phase of the war (prior to the entry of the rebels into the conflict) were rather passive and did not bring about a desired result for either of the parties.

=== Causes ===
During the last years of Grand Duke Alexander's reign, Mikhail Glinski wielded considerable influence at court, and held the important post of Court Marshal from 1500 to 1506. The rapid growth of Glinski's influence troubled the old Lithuanian aristocracy, such as the Radziwiłł family, the Kęsgailos, and especially Jan Zabrzeziński, who became Glinski's personal enemy. As a trustee of the Grand Duke, Glinski facilitated the rise of his relatives and of others, which strengthened his position.

The ambassador of the German emperor, Sigismund von Herberstein, set out the essence of the rebellion in his Notes on Muscovite Affairs. The cause of the quarrel between Glinski and Zabrzeziński, he thought, was that Trakai voivode Zabrzeziński had ordered to beat Glinski's servant because the servant was sent for a second time to get oats for the royal horses in Trakai. Glinski, who had great influence on the Grand Duke, contrived to have Zabrzeziński deprived of two posts including the Voivodeship, even though such posts, once awarded, were rarely taken away. Herberstein reports that although they subsequently reconciled, and Zabrzeziński retained a third post, Zabrzeziński still held a grudge against Glinski.

According to 16th century Polish historian Maciej Stryjkowski and Bychowiec Chronicle, the conflict between Glinski and Zabrzeziński began after Glinski achieved the dismissal of Lida vicegerent Yuri Ilyinich and the appointment of Andrei Drozhdzh, Glinski's cousin, in his place. Yuri Ilyinich complained to the Council of Lords that his rights had been violated. The Council, including Zabrzeziński, who was a member, supported Ilyinich and declined to confirm the appointment, calling Drozhdzh a "commoner". They also drew attention to the enthronement privilege of Alexander, which said that only the deprivation of the coat of arms warranted dismissal. Alexander, angered by the disobedience, urged lords to the Brest Seimas, where he ordered them to imprison Ilyinich and demanded lords "not appear in his eyes". Despite the chronicles' description and chronology, historians note that Zabrzeziński fell out of favor due to the fact he was an active supporter of the ratification of the Union of Mielnik, which was thwarted in the Brest Seimas. Krzysztof Pietkiewicz states that in 1503 Glinski had already accused Zabrzeziński of plotting an assassination.

On August 6, 1506, Glinski triumphed over the army of the Crimean Khan near Kletsk. On August 19, Grand Duke Alexander died. In the elections Glinski supported Sigismund, Alexander's younger brother. However, under the influence of rumors spread by Zabrzeziński, Sigismund deprived Glinski and his brothers Ivan and Vasily of their posts. According to Herberstein, who called Glinski and Konstanty Ostrogski two especially famous people of the Grand Duchy,

After the king's death, the hatred which had been buried in the mind of Ivan [Jan], on account of having been deprived of his palatinate through his antagonist's influence, again awoke. The consequence was, that the latter, with his accomplices and friends, was charged with treason to King Sigismund, who had succeeded Alexander, was slandered by certain of his rivals, and declared to be a traitor to his country. The Knes Michael [Prince Mikhail], smarting under such an injury, often appealed to the king, and demanded that the cause should be equitably judged between himself and Saversinski [Zabrzeziński], declaring that he would then be able to clear himself from so heavy a charge; but finding that the king would not listen to his petition, he went over to Hungary to Vladislav, the king's brother. Thence he sent both letters and messengers to the king, imploring him to recognize his plea; but when he found that all his efforts were of no avail…

— Sigismund von Herberstein. Notes upon Russia / English translation by R. H. Major. — London, 1852. — Vol. 2. — P. 106.

Glinski appealed for assistance to the Czech and Hungarian king Vladislav II and to the Crimean khan Mengli Giray. Vladislav II sent to the Grand Duke Sigismund ambassadors asking for Glinski's "complete satisfaction". Mengli Giray sent Sigismund a message demanding the restoration of Glinski as the Court Marshal and, in the case of non-fulfilment, threatened to break the "brotherhood" (military alliance).

In 1507 the Polish Chancellor Jan Laski warned Glinski that he would never be safe because of the threat from the Lithuanian nobility. At the same time, Vice-Chancellor Maciej Drzewicki argued that Laski intentionally incited Glinski to revolt. But, according to the American historian Stephen Christopher Rowell, Drzewicki always considered Laski as the cause of all unrest under Sigismund's reign, believing him to be a kind of "evil genius". According to Herberstein, Glinski "incensed at the indignity offered to him, he told the king that he should resent such infamous conduct, and that he himself would one day live to repent it".

=== Beginning ===
Glinski began to spread rumors that authorities intended to proselytize all Orthodox Christians to Catholicism and that those who refused to convert would be executed, even though he himself was a Catholic. As proof he relied on the statement of Fyodor Kolontaev, who allegedly had received information from the Ivan Sapieha. Later, under oath, Kolontaev denied that he said anything like this to Glinski. According to Russian historian Mikhail Krom, Prince Glinski wasn't sincere in his statements. Thus in 1509, while remaining a Catholic, Glinski reported in a letter to Emperor Maximilian that he preferred not to declare his true faith until achieving the return of his former position and therefore he asked the emperor, the Roman Church, and every Catholic for forgiveness.

Taking advantage of Sigismund's departure to the Sejm in Kraków, Glinski gathered his "brothers and friends" and told them about his intentions. From his spies he knew that his enemy Jan Zabrzeziński was in his manor near Grodno. On February 2, 1508, Glinski and a cohort of 700 riders crossed the Neman River and surrounded the manor. Then Glinski's friend German Shlyaynits broke with the people into the manor. Zabrzeziński was caught getting out of his bed and beheaded on the orders of Glinski by an unnamed Muslim. It was the beginning of the rebellion.

Having dealt with his main enemy, Glinski, who according to Polish historian Maciej Stryjkowski had 2,000 soldiers, sent units throughout Lithuania and made an attempt to take the Kaunas Castle. On February 21, Grand Duke Sigismund sent a letter to the Crimean khan with an eye to embroiling Glinski with him. Mengli Giray's greatest enemy Great Horde Khan Sheikh Ahmed was imprisoned in the Kaunas Castle and Sigismund alleged that Glinski intended to release him. After failing to take Kaunas Castle, Glinski moved his forces to Navahrudak and then to Vilnius. But, after learning that the city was already prepared for defense, he moved back to his main estate — Turov.

In Turov, Glinski negotiated with Grand Duke Sigismund, who at that time was in Kraków, and with the Council of Lords in Vilnius. Sigismund sent to Turov his man Jan Kostevich. Kostevich handed to Glinski the grand duke's promise to resolve his conflict with the Lords. But the Glinski family didn't trust the grand duke's envoy, insisting that one of the most influential Lithuanian nobles, Albertas Goštautas, was sent in his place and stating that they would wait for his arrival until March 12.

It is not entirely clear when the Glinski family began negotiations with Moscow. According to Herberstein, Wapowski, Stryjkovsky, and the Lithuanian and Samogitian Chronicle, an initiative to start negotiations with Moscow came from the Glinski family, who even before the murder of Zabrzeziński sent a messenger with a letter to the Grand Duke. Justus Ludwik Decjusz Chronicle dates this to the time after the murder. This version is supported by the fact that Glinski's negotiations with Moscow are not mentioned in Sigismund's letter to Mengli Giray dated February 21, 1508. In a letter to Vasily III, Mikhail Glinski wrote that he would take the oath to Moscow if Vasily issued a charter granting protection for his estates and property. Glinski agreed to serve with all the fortresses that he already owned and those he would be able to take by force or persuasion. Vasily III, who'd heard a lot about the abilities of the Prince, accepted the offer and sent a "made up the best way possible" agreement charter to Glinski. Russian historian Mikhail Krom, taking into account the discrepancy between sources, dates the arrival of Mikhail's envoy to Moscow to March 1508.

Russian Vremennik, a highly detailed source on the progress of the rebellion, with a protograph created in the middle of the 16th century, contains a different version of the events. The unknown author points to the fact that negotiations were initiated not by Mikhail, but by Vasily III himself. This source reports about the Moscow envoy Mitya Gouba Moklokov's arrival to the Glinski family with a charter of invitation to the service of Vasily III with their ancestral lands. The Glinski brothers didn't wait for a response from Grand Duke Sigismund and sent their man Ivan Priezhzhy to Moscow with charters asking to take them into Moscow service and to defend them and their estates.

=== On the Moscow service ===
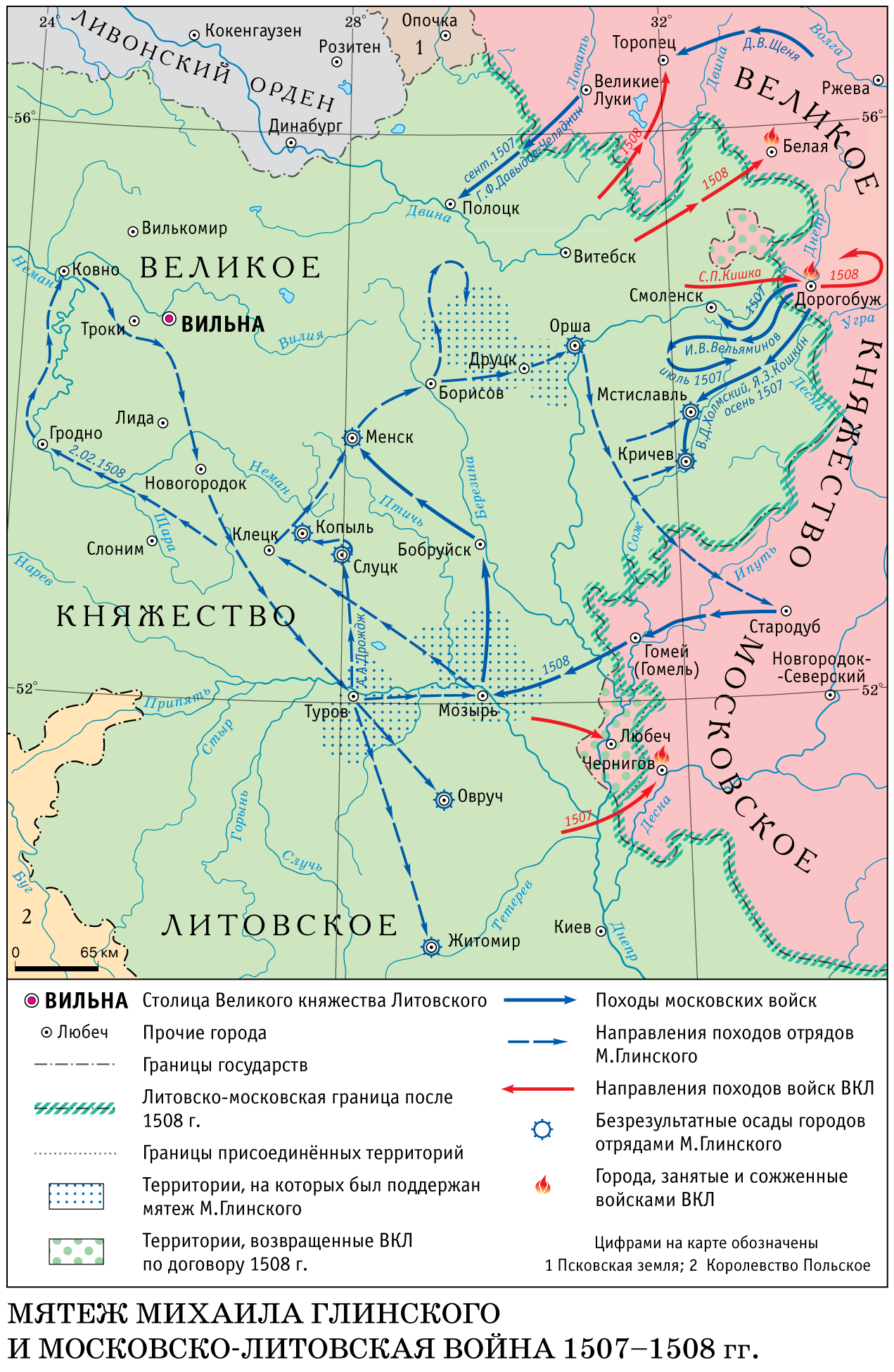
Historical map by Viktor Temushev

After sending the envoy, Glinski moved to Mazyr, where his cousin Jakub Ivashintsov served as vicegerent. Probably for this reason the city was surrendered by Ivashintsov without any resistance. According to Bernard Wapowski, in Mazyr Mikhail Glinski was solemnly greeted by the Orthodox clergy.

At this time, the Crimean ambassador Hozyash Mirza came to the Glinski family with a proposal to move under the Mengli Giray service. Crimean ambassador promised to the princes Kiev with its surrounding lands. Glinski rejected this offer, probably due to the fact that Moklokov had already brought a response from Vasily III. The Grand Prince of Moscow took the Glinski family into his service and promised to give them all the cities that would be taken in Lithuania. He notified about the sending aid with voivodes Vasily Shemyachich, Ivan Odoevsky, Andrey and Semyon Trubetskoy, Ivan Repnya-Obolensky, Ivan Vorotynsky, Andrey Saburov, Alexander Olenka, and "many other of his commanders with many people". Glinskis and their supporters, most of whom were their relatives or served them, took the oath (kissed the cross) to Vasily III in front of Moklokov. Glinski's defection turned the nature of the rebellion from an internal Lithuanian affair to an episode of the Lithuanian-Russian War. This was probably a good conjuncture for Vasily III who wanted to change the course of the war that was not going too well for him.

Information about the course of the rebellion after Mazyr was taken is contradictory. According to Mikhail Krom, there is a huge discrepancy between the information from early and later sources. He regards as faithful the descriptions of events of spring — summer 1508 from the chronicles of Decius and Wapowski, from the Russian Vremennik and from Sigismund's and Mikhail's letters. According to these sources, the rebel units had not taken any cities except Mazyr. While in the later sources: Stryjkowski, Bielskys, and Lithuanian chronicles — Glinski was credited with taking Turov, Orsha, Krychaw, and Gomel, although it is known that Turov was originally in his possession and Gomel had belonged to Moscow since 1500.

According to Stryjkowski, while Mikhail tried to capture Kletsk and Gomel, his brother Vasily operated in the Kiev region. Vasily allegedly unsuccessfully besieged Zhytomyr and Ovruch and urged the local Orthodox nobility to join the rebellion, promising that when Mikhail becomes the Grand Duke, he would revive the "Kiev monarchy". From other sources we know only that the rebel units were in the Kiev region. The evidence is Lev Tishkevich's appeal to the Grand Duke, issued on June 7, 1508. Tishkevich complained that Glinski had ravaged his estate near Kiev.

In June 1508, the Muscovite troops began to come from different directions. On June 11, Mikhail Glinski moved from Kletsk to Minsk, where Dmitry Zhizhemsky's detachment had been sent previously. At the same time, Vasily Shemyachich's troops came to Minsk from Babruysk. The joint siege of Minsk began, lasting for two weeks and ending in failure, despite Mikhail writing in his letter to Vasily III that the city garrison was "only thirty soldiers and there were… very few people in the city". After the failure of the siege, Glinski moved to Barysaw, where he operated until the arrival of Lithuanian troops.

Mikhail Glinski's units operated over large areas. They reached Vilnius and Novogrudok, where they joined the Muscovite troops of voivodes Andrei Trubetskoy and Andrei Lukomsky. Meanwhile, Lithuanian troops did not resist the rebels, there were only rumors that "the Lords had been in Lida and moved to Novogrudok and the King [Sigismund I] had allegedly… moved from Poland to Brest".

On June 12, Prince Angrey Drozhdzh with troops was sent to Slutsk. After the failed attempt to capture Slutsk, Drozhdzh moved to Kapyl and besieged the town, but this siege was also unsuccessful. According to Stryjkowski, although this is contrary to Glisnki's letter to Vasily III, Slutsk was besieged by Glisnki himself. Stryjkowski noted the legend that, being unmarried, Glinski intended to force the widow Princess Anastasia of Slutsk to marry him. This would give him an opportunity to claim the "Kiev monarchy" throne as Slutsk princes descended from Kievan prince Olelko Vladimirovich.

One of the few rebel successes was the besieged Princes of Drutsk joining the rebellion. From Drutsk, Shemyatich's and Glinski's forces, as well as Shchenya's troops, retreated to Orsha. They fired upon the city with cannons, but failed to inflict any damage. In mid-July, Lithuanian forces, consisting of 15-16 thousand soldiers under the leadership of Konstanty Ostrogski, came to Orsha. The two armies faced each other from 13 to 22 July, but did not dare to start the battle. After abandoning the siege of Orsha, Moscow troops moved to Mstsislaw, ravaged the area and then retreated to Vyazma. Glinski and his supporters retreated to Starodub, which belonged to the Grand Prince of Moscow.

== Fading and outcomes ==
From Starodub, Glinskis moved to Pochep, where Mikhail left his supporters and treasury with princes Dmitry Zhizhemsky, Ivan Ozeretsky, and Andrei Lukomsky, and went to the Grand Prince in Moscow, hoping to receive military support. Grand Prince Vasily III bestowed upon Glinski Maloyaroslavets, Medyn, and villages near Moscow and made other gifts. Then Vasily III let him go back to his own estates in the Grand Duchy of Lithuania and sent voivode Vasily Nesvitsky "with the people along with many pischalniks" in support.

On returning to Mazyr, Mikhail wanted to continue the struggle, but, on October 8, Russian-Lithuanian peace negotiations led to the signing of "perpetual peace". The peace called for a return to status quo ante bellum and the Lithuanian recognition of Moscow's gains of the previous wars. Glinskis and their supporters were given the right to go to Moscow with all their movable property. The vast land possessions of the rebels in the Grand Duchy of Lithuania were subject to confiscation, although Sigismund I had already begun to distribute them to his supporters back in April 1508. Glinski's main estate — Turov — was granted to Prince Konstanty Ostrogski. At the end of 1508, Mikhail Glinski moved to Moscow, where he received Maloyaroslavets as a fiefdom and Borovsk in kormlenie ("feeding"). Medyn was granted to Ivan Glinski.

According to historian Mikhail Crom, the route followed by the rebellion shows that Glinski had no plan for the war and rushed from one shady enterprise to another. Minsk events show that Glinski had no significant military force. Glinski's main goal — reclaiming the high position he had held in the Grand Duchy of Lithuania — was not achieved.

== Rebels ==
The real size of the rebel forces is unknown. Stryjkowski noted that at the beginning of the rebellion Glinskis had 2000 soldiers. According to the Lithuanian and Samogitian Chronicle, they had 3000 horsemen.

Historical sources contain information about 52 rebels and at least 26 of them belonged to the Glinski family, were their relatives, retainers or clients. 11 princes are mentioned in the Russian Vremennik among those who went with Mikhail to Moscow. 5 of them were from the Glinski family: three brothers Ivan, Vasily and Mikhail himself (sons of Lev Glinski) as well as Dmitry and Ivan Glinski. Two of these 11 were Dmitry and Vasily Zhizhemsky (Glinski's relatives). The remaining four princes were Ivan Kozlovsky (according to the source, he served the Glinskis), Vasily Muncha, Ivan Ozeretsky and Andrei Drutsky. The rest of the rebels mentioned in the Russian Vremennik were untitled — Mikhail's cousins Andrey Drozhdzh, Pyotr Drozhdzh and Jakub Ivashintsov, Semyon Aleksandrov with children Mikhail and Boris, Mikhail Gagin, deacon Nikolsky, brothers Pyotr and Fyodor Furs, Ivan Matov, Svyatosha, Demenya, Izmaylo Turov, Voin Yatskovich and 3 of Mikhail's retainers from the Krizhin family. According to Aleksandr Zimin, in Moscow, most of them formed a social clique known as "Litva dvorovaya" (Court Lithuania).

== Evaluation ==
The evaluation of the Glinski Rebellion is controversial. In the late 19th and early 20th centuries, there were discrepancies in the different approaches to understanding the rebellion, as well as in the individual facts of the accounts. Historians Volodymyr Antonovych, Matvey Liubavsky, Mykhailo Hrushevsky and Mitrofan Dovnar-Zapol'skiy while noting the rebellion's narrowness, described it as a struggle between those of "Russian" and "Lithuanian origins" in the Grand Duchy of Lithuania and as an Orthodox Christian struggle against Catholic proselytism. Athanasy Yarushevichru, on the other hand, called the rebellion "the great disorder of the masses" and an "all-Russian affair", but this evaluation was strongly disputed by Liubavsky.

Meanwhile, Polish historians Ludwik Finkel, Oskar Halecki, Ludwik Kolankowski, and the Russian historian Alexander Presnyakov denied that the rebellion had ethnic and religious aspects and considered Mikhail Glinski a shady dealer, supported only by his dependents.

In Soviet historiography, the concept put forward by historian Anatoly Kuznetsov has prevailed. This concept follows the interpretation proposed by Yarushevich — that the Glinski rebellion is considered a "revolt of the masses", aimed at the Russian people's liberation from the authority of Catholic Lithuania. Prominent Soviet historian Alexander Zimin, while an adherent of this approach, added some significant adjustments. Zimin believed that people sympathized with the idea of the rebellion, but "the princes did not want to use the popular movement of Belarusians and Ukrainians for reunification with Russia", leading to the failure of the uprising. Another influential Soviet historian, Boris Florya, noted that the population not only didn't support the rebellion, but it didn't support even the overall unifying policy of the Russian state in the 16th century. He believed the rebellion was caused by feudal lords who pursued their own interests and generally took "the anti-national position".

The situation changed after the Soviet Union collapsed. In 1992, Russian historian Mikhail Krom published his paper in which he completely rejected the Yarushevich-Kuznetsov concept. Krom considered the Rebellion a shady enterprise, caused by the desire of Mikhail and his brothers to regain their lost position. He concluded that the majority of Orthodox princes were satisfied with the situation in the Grand Duchy of Lithuania and they did not strive to separate. Mikhail Krom noted that in the early sources there are no ethnic or religious connotations for the events. These connotations appear only in the writings of the late 1560s-1590s, when ethnic and interconfessional differences in the Grand Duchy of Lithuania sharply worsened and the past was reinterpreted in the form of Orthodoxy-Catholicism confrontation.

Ethnic or religious reasons for the rebellion are also rejected by the American historian Stephen Christopher Rowell, who pointed out that Glinski supporters were limited to his relatives and clients, and the rebellion itself was a gamble in the sense that no plan existed and the actions had different purposes. Stephen Rowell believed that Glinski not opposed to the monarch, whose vassal he considered himself to be at the beginning of the rebellion, but to Zabrzeziński and his supporters directly.

Polish historian Jan Tęgowski saw causes of the rebellion in the absence of family ties between the Glinski family and the state elites represented by Radziwiłł, Zabrzeziński, Kiszka and Kęsgaila. This caused disagreement between Mikhail and Jan Zabrzeziński, and between Mikhail and the Council of Lords as a whole.

According to Belarusian historian Makar Shnip, in the early 16th century political groupings made up on an ethnoreligious basis did not exist in the Grand Duchy of Lithuania. The cause of the Glinski uprising was the confrontation between Mikhail and Jan Zabrzeziński on different economic and political issues, as well as the reluctance of the Grand Duke Sigismund to resolve the case in court and his decision to strip Mikhail and his brothers of their posts. Belarusian historians consider the rebellion itself to have been spontaneous, aimed at achieving Glinski's personal goals, with no specific sociopolitical ideas.
