= Hrytsevichy rural council =

Hrytsevichy rural council is a lower-level subdivision (selsoviet) of Klyetsk district, Minsk region, Belarus.

== Rural localities ==
The populations are from the 2009 Belarusian census and 2019 Belarusian census

Russian name	Belarusian name	Pop. 2009	Pop. 2019
Грицевичский сельсовет	Грыцэвіцкі сельсавет	1714	1236
д Воронино	в Вароніна	72	46
аг Грицевичи	аг Грыцэвічы	534	504
д Драбовщина	в Драбаўшчына	299	205
д Заельня	в Заельня	183	100
д Мервины	в Мервіны	228	153
аг Орешница	аг Арэшніца	236	151
д Светлая	в Светлая	29	11
д Тесновка	в Цясноўка	66	33
д Чаша	в Чаша	67	33
