= Zaastravyechcha rural council =

Subdivision of Klyetsk district, Belarus

Zaastravyechcha rural council is a lower-level subdivision (selsoviet) of Klyetsk district, Minsk region, Belarus.
