= Kletsk Castle =

Former castle in Kletsk, Belarus

Coordinates: 53°04′10″N 26°37′38″E

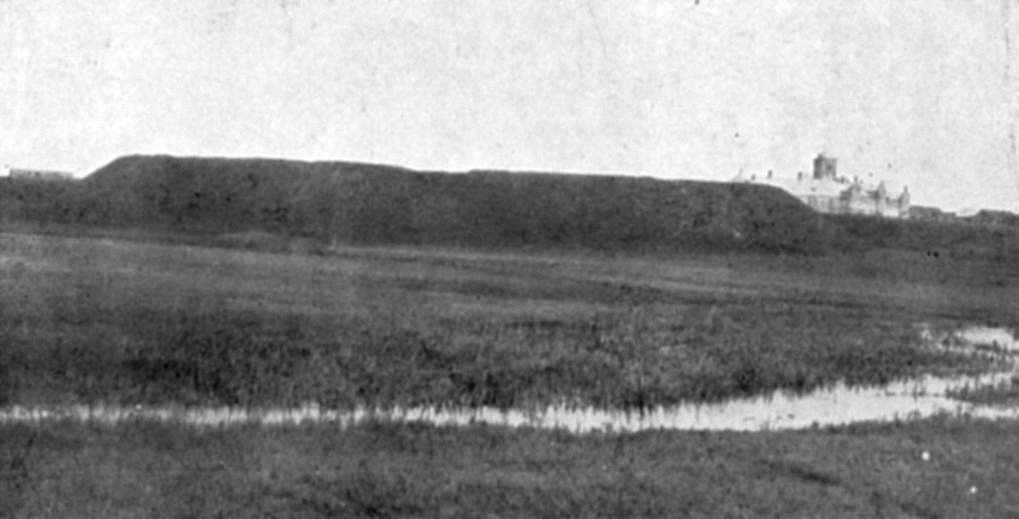
Site of ancient castle, 1920s

Kletsk Castle was a castle in Belarus. It was completely destroyed by the Swedes in 1706.
