= Damkhat Reachea =

Damkhat Reachea (died 1508) was a Cambodian king and emperor, Thomuro Reachea uncle's successor, which is known relatively few on his life. In the year 1508, he was murdered by an adventurer named Kan, who usurped his throne.
