= Church of St. George, Vilnius =

Roman Catholic church in Vilnius, Lithuania built in 1765

Church of St. George Šv. Jurgio bažnyčia
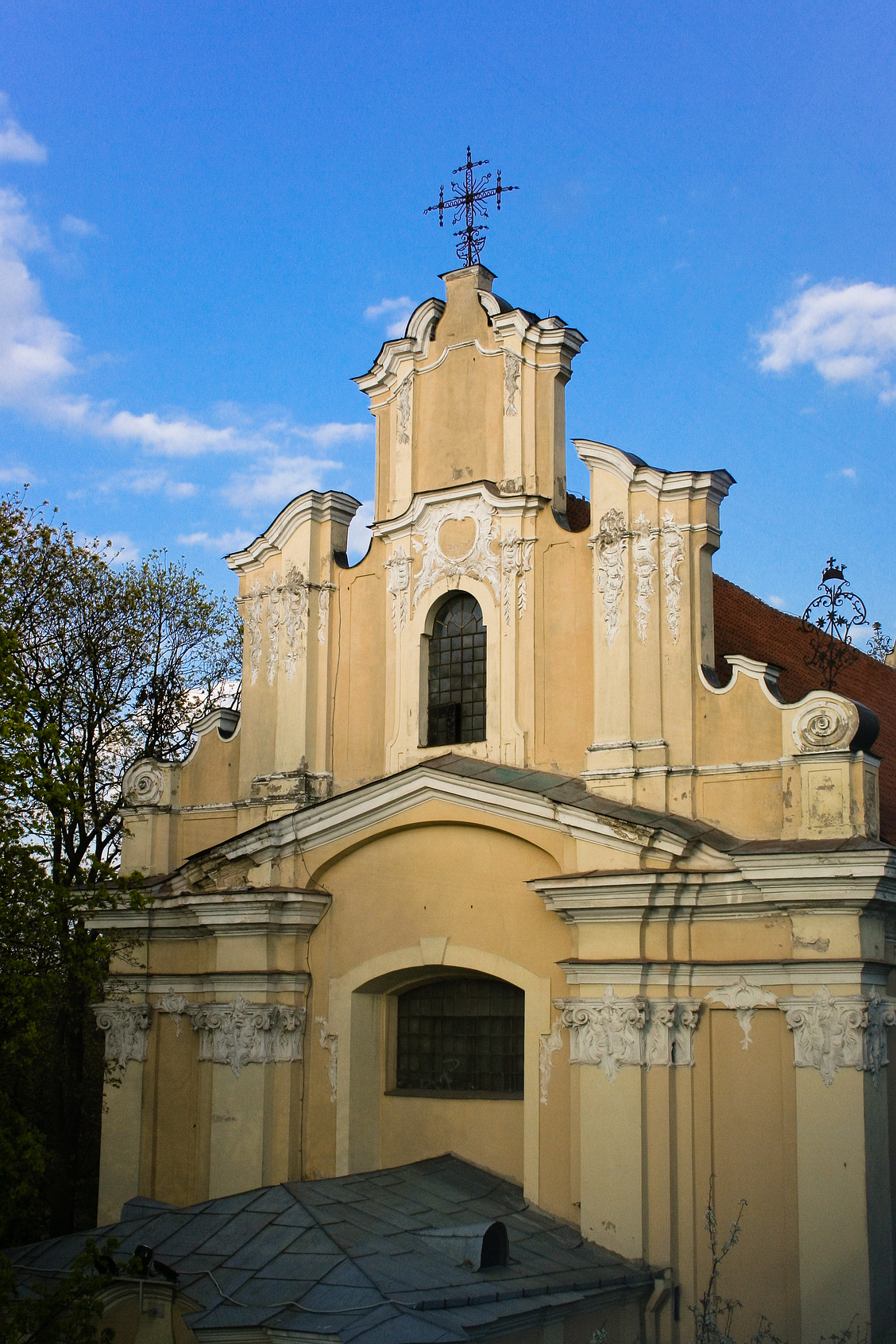
- Façade of the church in 2007

Religion
- Affiliation: Roman Catholic
- Diocese: Vilnius Old Town
- Leadership: Roman Catholic Archdiocese of Vilnius
- Year consecrated: 1765

Location
- Location: Vilnius, Lithuania
- Interactive map of Church of St. George; Šv. Jurgio bažnyčia
- Coordinates: 54°41′15.52″N 25°16′56.89″E

Architecture
- Type: Church
- Style: Baroque
- Completed: 1765
- Materials: Plastered masonry

Church of St. George (Lithuanian: Šv. Jurgio bažnyčia) is a Roman Catholic church in the Vilnius Old Town which was completed and consecrated in 1765. The church and nearby monastery complex was built by the Radziwiłł family and served as family's mausoleum. The church has an 18th-century organ.

== Gallery ==
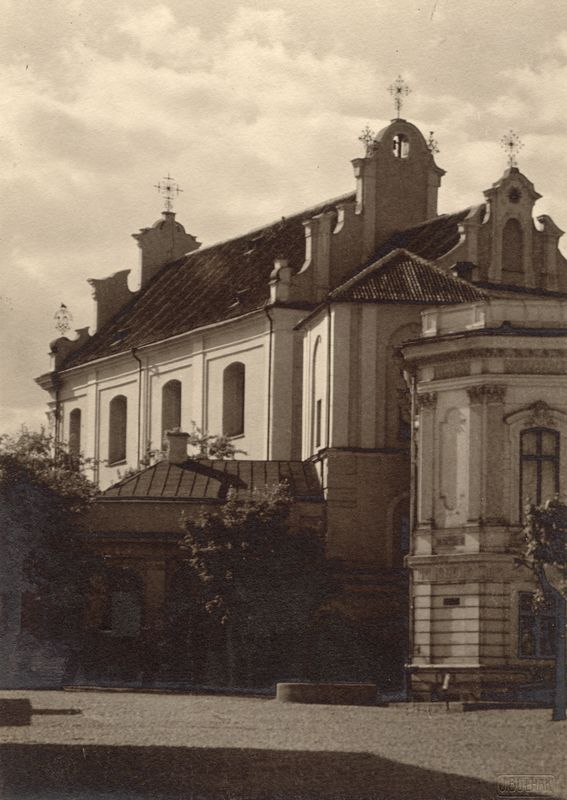
Photo of the church in 1913

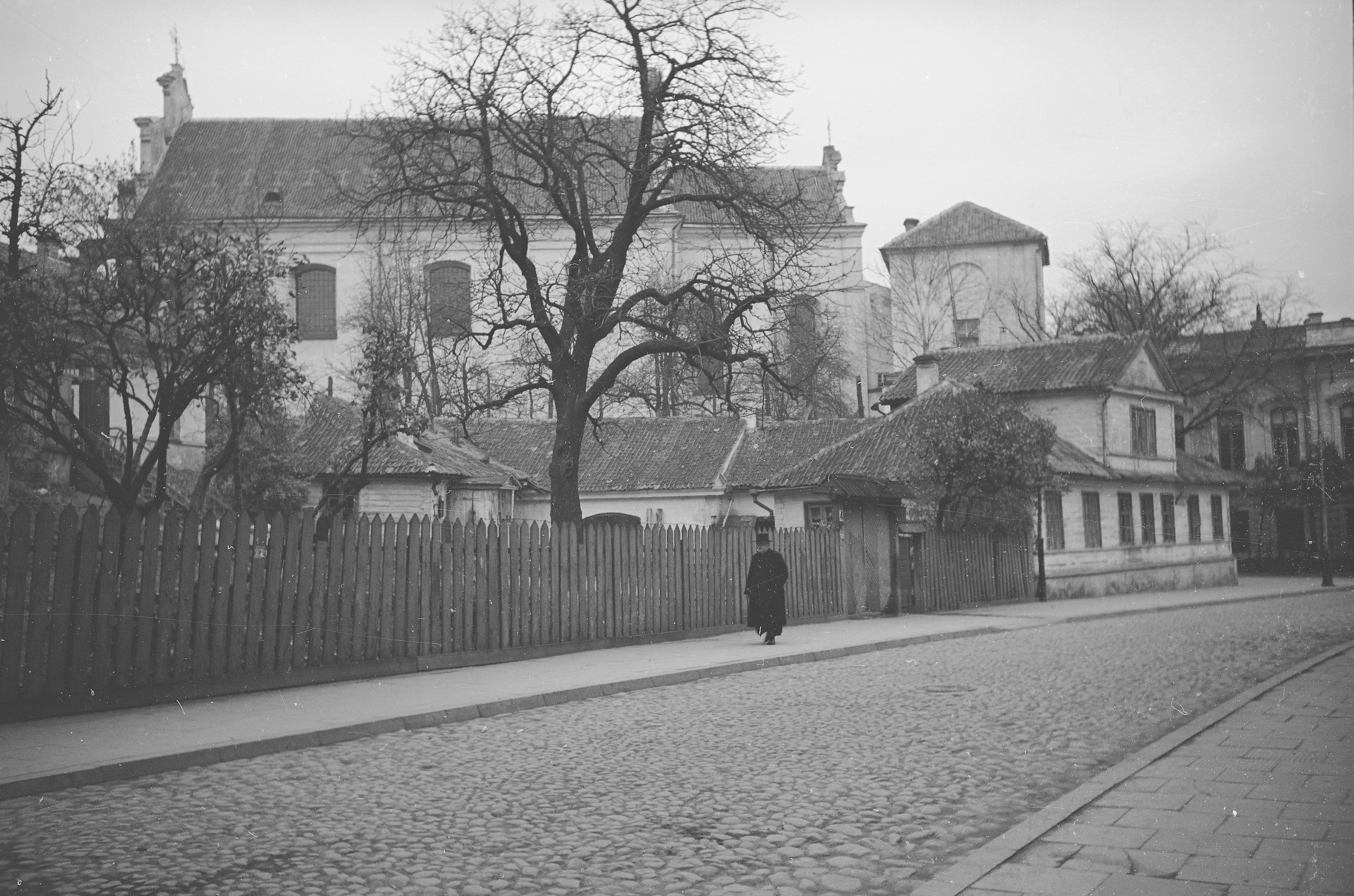
Side-view of the church in 1937

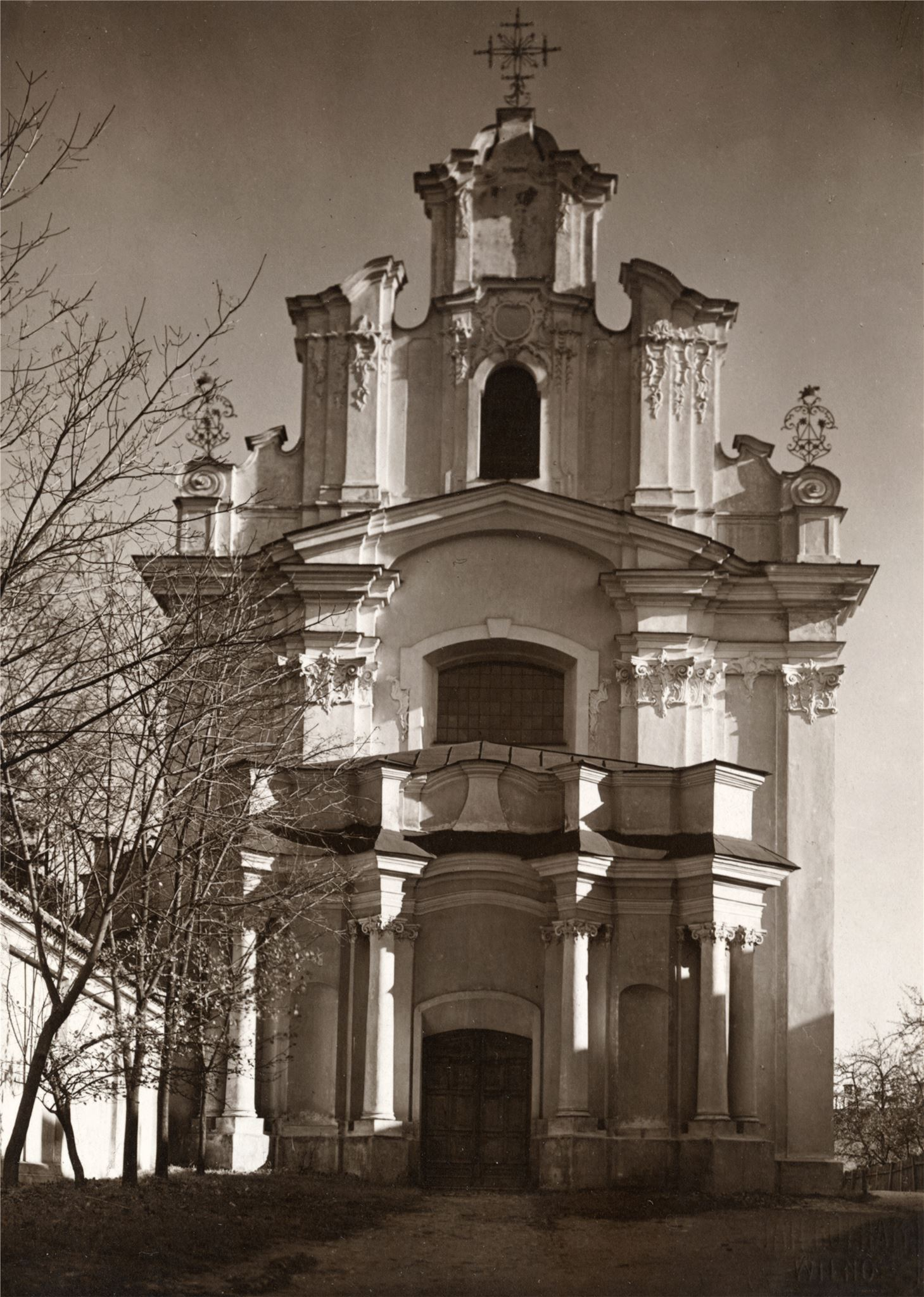
Main façade of the church in 1919

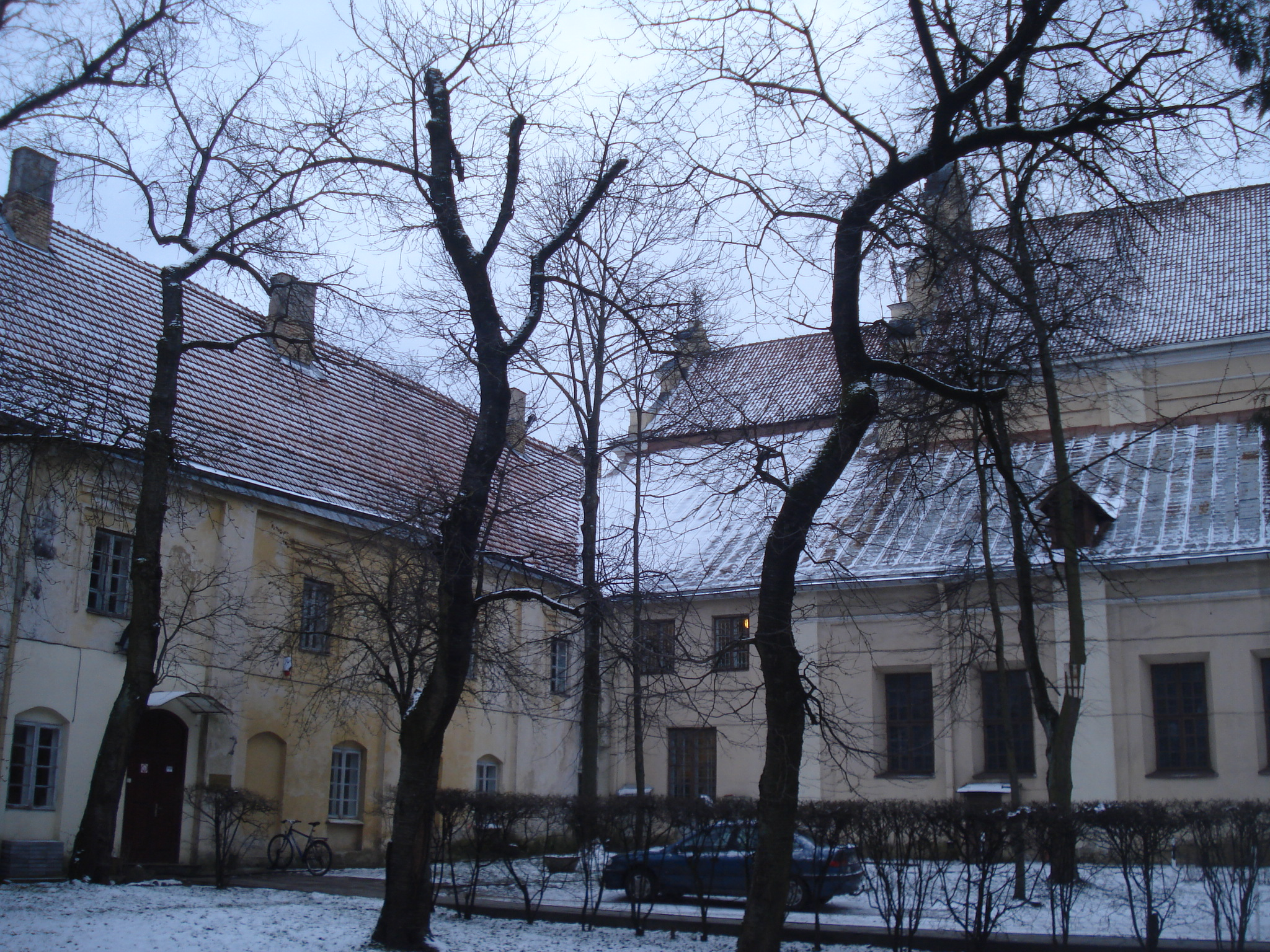
Former monastery buildings near the church

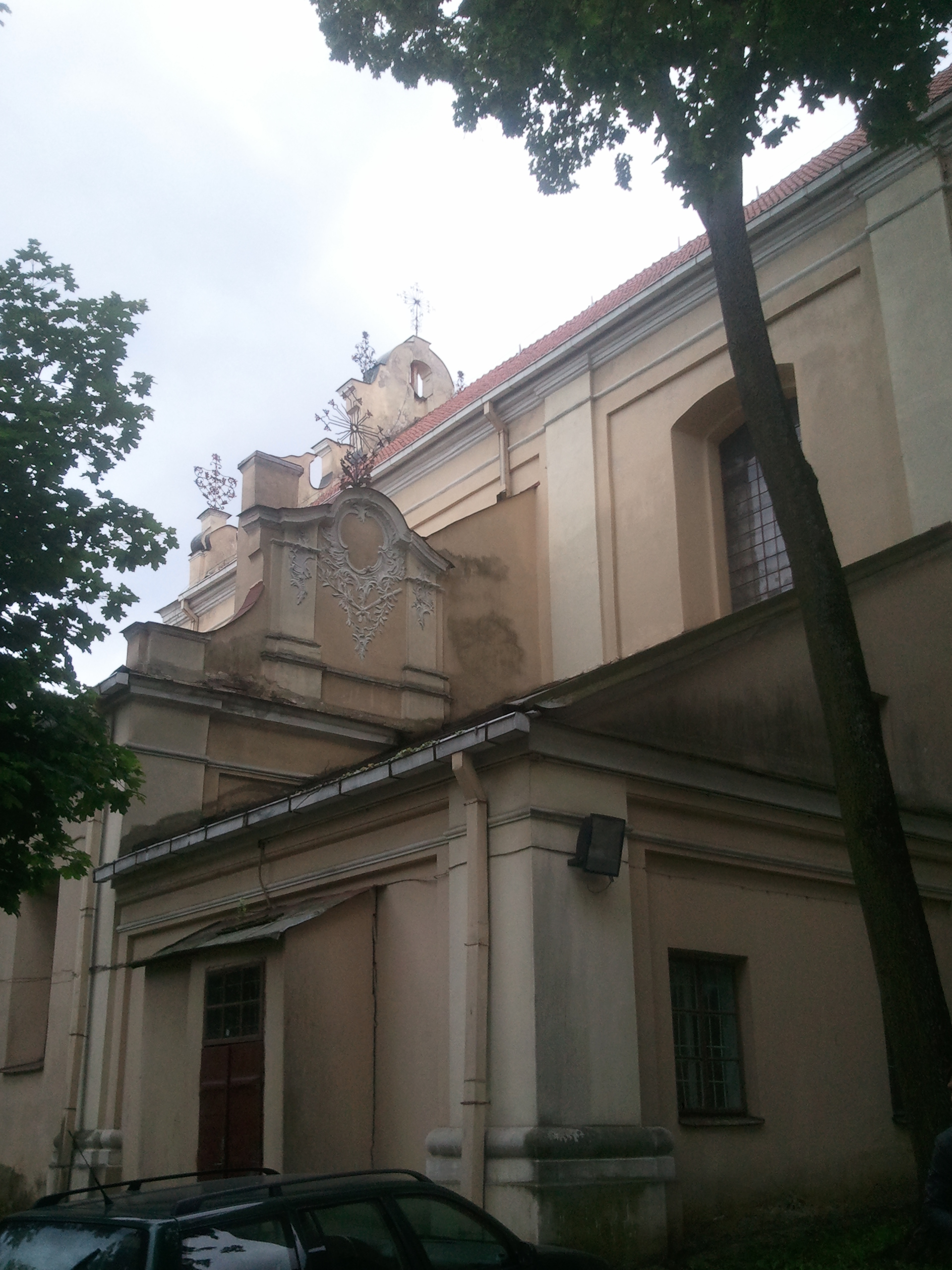
Chapel of Saint Barbara

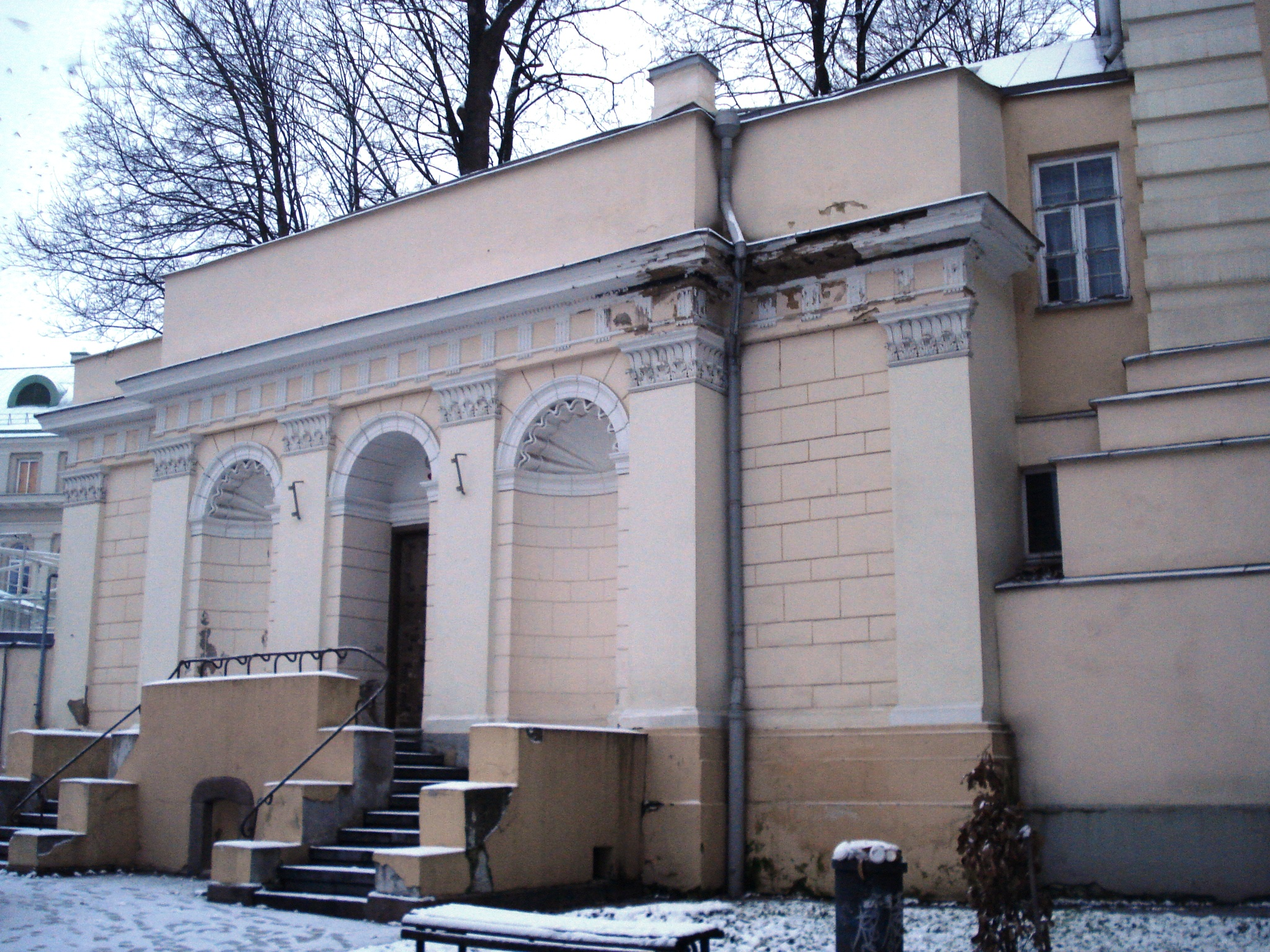
Entrance to the complex

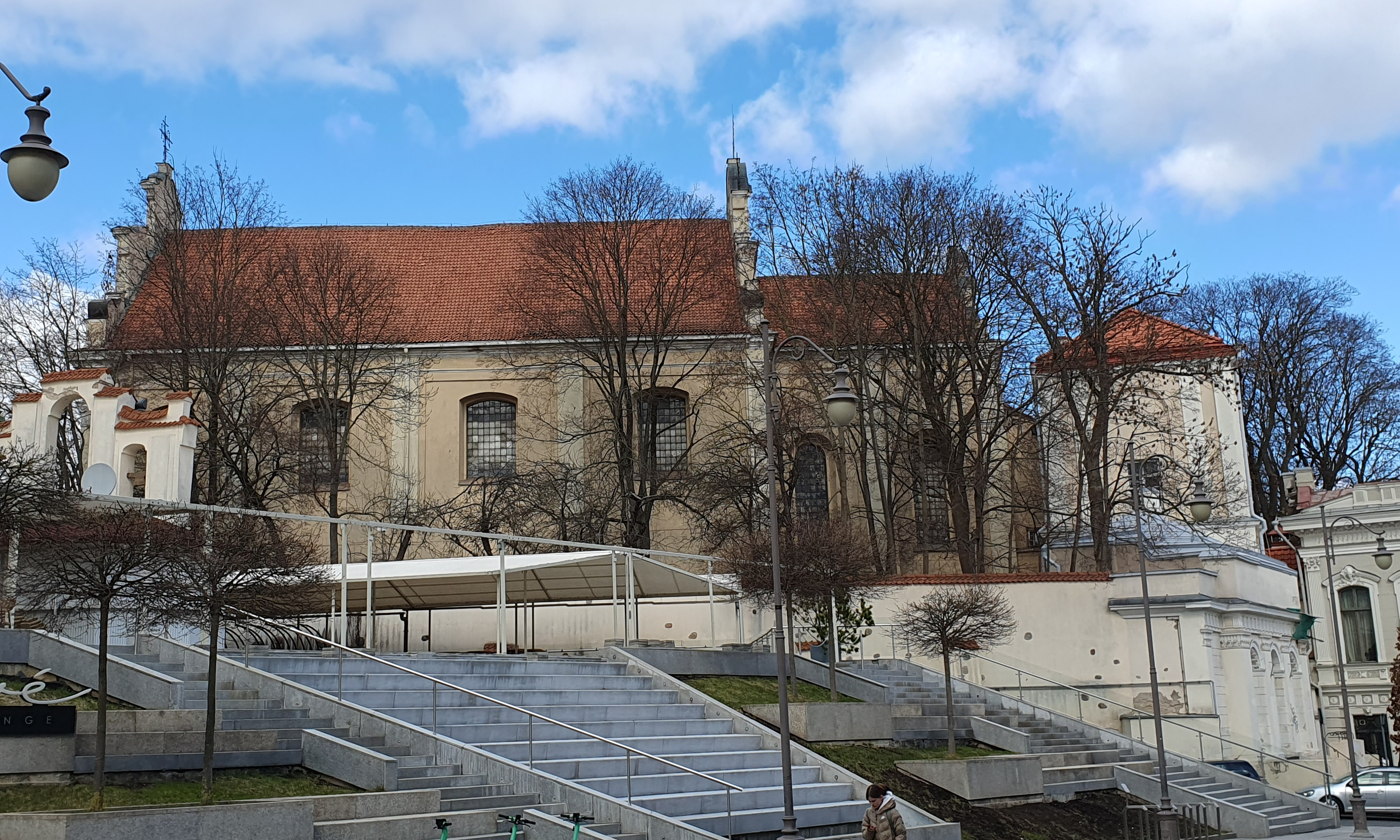
Side-view of the church in 2023

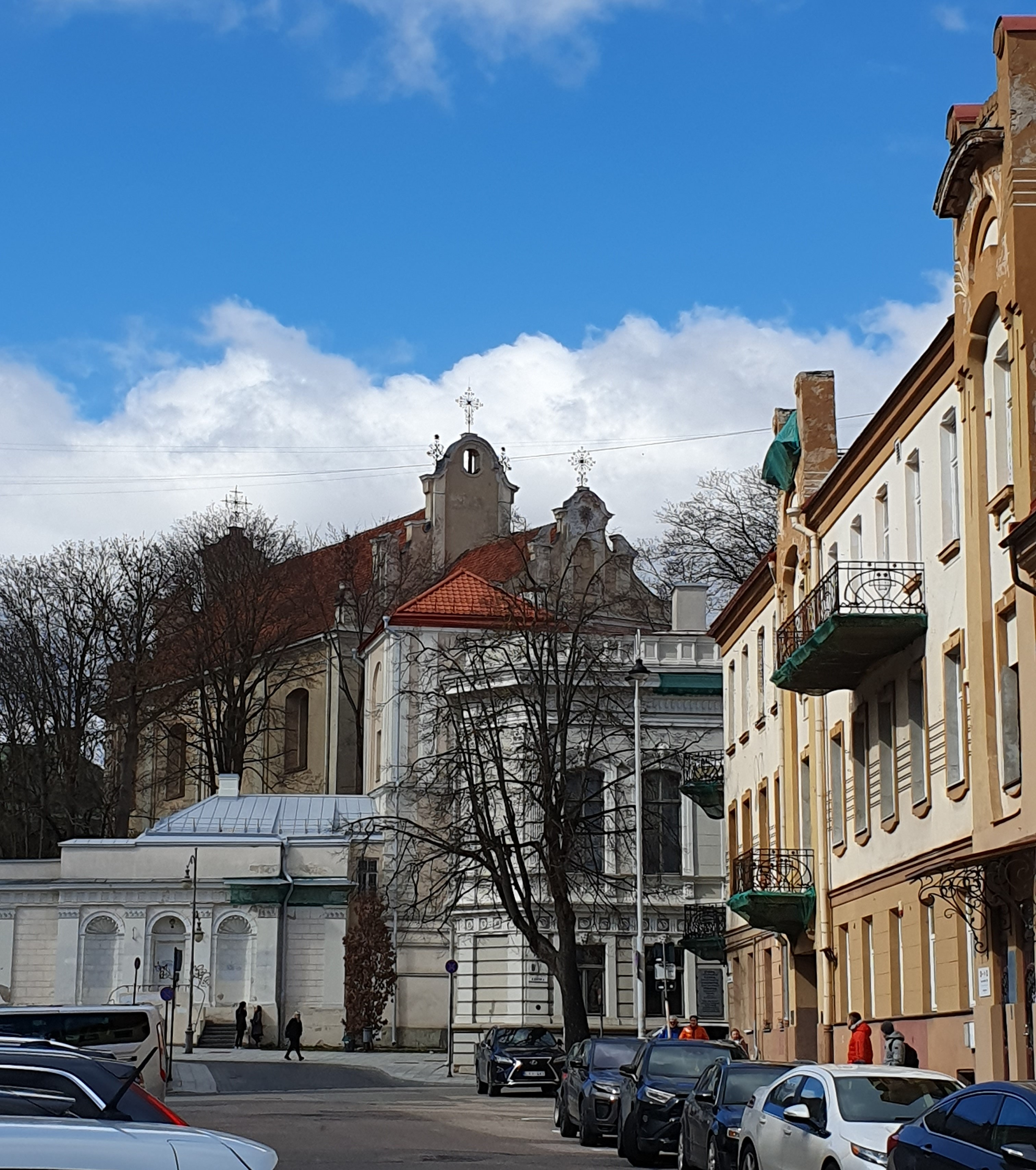
View towards the church from one of the Vilnius Old Town streets in 2023
