= Jan Zabrzeziński =

Lithuanian nobleman (1437–1508)

Jan Jurjewicz Zabrzeziński coat of arms

Jan Jurjewicz Zabrzeziński (Note: Jan Jurjewicz Zabrzeziński should not be confused with his son Jan Janowicz Zabrzeziński.) or Zaberezhsky (1437 – 2 February 1508) was a noble of Leliwa coat of arms from the Grand Duchy of Lithuania, who achieved the height of his influence during the reign of Alexander I Jagiellon (1492–1506). He was duke's marshal (1482–1496), regent of Polatsk (1484–1496), castellan of Trakai (1492–1498), voivode of Trakai (1498–1505), and Grand Marshal of Lithuania (1498–1508). Zabrzeziński was married to Anna, daughter of Jan, elder of Brest and Hrodna.

In the period 1476–1492, he witnessed three legal acts by the Grand Duke and was sent to two diplomatic missions (to the Grand Duchy of Moscow in 1484 and Kingdom of Poland in 1486). In 1501, as a member of the Lithuanian Council of Lords, he supported the proposed Union of Mielnik. Soon Zabrzeziński began a political rivalry with Michael Glinski, a quickly-rising favorite of Alexander Jagiellon. In 1504, under Glinski's influence, Alexander confiscated land possessions of Zabrzeziński's son-in-law near Lida. The conflict was soon suppressed by Alexander, who imposed large fines and removed Zabrzeziński from all of his positions (Grand Marshal, Voivode, Council of Lords). However, soon Zabrzeziński was reinstated as the Grand Marshal and received a generous benefice.

During the Battle of Kletsk against the Golden Horde in August 1506, Zabrzeziński disagreed with Glinki's command of the Lithuanian army and his men attacked first. They were easily defeated by the Tatars, who mockingly displayed severed heads of the Zabrzeziński's men. This disrespect enraged the remainder of the Lithuanian army, which attacked and soundly defeated the Horde.

After Alexander's death in August 1506, Zabrzeziński accused Glinski of high treason and poisoning Alexander. As the new King Sigismund I the Old did not clear his name, Glinski ordered Zabrzeziński killed in his residence near Hrodna in February 1508. This event is considered the beginning of Glinski's revolt against Sigismund I, which became part of the Muscovite–Lithuanian Wars.
