= Lan (river) =

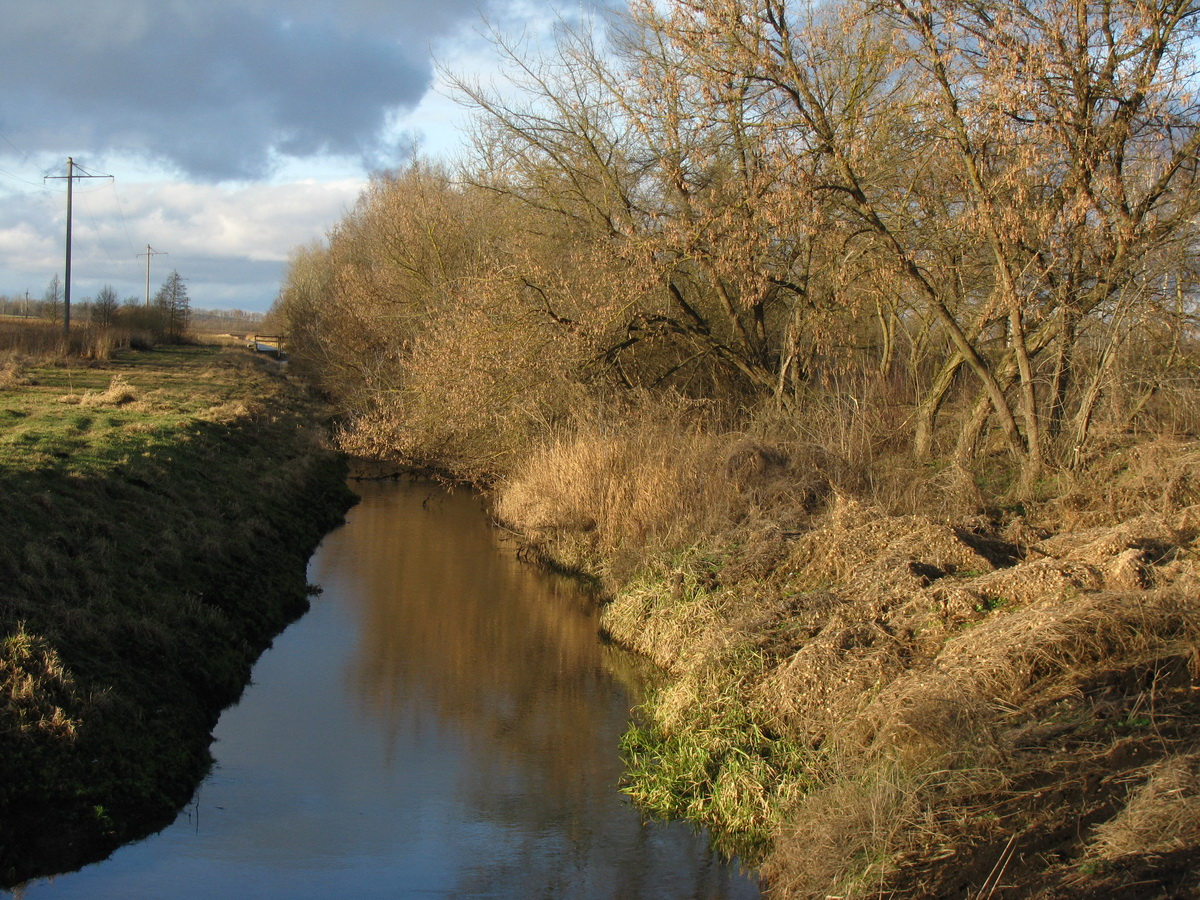

Location
- Country: Belarus

Physical characteristics
- Mouth: Pripyat
  - coordinates: 52.1562°N 27.2990°E
- Length: 147 km (91 mi)
- Basin size: 2,190 km^{2} (850 sq mi)

Basin features
- Progression: Pripyat→ Dnieper→ Dnieper–Bug estuary→ Black Sea

The Lan (Belarusian: Лань) is a river in Belarus, approximately 147 km (91 mi) long. It is a left tributary of the Pripyat.
