= Michael Glinski =

Eastern European noble

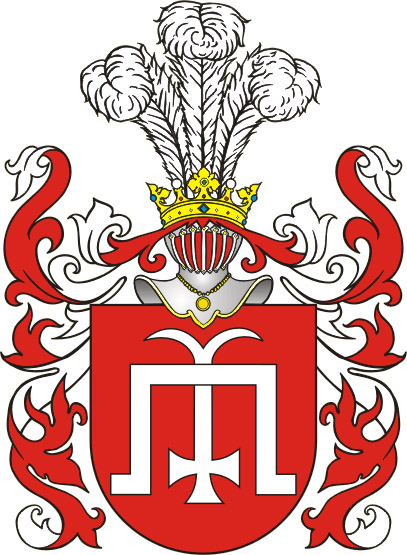
- Born: Mikhail Lvovich Glinski; Turov
- Died: September 24, 1534; Moscow, Grand Duchy of Moscow
- Occupations: Military commander, statesman
- Known for: Glinski's rebellion, tutor of Ivan the Terrible
- Parent: Lev Borisovich Glinski
- Relatives: Elena Glinskaya (niece)

Michael Lvovich Glinski or Glinsky (Lithuanian: Mykolas Glinskis; Russian: Михаил Львович Глинский; Polish: Michał Gliński; 1460s – 24 September 1534) was a noble from the Grand Duchy of Lithuania of distant Tatar extraction, who was also a tutor of his grand-nephew, Ivan the Terrible.

Glinski was born in Turov. He was a son of prince Lev Borisovich Glinski (d. 1495), and paternal uncle of Elena Glinskaya. As a young man, Glinski served in the court of Emperor Maximilian I and earned distinction for his military service. Around 1498 he returned to Lithuania and quickly rose in power and wealth, angering local nobles. Just after commanding the victorious Battle of Kletsk against the Crimean Khanate in August 1506, he was accused of conspiracy against the deceased Grand Duke Alexander Jagiellon and lost all his wealth. Glinski began an armed rebellion against Sigismund I, the new Grand Duke. The rebellion was unsuccessful and Glinsky retreated to the Grand Duchy of Moscow, where he served Vasili III of Russia. When the Muscovite–Lithuanian Wars renewed in 1512, Glinski was instrumental in helping Moscow to capture Smolensk, a major trading centre. However, he was not rewarded with the regency of the city. Angered, he planned to betray Vasili III, but the plot was discovered and he was imprisoned for 12 years. He was freed after his niece Elena Glinskaya, daughter of his brother Vasili Lvovich Glinski and Ana Jakšić, married Vasili III in 1526. Before his death in 1533, Vasili appointed Elena as regent for his underage sons Ivan and Yuri. Elena disapproved of Glinski's influence in state affairs and had him sent to prison, where he soon died of starvation.

== In western courts ==
The Glinski family claimed descent from Orthodox Hungarian nobles and Emir Mamai. As a young man Glinski was sent to the court of Emperor Maximilian I and served in the emperor's army. He won distinction during Maximilian's campaigns against Friesland in 1498 and was awarded the Order of the Golden Fleece. In the service of Albrecht of Saxony during the Italian Wars, he converted to Roman Catholicism. Glinski travelled extensively in Austria, Italy, and Spain. He also studied medicine at the University of Bologna; this fact was used against him in later life as such education introduced him to poisons. During his twelve-year tour of western courts, Glinski could boast of personal connections and relationships with many members of the nobility, including Emperor Maximilian I.

== Return to Lithuania ==
In late 1498, Glinski returned to Lithuania, where he quickly became a favourite and personal friend of Alexander Jagiellon, Grand Duke of Lithuania. Almost immediately upon return, Glinski became Grand Duke's vice-regent in Utena. He was appointed Court Marshal of Lithuania and became a member of the Lithuanian Council of Lords in 1500. The following year he was granted privileges to conduct lucrative trade in wax and oversee the coin mint in Vilnius. Due to his connections with Western Europe and knowledge of foreign languages, Glinski often acted as a foreign minister. Such a quick rise of a young man stirred up resentment among the local nobility. The greatest rivalry developed between Glinski and Jan Zabrzeziński, Voivode of Trakai. In 1504, Grand Duke Alexander, urged by Glinski, confiscated land possessions of Zabrzeziński's son-in-law. The following year, Zabrzeziński was fined, stripped of his titles, and banished from the Council of Lords along with his supporters. However, shortly after, Zabrzeziński reconciled with Alexander and was reinstated as the Grand Marshal of Lithuania. In August 1506, Glinski replaced Stanisław Kiszka, the Great Hetman of Lithuania, who had fallen ill, as the commander of the Lithuanian army during the Battle of Kleck. He led the Lithuanians to a decisive victory against the Crimean Khanate.

== Glinski's rebellion ==
Alexander Jagiellon died in August 1506 and was succeeded by his brother Sigismund I. Even before Alexander's death, Zabrzeziński renewed the rivalry and spread rumours that Glinski planned to poison Alexander and even hoped to seize the throne himself. Such rumours were effective: Glinski lost his privileges and titles, while his brother Ivan lost Kiev Voivodeship. As his trial was postponed and Sigismund I travelled to Poland to settle his coronation as King of Poland, Glinski, and his relatives began an armed rebellion against Sigismund I. On 7 February 1508, Glinski attacked Hrodna and decapitated Zabrzeziński. His men then unsuccessfully attacked Kaunas Castle in an attempt to liberate imprisoned Sheikh Ahmed, the deposed Khan of the Great Horde. He then planned but never began an attack on Vilnius. Glinski proclaimed himself a defender of the discriminated Eastern Orthodox believers and envisioned the establishment of the Duchy of Boristen (after Borysthenes, the ancient Latin name for the Dnieper River) with capital in Smolensk. Glinski's rebellion gained limited support among Orthodox nobility and became intertwined with the Muscovite–Lithuanian War of 1507–1508. Despite support from the Grand Duchy of Moscow, Glinski failed to capture Minsk, Slutsk, Orsha, Mstsislaw, Krychaw. By 1508, Glinski retreated to Moscow and pledged allegiance to Vasili III of Russia.

== In Moscow's service ==
In 1512, Muscovy resumed war with Lithuania and besieged Smolensk three times. Glinski used his Western connections to bring a number of artillerymen, who were instrumental in capturing the city in July 1514. Glinski expected that for his services he would become a vice-regent of Smolensk. However, Vasili III chose Vasily Nemoy Shuysky. Enraged Glinski opened negotiations with Sigismund I – Glinski would return to Lithuania and help to recapture Smolensk if the Grand Duke guaranteed him immunity. The negotiations were discovered by the Russians and Glinski was arrested. Imprisoned and awaiting execution, he converted back to Eastern Orthodoxy. This move possibly softened Vasili's resolve and Glinski was pardoned.

Glinski spent 12 years in prison until 1526 when Vasili III married his niece Elena Glinskaya. Glinski regained some of his former wealth and power as a loyal servant of Vasili III. In 1533, Vasili III died of an infection to a leg wound. Before his death, Vasili appointed Elena as regent for his underage sons Ivan and Yuri. Glinski became a member of the regency council, and soon proved to be a political rival of Elena and her lover Prince Obolensky for the influence in the regency council. Elena spread rumours that Glinski quickened Vasili's death with poison as he did to Alexander Jagiellon in Lithuania. In August 1534, he was again taken to prison, where he died on 24 September of starvation.

== Sources ==
- Payne, Robert; Romanoff, Nikita (2002) [1975]. Ivan the Terrible. New York: Cooper Square Press. ISBN 9780815412298.
- Pushkareva, Natalia (1997). Women in Russian History: From the Tenth to the Twentieth Century. Armonk, NY: M.E.Sharpe. ISBN 9780765632708.
