= Klyetsk district =

District of Minsk region, Belarus

Klyetsk district Клецкі раён (Belarusian) Клецкий район (Russian)
- District
- Flag Coat of arms

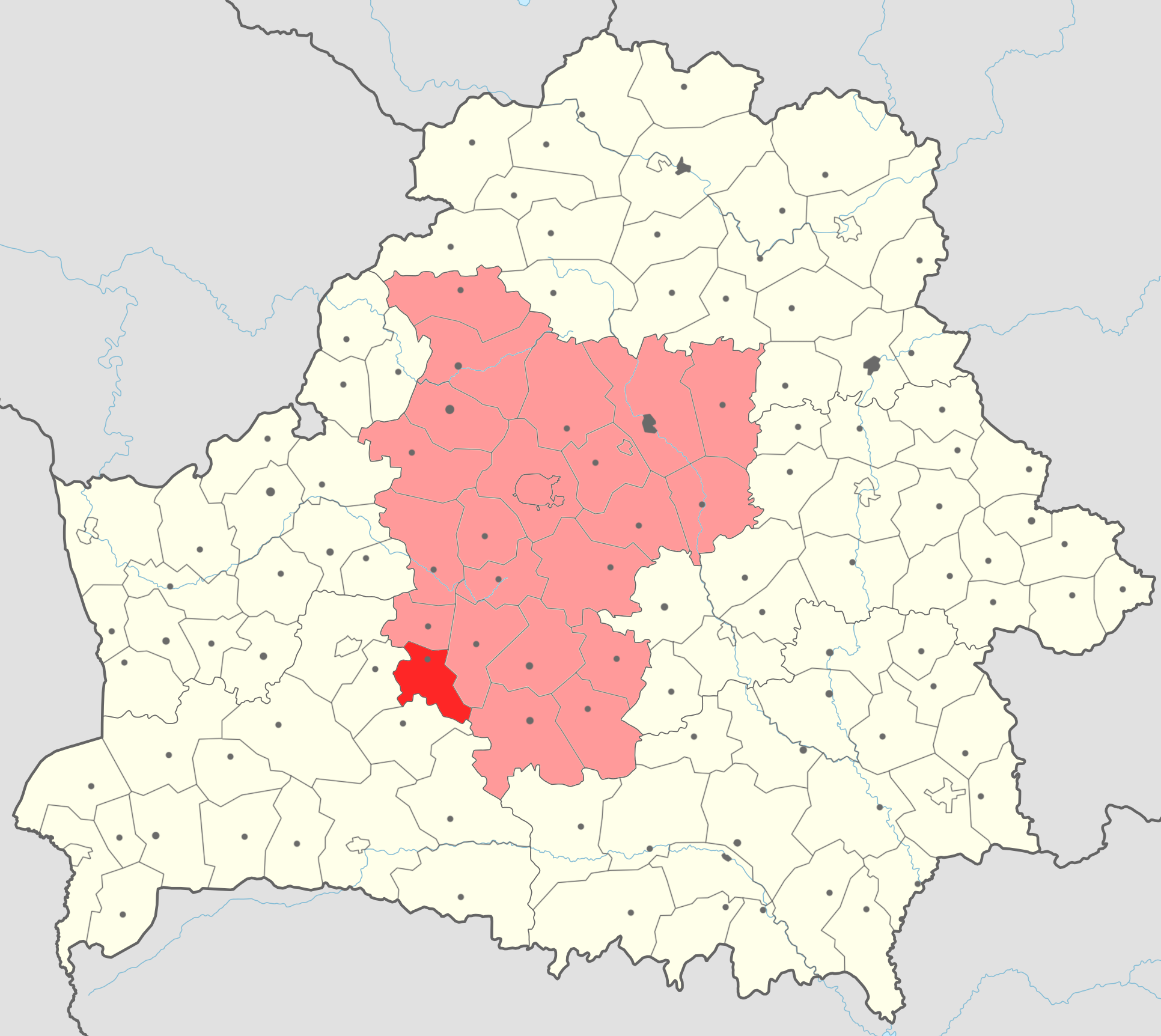
- Coordinates: 53°03′49″N 26°38′14″E
- Country: Belarus
- Region: Minsk region
- Administrative center: Klyetsk

Area
  - District: 974 km^{2} (376 sq mi)

Population (2024)
  - District: 25,611
  - Density: 26.3/km^{2} (68.1/sq mi)
  - Urban: 11,248
  - Rural: 14,363
- Time zone: UTC+3 (MSK)
- Website: Kletsk ispolkom website

Klyetsk district or Klieck district (Belarusian: Клецкі раён; Russian: Клецкий район) is a district (raion) of Minsk region in Belarus. Its administrative center is the town of Klyetsk. As of 2024, it has a population of 25,611.
