= Battle of Myadel =

1659 battle of the Russo-Polish War

- Part of the Russo-Polish War (1654–1667)
Date	February 8, 1659
Location	Myadzel, Belarus 54°52′N 26°56′E
Result	Russian victory

Belligerents
Polish–Lithuanian Commonwealth	Russian Tsardom

Commanders and leaders
Mikołaj Judycki; Władysław Wołłowicz	Ivan Khovansky

Strength
6,000	2,000

Casualties and losses
200 POW, artillery, supply wagons	

The Battle of Myadel took place on February 8, 1659, during the Russo-Polish War of 1654–1667, near the town of Myadzel, in present-day Belarus. The Russian army of Novgorod led by Ivan Khovansky defeated the Polish–Lithuanians led by Mikołaj Judycki and Władysław Wołłowicz. As a result, the Polish–Lithuanian army retreated to the safety of the walls of Lyakhovichi.

== Background ==
At the end of 1658, significant Polish–Lithuanian forces placed themselves in the region of Myadel, an area which previously swore a loyalty oath to the Russian Tsar. Many of the nobles (szlachta), however, followed the appeal of Hetman Paweł Jan Sapieha to join the Commonwealth army. After the signing of the treaty of Valiesar the Russian army could bring its troops to Lithuania that were so far involved in fighting the Swedes. The Russians entered Lithuania and took Braslaw. Some Lithuanian szlachta once again switched the sides and deserted to the Russians. However, the Commonwealth army had still a considerable number of 6,000 soldiers.

== Battle ==
On January 24, a Russian cavalry corps ("yertoul") counting up to 1,000 men was sent out to capture some prisoners who would provide important information on Lithuanians. The corps met the avantgarde of the Lithuanian army near the village of Postavy and smashed it, having captured the flag and many prisoners. Several days later, Khovansky with other troops caught up.

On January 29, the yertoul defeated another Lithuanian detachment near Myadel and pursued it until the town, killing many of its men. Here, the Russians met the main forces of the enemy. In the following clash, the Lithuanians began to prevail, however the Russian reinforcement of 1,000 cavalrymen of Khovansky arrived. Since the yertoul itself was relatively numerous with 1,000 men the Lithuanians believed the Khovansky army was much bigger and panic spread when Khovansky troops appeared on horizon. The effect was overwhelming: the mass of Lithuanians fled the battlefield, running for their lives, and stopped just in Novahrudak. The Russians pursued them up to 30 miles and captured the supply wagons, artillery and 200 men.

== Consequences ==
As a result of this victory, the Russian army took the strategic initiative and reclaimed its control of big parts of Grand Duchy of Lithuania. The Russian army command began planning an offensive on Warsaw. For the victory at Myadel, Khovansky got the title of a boyar and was made namestnik of Vyatka.

== Literature ==
- Малов А.В. Русско-польская война 1654-1667 гг. Москва, Цейхгауз, 2006. ISBN 5-94038-111-1.
