= Battle of Zahal =

Battle during the Khmelnytsky Uprising

- Part of the Khmelnytsky Uprising
Date	17–18 June 1649
Location	Zahal, Minsk Voivodeship, Polish–Lithuanian Commonwealth 51°54′N 29°48′E
Result	Polish–Lithuanian victory

Belligerents
(Cossack Hetmanate) Zaporozhian Host; Crimean Khanate	Polish–Lithuanian Commonwealth

Commanders and leaders
Illia Holota †	Władysław Wołłowicz; Walerian Falencki (WIA); Jan Donowaj; Samuel Smólski

Strength
3,000 Zaporozhian Cossacks and Crimean Tatars	1,750 Polish–Lithuanian cavalry and infantry; 200 German infantry

Casualties and losses
1,600 killed and wounded	216 killed and wounded

The Battle of Zahal (Note: Belarusian: Бітва пад Загаллем; Ukrainian: Битва під Загалом; Polish: Bitwa pod Zahalem) was fought between the Zaporozhian Host and the Crimean Khanate against the Polish–Lithuanian Commonwealth as a part of the Khmelnytsky Uprising on 17–18 June 1649. Near the site of the present-day town of Zahal in Belarus, the combined forces of the Zaporozhians and Tatars under the command of Polkovnyk Illia Holota were defeated by the Polish–Lithuanian Commonwealth's forces under the command of Hetman Władysław Wołłowicz, Walerian Falencki, Jan Donowaj and Samuel Smólski.

== Background ==
The Zaporozhian and Tatar forces numbered around 3,000 men, the core of which was part of the Kaniv Regiment and Tatar cavalry, while the rest were rebellious Ukrainian peasants. The Polish–Lithuanian troops numbered approximately 1,550 men and were commanded by Hetman Władysław Wołłowicz. The Zaporozhians and Tatars got through by the boats to Krasnasiellie on the Prypiat and then continued by land.

== Battle ==
On 17–18 June 1649, the Zaporozhian-Tatar attacked the Polish–Lithuanian forces, which were camped near the village of Zahal. The Polish–Lithuanian forces were unexpectedly reinforced by the troops of Hrehore Mirski, numbering around 150 dragoons and 200 German mercenary infantry. Thanks to the relief attack on the rear of the Zaporozhian and Tatars, the Polish–Lithuanian forces from the camp in Zahal were able to enter the field and soundly defeat the Zaporozhian-Tatar force.

== Casualties ==
Polkovnyk Illia Holota died in combat while the total Zaporozhian and Tatar casualties reached up to 1,600 men.

On the Polish–Lithuanian side, casualties amounted to around 216 men. Among others, one of the commanders, Walerian Falencki, was injured in the battle.

== Bibliography ==
- Poleskie ostatki. W: Grzegorz Rąkowski: Czar Polesia. Pruszków: Oficyna Wydawnicza "Rewasz", 2005, p. 486, seria: Smak Kresów. ISBN 83-85557-92-X.
- Piotr Borawski: Tatarzy w dawnej Rzeczypospolitej. Warszawa: Ludowa Spółdzielnia Wydawnicza, 1986, p. 134. ISBN 83-205-3747-9.
- Tomasz Ciesielski: Od Batohu do Żwańca. Wojna na Ukrainie i w księstwach naddunajskich 1652–1653. Warszawa: „Inforteditions”, 2008. ISBN 978-83-89943-23-1.
- Henryk Wisner Janusz Radziwiłł 1612–1655, Wydawnictwo MADA, Warszawa 2000
