= Hungarian Rifle Company of the Lithuanian Grand Hetman =

- Active: 1717–1793
- Country: Grand Duchy of Lithuania
- Type: Infantry

The Hungarian Rifle Company of the Lithuanian Grand Hetman (Lithuanian: Didžiosios Buožės šaulių vėliava; Polish: Chorągiew Węgierska (Strzelecka) Buławy Wiel. Ks. Lit.) was a military unit of the Grand Duchy of Lithuania.

== History ==
The company was formed in 1717. The rifle company's chef was the Grand Hetman of Lithuania and the unit was always present wherever he was. It was disbanded in 1793.

== Commanders ==
No.	Portrait	Commander	Took office	Left office	Time in office
1	Oborski	Captain; Oborski	1787	1789	2 years, 0 days
2	Suchodolski	Pułkownik; Suchodolski	1789	1792	3 years, 0 days
3	Felicjan Bontani	Captain; Felicjan Bontani	1792	1793	1 year, 0 days

== Bibliography ==
=== References ===
- Baniusevič, Aleksandr (2017-09-26). "Lietuvos valstybės istorijos archyvas - Fondas Nr. 4 (SA) - Abiejų tautų karo komisija" (PDF). archyvai.lt (in Lithuanian). Vilnius.
- Gembarzewski, Bronisław (1925), Rodowody pułków polskich i oddziałów równorzędnych od r. 1717 do r. 1831 (in Polish), Warszawa: Towarzystwo Wiedzy Wojskowej
- Rospond, Vincent W. (2013). Commonwealth Armies of the Partitions 1770 - 1794. Great Britain: Osprey Publishing. ISBN 978-1-84908855-8.
