= Hungarian Company of the Lithuanian Field Hetman =

- Active: 1717–1793
- Country: Grand Duchy of Lithuania
- Type: Infantry

The Hungarian Company of the Lithuanian Field Hetman (Lithuanian: Lauko etmono vengrų vėliava or Lauko Buožės grenadierių vėliava; Polish: Chorągiew Węgierska (Grenadjerska) Buławy Pol. W. Ks. Lit.) was a military unit of the Grand Duchy of Lithuania. The unit was considered as the Lithuanian army's grenadiers.

== History ==
The company was formed in 1717. The grenadier company's chef was the Field Hetman of Lithuania and the unit was always present wherever he was. The company had 80 soldiers in 1786. It was disbanded in 1793.

== Captains ==
No.	Portrait	Commander	Took office	Left office	Time in office
1	Jerzy Grzymała	Rotmistrz; Jerzy Grzymała	1777	1778	1 year, 179 days
2	Jan Liebe	Rotmistrz; Jan Liebe	1778	1793	14 years, 186 days

== Bibliography ==
=== References ===
- Baniusevič, Aleksandr (2017-09-26). "Lietuvos valstybės istorijos archyvas - Fondas Nr. 4 (SA) - Abiejų tautų karo komisija" (PDF). www.archyvai.lt (in Lithuanian).
- Daujotas, Jonas (1997). Surgailis, Gintautas (ed.). "LDK (Lietuvos Didžiosios Kunigaikštystės) Kariuomenė XVIII a.". Karo Archyvas (in Lithuanian). XIV. Lietuvos Respublikos krašto apsaugos ministerija.
- Gembarzewski, Bronisław (1925), Rodowody pułków polskich i oddziałów równorzędnych od r. 1717 do r. 1831 (in Polish), Warszawa: Towarzystwo Wiedzy Wojskowej
- Rospond, Vincent W. (2013). Commonwealth Armies of the Partitions 1770 - 1794. Great Britain: Osprey Publishing. ISBN 978-1-84908855-8.
