= Michał Józef Massalski =

Polish–Lithuanian nobleman (c. 1700 – 1768)

Michał Józef Masalski
- Prince; Marshal of the Convocation Sejm; Grand Hetman of Lithuania
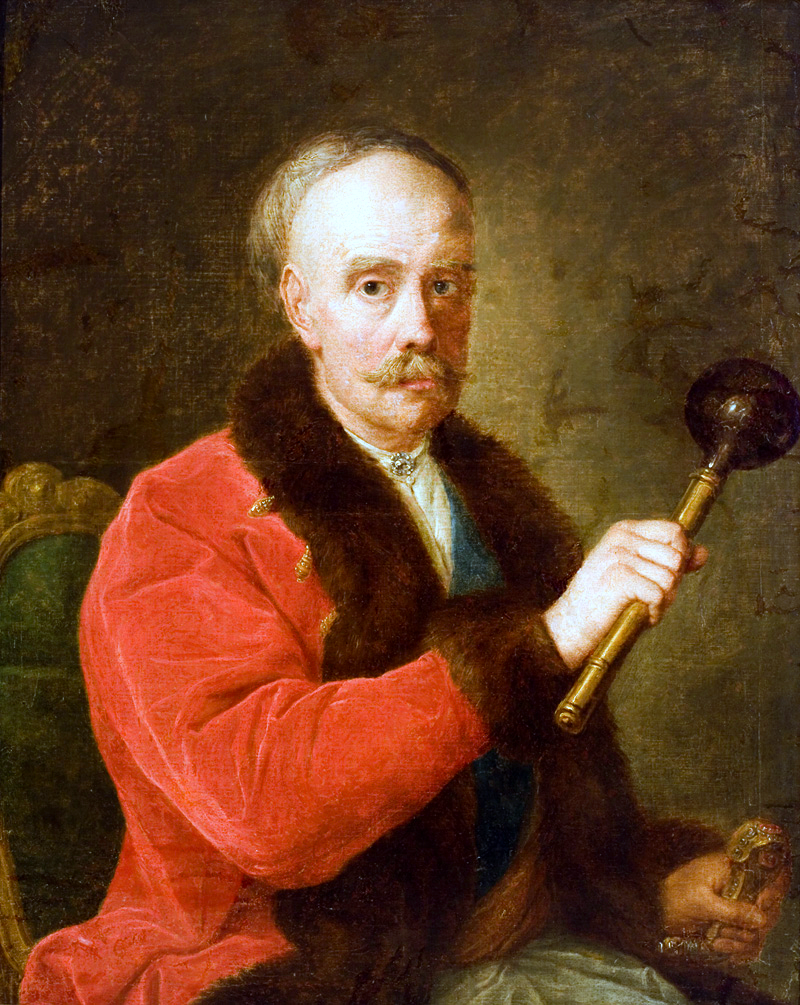

- Coat of arms: Masalski
- Born: c. 1700; Trakai, Grand Duchy of Lithuania
- Died: 26 January 1768
- Family: Masalski
- Consort: Franciszka Ogińska
- Issue: Kazimierz Masalski; Jozef Adrian Masalski; Jan Massalski; Ignacy Jakub Massalski; Katarzyna Masalska
- Father: Jan Masalski
- Mother: Anna Wołłowicz

Prince Michał Józef Masalski (Lithuanian: Mykolas Juozapas Masalskis; c. 1700 – 1768) was a Polish–Lithuanian nobleman (szlachcic).

He was Grand Writer of Lithuania and starost of Grodno from 1726, voivode of Mscislaw Voivodeship from 1737, castellan of Trakai from 1742, castellan of Vilnius and Field Lithuanian Hetman from 1744, and Grand Lithuanian Hetman from 1762. He was Marshal of the Convocation Sejm from 27 April to 23 May 1733 in Warsaw.

== Awards ==
- Knight of the Order of the White Eagle
