= Hetmans of the Polish–Lithuanian Commonwealth =

Historical high-ranking military officers

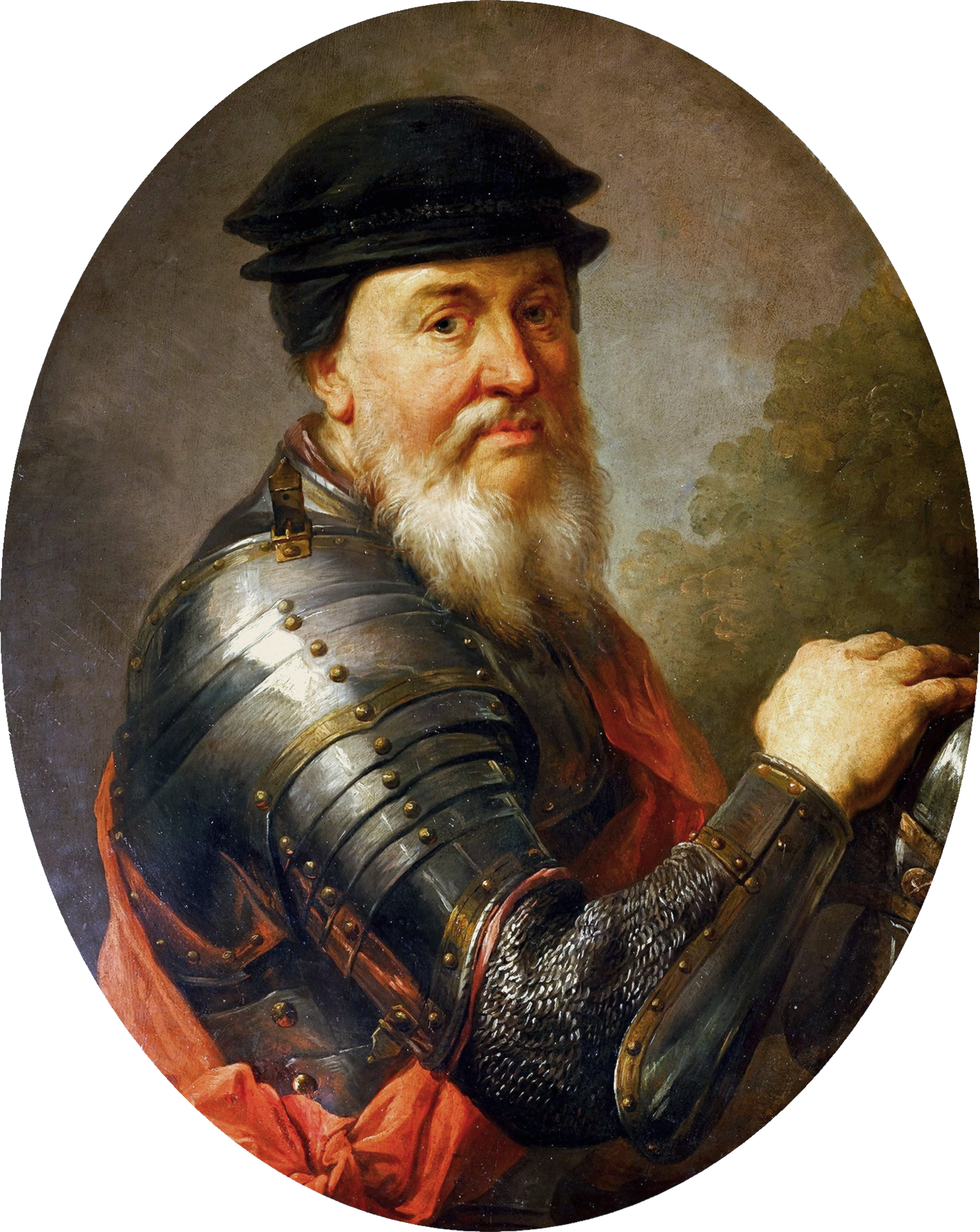
Jan Tarnowski

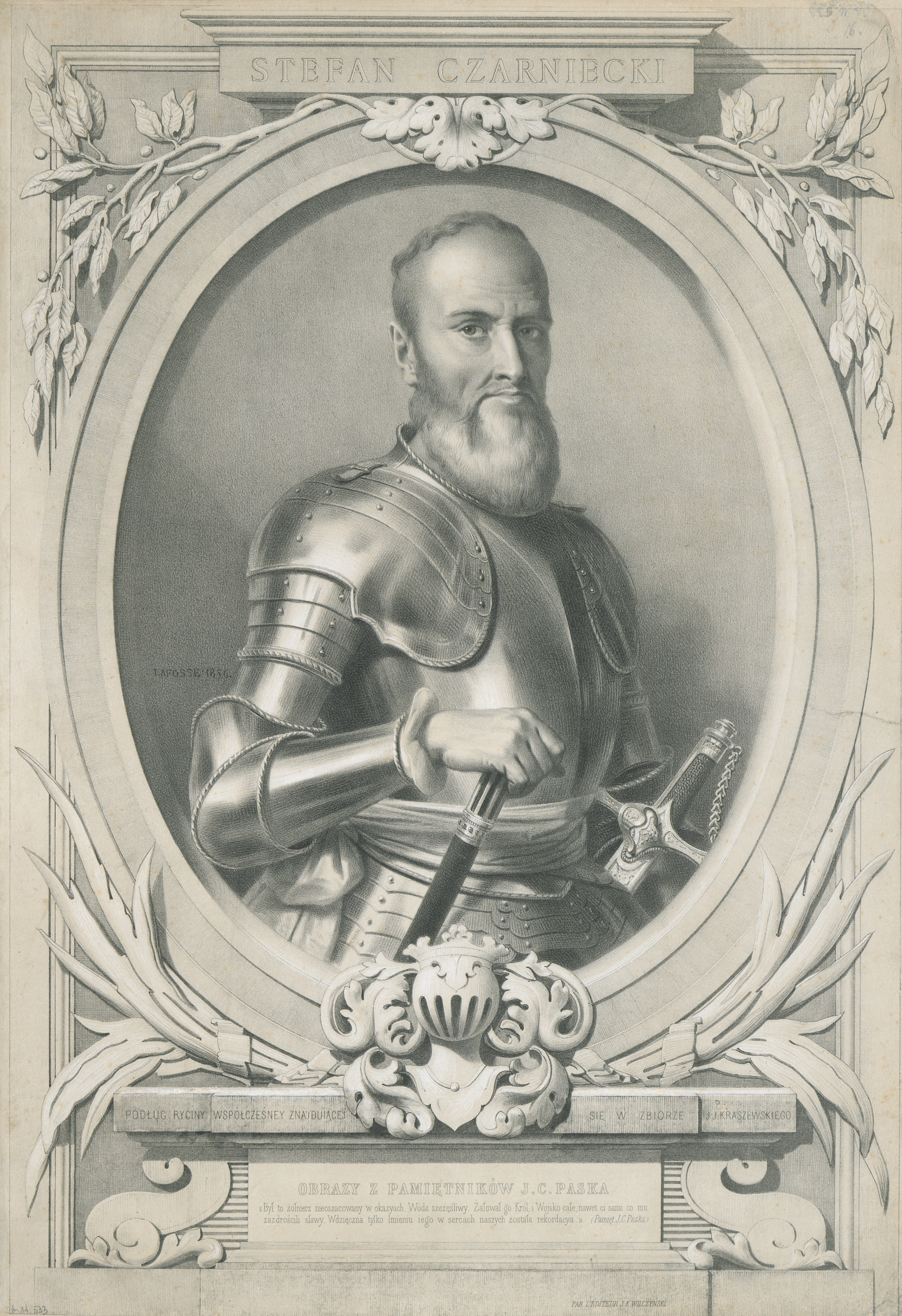
Stefan Czarniecki

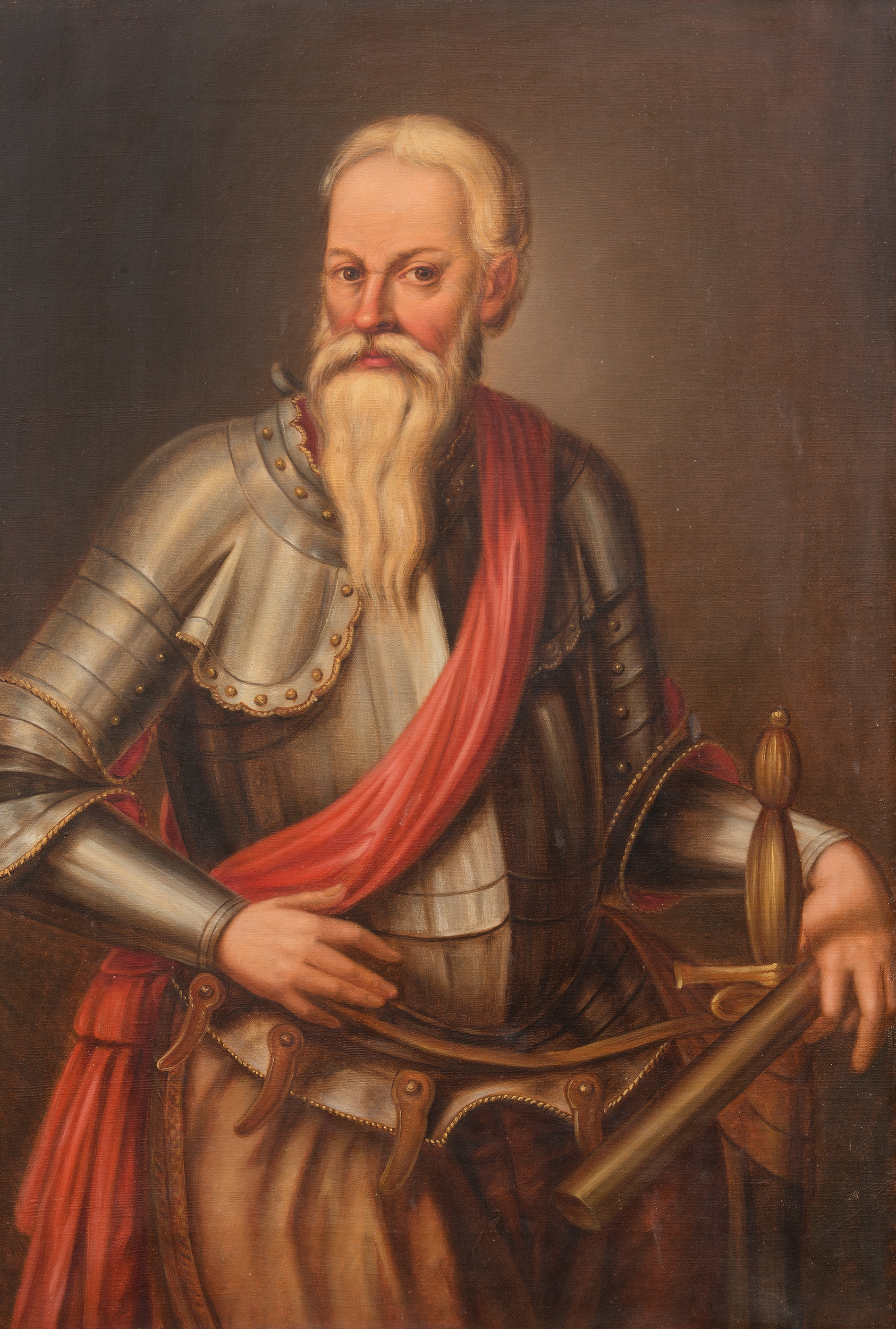
Mikołaj Radziwiłł the Red

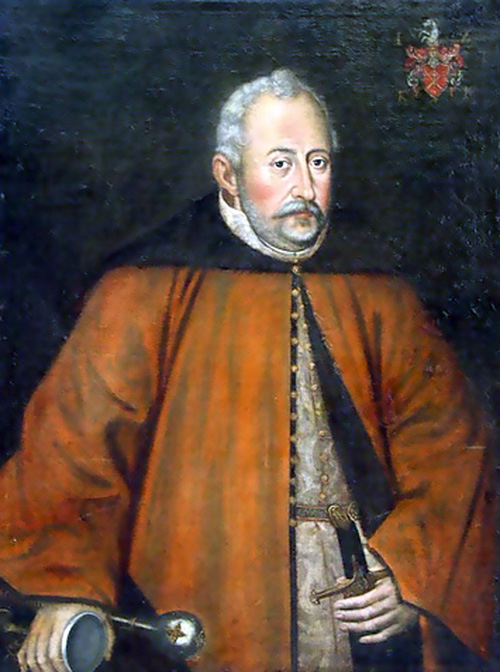
Jan Zamoyski

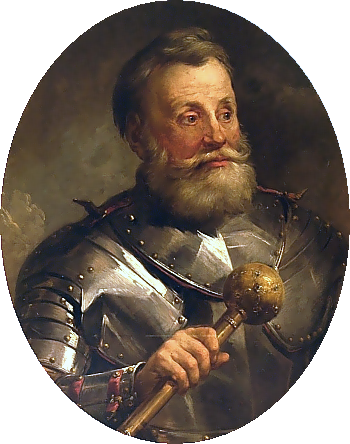
Jan Karol Chodkiewicz

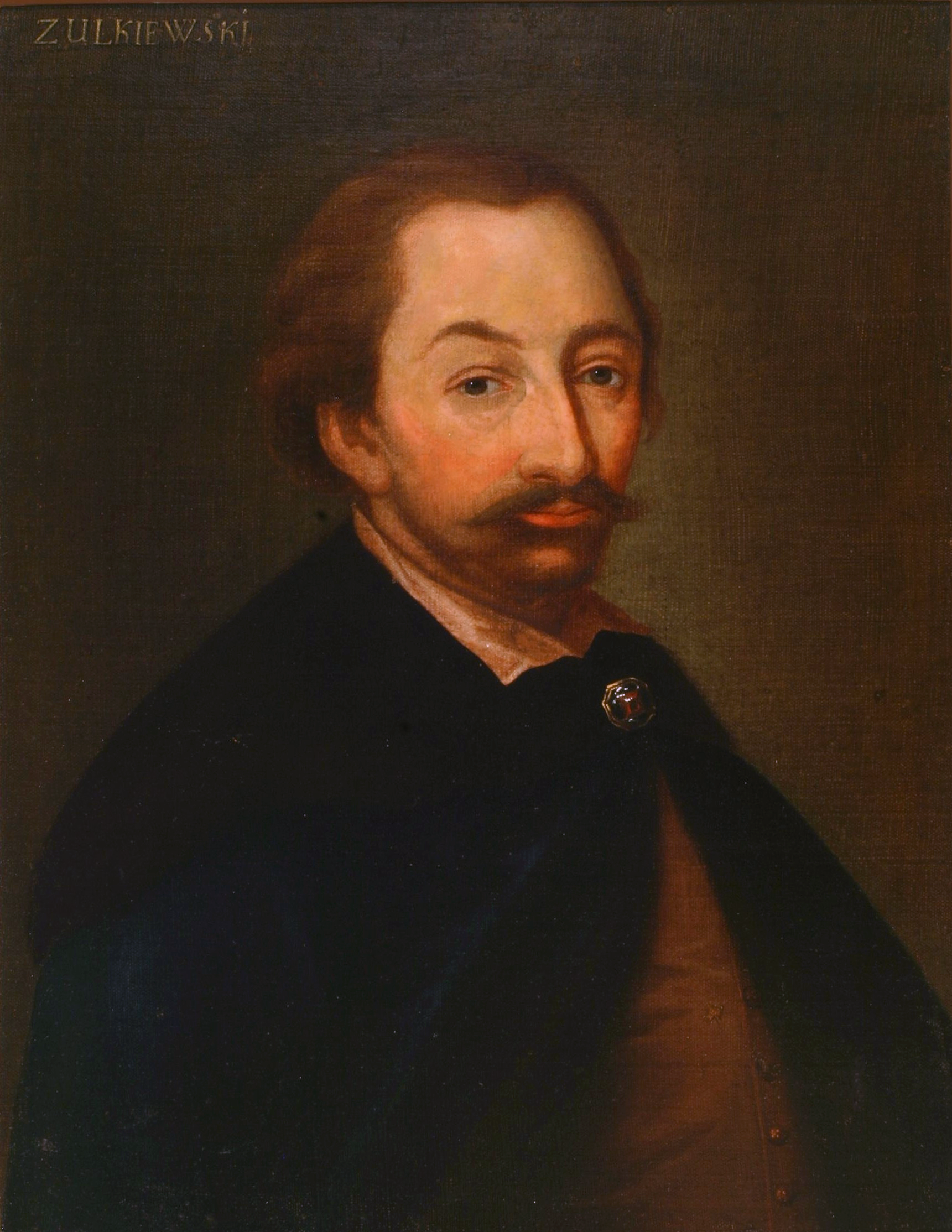
Stanisław Żółkiewski

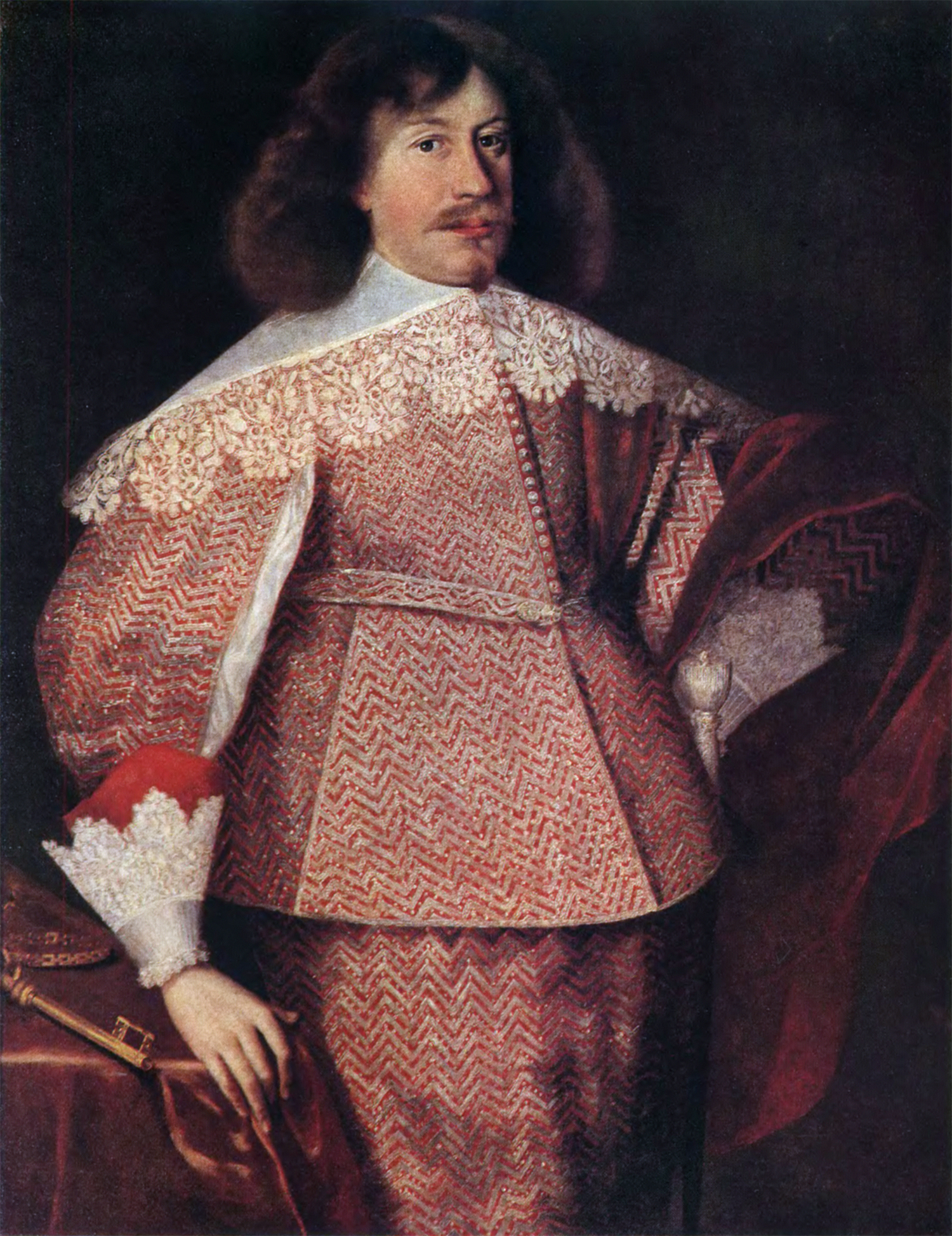
Janusz Radziwiłł

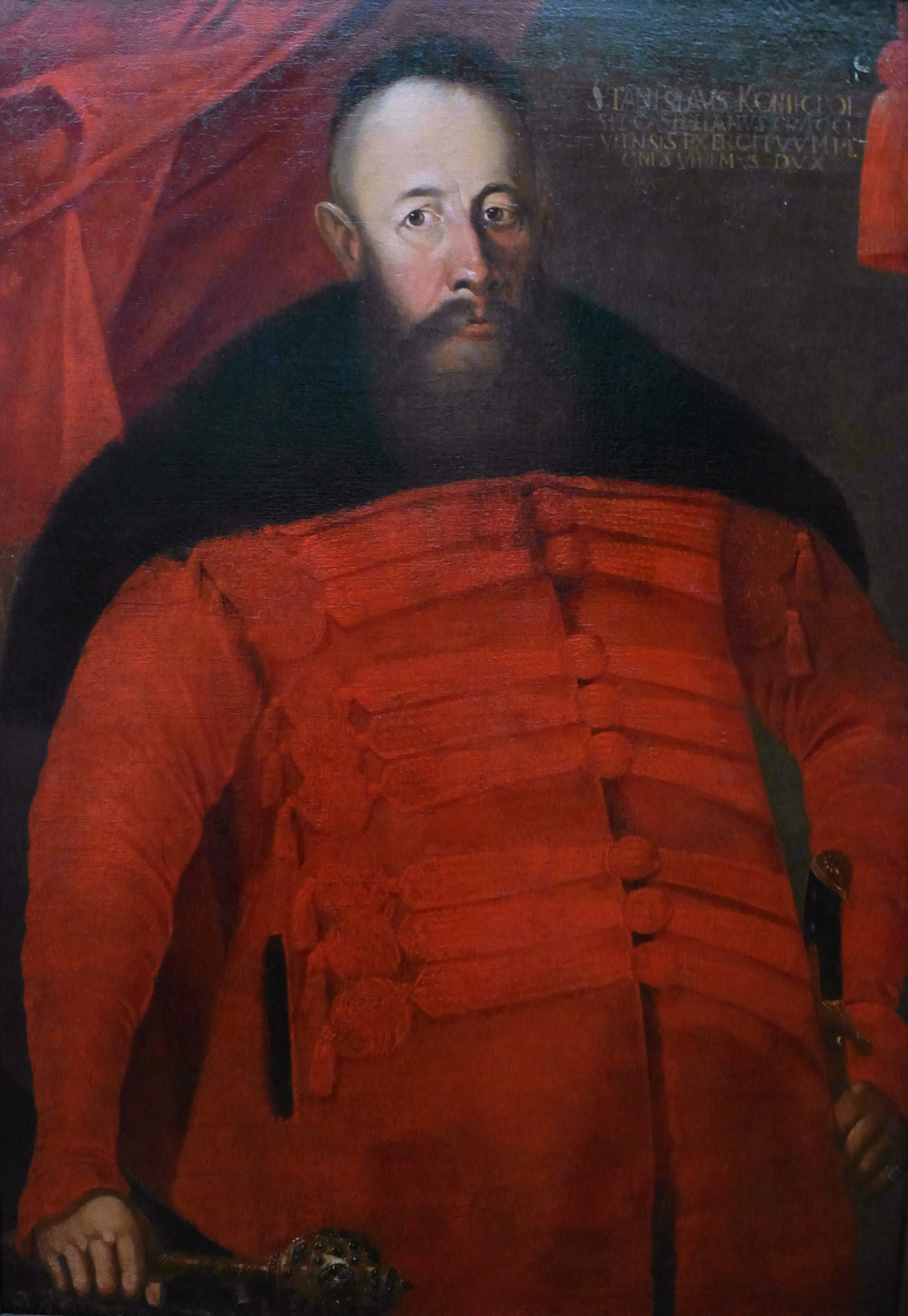
Stanisław Koniecpolski

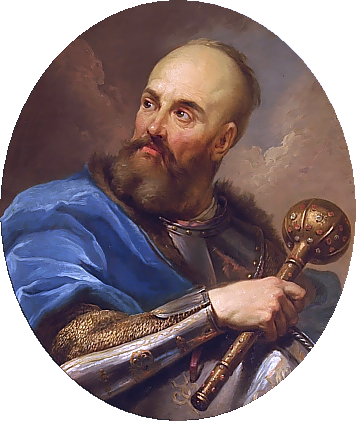
Stanisław Rewera Potocki

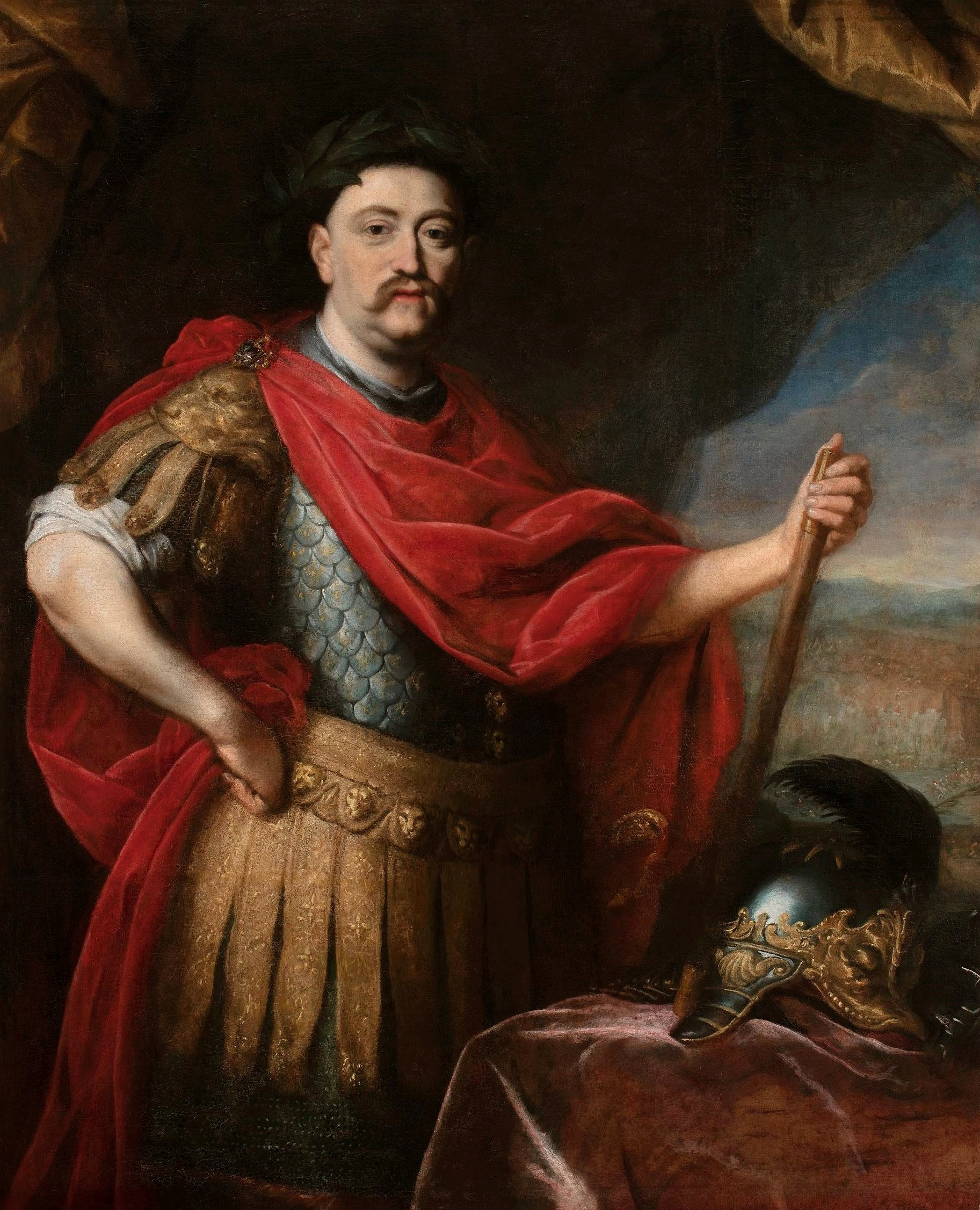
John III Sobieski

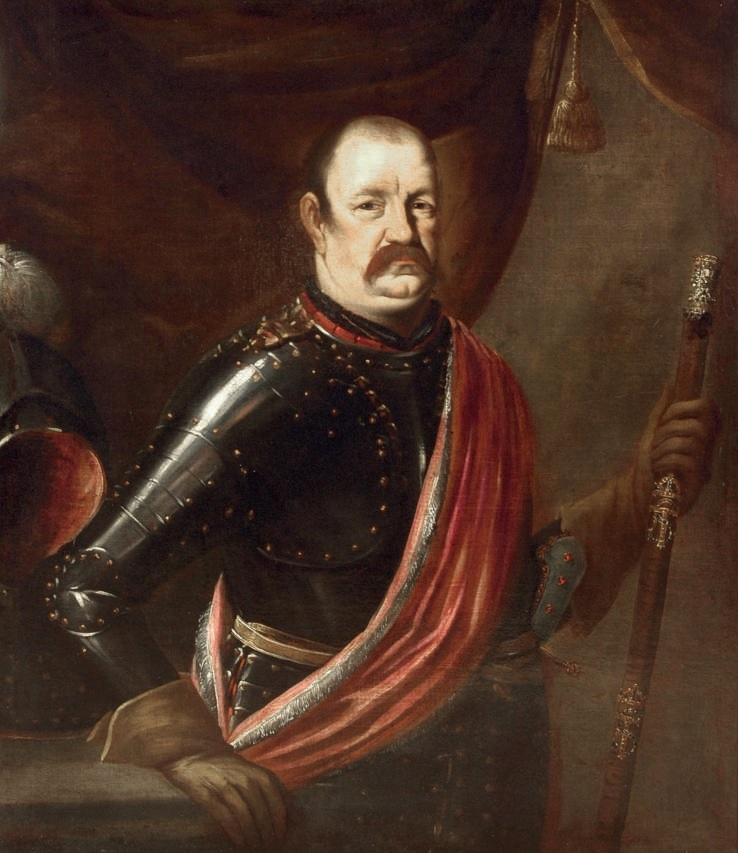
Jerzy Sebastian Lubomirski

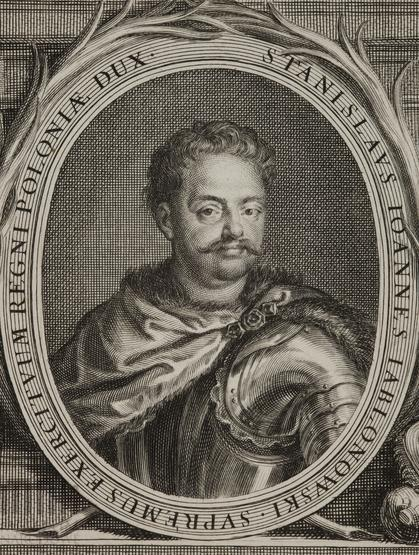
Stanisław Jabłonowski

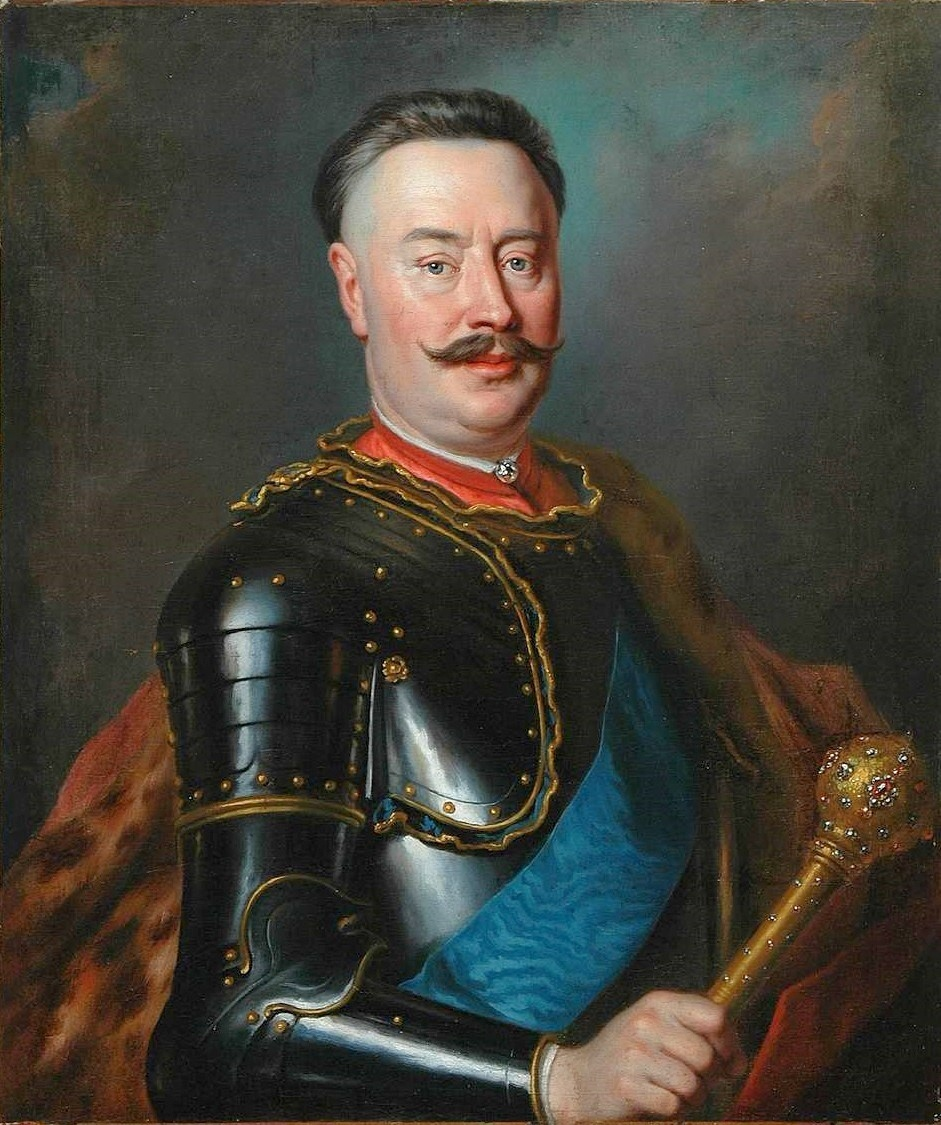
Jan Klemens Branicki

Hetmans of the Polish–Lithuanian Commonwealth (Belarusian: гетман; Lithuanian: etmonas; Ukrainian: гетьман) were the highest-ranking military officers, second only to the King, in the Polish–Lithuanian Commonwealth. The first Polish title of Grand Crown Hetman was created in 1505. The title of hetman was given to the leader of the Polish Army and until 1581, it was awarded only for a specific campaign or war. Later, it became a permanent title, as did all the titles in the Kingdom of Poland and Polish–Lithuanian Commonwealth. It could not be revoked unless treachery had been proven (from 1585). Hetmans were not paid for their services by the Royal Treasury.

== Field and Great Hetmans ==
From the end of the 16th century, there were two hetmans in the Grand Duchy of Lithuania and two hetmans in the Crown: a Field Hetman and a Great Hetman (sometimes translated as Grand Hetman). As a result, there were in total four hetman titles: Great Crown Hetman, Field Crown Hetman, Great Lithuanian Hetman and Field Lithuanian Hetman. During joint military operations of the Crown and Grand Duchy of Lithuania armies, the Grand Crown Hetman was usually considered superior to other hetmans and served as commander-in-chief if the war actions ran along the borders of the Grand Duchy and vice versa.

Grand Hetmans were usually in command of the professional and mobilised army and during peace stayed at the capital, involving themselves in politics, guarding the interests of the army and planning campaigns.

Polish Field Hetman was a subordinate of Grand Hetman and when on the same battlefield commanded the mercenaries and artillery. During peace, they usually were deployed on the eastern and southern borders of the Commonwealth, and commanded all local forces against constant skirmishes and small invasions of the Ottoman Empire and its vassals. Field Hetman were also called Frontier Hetman, since they did the same job as commanders of frontier garrisons before the title of hetman was introduced.

Lithuanian Field Hetman initially was called Court Hetman and commanded the guard of the Grand Duke, while Land Hetman commanded the militia. Later, this difference disappeared and they were renamed Field and Great Hetmans accordingly. Contrary to Polish practice, the Lithuanian Field Hetman had full control of the army under his command and wasn't subordinated to the Great Hetman.

For a short period, there was also an office of Royal Court Hetman, but it never gained much influence.

== Responsibilities and privileges ==
Hetman's competences and privileges, first officially described in 1527 in the act of nomination for Jan Tarnowski, included:

- planning and carrying out military campaigns;
- enlistment and organisation of professional army (wojsko kwarciane) and mercenaries;
- supervision of registered Cossacks and atamans, who were chosen by hetmans for two-year terms;
- nomination and promotion of officers at will;
- choosing locations where the army units were to draw supplies from (that could become a severe burden of cities/nobles that were disliked by a hetman);
- supervising the flow of the army's finances (including the soldiers' wages);
- full control over military judiciary (with capital punishment during wars), they could also issue laws and regulations for the army (known as hetman's articles);
- hearing complaints of all civilian personnel against the army and issuing compensation;
- hetmans had certain competencies in foreign policy, they could send their own emissaries to countries such as the Ottoman Empire, Moldavia, Crimean Khanate and Wallachia. It was reasoned that the distance to the capital was too large and the situation in those regions was always too volatile for all decisions to be made in the capital (Kraków, later Warsaw).

The hetman had no right to order the forces of the royal court, the royal guard, units equipped by the cities and towns, or private individuals, although during wars those units often voluntarily pledged their obedience to hetmans. Hetmans had no control over the navy, although the Polish Navy was always of very limited importance. Hetmans usually had no direct control over the levy (pospolite ruszenie), but they could give orders to the regimentars who commanded it.

While hetmans were considered to be among the highest-ranking officials in the Polish–Lithuanian Commonwealth, their hetman status gave them no right to sit in either the Senate or Sejm, unless they held another office that automatically carried with it a seat or were elected as a representatives of local szlachta during sejmiks. Each hetman received a hetman's ceremonial mace, the bulawa, as the symbol of his position (it was added to his coat of arms). Less common were a horse-tail ensign and hetman's sign.

In some of the never realised plans of reconstruction of the Polish–Lithuanian Commonwealth from dual into triple state (Polish–Lithuanian–Ruthenian Commonwealth), the hetman was to be the head of the Ruthenian part, consisting of three Ukrainian voivodeships (see Treaty of Hadiach).

The reforms of 1776, stimulated by the first Partition of Poland, limited the powers of the hetmans.

== Hetman's aides ==
A hetman's chief aides and officers included:

- pisarz polny – field chancellor, responsible for the archives, chancery, finances, accounting of people, equipment and fortifications, and paying soldiers' wages;
- strażnik – (lit.) guardian; security; supervised the scout forces during movement and camping and commanded the front guard (however, if both hetmans were present, the Field Hetman acted as Great Guardian; Polish: Wielki Strażnik);
- oboźny – camp leader; camp and transport organisation; responsible for choosing a suitable camping place for an army, setting up the camp, logistics and security inside the encampment;
- szpitalny – medic; medical services;
- profos – military judiciary;
- brabanmajster – logistics;
- regimentarz – second-in-command in the event a hetman was killed or taken prisoner; the regimantrz could also be chosen by the king for a given period when a hetman was not available, or informally assumed this function of the commander-in-chief when no hetman or monarch was present nearby (for example, the commander of a levee en masse was usually called a regimentarz.

Most of those aides also had a Field/Great and Crown/Lithuanian add-ons to their titles, depending on which hetman they were serving under.

Several new military titles were created after 1635 by King Władysław IV Vasa, changing some of the hetman's responsibilities:

- 1637 – General of Artillery (responsible for artillery forces, their logistics and such);
- 1670s – General of Logistics, General of Medics, General of Finances;
- the Generals of Inspections controlled the combat readiness of troops; it is unclear when they were created (besides the phrase "in the 17th century").

== List of Crown Hetmans ==
Great Crown Hetmans
From	To	
1485	1488	Feliks Paniewski
1488	1493	Stanisław Pieniążek z Witowic
1493	1497	vacant
1497	1499?	Jan Trnka z Raciborzan
1503	1515	Mikołaj Kamieniecki
1515	1526	Mikołaj Firlej
1526	1527	vacant
1527	1561	Jan Tarnowski
1561	1569	Mikołaj Sieniawski
1569	1575	Jerzy Jazłowiecki
1579	1580	Mikołaj Mielecki
1581	1605	Jan Zamoyski
1605	1613	vacant
1613	1620	Stanisław Żółkiewski
1620	1632	vacant
1632	1646	Stanisław Koniecpolski
1646	1651	Mikołaj Potocki
1651	1654	vacant
1654	1667	Stanisław "Rewera" Potocki
1668	1674	Jan Sobieski
1674	1676	vacant
1676	1682	Dymitr Jerzy Wiśniowiecki
1682	1683	vacant
1683	1702	Stanisław Jan Jabłonowski
1702	1702	Feliks Kazimierz Potocki
1702	1706	Hieronim Augustyn Lubomirski
1706	1726	Adam Mikołaj Sieniawski
1726	1728	Stanisław Mateusz Rzewuski
1728	1735	vacant
1735	1751	Józef Potocki
1751	1752	vacant
1752	1771	Jan Klemens Branicki
1773	1773	Wacław Rzewuski
1774	1793	Franciszek Ksawery Branicki
1793	1794	Piotr Ożarowski

Field Crown Hetmans
From	To	
1492	1499	Stanisław Chodecki z Chodcza
1499	1501	Piotr Myszkowski
1501	1505	Stanisław Chodecki z Chodcza
1505	1509	Jan Kamieniecki
1509	1520	Jan Tworowski
1520	1528	Marcin Kamieniecki
1529	1539	Jan Koła
1539	1561	Mikołaj Sieniawski
1561	1569	vacant
1569	1575	Jerzy Jazłowiecki
1575	1584	Mikołaj Sieniawski
1584	1588	vacant
1588	1613	Stanisław Żółkiewski
1613	1618	vacant
1618	1632	Stanisław Koniecpolski
1632	1633	vacant
1633	1636	Marcin Kazanowski
1636	1637	vacant
1637	1646	Mikołaj Potocki
1646	1652	Marcin Kalinowski
1652	1654	Stanisław "Rewera" Potocki
1654	1657	Stanisław Lanckoroński
1657	1664	Jerzy Sebastian Lubomirski
1664	1665	Stefan Czarniecki
1665	1666	vacant
1666	1667	Jan Sobieski
1667	1676	Dymitr Jerzy Wiśniowiecki
1682	1683	Stanisław Jan Jabłonowski
1682	1683	Mikołaj Hieronim Sieniawski
1684	1691	Andrzej Potocki
1691	1692	vacant
1692	1702	Feliks Kazimierz Potocki
1702	1702	Hieronim Augustyn Lubomirski
1702	1706	Adam Mikołaj Sieniawski
1706	1726	Stanisław Mateusz Rzewuski
1726	1728	Stanisław Chomętowski
1728	1736	vacant
1736	1752	Jan Klemens Branicki
1752	1773	Wacław Rzewuski
1774	1774	Franciszek Ksawery Branicki
1774	1794	Seweryn Rzewuski

== List of Hetmans of the Grand Duchy of Lithuania ==
Lithuanian Grand Hetmans
From	To	Polish name	Lithuanian name
1494	1497	Piotr Janowicz Montygerdowic	Petras Jonaitis Mantigirdaitis
1497	1500	Konstanty Ostrogski	Konstantinas Ostrogiškis
1500	1501	Semen Jurewicz Holszański	Simonas Alšėniškis
1501	1502	Stanisław Janowicz Kieżgajło	Stanislovas Kęsgaila
1503	1507	Stanisław Piotrowicz Kiszka	Stanislovas Kiška
1507	1530	Konstanty Ostrogski	Konstantinas Ostrogiškis
1530	1531	vacat	
1531	1541	Jerzy Radziwiłł	Jurgis Radvilas
1541	1550	vacat	
1561	1565	Mikołaj "the Red" Radziwiłł	Mykolas Radvila Rudasis
1566	1572	Grzegorz Chodkiewicz	Grigalius Chodkevičius
1572	1577	vacat	
1577	1584	Mikołaj "the Red" Radziwiłł	Mykolas Radvila Rudasis
1584	1589	vacat	
1589	1603	Krzysztof "Piorun" Radziwiłł	Kristupas Radvila Perkūnas
1603	1605	vacat	
1605	1621	Jan Karol Chodkiewicz	Jonas Karolis Chodkevičius
1621	1625	vacat	
1625	1633	Lew Sapieha	Leonas Sapiega
1633	1635	vacat	
1635	1640	Krzysztof Radziwiłł	Kristupas Radvila
1640	1646	vacat	
1646	1654	Janusz Kiszka	Jonušas Kiška
1654	1655	Janusz Radziwiłł	Jonušas Radvila
1656	1665	Paweł Jan Sapieha	Povilas Jonas Sapiega
1665	1667	vacat	
1667	1682	Michał Kazimierz Pac	Mykolas Kazimieras Pacas
1683	1703	Kazimierz Jan Sapieha	Kazimieras Jonas Sapiega
1703	1707	Michał Serwacy Wiśniowiecki	Mykolas Servantieits Višnioveckis
1707	1708	Jan Kazimierz Sapieha	Kazimieras Jonas Sapiega
1708	1709	Jan Kazimierz Sapieha the Elder	Jonas Kazimieras Sapiega
1709	1709	Grzegorz Antoni Ogiński	Grigalius Antanas Oginskis
1709	1730	Ludwik Pociej	Liudvikas Konstantinas Pociejus
1730	1735	vacat	
1735	1744	Michał Serwacy Wiśniowiecki	Mykolas Servantieits Višnioveckis
1744	1762	Michał Kazimierz "Rybeńko" Radziwiłł	Mykolas Kazimieras Radvila Žuvelė
1762	1768	Michał Józef Massalski	Mykolas Juozapas Masalskis
1768	1793	Michał Kazimierz Ogiński	Mykolas Kazimieras Oginskis
1793	1794	Szymon Marcin Kossakowski	Simonas Martynas Kosakovskis

Lithuanian Field Hetmans
From	To	Polish name	Lithuanian name	Notes
1521	1531	Jerzy Radziwiłł	Jurgis Radvila	Court Hetman
1531	1536	vacat		
1536	1540?	Andrzej Niemirowicz	Andrius Nemirovičius	Court Hetman
1540	1561	vacat		
1561	1566	Grzegorz Chodkiewicz	Grigalius Chodkevičius	Court Hetman
1566	1567	vacat		
1567	1571	Roman Sanguszko	Romanas Sanguška	Court Hetman
1571	1572	vacat		
1572	1589	Krzysztof "Piorun" Radziwiłł	Kristupas Radvila Perkūnas	Court Hetman
1589	1601	vacat		
1601	1605	Jan Karol Chodkiewicz	Jonas Karolis Chodkevičius	generalis exercituum Lithuanicorum vicarius
1605	1615	vacat		
1615	1635	Krzysztof Radziwiłł	Kristupas Radvila	
1635	1646	Janusz Kiszka	Jonušas Kiška	
1646	1654	Janusz Radziwiłł	Jonušas Radvila	
1654	1662	Wincenty Gosiewski	Vincentas Gosevskis	
1562	1563	vacat		
1663	1667	Michał Kazimierz Pac	Mykolas Kazimieras Pacas	
1667	1668	Władysław Wołłowicz	Vladislovas Valavičius	
1668	1680	Michał Kazimierz Radziwiłł	Mykolas Kazimieras Radvila	
1681	1683	Kazimierz Jan Sapieha	Kazimieras Jonas Sapiega	
1683	1684	Jan Jacek Ogiński	Jonas Oginskis	
1684	1685	vacat		
1685	1701	Józef Bogusław Słuszka	Juozapas Boguslavas Sluška	
1701	1702	vacat		
1702	1703	Michał Serwacy Wiśniowiecki	Mykolas Servantietis Višnioveckis	
1703	1709	Grzegorz Antoni Ogiński	Grigalius Antanas Oginskis	
1707	1709	Michał Serwacy Wiśniowiecki	Mykolas Servantietis Višnioveckis	
1709	1709	Ludwik Pociej	Liudvikas Konstantinas Pociejus	
1709	1728	Stanisław Ernest Denhoff	Ernestas Denhofas	
1728	1735	vacat		
1735	1744	Michał Kazimierz "Rybeńko" Radziwiłł	Mykolas Kazimieras Radvila Žuvelė	
1744	1762	Michał Józef Massalski	Mykolas Juozapas Masalskis	
1762	1775	Aleksander Michał Sapieha	Aleksandras Mykolas Sapiega	
1775	1780	Józef Sosnowski	Juozapas Silvestras Sosnovskis	
1780	1791	Ludwik Tyszkiewicz	Liudvikas Skuminas Tiškevičius	
1791	1792	vacat		
1792	1793	Szymon Marcin Kossakowski	Simonas Martynas Kosakovskis	
1793	1794	Józef Zabiełło	Juozapas Zabiela	

== See also ==
- Buława
- Hetman's sign
- Hetmans of Ukrainian Cossacks
- List of szlachta
- Military exemptions
- Offices in the Polish–Lithuanian Commonwealth

== Bibliography ==
- Polskie tradycje wojskowe, Warszawa: Wydawnictwo Ministerstwa Obrony Narodowej, 1990. ISBN 8311076758
- Zdzisław Żygulski, Hetmani Rzeczypospolitej, Kraków 1994
- Poczet hetmanów Rzeczypospolitej. Hetmani koronni. Pod redakcją Mirosława Nagielskiego, Warszawa 2005
- Poczet hetmanów Rzeczypospolitej. Hetmani litewscy. Pod redakcją Mirosława Nagielskiego, Warszawa 2006
- Urzędnicy centralni i nadworni Polski XIV–XVIII wieku. Spisy, Wyd. PAN, Kórnik 1992
