= Piotr Myszkowski (hetman) =

Polish magnate and military commander

Piotr Myszkowski (c. 1450-1505) was a Polish magnate and military commander. He was the Crown Field Hetman (1499-1501), Voivode of Łęczyca (from 1501), Voivode of Bełz (from 1499), castellan of Oświęcim (1484-1489), Wieluń (1489-1494), Rozprza (1494-1497) and Nowy Sącz (from 1498).

In 1499, the king of Poland, Jan Olbracht, made him the commander of Obrona Potoczna ("General Defense"), a semi-regular force charged with protecting the southern border of the Polish–Lithuanian Commonwealth from Tatar raids.
