= Józef Bogusław Słuszka =

Polish–Lithuanian statesman and military officer (1652–1701)

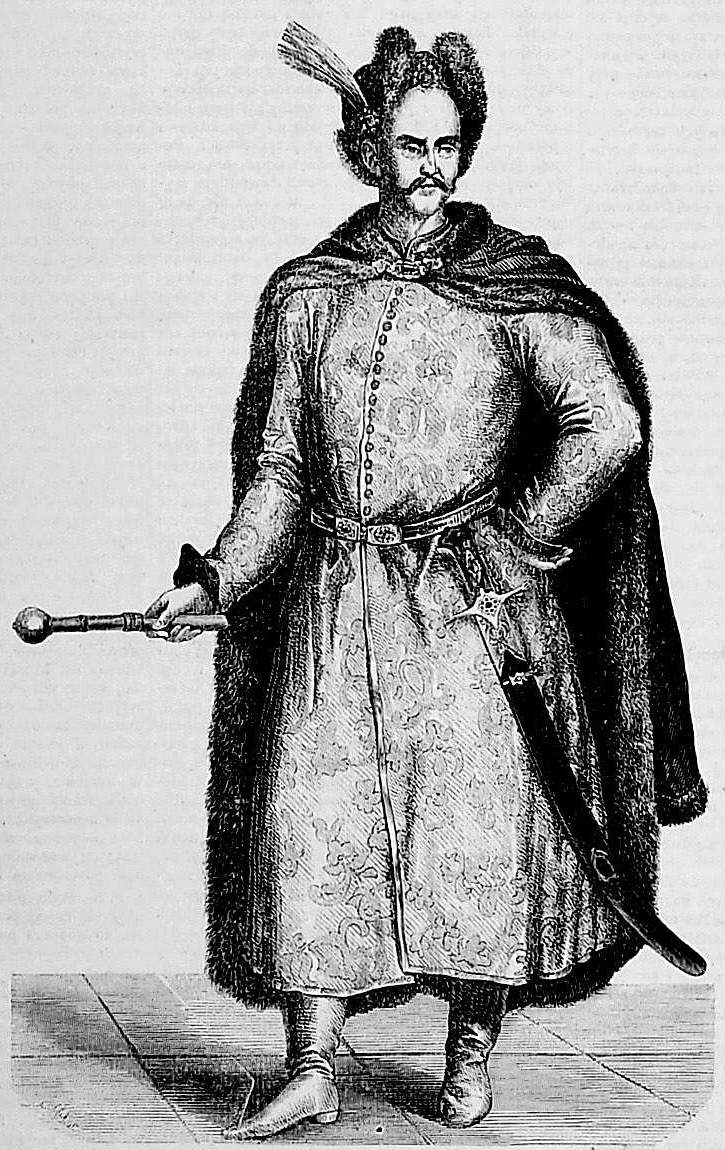
A posthumous portrait of Słuszka from the Tygodnik Ilustrowany, 1861

Józef Bogusław Słuszka (1652 – 8 October 1701) was a nobleman, statesman and commander of the Grand Duchy of Lithuania. He served as its hetman from 25 April 1685 to 1701 and also became castellan of Vilnius.

== Sources (in Polish) ==
- http://www.bilp.uw.edu.pl/ti/1861/foto/nn59.htm
- http://www.archive.org/stream/herbarzpolskipow08niesuoft/herbarzpolskipow08niesuoft_djvu.txt
