= Buława =

Ceremonial scepter

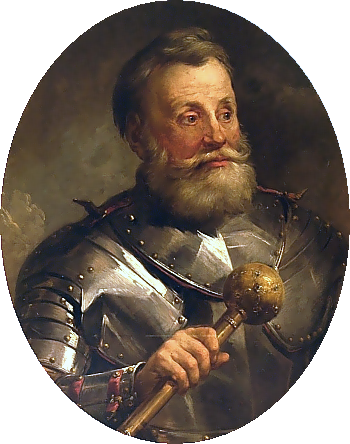
Hetman Chodkiewicz of Polish–Lithuanian Commonwealth, holding a buława

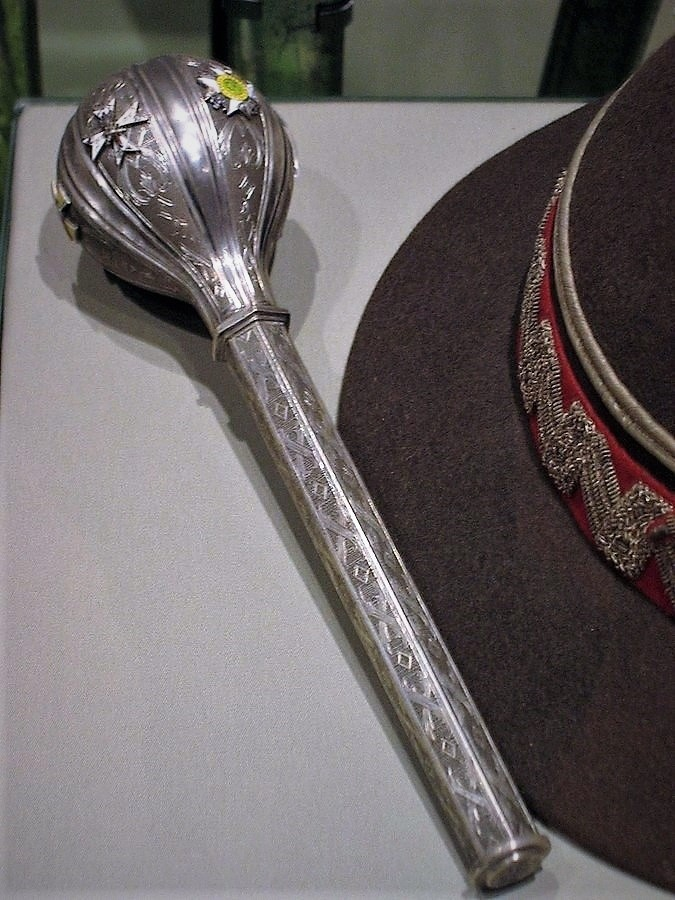
Buława of Polish Marshal Edward Rydz-Śmigły

The buława (Ukrainian: булава, romanized: bulavá) is a type of ceremonial mace used in the Polish–Lithuanian Commonwealth as a symbol of high military authority, primarily by hetmans but also by kings, who were the supreme commanders of the armed forces. The buława was the most important emblem of a hetman's power. However, it was also accompanied by a baton (known as a "regiment"), a buzdygan, and the so-called hetman’s sign.

The buława consisted of a solid head connected to a shaft. It was introduced to Poland from Hungary during the reign of Stephen Báthory.

== Polish–Lithuanian Commonwealth ==
The word buława entered both the Polish and Ruthenian languages from the Turkic nomads’ term for a mace, most likely through the Cumans, who had been in contact with the Slavs since the 11th century. The traditional symbol of military authority in Poland was the buzdygan, a type of mace with a flanged head. The buława appeared early, already in the 13th century, but it became a symbol of military authority much later, and established as such during the reign of Stephen Báthory, Prince of Transylvania, who was elected King of Poland in 1576. In Transylvania, the buława had been a symbol of vassal authority granted by the Ottoman sultans. Upon Báthory’s accession to the Polish throne, however, it took on a new meaning. That coincided with the formalization of the hetman’s office, which had existed since the mid-15th century but became a lifetime appointment only in 1581.

The word referred both to a weapon used in combat and to ornamental versions that served a purely decorative function and symbolized military authority. The term often denoted the hetman’s office itself, and people spoke of the "Great Buława" and the "Field Buława" to refer respectively to the offices of the Grand Hetman and the Field Hetman. Moreover, a verb derived from the word, buławić, was used as a synonym for "to command."

The buława was the primary emblem of a hetman's authority. However, there were no formal restrictions or limitations on its use. It was also wielded by regimentarz, commanders temporarily replacing hetmans, as well as by powerful magnates who commanded their own private armies. With the establishment of the office of the Hetman of the Zaporozhian Host, originally subordinate to the Grand Crown Hetman, he too was granted the right to use the buława. The custom persisted even after the Cossack hetmans gained independence from Poland.

== Ukraine ==
In the Ukrainian language, a булава (bulava) is a mace or club, in both the military and ceremonial senses. A bulava became one of the Ukrainian Cossack kleinody (Ukrainian: клейноди, lit. 'jewels'): Bohdan Khmelnytsky bore a gilt bulava adorned with pearls and gems in his role as Hetman of the Zaporizhian Host (in office: 1648 to 1657).

Historically, the bulava was an attribute of a hetman, an officer of the highest military rank, and of the Hetman or the military head of a Cossack state (Cossack Hetmanate).

The Ukrainian People's Republic of 1917-1920 referred to the General Staff of the Ukrainian People's Army as the "General Bulava".

A ceremonial bulava is now an official emblem of the president of Ukraine, and is housed in Ukraine's Vernadsky National Library.

Ukrainian military heraldry often features bulava-images, particularly as a part of rank insignia for generals and admirals, as well as an element of the insignia of the Ministry of Defence and of the National Security and Defence Council.

== Gallery ==
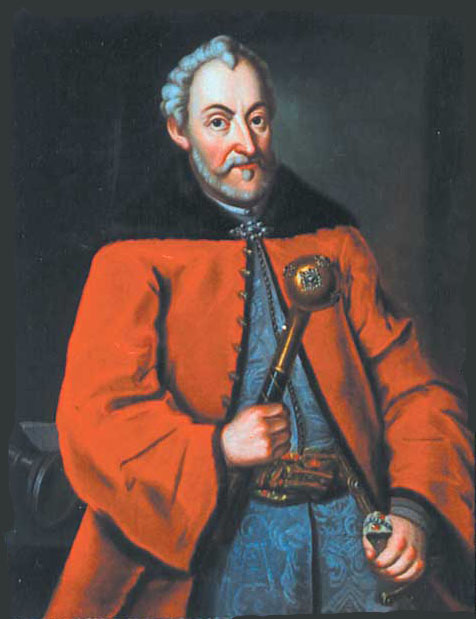
Hetman Zamoyski, in crimson delia and blue żupan, holding hetman's buława

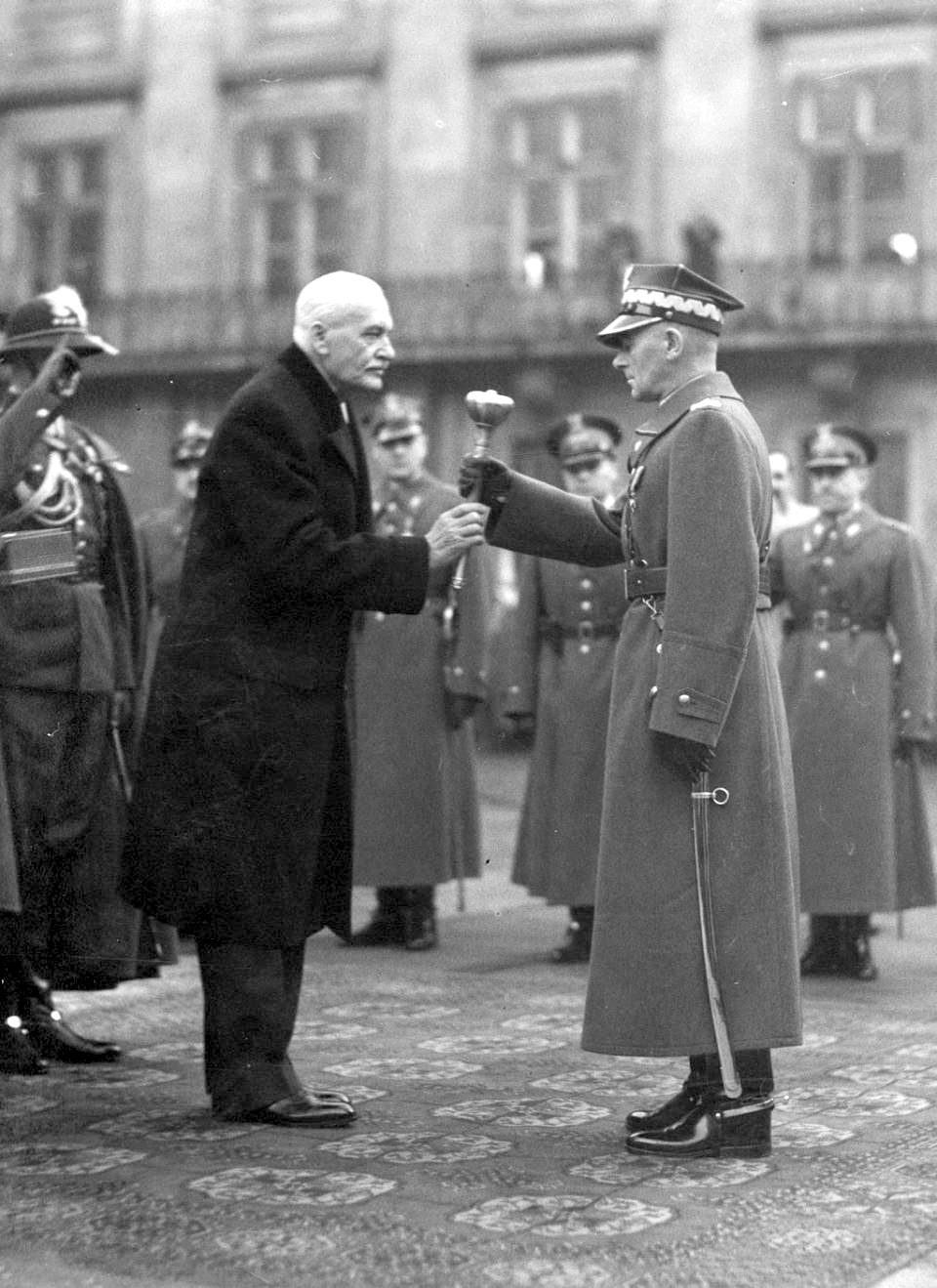
Edward Rydz-Śmigły (right) receiving marshal's buława from Polish President Ignacy Mościcki, Warsaw, 10 November 1936

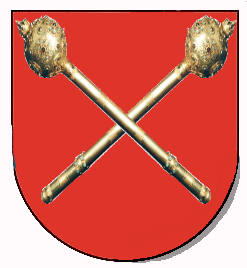
Coat-of-arms (two crossed buławas) of a Polish hetman

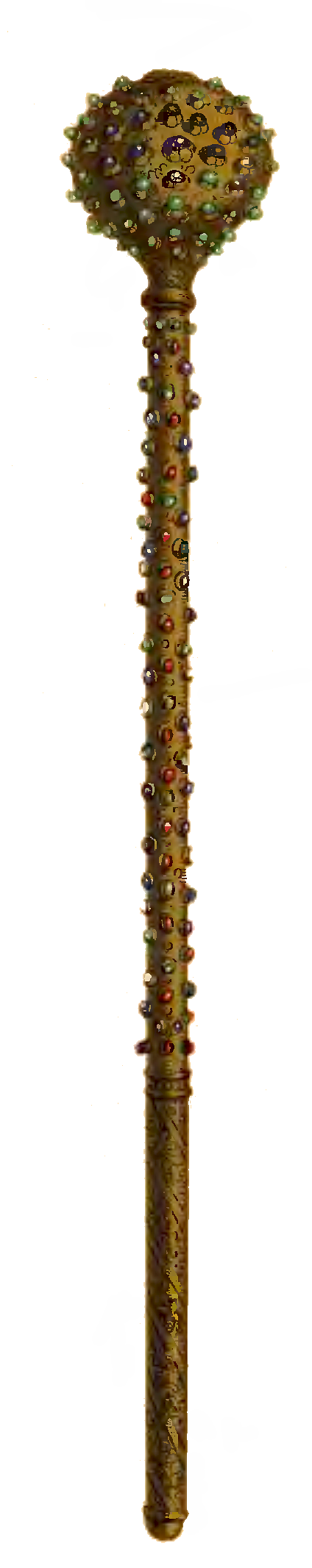
Buława of Crown Field Hetman Kalinowski

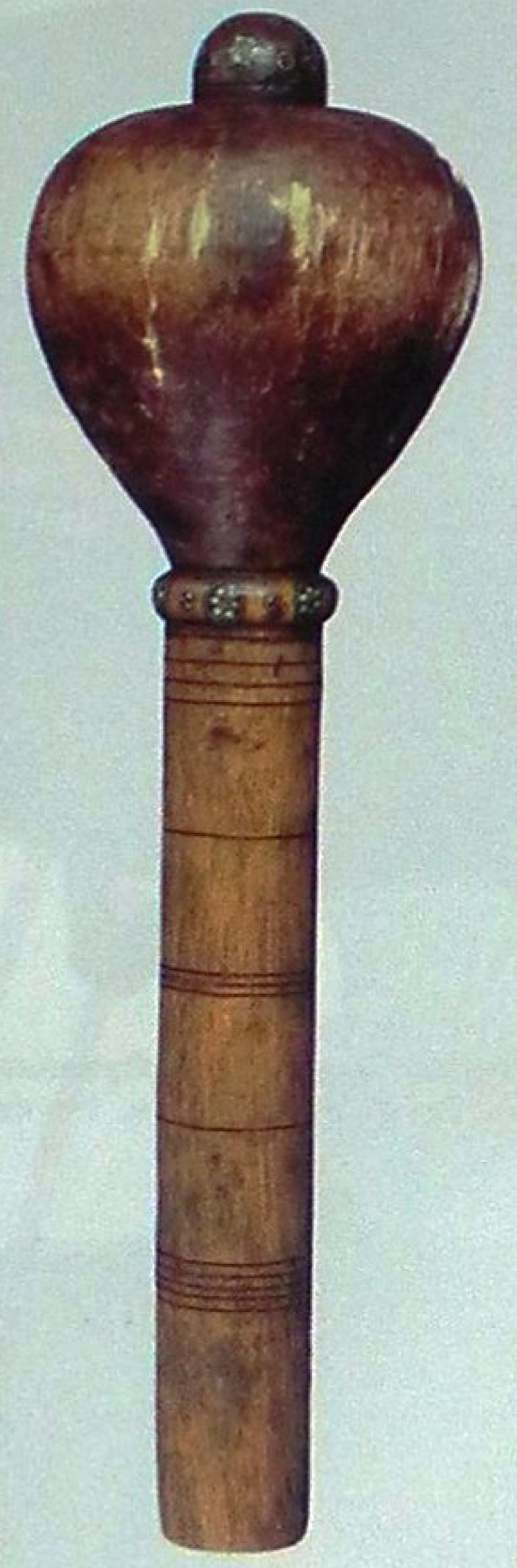
Bulava of Hetman of Ukraine Bohdan Khmelnytsky, 17th century

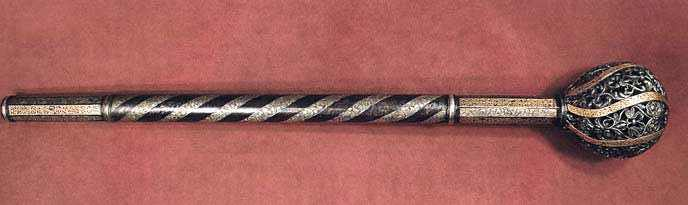
Bulava of Hetman of Ukraine in exile Pylyp Orlyk, 18th century

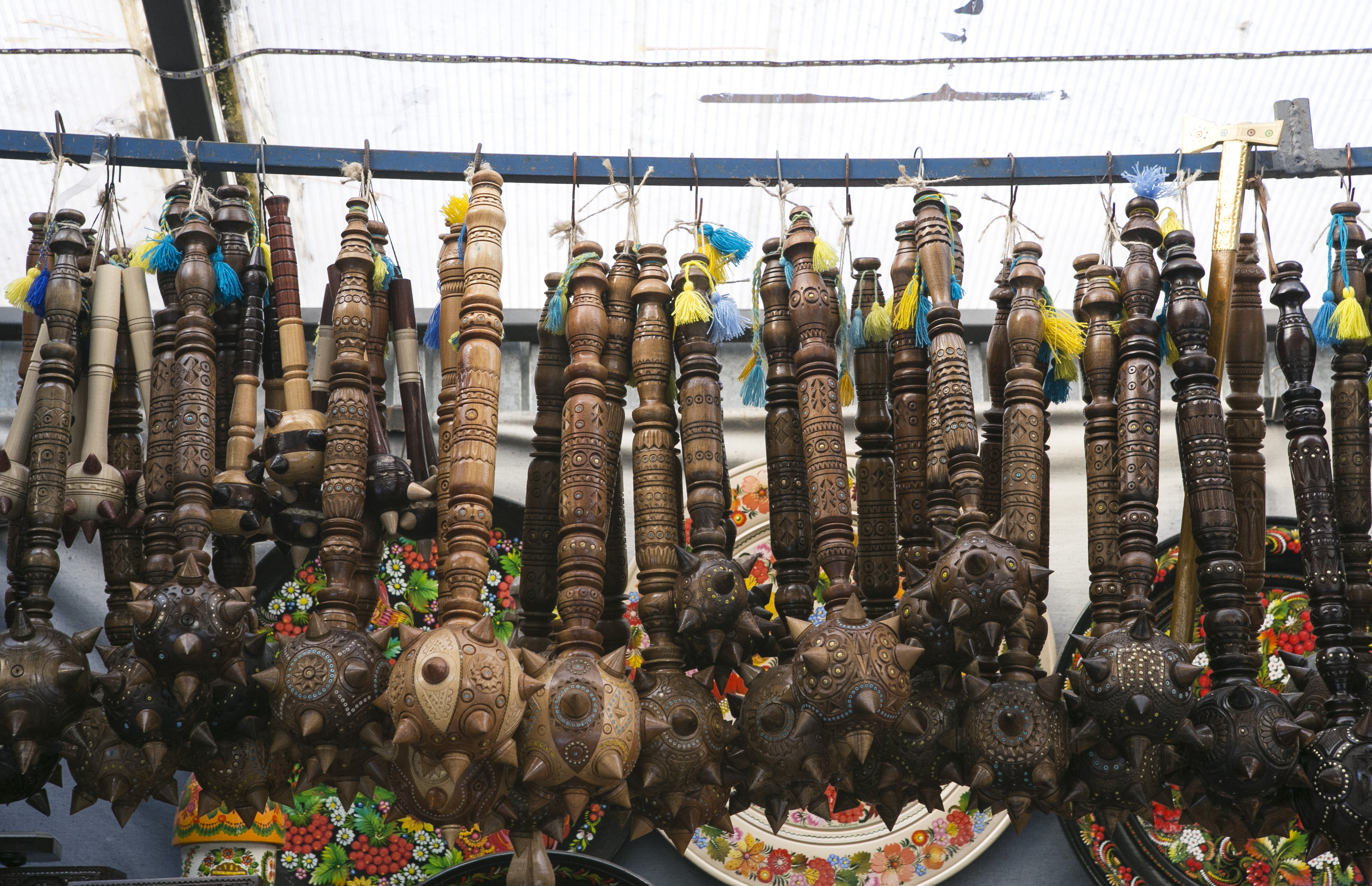
Toy bulavas in a Kyiv market

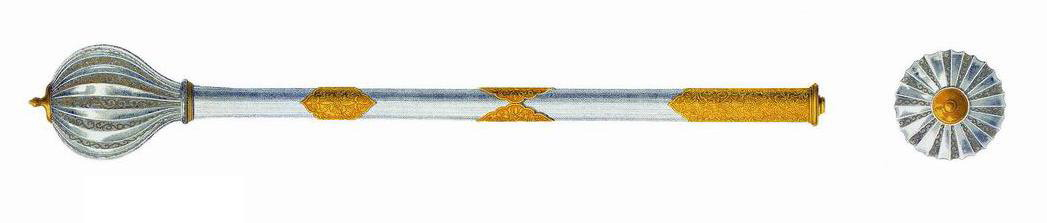
17th-century Russian bulat steel bulava

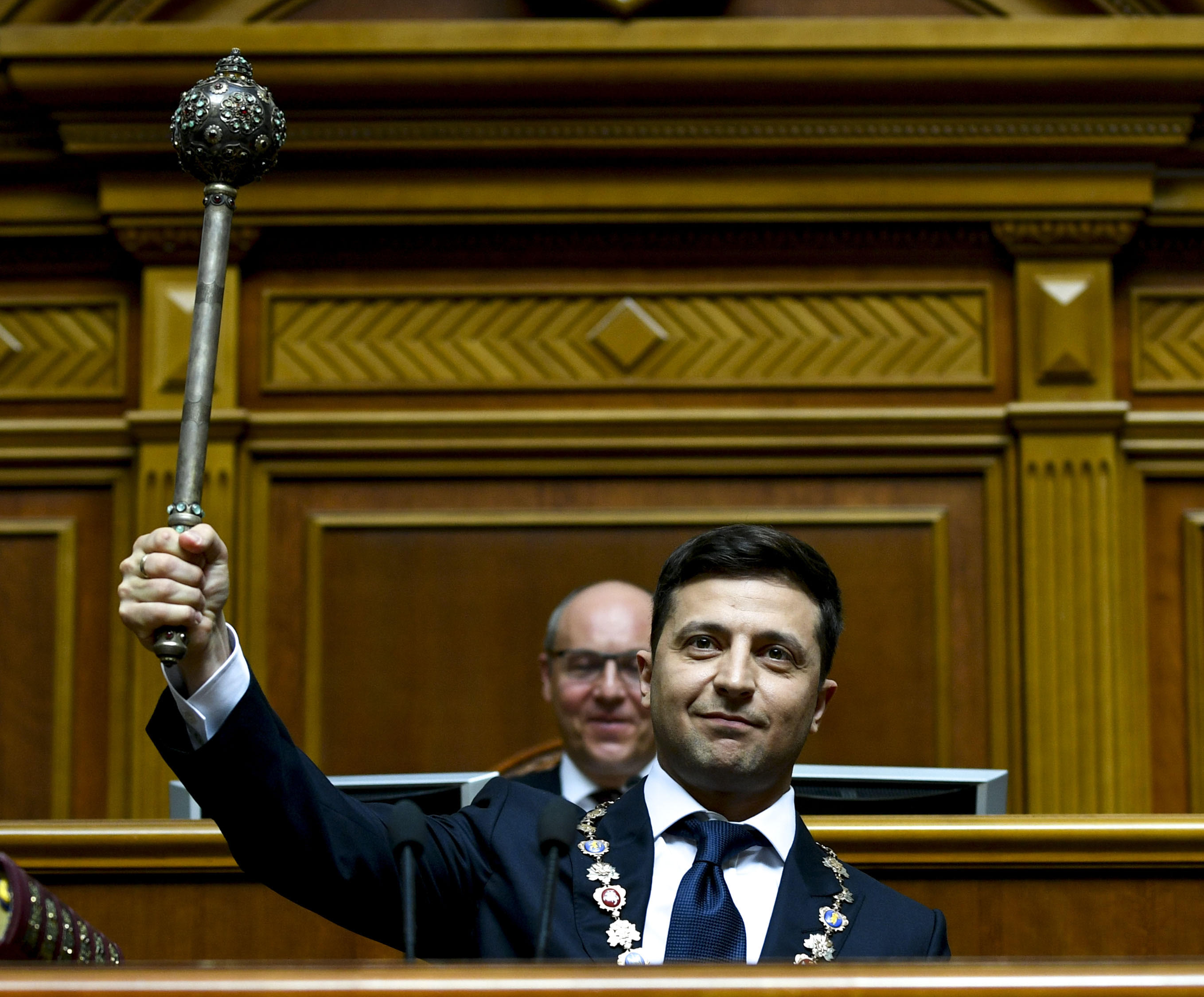
Volodymyr Zelenskyy lifting presidential bulava during the 2019 presidential inauguration of Ukraine

== See also ==
- Baton (military)
- Pernach
- Polish heraldry
- RSM-56 Bulava
- Sengol

== Sources ==
- Łopatecki, Karol (2005). "Znak hetmański. Geneza, funkcje, symbolika" (PDF). Studia i Materiały do Historii Wojskowości. 42.
- Żygulski, Zdzisław (1999). Światła Stambułu. Warsaw.
