= Hetman's sign =

Military symbol employed in the Polish-Lithuanian Commonwealth

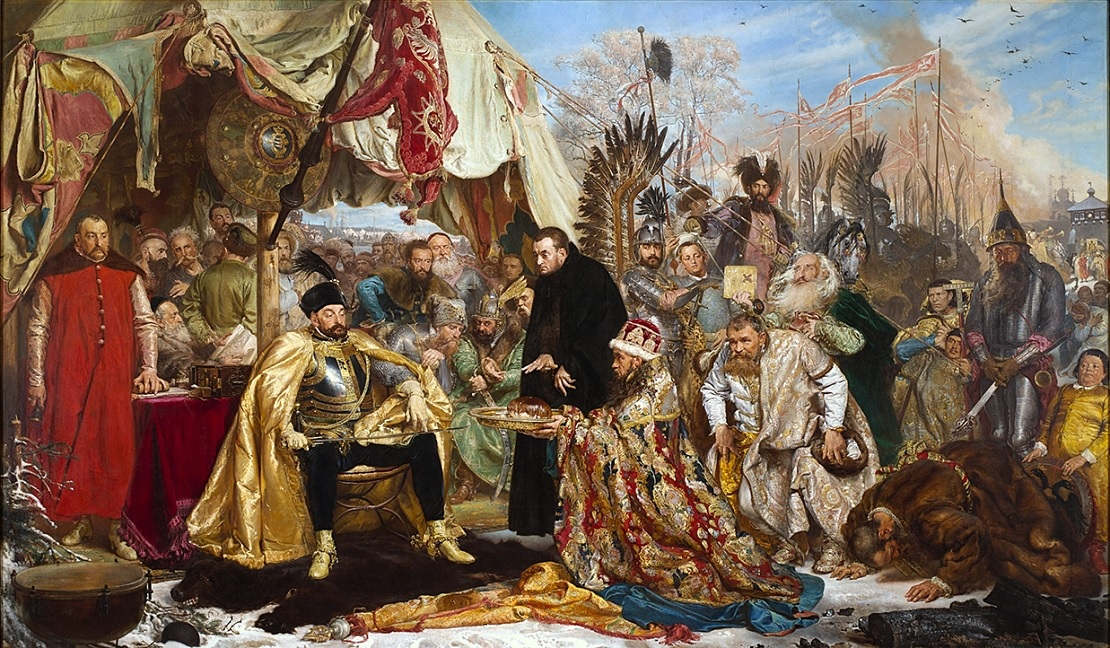

The hetman's sign (Polish: znak hetmański) was the only native military symbol of the Polish–Lithuanian Commonwealth. It was invented by hetman Jan Tarnowski, who also popularized it on the territory of Poland in the second half of the sixteenth century. In Lithuania the hetman's sign was accepted in the following century. It became the most popular under reign of king Jan III Sobieski. Although he received the crown, he didn't reject his former attribute of authority. However, from the mid of the eighteenth century hetman's sign was replaced by horse-tail ensign.

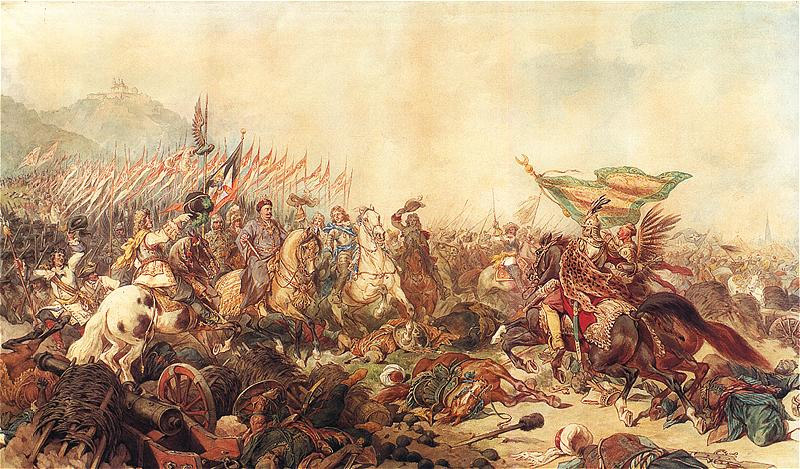

The hetman's sign was a composition of various objects. These compositions underwent various changes. However, there was always a spear with a ball or a spear-head on its end. Sometimes there were feathers attached to the spear. If there were, they usually were fastened together in a shape of a wing with a buckle. Sometimes there were also colourful ribbons or a horse-tail ensign attached to the top of the spearshaft and during the battle so called "hetman's cap" was joined to it. This symbol was attributed only to a hetman. When a hetman was riding a horse, the hetman's sign was carried by a horseman behind him. This sign was to emphasize the dominating role of hetman as a commander-in-chief of an army and to manifest the features of an ideal hetman. It fulfilled the important utilitarian role at a battlefield. It informed the soldiers where the hetman was and assured them of his constant presence at the battlefield.

== See also ==
- Buława
- Hetman
- Offices in Polish–Lithuanian Commonwealth
