= Władysław Wołłowicz =

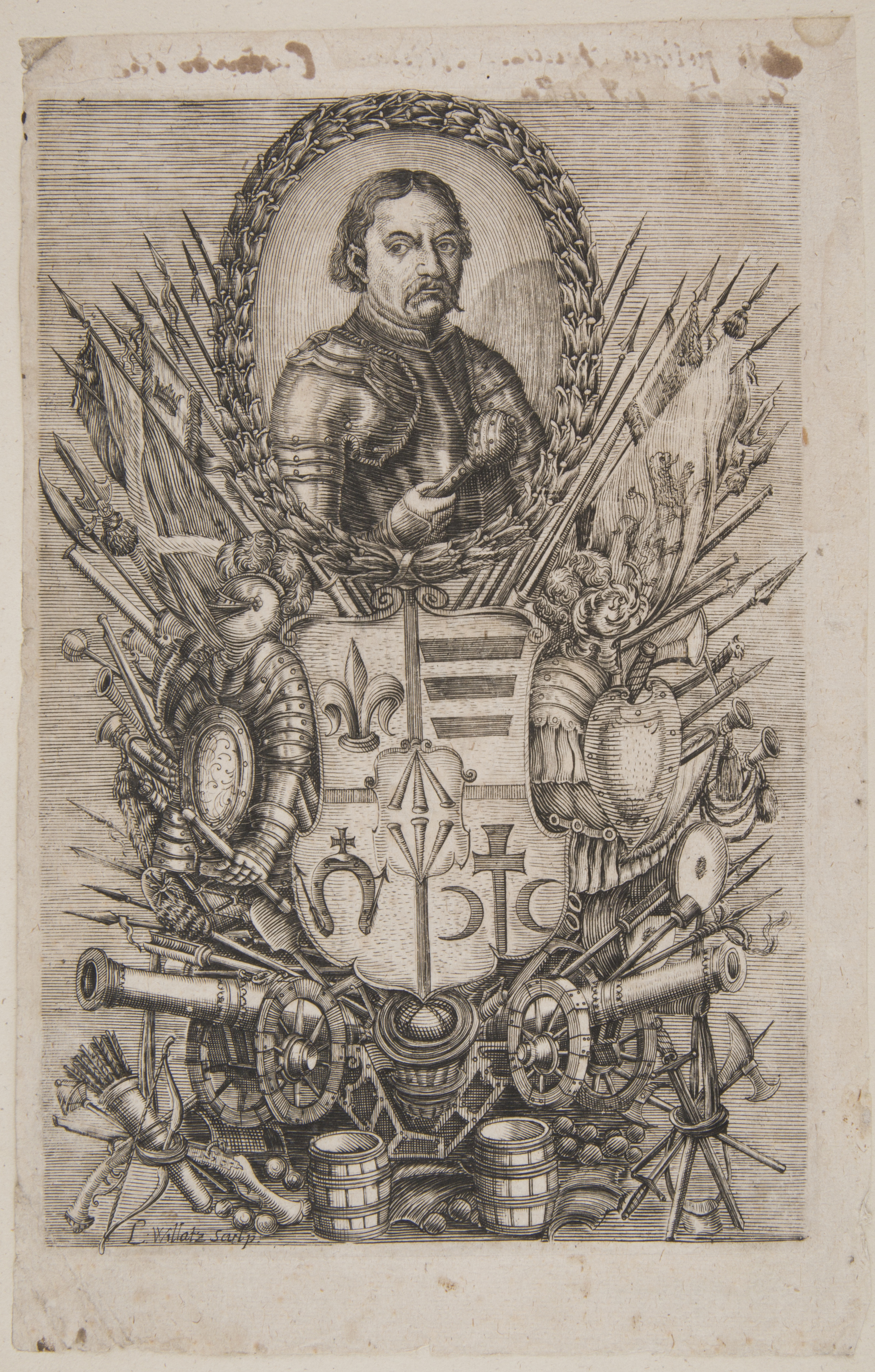
Portrait (1669)

Władysław Wołłowicz (Lithuanian: Vladislovas Valavičius) (1615 – 14 September 1668, Vilnius) was a nobleman, commander and statesman of the Grand Duchy of Lithuania.

== Life ==
He took part in the Smolensk War and in 1634 was briefly held prisoner by the Russians. In 1639 he became secretary to the hetman of Lithuania - he was also later Royal Secretary. From 1648 to 1650 he took part in suppressing the Khmelnytsky Uprising. During the Swedish invasion he accompanied John II Casimir Vasa to Silesia and he became the only Lithuanian official to sign the Łańcut Confederation. In 1653 he became castellan of Smolensk and in 1656 voivode of Vitebsk.

In 1658 he took part in the Russo-Polish War, in which he and Nicholas Judyckim suffered a crushing defeat at Miadel on 8 February 1659. In 1667 he became hetman of Lithuania. After John II Casimir's abdication in 1668 he supported tsarevich Feodor (the future Feodor III of Russia) as candidate to be king of Poland.

== Sources ==
- Wacław Uruszczak, Fakcje senatorskie w sierpniu 1668 roku, w: Parlament, prawo, ludzie, studia ofiarowane profesorowi Juliuszowi Bardachowi w sześćiesięciolecie pracy twórczej, Warszawa 1996, s. 315.
