= Hetman =

Historical political and military title in Central and Eastern Europe

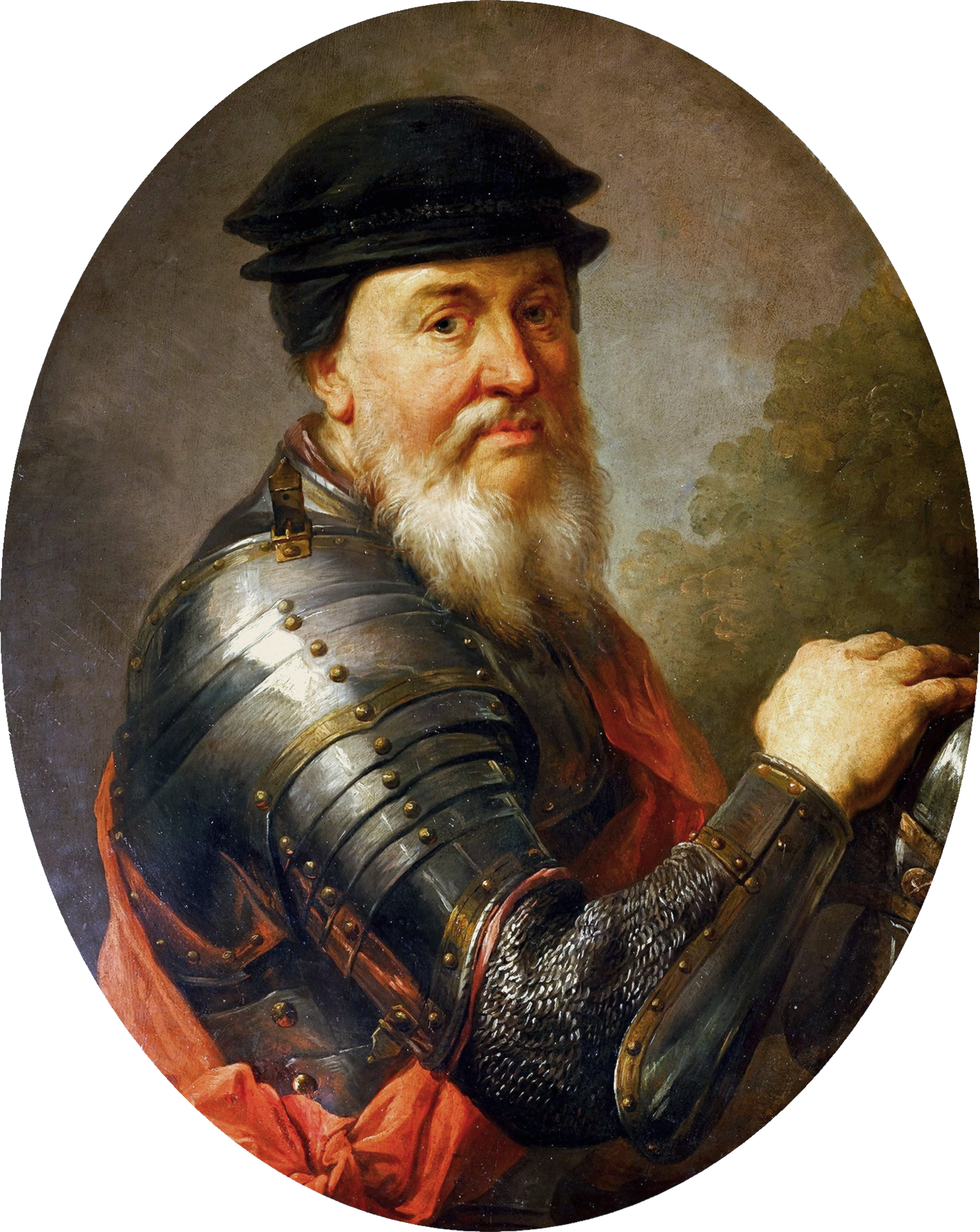
Grand Crown Hetman Jan Amor Tarnowski by Marcello Bacciarelli, 1781

Hetman is a political title from Central and Eastern Europe, historically assigned to military commanders (comparable to a field marshal or imperial marshal in the Holy Roman Empire). First used by the Czechs in Bohemia in the 15th century, it was the title of the second-highest military commander after the king in the Crown of the Kingdom of Poland and the Grand Duchy of Lithuania from the 16th to 18th centuries. Hetman was also the title of the head of the Cossack state in Ukraine after the Khmelnytsky Uprising of 1648. Throughout much of the history of Romania and Moldavia, hetmans were the second-highest army rank. In the modern Czech Republic, the title is used for regional governors.

== Etymology ==
The Polish spelling hetman comes from the Old Czech hajtman, most likely composed of the German roots Haupt (head) and Mann (man). In modern Czech, the original spelling is continued as hejtman.

== Hetmans of Poland and Lithuania ==
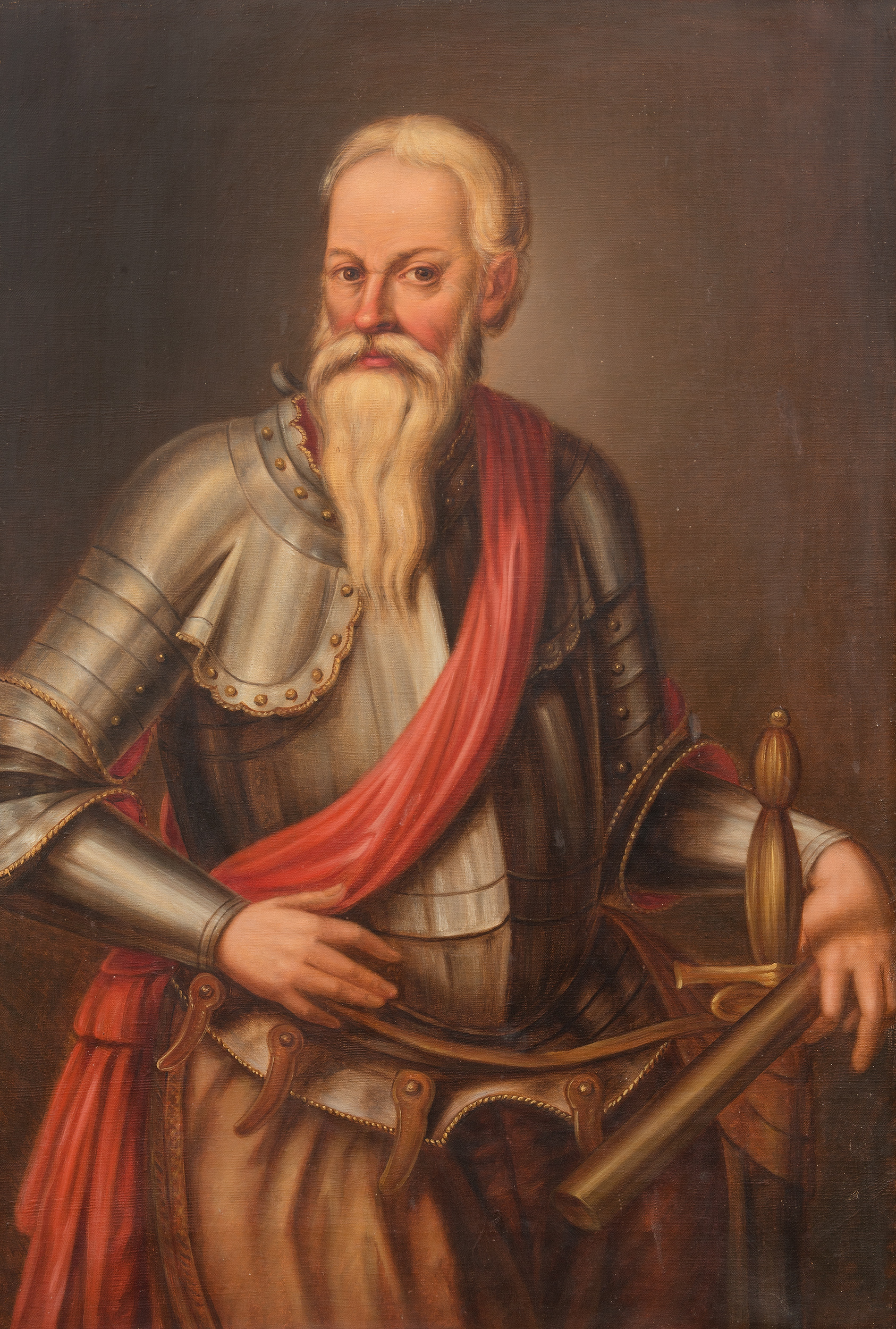
Hetman Mikołaj "the Red" Radziwiłł

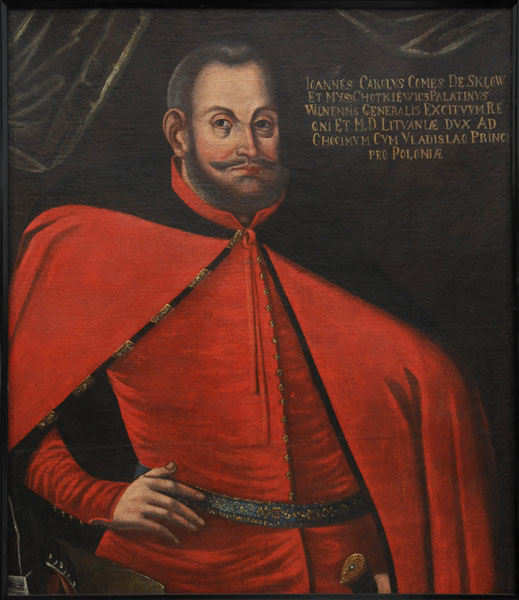
Hetman Jan Karol Chodkiewicz wearing a traditional costume of Polish magnates

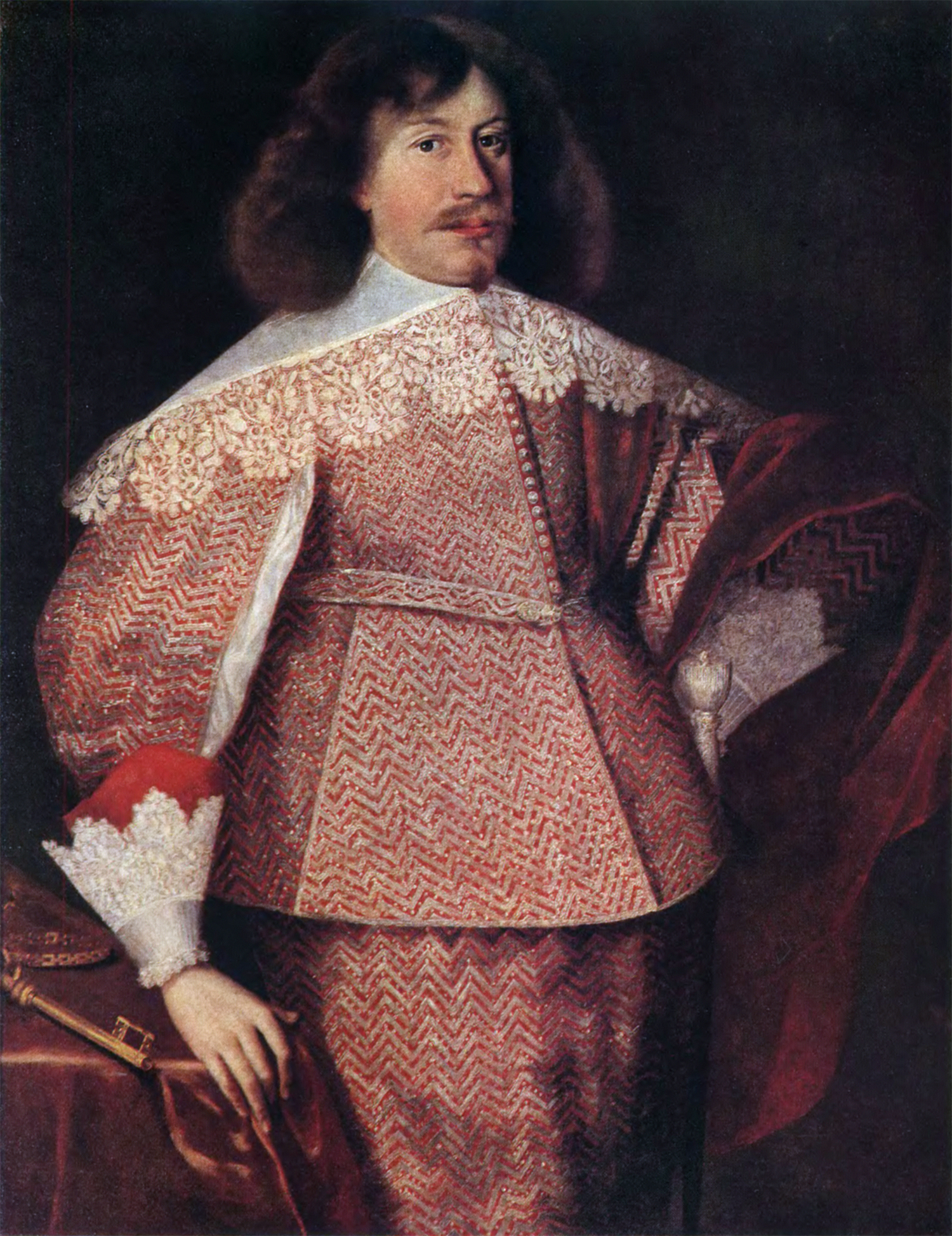
Janusz Radziwiłł, one of the most powerful people in the Commonwealth at the time

The Polish title Grand Crown Hetman (Polish: hetman wielki koronny) dates from 1505. The title of Hetman was given to the leader of the Polish Army. Until 1581 the hetman position existed only during specific campaigns and wars. After that, it became a permanent title, as were all the titles in the Crown of the Kingdom of Poland and the Polish–Lithuanian Commonwealth. At any given time the Commonwealth had four hetmans – a Great Hetman and Field (deputy) Hetman each for both Poland and Lithuania.

From 1585, the title could not be taken away without a proven charge of treachery, so most hetmans served for life. Jan Karol Chodkiewicz literally commanded the army from his deathbed (1621). Hetmans were not paid by the royal treasury. Hetmans were the main commanders of the military forces, second only to the monarch in the army's chain of command. The fact that they could not be removed by the monarch made them very independent, and thus often able to pursue independent policies.

This system worked well when a hetman had great ability and the monarch was weak, but sometimes produced disastrous results in the opposite case. The security of the position notably contrasted with that of military leaders in states bordering the commonwealth, where sovereigns could dismiss their army commanders at any time. In 1648 the Zaporizhian Host (then a Polish–Lithuanian Commonwealth subject) elected a hetman of its own, Bohdan Khmelnytsky, igniting the Ukrainian struggle for independence.

The military reform of 1776 curtailed the powers of the hetmans. The Hetman office was abolished after the Third Partition of Poland (1795).

== Hetmans of the Cossack Hetmanate ==
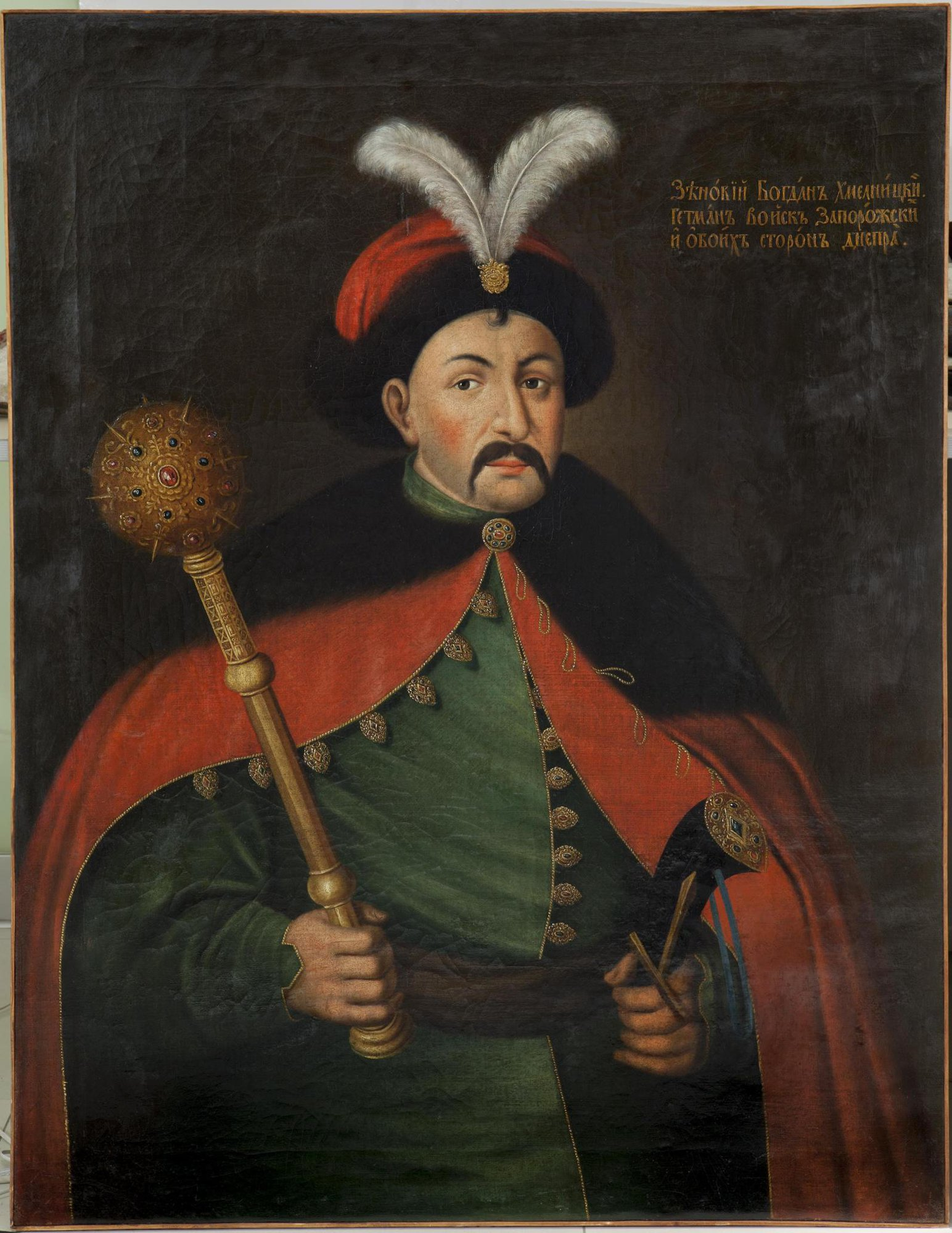
Ukrainian Hetman Bohdan Zinoviy Khmelnytsky

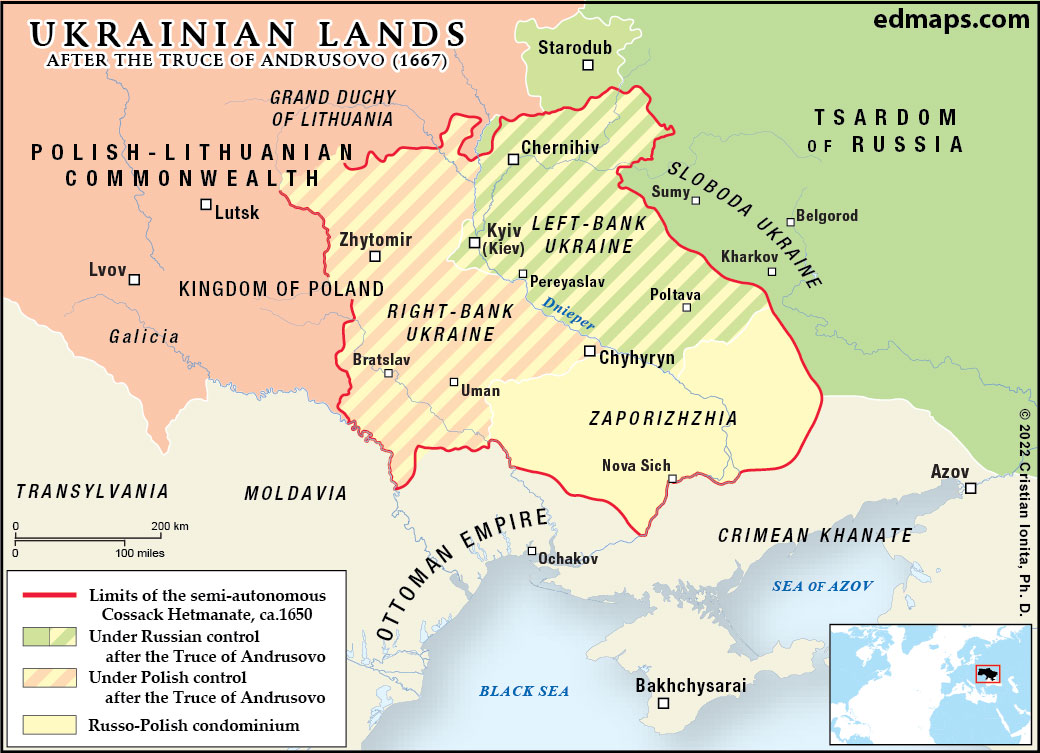
In 1667, the Russo-Polish war ended with the Treaty of Andrusovo, which split the Cossack Hetmanate along the Dnieper River: Left-bank Ukraine to the Tsardom of Russia, while Right-bank Ukraine remained part of the Polish–Lithuanian Commonwealth

At the end of the sixteenth century, the commanders of the Zaporizhian Cossacks were titled Koshovyi Otaman or Hetman; Christof Kosynsky was the first Zaporizhian hetman. In 1572, a hetman was a commander of the Registered Cossack Army (Ukrainian: Реєстрове козацьке військо) of the Commonwealth. From 1648, the start of Bohdan Khmelnytsky's uprising, a hetman was the head of the whole Ukrainian State — Hetmanshchyna and heads of the Cossack Hetmanate. As supreme military commanders and lawmakers (by administrative decree), they had very broad powers, although they were elected.

After the split of Ukraine along the Dnieper River by the 1667 Polish–Russian Treaty of Andrusovo, Ukrainian Cossacks (and Cossack hetmans) became known as Left-bank Cossacks (of the Cossack Hetmanate) and Right-bank Cossacks.

In the Russian Empire, the office of Cossack Hetman was abolished by Catherine II of Russia in 1764. The last Hetman of the Zaporozhian Army (the formal title of the hetman of Ukraine) was Kyrylo Rozumovsky, who reigned from 1751 until 1764.

The title was revived in Ukraine during the revolution of 1917 to 1921. In early 1918, a conservative German-supported coup overthrew the radical socialist Ukrainian Central Rada and its Ukrainian People's Republic, establishing a hetmanate monarchy headed by Pavlo Skoropadskyi, who claimed the title Hetman of Ukraine. This regime lasted until late 1918, when it was overthrown by a new Directorate of Ukraine, of a re-established Ukrainian People's Republic.

== Hetmans of Bohemia, Romania, and Moldavia ==
Used by the Czechs in Bohemia from the Hussite Wars (15th century) onward, hejtman is today the term for the elected governor of a Czech region (kraj).

For much of the history of Romania and the Principality of Moldavia, hetmans were second in rank in the army, after the ruling prince, who held the position of voivode.

== Other uses ==
Hetman has often been used figuratively to mean 'commander' or simply 'leader'. Examples:

- "They say there was a whole band of them, and that this bearded man was their elder, the hetman." — Maxim Gorky, Mother (1906)

Queen (chess piece) is called hetman in Polish and coded as H in the algebraic notation.

== See also ==
- Acting hetman
- Ataman
- Bulawa
- Hetman's sign
