= 1433 =

1433 in various calendars
- Gregorian calendar: 1433; MCDXXXIII
- Ab urbe condita: 2186
- Armenian calendar: 882; ԹՎ ՊՁԲ
- Assyrian calendar: 6183
- Balinese saka calendar: 1354–1355
- Bengali calendar: 839–840
- Berber calendar: 2383
- English Regnal year: 11 Hen. 6 – 12 Hen. 6
- Buddhist calendar: 1977
- Burmese calendar: 795
- Byzantine calendar: 6941–6942
- Chinese calendar: 壬子年 (Water Rat); 4130 or 3923 — to — 癸丑年 (Water Ox); 4131 or 3924
- Coptic calendar: 1149–1150
- Discordian calendar: 2599
- Ethiopian calendar: 1425–1426
- Hebrew calendar: 5193–5194
- Hindu calendars
- Vikram Samvat: 1489–1490
- Shaka Samvat: 1354–1355
- Kali Yuga: 4533–4534
- Holocene calendar: 11433
- Igbo calendar: 433–434
- Iranian calendar: 811–812
- Islamic calendar: 836–837
- Japanese calendar: Eikyō 5 (永享５年)
- Javanese calendar: 1348–1349
- Julian calendar: 1433; MCDXXXIII
- Korean calendar: 3766
- Minguo calendar: 479 before ROC 民前479年
- Nanakshahi calendar: −35
- Thai solar calendar: 1975–1976
- Tibetan calendar: ཆུ་ཕོ་བྱི་བ་ལོ་ (male Water-Rat); 1559 or 1178 or 406 — to — ཆུ་མོ་གླང་ལོ་ (female Water-Ox); 1560 or 1179 or 407

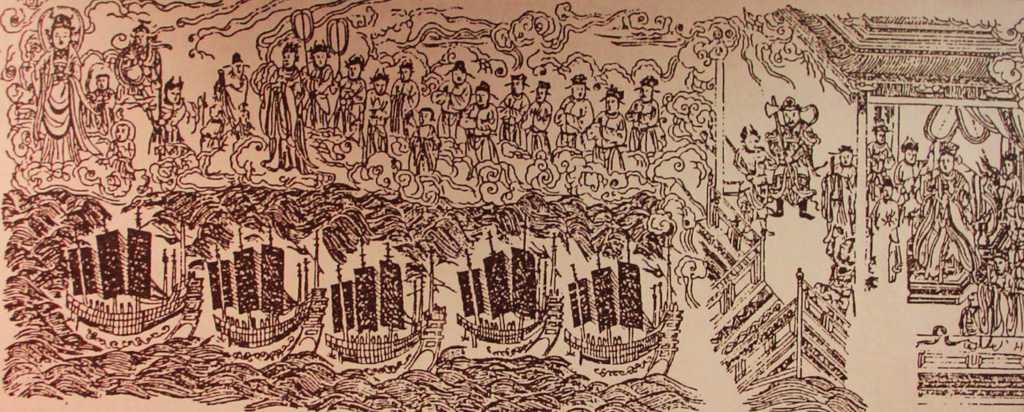
July 22: The last of China's "Treasure Voyages" comes to an end.

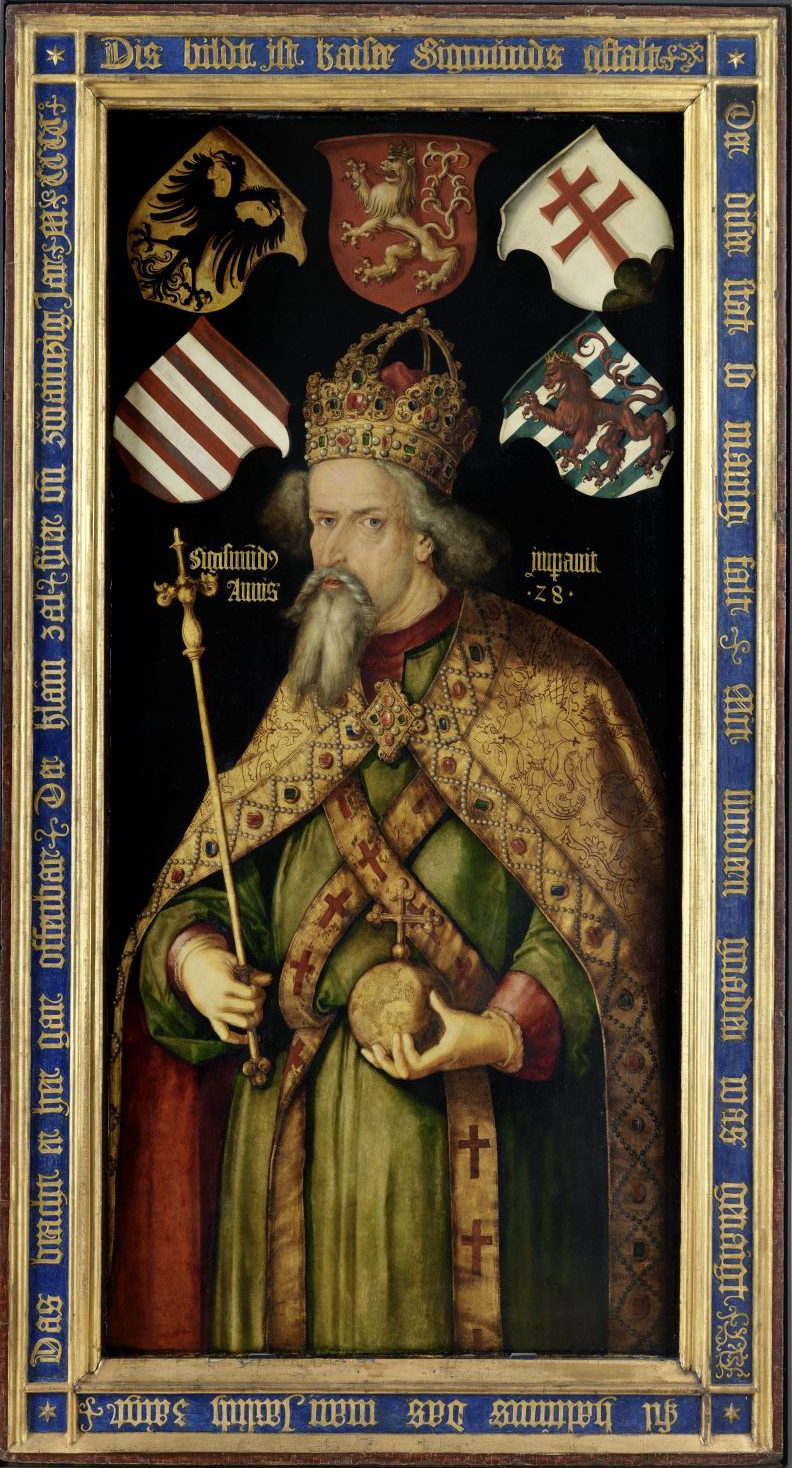
May 31: Sigismund is crowned as Holy Roman Emperor after 52 years (painting by Albrecht Dürer c.1512).

Year 1433 (MCDXXXIII) was a common year starting on Thursday of the Julian calendar.

== Events ==
=== January–March ===
- January 3 – Władysław II Jagiełło, King of Poland, acknowledges the oath of loyalty made on October 25 by Žygimantas I Kęstutaitis, Grand Duke of Lithuania, continuing the progress of the eventual Uniting of Poland and Lithuania.
- January 4 – Prokop the Great, leader of the Hussites of Bohemia, appears at the Council of Basel with his envoys in order to negotiate and end to the anti-Hussite Crusade started by the Holy Roman Empire and the Pope.
- January 9 – At Kraków, King Wladyslaw II of Poland issues the rule of Neminem captivabimus nisi iure victum barring the arrest of any member of Poland's nobility unless that person has first been found guilty of an offense.
- January 17 – The seventh Ming Chinese overseas expedition fleet, led by Admiral Zheng He, arrives at the island of Hormuz in the Persian Gulf, its furthest westward travel and stays for almost two months before setting off for its return to China.
- February 8 – Vasily II, Grand Prince of Moscow, is married to Maria Yaroslavna of Borovsk, but at the wedding banquet, he enters a quarrel with his uncle, Yury Dmitrievich. The argument leads to the Battle on the River Klyazma on April 25.
- February 15 – Pope Eugene IV withdraws his papal bull of 1431 that had ordered the Council of Basel to be dissolved, and declares "that the said council from its very beginning was and is a legitimate council and it should continue as if no dissolution was made."
- March 9 – The Ming Chinese expedition departs from Hormuz Island and begins its four-month voyage home to Beijing.

=== April–June ===
- April 9 – Ispend bin Yusuf deposes Shah Muhammad of Qara Qoyunlu as Governor of Baghdad.
- April 12 – Jacqueline, Countess of Hainaut signs the Treaty of The Hague, abdicating her rule and ownership of the Dutch counties of Holland, Hainaut, Zeeland and Friesland|(all inherited from her father Willem VI of Holland in 1417), transferring them to Philip the Good, Duke of Burgundy
- April 25 – Yury Dmitrievich of Zvenigorod defeats the Grand Prince of Moscow, Vasily II, at the Battle on the River Klyazma, in a war over the succession to the Muscovite throne.
- May 9 – (6th waning of Kason 795 ME) At what is now Mrauk U on the western coast of northern Myanmar, Min Khayi becomes the new King of Arakan upon the death of his older brother, Min Saw Mon.
- May 12 – The Regency Council for King Henry VI summons the members of Parliament to assemble at Westminster on July 8.
- May 13 – Bolko V the Hussite, Duke of Opole and ruler of most of Upper Silesia and much of Lower Silesia in Poland, is defeated by Nicholas V, Duke of Krnov at the Battle of Trzebnica.
- May 17 – The Principality of Brunswick-Wolfenbüttel becomes the first state in the Holy Roman Empire to abolish serfdom as the Duke Heinrich der Friedfertige ("Heinrich the Peaceful") ends the feudal system there by decree.
- May 31 – Sigismund is crowned as the Holy Roman Emperor in Rome. The Imperial throne has been vacant for more than 52 years since the death of Sigismund's father, Charles IV, in 1378.
- June 24 – The 1431 truce of Staryi Chortoryisk, halting the Lithuanian Civil War, expires and fighting resumes with Poland allying itself with the Hussites against the Teutonic Order.
- June – Sarwe Iyasus becomes the new Emperor of Ethiopia upon the death of his father Takla Maryam.

=== July–September ===
- July 8 – The English Parliament assembles at Westminster, and Roger Hunt is elected as Speaker of the House of Commons.
- July 22 – Admiral Zheng He and the crew of the seventh Ming Chinese overseas expedition return to China, arriving at Beijing two and one half years after their departure on January 19, 1411 from Nanjing. With the completion of the maritime expedition, the fleet is dispersed, altering the balance of power in the Indian Ocean, and making it easier for Portugal and other Western naval powers to gain dominance over the seas.
- August 14 – Edward I becomes King of Portugal.
- September 7 – Cosimo de' Medici, later the unofficial leader of Florence and patron of Marsilio Ficino, is imprisoned in the Palazzo dei Priori. Initially facing life imprisonment, Medici is then exiled by the Albizzi/Strozzi faction instead. He returns a year later, on October 6, 1434.
- September 14 – Emperor Xuanzong of Ming dynasty China welcomes the envoys of 11 foreign nations that had sent representatives to travel back to China with Admiral Zheng He's fleet. Present at the Imperial Court as guests are envoys of the kings of Samudera, Kingdom of Kotte, Kingdom of Cochin, Calicut, Dhofar, Aden, Coimbatore, Hormuz, Jayile and Mecca.
- September 16 – A legate of Cardinal Niccolò Albergati, who had been determined to break up the Council of Basel, arrives at the Council and informs the group that Albergati is ready to negotiate.

=== October–December ===
- October 5 – (7th day of 9th month of the year Quy Suu); In Hanoi (at the time Dong Kinh) 9-year-old Le Thai Tong becomes the new King of Dai Viet and ruler of northern Vietnam upon the death of his father, Le Loi.
- October – Iliaș of Moldavia is deposed by his half-brother and joint ruler Stephen II.
- November 30 – After months of negotiations between the Council of Basel and the Bohemian government, the Compactata of Prague is ratified an assembly of Bohemian and Moravian representatives, resolving the conflict between the Roman Catholic Church and the Hussites.
- December 15 – The Truce of Leczyca is signed between the Kingdom of Poland and the Teutonic Order and temporarily ends the Polish–Teutonic War. The Teutons agree to stop their support of the former Lithuanian Grand Duke Švitrigaila
- December 21 – The Parliament of England closes after six months.

=== Date unknown ===
- In Ming Dynasty China, cotton is listed as a permanent item of trade, on the tax registers of Songjiang prefecture.
- Kalantiaw (of what would later be known as the Philippines) supposedly promulgates the legal code eventually referred to as the Code of Kalantiaw. Modern historians doubt its existence.

== Births ==
- August 31 – Sigismondo d'Este, Italian nobleman (d. 1507)
- September 17 – James of Portugal, Portuguese cardinal (d. 1459)
- September 24 – Shekha of Amarsar, Rajput chieftain (d. 1488)
- September 27 – Stanisław Kazimierczyk, Polish canon regular and saint (d. 1489)
- October 19 – Marsilio Ficino, Florentine philosopher (d. 1499)
- November 10
  - Charles the Bold, Duke of Burgundy (d. 1477)
  - Jeanne de Laval, French noble, queen consort of Naples (d. 1498)
- date unknown
  - Stephen III of Moldavia, prince from 1457 (d. 1504)
  - Giovanni Giocondo, Veronese-born friar, architect and classical scholar (d. 1515)
- probable – Kettil Karlsson, regent of Sweden from 1464 (d. 1465)

== Deaths ==
- April 14 – Lidwina, Dutch saint (b. 1380)
- May 9 – King Min Saw Mon of Arakan
- August 14 – King John I of Portugal (b. 1357)
- August 30 – Peter I, Count of Saint-Pol (b. 1390)
- September – Zweder van Culemborg, Bishop of Utrecht (birth year unknown)
- September 28 – Přemek I, Duke of Opava (b. c.1365)
- December 1 – Emperor Go-Komatsu, the 100th emperor of Japan (b. 1377)
