= Treaty of Christmemel =

1431 treaty between the Teutonic Order and Lithuania

Pages 272-275 from Liv-, esth- und curländisches Urkundenbuch nebst Regesten with the full-text of the Treaty of Christmemel

The Treaty of Christmemel (Lithuanian: Skirsnemunės sutartis) was a treaty signed on 19 June 1431 between Paul von Rusdorf, Grand Master the Teutonic Knights, and Švitrigaila, Grand Duke of Lithuania. Švitrigaila was preparing for a war with Poland to defend his claim to the Lithuanian throne and sought allies. The treaty established an anti-Polish alliance and prompted the Knights to invade the Kingdom of Poland, starting the Polish–Teutonic War (1431–35). Lithuania also surrendered Palanga and three miles of the coastline on the Baltic Sea, thus modifying the Treaty of Melno of 1422.

== Background ==
Grand Duke Vytautas died in October 1430 leaving no heir to rule the Grand Duchy of Lithuania. According to the terms of the 1413 Union of Horodło, the Lithuanian nobility pledged not to elect a new Grand Duke without the approval of the Kingdom of Poland. Nevertheless, Lithuanian nobles unilaterally elected Švitrigaila, brother of King of Poland Jogaila, as their Grand Duke. Švitrigaila refused to acknowledge fealty to his brother and sought to obtain royal crown, originally intended for Vytautas. Poland and Lithuania began preparations for a war. Švitrigaila sought allies against Poland and envisioned a grand alliance of the Grand Duchy of Lithuania, Holy Roman Empire, Teutonic Knights, Moldavia, and Golden Horde. Securing Teutonic support was of paramount importance.

== Negotiations and content ==
The Teutonic Knights were a natural ally of Švitrigaila as they wanted to undo the Polish–Lithuanian union, established in 1385, which led to their defeat in the 1410 Battle of Grunwald and 1422 Gollub War. Švitrigaila began talks with the Knights soon after the death of Vytautas and kept sending envoys to Prussia. However, Grand Master Paul von Rusdorf delayed and consulted with the Livonian Order, Sigismund, Holy Roman Emperor, prince-electors, and Pope Martin V. Livonian Order advised to support Švitrigaila but also not to sever the relationship with Poland, Sigismund and prince-electors supported the alliance, while the pope opposed it. Towards the end of May 1431, Rusdorf personally met with Švitrigaila but again refused to enter into an agreement motivating that he needed to discuss the proposals with Prussian estates. Rusdorf's reluctance could be explained by Poland's attempts to form a Polish–Teutonic alliance against Švitrigaila.

Eventually, the treaty was concluded on 19 June 1431 in Christmemel (present-day Skirsnemunė). The treaty established a military alliance: if one party was attacked, the other was obliged to defend; war is declared only if both parties agree; any peace agreement would apply to both parties equally; spoils of war would be divided equally. The treaty had no expiration and would survive the deaths of Švitrigaila and Rusdorf if their heirs confirmed the agreement. The treaty was signed by Rusdorf, Livonian Master Zisse von Rutenberg, and Prussian bishops (notably Johannes Ambundii, Archbishop of Riga, did not participate). On the Lithuanian side it was signed by Švitrigaila, his brother Lengvenis and cousin Sigismund Kęstutaitis, Lithuanian bishops and nobles. Nine Lithuanian nobles were: Castellan of Vilnius Kristinas Astikas, Elder of Vilnius Jurgis Gedgaudas, Elder of Samogitia Mykolas Kęsgaila, Voivode of Trakai Jaunius Kęsgaila, Castellan of Trakai Sungaila, Grand Marshal of Lithuania Rumbaudas Valimantaitis, Chodko Jurewicz, regent of Navahrudak Petras Mantigirdaitis, court marshal Jonas Goštautas.

== Aftermath ==
Following the Treaty of Christmemel, the Knights invaded Poland and ravaged the Dobrzyń Land before suffering a defeat in the Battle of Nakel in September 1431. At the same time Polish army invaded Volhynia and besieged Švitrigaila in the Lubart's Castle in Lutsk. Švitrigaila proposed peace and a formal two-year Truce of Staryi Chortoryisk was signed on 1 September.

The treaty of 1431 was confirmed again in Christmemel on 15 May 1432. The second treaty had 50 witnesses, however historians noted that some prominent figures of Lithuanian nobility, including Kristinas Astikas, were missing. This is interpreted as a sign of growing opposition to Švitrigaila's reign. Indeed, a group of nobles organized a coup and deposed of Švitrigaila in August 1432. The Knights formally observed the Truce of Staryi Chortoryisk, but also continued to support Švitrigaila, mostly through the Livonian Order. Their alliance was decisively defeated in the Battle of Wiłkomierz in September 1435.
