= Jakub Kobylański =

"Grzymała" coat of arms, used by the Kobylański family.

Jakub Kobylański (or Jakub of Kobylany) (born ? - died 20 May 1454) was a Polish knight, and a court marshal to the Lithuanian Grand Duke Vytautas (Witold) between 1425 and 1430. He also served as the castellan of Biecz from 1444, and of Gniezno from 1453 until his death. He was also the Royal Krajczy ("Court Carver") to King of Poland Casimir IV Jagiellon, beginning in 1450.

He was the brother of the starost of Brzesko, Jan Kobylański, and the grandson of the vice-treasurer of the crown Hinczka of Rogow.

According to the Polish chronicler Jan Długosz, Kobylański took part in the Siege of Malbork (Marienburg) in 1410, under Władysław II Jagiełło, during the Polish–Lithuanian–Teutonic War.

In 1428 Kobylański led the Polish mercenary troops which served under Grand Duke Vytautas and took part in the fighting between the Grand Duke and Veliky Novgorod.

In 1435 Polish troops under the command of Kobylański were sent as aid to Sigismund Kęstutaitis (Zygmunt Kiejstutowicz), who was involved in a civil war in Lithuania against his cousin Švitrigaila (Świdrygiełło). Kobylański commanded the combined Polish-Lithuanian force at the Battle of Wilkomierz (present day Ukmergė) where he won a victory over Švitrigaila and the Teutonic Knights who supported him. The outcome of the battle had a significant impact on the civil war in Lithuania, as well as the war between the Crown of Poland and the Monastic State of the Teutonic Knights. Most of the top commanders of the Livonian branch of the order perished in the battle.
