= 1431 =

1431 in various calendars
- Gregorian calendar: 1431; MCDXXXI
- Ab urbe condita: 2184
- Armenian calendar: 880; ԹՎ ՊՁ
- Assyrian calendar: 6181
- Balinese saka calendar: 1352–1353
- Bengali calendar: 837–838
- Berber calendar: 2381
- English Regnal year: 9 Hen. 6 – 10 Hen. 6
- Buddhist calendar: 1975
- Burmese calendar: 793
- Byzantine calendar: 6939–6940
- Chinese calendar: 庚戌年 (Metal Dog); 4128 or 3921 — to — 辛亥年 (Metal Pig); 4129 or 3922
- Coptic calendar: 1147–1148
- Discordian calendar: 2597
- Ethiopian calendar: 1423–1424
- Hebrew calendar: 5191–5192
- Hindu calendars
- Vikram Samvat: 1487–1488
- Shaka Samvat: 1352–1353
- Kali Yuga: 4531–4532
- Holocene calendar: 11431
- Igbo calendar: 431–432
- Iranian calendar: 809–810
- Islamic calendar: 834–835
- Japanese calendar: Eikyō 3 (永享３年)
- Javanese calendar: 1346–1347
- Julian calendar: 1431; MCDXXXI
- Korean calendar: 3764
- Minguo calendar: 481 before ROC 民前481年
- Nanakshahi calendar: −37
- Thai solar calendar: 1973–1974
- Tibetan calendar: ལྕགས་ཕོ་ཁྱི་ལོ་ (male Iron-Dog); 1557 or 1176 or 404 — to — ལྕགས་མོ་ཕག་ལོ་ (female Iron-Boar); 1558 or 1177 or 405

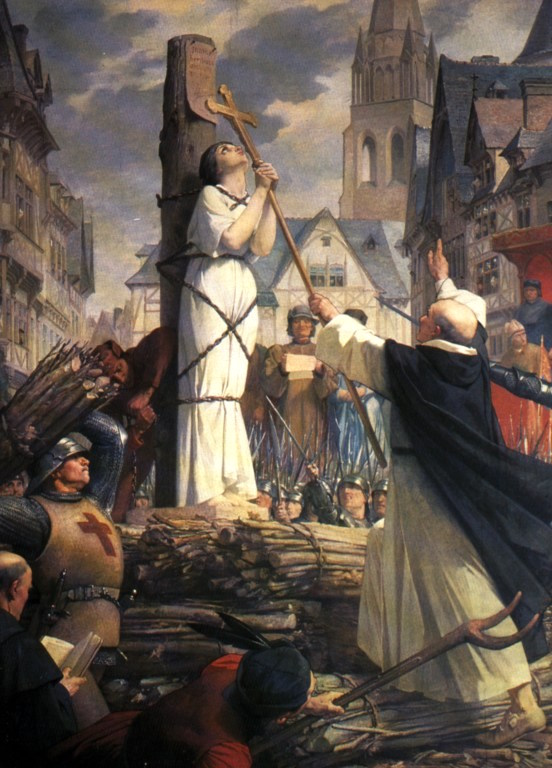
May 30: Joan of Arc is burned at the stake.

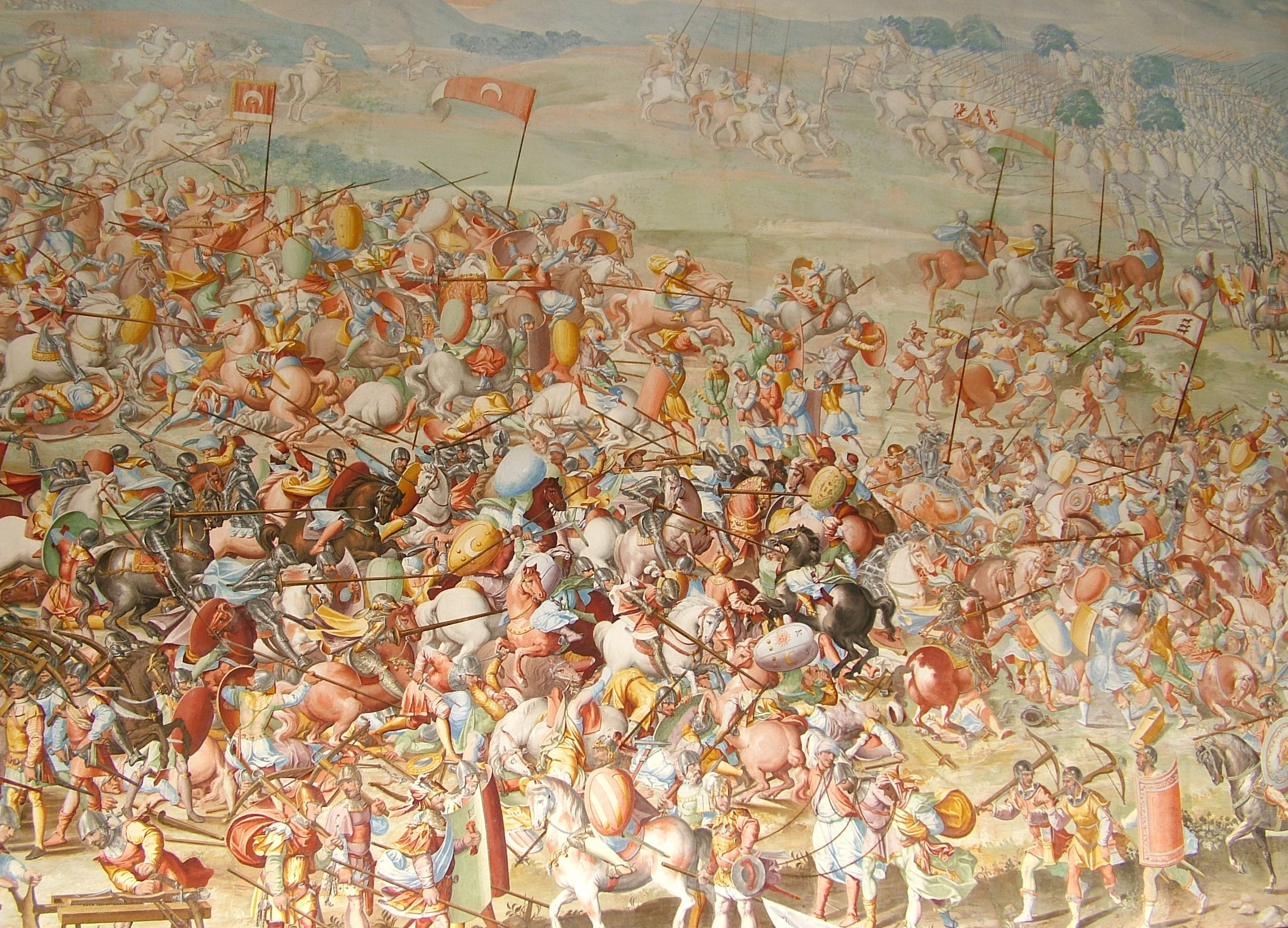
July 1: Christians and Moors fight in Spain in the Battle of La Higueruela.

Year 1431 (MCDXXXI) was a common year starting on Monday of the Julian calendar.

== Events ==
=== January–March ===
- January 9 – Pretrial investigations for Joan of Arc begin at Rouen in France, which is under English occupation.
- February 21 – The trial of Joan of Arc for heresy begins.
- March 11 – Cardinal Gabriele Condulmer is elected as the successor to Pope Martin V and takes the name of Pope Eugene IV as the 207th leader of the Roman Catholic Church.
- March – Alexander I Aldea takes the throne of Wallachia with support from Alexander I of Moldavia.

=== April–June ===
- April 4 – In Poland, Konrad V Kantner, Duke of Silesia, leads a raid against the Hussites at Gliwice.
- April 5 – In Germany, Jacob of the House of Zähringen becomes the new Margrave of Baden-Baden upon the death of his father, Bernard I.
- May 30 – 19-year-old Joan of Arc is burned at the stake in Rouen.
- June 6 – The Battle on the Po takes place on the Po River in Italy near Cremona as the navy of the Duchy of Milan defeats a fleet of 85 galleys of the Republic of Venice. The Venetians lose over 2,500 men, as well as 28 of the galley warships and 42 transport ships.
- June 16 – The Teutonic Knights and Švitrigaila sign the Treaty of Christmemel, creating an anti-Polish alliance.
- June 25 – The Polish army invades the Principality of Volhynia, part of modern-day Ukraine, and captures much of the territory.

=== July–September ===
- July 1 – Reconquista: In Spain, the army of the Crown of Castile, led by Álvaro de Luna, defeats the Moors of the Emirate of Granada, led by the Sultan Muhammad IX, in the Battle of La Higueruela, fought at Vega de Granada.
- July 2 – In the Battle of Bulgnéville over who will be the next Duke of Lorraine, Count Antoine de Vaudémont, supported by Burgundian and English troops, defeats René of Anjou, who is supported by the Kingdom of France.
- July 25 – An ecumenical council of the Roman Catholic Church, originally called by Pope Martin V before his death in February, convenes at Basel in Switzerland.
- August 14 – Hussites under Prokop the Great and Sigismund Korybut defeat the forces of Frederick of Brandenburg at the Battle of Domažlice.
- August 21 – The navy of the Republic of Venice, commanded by Admiral Pietro Loredan, gains a major victory over the Republic of Genoa in a battle off of the coast of Rapallo, but fails to overthrow the Doge Battista Spinola
- August 26 (September 2 N.S.) – At the Polish city of Chortoryisk, representatives of Švitrigaila, Grand Duke of Lithuania and of the King of Poland, Władysław II Jagiełło agree to a truce to end the Lutsk War.
- September 13 – The army of Poland defeats the Teutonic Knights at the Battle of Dąbki,
- September – Battle of Inverlochy: Donald Balloch defeats the Royalists in Scotland.

=== October–December ===
- October 15 – The Roman Catholic Council of Basel issues a formal invitation to the Hussites to take part in its deliberations.
- October 30 – The Treaty of Medina del Campo is signed, consolidating peace between Portugal and Castille.
- November 9 – The Hungarians defeat the Hussite army at the Battle of Ilava.
- November 18 – A treaty in Suceava concludes an attack on Poland, launched this year by Alexander I of Moldavia during the Lithuanian Civil War.
- December 13 – Vlad, future Prince of Wallachia as Vlad II Dracul, is made a member of the Order of the Dragon. Because of this, his son Vlad the Impaler will inspire the literary figure named Dracula.
- December 14 – The first full meeting of the Roman Catholic council at Basel is convened, but Pope Eugene IV and the council members are not able to agree on principles.
- December 16 – Henry VI of England is crowned King of France at Notre-Dame de Paris.

=== Date unknown ===
- The University of Poitiers is founded.
- The Ayutthaya Kingdom besieges Angkor and sacks the Khmer capital, ending the Khmer Empire.
- Nezahualcoyotl is crowned Tlatoani of the Kingdom of Texcoco.
- Byzantine–Ottoman Wars: The Ottoman governor of Thessaly Turahan Bey breaks through the Hexamilion wall for the second time, and ravages the Peloponnese Peninsula.

== Births ==
- January 1 – Pope Alexander VI (d. 1503)
- October 26 – Ercole I d'Este, Duke of Ferrara, Italian politician (d. 1505)
- November or December – Vlad the Impaler, Prince of Wallachia (d. 1476)
- date unknown
  - William Elphinstone, Scottish statesman (d. 1514)
  - Helena Palaiologina, Despotess of Serbia (d. 1473)
  - Ladislaus Hunyadi, Hungarian statesman and warrior (d. 1457)
- probable
  - William Hastings, 1st Baron Hastings (d. 1483)
  - John Neville, 1st Marquess of Montagu, English politician (d. 1471)
  - François Villon, French poet
  - Vlad the Impaler, Prince of Wallachia, A member of the House of Drăculești, as well as the Voivode of Wallachia 1456-1462

== Deaths ==
- January 25 – Charles II, Duke of Lorraine (b. 1365)
- February 20 – Pope Martin V (b. 1368)
- April 1 – Nuno Álvares Pereira, Portuguese general and religious figure
- April 5 – Bernard I, Margrave of Baden-Baden (b. 1364)
- April 19 – Adolph III, Count of Waldeck (b. 1362)
- May 30 – Joan of Arc, French soldier and saint (b. c. 1412)
- September 6 – Demetrios Laskaris Leontares, Byzantine soldier and statesman
- December 8 – Hedwig Jagiellon, Polish and Lithuanian princess (b. 1408)
- date unknown
  - Makhdoom Ali Mahimi, Indian Sufi mystic
  - Stanisław of Skarbimierz, Polish theologian (b. 1360)
  - Violant of Bar, queen regent of Aragon (b. 1365)
