= Lithuanian Civil War (1432–1438) =

War of succession in medieval Lithuania

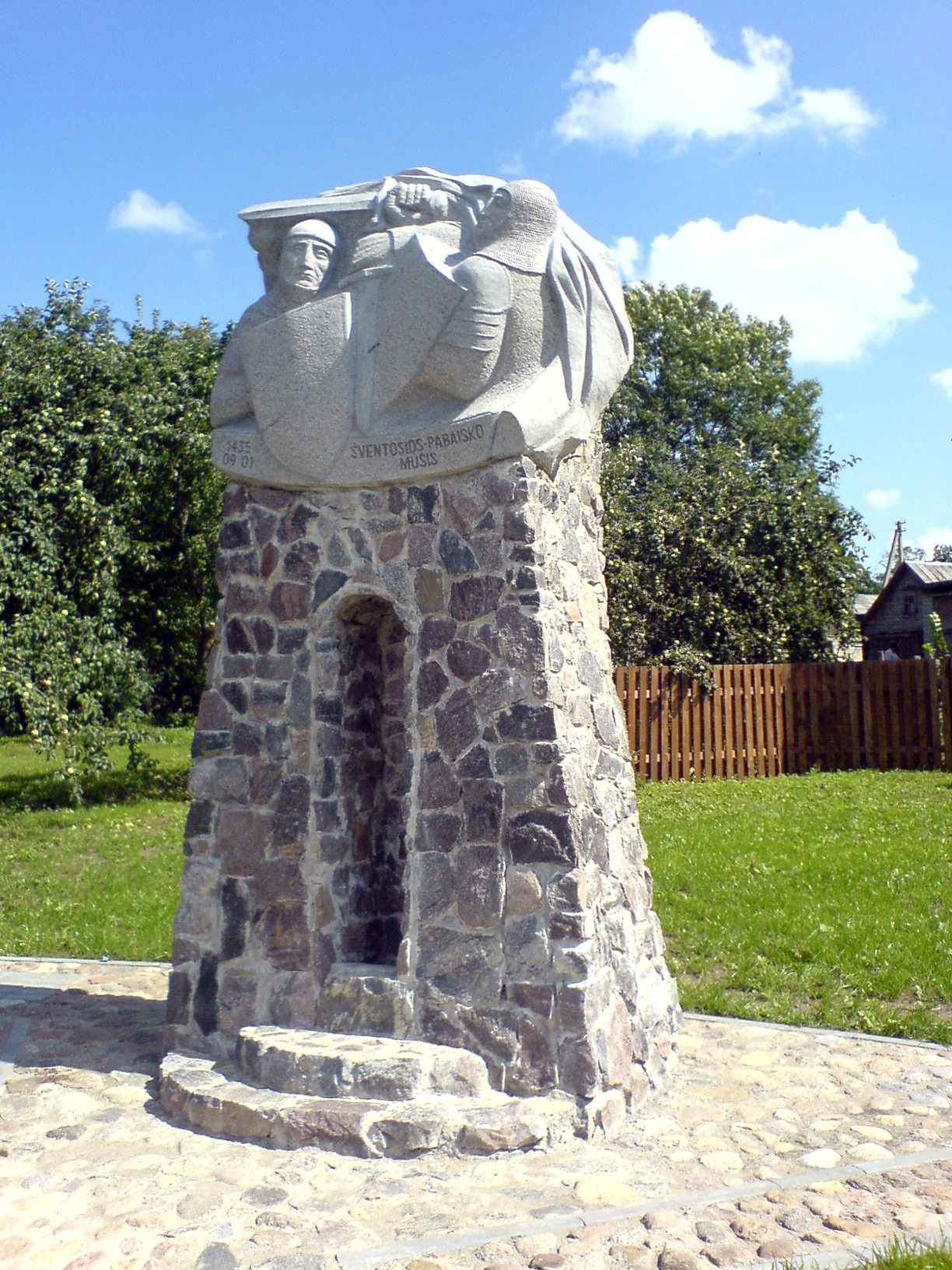
- Monument at the field of the Battle of Wiłkomierz
Date	August 1432 – 1438
Location	Grand Duchy of Lithuania
Result	Švitrigaila's defeat

Belligerents
Grand Duchy of Ruthenia (Švitrigaila's supporters); Teutonic Order; Livonian Order; Golden Horde; Principality of Moldavia; Support: Hussite Bohemia	Grand Duchy of Lithuania (Sigismund's supporters); Kingdom of Poland; Support: Orphans (Hussite mercenaries)

Commanders and leaders
Švitrigaila; Sigismund Korybut †; Paul von Rusdorf; Franco Kerskorff †	Sigismund Kęstutaitis; Michael Žygimantaitis; Jogaila; Jan Čapek of Sány

The Lithuanian Civil War of 1432–1438 was a war of succession to the throne of the Grand Duchy of Lithuania, after Vytautas the Great died in 1430 without leaving an heir. The war was fought on the one side by Švitrigaila, allied with the Teutonic Knights, and on the other by Sigismund Kęstutaitis, backed by the Kingdom of Poland. The war threatened to sever the Union of Krewo, the personal union between Poland and Lithuania. Švitrigaila's alliance with the Grand Master of the Teutonic Order, Paul von Rusdorf, launched the Polish–Teutonic War (1431–1435) but failed to secure victory for Švitrigaila.

When Sigismund seized power in Lithuania by staging a coup in 1432, Lithuania split into two opposing camps, and there began three years of devastating hostilities. To prevent the Knights from continuing their support of Švitrigaila, Poland backed a Hussite invasion of Prussia in 1433. The war ended in a decisive defeat for Švitrigaila and his ally, the Livonian branch of the Teutonic Knights, at the Battle of Wiłkomierz in September 1435. Švitrigaila eventually surrendered in 1437; Sigismund Kęstutaitis ruled Lithuania for only eight years before he was assassinated in 1440.

== Prelude ==
The Grand Duchy of Lithuania and the Kingdom of Poland had created several tenuous unions in the decades preceding the conflict, including the 1385 Union of Krewo, the 1392 Ostrów Agreement, and the 1413 Union of Horodło. The two states had successfully joined forces against a common enemy, the Teutonic Knights, at the 1410 Battle of Grunwald. The Knights' defeat in the battle weakened but did not completely vanquish their military power and they continued to engage in lesser conflicts. Internal tensions within the tentatively unified state persisted after the battle. While Jogaila (Jagiełło) and Vytautas had converted to Roman Catholicism, the Eastern Orthodox elite, along with some Lithuanian magnates, opposed a closer union with Poland.

On 27 October 1430 Vytautas the Great, Grand Duke of Lithuania, suddenly died without leaving an heir or a will. His coronation as King of Lithuania had been scheduled for September 1430, but the Poles had prevented the crown from reaching Lithuania. Vytautas' only daughter, Sophia of Lithuania, had married Vasily I of Moscow and had only one surviving son, Vasily II. Aside from having his hands full with his own Muscovite War of Succession (1425–1453) against various relatives, he was Orthodox and could not lead the recently Christianized Catholic Grand Duchy. Their adherence to the Orthodox faith also prevented many other Gediminids from becoming pretenders to the throne. There were two most suitable Catholic candidates: Vytautas' brother and legal heir, Sigismund Kęstutaitis, and Vytautas' cousin Švitrigaila.

The Lithuanian nobles unilaterally elected Švitrigaila as the new Grand Duke. This violated the terms of the Union of Horodło of 1413, wherein the Lithuanians had pledged not to elect a new Grand Duke without the approval of the Kingdom of Poland. At the time Jogaila (Jagiełło), King of Poland and brother of Švitrigaila, was in Lithuania and participated in the funeral of Vytautas. On 7 November 1430, he announced that he approved the election and that Polish–Lithuanian relationship would be formally determined on 15 August 1431. However, an armed conflict erupted due to territorial disputes in Podolia and Volhynia, which, according to the understanding of the Polish nobility, under the terms of a 1411 agreement, were to have been ruled by Lithuania only during the lifetime of Vytautas.

== Lutsk War ==
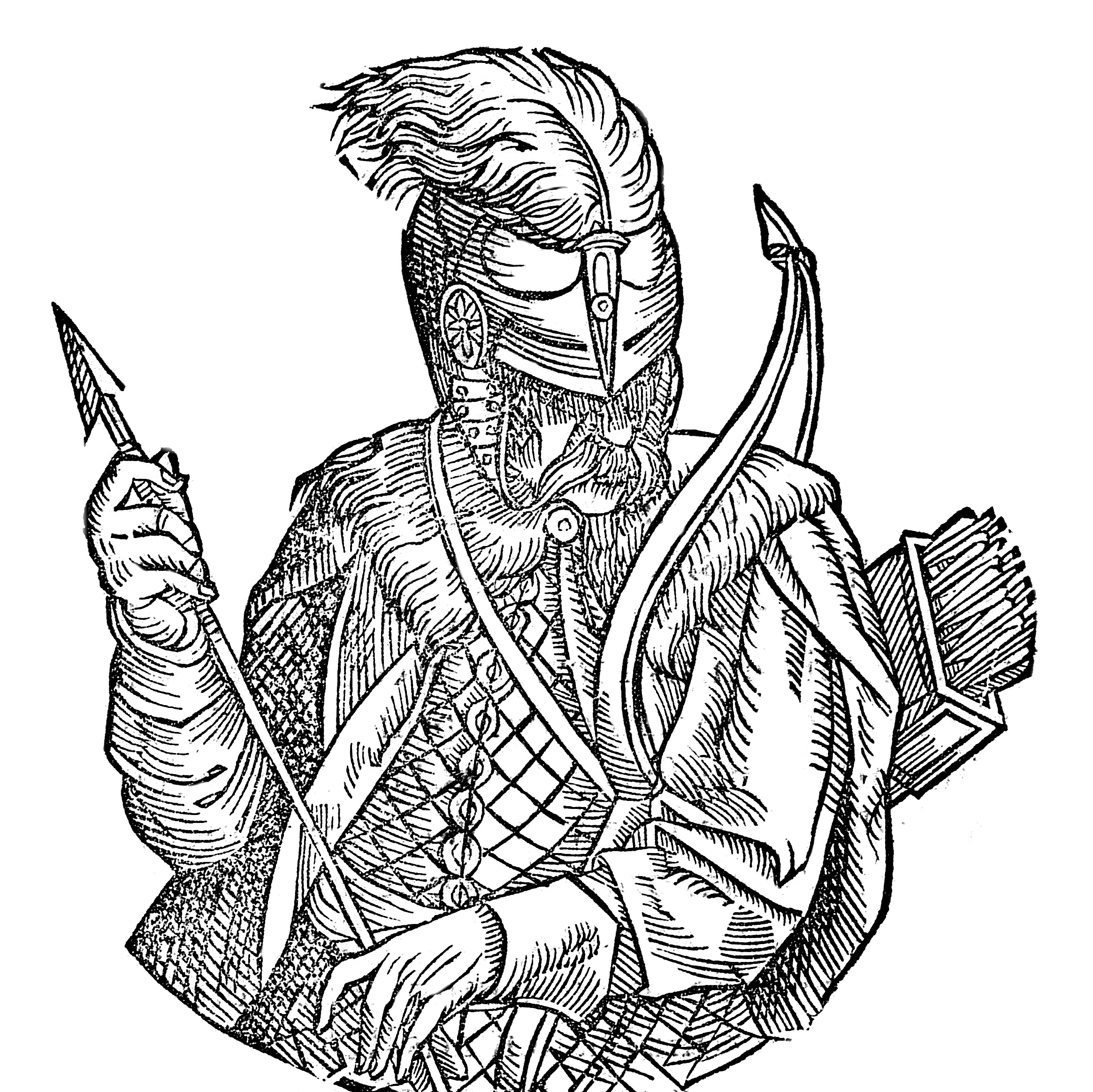
Švitrigaila as portrayed by Alexander Guagnini

When Polish troops invaded Podolia, Švitrigaila arrested his brother Jogaila, King of Poland, in Vilnius. Jogaila was released when he promised to return Podolia to the Grand Duchy of Lithuania. The Polish nobility, led by Zbigniew Oleśnicki, gathered in Sandomierz in February 1431. Outraged, they voided the King's promises and demanded that Švitrigaila acknowledge his fealty to Jogaila. Švitrigaila refused, professed full independence, and even asked Holy Roman Emperor Sigismund to send him the crown that had been intended for Vytautas. In the same letter, Švitrigaila promised his loyalty to Sigismund and discussed a possible marriage to a daughter of Voivode of Moldavia.

Švitrigaila began organizing a wider anti-Polish coalition. He negotiated with the Teutonic Knights, with Holy Roman Emperor Sigismund, with Moldavia, with the Golden Horde, and with the dukes of the eastern lands of the Grand Duchy of Lithuania. The most promising prospect as an ally was the Teutonic Order, which was seeking to undo the Polish–Lithuanian union that had led to the Order's defeat at the Battle of Grunwald (1410). In June 1431 the Teutonic Knights and Švitrigaila signed the Treaty of Christmemel. Švitrigaila's cause was also aided by Moldavian forces led by Alexander the Good, who attacked Poland in the southeast.

On 25 June 1431, the Polish army invaded Volhynia. They captured part of Volhynia, Horodło, Volodymyr-Volynskyi, and Zbarazh, and defeated Švitrigaila's men near Lutsk. However, the Poles did not succeed in capturing Lubart's Castle. At the same time, pursuant to the Treaty of Christmemel, the Teutonic Knights declared war and invaded Poland. Finding little opposition, the Knights ravaged Dobrzyń Land, taking the town of Nieszawa, and tried to move on to the Kuyavia and Krajna regions. However, the Teutonic army was defeated on 13 September 1431 at Dąbki, near Nakel (now Nakło nad Notecią). Švitrigaila, who was besieged in the Lubart's Castle, offered to negotiate peace on 20 August. An agreement was reached on 26 August, thus ending the so-called Lutsk War. A formal truce was signed at Staryi Chortoryisk on 1 September until 24 June 1433. The agreement was more favorable to Poland. The truce did not solve the underlying dispute, however. The war was transformed into a diplomatic struggle, as Poland sought to turn the Lithuanian nobles against Švitrigaila.

== Coup in Lithuania ==
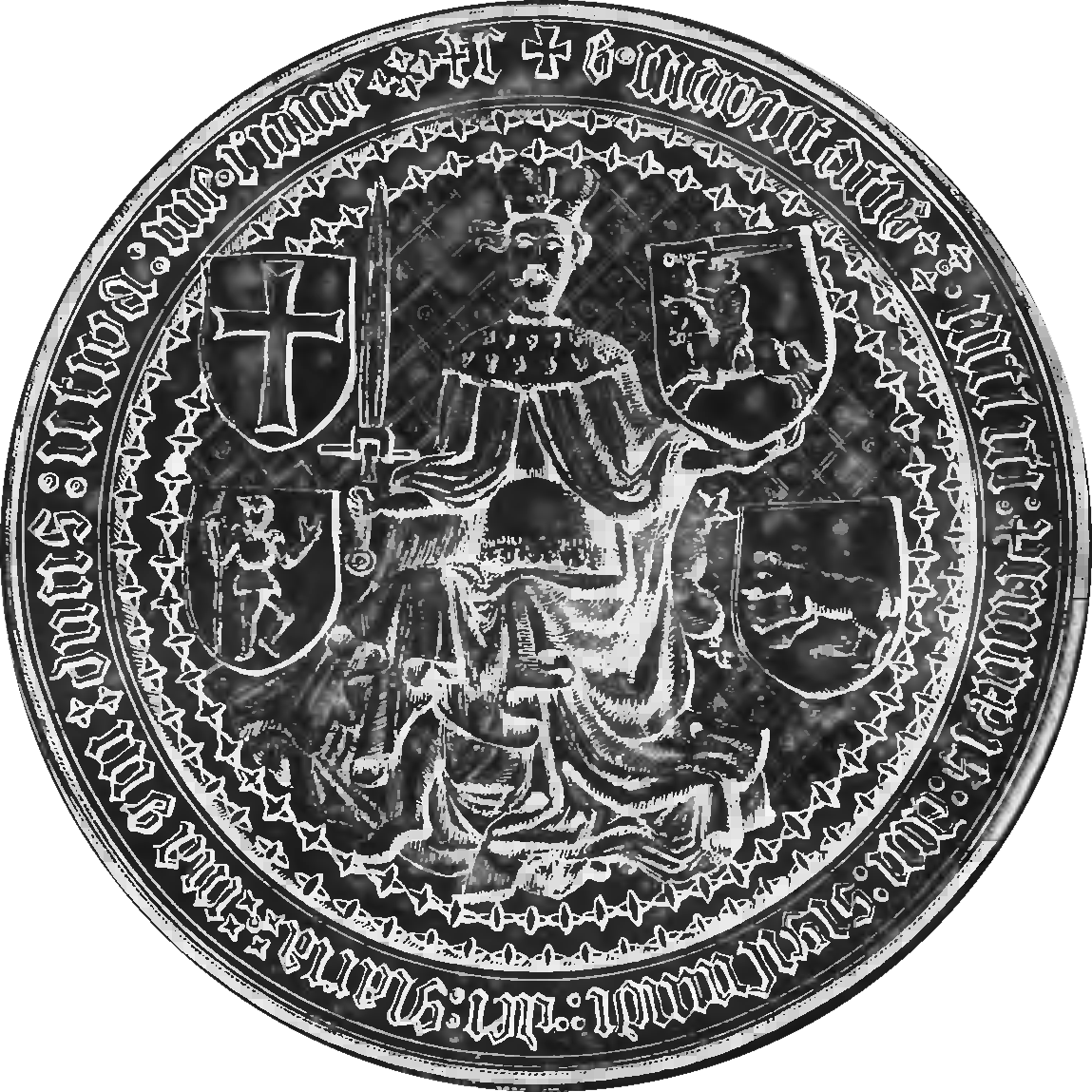
Royal seal of Sigismund Kęstutaitis

In April 1432 at Sieradz, the Poles offered to Švitrigaila the same deal as Vytautas had during his reign: Švitrigaila would be the Grand Duke and Jogaila would be the Supreme Duke and after Švitrigaila's death Lithuanian throne would revert to one of Jogaila's sons. Švitrigaila ostensibly refused the offer crystallizing local resistance. On 31 August 1432, conspirators, including Semen Olshanski, Petras Mangirdaitis, and Jonas Goštautas, attacked Švitrigaila and his escort at Ashmyany, where they were staying the night. Švitrigaila and some of his supporters, including Jurgis Gedgaudas and Jonas Manvydas, managed to escape to Polotsk while his pregnant wife was detained. The conspirators installed Sigismund Kęstutaitis, brother of Vytautas, as the new Grand Duke. It is unclear what groups supported Sigismund or why. Possibly some Lithuanian nobles were displeased with favors that Švitrigaila had granted to the Orthodox dukes, but prior to the coup no opposition had manifested itself. Sigismund, who had not played a major role in Lithuanian politics before the coup, and who had initially supported Švitrigaila, resumed the policy of union with Poland. On 15 October 1432 he signed the Union of Grodno, which in essence confirmed the Union of Vilnius and Radom (1401) and granted Sigismund the same rights as Vytautas had enjoyed during his reign. Following Sigismund's death, Lithuania was to return to the King of Poland. Sigismund also made territorial concessions to Poland in disputed Podolia and Volhynia.

To win support from the nobles, in May 1434 Sigismund granted a privilege to both Catholic and Orthodox nobles. The privilege guaranteed their right to buy, sell, exchange, gift, and inherit land. The veldamas, a class of dependent peasants, were released from taxes and obligations to the state—all their earnings now belonged to the nobles. No noble was to be punished or imprisoned for crimes without a court order. Lithuania divided into two camps: supporters of Sigismund (the Lithuanian lands, Samogitia, Trakai Voivodeship, and Minsk); and supporters of Švitrigaila (Polotsk, Vitebsk, Smolensk, Kiev, Volhynia). There began three years of devastating hostilities. On 8 December 1432 the armies of Švitrigaila and Sigismund met in the Battle of Ašmena. Švitrigaila had enlisted the aid of Sayid Ahmad I, Khan of the Golden Horde, and wrote to Pope Eugene IV and Council of Florence hoping to gain their support by promising a church union. He planned to attack the Grand Duchy's capital, Vilnius, and resume the throne. Both sides suffered heavy losses, and final victory went to Sigismund. The Teutonic Order officially observed the truce, but continued its secret support for Švitrigaila, mostly through its Livonian branch.

== Hussite invasion of Prussia ==
In June 1433 Poland allied itself with the Czech Hussites in order to stop the Teutonic Order from sending secret support to Švitrigaila via its Livonian branch. The Teutonic Knights had supported the Pope and Holy Roman Emperor Sigismund against the heretic Hussites during the Hussite Wars. During their last and largest "beautiful ride", the Czech forces under Jan Čapek of Sány were also supported by Pomeranian Duke Bogusław IX of the Duchy of Stolp (Słupsk). For four months the Hussite army ravaged Teutonic territories in Neumark, Pomerania, and western Prussia. They attacked Konitz (now Chojnice), Schwetz (now Świecie) and Danzig (now Gdańsk). They captured several towns and castles, including Dirschau (now Tczew) on 29 August 1433. Despite their failed siege of Danzig, the Hussites celebrated their "beautiful ride" by symbolically filling their bottles with water from the Baltic Sea.

On 13 September 1433 a truce was signed at Jasiniec. Polish–Teutonic negotiations continued at Brześć Kujawski, and Hussite–Catholic negotiations continued at the Council of Florence and at the Czech Diet in Prague. The Polish-led invasion of Neumark and Pomerania had proven successful, cutting the Teutonic Order off from support from the Holy Roman Empire, and convincing the Order to sign a treaty with the Poles. On 15 December 1433, twelve-year Truce of Łęczyca was signed between the Poles and the Order at Łęczyca (leading some Polish historians to divide this Polish–Teutonic War into two wars: in 1431–1433; and in 1435). The Teutonic Knights agreed to most of the Polish demands, including that the Order cease its support for Švitrigaila, each side would control the territories that it occupied until a peace was signed (uti possidetis), and no party would seek mediation by foreign powers in order to alter this truce. This marked the end of the war on Polish soil; the struggle on Lithuanian lands would continue for two more years, as the truce with Poland did not extend to the Livonian Order.

== Decisive battle ==
In July and August 1433, Švitrigaila and his Livonian allies raided Lida, Kreva and Eišiškės and devastated the suburbs of Vilnius, Trakai and Kaunas. The hostilities were briefly stopped by horse plague. When Jogaila died in May 1434, the Order resumed its backing for Švitrigaila, who rallied his supporters, including knights from the Livonian Order, the Orthodox dukes, and his nephew Sigismund Korybut, a distinguished military commander of the Hussites. In July 1435, Švitrigaila foiled a coup against him in Smolensk. Coup leader Orthodox bishop Gerasim, consecrated as Metropolitan of Moscow in 1432, was burned at the stake. The final battle at Wiłkomierz (Vilkomir, Vilkmergė) was fought in September 1435, northwest of Vilnius. It is estimated to have involved 30,000 men on both sides. Švitrigaila's army, led by Sigismund Korybut, was split by the attacking Lithuanian–Polish army, led by Michael Žygimantaitis, and soundly defeated.

Švitrigaila, with a small group of followers, managed to escape to Polotsk. The Livonian Order had suffered a great defeat, sometimes compared to that which had been inflicted on the Teutonic Knights at Grunwald in 1410. On 31 December 1435 the Teutonic Knights signed a peace treaty at Brześć Kujawski. They agreed to cease their support for Švitrigaila, and in the future to support only Grand Dukes who had been properly elected jointly by Poland and Lithuania. The treaty did not change the borders that had been set by the Treaty of Melno in 1422. The Peace of Brześć Kujawski showed that the Teutonic Knights had lost their universal missionary status. The Teutonic and Livonian Orders no longer interfered in Polish–Lithuanian affairs; instead, Poland and Lithuania would involve themselves in the Thirteen Years' War (1454–66), the civil war that would tear Prussia in half.

== Aftermath ==
Švitrigaila was losing his influence in the Slavic principalities and could no longer resist Poland and Sigismund Kęstutaitis. On 4 September 1437, he attempted to reconcile with Poland: he would rule the lands that still backed him (chiefly Kiev and Volhynia), and after his death these territories would pass to the King of Poland. However, under strong protest from Sigismund, the Polish Senate declined to ratify the treaty. In 1438 Švitrigaila withdrew to Moldavia. (Note: "...though he objected to the compromise by which the Poles gave Svidrigailo Volhynia and Kiev, it was not until Polish troops withdrew from Łuck that Svidrigailo thought it prudent to leave for Moldavia.") The reign of Sigismund Kęstutaitis was brief — he was assassinated in 1440. Švitrigaila returned from exile in 1442 and ruled Lutsk until his death a decade later.

Jogaila's son Casimir IV Jagiellon, born in 1426, received approval as a hereditary hospodar from Lithuania's ruling families in 1440. This event is seen by the historians Jerzy Lukowski and Hubert Zawadzki as marking the end of the succession dispute.

== See also ==
- Lithuanian Civil War (1381–1384)
- Lithuanian Civil War (1389–1392)
- List of wars involving Lithuania
- List of wars of succession in Europe

== Bibliography ==
- Urban, William (2003). Tannenberg and After. Chicago: Lithuanian Research and Studies Center. p. 500. ISBN 0-929700-25-2.
