= Treaty of Brest =

Peace treaty of Brest may refer to:

- Peace of Brześć Kujawski, 31 December 1435
- Treaty of Brest-Litovsk (Ukraine–Central Powers), 9 February 1918
- Treaty of Brest-Litovsk, 3 March 1918

== See also ==
- Union of Brest, 1595–96
