= Pabaiskas =

- Town
- Location within Lithuania
- Coordinates: 55°10′1.2″N 24°46′1.2″E
- Country: Lithuania
- County: Vilnius County

Population (2011)
  - Total: 234
- Time zone: UTC+2 (EET)
  - Summer (DST): UTC+3 (EEST)

Pabaiskas is a small town in Ukmergė district of Vilnius County, Lithuania, 10 kilometres (6.2 mi) southwest of Ukmergė, with 249 inhabitants. The Battle of Vilkmergė took place here in 1435, when Sigismund Kestutaitis defeated Švitrigaila and his Livonian Order allies. Pabaiskas was built afterwards to commemorate the battle.

Pabaiskas was the location of one of many Roman Catholic churches where the priests had to know the Lithuanian language according to the Grand Duke of Lithuania Alexander Jagiellon in 1501.

The word "pabaiskas" is derived from the Polish "pobojowisko", literally meaning "battle site". Alternative names of the town include Pabaisko, Pabayskas, Pobojsk (Polish), and Paboisk (Yiddish).

There is a Holy Trinity Church in the town, built in 1436 by Sigismund Kestutaitis. A more modern stonework church was built in 1821–1836. The architect was J. Levoisier.

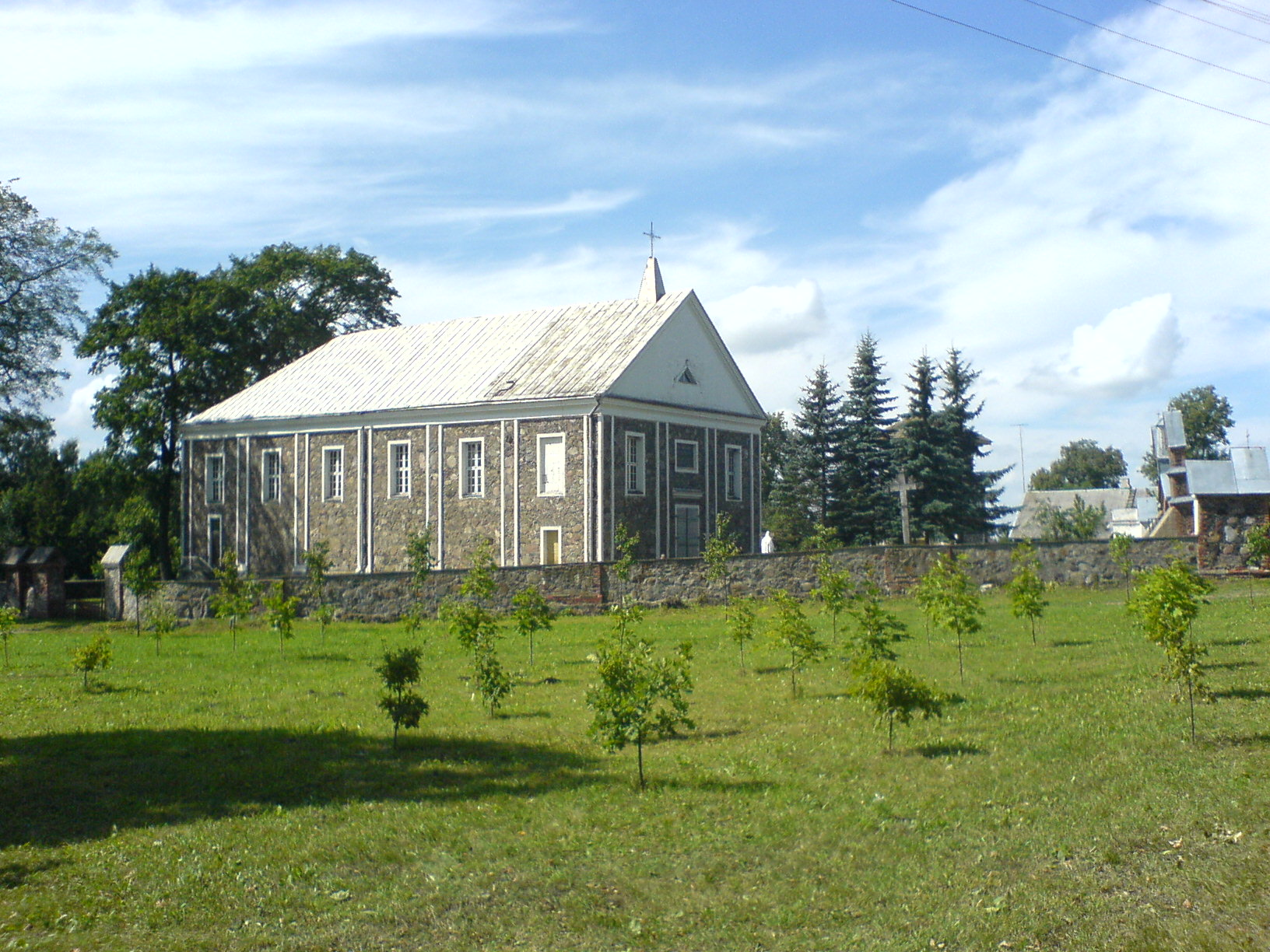
The church of Pabaiskas town
