= Petras Mantigirdaitis =

Lithuanian noble (died 1459)

Petras Mantigirdaitis (Polish: Piotr Montygerdowicz; died 1459) was an influential Lithuanian noble that was the Grand Marshal of Lithuania (1434–59).

Mantigirdaitis was one of the sons of Mangirdas, regent of Polotsk. He was first mentioned in the 1413 Union of Horodło where he received the Wadwicz coat of arms. In 1422–23 he was Grand Duke's marshal. Around 1424 he became regent of Podolia, but lost this post in 1426. He was regent of Navahrudak (1430–32 and 1445–56) and Polotsk (1459). He supported the 1432 coup against Švitrigaila and commanded troops of Sigismund Kęstutaitis in the Lithuanian Civil War (1431–35). He was also sent on several diplomatic missions: in 1430, 1432, 1448 to the Kingdom of Poland, in 1431 to the Golden Horde, in 1444 to the Teutonic Knights.

Mantigirdaitis was married twice. The name or origin of the first wife is unknown; they had one son Jonas, who was not active in politics and possibly died young. His second wife was Anna, daughter of Feodor, son of Kaributas and grandson of Grand Duke Algirdas. This marriage was childless. His main estate was in Iwye in present-day Grodno Region, Belarus (it was granted to him in 1434 by Sigismund Kęstutaitis, but it could have been a confirmation of his patrimonial rights). From his second mother-in-law he received Losk (Belarusian: Лоск) and was asked to take care of her other two daughters. Mantigirdaitis had other landholdings near Šalčininkai and Ashmyany.
