= Union of Grodno (1432) =

Series of acts of the Polish–Lithuanian union

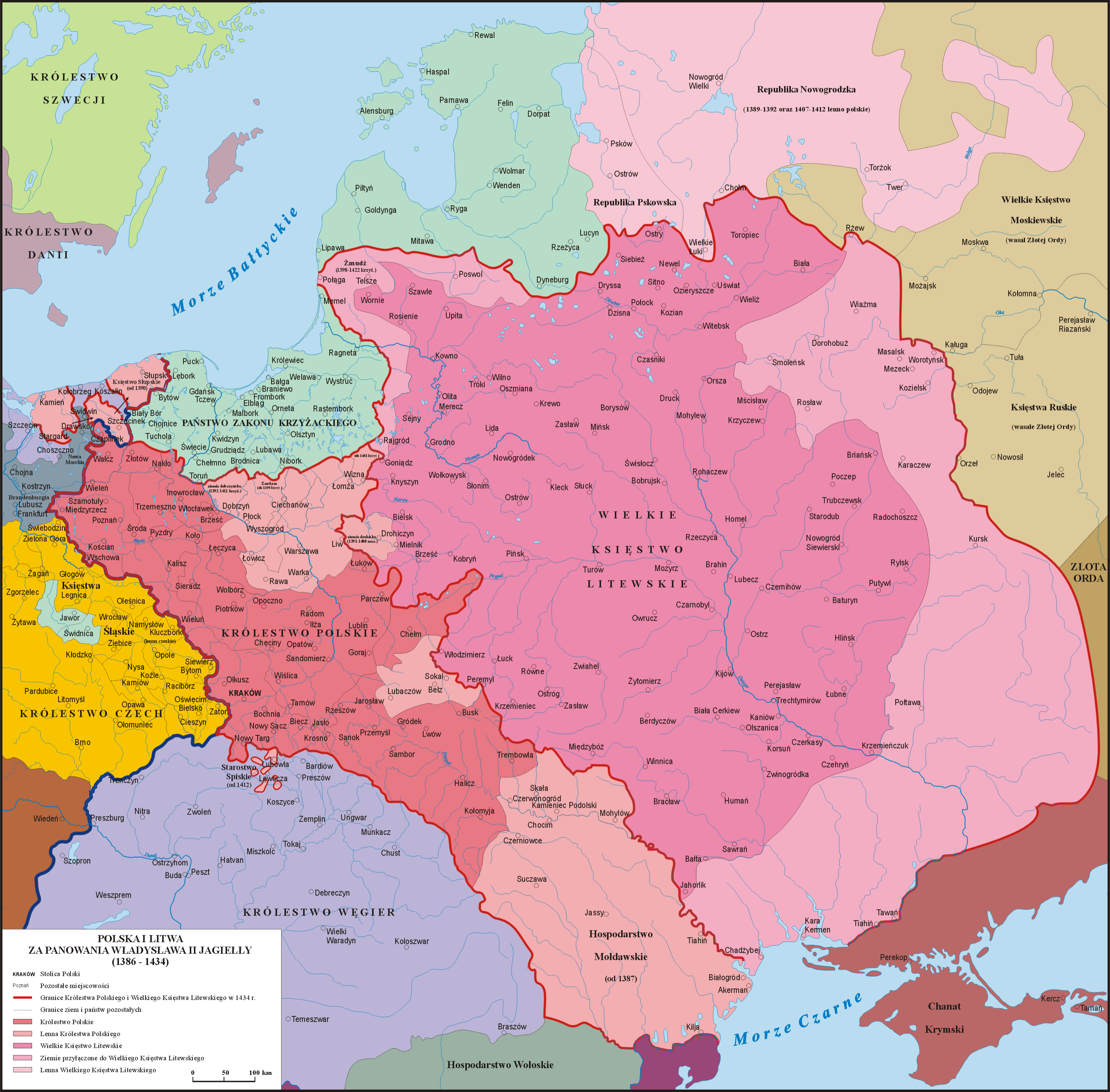
Poland and Lithuania 1386–1434

The Union of Grodno was a series of acts of the Polish–Lithuanian union between Kingdom of Poland and Grand Duchy of Lithuania. The first acts were signed in 1432 during the Lithuanian Civil War of 1432–1438. The acts confirmed the Union of Vilnius and Radom (1401). The Union established Sigismund Kęstutaitis as the Grand Duke of Lithuania and re-established Władysław II Jagiełło's seniority and dynastic interest in Lithuania.

== Background ==
After death of Vytautas in 1430, the Lithuanian nobles unilaterally selected Švitrigaila as the new Grand Duke. This violated the terms of the Union of Horodło of 1413, where Lithuanians promised not to elect a new Grand Duke without an approval from Poland. The Polish nobles were outraged and demanded that Švitrigaila acknowledged fealty to his brother Władysław II Jagiełło, King of Poland. Švitrigaila refused and the conflict grew into a civil war. In September 1431, Poland and Lithuania signed a two-year truce; however, on 31 August 1432, a group of nobles deposed Švitrigaila in support of Sigismund Kęstutaitis, brother of Vytautas. Sigismund resumed policy of union with Poland. A Polish delegation, sent to Lithuania by Władysław II Jagiełło and led by Zbigniew Oleśnicki, Bishop of Kraków, pronounced Sigismund as the Grand Duke of Lithuania for life on 30 September 1432. Sigismund swore loyalty to Poland in an act, signed in Grodno (Hrodna) on 25 October 1432. Władysław II Jagiełło confirmed both acts on 3 January 1433. Sigismund had to reconfirm his loyalty to these provisions on 20 January 1433, 27 February 1434, 6 December 1437 and 31 October 1439. Collectively all these acts are known as the Union of Grodno.

== Provisions ==
The Union established a clear lord–vassal relationship between Władysław II Jagiełło (styled dominus nostra and frater seniorus) and Sigismund (styled supremus princeps ad tempora vitae). The act in essence confirmed the Union of Vilnius and Radom (1401) and granted Sigismund the same rights as Vytautas enjoyed during his reign. After Sigismund's death, Lithuania was to return to the King of Poland; thus the Union of Grodno abandoned provisions of the Union of Horodło (1413), which envisioned that the Lithuanian nobility would elect their new Grand Duke with consent of the Polish nobles. Sigismund promised not to seek the Lithuanian crown and his son Michael Žygimantaitis had no dynastic rights to the throne of Lithuania. Thus Jagiełło's dynastic interest in Lithuania was re-established, which is explained by the fact that in 1413 he had no children, while in 1432 he had two sons (Władysław III and Casimir IV). Sigismund also made territorial concessions to Poland, which received contested Podolia and part of Volhynia (except for Lutsk and Volodymyr-Volynskyi). After Sigismund's death entire Volhynia was to unconditionally pass to Poland.

== Aftermath ==
In 1435 Sigismund won the decisive Battle of Wiłkomierz thus ending the Lithuanian Civil War of 1431–1435. He established himself in Lithuania and began distancing from pro-Polish policies. Sigismund took advantage of dynastic struggle between the Jagiellons and the Habsburg dynasty over the Kingdom of Bohemia in 1437–1438 and attempted to form an anti-Polish coalition with the Teutonic Knights. The plan failed and Sigismund was forced to re-confirm the Union of Grodno in 1437 and 1439. Despite the declarations, after Sigismund's murder in 1440, the Lithuanians unilaterally elected Casimir IV Jagiellon as their Grand Duke. The union between Poland and Lithuania was broken until 1447, when Casimir also became King of Poland.
