= Siege of Christmemel =

Coordinates: 55°06′N 22°54′E

- Part of the Lithuanian Crusade
Date	Autumn 1315
Location	Christmemel
Result	Lithuanian retreat

Belligerents
Grand Duchy of Lithuania	Teutonic Knights

Commanders and leaders
Vytenis	

The siege of Christmemel was an unsuccessful siege of the Teutonic Knights' castle of Christmemel by the Grand Duchy of Lithuania in autumn 1315.

Christmemel was an Ordensburg fortress made of earth and timber built on the Neman River in 1313 to serve as a base for attacks into Samogitia. Along with Ragnit and Georgenburg, Christmemel also served to protect the Order's possessions in Sambia from attack.

A force of Samogitians raided Ragnit in August 1315, although they did not attempt to capture the castle's keep. Six weeks later, Grand Duke Vytenis attacked with two siege machines and a number of East Slavic archers. His men began cutting and stacking wood, as Vytenis intended to set fire to the castle and suffocate the garrison. While the Order's Grand Master Karl von Trier prepared a relief force, he sent ten knights and 150 soldiers aboard ships to aid the garrison, but Vytenis sent his own men to prevent these reinforcements from arriving at Christmemel.

When Karl von Trier's relief force arrived on the 17th day of the siege, Vytenis, although he felt his forces were not ready, ordered the Lithuanian infantry to place the wood and straw around the castle and set them alight, while his Slavic archers provided covering fire. However, Christmemel's garrison was defended by crenellations, allowing the Germans to repulse the Lithuanians with crossbow fire. Defeated at the castle walls and facing Karl von Trier's army, the Grand Duke called a retreat and burned his siege engines. The battle at Christmemel was the last time the Teutonic Knights encountered Vytenis; according to a fictitious legend, he was struck down by lightning in 1316.
