= Skirsnemunė =

- Town
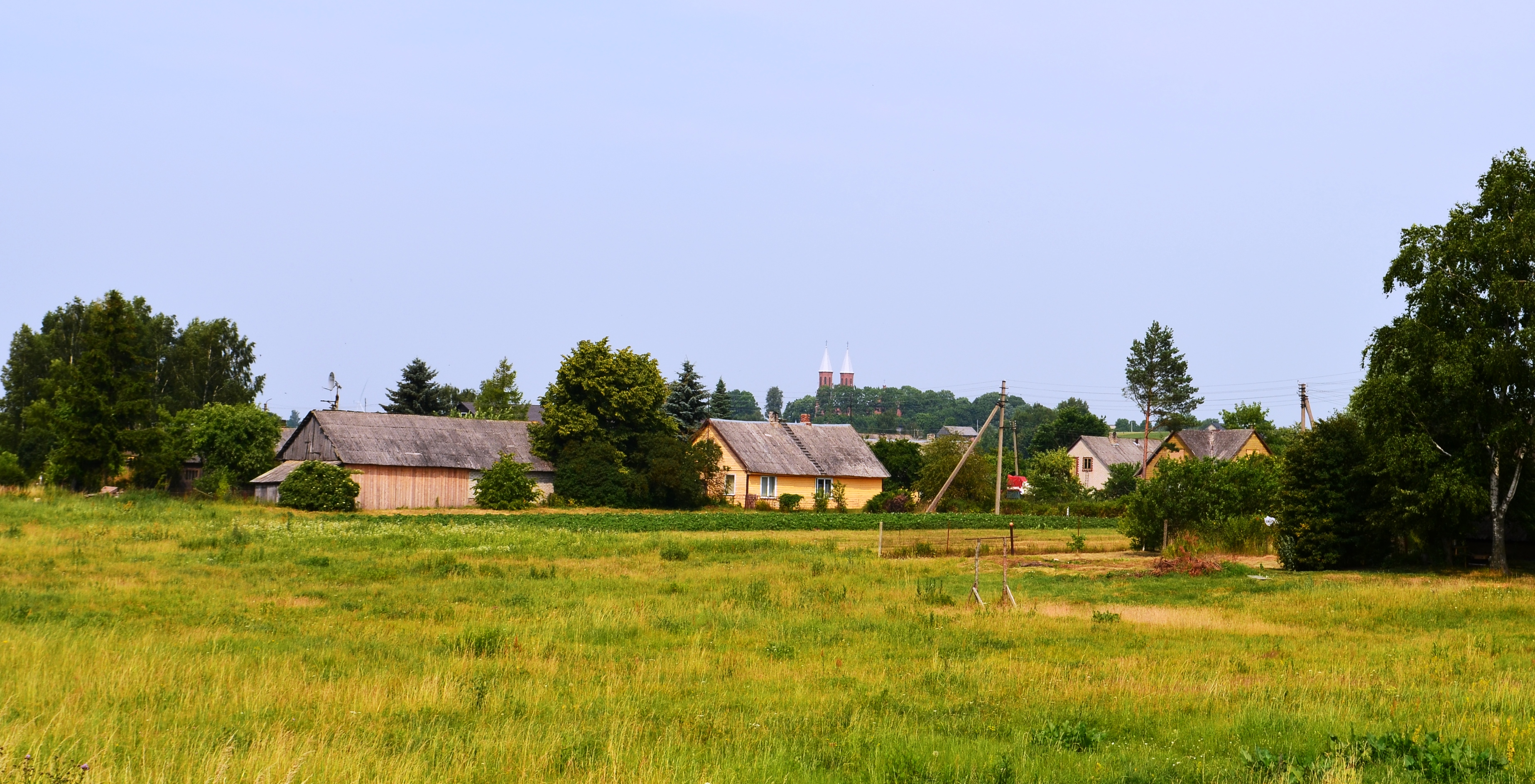

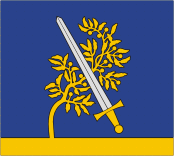
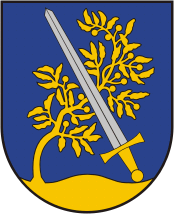
- Flag Coat of arms

- Location in Lithuania
- Coordinates: 55°06′N 22°54′E
- Country: Lithuania
- County: Tauragė County
- Municipality: Jurbarkas district municipality
- Eldership: Skirsnemunė eldership
- Capital of: Skirsnemunė eldership

Population (2011)
  - Total: 772
- Time zone: UTC+2 (EET)
  - Summer (DST): UTC+3 (EEST)

Skirsnemunė is a town in Jurbarkas district municipality, Tauragė County, Lithuania. It is situated on the Neman River about 9 km from Jurbarkas. According to the 2011 census, it had 772 residents. The town traces it history to Christmemel, a fortress built by the Teutonic Knights on a nearby hill fort in 1313. The fortress was abandoned in 1328. The town church was funded by the last will of Mykolas, son of Jonas Kęsgaila, in 1523. Skirsnemunė received Magdeburg rights in 1792.

== Gallery ==
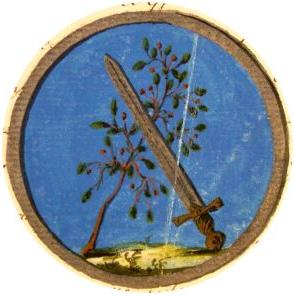
Coat of arms (1792)

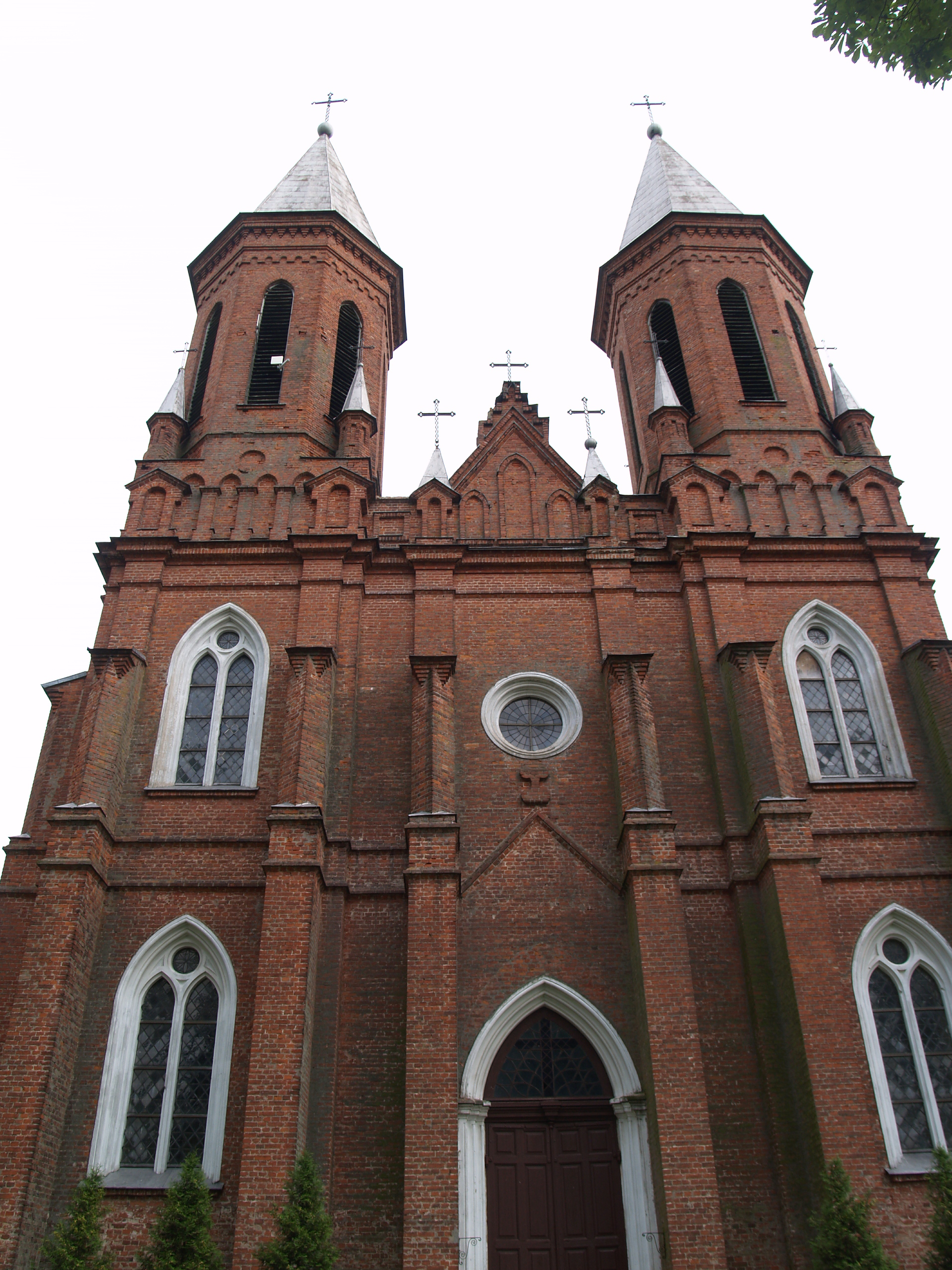
St. George's Church

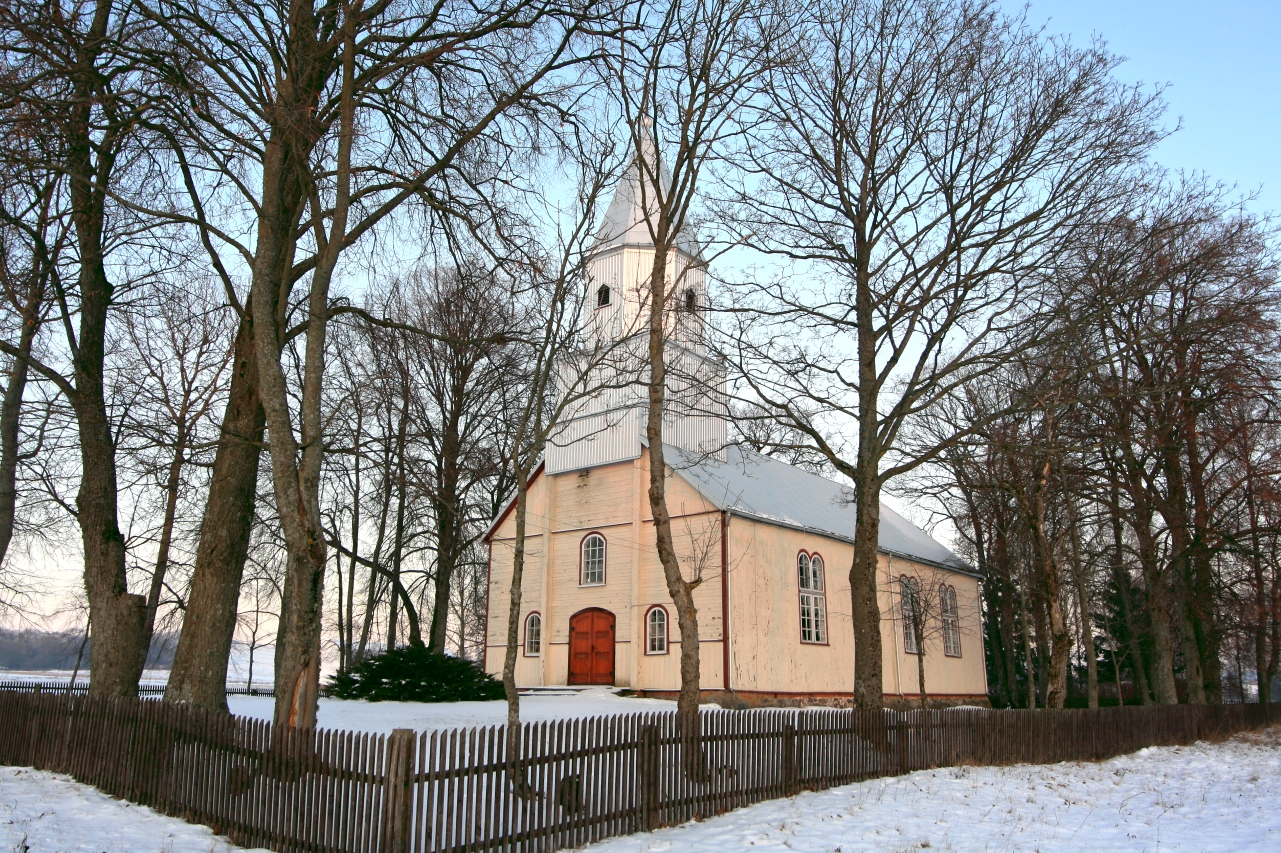
Skirsnemunė Evangelical Lutheran Church
