= Christmemel =

Coordinates: 55°05′07″N 22°54′10″E

Christmemel (Latin: Christi Memela, Kyrsmemel, Kirsmomela) was a frontier fortress (Ordensburg) of the Teutonic Knights on the banks of the Neman River. It was constructed of wood and earth between April 8 and 22, 1313, by Grand Master Karl von Trier. Christmemel, manned by some 400 men, was to serve as a base for further attacks during the Lithuanian Crusade against pagan Samogitia and Grand Duchy of Lithuania.

During the construction, the Knights used ships to build a bridge across the Neman River. After the construction, the Knights attacked a nearby Lithuanian fortress in Bisenė, but did not manage to take it. On September 15, 1315, Lithuanian grand duke Vytenis laid siege of Christmemel. He used siege machines and employed Slavic archers. However, the 17-day siege was unsuccessful and was lifted a day before Teutonic reinforcements arrived. The Knights attacked a Lithuanian fortress in Junigėda instead and used captives to rebuild Christmemel. The siege was the last engagement of Vytenis, who probably died in 1316. In 1316, some 80 men from the Christmemel garrison attacked 80 Lithuanian men returning from Bisenė. All Lithuanians, except five, were killed.

In July 1324, about 400 Lithuanians attempted to attack the fortress by surprise. However, a local resident alerted the garrison. The Lithuanians were trapped and defeated, their leader was killed, and they hastily retreated. German chronicler Peter von Dusburg recorded an act of pagan loyalty: when the Lithuanians returned to the castle to claim the corpse of their leader, they were met with volleys of Teutonic arrows. Despite heavy casualties, the pagans managed to take away the body. In 1328, Christmemel was abandoned and the garrison was transferred to the Klaipėda Castle. Peter von Dusburg claimed that the fortress was damaged by "shaking earth", which could be erosion or mudslide.

The exact location of Christmemel is unknown. Most historians identify the fortress with a former hill fort near Skirsnemunė. This would place the fortress on the right bank of the Neman River – the Lithuanian side of the natural front line. Remains of that hill fort were washed away in 1946 during spring floods. Later the town of Skirsnemunė developed near the location, allowing it to claim Teutonic heritage. Other suggested locations included Mastaičiai (Šakiai district) and Panemunė Castle.
