= Peace of Brześć Kujawski =

1435 peace treaty between Poland and the Teutonic Order

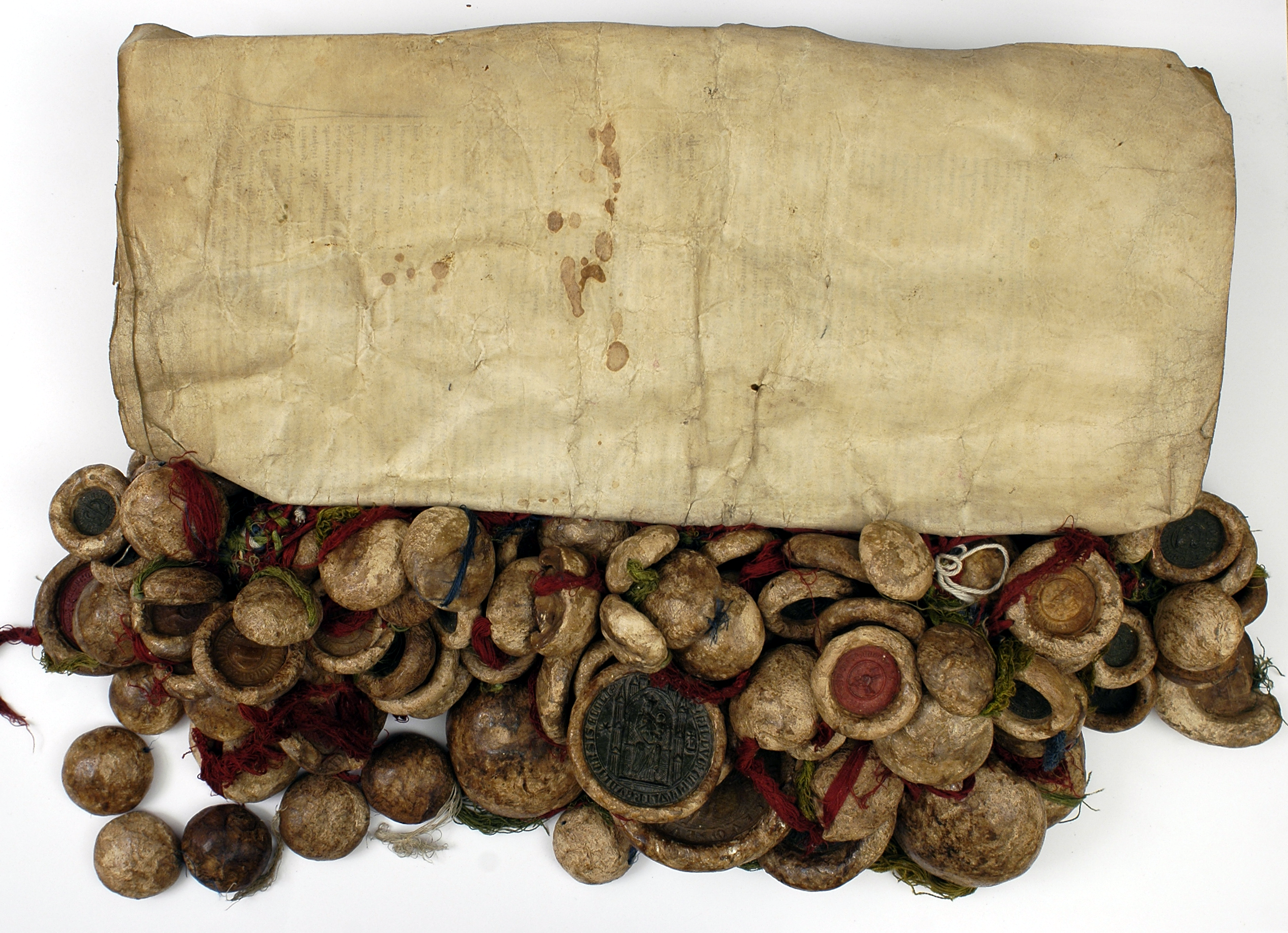
- Peace treaty
- Type: Peace treaty
- Signed: 31 December 1435
- Location: Brześć Kujawski, Poland
- Parties: Kingdom of Poland; Grand Duchy of Lithuania; State of the Teutonic Order

Peace of Brześć Kujawski was a peace treaty signed on December 31, 1435, in Brześć Kujawski that ended the Polish–Teutonic War (1431–1435). The treaty was signed in the aftermath of the Livonian Order's defeat at the hands of the allied Polish-Lithuanian force in the Battle of Wiłkomierz. The Teutonic Knights agreed to cease their support to Švitrigaila (who tried to break the Polish-Lithuanian union) and in the future to support only Grand Dukes properly elected jointly by Poland and Lithuania. The treaty did not change borders determined by the Treaty of Melno in 1422. The Peace of Brześć Kujawski showed that Teutonic Knights lost their universal missionary status. Teutonic and Livonian Order no longer interfered with Polish–Lithuanian affairs; instead Poland and Lithuania involved themselves in the Thirteen Years' War, the civil war in Prussia that tore it in half.

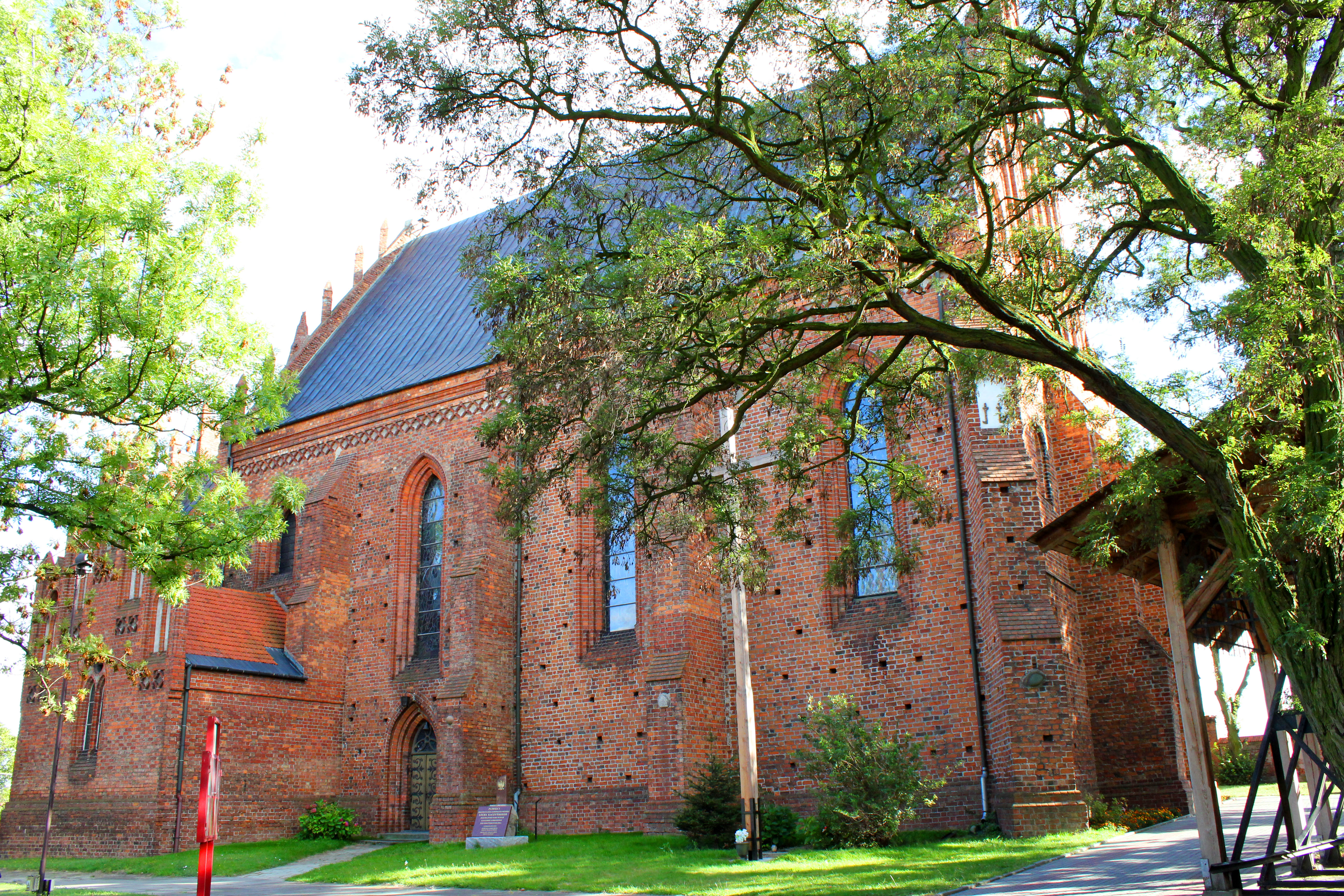
Saint Stanislaus church in Brześć Kujawski, where the treaty was announced

The treaty also eliminated the possibility of appealing against the treaty to the Pope or Holy Roman Emperor.

The treaty was announced in the Gothic Saint Stanislaus church in Brześć Kujawski.
