= Truce of Łęczyca =

1433 treaty between Poland and the Teutonic Order

- Type: Ceasefire
- Signed: 15 December 1433
- Location: Łęczyca, Poland
- Parties: Kingdom of Poland State of the Teutonic Order

The Truce of Łęczyca was signed during the Polish–Teutonic War (1431–1435) between the Kingdom of Poland and the Teutonic Order in Łęczyca on 15 December 1433 (this has also led some Polish historians to divide this Polish–Teutonic War into two wars, in 1431–1433 and in 1435). The Teutonic Knights, pressured by the citizens of their lands, agreed to the 12-year-old truce to other Polish demands, including that the Order would cease support to Švitrigaila (a Lithuanian noble who attempted to break the Polish-Lithuanian union with the aid of the Order); in addition each side would control the territories it occupied until a peace would be signed (uti possidetis), and no party would seek mediation of foreign powers to change this truce. This marked the end of the war on Polish territories; the struggle on Lithuanian lands would continue for two more years (as the truce with Poland did not extend to the Livonian Order).
