= Brześć Kujawski =

Town in Kuyavian-Pomeranian Voivodeship, Poland

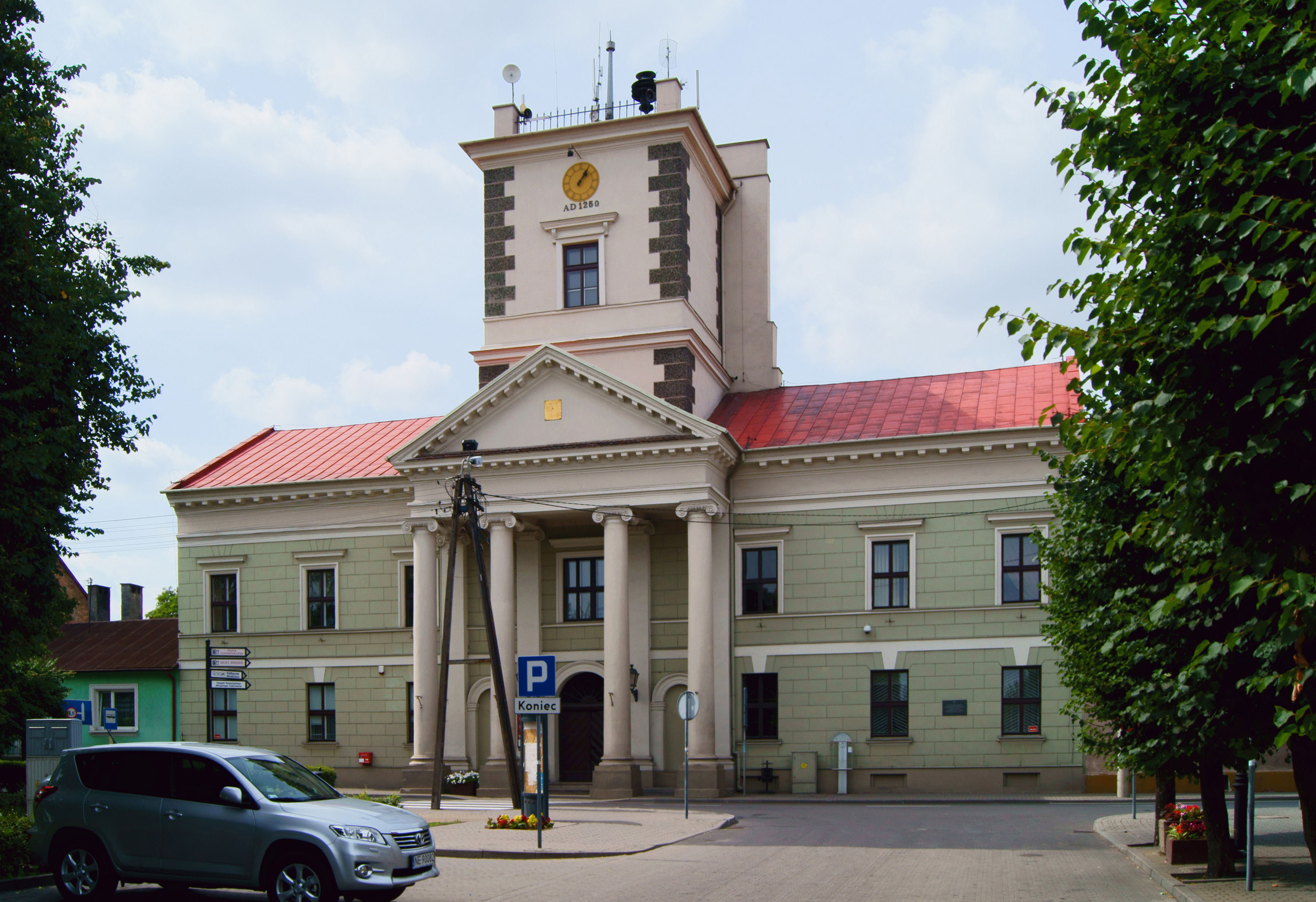
- Town hall designed by Enrico Marconi

- Flag Coat of arms

- Location within Poland
- Coordinates: 52°36′18″N 18°53′53″E
- Country: Poland
- Voivodeship: Kuyavian-Pomeranian
- County: Włocławek
- Gmina: Brześć Kujawski
- First mentioned: 1228
- Town rights: before 1250

Area
  - Total: 7.04 km^{2} (2.72 sq mi)

Population (31 December 2021)
  - Total: 4,527
  - Density: 643/km^{2} (1,670/sq mi)
- Time zone: UTC+1 (CET)
  - Summer (DST): UTC+2 (CEST)
- Postal code: 87-880
- Vehicle registration: CWL
- Website: Office website

Brześć Kujawski (Polish pronunciation: [ˈbʐɛɕt͡ɕ kuˈjafskʲi]) (Note: Yiddish: Brisk) is a town in the Kuyavian-Pomeranian Voivodeship in central Poland. As of December 2021, the town has a population of 4,527. It is situated on the Zgłowiączka River.

Brześć Kujawski was the seat of a local line of the Piast dynasty, from which hailed King Władysław I Łokietek, and then, for over 400 years, it served as a regional capital in Poland. It is one of the historic capitals of the region of Kuyavia. It contains a market square, a typical feature of many medieval European towns, and its landmarks include medieval Gothic churches.

== Etymology ==
The name Brześć comes from the word Brzost, which is a species of elm that the area was originally covered in, while the name Kujawski is derived from the region of Kuyavia and was assigned to distinguish the town from Brześć Litewski, now capital of the Brest Region of Belarus.

== History ==
=== Prehistory and antiquity ===
The earliest traces of Brześć Kujawski date back to Neolithic settlements. Ancient Roman coins – denarii of emperors Trajan, Hadrian and Marcus Aurelius – have been found within the town limits.

=== Ducal seat and regional capital ===
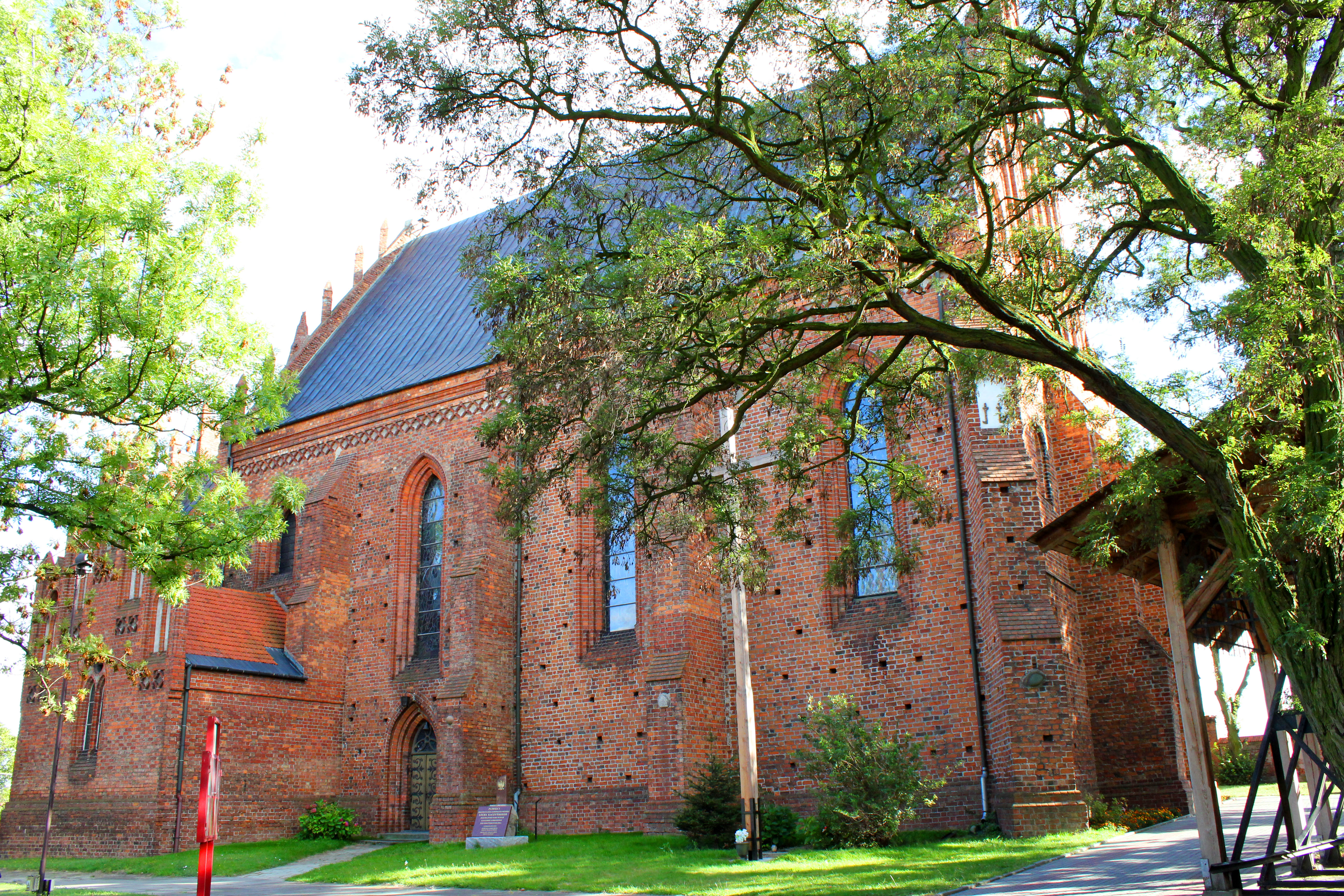
Gothic Saint Stanislaus church

In the thirteenth century the area became of significant importance as it was the site of a stronghold that was the seat of the Dukes of Kuyavia. Brześć was a part of fragmented Piast-ruled Poland, initially located in the Duchy of Masovia, then the Duchy of Kuyavia from 1236, and from 1267 it was the capital of a small eponymous duchy and the seat of its duke, Władysław I the Elbow-high, who later reunited most Polish duchies and was crowned King of Poland in 1320. Brześć was granted town rights by Duke Casimir I of Kuyavia before 1250, and was vested with various privileges by Władysław I the Elbow-high in 1292, 1295 and 1297.

The earliest written mention of the town dates back to 23 April 1228, when a ceremony took place in Brześć granting the land to the Teutonic Order by Konrad I of Masovia. It was a temporary deal, which included four villages and the Dybów Castle. However, the relationship quickly deteriorated, leaving a significant impact on the people of Brześć as well as the surrounding lands. On 10 February 1321, a Papal verdict was announced in Brześć, which ordered the Teutonic Knights to return the coastal region of Gdańsk Pomerania to Poland, which they annexed and occupied since 1308. The Teutonic Knights rejected the verdict and in 1332, during the next Polish–Teutonic War, also invaded and occupied Brześć, which was restored to Poland in the Treaty of Kalisz (1343). Despite this, Brześć remained under the threat of raids for nearly 100 years, which occurred several times, even after the Polish victory at the Battle of Grunwald in 1410. The last time the Crusaders laid siege to Brześć was in 1431 without winning it this time.

Throughout the period of Polish–Teutonic wars, Polish kings often visited the city either during fights of peace talks. The Polish–Teutonic War of 1431–1435 was ended with the signing of the Peace of Brześć Kujawski. The Thirteen Years' War, the longest of Polish–Teutonic wars, was not fought in the region, however King Casimir IV Jagiellon often stayed in the town at that time.

Since the 14th century, Brześć was a royal city of the Polish Crown and capital of the Brześć Voivodeship, which, after the Union of Lublin (1569), was renamed Brześć Kujawski Voivodeship. King Casimir III the Great expanded the royal castle in Brześć in the 14th century. In 1496 Brześć was designated the location of the voivodeship's sejmik (provincial assembly). Various Polish Kings vested the town with multiple privileges in 1361, 1410, 1504, 1556, 1557, 1576, 1582, 1593, 1596, 1681, 1720, 1781, 1782, 1787 and 1793, and it was in Brześć that King Casimir III the Great granted the nearby major city of Bydgoszcz its city rights in 1346.

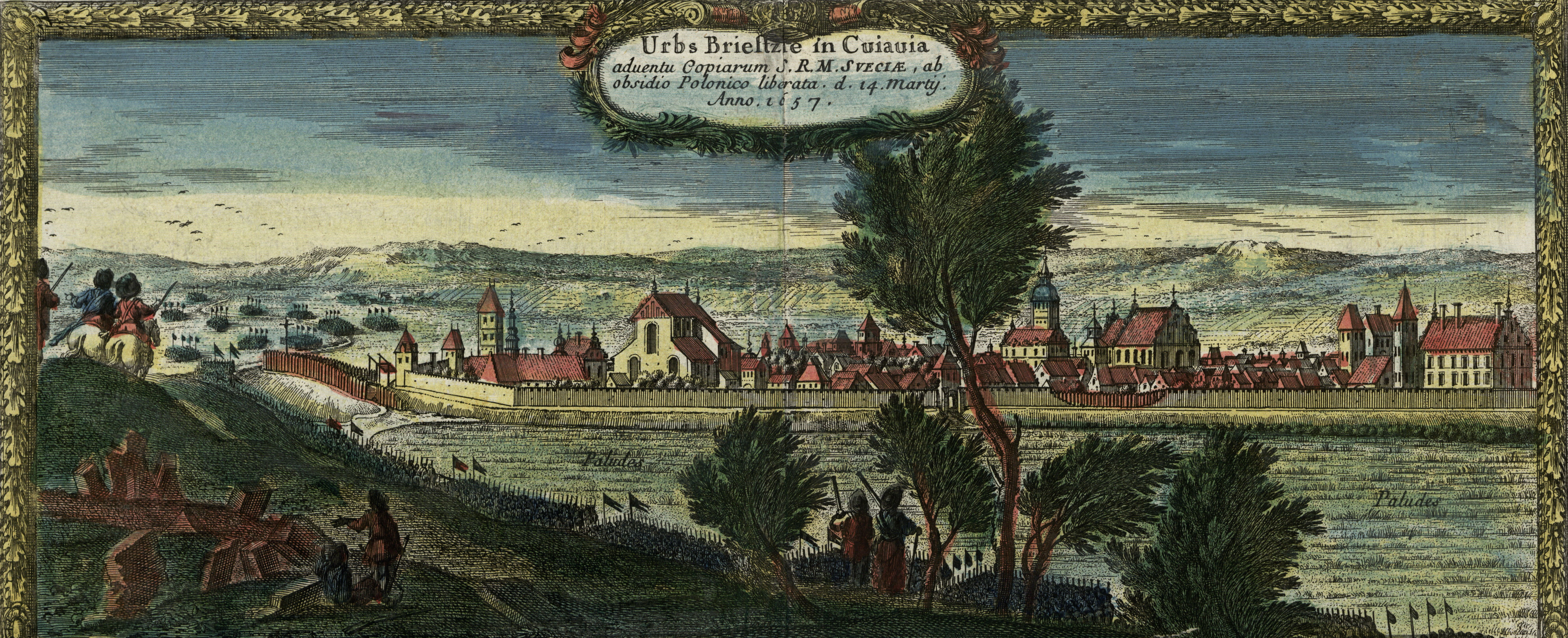
Panorama of Brześć Kujawski from 1657 (by Erik Dahlberg)

Brześć was an important and thriving city, and in the sixteenth and seventeenth centuries it was the center of grain trade, however it declined after Swedish invasions of 1655–1660 and 1701–1706. On 23 April 1782, King Stanisław August Poniatowski granted a privilege to the town's Jewish population that allowed them to build houses on a street specifically for those of the Jewish religion.

=== Late modern period ===
The city was annexed by Prussia in the Second Partition of Poland in 1793, followed by rule of the short-lived Polish Duchy of Warsaw from 1807, and in 1815 it became part of so-called Congress Poland, soon forcibly integrated into the Russian Empire. It was restored to Poland after the country regained independence in 1918. According to the 1921 census, the population of the town with the adjacent industrial settlement was 84.4% Polish and 15.5% Jewish.

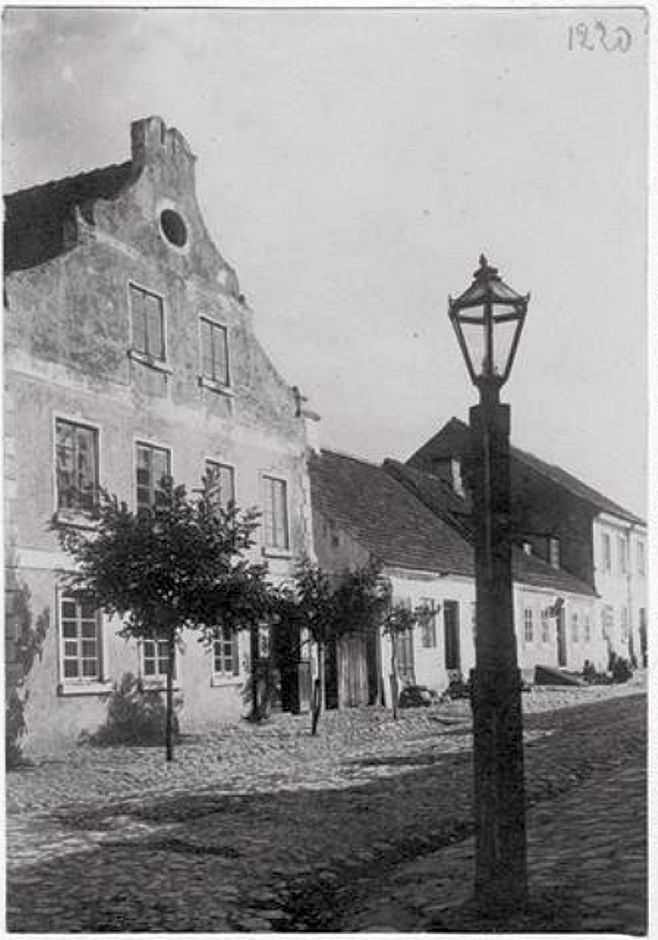
Brześć Kujawski in the early 20th century

=== World War II ===
During the German invasion of Poland, which started World War II, in September 1939, the town was quickly overrun by the Wehrmacht, and then under German occupation it was renamed Brest-Kujawien (1939–1942). In February 1940, the Germans expelled 300 Poles, owners of bigger and better houses, which then were handed over to German colonists as part of the Lebensraum policy, while Poles were deported in freight trains to the General Government. Local Polish parish priest Stefan Kuliński was arrested by the Germans in 1941, deported to the Dachau concentration camp, and then murdered in a gas chamber in the Hartheim Euthanasia Centre in 1942. Nevertheless, the Polish underground resistance movement was active in the town.

== Demographics ==
Historical population

Year	Pop.	±%
1897	2,744	—
1910	3,133	+14.2%
1921	3,818	+21.9%
1931	5,837	+52.9%

Year	Pop.	±%
1950	4,450	−23.8%
1960	4,450	+0.0%
2010	4,603	+3.4%

== Sports ==
Łokietek Brześć Kujawski sports club, named after King Władysław I the Elbow-high (Polish: Władysław I Łokietek), is based in the town, with football, athletics, volleyball and boxing sections.

== Transport ==
Brześć Kujawski lies on national road 62. National road 62 connects it to Włocławek to the east and to Radziejów to the west.

The nearest railway station is in Włocławek.
