= Staryi Chortoryisk =

Staryi Chortoryisk Старий Чорторийськ Czartorysk • Stary Czartorysk
- Village
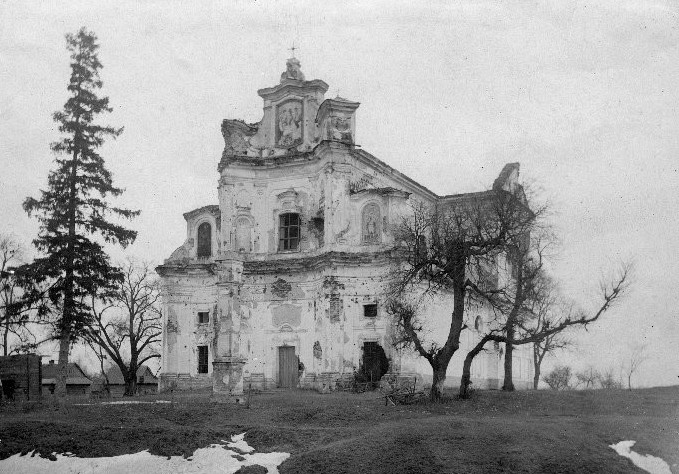
- Ruins of the Dominican (Catholic) Church, now the Holy Cross Orthodox Cathedral

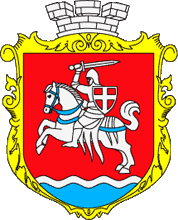
- Coat of arms

- Location within Volyn Oblast Location within Ukraine
- Coordinates: 51°13′27″N 25°52′57″E
- Country: Ukraine
- Oblast: Volyn
- Raion: Kamin-Kashyrskyi Raion
- Hromada: Manevychi settlement hromada
- Founded: 1100

Area
  - Total: 2,550 km^{2} (980 sq mi)

Population
  - Total: 1,829
- Website: Ukrainian Parliament website

Staryi Chortoryisk (Ukrainian: Старий Чорторийськ, translit. Staryi Chortoryis'k, Polish: Czartorysk) is a village (selo) in north-western Ukraine. It is located on the bank of the Styr River in the Kamin-Kashyrskyi Raion of Volyn Oblast.

One of the most ancient settlements of Volhynia, Chortoriysk (or Chertoryesk) was first mentioned in 1100 in the Hypatian Chronicle, where it was recorded as having been passed to Prince David Igorevych (or Davyd Ihorevych) of Volhynia (1087-1099), together with Dubno, Busk and Ostroh. . In the 13th century, it was claimed by the rulers of Pinsk, who built a tower in Chortoryisk resembling the Bela Vezha in Kamieniec. By the end of the 14th century, the town had become the seat of Algirdas's son Constantine (from whose son, Vasili Konstantinovich, the well-known Polish family of Czartoryski is descended).

On 26 August 1431 a truce was signed at Chortoryisk between the forces of Poland and Lithuania, bringing to an end the brief Lutsk War between the two.

The current village of Staryi Chortoryisk was established in 1900, in place of the ancient settlement. Staryi Chortoryisk was site of a major battle between the Russian and German army in World War I. In both October 1915 and May 1919, there were major encounters between the two sides. Staryi Chortoryisk had a large Jewish population until World War I, when most of them fled to escape the fighting between the German and Russian army.

Among the prominent natives is the economist Rose Friedman (wife of Nobel Prize winner economist Milton Friedman), along with her brother, Law Professor Aaron Director who left for Oregon in the U.S.A. around 1913. The Directors were prominent members of the Jewish community in Staryi Chortoryisk . In addition, the Rubin (formerly Rabin) family is from Staryi Chortoryisk. The Polish playwright Franciszka Urszula Radziwiłłowa was born in Staryi Chortoryisk.

The village's main landmark is the church of the Blackfriars, built in the Baroque style in 1741 to replace an earlier church from 1639.
