= Battle of Wiłkomierz =

1435 battle of the Lithuanian Civil War (1432–1438)

- Part of the Lithuanian Civil War (1432–1438)
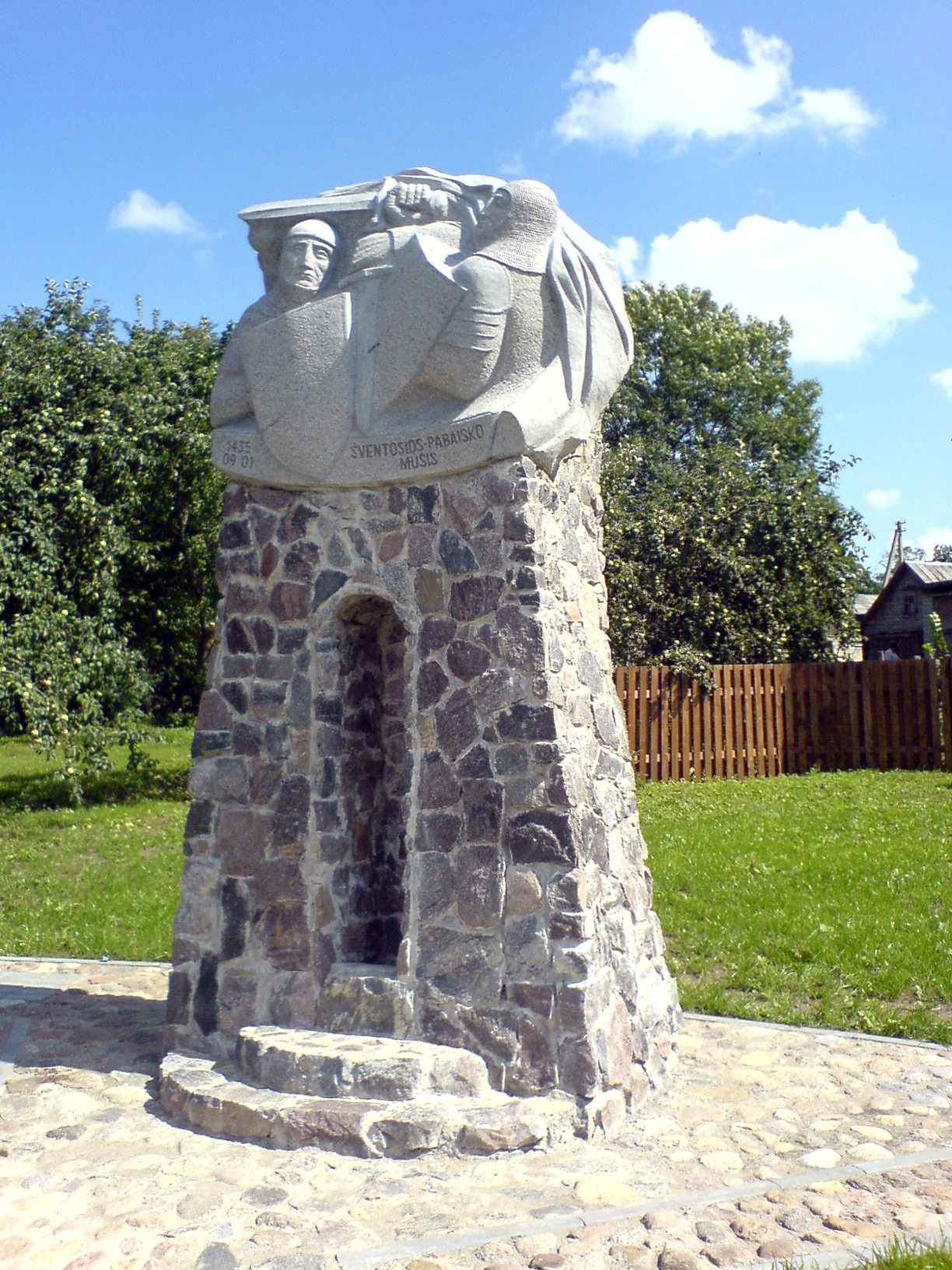
- Monument at the field of the Battle of Wiłkomierz
Date	September 1, 1435
Location	Ukmergė near the Šventoji River 55°9′57″N 24°46′17″E
Result	Victory of Sigismund Kęstutaitis

Belligerents
Eastern Grand Duchy of Lithuania (Polotsk, Vitebsk, Smolensk, Kiev, Volhynia); Livonian Order; Golden Horde	Western Grand Duchy of Lithuania (Samogitia, Podlaskie, Hrodna, Minsk); Kingdom of Poland

Commanders and leaders
Švitrigaila; Franco Kerskorff †; Sigismund Korybut †	Sigismund Kęstutaitis; Michael Žygimantaitis; Jakub Kobylański

Strength
11,000 (contemporary exaggeration: 30,000)	9,500 (contemporary exaggeration: 30,000)

The Battle of Wiłkomierz (see other names) took place on September 1, 1435, near Ukmergė in the Grand Duchy of Lithuania. With the help of military units from the Kingdom of Poland, the forces of Grand Duke Sigismund Kęstutaitis soundly defeated Švitrigaila and his Livonian allies. The battle was a decisive engagement of the Lithuanian Civil War (1432–1438). Švitrigaila lost most of his supporters and withdrew to southern Grand Duchy; he was slowly pushed out and eventually made peace. The damage inflicted upon the Livonian Order has been compared to the damage of Battle of Grunwald upon the Teutonic Order. It was fundamentally weakened and ceased to play a major role in Lithuanian affairs. The battle can be seen as the final engagement of the Lithuanian Crusade.

== Names ==
The battle is also known as the Battle of Vilkomir or Ukmergė after Ukmergė/Vilkmergė, the nearest large settlement. It is also known as Battle of Święta/Šventoji after the Šventoji River that flows near the battle site. In Lithuanian, the battle is known as the Battle of Pabaiskas. The word "pabaiskas" is derived from Polish "pobojowisko" literally meaning "battle site" or "place where a battle was fought". It came into use as a name for the town of Pabaiskas which grew around the Church of the Holy Trinity built at the site in 1436–40 by Sigismund Kęstutaitis.

== Background ==
In October 1430, Vytautas the Great died without an heir. The Lithuanian nobles elected Švitrigaila, Jogaila's brother and Vytautas' cousin, as the new Grand Duke without first consulting with Poland. This violated the Union of Horodło of 1413, and outraged the Polish nobles. Švitrigaila prepared for war and enlisted the Teutonic Knights, Moldavia, and the Golden Horde as his allies. Sigismund Kęstutaitis assumed power in Lithuania when he deposed Švitrigaila in a coup on August 31, 1432. Švitrigaila escaped, established himself in Polotsk, and rallied his supporters from Slavic lands of the Grand Duchy against Sigismund.

The Teutonic Knights secretly supported Švitrigaila chiefly through its branch in Livonia. Švitrigaila and Sigismund were now engaged in a destructive civil war. In December 1432, their armies fought in the Battle of Ashmyany; Švitrigaila was defeated, but the victory was not decisive. In 1433, together with the Livonian knights, Švitrigaila raided Lida, Kreva, Eišiškės and devastated the surrounding areas near Vilnius, Trakai, and Kaunas. After Jogaila's death in 1434, the Teutonic Knights resumed their war against Poland. In total, Švitrigaila and Livonia organized six raids into Lithuania, the last of which resulted in the Battle of Wiłkomierz.

== Battle ==
Švitrigaila commanded a force of about 11,000 men: Lithuanians and Orthodox Ruthenians from Polotsk, Vitebsk, Smolensk, Kiev, Volhynia, Livonian Knights and their mercenaries, at least 500 Tatars from the Golden Horde, and a few Teutonic Knights. There might have been some Hussites on his side as he enlisted his nephew Sigismund Korybut, a distinguished military leader during the Hussite Wars. Forces of Sigismund Kęstutaitis were probably smaller. His son Michael commanded Lithuanian troops from Samogitia, Podlaskie, Hrodna, Minsk, and Jakub Kobylański was in charge of Polish forces (4,000 troops).

Švitrigaila gathered his forces in Vitebsk and marched towards Braslaw where he joined with the Livonian forces on August 20. The plan was to march Trakai and Vilnius. The opponents met about 9 kilometres (5.6 mi) south of Vilkmergė. At first, the armies were separated by Lake Žirnajai and a marshy creek (Žirnaja or Vintara). The armies did not engage each other. After two days, Švitrigaila and Livonian Grand Master Franco Kerskorff decided to change their position and move north towards Vilkmergė. As the army regrouped and was separated by a rivulet, it was attacked by Sigismund Kęstutaitis. Švitrigaila's army was split in half; the first to fall was the flag of Livonian marshal Werner von Nesselrode. In the ensuing panic, Švitrigaila's army was soundly defeated.

Švitrigaila managed to escape to Polotsk with about 30 followers. Kerskorff was killed in the battle along with his marshal and several komturs. Korybut was severely wounded and captured. He died a few days later; historians speculate whether he died of the wounds, was drowned, or poisoned. Many others, including Duke Yaroslav, son of Lengvenis, and imperial envoy Sigismund de Rota, were killed. Many knights, including a reserve unit that was late to battle, were taken captive. Others drowned in the Šventoji River. The victors hunted down the survivors for 15 days.

== Aftermath ==
The battle reduced the power of the Livonian Order as its army was defeated, its Grand Master killed and of its many senior officers killed or taken prisoner. The damage to the Livonian Order caused by the battle is often compared to the consequences that the Battle of Grunwald (1410) had on the Teutonic Knights. The peace treaty was signed on December 31, 1435 in Brześć Kujawski. The Teutonic and Livonian Orders promised not to interfere in internal matters of Lithuania or Poland. According to the treaty, even the Pope or the Holy Roman Emperor could not force the Orders to violate the accords. That provision was meant particularly against Sigismund, Holy Roman Emperor, and his attempts in playing Poland and Teutonic Order against each other.

The peace did not alter borders established by the Treaty of Melno (1422). The Livonian Order's defeat in the battle brought it closer to its neighbors in Livonia. The Livonian Confederation agreement was signed on December 4, 1435, by the Livonian Order, Livonian Bishops, vassals and city representatives. The Order lost its crusading character and became a confederate state.

Švitrigaila escaped and continued to resist, but he was losing his power in the eastern provinces of the Grand Duchy of Lithuania. In 1437, he proposed a compromise to continue to rule Kiev and Volhynia, territories that still remained loyal to him, until his death, when they would pass to the King of Poland. A strong protest from Sigismund Kęstutaitis caused the Polish Senate not to ratify the agreement. The following year, Švitrigaila retreated to Moldavia. Sigismund became the undisputed Grand Duke of Lithuania. However, his reign was short as he was assassinated in 1440.

A church was built in the battlefield by Sigismund Kęstutaitis to commemorate his victory. The town of Pabaiskas later grew around the church.
