= Sigismund Kęstutaitis =

Grand Duke of Lithuania from 1432 to 1440

Sigismund I Kęstutaitis
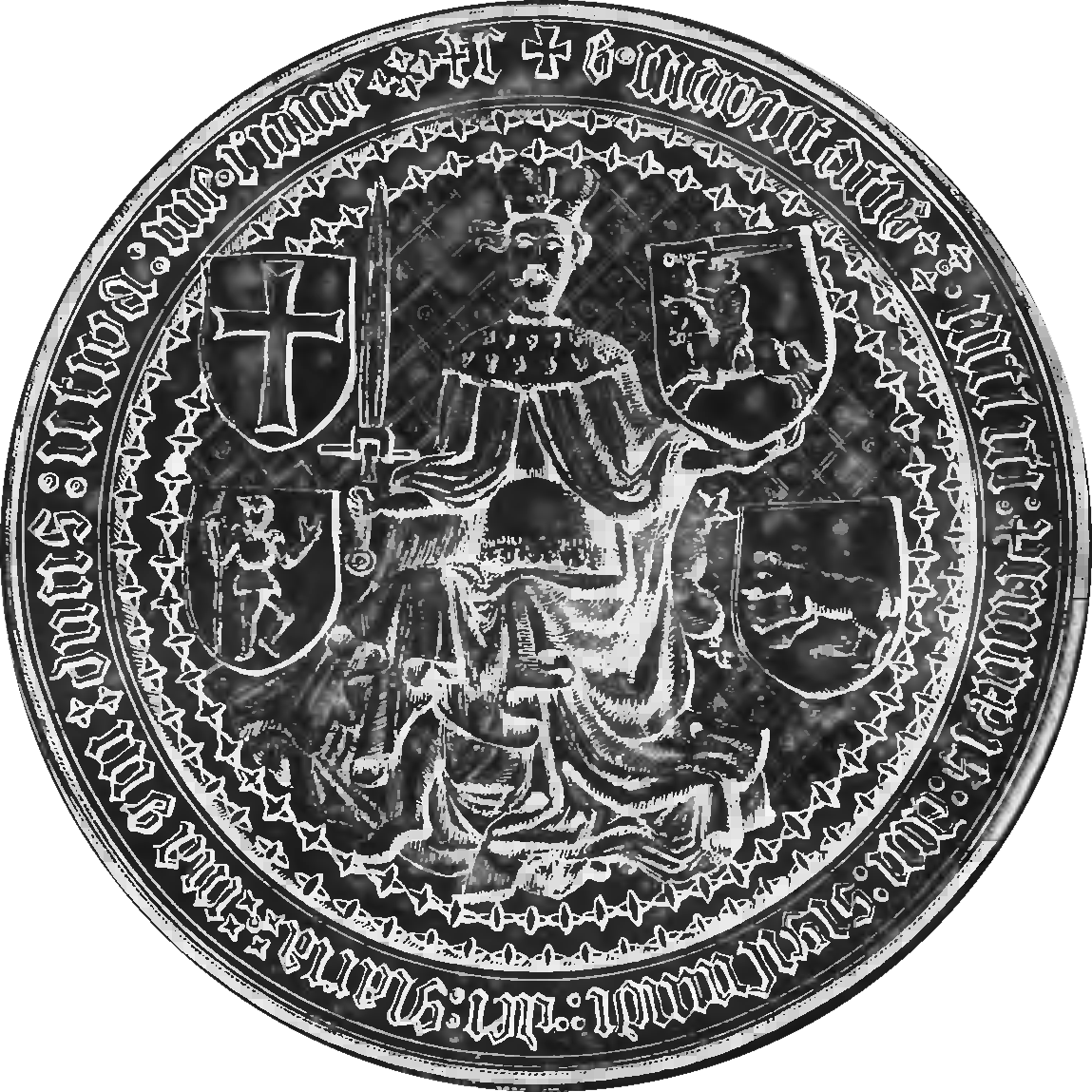
- Royal seal of Sigismund

Grand Duke of Lithuania
- Reign: 1432–1440
- Predecessor: Švitrigaila and Władysław Jagiełło
- Successor: Władysław Jagiellon and Casimir Andrew Jagiellon
- Co-ruler: Władysław Jagiełło (1432–1434); Władysław (1432–1440)
- Born: c. 1365; Trakai, Grand Duchy of Lithuania
- Died: 20 March 1440 (aged 74–75); Trakai, Grand Duchy of Lithuania
- Burial: Vilnius Cathedral
- Spouse: N Andreyevna Odintsewicz
- Issue: Michael Žygimantaitis
- Dynasty: House of Gediminas
- Father: Kęstutis
- Mother: Birutė
- Religion: Baltic religion (1365–1383); Roman Catholic (1383–1440)

Sigismund Kęstutaitis (Lithuanian: Žygimantas I Kęstutaitis, Belarusian: Жыгімонт Кейстутавіч, Polish: Zygmunt Kiejstutowicz; c. 1365 – 20 March 1440) was Grand Duke of Lithuania from 1432 to 1440. Sigismund was his baptismal name, while his pagan Lithuanian birth name is unknown. He was the son of Grand Duke Kęstutis and his wife Birutė.

== Reign ==
Reconstruction of Sigismund Kęstutaitis's seal with the Pahonia and the Cyrillic inscription "ПЕЧАТЬ КНЯЗЯ ЖИКГИМОНТА" (Seal of Prince Zhigimont), based on a 1411 document. Drawing by Marian Gumowski (1930).

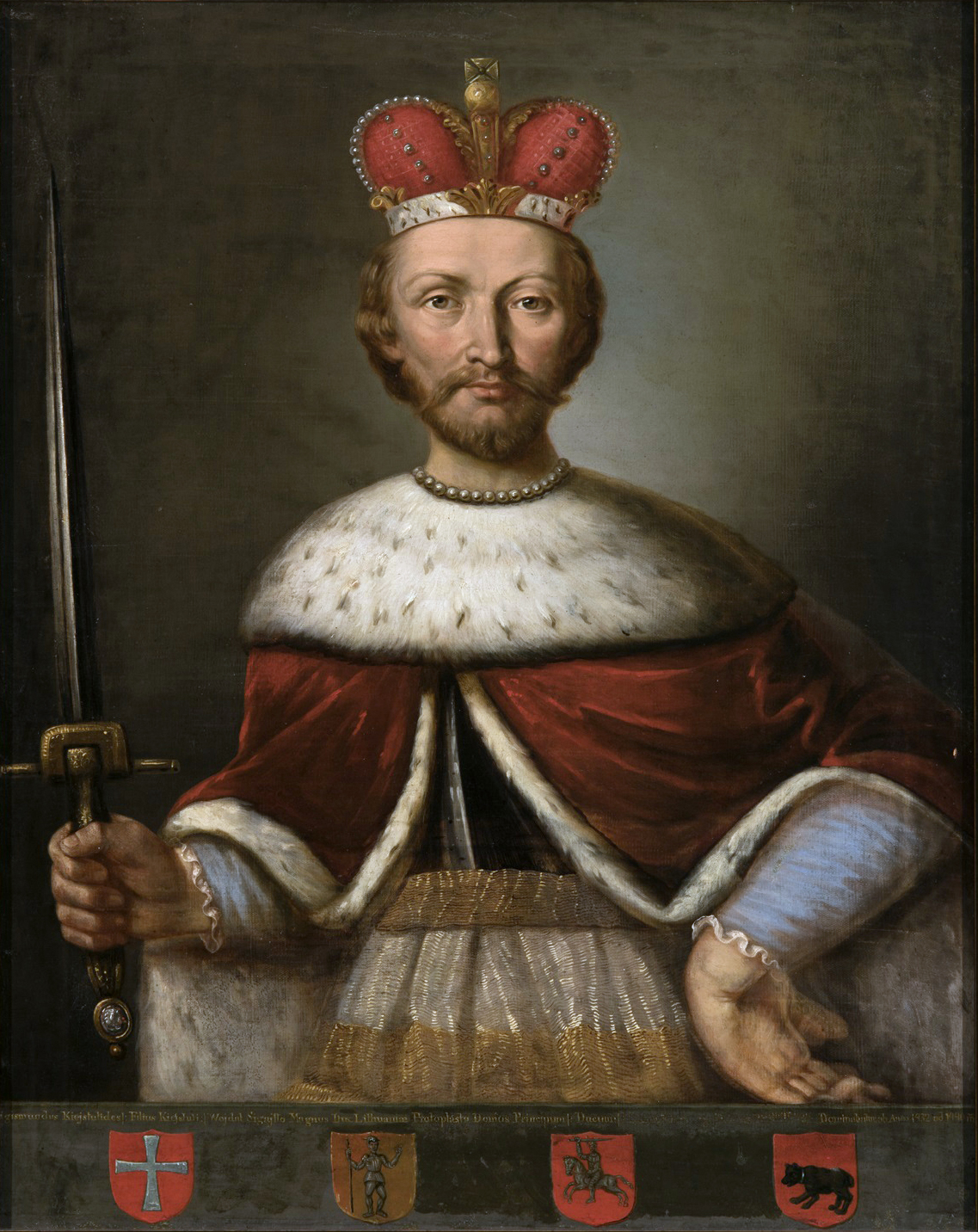
Sigismund with Gediminas' Cap, painted in the 19th century

After the death of Kęstutis, he was a prisoner of Jogaila from 1382 to 1384. Sigismund was baptized in the Catholic rite in 1383. In 1384, he escaped captivity and joined his brother Vytautas, who allied himself with the Teutonic Knights. When Vytautas allied with the Teutonic Knights for the second time to fight Skirgaila, Sigismund was a hostage of the Teutonic Knights, together with his family from 1389 to 1398. He became Duke of Navahrudak (1390–1440), and Starodub from 1406. He participated in the Battles of Vorskla and the Grunwald. After the death of Vytautas, he supported his cousin Švitrigaila in his fight against Poland, but later was convinced by nobles to join a conspiracy against him.

A seal attached to the 1411 charter for the Hieraniony church has a Cyrillic inscription: "ПЕЧАТЬ КНЯЗЯ ЖИКГИМОНТА" (Seal of Prince Zhigimont). Another seal with a similar inscription was used on the Treaty of Melno in 1422. In 1433, he wrote a letter to Jogaila in Ruthenian.

On 1 September 1432, Sigismund became Grand Duke of Lithuania. He signed the Union of Grodno with Jogaila and ceded some territories in Volhynia and Podolia to Poland. However, Švitrigaila was still active and had the support of many Eastern Orthodox nobles. In 1434, in an attempt to attract support from these nobles, he issued a privilege to nobles of Eastern Orthodox faith, making their rights equal to those of noble Roman Catholics. He guaranteed that no noble, regardless of religion, could be imprisoned or punished without a court order. The privilege was an important development and accelerated the formation of a feudal system.

Sigismund's army defeated Švitrigaila in the Battle of Wiłkomierz on 1 September 1435. The Livonian Order, an ally of Švitrigaila, suffered a major defeat. After strengthening his positions in Lithuania, he tried to loosen his ties with Poland and negotiated between 1438 and 1440 with Albert of Hungary (who was also the German king) for an anti-Polish alliance, but was killed by supporters of Švitrigaila (possibly led by Alexander Czartoryski) at the Trakai Peninsula Castle on 20 March 1440. Sigismund had one son, named Michael Žygimantaitis, who died shortly before 10 February 1452.

== See also ==
- List of heads of state of Lithuania

Sigismund Kęstutaitis Gediminids Born: ca. 1365 Died: 10 February 1440
Royal titles
Preceded by Švitrigaila and Władysław II Jagiełło	Grand Duke of Lithuania with Władysław II Jagiełło and Władysław III as Supreme Dukes; 1432 – 1440	Succeeded by Władysław III and Casimir IV Jagiellon
