= Jan Chodkiewicz =

Jan Chodkiewicz might refer to these nobles in the Grand Duchy of Lithuania:

- Jan Hieronimowicz Chodkiewicz (1537–1579), Elder of Samogitia, Grand Marshal of Lithuania
- Jan Karol Chodkiewicz (1560–1621), military commander of the Grand Ducal Lithuanian Army
- Jan Kazimierz Chodkiewicz (1616–1660), Castellan of Vilnius
- Ivan Chodkiewicz (ca. 1420–1484), Voivode of Kiev, ancestor of the Chodkiewicz family
