= Chodkiewicz coat of arms =

Polish coat of arms

Chodkiewicz
- Alternative name: Kościesza odm. Chodkiewicz
- Divisions: Gmina Gródek, Gródek
- Families: 1 names Chodkiewicz (Chodźkiewicz)

Chodkiewicz (Gryf z Mieczem) is a Polish coat of arms. It was used by the Chodkiewicz family in the times of the Polish–Lithuanian Commonwealth. A variant of the Kościesza with the Gryf coat of arms and the notable longer family line as well as much bigger family than shown here.

== Notable bearers ==
Notable bearers of this coat of arms include:

- Chodkiewicz family
- Chodko Jurewicz (c.1431–1447), founder of Chodkiewicz clan
- Ivan Chodkiewicz (?–1484), founder of the Chodkiewicz family
- Aleksander Chodkiewicz (1457–1549), voivode of the Nowogródek Voivodeship, Grand Marshal of Lithuania
- Yurii Chodkiewicz (1524–1569), voivode of the Nowogródek Voivodeship
- Hieronim Chodkiewicz (1500–1561), Grand Lithuanian Podczaszy, Elder of Samogitia, Prince of the Holy Roman Empire
- Jan Hieronimowicz Chodkiewicz (1537–1579), Livonian hetman, Grand Lithuanian Marshall, castellan of Vilnius.
- Hrehory Chodkiewicz (?–1572), Grand Lithuanian Hetman
- Jan Karol Chodkiewicz (1560–1621), Grand Hetman of Lithuania
- Krzysztof Chodkiewicz (?–1652), castellan of Vilnius, voivode of Vilnius
- Jan Kazimierz Chodkiewicz (1616–1660), castellan of Vilnius
- Anna Eufrozyna Chodkiewicz (c. 1600 – c. 1631), married Prokop Sieniawski in 1623
- Teresa Chodkiewicz (1645–1672), married Stanisław Bonifacy Krasiński about 1667
- Jan Mikołaj Chodkiewicz father of Rozalia Lubomirska 1768-1794

== Gallery ==
Coat of arms of Counts Chodkiewicz (a combination of Kościesza, Gryf, Łabędź, Pogoń Litewska and Korczak coat of arms

== See also ==
- Polish heraldry
- Heraldic family
- List of Polish nobility coats of arms

== Bibliography ==
- Herbarz polski, Tadeusz Gajl, Gdańsk 2007, ISBN 978-83-60597-10-1
