= Jan Piotr Sapieha =

Polish noble (1569–1611)

- Pan Hetman
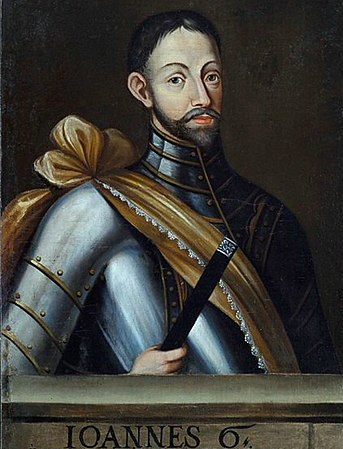
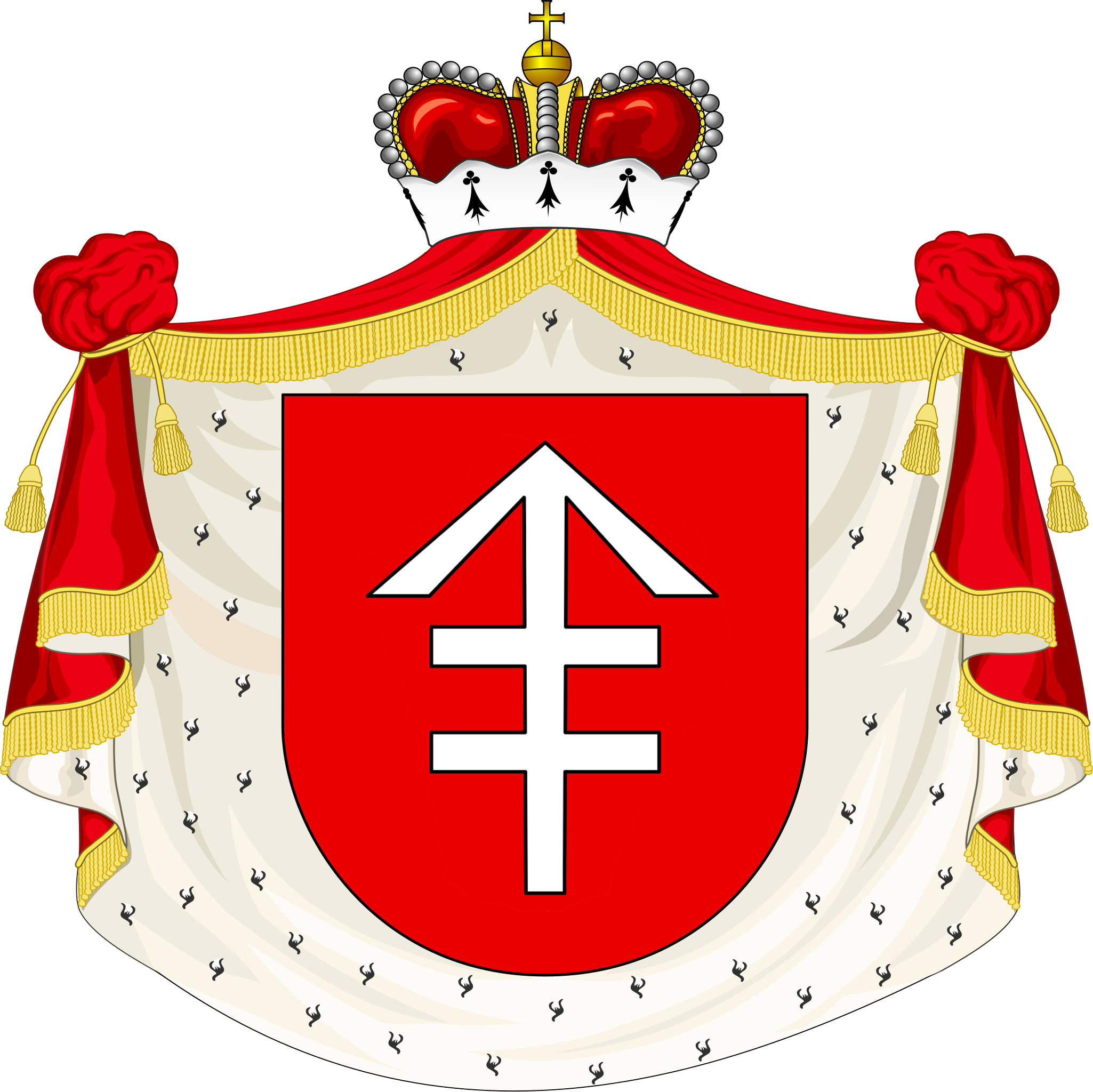
- Portrait, 1709
- Coat of arms: Lis
- Born: 1569; Bychów, Polish–Lithuanian Commonwealth
- Died: 15 October 1611; Moscow Kremlin
- Family: Sapieha
- Consort: Zofia Weiher
- Father: Paweł Sapieha
- Mother: Anna Chodkiewicz

Jan Piotr Sapieha (Belarusian: Ян Пётр Сапега; Lithuanian: Jonas Petras Sapiega; 1569–1611) was a Polish–Lithuanian nobleman (szlachcic), general, politician, diplomat, governor of Uświat county, member of the Parliament and a skilled commander of the Polish troops stationing in the Moscow Kremlin.

Sapieha was a participant in the Polish–Swedish War of 1600–1611; he brought a private regiment of 100 Cossacks and commanded the right wing of the Polish–Lithuanian army during the famous Battle of Kircholm in 1605, consisting of 400 winged hussars and 700 mounted Cossacks. He also participated in the Polish–Russian War of 1609–1618, where he commanded the failed siege of Troitse-Sergiyeva Lavra in 1608 and later fought anti-Polish Muscovite forces near Moscow, led by Prokopy Lyapunov. He died suddenly on 15 October, during the siege of the Moscow Kremlin.

Known for his ruthlessness towards the Russian peoples, he was nicknamed Pan Hetman, literally meaning Mr General.

== Biography ==
Jan Piotr was born in 1569 as the son of Anna Chodkiewicz and Paweł Sapieha. He firstly studied at the University of Vilnius (up to 1587) and then at the University of Padua. After returning from abroad he accompanied his father in an expedition against the Tartars and Vlachs. In 1600 he became a member of the parliament from the district of Grodno. Despite an initial refusal to accept the offer of Krzysztof Mikołaj "the Thunderbolt" Radziwiłł, he took part in the Livonian War (1601–1605) and on 5 March 1603, his regiments distinguished themselves in the Battle of Rakibor, under the command of Jan Karol Chodkiewicz. He also participated in the victorious Battle of Weissenstein (25 September 1604), where the Polish army besieging the city and crushed the Swedish forces. In recognition for his merits, Sapieha was given the temporary command of the Lithuanian army camp during the absence Chodkiewicz at Dorpat, and in the battle of Kircholm he commanded the whole left side of the Lithuanian army. The regiment commanded by Sapieha miraculously endured one of the main counter-attacks of the Swedish army, led personally by King Charles IX of Sweden. The participation in the Livonian campaign earned him great fame among the Polish nobility – for this, in 1606, Sapieha received a title, the county of Uświat and the parliament, in 1607, awarded him with 10 000 Polish złotys.

During the infamous and bloody Zebrzydowski Rebellion against king Sigismund III Vasa, despite the initial sympathy for the rebels, eventually Sapieha supported the side of the king and continued to favour his royal policies.

In August 1607, previously being persuaded by Lew Sapieha, he offered his services to False Dimitri. Under Dimitri he captured the city of Wiaźma and successfully crushed the Vasili IV Shuysky troops on 2 October 1608. In 1609, he commanded the unresolved battle near Kalyazin on the Volga river. After the start of king Sigismund's Moscow expedition in 1605 (known as the Dimitriads), initially Sapieha preferred to live in peace and not support the monarch at this occasion, however, under the heavy pressure of the Polish nobility and the army, he was not able to refuse and decided to aid the king in the battles on Russian territory. On 25 June 1610, the gathered troops chose Jan Piotr Sapieha as their Hetman, who would replace the previously deceased General Różyński. In July, he sent Sapieha to Moscow where, on 27 August he signed an agreement with the Boyar Duma that deposed False Dimitri and instead give the tsarist crown to Prince Władysław (future king Władysław IV).

After the death of Dmitri, in December 1610, Sapieha unsuccessfully tried to capture the village of Kaluga, however, he was more successful in capturing the town of Peremyszl later on. From January to March 1611 he led the negotiations with the boyars and hoped to either weaken the position of the king's troops favoured, supported and personally commanded by the great Hetman Stanisław Żółkiewski, or place himself on the Russian throne. On 27 March 1611 the king, worried about his "popularity" among the military commanders in the East, promised Sapieha payment and salaries in order to receive more troops. Eventually the monarch gained the trust of the Hetman. Jan Piotr joined him on 8 May, and on 18 June they arrived in Moscow; however, he was displeased and somewhat refused to fight with the enemy forces that besieged the Moscow Kremlin. Demoralized by the lack of paid salaries and of poor hygienic conditions in the camps, the Polish soldiers fell into mental apathy and immediately stopped fighting. On 15 September Sapieha became seriously ill and was transferred to the central Kremlin palace, where he died on 15 October 1611.

== Marriage and issue ==
Jan Piotr married Zofia Weiher h. Weiher and had nine children. Among others:

- Andrzej Stanisław Sapieha, castellan of Trakai and Vilnius, married Anna Heidenstein
- Paweł Jan Sapieha, Hetman, married firstly Zofia Zienowicz and secondly Barbara Kopeć
- Krystyna Sapieha, married firstly Voivode of Rawa and Łęczyca Stanisław Radziejowski h. Junosza and secondly Voivode of Inowrocław Krzysztof Gembicki h. Nałęcz

== Legacy ==
Jan Piotr Sapieha is one of the personas on the famous painting by Jan Matejko: Kazanie Skargi (The Sermon of Piotr Skarga).

Polish actor Michał Żebrowski portrayed Hetman Kybowsky (character loosely based on Jan Piotr Sapieha) in the 2007 Russian historical film 1612.

== Works ==
- Dzieje Marsa krwawego i sprawy odważne, rycerskie przez Wielmożnego Pana Jego Mości Pana Jana Piotra Sapiehę starostę uświadzkiego w monarchii moskiewskiej od roku 1608 do roku 1612 sławnie odprawowane. (diary)

== Ancestors ==
16. Semen Sopiha
8. Bohdan Sapieha (+ aft.1511)
17. Nastazja
4. Iwan Sapieha (+1546)
9. Pss Teodora Drucka Babiczówna
2. Count Paweł Sapieha
20. Pr Aleksander Sanguszkowicz
10. Pr Andrzej Sanguszko
5. Pss Hanna Sanguszkówna (+1561)
11. Bohdana Odyncewiczówna
1. Prince Jan Piotr Sapieha
24. Iwan Chodkiewicz (1420–1484)
12. Aleksander Chodkiewicz (1457–1549)
25. Pss Jawnuta Bielska
6. Hrehory Chodkiewicz (+1572)
13. Pss Wasylissa Jaroslawowiczówna
3. Anna Chodkiewicz
28. Michal Zbaraski, Pr of Vishnevtsy
14. Pr Iwan Wisniowiecki
29. Pss ? Polubinska
7. Katarzyna Wisniowiecka (+ bef.1580)
30. Semen Olizarowicz
15. Nastazja Olizarowiczowna (+ca 1536)

== Bibliography ==
- Moskwa w rękach Polaków. Pamiętniki dowódców i oficerów garnizonu w Moskwie. Marek Kubala and Tomasz Ściężor. Kraków: Platan, 2005 . ISBN 83-89711-50-8.
