= Jan Hieronimowicz Chodkiewicz =

Polish–Lithuanian noble (1537–1579)

Jonas Jeronimaitis Chodkevicius
- Governor of Livonia
- Coat of arms: Kościesza odm. Chodkiewicz
- Tenure: 1566–1578
- Born: 1537
- Died: 4 August 1579 (aged 41–42); Vilnius, Lithuania
- Buried: Vilnius Cathedral
- Family: Chodkiewicz
- Consort: Krystyna Zborowska h. Jastrzębiec
- Issue: Aleksander; Jan Karol; Hieronim; Zofia Drohostajska; Anna, Princess Joachim Korecki; Aleksandara, Princess Adam Wiśniowiecki; Elżbieta, Princess Jan Żyliński
- Father: Hieronim Chodkiewicz h. Kościesza
- Mother: Anna Szemetówna h. Łabędź

Jan Hieronimowicz Chodkiewicz (Lithuanian: Jonas Chodkevičius; Belarusian: Ян Геранімавіч Хадкевіч; c. 1537 – 4 August 1579) was a Lithuanian noble. He was Grand Stolnik of Lithuania from 1559, Elder of Samogitia (1564–1579), Governor of Livonia (1566–1578), Grand Marshal of Lithuania (1566–1579), Count of Shklow 1568, Castellan of Vilnius (1574–1579). He was the starosta of Telšiai and Plateliai from 1566, of Rumšiškės from 1568, and of Kaunas from 1569.

== Early life ==
Jan Hieronimowicz Chodkiewicz was born around 1537. He was one of the most famous Lithuanian magnates of the 16th century. He was raised a Calvinist. He studied at the Universities of Königsberg (which he entered in 1547), Leipzig (1550), and Wittenberg. He served in the court of the Holy Roman Emperor Charles V from 1552 to 1555. He returned to Lithuania in 1555.

== Military service ==
From 1559, Jan Chodkiewicz defended the Livonian Confederation with the Grand Ducal Lithuanian Army against the Muscovites during the Livonian War. He hired 1,200 cavalry at his own expense to defend Livonia. With the help of Michael Radziwiłł, Grand Chancellor of Lithuania, he succeeded in attaching Livonia to Lithuania. But this territory remained for long the main target of Russian attacks.

In 1564, he became Elder of Samogitia, in 1566 Grand Marshal of Lithuania and governor of Livonia (1566–78). As governor of Livonia, he was headquartered at Sigulda near Riga. The Lithuanian nobles obliged Chodkevičius in the Brasta sejm to implement the union between Livonia and the Grand Duchy of Lithuania, as well as to join it with Riga and Swedish-occupied Tallinn. As a result, Chodkevičius managed to reach an agreement with Livonian representatives in the sejm of Cēsis. Livonia was given his coat of arms.

During the battles with the Muscovite army in 1568, he led the Grand Ducal Lithuanian Army in the Battle of Ula. In 1578, he participated in the Livonian campaign of Stephen Báthory, the ruler of the Polish–Lithuanian Commonwealth, to retake Polotsk.

== Union of Lublin and thereafter ==
During the preparation of the documents of the Union of Lublin (1569), he persistently defended the state interests of the Grand Duchy of Lithuania and led its delegation. Just like his uncle, he was a strong opponent to the Polish–Lithuanian union at Lublin. The Lithuanian delegation to the meetings preparing the Act of Union between Poland and Lithuania was led by Jan, who insisted in a long impassioned speech on the equality and independence of the two nations. Finally "bowing to the king's power, he pointed out those parts of the Act of Union which were unacceptable to Lithuania and he stated that he yielded to the King's will only with the deepest sorrow". In practice the Union of Lublin in 1569 made sure that the Grand Duchy of Lithuania retained its own form of government and separate laws until the end of the joint state in 1795.

He supported the candidacies of the French Henri de Valois, the Russian Ivan IV the Terrible, and the Hungarian Stephen Báthory to the throne of the ruler of the Republic of the Two Nations. In 1574, he became Castellan of Vilnius. Due to health problems and military failures, he refused the position of Governor of Livonia and was dismissed in 1578. He converted to Roman Catholicism from Protestantism in 1572. He became a great benefactor to the Jesuits.

He contributed to the founding of Vilnius University and supported the chronicler Maciej Stryjkowski.

== Family ==
He married the Calvinist Krystyna Zborowska before 1559 in Kraków, daughter of Marcin Zborowski, castellan of Krakow, and Anna Konarska. She remained Calvinist despite his conversion and raised some of their daughters in that religion despite their father's will.

They had issue: Hieronim was born at Vilnius in 1559; Aleksander at Trakai in 1560; Jan Karol at Vilnius in 1560–61; Anna at Vilnius in 1562; Zofia at Vilnius in 1564, Elzbieta at Vilnius in 1568; and Aleksandra at Vilnius in 1576.

He died on 4 August 1579 and was buried in Vilnius Cathedral.

== Marriage and issue ==
Jan Hieronim married Krystyna Zborowska h. Jastrzębiec (c. 1540–1588), daughter of Marcin Zborowski h. Jastrzębiec and Anna Konarska h. Abdank, the daughter of Stanisław Konarski h. Abdank and Zofia Lanckorońska h. Zadora, in 1559, and had seven children:

- Aleksander Chodkiewicz (1560-1626), voivode of Trakai, married Eufemia Sienieńska h. Dębno, the daughter of voivode of Podole Jan Sienieński h. Dębno and Katarzyna Korniakt h. Krucyni, the daughter of Konstanty Korniakt h. Krucyni
- Jan Karol Chodkiewicz (1561-1621), voivode of Vilnius and Hetman, married Zofia Mielecka h. Gryf, the daughter of voivode of Podole and Hetman Mikołaj Mielecki h. Gryf and Princess Elżbieta Radziwiłł h. Trąby. His second wife was Princess Anna Alojza Ostrogska h. Ostrogski, the daughter of voivode of Wołyń Prince Aleksander Ostrogski h. Ostrogski and Anna Kostka h. Dąbrowa
- Hieronim Chodkiewicz (died 1576), unmarried
- Zofia Chodkiewicz (died 1576), married Grand Marshal of Lithuania Krzysztof Drohostajski h. Leliwa
- Anna Chodkiewicz (died 1626), married Prince Joachim Korecki h. Pogoń Litewska
- Aleksandara Chodkiewicz, married Prince Adam Wiśniowiecki h. Korybut
- Elżbieta Chodkiewicz, married Prince Jan Żyliński and castelan of Navahrudak Samuel Wołłowicz h. Bogorya

== Ancestry ==
Anna of Riazan	Fyodor Bielski	Chodko Jurewicz
Jarosław Hołwczyński	Jawnuta Bielska	Ivan Chodkiewicz
Elzbieta Hlebowiczówna	Melchior Szemet	Wasylissa Hołowczyńska	Aleksander Chodkiewicz
Anna Szemetówna	Hieronim Chodkiewicz
Jan Hieronimowicz Chodkiewicz

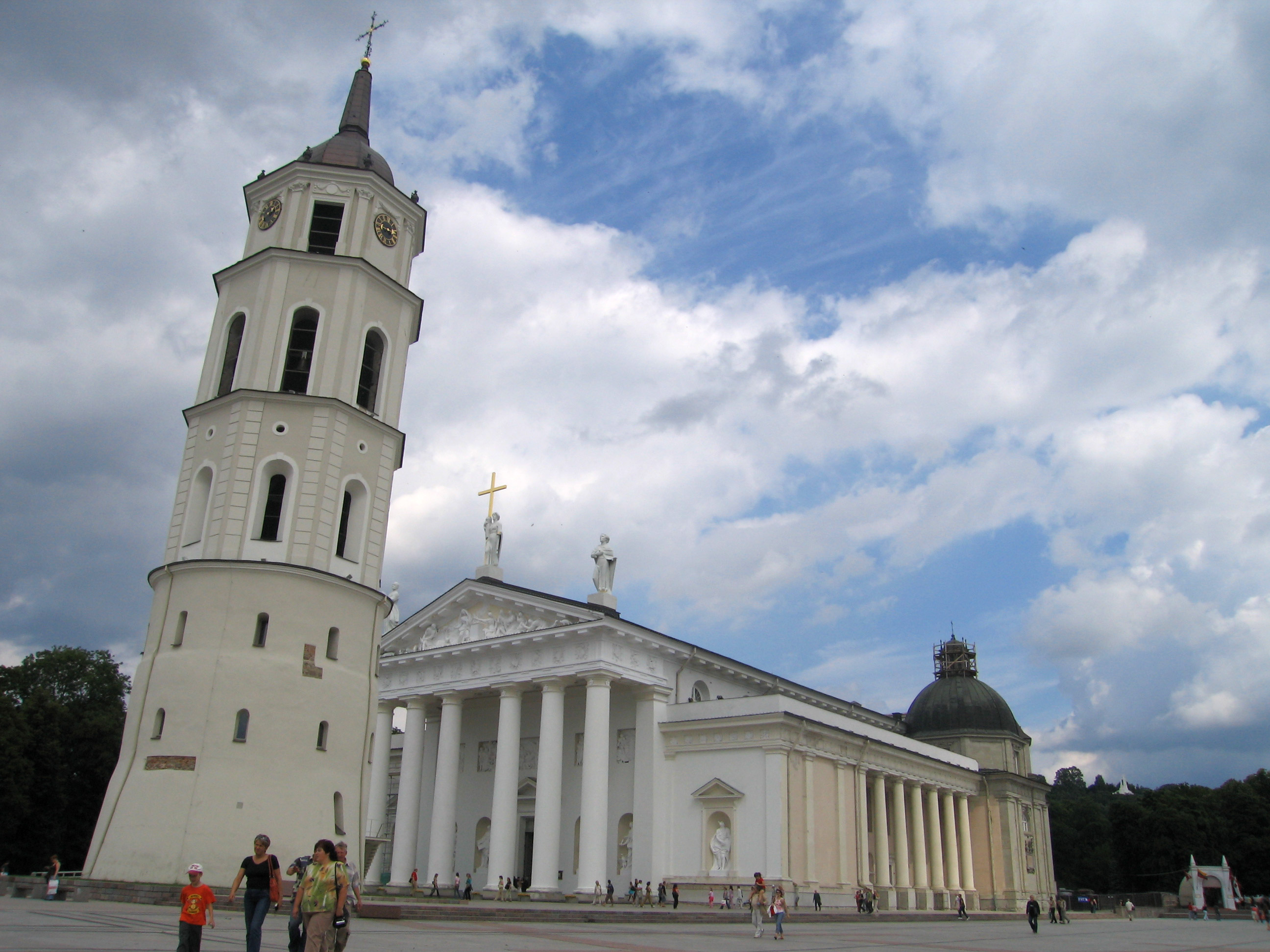
Vilnius Cathedral, place of Jan's burial

== See also ==
- House of Chodkiewicz
- Lithuanian nobility
- Ruthenian nobility
- Grand Duchy of Lithuania

== Sources ==
Danuta Bogdan, Students of the Republic at the University of Königsberg, in Królewice and Poland, Olsztyn 1993, p 82.

Leszek Kieniewicz the Senate for the Stefan Batory Foundation, Warsaw 2000, p 299.

Joseph Janowski: Jan Chodkiewicz Hieronimowicz. In: Polish Biographical Dictionary . T. 3: Brozek Jan – Chwalczewski Francis. Cracow : Polish Academy of Learning – Main Ingredients in bookstores Gebethner and Wolff, 1937, pp. 361–363. Reprint: Department of National Theatre. Ossolińskich, Kraków 1989, ISBN 8304032910.

- Tyla, Antanas (2003). "Jonas Chodkevičius". Visuotinė lietuvių enciklopedija (in Lithuanian). Vol. IV: Cha–Dir. Vilnius: Mokslo ir enciklopedijų leidybos institutas.

== Sources ==
- Hrytskyevich, Anatol (2005). "Хадкевіч". Вялікае княства Літоўскае: Энцыклапедыя — Т. 2: Кадэцкі корпус — Яцкевіч. Minsk: Беларуская Энцыклапедыя. pp. 709–711. ISBN 985-11-0378-0.
