= Krzysztof Chodkiewicz =

Polish–Lithuanian nobleman (died 1652)

- Krzysztof Chodkiewicz or
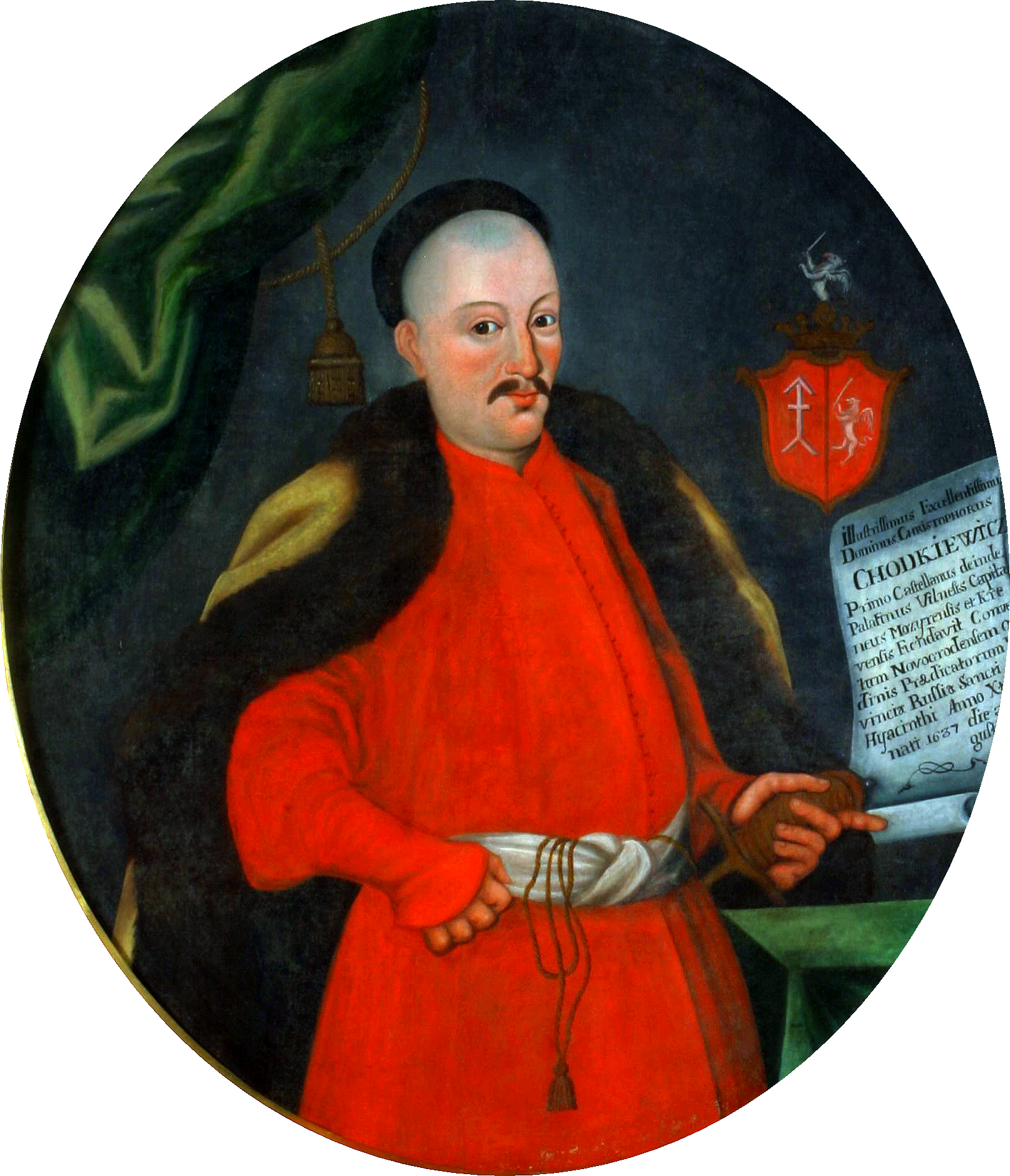

- Coat of arms: Kościesza odm.Chodkiewicz
- Born: 16th century
- Died: 1652
- Family: Chodkiewicz
- Consort: Elżbieta Kiszka; Zofia Drucka Horska
- Issue: with Elżbieta Kiszka; Aleksander Krzysztof Chodkiewicz; Jan Kazimierz Chodkiewicz; Hieronim Karol Chodkiewicz
- Father: Hieronim Chodkiewicz
- Mother: Anna Tarło

Krzysztof Chodkiewicz or Kristupas Chodkevičius (Katkevičius; died 3 October 1652) was a Polish–Lithuanian nobleman (szlachcic).

== History ==
Chodkiewicz held the title of Great Standard Bearer of Lithuania (Lithuanian: Vėliavininkas). In 1610, he was named Master of the Horse of Lithuania. In 1623, Castellan of Trakai, and in 1633, Castellan of Vilnius, in 1636, Voivode of Vilnius. Finally in 1642, he became Starost (Grodzki) of Babruysk, Kreva and held the deeds to Biała and Vishnyeva.

During the Polish–Swedish War, he participated in the siege of Pärnu, which started on February 28, 1601, under the command of his cousin, Jan Karol Chodkiewicz.

He also took part in the Polish–Muscovite War, as a pułkownik (colonel) of the Lisowczyk regiment until March 28, 1617. In 1616, a regiment under his command captured and burned Kursk and several smaller cities. He was also a participant in the Battle of Bołchow.

He died on 3 October 1652.

== See also ==
- Chodkiewicz family
- Lithuanian nobility

== Sources ==
- Hrytskyevich, Anatol (2005). "Хадкевіч". Вялікае княства Літоўскае: Энцыклапедыя — Т. 2: Кадэцкі корпус — Яцкевіч. Minsk: Беларуская Энцыклапедыя. pp. 709–711. ISBN 985-11-0378-0.
