= Chodkiewicz =

Polish noble family

- Chodkiewicz
- Current region: Poland, Belarus and Lithuania
- Origin: Grand Duchy of Lithuania
- Members: Aleksander Chodkiewicz; Grzegorz Chodkiewicz; Jan Karol Chodkiewicz; Krzysztof Chodkiewicz

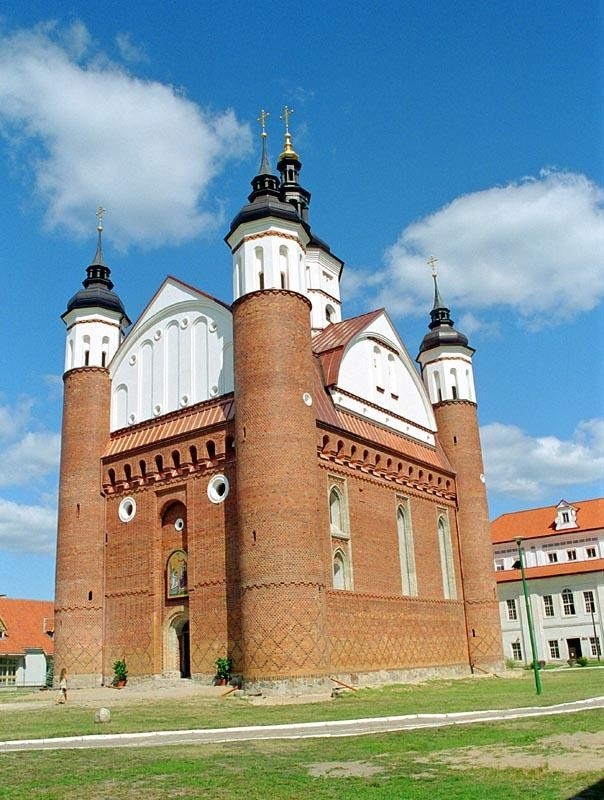
Supraśl Monastery founded by Aleksander Chodkiewicz

The House of Chodkiewicz (Belarusian: Хадкевіч; Lithuanian: Chodkevičius) was one of the most influential noble families of Lithuanian-Ruthenian descent within the Polish–Lithuanian Commonwealth in the 16th and 17th century.

== History ==
Chodko Jurewicz, chamberlain to Grand Duke Vytenis, was probably the ancestor of the whole clan and gave it the name Chodkiewicz, meaning "son of Chodzko". Surnames were not used in that time, but apparently later in history, the name Chodzko became a surname after Christianization of Chodzko Juriewicz, father of Iwan (later Jan) Chodkiewicz. They bore the Chodkiewicz coat of arms. In 1572, Jan Hieronimowicz Chodkiewicz converted from Calvinism to Roman Catholicism with his two sons, which made them the first Polonized generation of the once Lithuanian-Ruthenian family. Emperor Charles V granted them the title of Imperial Count.

== Notable family members ==
- Chodko Jurewicz (c.1431–1447), founder of Chodkiewicz clan
- Ivan Chodkiewicz (?–1484), founder of the Chodkiewicz family
- Aleksander Chodkiewicz (1475–1549), voivode of Navahrudak, Grand Marshal of Lithuania
- Yurii Chodkiewicz (1524–1569), voivode of the Nowogródek Voivodeship
- Hieronim Chodkiewicz (1500–1561), Grand Lithuanian Deputy cup-bearer, Elder of Samogitia, Count of the Roman Empire
- Jan Hieronimowicz Chodkiewicz (1537–1579), Livonian hetman, Grand Lithuanian Marshal, castellan of Vilnius.
- Grzegorz Chodkiewicz (?–1572), Grand Lithuanian Hetman
- Jan Karol Chodkiewicz (1560–1621), Grand Lithuanian Hetman
- Krzysztof Chodkiewicz (?–1652), castellan of Vilnius, voivode of Vilnius
- Jan Kazimierz Chodkiewicz (1616–1660), castellan of Vilnius
- Anna Eufrozyna Chodkiewicz (c. 1600 – c. 1631), married Prokop Sieniawski in 1623
- Teresa Chodkiewicz (1645–1672), married Stanisław Bonifacy Krasiński about 1667
- Jan Mikołaj Chodkiewicz (1738–1781), father of Rozalia Lubomirska
- Aleksander Chodkiewicz (1776-1838), Polish–Lithuanian patriot and polymath

== See also ==
- Lithuanian nobility
- List of szlachta

== Sources ==
- Hrytskyevich, Anatol (2005). "Хадкевіч". Вялікае княства Літоўскае: Энцыклапедыя — Т. 2: Кадэцкі корпус — Яцкевіч. Minsk: Беларуская Энцыклапедыя. pp. 709–711. ISBN 985-11-0378-0.
- Niesiecki, Kasper. Herbarz polski Kaspra Niesieckiego. Published by Waif, 1839, Google Print, p.48 (public domain)
