= Hungarian Company of the Lithuanian Grand Marshal =

- Active: 1717–1794
- Country: Grand Duchy of Lithuania
- Type: Infantry

The Hungarian Company of the Lithuanian Grand Marshal (Polish: Chorągiew Węgierska Laski W. Ks. Lit.) was a military unit of the Grand Duchy of Lithuania.

== History ==
The company was formed in 1717. The Lithuanian Maršalka was the chef of the infantry company, which was always present wherever he was. It was disbanded in 1794.

== Commanders ==
No.	Portrait	Commander	Took office	Left office	Time in office
1	Onufry Zawadzki	Rotmistrz; Onufry Zawadzki	1787	1793	2 years, 0 days
2	Józef Lubański Grzymała	Rotmistrz; Józef Lubański Grzymała	1793	1794	1 year, 0 days

== Bibliography ==
=== References ===
- Gembarzewski, Bronisław (1925), Rodowody pułków polskich i oddziałów równorzędnych od r. 1717 do r. 1831 (in Polish), Warszawa: Towarzystwo Wiedzy Wojskowej
- Rospond, Vincent W. (2013). Commonwealth Armies of the Partitions 1770–1794. Great Britain: Osprey Publishing. ISBN 978-1-84908855-8.
