= Shchytkavichy rural council =

Shchytkavistki rural council (Belarusian: Шчыткавіцкі сельсавет, Russian: Щитковичский сельсовет) is a lower-level subdivision (selsoviet) of Staryya Darohi district, Minsk region, Belarus. Its center is the agrotown of Shchytkavichy.

The population from the 2009 Belarusian census and 2019 Belarusian census were 1,565 and 1,224 respectively.
