= Novadarozhski rural council =

Novadarozhski rural council is a lower-level subdivision (selsoviet) of Staryya Darohi district, Minsk region, Belarus.
