= Hrehory Chodkiewicz =

Lithuanian military officer

- Grand Hetman of Lithuania
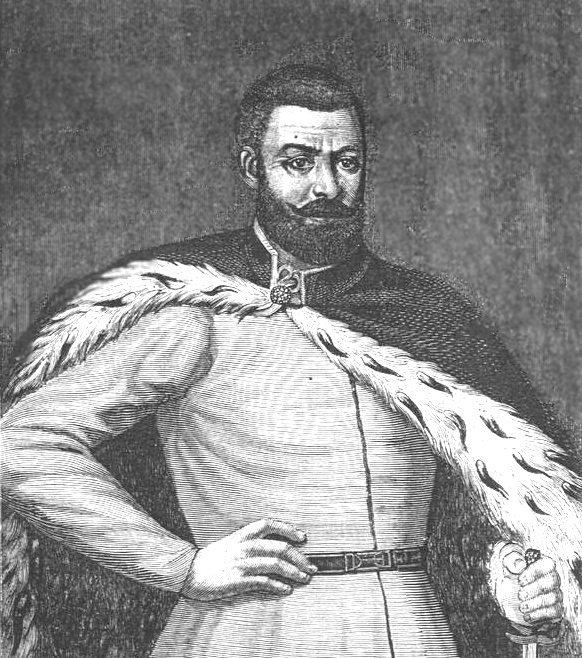
- Coat of arms: Kościesza (Chodkiewicz)
- Born: c. 1514
- Died: 12 November 1572 or 19 November 1573
- Noble family: Chodkiewicz
- Spouse: Katarzyna Wisniowiecka
- Issue: Anna; Aleksandra; Andrzej; Aleksander; Zofia
- Father: Aleksander Chodkiewicz
- Mother: Wasylissa Jaroslawowiczówna Hołowczyńska

Hrehory Chodkiewicz (Lithuanian: Grigalius Chodkevičius, Ukrainian: Григорій Олександрович Ходкевич, romanized: Hryhorii Oleksandrovych Khodkevych; c. 1514 – 12 November 1572 or 19 November 1573) was a Ruthenian noble and military officer of the Grand Duchy of Lithuania. He was a son of Aleksander, brother of Hieronim and Yurii, and uncle of Jan Hieronimowicz Chodkiewicz. He commanded the Grand Ducal Lithuanian Army during the latter part of the Livonian War after he had become the Grand Hetman of Lithuania in 1566.

== Early life and career ==
Hrehory Chodkiewicz was the son of Aleksander Chodkiewicz. He was long held to have been born around 1505. However, Lithuania historian Genutė Kirkienė noted that in such a case Chodkiewicz began his political career in his mid-forties, when most nobles started in late twenties or early thirties. Kirkienė suggested that his father's marriage and birth of children should be moved from 1500s to mid-1510s. As a young boy Chodkiewicz was sent to the court of Albert, Duke of Prussia. He returned in 1532 with personal recommendation letters from Albert to King Sigismund I the Old, Prince Sigismund II Augustus and Queen Bona Sforza. The relationship and correspondence with Albert continued for decades; Chodkiewicz sent both of his sons to be educated at Albert's court.

He received his first position at the court in October 1544 when incoming Grand Duke Sigismund Augustus made a series of new appointments and elevated Chodkiewicz to court chamberlain (podkomorzy). Soon, however, the Chodkiewicz family fell from royal grace when they opposed the marriage between Sigismund Augustus and Barbara Radziwiłł. It seems that Hrehory Chodkiewicz remained close with Sigismund Augustus and often accompanied the Grand Duke to hunting. After his father's death in 1549, he inherited Supraśl and surrounding territories, including Zabłudów and Choroszcz. Chodkiewicz family slowly regained royal favor after Barbara's death in 1551 and when other Radziwiłłs opposed the proposed Union of Lublin in 1562.

== Military achievements ==
As voivode of Kiev, Chodkiewicz defended the region from Tatar invasion. In 1558, he achieved a victory in Podolia against the Crimean Khanate. This victory raised prestige of Chodkiewicz as a military commander. On the onset of the Livonian War, he was promoted to castellan of Trakai with intention to use his skill in the war. In 1561, Grand Hetman Mikołaj Radziwiłł the Black, Chodkiewicz, and his brother Hieronim led the Grand Ducal Lithuanian Army into Livonia where they achieved victory against the Tsardom of Russia. After this campaign, Chodkiewicz was promoted to Field Lithuanian Hetman. On 20 January 1564 the Lithuanians under his command killed Russian commander Shuisky and defeated the Russian army in the Battle of Ula, which significantly improved Lithuania's standing in the war. He was hailed as war hero and promoted to castellan of Vilnius. Royal favor continued: Hrehory's nephew Jan Hieronimowicz received his late father's position as Elder of Samogitia in 1564, brother Yurii, who traveled to Moscow for diplomatic negotiations, became castellan of Trakai and Hrehory was appointed Grand Hetman of Lithuania in 1566. Thus, Hrehory Chodkiewicz became the second man after Mikołaj Radziwiłł the Red and the Chodkiewiczs controlled three out of five top seats in the Lithuanian Council of Lords. In 1567, Chodkiewicz achieved another victory in Livonia, this time against the Kingdom of Sweden.

== Cultural activities ==
Chodkiewicz devoted much attention to military matters. In 1562 and 1566, he wrote military regulations, which dealt with defense of fortresses and other matters. He also built and strengthened a number of border posts and conducted the military census of 1568 to determine how many troops each noble had to provide for the army. In 1563 Chodkiewicz founded an Eastern Orthodox church and a hospital for the poor in Zabłudów. Kirkienė found hints that Chodkiewicz was not strictly Orthodox and supported church union—eastern liturgy under the Pope in Rome; Barbara Radziwiłł even considered him as Ruthenian baptized into Catholicism. In 1566, Chodkiewicz sponsored Pyotr Mstislavets and Ivan Fyodorov, book printers who defected from Russia, and opened a printing press in Zabłudów. They published religious texts until Chodkiewicz's death. He died on 12 November 1572 or 19 November 1573.

== Titles and positions ==
Chodkiewicz held the following positions:

- Court chamberlain (podkomorzy, 1544–1559)
- Starost of Kaunas (1546–1551), Rumšiškės (1551–1555), Karmėlava (1551–1563), Hrodna (1563–1569), Mogilev (1564–1569)
- Voivode of Vitebsk (1554) and Kiev (1555–1558)
- Castellan of Trakai (1559–1564) and Vilnius (1564–1572)
- Elder of Samogitia (1562–1563)
- Field Lithuanian Hetman (1561–1566) and Grand Lithuanian Hetman (1566–1572)

== Family ==
Around 1537, Chodkiewicz married Katarzyna from the Wiśniowiecki family who brought many new lands into the Chodkiewicz family. Chodkiewicz sued Konstanty Ostrogski and his son Ilia for various territories belonging to his wife. They had two sons and three daughters. The sons had no heirs and the Supraśl line of the family became extinct. The possessions passed to Yurii Chodkiewicz, brother of Hrehory. All daughters married members of the Lithuanian Council of Lords. The children were:

- Andrzej (born 1549) was starost of Mogilev (1574–1575). His father wanted him to marry a daughter of Mikołaj Radziwiłł the Red, but he died in 1575.
- Aleksander (born 1550) married Aleksandra, daughter of Wasyl Tyszkiewicz. Died in 1578 with no heirs.
- Anna married Pawel Sapieha, castellan of Kiev, and Pawel Pac, castellan of Vilnius
- Zofia married Duke Janusz Zasławski (died 1562) and Filon Kmita Czornobylski, voivode of Smolensk
- Aleksandra married famous military leader Roman Sanguszko, voivode of Bratslav and Lithuanian Field Hetman, in 1559

Hrehory Chodkiewicz Chodkiewicz Born: c. 1514 Died: November 9 1572
| Preceded by Frederyk Pronski | Voivode of Kiev; 1555–1558 | Succeeded by Konstanty Wasyl Ostrogski |
| Preceded by Andrzej Niemirowicz | Field Hetman of the Grand Duchy of Lithuania; 1561–1566 | Succeeded by Roman Sanguszko |
| Preceded by Mikołaj "the Red" Radziwiłł | Grand Hetman of the Grand Duchy of Lithuania; 1566–1572 | Succeeded by Mikołaj "the Red" Radziwiłł |
