= Yurii Chodkiewicz =

Ruthenian noble (died 1569)

- Coat of arms: Kościesza odm.Chodkiewicz
- Born: c. 1515; Trakai
- Died: 6 June 1569 (aged 53–54)
- Noble family: Chodkiewicz
- Consorts: Eugenia Hornostajówna; Sophia Olelkovich-Slutska
- Father: Aleksander Chodkiewicz
- Mother: Wasylissa Jaroslawowiczówna Hołowczyńska

Knyaz Yurii Chodkiewicz (Lithuanian: Jurgis Chodkevičius; c. 1515 – 6 June 1569) was a Lithuanian-Ruthenian noble who served as Bielsk starost in 1556, Puńsk starost in 1568, Great Master of the Pantry of Lithuania in 1554, Grand Krajczy of Lithuania in 1555, and Trakai castellan in 1566.

== Family ==
Yurii was the son of Aleksander Chodkiewicz. He married Eugenia Hornostajowna before 1555 in Trakai. They had two children, Konstanty, born in Trakai in 1553, and Zofia, born in Zhytomir the following year. Eugenia died in 1557.

In 1558, he married Princess Sophia Olelkovich-Slutska. She gave birth to Hieronim in 1560 in Vilnius, Halszka 1564 in Trakai, and Jerzy in 1570 in Žemaitkiemis.

Yurii died on 6 June 1569.

== Ancestry ==
Anna of Riazan	Fyodor Bielski	Chodko Jurewicz
Jaroslav Hołwczyński	Jawnuta Bielska	Ivan Chodkiewicz
Wasylissa Hołowczyńska	Aleksander Chodkiewicz
Yurii Chodkiewicz

== See also ==
- House of Chodkiewicz
- Lithuanian nobility
- Grand Duchy of Lithuania

== Sources ==
- Hrytskyevich, Anatol (2005). "Хадкевіч". Вялікае княства Літоўскае: Энцыклапедыя — Т. 2: Кадэцкі корпус — Яцкевіч. Minsk: Беларуская Энцыклапедыя. pp. 709–711. ISBN 985-11-0378-0.
