= Aleksander Chodkiewicz =

Ruthenian noble (c. 1475 – 1549)

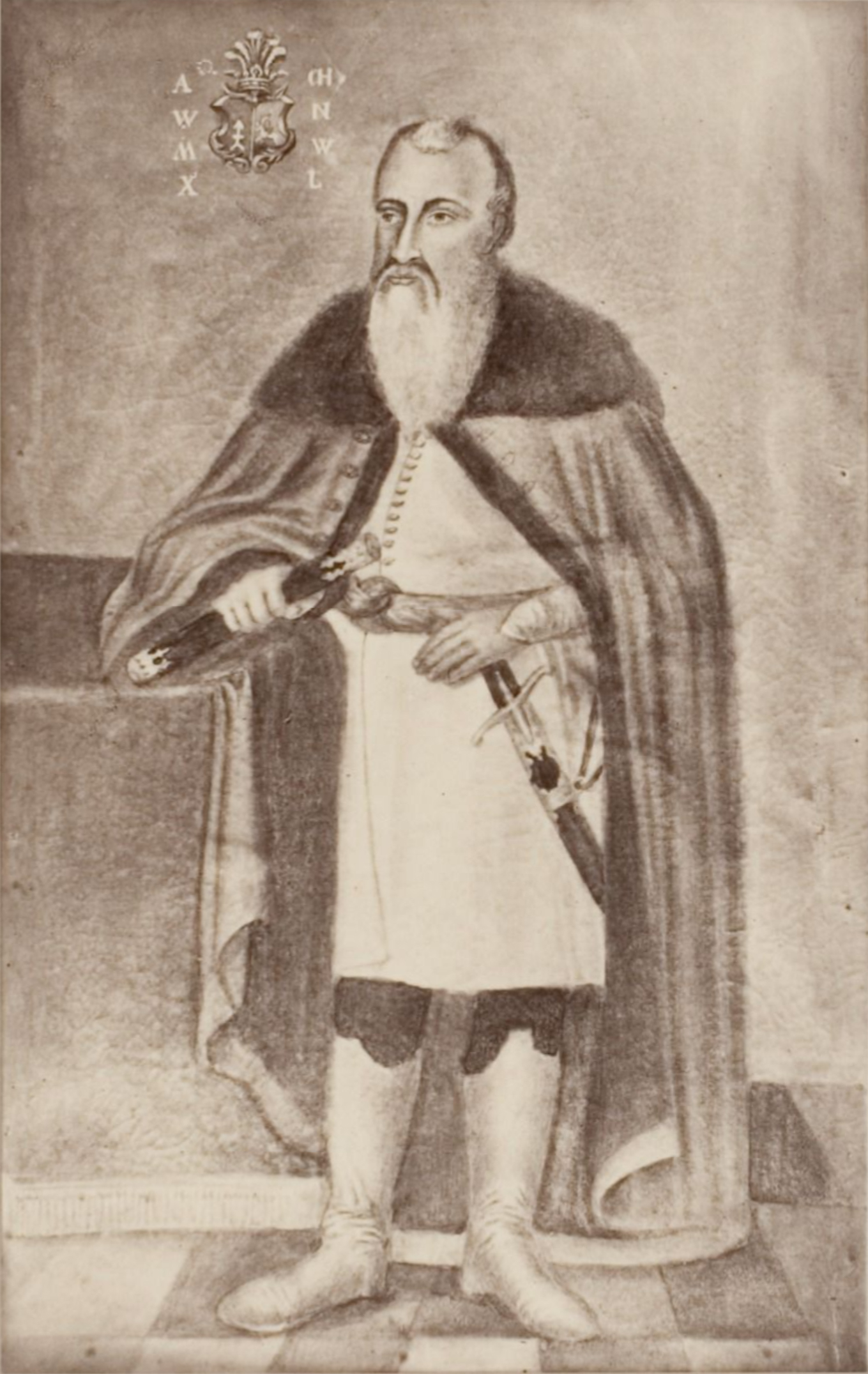
- Fresco inside the Supraśl Orthodox Monastery
- Coat of arms: Chodkiewicz (Kościesza)
- Born: c. 1475
- Died: 28 May 1549 (aged 73–74)
- Noble family: Chodkiewicz
- Spouse: Wasylisa Jaroslawiczowna Hołowczyńska
- Issue: Hieronim Chodkiewicz; Grzegorz (Hrehory) Chodkiewicz; Jerzy (Jurii) Chodkiewicz; Alexandra; Zofia
- Father: Ivan Chodkiewicz
- Mother: Jawnuta (Agnieszka) Bielska

Aleksander Chodkiewicz (Ukrainian: Олександр Ходкевич; Belarusian: Аляксандар Хадкевіч; Lithuanian: Aleksandras Chodkevičius; c. 1475 – 28 May 1549) was a Ruthenian noble from the Grand Duchy of Lithuania, founder of the Supraśl Orthodox Monastery. He inherited vast possessions from his father Ivan Chodkiewicz, which made him 11th wealthiest person in the Grand Duchy according to the military census of 1528. Via his mother Jawnuta (Agnieszka) of the Belsky family, he was second cousin to Kings of Poland and Grand Dukes of Lithuania John I Albert, Alexander Jagiellon, and Sigismund I the Old. Chodkiewicz quickly gained influence under Alexander Jagiellon, becoming royal marshal. However, after Alexander's's death in 1506 his career stagnated. He supported Queen Bona Sforza, gaining her favor and becoming starost of Brest in 1528. The peak of his career came in 1544 when young Sigismund II Augustus, still influenced by his mother, appointed Chodkiewicz as voivode of Nowogródek and his son Hieronim as Castellan of Trakai.

== Early life and political career ==
He was born around 1457. As a young boy, Chodkiewicz was taken hostage with his family by the Tatars of the Crimean Khanate in October 1482. His father and sister died in captivity, while he, his mother and sister Agrafena were ransomed in 1484 and returned to Lithuania. Chodkiewicz appeared in the political arena in 1495 when he won a court case against the caretakers of a royal estate. At the time he already was a member of the Royal court. Chodkiewicz was a favorite of Grand Duke Alexander Jagiellon, who granted him his first public position as governor of Punia in 1501. On October 30, 1501, Chodkiewicz was among 27 nobles agreeing to abide by the Union of Mielnik. The next year he was appointed as royal Master of the Horse (koniuszy). It was an honorary title, but signified royal favor. In 1506, Chodkiewicz became royal marshal (marszałek hospodarski), a position which guaranteed close contacts with the King and granted a seat in the Lithuanian Council of Lords. However, after the death of Alexander Jagiellon, Chodkiewicz's career stagnated.

Chodkiewicz was accused of participating in the 1508 uprising organized by Michael Glinski. However, there was not enough proof and he was released from prison in 1511. He returned to the previous position of court marshal and was sent on several diplomatic missions to Poland. Due to the Muscovite–Lithuanian Wars the state budget was emptied and the Grand Duke mortgaged his properties to raise funds. This way Chodkiewicz acquired Ostrovo west of Lida (1520) and Vilkija (1522). In 1525 he obtained a privilege to establish Zabłudów. Around the same time he began consolidating his holdings near Choroszcz—the resulting complex was ranked 3rd in size after the holdings of the Radziwiłł and Goštautai families.

Chodkiewicz supported Queen Bona Sforza in her efforts to consolidated royal estates. Perhaps due to her favor in 1528 Chodkiewicz became starost of Brest, a position that was similar to voivodes (Brest Litovsk Voivodeship was established in 1566). In 1530, Chodkiewicz became governor of Knyszyn, favorite hunting location of Grand Duke Sigismund. For unknown reasons, perhaps due to poor health, he was skipped for several promotions to voivode. In 1530s he was tasked with delineating the border between the Grand Duchy of Lithuania and the Kingdom of Poland.

In 1544, Sigismund I the Old transferred much of his political power within the Grand Duchy of Lithuania to his son Sigismund II Augustus, who was significantly influenced by his mother Queen Sforca. Sigismund Augustus almost immediately made new appointments: Chodkiewicz became voivode of Nowogródek while his son Hieronim became castellan of Trakai. Both of these positions are entitled to a seat in the Council of Lords. The following year Hieronim was further promoted to Elder of Samogitia; thus Hieronim politically surpassed his father. These appointments marked a considerable social jump for the Chodkiewicz family. The Chodkiewiczs sided with Queen Sforza against their political rival Barbara Radziwiłł, involved in a love affair with Sigismund Augustus. By the time Aleksander Chodkiewicz died on 28 May 1549, his sons, especially Hieronim, were well-established in politics and the family was second in power after the Radziwiłłs.

== Supraśl Monastery ==
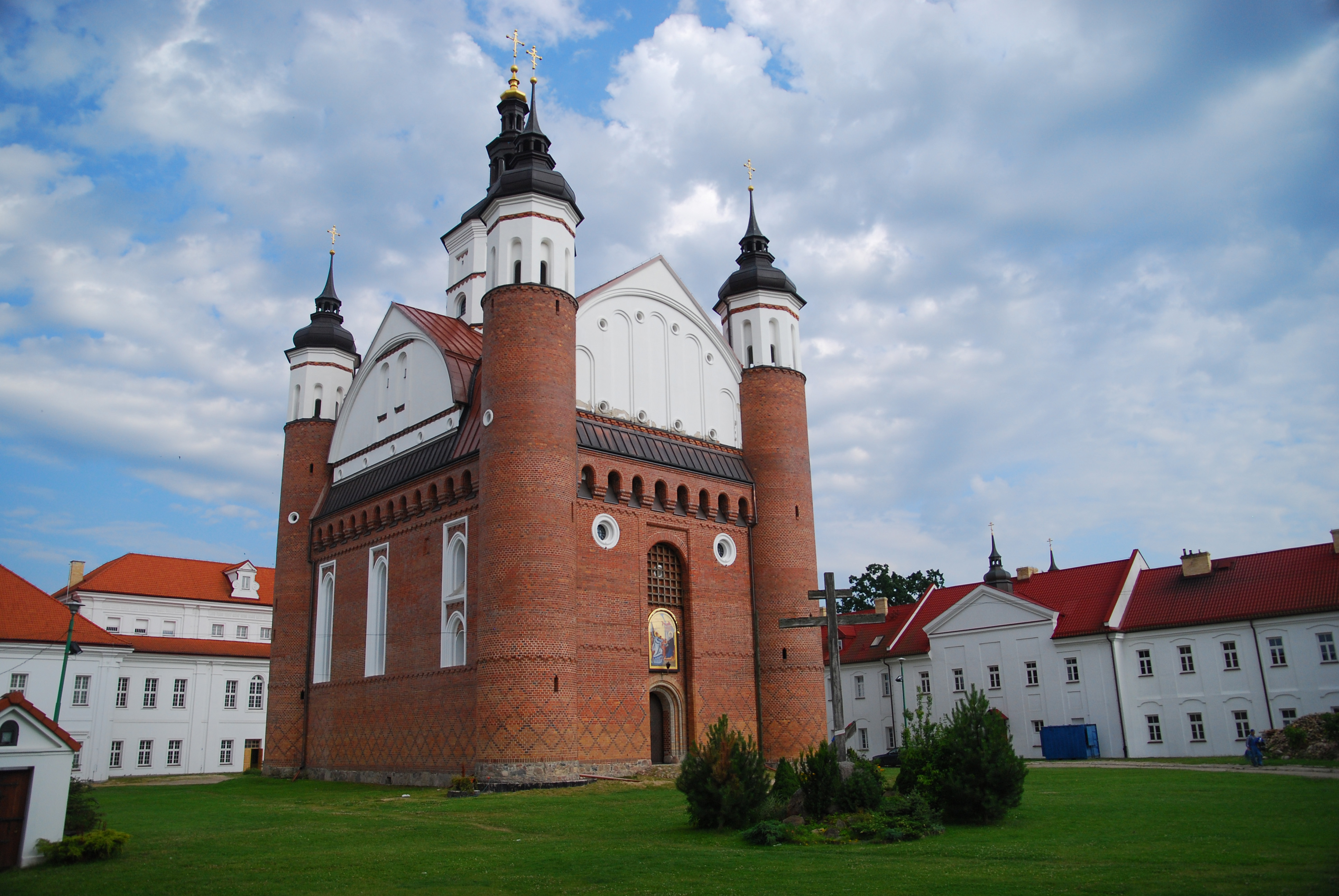
Church of the Annunciation in Supraśl

Already in 1498, Chodkiewicz founded what became the Supraśl Orthodox Monastery in lands inherited from his father. The monastery combines features of fortified churches, Western Gothic and Eastern Byzantine architectures. Polish historian Józef Maroszek argued that this unique blend of the early 16th century was related to attempts to establish a church union between Roman Catholicism and Eastern Orthodoxy. Lithuanian historian Genutė Kirkienė further claimed that Chodkiewicz was a follower of Joseph Bolgarynovich, Metropolitan of Kiev in 1498–1501, who supported the church union as agreed in the Council of Florence—Orthodox would retain their rites and churches, but would be subordinates of the Pope in Rome. After Bolgarynovich's death the union was abandoned at the metropolitan level, but Kirkienė found hints that Supraśl continued the idea locally. The monastery soon was granted the status of lavra—it became an autonomous body with great rights reserved for its founder (ktetor) and various restrictions placed on the Metropolitan.

The Supraśl Monastery became a cultural and spiritual center as well as a mausoleum of the Chodkiewicz family. Alexander's mother was the first person buried in its catacombs; he is buried there as well.

== Titles and positions ==
Aleksander Chodkiewicz had the following titles and positions:

- Governor of Punia (1501–1511)
- Royal marshal (1506–1549)
- Starost of Ostrovo (1520–1547), Vilkija (1522–1549), Brest (1528–1547), Knyszyn (1530–1547)
- Voivode of Nowogródek (1544–1547)

== Family ==
In 1513, Chodkiewicz married Princess Wasylisa Jarosławiczówna Hołowczyńska. They had three male descendants, who started three branches of the Chodkewicz clan. The children spend time at the court of Albert, Duke of Prussia and were exposed to Protestantism. His son Hieronim converted to Lutheranism while daughter Zofia married a Lutheran. Chodkiewicz had five children:

- Hieronim Chodkiewicz (ca. 1515–1561) founder of the Shklow (or Bykhaw) line
- Hrehory Chodkiewicz (ca. 1517–1572) founder of the Supraśl line
- Yurii Chodkiewicz (after 1520–1569) founder of the Vyalikaya Byerastavitsa line
- Alexandra, married Grigory Burnevski
- Zofia, married Stanislovas Mikolaitis Kęsgaila
