= Palazhevitski rural council =

Subdivision of Minsk region, Belarus

Coordinates: 52°55′55″N 28°25′52″E

Palazhevitski rural council is a lower-level subdivision (selsoviet) of Staryya Darohi district, Minsk region, Belarus. Its administrative center is agrotown Palazhevichy.

As of the 2009 Belarusian census, the population of the Palazhevitski rural council was 1,402. The population dropped to 1,218 by the time of the 2019 Belarusian census.
