= Hieronim Chodkiewicz =

Ruthenian noble (c. 1515 – 1561)

- Coat of arms: Chodkiewicz (Kościesza)
- Born: c. 1515
- Died: 1561
- Noble family: Chodkiewicz
- Spouse: Anna Szemetówna
- Issue: Jan Hieronimowicz, Krystyna, Halszka, Anna, Zofia, Barbara, Konstancja
- Father: Aleksander Chodkiewicz
- Mother: Wasylissa Jaroslawowiczówna Hołowczyńska

Hieronim Chodkiewicz (Lithuanian: Jeronimas Chodkevičius; c. 1515 – 1561) was a nobleman from the Grand Duchy of Lithuania, who was Elder of Samogitia from 1545 until his death. He was son of Aleksander and brother of Hrehory and Yurii Chodkiewiczs. Due to the political success of Chodkiewicz and his brothers, the Chodkiewicz family became the second wealthiest family in the Grand Duchy after the Radziwiłłs according to a military census of 1567, a significant increase from the 1528 census when their father Alexander was 11th on the list. Chodkiewicz distanced himself from his Eastern Orthodox roots—he possibly converted to Catholicism around 1530 and to Lutheranism around 1550.

== Religion ==
Traditional historiography usually states that Chodkiewicz was born around 1500. However, Lithuanian historian Genutė Kirkienė has noted that in such a case Chodkiewicz would have begun his political career in his mid-forties, when most nobles started in late twenties or early thirties. Kirkienė suggested that his father's marriage and birth of children should be moved from the 1500s to mid-1510s. Kirkienė also argued that Hieronim was born as Ivan and raised as Eastern Orthodox—he converted to Catholicism and was baptized Hieronim (after St. Jerome) around 1530. That would explain his later marriage to a Catholic and appointment to positions in Vilnius and Trakai generally reserved for Catholics. Chodkiewicz corresponded with known Protestant activist Albert, Duke of Prussia since the mid-1530s and send his son Jan Hieronimowicz to be educated there. He was also a sponsor of theologian Friedrich Staphylus, who visited him in Lithuania in spring 1549. The historiography usually provides 1553 as the year when Chodkiewicz fully converted to Lutheranism.

== Political career ==
The political rise of Chodkiewicz was related to the transfer of power from Grand Duke Sigismund I the Old to his son Sigismund II Augustus. In 1542, Sigismund the Old made a series of appointments to various political posts and Chodkiewicz became Royal Deputy Cup-bearer of Lithuania. In 1544, Sigismund Augustus was entrusted to rule the Grand Duchy and almost immediately made new appointments. Chodkiewicz became castellan of Trakai while his father was promoted to voivode of Nowogródek. Both of these positions guaranteed seats in the Lithuanian Council of Lords. Just a year later, in 1545, Hieronim Chodkiewicz was further promoted to Elder of Samogitia thus politically surpassing his father. The appointment to Samogitia most likely was due to his marriage to a Samogitian noblewoman. Chodkiewicz and his son held the position until 1579, replacing Kęsgailos as the most influential Samogitian family and acquiring many properties in Samogitia, including Kretinga, Skuodas, Lyduvėnai. Šaukėnai, obtained as his wife's dowry, became the primary residence of the Chodkiewicz family in Samogitia.

Chodkiewicz supported Queen Bona Sforza when she vehemently opposed the marriage of Barbara Radziwiłł and Sigismund Augustus. That brought Chodkiewicz into disfavor of Sigismund and further rivalry with the Radziwiłłs, who swept all the top posts and almost became de facto rulers in Lithuania. In 1555, King Sigismund II Augustus sent him on a diplomatic mission to Pope Paul IV and Holy Roman Emperor Charles V. The latter granted him and his family the honorary title of Graf. Further career of Chodkiewicz was related to the Livonian War. In 1559, Hieronim Chodkiewicz was promoted to castellan of Vilnius and his brother Hrehory, noted for loyal military service, became castellan of Trakai. In 1560, Hieronim commanded the Lithuanian armies in Livonia, defeating the Muscovites at Cēsis (Wenden). He died in 1561, and his death was a blow to the family as it lost influential seats in the Council of Lords. Partially thanks to the successful military campaigns of Hrehory, the Chodkiewiczs restored their influence within three years.

== Titles and positions ==
Chodkiewicz held the following titles and positions:

- Starost of Vilkija (1536 or 1550–1561), Ashmyany (1538–1541), Radun (1542–1545), Plateliai and Telšiai (1546–1554), Shkloŭ (1550–1554)
- Royal Cup-bearer (1542–1544)
- Castellan of Trakai (1544–1549) and Vilnius (1559–1561)
- Elder of Samogitia (1545–1561)
- Graf of Bykhaw, Shkloŭ and Mysz (1555–1561)

== Family ==
Sometime between 1536 and 1545, Chodkiewicz married widow Anna Szemetówna (Lithuanian: Ona Šemetaitė), daughter of Jan Szemet (Lithuanian: Jonas Šemeta). He had one son, Ivan Hieronimovich, born in about 1537, who became Elder of Samogitia and Grand Marshal of Lithuania. Chodkiewicz had seven daughters. Five of them were married to members of the Lithuanian Council of Lords:

- Zofia married Mikołaj Aleksandrowicz Czartoryski, voivode of Volhynia
- Barbara married Mikołaj Kiszka, Voivode of Podlaskie, in 1563
- Krystyna married Stanisław Pac, voivode of Vitebsk, in 1564
- Halszka married Szczęsny Hołowczyński, castellan of Minsk
- Konstancja married Pawel Wołłowicz, castellan of Navahradak
- Anna married Jan Leśniewski, deputy cup-bearer and royal secretary
- Daughter, name unknown, married Mikołaj Wolski
