= Jurgaitis =

- Lithuanian surname
- m.: Jurgaitis
- f.: (unmarried): Jurgaitytė
- f.: (married): Jurgaitienė

Jurgaitis is a Lithuanian family name. Notable people with the surname include:

- Chodka Jurgaitis (1400-1447), Lithuanian name of Chodko Jurewicz, Ruthenian noble from the Grand Duchy of Lithuania
- Eglė Jurgaitytė (born 1998), Lithuanian singer and radio presenter
