= Chodko Jurewicz =

Ruthenian noble (fl. c. 1400–1447)

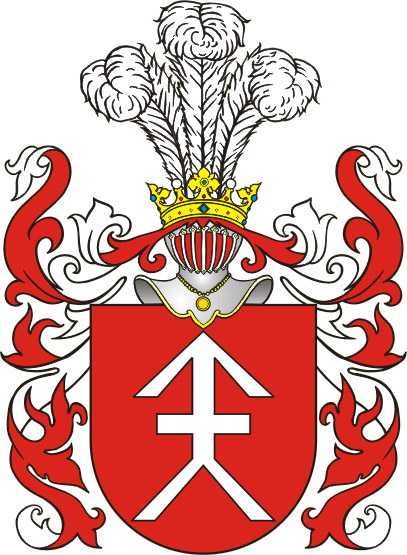
Kościesza coat of arms was used by Chodko since 1431. It is unclear how he obtained the Polish arms.

Chodko Jurewicz (Ukrainian: Ходько Юрійович, Lithuanian: Chodka (Katkus) Jurgaitis; fl. c. 1400–1447) was a Ruthenian noble from the Grand Duchy of Lithuania. He is considered to be the founder of the Chodkiewicz family. Chodko was a historical person, but his obscure origin and biography have long been surrounded by legends and disputed by scholars. Chodko Jurewicz died after 1447 and was succeeded by his son Ivan Chodkiewicz.

== Historical biography ==
There is no reliable information regarding Chodko's ancestry. His patronymic name Jurewicz is derived from George (Polish: Jerzy, Lithuanian: Jurgis, Ruthenian: Yuri). According to Polish historian Adam Boniecki, Chodko might be derived from Chodor and could be a broken form of Feodor (Theodore). Traditionally it was believed that Chodko was Eastern Orthodox and hailed from Kiev. This belief was taken from a bitter 1567 letter by Ivan Dmitrovich Belski addressed to Hrehory Chodkiewicz where Hrehory was reminded that the Chodkiewicz family used to be dukes of Kiev. However, this likely referred to rivalry between Hrehory's grandfather Ivan Chodkiewicz and Feodor Ivanovich Belski for the Kiev Voivodeship and not to the ancestral possessions of Chodko. Analysis of estate records indicated that Chodko had possessions in the area of Hrodna, Gródek, and Supraśl.

Chodko was first mentioned in written sources in 1422, when he (as Thoyto or Choyto) signed the Treaty of Melno. At the time he was a regent in Polotsk. Among some 120 witnesses to the treaty, Chodko was 104th. Lithuanian historian Genutė Kirkienė noted that in 1415 a certain Chodconi was sent on a diplomatic mission by Grand Duke Vytautas to Jogaila, King of Poland. She suggested that Chodconi and Chodko were the same person and the mission was the early career of the rising noble. In 1431 Chodko was part of a Lithuanian delegation to Jogaila, King of Poland. In June 1431 he witnessed the Treaty of Christmemel between Švitrigaila and the Teutonic Knights. The treaty created an anti-Polish alliance and began the Polish–Teutonic War (1431–1435). Of the nine Lithuanian witnesses, Chodko (as Thudko Juriowicz) was seventh and the only Ruthenian.

But about a year later, Chodko supported Sigismund Kęstutaitis in his coup d'état against Švitrigaila. On 8 December 1432, Chodka fought in the Battle of Ashmyany alongside Švitrigaila and was taken prisoner. Most likely that was a different Chodka, who remained loyal to Švitrigaila until 1446. In February 1434, Chodko Jurewicz witnessed the renewal of the Union of Grodno by Sigismund Kęstutaitis and Jogaila. Of 41 seals affixed to the treaty, Chodko's Kościesza coat of arms was 9th. It is unclear how he obtained the Polish arms. According to the Union of Horodło, 47 Lithuanian nobles adopted Polish coats of arms. However, Eastern Orthodox nobles from Ruthenia were excluded. Chodko remained influential in domestic politics and along with voivodes of Trakai and Vilnius distributed veldamai (a class of dependent peasants) to other nobles. His name disappeared from written sources in 1447.

== Legendary accounts ==
The historiography has long held that the Chodkiewicz family was of Lithuanian origin. The first author to ascertain the Lithuanian origin was Augustinus Rotundus, a 16th-century researcher of Lithuanian history and diplomacy. In 1564 he wrote that the Chodkiewich family was an old and respected Lithuanian family, founded by Chodko. According to Rotundus, Chodko carried a Lithuanian Grand Duke on his shoulders from a battlefield thus savings his lord's life. For this deed, he earned the nickname Chodko (from East Slavic: chodit – walking).

The theory was further developed by Maciej Stryjkowski (ca. 1547–1593) in his epic poem On the beginnings, accounts, virtues, marital and domestic affairs of the famed nations of Lithuania, Samogitia, Ruthenia (Polish: O początkach, wywodach, dzielnościach, sprawach rycerskich i domowych sławnego narodu litewskiego, żemojdzkiego i ruskiego). According to the poem, an envoy from the Golden Horde asked Grand Duke Gediminas (ruled 1316–1341) for a duel with a Lithuanian warrior. In the case of the Lithuanian victory, Gediminas would stop paying tribute to the Tatar Khan. Samogitian Borejko (Lithuanian: Bareika) won the challenge and was generously rewarded by the Grand Duke. Later Chodko, one of the four sons of Borejko, commanded a raid against the Teutonic Knights in 1311. The Lithuanians suffered a defeat and Gediminas's son Algirdas was injured. Chodko rescued Algirdas and tended his wounds. For this deed Chodko was awarded lands between the Narew and Neman Rivers.

Stryjkowski's work was ordered by the Radziwiłł and Chodkiewicz families. Thus it was very favorable to them and served their political interest. It is clear that the Chodkiewicz family wanted to established their noble pedigree since the beginning of the 14th century. More specifically, Jan Hieronimowicz Chodkiewicz wanted to show his ancestral ties with the Duchy of Samogitia, where he and his father Hieronim Chodkiewicz served as elders.

Later writers and historians copied the story from Stryjkowski with various modifications. For example, Bartosz Paprocki (1543–1614) treated Barejko and Chodko as one person; Wojciech Wijuk Kojałowicz (1609–1677) claimed it was Grand Duke Vytenis and not Gediminas who organized the duel with a Tatar and that Chodko rescued Vytenis not from a battlefield but from a hunting accident. The tale survived in the history books until the end of the 19th century when it was rejected as a legend by critically minded historians.
