= Shchytkavichy =

Agrotown in Minsk Region, Belarus

Shchytkavichy Шчыткавічы (Belarusian) Щитковичи (Russian)
- Agrotown
- Location within Belarus
- Coordinates: 53°13′00″N 27°58′59″E
- Country: Belarus
- Region: Minsk Region
- District: Staryya Darohi District
- Time zone: UTC+3 (MSK)

Shchytkavichy or Shchitkovichi (Belarusian: Шчыткавічы, romanized: Ščytkavičy; Russian: Щитковичи; Polish: Szczytkowicze) is an agrotown in Staryya Darohi District, Minsk Region, Belarus. It serves as the administrative center of Shchytkavichy selsoviet.

== Toponymy ==
The suffix -vichi or -wicze, derived from Old Polish, indicates that this is a patronymic name. The lexical morpheme of a patronymic name could be the name of a father's office or ancestors or the name or surname of a patron (e.g. the Polish surname Szczytko).

== History ==
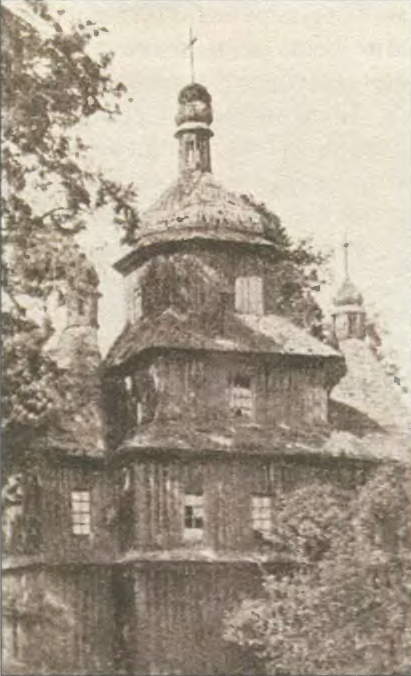
Saints Cosmas and Damian's Eastern Orthodox Church in Shchitkovichi, photographed in 1912.

The village was mentioned in 1433 as part of the Grand Duchy of Lithuania. According to Matvei Lyubavsky, Shchytkavichy was then part of the Principality of Slutsk, a magnate state of Olelkovich dukes, descendants from the Lithuanian Gediminids (male line) and Ruthenian Rurikids (female line). The Slutsk dukes ruled with the help of a boyar "duma", and their fiefs were knyazs, boyars and veldamai, who received landownership for their military or administrative service.

Since 1567, Shchytkavichy was a part of the Porzecze estate in the Minsk province. From 1588, part of the Koidanova estate (now Dzyarzhynsk), belonging to the family estate of the Radziwiłłs of the Trąby coat of arms. In 1791−1793, it was part of the Novogródek Voivodeship. From 1793 in the Russian Empire. From 1800 a village in Igumen county. In the second half of the 19th century, Marie von Sayn-Wittgenstein-Sayn, Duchess of Hohenlohe, daughter of Stefania Radziwiłł and Ludwig zu Sayn-Wittgenstein-Berleburg, sold the territory of the former Principality of Slutsk (including Shchytkavichy) under pressure of Tsar Alexander III of Russia.

Shchytkavichy was a village and a folwark. The Central Archives of Historical Records in Warsaw store architectural drawings of the folwark and the village of Szczytkowicze, dated between 1815 and 1873. The Geographical Dictionary of the Kingdom of Poland (Volume 10th, page 527) mentions: Sielec, a large swamp on the southern edge of the Igumen county, in the area between the villages Szczytkowicze and Porzecze, belongs to the Porzecze Radziwiłł estate, in the Omelno municipality.

In 1919, Shchytkavichy became part of the Belarusian Soviet Socialist Republic, and from 1959 it was a village. Since 25 August 1991, Shchytkavichy has belonged to the Republic of Belarus; on 8 October 2010; the village received the status of an agrotown.
