= Nowogródek Voivodeship =

Nowogródek Voivodeship can refer to:

- Nowogródek Voivodeship (1507–1795) in the Polish–Lithuanian Commonwealth
- Nowogródek Voivodeship (1919–1939) in the Second Polish Republic
