= Jan Kazimierz Chodkiewicz =

Polish–Lithuanian nobleman (1616–1660)

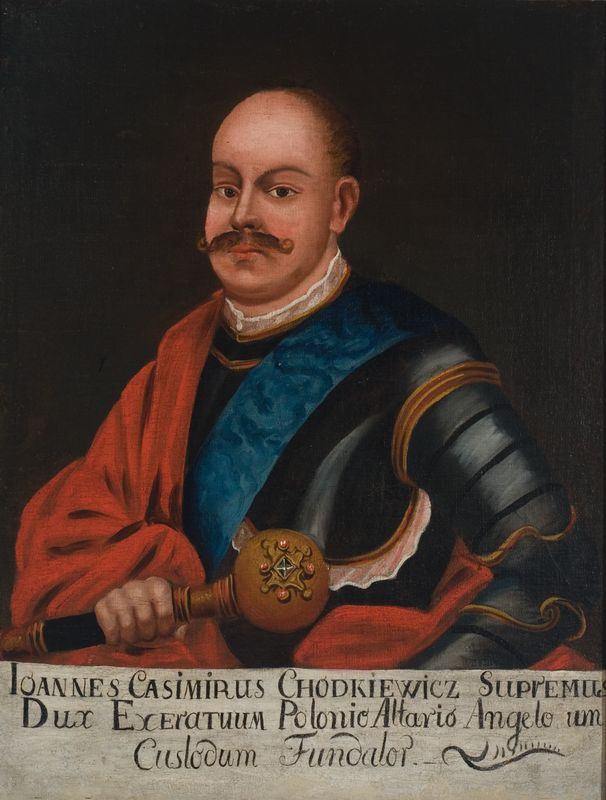

- Coat of arms: Kościesza odm.Chodkiewicz
- Born: 1616
- Died: 30 April 1660 (aged 43–44)
- Family: Chodkiewicz
- Consort: Zofia Pac
- Issue: Jerzy Karol Chodkiewicz; Teresa Chodkiewicz; Anna Chodkiewicz; Michał Konstanty Chodkiewicz
- Father: Krzysztof Chodkiewicz
- Mother: Elżbieta Kiszka

Jan Kazimierz Chodkiewicz (Lithuanian: Jonas Kazimieras Chodkevičius; 1616 – 13 March 1660) was a Polish–Lithuanian nobleman (szlachcic).

== Life ==
Chodkiewicz was born in 1616.

Jan Kazimierz was Master of the Stables of Lithuania from 20 July 1633 and castellan of Vilnius from 13 April 1646. He married Zofia Pac on 31 August 1636 in Vilnius.

He died on 13 March 1660 in Königsberg, and was buried in Vyalikaya Byerastavitsa, Grand Duchy of Lithuania (now in Belarus).

== See also ==
- Lithuanian nobility

== Sources ==
- Hrytskyevich, Anatol (2005). "Хадкевіч". Вялікае княства Літоўскае: Энцыклапедыя — Т. 2: Кадэцкі корпус — Яцкевіч. Minsk: Беларуская Энцыклапедыя. pp. 709–711. ISBN 985-11-0378-0.
