= Aleksander Słuszka =

Polish–Lithuanian noble (1580–1647)

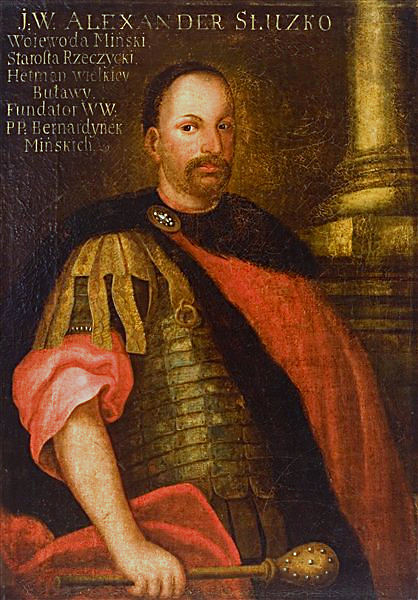
- Born: 1580
- Died: 1647 (aged 66–67)

Ostoja

Aleksander Słuszka (1580–1647), of Clan Ostoja, was a Polish–Lithuanian nobleman (szlachcic) and politician. He was the starost of Rzeczyca (Rechytsa), Homel (Gomel), Mazyr (Mozyr) and Łojów (Loyew). He was also the castellan of Minsk (1626), the voivode of Minsk (1635), Nowogródek (Navahrudak) (1636), Troki (Trakai) (1642–1647), and marshal of the Lithuanian Tribunal in 1631.

Raised in a Calvinist family, in 1621 he and his wife converted to Roman Catholicism. From then on, a devout Catholic, he funded two monasteries and two churches.

== Bibliography ==
- Urzędnicy Wielkiego Księstwa Litewskiego, t. 2, Województwo trockie XIV-XVIII wiek, pod redakcją Andrzeja Rachuby, Warszawa 2009, s. 651.
- Artur Walden, Marszałkowie świeccy Trybunału Głównego Wielkiego Księstwa Litewskiego w latach 1633–1648, w: Czasopismo Prawno-Historyczne, t. LXV, 2013, z. 1, s. 169.
- http://www.bilp.uw.edu.pl/ti/1861/foto/nn59.htm Tygodnik Ilustrowany, 1861
- Herbarz Kaspra Niesieckiego, s.414
- Volumina Legum, t. 3, Petersburg 1859, s. 277.
- Volumina Legum, t. III, Petersburg 1859, s. 377.
- Volumina Legum, t. III, Petersburg 1859, s. 398.
- Suffragia Woiewodztw y Ziem Koronnych, y W. X. Litewskiego, Zgodnie ná Naiásnieyssego Władisława Zygmunta ... roku 1632 ... Woiewodztwo Krákowskie., [b.n.s.]

== See also ==
- Ostoja coat of arms
- Clan of Ostoja
