= Tikhon of Kaluga =

Saint Tikhon of Kaluga
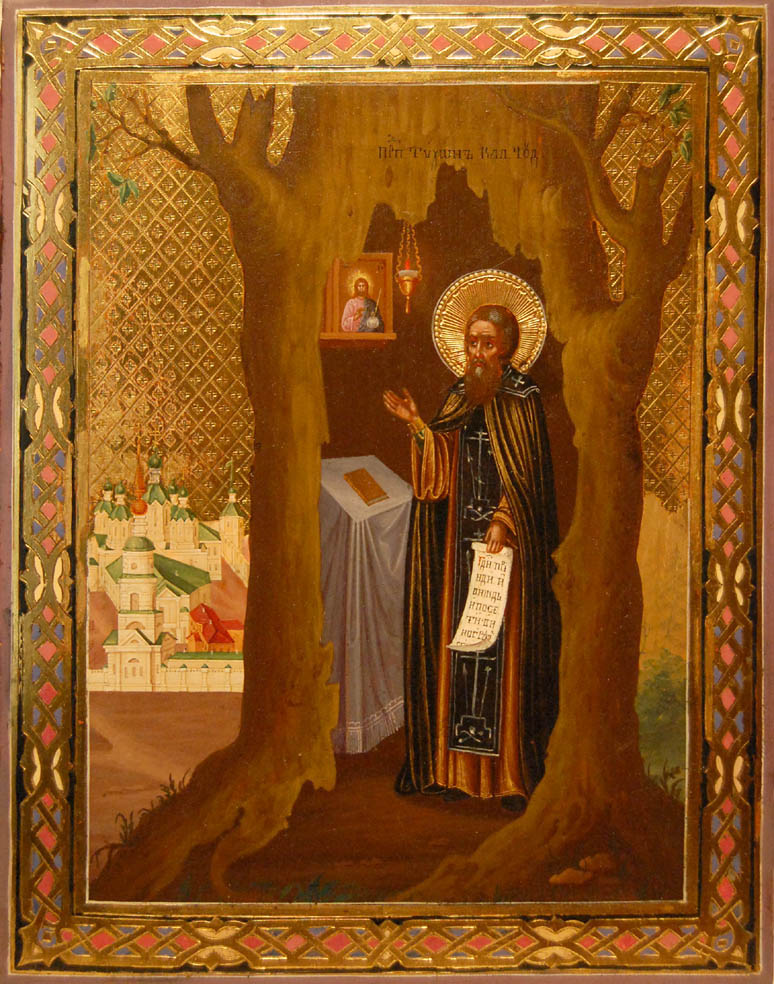
- Icon of Saint Tikhon in his monastic cell

Hegumen, Venerable
- Born: late 14th century or early 15th century
- Died: 16 June 1492
- Honored in: Eastern Orthodox Church
- Canonized: 1584
- Feast: 16 June

Tikhon of Kaluga (died 16 June 1492) was a Russian Orthodox hegumen and saint. He grew up in Moscow and was tonsured a monk as a young man. He then moved to a forest near Medin in Kaluga, living in the hollow of an oak tree. It was on that spot that he founded (and became the first hegumen of) a monastery dedicated to the Dormition of the Mother of God (and then to Tikhon himself after his death). He is commemorated with a feast day on 16 June in the Eastern Orthodox Church.
