= Gródek, Białystok County =

Gródek
- Village
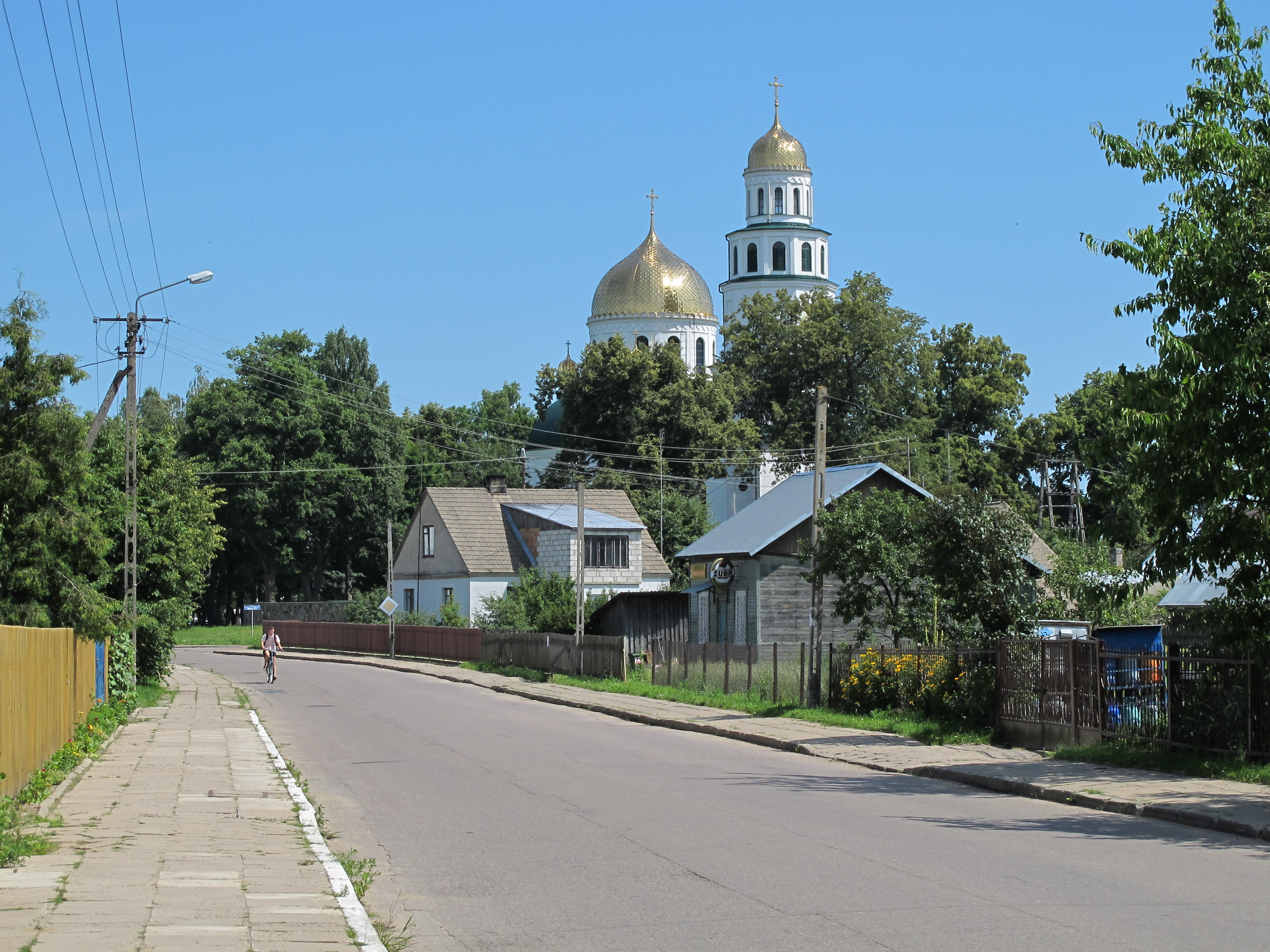
- Center of Gródek, in the background Orthodox church of the Nativity of the Blessed Virgin Mary

- Location within Poland
- Coordinates: 53°5′48″N 23°39′24″E
- Country: Poland
- Voivodeship: Podlaskie
- County: Białystok
- Gmina: Gródek
- Population: 2,900

Gródek [ˈɡrudɛk] (Belarusian: Гарадок) is a village in Białystok County, Podlaskie Voivodeship, in north-eastern Poland, close to the border with Belarus. It is the seat of the gmina (administrative district) called Gmina Gródek. The Supraśl River, a tributary of the Narew, flows through the village.

== History ==
The history of the town is connected with the Chodkiewicz family. In the 15th century, a castle stood on a hill in the meadows. In 1498, Aleksander Chodkiewicz founded an Orthodox monastery here, which was moved to Supraśl a few years later. In the mid-16th century, the town received city rights. In the 17th and 18th centuries, Gródek passed successively into the hands of the Pac, Sapieha and Radziwiłł families. At the end of the 18th century, it was a magnate town of the Zabłudów county in the Grodno district of the Trakai voivodeship of the Grand Duchy of Lithuania. In 1897, Gródek lost its city rights. According to the General Census of 1921, it was inhabited by 2,081 people, of whom 45 were Roman Catholic, 512 Orthodox, 2 Evangelical and 1,508 Jews. 15 residents were described as non-denominational. At the same time, 227 residents declared Polish nationality, 437 Belarusian, 1 German and 1,416 Jewish. There were 350 residential buildings in Grodek.

In the interwar period, there were several textile factories, carpentry shops, a tile factory and a brickyard in the town.

== Jews ==
Jews settled in Gródek in the mid-17th century. The inventory from 1677 mentioned, among other things, a "Jewish school square", so a synagogue already existed at that time. In 1789, out of 275 inhabitants of Grodek, there were 24 Jewish families. In 1799, out of 472 citizens, there were 93 Jews, in 1807, despite the decline in the city's population (335), the Jewish population numbered 164 people. In 1847, the Grodek Synagogue District numbered 454 Jews. In 1878, there were 1,340, and in 1897 as many as 2,513 Jews (78.3%). The first censuses in reborn Poland showed: in 1921 - 1508, and in 1931 - 1385 Jews. The largest concentration of Jewish houses and squares was located on Michalowska Street (3 synagogues), in the market area (main synagogue) and on Zarzeczanska and Fabryczna (Swierczewskiego) streets. The second religious center was located across the river. The Jewish bathhouse was located just behind the main synagogue. In total, there were 5 synagogues in Gródek, including 1 brick one: "Ohel Jakoowa", "Altfrankische", "Habanim", "Lunski Bet Midrasz", the Piaskowa synagogue and 2 Hasidic prayer houses: Klaus Kobrynski and Klaus Slonimski. The Jewish cemetery was in the northern part of the city. The famous rabbi Bernard Rosenblatt was born in Gródek in 1886. The last rabbis were Nisan Brojde and Abram Zelig Syjon.

Before World War II, more than half of Gródek's residents were Jews. There were several wooden synagogues in the town. In August 1941, the Germans established a ghetto for the Jewish population there. It occupied the area in the area of the streets: Zarzeczańska, Cmentarna and Fabryczna. About 2,500 Jews were sent to the ghetto, who worked, among other things, on road construction and unloading and loading wagons at the nearby railway station in Waliły. The ghetto was liquidated on November 2, 1942, and its inhabitants were deported to a transit camp in Białystok. During the liquidation of the ghetto, 40 people were murdered. The Jews of Gródek were deported from Białystok and murdered in the Treblinka extermination camp.
