= Belsky family (Gediminid) =

The Belsky or Belski family (Russian: Бельский; plural: Бельские) was a Ruthenianized princely family of Gediminid origin in the Grand Duchy of Lithuania. It later defected to the Grand Duchy of Moscow and played a key role during the regency of Ivan IV of Russia. The family started with Ivan Vladimirovich, son of Vladimir Olgerdovich and grandson of Algirdas, and ended with Ivan Dmitrievich Belsky in 1571. The Belsky name was derived from their principal possession of Bely, Tver Oblast.

== First princes ==
Ivan Vladimirovich was first mentioned in written sources as a witness to the 1422 Treaty of Melno. After the death of Grand Duke Vytautas in 1430, Ivan was involved in the ensuing power struggle. Initially he supported Švitrigaila and witnessed the anti-Polish Treaty of Christmemel with the Teutonic Knights. However, he changed sides and actively supported the 1432 coup against Švitrigaila in favor of Sigismund Kęstutaitis. He then changed sides again and fought against Sigismund in the decisive Battle of Wiłkomierz in 1435. Ivan was taken prisoner during the battle. Around 1444, he was invited by the Novgorod Republic to govern their city. However, his reign lasted only about a year and his further fate is unknown. Ivan married Vasilisa Olshanska, sister of Queen of Poland Sophia of Halshany. They had three sons – Ivan (married Princess Vorotynska), Simeon (married to daughter of Yury Patrikeyevich and Maria Vasilievna), Feodor – and three daughters. The daughters were married to Bolesław II of Cieszyn, to Ivan Ostrogski, and to the voivode of Kiev Ivan Chodkiewicz.

Of all three sons, only Feodor Ivanovich Belsky is known to have left children. In 1481, Feodor, Mikhailo Olelkovich, and Iwan Olshanski-Dubrovicki planned a coup against Grand Duke Casimir IV Jagiellon. Their plans were divulged; Mikhailo and Iwan were executed while Feodor succeeded in escaping to the Grand Duchy of Moscow. His wife, Princess Kobrynska, who he had married but several months before the coup, was left in Lithuania. Feodor Belski lived at the Muscovite court until 1493, when he was implicated in the so-called Lukomsky Conspiracy to murder Ivan III. He was banished to Galich, but a year later he was pardoned and regained royal favor. Ivan III personally demanded from Alexander of Lithuania to hand over Belsky's wife to him. Seeing no prospect of success, the Russian sovereign consulted the metropolitan and they declared Feodor's previous marriage null and void. Belsky then married Ivan's own niece, Anna of Ryazan, daughter of Vasily Tretnoy and Anna of Ryazan. At the wedding, Feodor was rewarded with extensive votchinas along the Volga River, which would remain with his family until the Oprichnina. In 1499, he was involved in the politics of the Khanate of Kazan, hoping to install a khan backed by Moscow. He was last mentioned in the Russian chronicles in 1506, and it seems likely that he died shortly thereafter. Feodor's three sons Dmitry, Ivan and Simeon, being Vasily III's cousins, took a key part in the events of his reign and the following regency.

Feodor's elder brother, Simeon Ivanovich Belsky, left Lithuania for the Grand Duchy of Moscow in his brother's wake in 1500, citing the persecution of Orthodox believers as his reason. His defection intensified anti-Lithuanian rhetoric in Russia, which proclaimed itself a defender of all Orthodox believers, and hastened the renewed Muscovite–Lithuanian War. The war ended in 1503; Lithuania suffered large territorial losses, which included not only to Bely but also Chernigov, Starodub, and Homel. Thus the Belsky family regained its patrimony.

== Kazan campaigns ==
Dmitry Feodorovich Belsky (1499–1551) was first recorded in 1519, when he enthroned Shahgali as the khan of Kazan. Two years later, the Crimean khan had Shahgali replaced with his own brother, defeated Belsky's army on the banks of the Oka River and devastated the area between Moscow and Kolomna. While Belsky retreated to the stronghold of Serpukhov, his absence from the capital left the field free for mutual jealousies and accusations. Although the majority of boyars complained about Belsky's cowardice, the monarch spared both Belsky and his own brother and put the blame for defeat on Prince Vorotynsky.

Dmitry's younger brother, Ivan Feodorovich Belsky, while still in his early 20s, led the 150,000-strong Russian army against Kazan in 1524. Belsky's huge army spent 20 days encamped at the island opposite Kazan, awaiting the arrival of Russian cavalry. Then the news came that part of cavalry had been defeated, and the vessels loaded with provisions had been captured by the Tatars. Although the army suffered from hunger, Belsky at once laid siege to the city and soon the Tatars sent their envoys proposing terms. Belsky accepted them and speedily returned to Moscow. Many boyars proceeded to accuse him of treason, but modern historians agree there was little he could achieve without provisions, being pressed to repel continuous attacks by Tatar and Udmurt cavalry. Matters then remained quiet until 1530, when Ivan Belsky, still eager to revenge himself, returned with the Russian army to the walls of Kazan. On 10 July, the fortress was taken and the Tatars sued for peace, promising to accept any khan appointed from Moscow.

== Heyday and regency ==
During Vasily III's fatal illness, Dmitry Belsky remained at his deathbed until the final hour. He was present when Vasily signed a testament proclaiming Michael Glinski and himself tutors to young Ivan IV. After Grand Prince's death, a political struggle erupted between his widow Elena Glinskaya and his brother Yury of Dmitrov, with whom the Belskys were on friendly terms. Yuri was executed in 1534 on charges of treason, while Ivan Belsky was thrown into prison. Anticipating further repressions, the youngest of brothers, Simeon Feodorovich Belsky, escaped to the Grand Duchy of Lithuania. He was warmly welcomed by Sigismund the Old, at once joining the king's hostilities against Russia. When the war turned unsuccessful, the Lithuanian generals put the blame on Belsky and other Russian defectors. On this event, Simeon Belsky fled to Constantinople. In 1537, he appeared in the Crimea, with the purpose of escalating military tensions with Russia. Not only he failed in his designs, but was kidnapped by a ruler of the Nogai Horde, from whom he was later ransomed by the khan.

In 1538, the regent Elena Glinskaya died, probably poisoned by the Shuiskys. They at once liberated Ivan Belsky from his prison and restituted him to the Boyar Duma. Thenceforward the regency become a story of intrigues between the Belskys and the Shuiskys. In 1540, Ivan Belsky was again thrown into prison, only to be released several months later, after the death of Vasily "Nemoy" Shuisky and on petition from Metropolitan Joasaphus. Belsky's power reached its peak in 1541, when he was installed as Ivan IV's "prime advisor" (первосоветник). Among his first enterprises was a letter to the Crimean khan asking him to bring Simeon Belsky to Moscow. The khan, persuaded by Simeon that Moscow stood completely unfortified and desiring to profit from the attendant disorder, advanced with his guards towards the Russian capital. His hope of putting Moscow to the sword proved ill-founded, however, and he retreated on espying the first contingent of the Russian soldiers and taking Simeon Belsky back with him. Simeon's subsequent fate in unknown.

In the meantime, Ivan Shuisky boycotted the royal palace and the Boyar Duma until 3 January 1542, when his soldiers broke into Belsky's house at night and took Ivan Belsky into custody. This time Belsky was immured in the distant Kirillov Monastery, where the Shuiskys had him strangled in May 1542. Ivan left no children by his wife, Daniil Shchenya's granddaughter. Writing several decades later, Prince Kurbsky described Ivan Belsky as the boldest commander and the cleverest politician of Muscovy.

== The last Belskys ==
Dmitry Belsky managed to eschew repressions that befell his brothers, and he even increased his influence in the Boyar Duma. After the regency was abolished, Ivan IV at once resumed military operations against the Khanate of Kazan. In 1547, Dmitry Belsky was commanded to reinstate Shahgali as the khan. Two years later, the tsar and Belsky led the Russian armies to take Kazan. They were forced to retreat, suffering heavy casualties. Belsky was again accused by fellow boyars of poor leadership, but he unexpectedly died on 13 January 1551.

By his wife, Ivan Chelyadnin's daughter, Dmitry had two daughters, Eudoxia and Anastasia. They were married to the boyars Mikhail Morozov and Vasily Zakharyin-Yuriev, respectively. Eudoxia, although renowned for her pious ways, was executed with her husband and children during the Oprichnina purges. Dmitry also had one son, Prince Ivan Dmitrievich Belsky. When the Oprichnina was instituted, the tsar had his two noblest boyars, Ivan Belsky and Fyodor Mstislavsky, appointed to run the lands of the state, or zemshchina. On 8 November 1555 the last Prince Belsky married Marfa, a posthumous daughter of Prince Vasily Shuisky-Nemoy by Anastasia of Kazan, herself a granddaughter of Ivan III and Sophia Paleologue. Ivan Belsky and Marfa Shuiskaya had five children but they all died in minority and were interred in the family sepulcher, Tikhon's Hermitage near Kaluga. In 1571, when khan Devlet I Giray of Crimea assaulted Moscow and set the city on fire, Prince Belsky suffocated from smoke in his own mansion. With his death, the Belsky princely family became extinct.
