= List of voivodes of Kiev =

This the list of voivodes of Kiev. A Kiev voivode (Polish: wojewoda kijowski) was the major administrative position in Kiev Voivodship, in the Grand Duchy of Lithuania from 1471 until 1569 and in the Crown of the Kingdom of Poland from 1569 until 1793.

In the 15–16th centuries, all of the voivodes were of Lithuanian or Ruthenian origin, such as Holszański and Radziwiłł families. Later voivodes came from the Polish-Ruthenian noble Houses Ostrogski and Zasławski and for short period Movilești (Lozynski). From the beginning of the 17th century, the voivodes were chosen for the office mostly from the Polish House Potocki.

== Grand Duchy of Lithuania (1471–1569) ==
- Martynas Goštautas (Marcin Gasztołd) (1471–1475)
- Ivan Chodkiewicz (Jonas Ivanas Chodkevičius) (1480–1484)
- Jerzy Pac (Jurgis Pacas) (1486–1492)
- Dymitr Putiatycz (Dmytro Putyatych) (1492–1505)
- Jerzy Montowtowicz (Jurgis Montovtt) (1505–1508)
- Jan Gliński (Jonas Glinskis, Ivan Hlynsky) (1508)
- Jerzy Holszański (Jurgis Alšėniškis, Yuriy Olshansky) (1508–1511)
- Jerzy Radziwiłł (Jurgis Radvila) (1511–1514)
- Andrzej Niemirowicz (Andriy Nemyrych) (1514–1541)
- Jan Holszański (Ivan Olshansky) (1542–1544)
- Fryderyk Proński (Semen Hlebovych Pronsky, Frederikas Prunskis) (1545–1555)
- Hrehory Chodkiewicz (Grigorijus Chodkevičius) (1555–1559)
- Konstanty Wasyl Ostrogski (Kostiantyn Vasyl Ostrozky) (1559–1569)

== Crown of the Kingdom of Poland (1569–1793) ==
- Konstanty Wasyl Ostrogski (1559–1608)
- Stanisław Żółkiewski (1608–1618)
- Tomasz Zamoyski (1619–1628)
- Aleksander Zasławski (1629)
- Stefan Chmielecki (1629–1630)
- Janusz Tyszkiewicz (1630–1649)
- Adam Kisiel (1650–1653)
  - since 1654 in Zhytomyr
- Stanisław Rewera Potocki (1655–1658)
- Jan Zamoyski (1658–1659)
- Jan Wyhowski (1659–1664)
- Stefan Czarniecki (1664–1665)
- Michał Stanisławski (1665–1668)
- Andrzej Potocki (1668–1681)
- Feliks Kazimierz Potocki (1682)
- Stefan Niemirycz (1682–1684)
- Marcin Kątski (1684–1702)
- Józef Potocki (1702–1744)
- Stanisław Potocki (1744–1756)
- Franciszek Salezy Potocki (1756–1772)
- Stanisław Lubomirski (1772–1785)
- Józef Gabriel Stempkowski (1785–1791)
- Antoni Protazy Potocki (1791–1793)

== Muscovy ==
- Boyar Feodor Kurakin (1653), siege voivode
- Vasiliy Buturlin (1654), envoy to the Pereyaslav Council
- Andrei Buturlin (1656–1658)
- Boyar Vasiliy Sheremetev (1658–1660)
- Prince Yury Baryatinsky (1658–1663), comrade to Vasiliy Sheremetev (1658–1660) and Grigoriy Kurakin (1662–1663)
- Ivan Chaadayev (1658–1661, 1663–1665)
- Ivan Rzhevskiy (1661), siege voivode
- Prince Nikita Lvov (1665–1666)
- Vasiliy Sheremetev (1665–1669)
- Peotr Sheremetev Senior (1665–1669)
- Prince Grigoriy Kozlovskiy (1669–1673), first voivode
- Prince Yuriy Trubetskoy (1673–1679)
- Prince Daniil Veliko-Gagin (1672–1674)
- Prince Aleksei Golitsyn (1675–1676)
- Prince Ivan Troyekurov (1678–1680), first voivode
- Daniil Baryatinsky (1678–1682), second voivode
- Ivan Khitrovo Senior (1679–1681)
- Yeremei Pashkov (1680–1683), third voivode
- Leontiy Neplyuyev (1681)
- Peotr Prozorovskiy Junior (1682–1683), first voivode
- Boyar Feodor Sheremetev (1684–????), first voivode
- Boyar Feodor Saltykov
- Ivan Buturlin (1688–1689)
- Prince Mikhail Romodanovskiy (1689–1692)
- Prince Luka Dolgorukov (1691–1693)
- Prince Peotr Khovanskiy Senior (1693–1696)
