= Nowogródek Voivodeship (1507–1795) =

Voivodeship of the Grand Duchy of Lithuania

Coordinates: 53°36′06″N 25°49′38″E

Nowogródek Voivodeship Polish: Województwo nowogródzkie Latin: Palatinatus Novogrodensis
- Voivodeship of the Grand Duchy of Lithuania
- 1507–1795
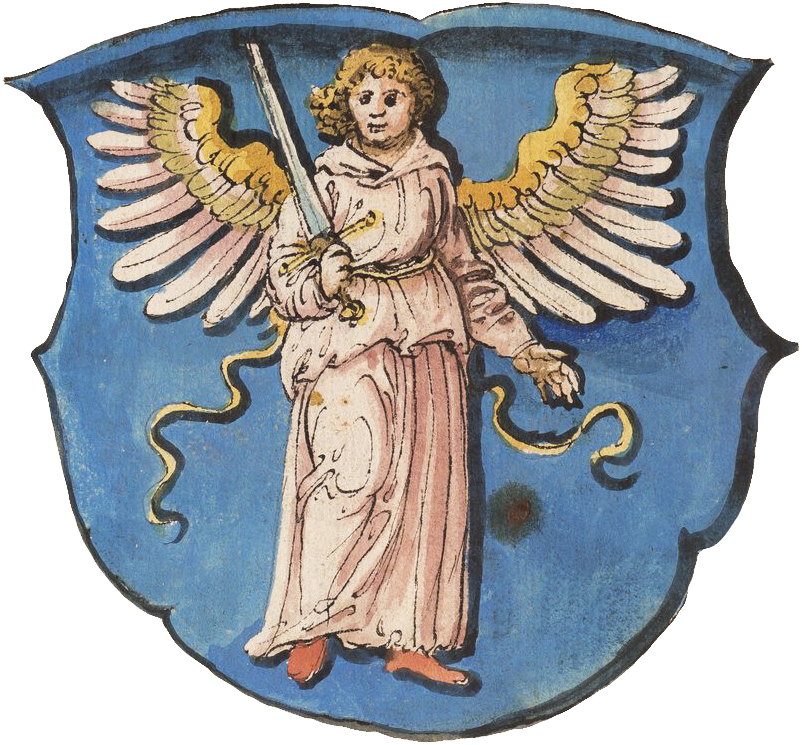
- Coat of arms

- The Nowogródek Voivodeship within the Polish–Lithuanian Commonwealth in 1619
- Capital: Nowogródek
- Area
- 33,200 km^{2} (12,800 sq mi)
- History
  - Established: 1507
  - Third partition of the Polish–Lithuanian Commonwealth: 1795
- Contained within
  - Country: Grand Duchy of Lithuania (1507–1569); Polish–Lithuanian Commonwealth (1569–1795)
  - Member state: Grand Duchy of Lithuania (1569–1795)
- Political subdivisions: counties: three, and the Duchy of Sluck and Kopyl
Preceded by	Succeeded by
Trakai Voivodeship	Russian Empire

Nowogródek Voivodeship (Polish: województwo nowogródzkie; Latin: Palatinatus Novogrodensis; Lithuanian: Naugarduko vaivadija; Belarusian: Наваградзкае ваяводзтва) was a voivodeship of the Grand Duchy of Lithuania from 1507 to 1795, with the capital in the town of Nowogródek (now Novogrudok, Belarus). Since 1569 it was located in the Polish–Lithuanian Commonwealth, as part of Lithuania.

== History ==
The Voivodeship was composed of three counties, Novogrudok, Vawkavysk, Slonim, as well as the Duchy of Slutsk. It had two senators, two deputies for the Sejm, and two deputies for the Lithuanian Tribunal. Its capital was the town of Nyazvizh with the Radziwiłł family's castle and treasury. Novogrudok Voivodeship ceased to exist along with the Polish-Lithuanian state when it was partitioned out of existence.

Zygmunt Gloger in his monumental book Historical Geography of the Lands of Old Poland provides this description of the Nowogródek Voivodeship:

Slavic lands along the upper Neman, after collapse of the Kievan Rus’ were in 1241 ransacked by the forces of the Mongol Empire, under Batu Khan. After the Mongol raid, it turned into a desert, and was annexed by the Grand Duchy of Lithuania. In c. 1500, local Lithuanian dukes were named voivodes, thus Nowogródek Voivodeship was created. Like the neighbouring Brest Litovsk Voivodeship, Nowogródek Voivodeship was rather narrow but very long, stretching from the upper Narew and Białowieża Forest, to the spot where the Ptsich flows into the Pripyat (...)

Nowogródek Voivodeship was divided into three counties: those of Nowogródek, Wolkowysk, and Slonim. Furthermore, it included the Duchy of Sluck and Kapyl. Each county had its own sejmik, with each electing two deputies to the Sejm, and two to the Lithuanian Tribunal. It had only two senators, who were the Voivode and the Castellan of Nowogródek (...) Northern part of the voivodeship, mainly the County of Nowogródek and the Duchy of Sluck were among most fertile lands in Lithuania, with hilly landscape and several beautiful towns, such as Tuhanowicze, Switez and Woroncza.

== Gallery ==
The coat of arms and flag of Navahrudak Voivodeship

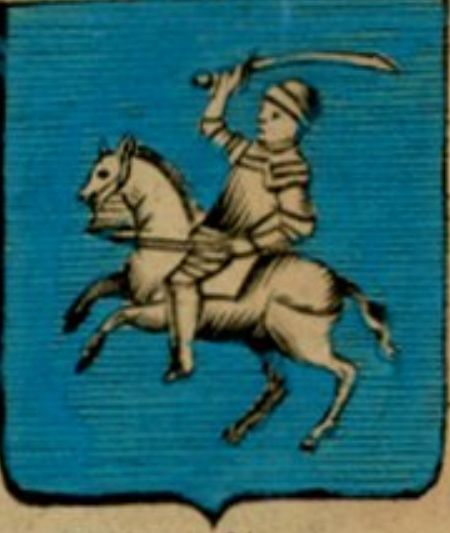
The Voivodeship's coat of arms in 1712

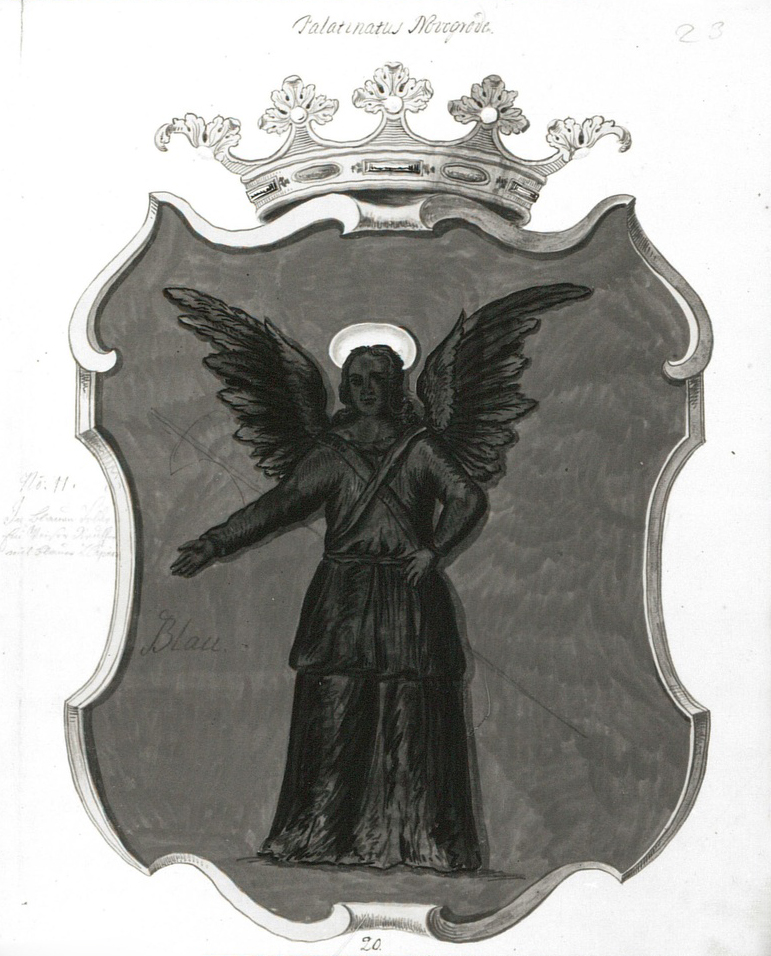
The Voivodeship's coat of arms in 1720

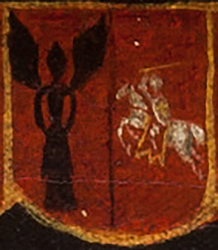
The Voivodeship's coat of arms in 1794

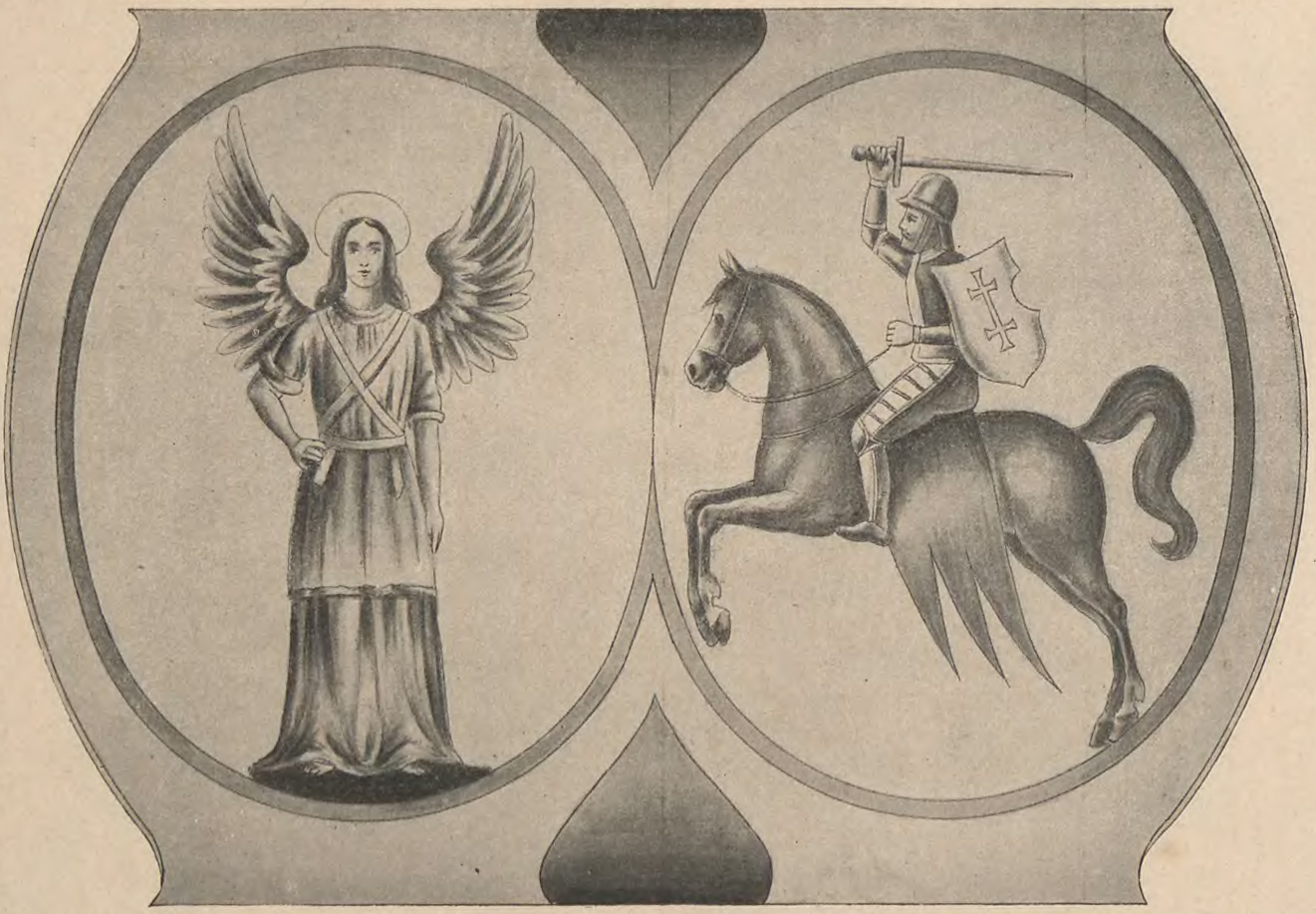
The Voivodeship's coat of arms in the 19th century (reconstruction)

== Voivodes ==
- Martynas Goštautas (Marcin Gasztołdowicz; 1464–1471), appointed by King Casimir Jagiellon
- Albertas Goštautas (1508–1514), to King Sigismund I the Old
- Jan Zabrzeziński (1514–1530)
- Stanislovas Goštautas (Stanisław Gasztołd, 1530–1542), to King Sigismund II Augustus
- Grzegorz Ostik (1542–1544)
- Aleksander Chodkiewicz (1544–1549)
- Alexander Polubinsky (1549–1551)
- Ivan Ermine (1551–1558)
- Paweł Sapieha (1558–1579)
- Mikołaj VII Radziwiłł (1579–1590)
- Teodor Skumin Tyszkiewicz (1590–1618)
- Mikołaj Sapieha (1618–1638), to King Sigismund III Vasa
- Aleksander Słuszka (1638–1643)
- Tomasz Sapieha (I 1643–IV 1646)
- Jury Hreptovich (1646–1650)
- Nicholas Kshiftof Khaletskaya (1650–1653)
- Peter Kazimierz Vezhevich (1653–1658)
- Krzysztof Wołodkowicz (1658–1670)
- Jan Kersnovskaya (1670)
- Dmitrij Polubinsky (1670–1689)
- Alexander Bohuslav Unehovsky (1689)
- Stefan Tyzenhauz (1689–1709)
- Jan Mikołaj Radziwiłł (1709–1729)
- Mikołaj Faustin Radziwiłł (1729–1746)
- Jerzy Radziwiłł (1746–1754)
- Józef Aleksander Jabłonowski (1754–1773)
- Józef Niesiołowski (1773–1795)

== See also ==
- Nowogródek Voivodeship (1919–1939)
