= Ivan Chodkiewicz =

Ruthenian noble (c. 1420 – 1484)

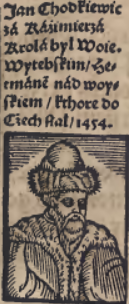
Picture of Ivan Chodkiewicz from Bartosz Paprocki's book "Gniazdo Cnoty"

Ivan Chodkiewicz (Ukrainian: Іван Ходкевич, Belarusian: Іван Хадкевіч, Lithuanian: Ivanas Chodkevičius; c. 1420 – 1484) was a Ruthenian noble from the Grand Duchy of Lithuania. He was a son of Chodko Jurewicz and ancestor of the Chodkiewicz family. Ivan married Jawnuta (Agnieszka) Belska, first cousin of Casimir IV Jagiellon. The marriage into the royal line helped him to obtain positions of starosta of Lutsk (1473) and voivode of Kiev (1480). During a Tatar invasion in 1482, Ivan and his family were taken hostage. Ivan died in captivity while his wife, daughter Agrafena, and son Aleksander Chodkiewicz were ransomed and continued the family line.

== Biography ==
=== Early life ===
Ivan was born around 1420. Traditionally, historiography states that Ivan Chodkiewicz first appears in written sources in 1453 as a member of a Lithuanian delegation sent to the Sejm of the Kingdom of Poland in Parczew. However, this note is based on an unreliable account by Albert Wijuk Kojałowicz. According to Lithuanian historian Genutė Kirkienė, the first reliable mention of Ivan was on 6 June 1459 when he witnessed a treaty. At the time he was starosta of Minsk. He reappeared as a military commander in 1466 during the Thirteen Years' War (1454–1466) between the Kingdom of Poland and the Teutonic Knights. The Grand Duchy of Lithuania declared neutrality and officially did not participate in the war. In 1466, the Knights defended themselves in Chojnice (Konitz) and the siege by Polish troops, commanded by Piotr Dunin, stalled. Polish King and Lithuanian Grand Duke Casimir IV Jagiellon sent reinforcements of 500 Lithuanian and 300 Tatar soldiers, who were commanded by Ivan Chodkiewicz. The Polish–Lithuanian forces succeeded in burning and capturing the city on 28 September 1466.

In 1470, Ivan Chodkiewicz became part of the royal court. In a 23 October 1470 document he was mentioned as court marshal (marszałek hospodarski) and governor of Lida. In this position, which was shared with other people and held by Ivan until 1479, he was responsible for the security of the royal court. Around this time he married Jawnuta (Agnieszka) Belska, daughter of Ivan Vladimirovich Belsky and first cousin of Casimir IV. It is believed that their first son, Aleksander Chodkiewicz, was born around 1475. Kirkienė argued that the wedding was a boost for further career of Ivan, who lost his position in Lida to become a governor of Vitebsk around 1473. (Note: The date is usually given as 1477, when the title was reliably mentioned in a written document.)

=== Later career ===
On 12 October 1474, Ivan Chodkiewicz commanded Lithuanian troops in a battle near Wrocław (Breslau) against Matthias Corvinus of Hungary. Ivan, his otherwise unknown brother Pavel, and eleven other Ruthenian nobles signed a letter to Pope Sixtus IV in 1476, authored by Misail Pstruch, Metropolitan of Kiev. The letter expressed loyalty to the Council of Florence and supported a church union between Catholicism and Eastern Orthodoxy. It also contained complains that the Catholics were discriminating the Orthodoxs and asked the Pope for protection. There are doubts whether the letter was authentic and not a later forgery.

In 1478, Ivan was mentioned as starosta of Lutsk. It was a high-level position in Volhynia, an important region contested between Poland and Lithuania. As starosta, Ivan enacted new taxes that faced resistance and were canceled by his successor. Ivan Chodkiewicz reached the top of his career when he became voivode of Kiev in summer 1480. This upset dynastic interest of the Olelkovych and Belsky families, who could claim ancestry from the ruling Gediminid dynasty and Princes of Kiev. Disappointed by such dynastic policies, Mikhailo Olelkovich with relatives Ivan Olshanski-Dubrovicki and Feodor Ivanovich Belsky planned a coup against Casimir IV in 1481. However, the conspiracy was discovered, possibly by Ivan Chodkiewicz, and Mikhailo and Ivan were executed. Kiev Voivodeship was threatened by the Crimean Khanate under Khan Meñli I Giray. Therefore, it had to have strong and organized military, and Ivan's military experience was useful. However, the Tatars invaded the region and kidnapped Ivan and his family in 1482. Ivan and his daughter (name unknown) died in captivity around 1484, while his wife, son Aleksander, and daughter Agrafena were ransomed.
