= Staryya Darohi district =

District of Minsk region, Belarus

Staryya Darohi district Старадарожскі раён (Belarusian) Стародорожский район (Russian)
- District
- Flag Coat of arms

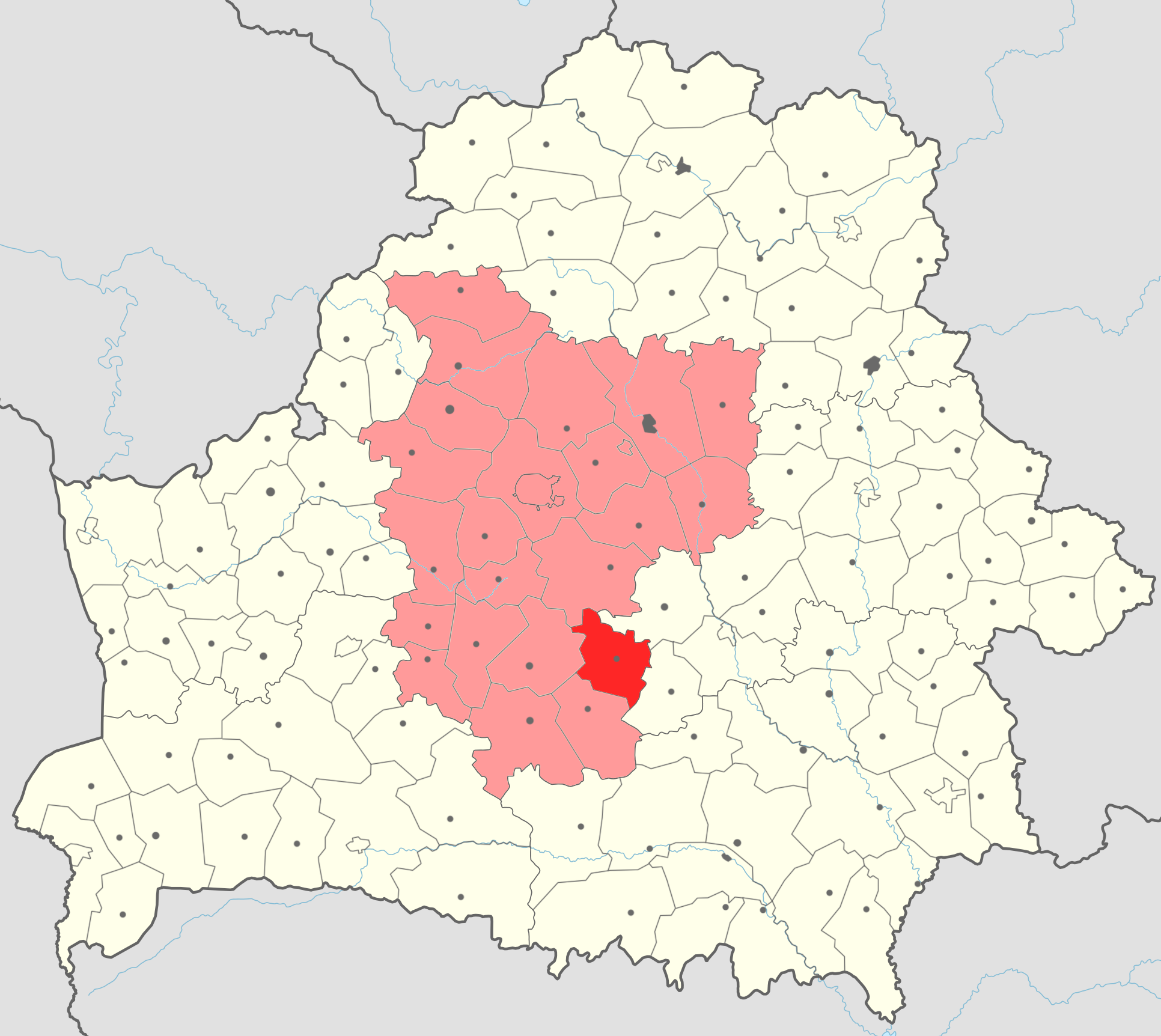
- Coordinates: 53°02′22″N 28°15′54″E
- Country: Belarus
- Region: Minsk region
- Administrative center: Staryya Darohi

Area
  - District: 1,370 km^{2} (530 sq mi)

Population (2024)
  - District: 19,152
  - Density: 14.0/km^{2} (36.2/sq mi)
  - Urban: 10,898
  - Rural: 8,254
- Time zone: UTC+3 (MSK)

Staryya Darohi district or Staryja Darohi district (Belarusian: Старадарожскі раён; Russian: Стародорожский район) is a district (raion) of Minsk region in Belarus. Its administrative center is Staryya Darohi. As of 2024, it has a population of 19,152.

== Administrative divisions ==
=== Rural councils ===
There are seven selsoviets in the Staryya Darohi District:

- Drazhnovsky
- Novodorozhsky
- Pasek
- Polozewiczski
- Starodorozhsky
- Shchitkovichi
- Yazylsky

The Gorki selsoviet was abolished in 2013.
