= Marszałek =

Polish title

Coat of Arms of the Silesian Piasts and Coat of Arms of the Marszałek family through heraldic adoption.

Marszałek (English: Marshal, Lithuanian: Maršalka, Belarusian: Маршалак, Latin: Marescallus) was the title of one of the highest officials in the Polish royal court since the 13th century, and in the Grand Duchy of Lithuania since the 15th century. It was the highest-ranking of all court officials and was considered the most important advisor to the King of Poland.

== History ==
The term marszałek, derived from Old German marh-skalk or horse-servant came to Polish language in the 13th century from Bohemia. Initially it retained its original meaning, but then evolved to denote the primary military leader in various courts of princes, most notably in Silesia. Later the title evolved further to denote one of the functions at the court. In the 14th century the royal court in Kraków introduced an office of the Marshal of the Polish Kingdom (marszałek Królestwa Polskiego), which was reserved for kings' advisors.

=== Historical usage, 1240–1772 ===
The first recorded mention of a Marszałek is at the Battle of Legnica in Silesia on April 9, 1241, where the forces of Henry II the Pious were soundly defeated by the Mongols.

In 1486, Albin Szlachcic Marszałek, Kapitan Rycerstwa (German: Ritter und Edler von Marszałek, Hauptmann der Ritterschaft), was further ennobled by Prince Jan II (Jan II the Mad), one of the last Silesian Piasts, as the result of successful campaigns against Brandenburg that reached as far as Berlin. Albin Szlachcic Marszałek was a member of the Szlachta (Polish noble estate) Thomas Paul Michael Marshall, Ritter und Edler von Marszalek and his sons Knox William Marshall, Ritter und Edler von Marszalek and Andrew Thomas Marshall, Ritter und Edler von Marszalek are Albin's nearest living relatives.

It is believed Albin Szlachcic Marszałek (Eng: Lord Marshal) assumed the coat of arms of Prince Jan II based on heraldic adoption. Heraldic adoption (Polish: adopcja herbowa), was, in the Kingdom of Poland, a common form of adoption into an existing heraldic clan along with assuming the coat of arms of that clan. The adoption of heraldic arms was a procedure used solely in Polish heraldry and was one of the earlier "old way" forms of ennoblement in Poland. It became particularly popular in the 15th century but was abolished by the first half of the 17th century.

In the 15th century a similar office of Grand Marshal of the Crown (marszałek wielki koronny) was created for the closest of all kings' men. The Grand Marshal was often referred to as the first of the servants or first of the advisors (pierwszy minister in 16th century Polish) as he was superior to all other officials at the court, including the cup-bearers, sword-bearers, flag-bearers, writers, mathematicians and secretaries. Among his responsibilities were command over the court during kings' travels, obedience of court etiquette and starting and closing the Senate meetings. In addition, when away from the Royal Castle, King entitled the marszałek to enforce the so-called marshal articles, or a set of rules limiting the freedom of the szlachta in the presence of the monarch and regulating the order of meetings in order to ensure kings' safety. Initially traditional law, the set of rules was finally accepted by the Sejm in 1678.

The Grand marshal's deputy was named marszałek nadworny (marshal of the court), who was taking care for the court and the safety of the dames. After the Union of Lublin similar offices were created for Lithuania and were entitled to conduct the same set of duties when the king was on the Lithuanian soil. In addition, a separate office of land marshal of Lithuania (marszałek ziemski litewski) was created. Finally, in the 17th century an office of marszałek dworski (court marshal, not to be confused with marshal of the court) was created. The latter official was the manager of kings' private property.

In addition to the court officials, the term marszałek was also used to denote a number of lower-ranking or temporary officials. Out of those the most prominent were marshals of the Sejm (Polish parliament) (marszałek sejmu) and Sejmiks (regional parliaments).

=== Usage since 1772 ===
Before the partition of Poland, the highest military rank equivalent to modern marszałek (Field marshal) was hetman.

In 1772, after the First Partition of Poland, in the Russian-occupied part of the Polish–Lithuanian Commonwealth an office of the marszałek szlachty (Marshal of Nobility) was created. Not related to the earlier court officials, the szlachta marshal was a deputy of Russian-nominated governor and was entitled with taking care of the sejmiks and other self-government bodies of the gentry, as well as with collecting taxes and controlling the genealogical records. The Collection of Laws of the Russian Empire of 1842 introduced two sets of such officials: one for gubernyal level of administration and the other for powiat-level. Initially elected by the gentry, after the January Uprising of 1863 the marshals were usually nominated by the governor. Their influence soon diminished and the office was abolished, together with the traditional Polish system of administrative division onto voivodships, lands and powiats.

In the 20th century, when Poland regained independence, a new rank was created: marszałek polski (Marshal of Poland). It was first given to Józef Piłsudski, and although it is the highest military rank it is more of an honor-rank. This title is granted only to military commanders who achieved victory during a war. Marszałek sejmu was recreated as well.

== Types ==
Following is a list of titles of marszałek. In many cases, they are completely unrelated to each other.

In the Polish Kingdom:

- Marszałek Krolestwa Polskiego – Marshal of the Kingdom of Poland

In the semi-confederal Polish-Lithnuanian Commonwealth, offices were split:

- In the Polish Crown:
  - Marszałek wielki koronny – Grand Marshal of the Crown
  - Marszałek nadworny koronny – Marshal of the Court of the Crown
- In the Grand Duchy of Lithuania:
  - Marszałek wielki litewski – Grand Marshal of Lithuania
  - Marszałek nadworny litewski – Marshal of the Court of Lithuania
- Common:
  - Marszałek dworski – Court Marshal
  - Marszałek ziemski – District Marshal or Land Marshal
  - Marszałek sejmu – Marshal of the Sejm
  - Marszałek sejmiku – Marshal of the Sejmik

In partitioned Poland:

- Marszałek szlachty – Marshal of the Szlachta

In the Second Polish Republic, the People's Republic of Poland, and present-day Poland:

- Marszałek Polski – Marshal of Poland (military rank)
- Marszałek sejmu – Speaker of the Sejm
- Marszałek senatu – Speaker of the Senate of Poland

Since 1999:

- Marszałek województwa (voivodeship marshal) – leader of the indirectly elected executive of a voivodeship (one of Poland's 16 provinces) by sejmik (voivodeship's legislature), co-existing with the government-appointed voivode (governor)

== See also ==
- Hetman
- Marshal of the Sejm
- Offices in Polish–Lithuanian Commonwealth
