= Castellans of the Polish–Lithuanian Commonwealth =

Castellans of the Polish–Lithuanian Commonwealth formed the lower tier of territorial officials entitled to sit in the Senate of Poland. They generally ranked beneath voivodes in the hierarchy of provincial authority, with the exception of the distinguished castellans of Kraków, Vilnius, and Trakai, who held precedence over voivodes. The number of castellans varied over time in accordance with changes to the Commonwealth’s territorial organisation.

== Competences ==
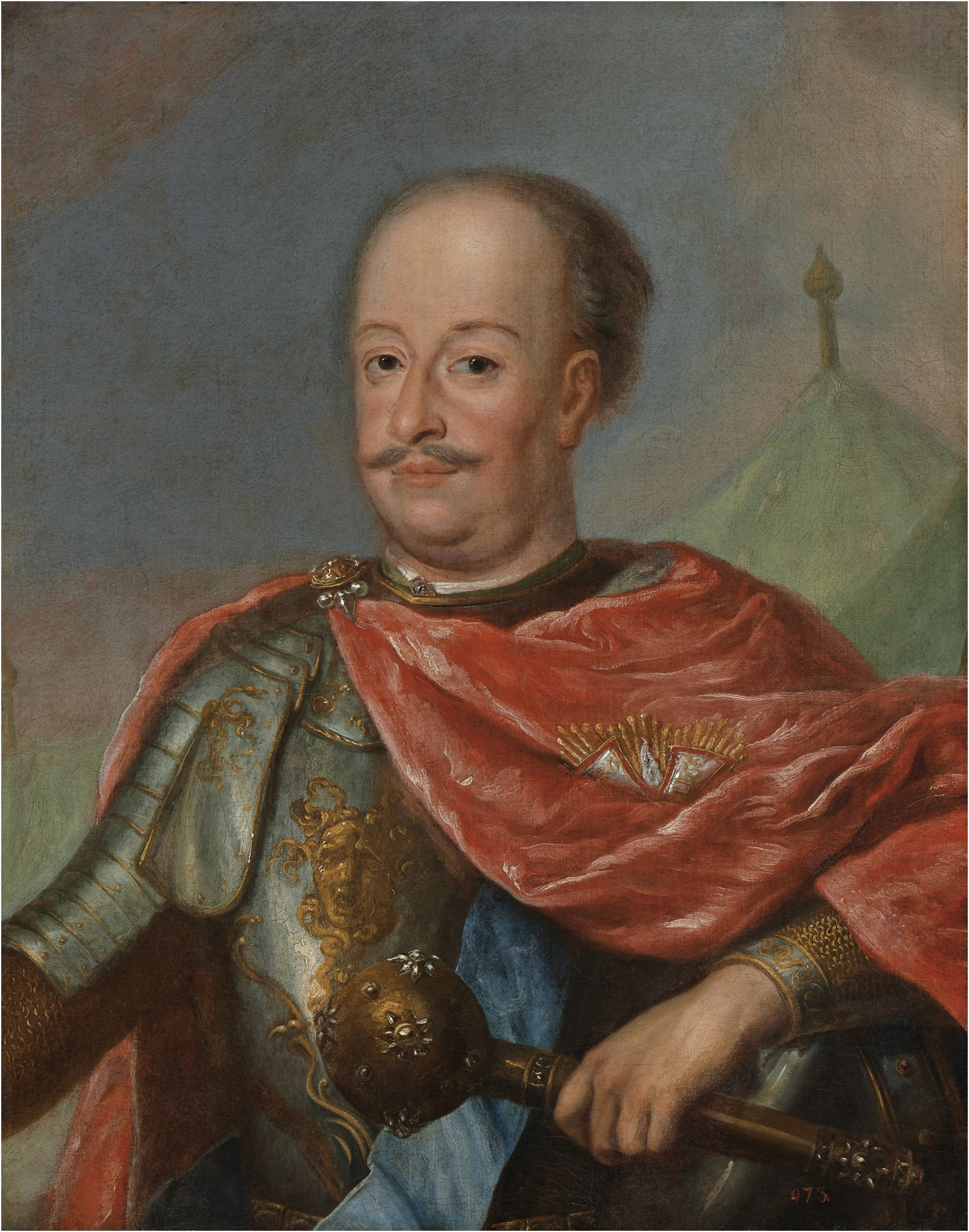
Adam Mikołaj Sieniawski, castellan of Kraków (1710). Portrait by an unknown artist, 18th century

With the exception of the Castellan of Kraków, who held the highest rank among castellans and traditionally outranked voivodes, castellans were generally considered subordinate to voivodes. Two castellans in the Grand Duchy of Lithuania — those of Vilnius and Trakai — also enjoyed privileged status and ranked above voivodes. Castellans originally governed territorial units known as castellanies (kasztelania), but these declined as administrative divisions in the late 15th century, when the Commonwealth's territorial organisation shifted toward provinces and powiats.

From the mid‑1560s, the principle of incompatibilitas ("incompatibility") precluded voivodes and castellans from holding a second ministerial office, with the exception of the post of hetman.

== List ==
The list below is based on data from 1569. The number of castellans changed in later centuries.

- Distinguished Castellans Kasztelanowie Wyróżnieni — of Kraków, Vilnius and Trakai were seated alongside the Voivodes:
1. Castellan of Kraków (kasztelan krakowski). Seat: Kraków. Seated in the Senate, above the Voivode of Kraków.
2. Castellan of Vilnius (kasztelan wileński). Seat: Vilnius. Seated 6th in the Senate after the Voivode of Sandomierz and before the Voivode of Kalisz.
3. Castellan of Trakai (kasztelan trocki). Seat: Trakai. Seated 10th in the Senate after the Voivode of Sieradz and before the Voivode of Łęczyca
- Kasztelanowie Więksi (Krzesłowi) — 31 Major Castellans:
1. Greater Castellan of Poznań, Seat: Poznań
2. Greater Castellan of Sandomierz, Seat: Sandomierz
3. Greater Castellan of Kalisz, Seat: Kalisz
4. Greater Castellan of Wojnicz, Seat: Wojnicz
5. Greater Castellan of Gniezno, Seat: Gniezno
6. Greater Castellan of Sieradz, Seat: Sieradz
7. Greater Castellan of Łęczyca, Seat: Łęczyca
8. Greater Castellan of Samogitia, Seat: Samogitia
9. Greater Castellan of Brześć Kujawski, Seat: Brześć Kujawski
10. Greater Castellan of Kijów, Seat: Kijów (Kyiv)
11. Greater Castellan of Inowrocław, Seat: Inowrocław
12. Greater Castellan of Lwów, Seat: Lwów (Lviv)
13. Greater Castellan of Wołyń, Seat: Wołyń (Volhynia)
14. Greater Castellan of Kamieniec, Seat: Kamieniec Podolski (Kamianets-Podilskyi)
15. Greater Castellan of Smoleńsk, Seat: Smoleńsk (Smolensk)
16. Greater Castellan of Lublin, Seat: Lublin
17. Greater Castellan of Połock, Seat: Połock (Polotsk)
18. Greater Castellan of Bełsk, Seat: Bełsk (Belz)
19. Greater Castellan of Nowogródek, Seat: Nowogródek (Novogrudok)
20. Greater Castellan of Płock, Seat: Płock
21. Greater Castellan of Witebsk, Seat: Witebsk (Vitebsk)
22. Greater Castellan of Czersk, Seat: Czersk
23. Greater Castellan of Podlasie, Seat: Podlasie
24. Greater Castellan of Rawa, Seat: Rawa Mazowiecka
25. Greater Castellan of Brześć Litewski, Seat: Brześć Litewski (Brest)
26. Greater Castellan of Chełmno, Seat: Chełmno
27. Greater Castellan of Mścisław, Seat: Mścisław (Mstsislaw)
28. Greater Castellan of Elbląg, Seat: Elbląg
29. Greater Castellan of Bracław, Seat: Bracław (Bratslav)
30. Greater Castellan of Gdańsk, Seat: Gdańsk (Danzig)
31. Greater Castellan of Mińsk, Seat: Mińsk
32. Greater Castellan of Wenden, Seat: Wenden (Cēsis, added after 1569)
33. Greater Castellan of Dorpat, Seat: Dorpat (Tartu, added after 1569)
34. Greater Castellan of Parnawa, Seat: Parnawa (Pärnu, added after 1569)
35. Greater Castellan of Inflanty, Seat: Livonia (replaced those of Wenden, Dorpat and Parnawa in 1677)
36. Greater Castellan of Czernihów, Seat: Czernihów
- Kasztelanowie Mniejsi (Drążkowi) — 49 Minor Castellans:
1. Minor Castellan of Nowy Sącz, Seat: Nowy Sącz
2. Minor Castellan of Międzyrzecze, Seat: Miedzyrzecze, Silesian Voivodeship
3. Minor Castellan of Wiślica, Seat: Wiślica
4. Minor Castellan of Biecz, Seat: Biecz
5. Minor Castellan of Rogoźno, Seat: Rogoźno
6. Minor Castellan of Radom, Seat: Radom
7. Minor Castellan of Zawichost, Seat: Zawichost
8. Minor Castellan of Ląd, Seat: Ląd
9. Minor Castellan of Śrem, Seat: Śrem
10. Minor Castellan of Żary, Seat: Żary
11. Minor Castellan of Małogoszcz, Seat: Małogoszcz
12. Minor Castellan of Wieluń, Seat: Wieluń
13. Minor Castellan of Przemyśl, Seat: Przemyśl
14. Minor Castellan of Halicz, Seat: Halicz (Halych)
15. Minor Castellan of Sanok, Seat: Sanok
16. Minor Castellan of Chełm, Seat: Chełm
17. Minor Castellan of Dobrzyń, Seat: Dobrzyń
18. Minor Castellan of Połaniec, Seat: Połaniec
19. Minor Castellan of Przemęt, Seat: Przemęt
20. Minor Castellan of Krzywina, Seat: Krzywina
21. Minor Castellan of Czchów, Seat: Czchów
22. Minor Castellan of Nakło, Seat: Nakło
23. Minor Castellan of Rozprza, Seat: Rozprza
24. Minor Castellan of Biechów, Seat: Biechów
25. Minor Castellan of Bydgoszcz, Seat: Bydgoszcz
26. Minor Castellan of Brzeziny, Seat: Brzeziny
27. Minor Castellan of Kruszwica, Seat: Kruszwica
28. Minor Castellan of Oświęcim, Seat: Oświęcim
29. Minor Castellan of Kamieńsk, Seat: Kamieńsk
30. Minor Castellan of Spycimierz, Seat: Spycimierz
31. Minor Castellan of Inowłódz, Seat: Inowłódz
32. Minor Castellan of Kowale, Seat: Kowal
33. Minor Castellan of Santok, Seat: Santok
34. Minor Castellan of Sochaczew, Seat: Sochaczew
35. Minor Castellan of Warsaw, Seat: Warsaw
36. Minor Castellan of Gostyniec, Seat: Gostyniec or Goślice
37. Minor Castellan of Wizna, Seat: Wizna
38. Minor Castellan of Raciąż, Seat: Raciąż
39. Minor Castellan of Sierpc, Seat: Sierpc
40. Minor Castellan of Wyszogród, Seat: Wyszogród
41. Minor Castellan of Rypin. Seat: Rypin
42. Minor Castellan of Zakroczym, Seat: Zakroczym
43. Minor Castellan of Ciechanowice, Seat: Ciechanowice
44. Minor Castellan of Liw, Seat: Liw
45. Minor Castellan of Słońsk, Seat: Słońsk (present Ciechocinek)
46. Minor Castellan of Lubaczów, Seat: Lubaczów
- Kasztelanowie Konarscy (Koniuszy) — 3 Equerry Castellans:
1. Minor Konary Castellan of Sieradz, Seat: Sieradz
2. Minor Konary Castellan of Łęczyca, Seat: Łęczyca
3. Minor Konary Castellan of Inowrocław, Seat: Inowrocław
