= An Epitaph for Barbara Radziwill =

1983 film by Janusz Majewski

- Directed by: Janusz Majewski
- Starring: Jerzy Zelnik; Anna Dymna
- Release date: 1983
- Running time: 89 minutes
- Country: Poland
- Language: Polish

An Epitaph for Barbara Radziwiłł (Polish: Epitafium dla Barbary Radziwiłłówny) is a Polish historical film. It was released in 1983. Directed by Janusz Majewski. It tells a story about King Sigismund Augustus's marriage to Barbara Radziwiłł, and immiediate aftermath of her death.

== Cast ==
- Jerzy Zelnik as Sigismund II Augustus, King of Poland and Grand Duke of Lithuania, Elizabeth's and Barbara's widower
- Anna Dymna as Barbara Radziwiłł, Sigismund Augustus's second wife/Unnamed peasant woman (Queen Barbara's look-alike)
- Aleksandra Śląska as Bona Sforza, second wife of King Sigismund I the Old and mother of Sigismund Augustus
- Bożena Adamek as Elizabeth of Austria, Sigismund Augustus's first wife
- Krzysztof Kolberger as "Anonymous", court poet
- Zdzisław Kozień as Sigismund I the Old, Sigismund Augustus's father
- Bogusław Sochnacki as Mikołaj Radziwiłł the Red, Barbara's brother
- Jerzy Trela as Mikołaj Radziwiłł the Black, Barbara's first cousin
- Jan Machulski as Wolski, Sigismund Augustus's chief stewart

== Plot ==
Year 1551, Kraków. After the death of his wife (Queen Barbara Radziwiłł), King Sigismund Augustus conducts a funeral procession to Wilno, where he intends to bury her. During journey the King is accompanied by court poet who keeps his identity hidden and appears to harbour romantic feelings to the late Queen himself. Sigismund asks him to write an epitaph about Barbara's death, however the artist is unable to do so.

Through series of flashbacks, the royal couple's story is told:

Young Sigismund Augustus is co-ruler with his father Sigismund I. Augustus marries Elizabeth of Austria, but the new queen turns out to be gravely ill from epilepsy and unable to bear a child. The young king distances himself from wife and with the advice of his mother, Queen Bona Sforza, he leaves Poland to govern over Grand Duchy of Lithuania. In Gieranony he meets a young widow Barbara Radziwiłł, and the two soon start an affair, that continues even after Elizabeth joins her husband a Wilno. Soon Elizabeth dies.

On his birthday Sigismund Augustus visits Barbara and is persuaded to marry her by her relatives in order to keep proper name of Radziwiłł family. When King Sigismund I dies, Augustus announces his new marriage to the court and his mother. Bona chastises him for marrying in secret his long-time lover and opposes idea of crowning Barbara. Augustus proposes he can remain with his wife without coronation, but his mother points out that only a child born to the crowned queen will be recognized as heir to the throne.

Barbara becomes pregnant twice but suffers miscarriages. During sejm in Piotrków many Polish nobles speak against King's mésalliance and demand from Sigismund to annul his marriage. He rejects their request and threatens to abdicate if they won't accept his Queen.

Barbara is ultimately crowned, but her health soon deteriorates. She reminiscences of her childhood in Lithuania and the happy times she spent with Augustus in Wilno. On her deathbed, the Queen asks her husband to be buried there, not in Poland.

In the present, her funeral procession reaches Wilno. Before entering the town Sigismund sees vision of his wife and her childhood-self reunited and at peace.
