= Kolanka =

Kolanka may refer to:

- Koła, feminine form Kolanka, Polish noble family
- Barbara Kolanka (end of the 15th century–1550), Polish noblewoman
- Kolanka Venkata Raju, mridangam player
- Kolanka Cup, polo trophy awarded in the India
