= Barbara Radziwiłł =

Queen of Poland and Grand Duchess of Lithuania from 1548 to 1551

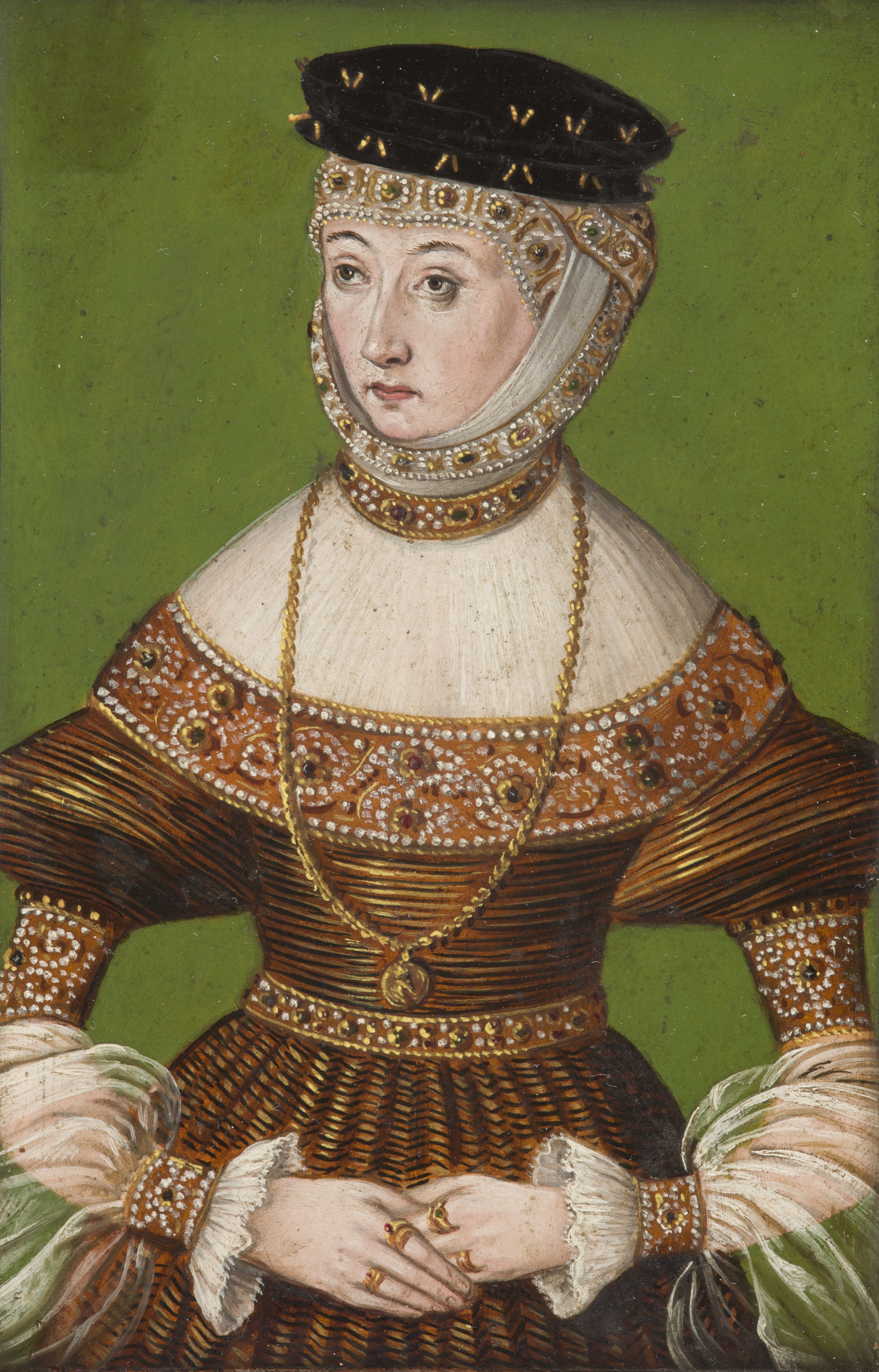
- Portrait by Lucas Cranach the Younger, c. 1551

Queen consort of Poland Grand Duchess consort of Lithuania
- Tenure: 17 April 1548 – 8 May 1551
- Coronation: 7 December 1550
- Born: 6 December, 1520/1523; Vilnius or Dubingiai, Grand Duchy of Lithuania
- Died: 8 May 1551 (aged 27–30); Kraków, Kingdom of Poland
- Burial: 23 June 1551; Vilnius Cathedral
- Spouse: Stanislovas Goštautas (m. 1537; died 1542) Sigismund II Augustus (m. 1547)
- House: Radziwiłł family
- Father: Jerzy Radziwiłł
- Mother: Barbara Kolanka
- Religion: Roman Catholicism

Barbara Radziwiłł (Polish: Barbara Radziwiłłówna, Lithuanian: Barbora Radvilaitė; 6 December 1520/1523 – 8 May 1551) was Queen of Poland and Grand Duchess of Lithuania as the second wife of Sigismund II Augustus, the last male monarch of the Jagiellon dynasty. Barbara, already widowed and considered a great beauty, became a royal mistress most likely in 1543 and married Sigismund in secret in July or August 1547. The marriage caused a scandal and was vehemently opposed by Polish nobles, including the queen mother, Bona Sforza.

Sigismund Augustus, with the support of Barbara's cousin Mikołaj Radziwiłł the Black and her brother Mikołaj Radziwiłł the Red, worked tirelessly to gain recognition for their marriage and to crown Barbara as Queen of Poland. Their efforts succeeded, and her coronation was held on 7 December 1550 at Wawel Cathedral. However, her health was already deteriorating, and she died just five months later. Despite the brevity of her reign, Barbara's marriage propelled the Radziwiłł family to new heights of political power and influence.

Contemporaries of the time generally viewed Barbara in a negative light, accusing her of promiscuity and witchcraft. Her life became surrounded by rumors and legends, and she emerged as a heroine in many literary works. From the 18th century onward, Barbara's life was romanticized as a great tragic love story, often portraying Bona Sforza as the chief antagonist. This narrative captured the public imagination and inspired numerous poems, plays, films, and other works, making Barbara Radziwiłł one of the best-known and most recognized women in the history of the Grand Duchy of Lithuania and the Kingdom of Poland.

== Early life ==
Barbara was the youngest child of Jerzy Radziwiłł, Voivode of Trakai and Vilnius and Great Lithuanian Hetman, and his wife Barbara Kolanka, daughter of Voivode of Podolia. She was also a descendant of Queen Elizabeth of Pilica, wife of the first Jagiellonian King of Poland, Władysław Jagiełło (the great-grandfather of Barbara's second husband, Sigismund II Augustus).

Barbara was born 6 December of unknown year between 1520 and 1523. Some historians favour 1520 based on Radziwiłł family's genealogy found in Nesvizh. However, the plaque found inside her coffin says she died having "not completed 28th year of life", which would place her birth in 1523; it is supported by the epitaph written by Piotr Roizjusz and the epitaph in Vilnius Cathedral, as well as inscription on the coffin, which all claims the Queen died "in her third decade" of life, therefore before turning 30. Additionally, Salomon Rysiński who was a courtier of Radziwiłł family at the end of 16th century, recorded 1522 as the year of Barbara's birth. Therefore, according to historian Agnieszka Januszek-Sieradzka, "the preserved sources seem to leave no room for doubt" that Barbara was born after 1520.

Details of her education are unknown, but it is unlikely that it was extensive. From her correspondence it is known Barbara spoke and wrote in Polish; she also knew Ruthenian, but apparently never wrote in it herself. From a February 1549 letter, it could be inferred that she understood at least some Latin, but her letters to Sigismund Augustus had not a single Latin phrase. She was raised and grew up to be a Catholic.

According to her contemporaries, Barbara was very beautiful. Moreover, she had an interest in fashion and cosmetics, and used perfumes and face powder.

As Vilnius royal castle and Radziwiłł family's Vilnius palace were placed next to each other, Barbara most likely met her future husband, Sigismund II Augustus, when they were both children, although they did not enter into relationship until mid 1540s.

== Marriage to Stanislovas Goštautas ==
In 1536, Stanislovas Goštautas, Voivode of Nowogrodek, canceled his betrothal to Anna Elżbieta Radziwiłł, elder sister of Barbara. Jerzy Radziwiłł then offered the hand of Barbara even though it was against custom for a younger sister to wed first. The wedding treaty was signed on 20 October 1536 in Radun. Another plan to wed either Anna Elżbieta or Barbara to Ilia Ostrogski, the only son of Great Hetman Konstanty Ostrogski, fell through. The wedding of Barbara and Stanislovas Goštautas took place on 18 May 1537 in Goštautas' residence in Hieraniony. Her dowry included numerous silver and gilded tableware items, 24 fine horses, dresses of satin and damask decorated with gold and precious stones. In exchange, Stanislovas transferred property worth 8,000 kopas of Lithuanian groschens to Barbara. Their marriage was childless. Stanislovas died unexpectedly after a brief illness on 18 December 1542.

== Marriage to Sigismund Augustus ==
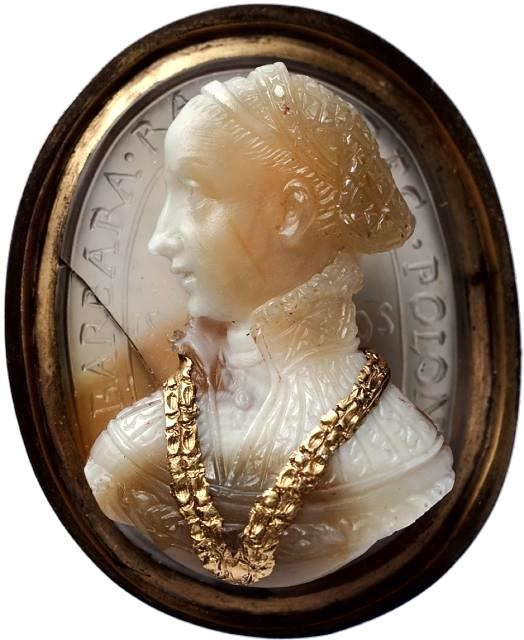
Cameo showing Queen Barbara from profile, made in 1550 by Jacopo Caraglio

=== Love affair and secret marriage ===
Stanislovas Goštautas was the last male member of the Goštautai family and, according to law regarding childless widows, the majority of his possessions were inherited by Sigismund I the Old, Grand Duke of Lithuania. On 15 June 1543, Sigismund transferred the property to his son Sigismund II Augustus who visited Hieraniony in October 1543 to take over the estate. It is likely that it was when Barbara and Sigismund Augustus became lovers, though there is no evidence of the affair until after the death of Sigismund Augustus' first wife.

In July 1544, Sigismund Augustus traveled to Brest and returned with his wife Elizabeth of Austria in October to Vilnius, where Barbara resided with her mother. On 15 June 1545, Elizabeth died from epileptic seizures. Sigismund Augustus and Barbara were free to enjoy each other's company – rumors spread about their romantic rendezvous, hunts, and parties. Sigismund Augustus spent 223 days in 1546 hunting. It was said that Sigismund Augustus ordered construction of a secret tunnel connecting the Royal Palace with the nearby Radziwiłł Palace so that the couple could meet frequently and discreetly. At the same time, Sigismund Augustus and his parents searched for a new bride. Sigismund I the Old contemplated a marriage to Anna Sophia, daughter of Albert, Duke of Prussia. Other candidates included Anna d'Este of Duchy of Ferrara, widowed Anna of Lorraine, Princesses Mary I of England and Margaret of France.

Sometime in 1547, Sigismund Augustus and Barbara wed in secret. Neither exact date nor circumstances are known. The Lithuanian Chronicles recorded the doubtful claim that Sigismund Augustus was forced into the marriage when he was caught with Barbara by the Radziwiłł cousins; it is widely dismissed by historians. The King himself in the letter to his cousin Albrecht Hohenzollern as the reason of marriage with Barbara cited love.

According to research by Władysław Pociecha, the wedding probably took place between 26 July and 6 August. Her cousin Mikołaj "the Black" Radziwiłł was sent to Kraków to inform the Polish court that Sigismund Augustus and Barbara were married since 25 November 1545. It seems he failed the assignment and Sigismund Augustus had to travel to Poland himself. He departed Vilnius on 15 November; Barbara was sent to the Radziwiłł estate in Dubingiai. In a letter dated 20 November, courtier Stanisław Dowojno, starosta of Merkinė, informed Sigismund Augustus that due to the difficult journey Barbara had a miscarriage. If that indeed was true, and not an elaborate intrigue by the Radziwiłłs, it would explain the secret marriage – an attempt to provide legitimacy to the child. However, it seems more likely that Barbara became pregnant after the wedding, as the loss of a child appear to have happened early in the potential pregnancy. Another explanation could be that the bleeding was caused by a rupture of an internal abscess, an early sign of her terminal illness.

=== Queen and Grand Duchess ===
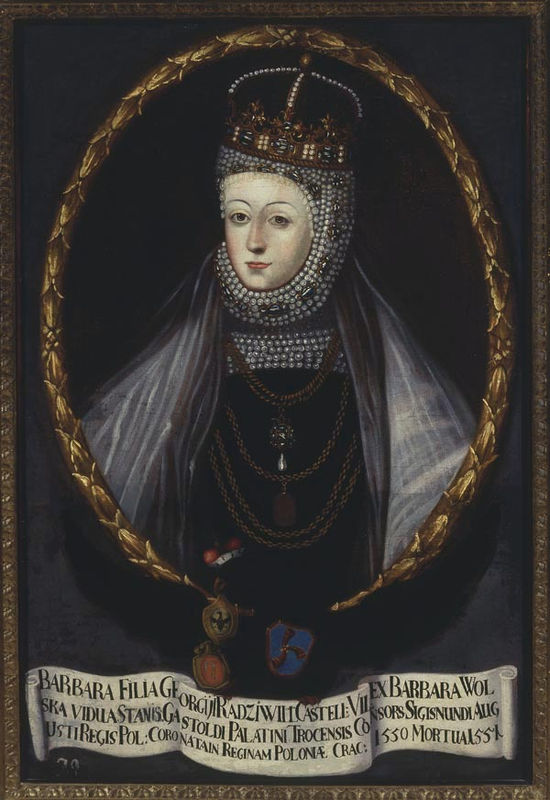
Barbara Radziwiłł in coronation robes and pearls that became her signature jewelry. 18th-century copy of an original 16th-century portrait.

==== Political struggle for recognition ====
Sigismund Augustus informed his parents of the marriage on 2 February 1548 in Piotrków Trybunalski. The news caused an uproar among Polish nobles as Sigismund Augustus wed without the approval of the Senate. What was worse, Barbara was his subject and lover. Queen mother Bona Sforza was one of the most vocal opponents. In the ensuing campaign against recognizing the marriage, Barbara was widely accused of promiscuous behavior and of using witchcraft or poison to seduce Sigismund Augustus. Various authors, including Stanisław Orzechowski and Mikołaj Rej, published and distributed various derogatory pamphlets. The charge of promiscuity often enters works of modern historians though it is not based on any actual evidence. Lithuanian nobles did not openly protest the marriage, but were distrustful of the Radziwiłłs and their rise to power.

King Sigismund I the Old died on 1 April 1548. Sigismund Augustus, who briefly returned to Vilnius, had to travel back to Kraków to attend the funeral and secure himself on the Polish throne. Before he left, the King publicly announced his marriage and proclaimed his wife the Queen of Poland on 17 April 1548. By this act she also was legalized as the Grand Duchess of Lithuania.

During her husband's absence, Barbara stayed in Vilnius, in the royal castle. In May she informed him by letter that she is pregnant again; she either was mistaken or pregnancy ended in miscarriage, as the Queen briefly fell ill around this time. Since this is known only from Radziwiłł reports, it has also been proposed that the baby was another intrigue to influence the King. In September 1548, Sigismund Augustus invited Barbara to Poland to show the strength of their marriage. The issue was discussed by the general sejm on 31 October – 12 December in Piotrków Trybunalski. The sessions were loud and rowdy. The nobles, including voivodes Piotr Kmita Sobieński, Jan Gabriel Tęczyński, and Piotr Boratyński, pleaded the King to abandon the marriage and even threatened to take up arms. Sigismund Augustus steadfastly refused and stood by his wife; reportedly he even considered abdication. The sejm ended in a stalemate.

After the sejm, Sigismund and Barbara entered Kraków on 13 February 1549. In Wawel, Barbara enjoyed a luxurious lifestyle and expensive gifts. In May 1549, she received large territories in the Trakai Voivodeship, including Kaunas Castle, Rumšiškės, Alytus, Merkinė, Nemunaitis, Birštonas, Žiežmariai, Stakliškės, Karmėlava, Vilkija, Skirsnemunė, Veliuona, Darsūniškis. While she had immense influence on Sigismund Augustus, she showed no interest in politics unlike her ambitious cousin Mikołaj "the Black" Radziwiłł and brother Mikołaj "the Red" Radziwiłł. While they worked with her husband to secure her the Polish crown, she made no gestures to win support from the nobles or favor from the people. When a compromise solution was offered – recognize Barbara as Sigismund Augustus' wife but not to crown her as Queen of Poland – Sigismund Augustus refused because that would cast a doubt on legitimacy of any future children. In summer 1549, to protect himself from a possible armed rebellion, Sigismund Augustus concluded an alliance with Ferdinand, King of Hungary, leaving his sister Isabella Jagiellon to fend for herself in the succession disputes in the Kingdom of Hungary. He also worked to threaten, bribe, or otherwise persuade Polish nobles not to oppose the marriage. His mother and one of the most vocal opponents, dowager Queen Bona Sforza, left the court and moved to Mazovia.

==== Coronation ====
During next sejm in May–July 1550, Polish nobility was not questioning anymore the validity of the royal marriage and Barbara was recognized as the King's legitimate wife. Therefore, while neither the sejm nor the senate gave an explicit permission, she was crowned as Queen of Poland on 7 December 1550 in Wawel Cathedral by Primate Mikołaj Dzierzgowski.

Dzierzgowski was an ally of Bona and was reluctant to recognize the new Queen. Sigismund managed to obtain recognition of his marriage by the Vatican, and Pope Julius III in late 1550 called the Polish bishops to crown Barbara. However, his order proved to be unnecessary, as the King had been able to make Dzierzgowski agree to crown his wife, before the envoy from Rome arrived to Poland. It was once thought that an edict prohibiting heresy, that would target Protestants, issued by Sigsmund, was primarily created to endear the Primate's favour for the royal pair. However, though winning over Dzierzgowski to Barbara's cause might have played some part, it appears the new law was mainly a result of civil disorder caused by some Protestant nobles.

==== Illness and death ====
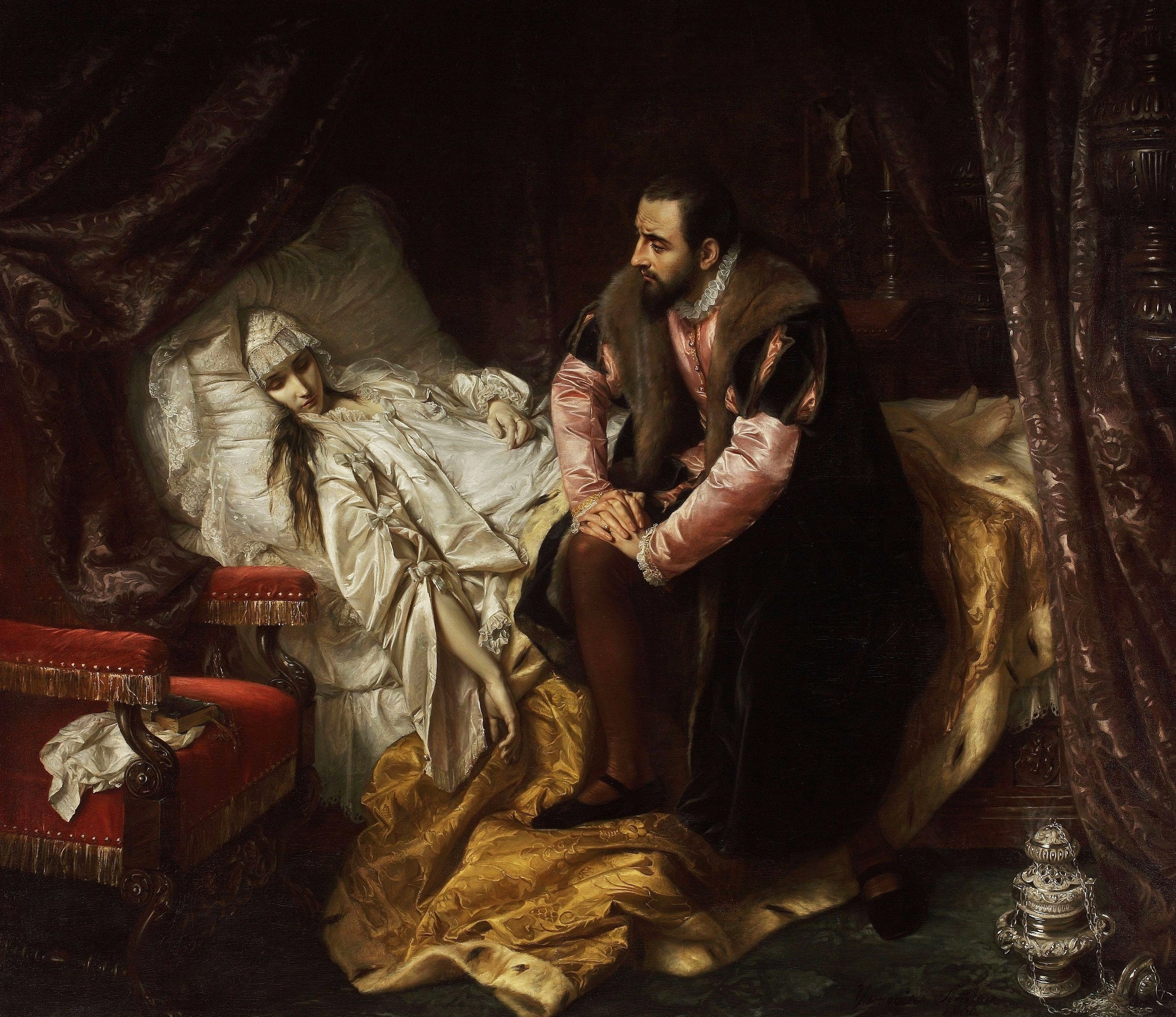
Death of Barbara Radziwiłł by Józef Simmler

Almost since her wedding in 1547, Barbara complained of poor health, particularly of abdominal pain or "internal stones". After the coronation her health took a turn for worse. She had fever, abdominal pain, lost appetite. A lump appeared on her stomach full of pus. Sigismund Augustus asked to send women healers, including a Jewish woman, from Lithuania.

In March 1551, her condition improved somewhat and she was able to receive a messenger from Bona Sforza who informed her that Bona recognized her marriage to Sigismund Augustus. It was described as Barbara's last victory. Her health continued to decline and she had fever, diarrhea, nausea. Sigismund Augustus personally tended to his sick wife even though reportedly she stank of pus. He wanted to take her to Niepołomice where he hoped that spring weather would lessen her suffering. When there was a doubt whether a special wagon to transport Barbara could fit through the city gates, Sigismund Augustus ordered the gate demolished. Barbara died on 8 May 1551 in Kraków. She asked to be buried in Vilnius and her body was transported to Vilnius Cathedral, where she was buried on 23 June next to Sigismund Augustus' first wife Elizabeth of Austria. Her death was a severe loss to the King; it is said that for a good portion of the journey he followed her coffin on foot. It was said that Sigismund Augustus became more serious, avoided parties, and liked to dress in black for the rest of his life.

The cause of her illness has been debated by contemporaries and historians. Secretary of Giovanni Francesco Commendone claimed that her illness was caused by her use of medications that were supposed to help to conceive a child. Radziwiłłs in their letters debated whether she had a sexually transmitted disease. There were persistent rumors that she was poisoned by Bona Sforza. Modern historians as the cause of Barbara's death point to cervical cancer or uterine inflammation.

== Physical remains and appearance ==
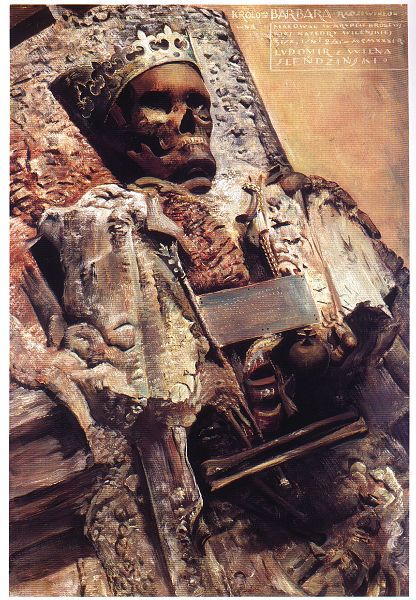
Remains of Barbara (painting by Ludomir Sleńdziński)

Remains of Barbara Radziwiłł in the Royal Crypt of the Vilnius Cathedral, 1931.

Her remains were found in Vilnius Cathedral after a flood in 1931. To preserve her body during the long summer trip from Kraków to Vilnius, it was covered in a mixture of ash and burnt lime. While the wooden coffin rotted away, the lime hardened and formed a protective shell that preserved her bones rather well. She was buried with regal symbols (silver gilded crown, silver scepter, golden orb with a cross) and jewelry (long gold necklace, three gold rings; one of them, gifted to her by Sigismund Augustus, was covered with black vitreous enamel and had three stones – brilliant, ruby, and emerald). These and other artifacts were kept at Vilnius Cathedral, and went missing during World War II. They were rediscovered in the cathedral crypt on 16 December 2024.

Her skeleton was cleaned, conserved, and glued together by Michał Reicher and Witold Sylwanowicz, professors at Stefan Batory University. They calculated her height at 160.2 cm (5 ft 3 in), which was rather tall for her times. Her teeth were white and straight; her body was slim; her face and nose were narrow. They also noted anatomical abnormalities – a cervical (extra) rib and particularly flat sacrum, which could indicate rickets, but the rest of her skeleton showed no signs of the disease. However, they were unable to complete their monograph on the subject due to World War II. Barbara's remains were moved to a crypt under the Chapel of Saint Casimir and remained untouched until 2001. Her height was recalculated at 162 cm (5 ft 4 in). Using methods developed by Mikhail Mikhaylovich Gerasimov, Vytautas Urbanavičius reconstructed her facial features and revealed that she had an aquiline nose. Barbara had light complexion and was most likely a blonde.

== Personal correspondence ==
In total, there are 53 surviving letters from Barbara. 44 of them were published by Alexander Przezdziecki in Jagiellonki polskie x XVI wieku (1868). They are addressed to her family (41 letters to her brother Mikołaj "the Red" Radziwiłł, two letters to her nephews, one letter to her father Jerzy Radziwiłł, one letter to her mother Barbara Kolanka), her husband (8 letters), and Albert, Duke of Prussia (one letter in Latin). It is known that she wrote many more letters to a wider circle of recipients, including Polish nobles and Isabella Jagiellon of Hungary. The surviving letters do not represent actual number or frequency: Sigismund Augustus in his last will asked his sister Anna Jagiellon to destroy his personal correspondence, while Mikołaj "the Red" Radziwiłł was particularly careful to preserve all his correspondence. 52 letters are in Polish (15 of them written by Barbara herself; the rest were written by her secretary Stanisław Koszutski).

Her eight letters to Sigismund Augustus, all written between November 1547 and March 1548 from Dubingiai, are the only surviving love letters of the period. However, they are formulaic and use flowery language. Above all, her letters show her humility and subservience to her husband. Barbara habitually refers to herself as his most humble and smallest servant. She inquires about his health, thanks him for any sign of his good grace and favor, asks him not to forget her. Letters written to others, particularly those by her secretary, are similarly standard though she manages to include more honest and warm greetings and wishes. Initially, Sigismund Augustus lectured her on the proper use of the royal "we" after she sent letters with singular "I". She rarely writes about herself or politics. She often inquired about the recipients' health and wished them good health, trusting God and His good grace. Her correspondence with her brother was controlled by Sigismund Augustus; therefore she wrote several letters to him in secret from her husband.

== In popular culture ==
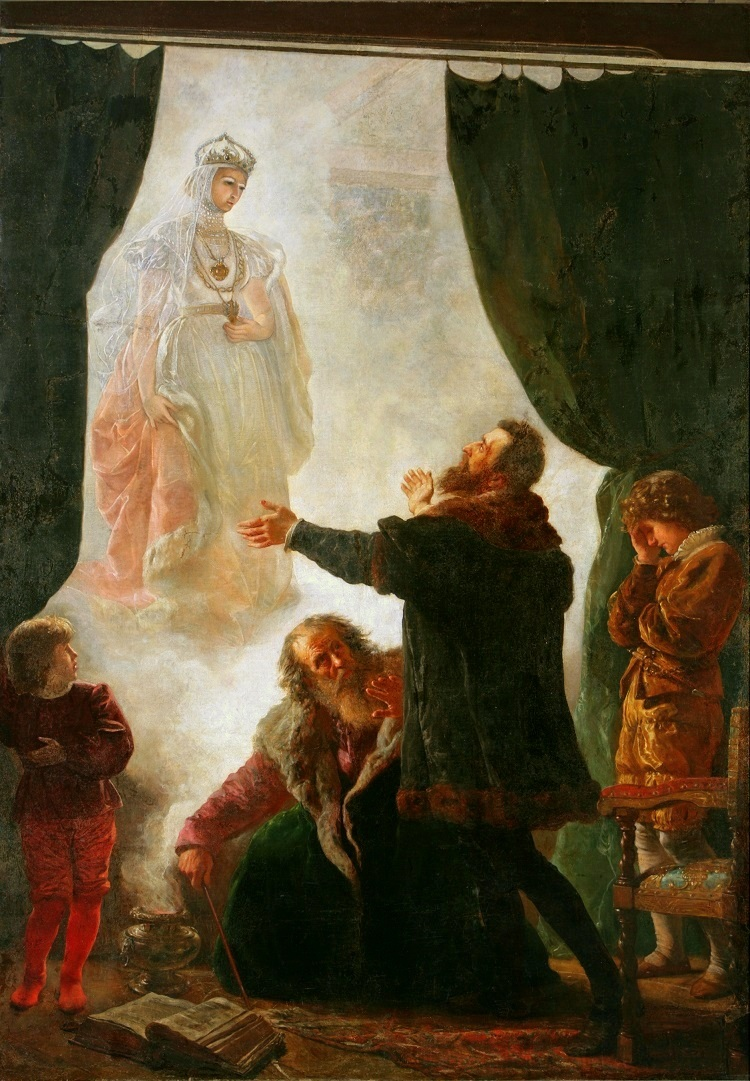
Pan Twardowski summons Barbara's ghost. Painting by Wojciech Gerson.

Barbara's life and death have inspired legends, paintings, literary works and film. The popular legend of Pan Twardowski has that Faust-like figure summoning Barbara's ghost for King Sigismund August. In 1817 Alojzy Feliński wrote a tragedy, and in 1858 Antoni Edward Odyniec a drama, Barbara Radziwiłłówna. A 19th-century lithograph by Michał Kulesza depicting her with pearls is considered among the painter's notable works.

In 1936, director Józef Lejtes directed the film Barbara Radziwiłłówna starring Witold Zacharewicz as the King Sigismund and Jadwiga Smosarska as Barbrara. In 1983 Janusz Majewski directed a film, An Epitaph for Barbara Radziwill (Polish: Epitafium dla Barbary Radziwiłłówny) about Barbara's romance with King Sigismund August, her death and her posthumous return to Vilnius. Anna Dymna starred as Barbara, and Jerzy Zelnik as King Sigismund August. Radziwiłł has also appeared as a major character in The Queen Bona (Polish: Królowa Bona), TV series on Telewizja Polska starring Aleksandra Śląska.

In Lithuania, two plays Barbora Radvilaitė were written, by Balys Sruoga in 1946 (unfinished) and Juozas Grušas in 1972. The latter was staged by the Kaunas State Drama Theater and directed by Jonas Jurašas. It was also turned into a film, directed by Vidmantas Bačiulis, in 1982. In 2012, musical Legend of Žygimantas Augustas and Barbora Radvilaitė (Lithuanian: Žygimanto Augusto ir Barboros Radvilaitės legenda) by Anželika Cholina was described as the biggest and most expensive in Lithuania. It was performed in Chicago in 2018.

The story of Barbara Radziwiłł served as an inspiration for the title track from the 2013 album Czornaja Panna by the Belarusian folkmetal band Litvintroll, a lyrical account of Sigismund's pain and grief after Barbara's death. The band claims the song not only to have given the name to the album but also to have "set its whole outline."

== Ancestors ==
Ancestors of Barbara Radziwiłł

Radvila Astikas
Mikalojus Radvila the Old
Jerzy Radziwiłł
Jonas Manvydas
Sofija Ona Manvydaitė
Anna
Barbara Radziwiłł
Paweł Kola of Dalejów
Barbara Kolanka

== Bibliography ==
- Andriulytė, Algė (2012). "Karališkųjų palaikų atradimas Vilniaus arkikatedroje 1931 m.: atvaizdų kolekcija". Acta Academiae Artium Vilnensis (in Lithuanian). 65–66 (Lietuvos kultūros karališkasis dėmuo: įvaizdžiai, simboliai, reliktai). ISSN 1392-0316.
- Budrys, Romualdas (12 August 2011). "Vilniaus katedros lobynas" (in Lithuanian). Lithuanian Art Museum. Archived from the original on 12 December 2007.
- Cynarski, Stanisław (2007). Žygimantas Augustas (in Lithuanian). Translated by Viktorija Skliutaitė. Versus aureus. ISBN 978-9955-699-59-0.
- Duczmal, Małgorzata (2012). Jogailaičiai (in Lithuanian). Translated by Birutė Mikalonienė; Vyturys Jarutis. Vilnius: Mokslo ir enciklopedijų leidybos centras. ISBN 978-5-420-01703-6.
- Frost, Robert (2015). The Oxford History of Poland-Lithuania. Volume I: The Making of the Polish-Lithuanian Union, 1385-1569. Oxford University Press. ISBN 978-0-19-820869-3.
- Jankauskas, Rimantas (20 March 2013). "LDK istorija: Barboros Radvilaitės kūno rekonstrukcija – antropologinės charakteristikos šaltinis". Orbis Lituaniae. 15min.
- Jonynas, Ignas (1934). "Barbora Radvilaitė". In Biržiška, Vaclovas (ed.). Lietuviškoji enciklopedija (in Lithuanian). Vol. II. Spaudos fondas. OCLC 1012854.
- Kirkor, Adam Honory; Kuchowicz, Zbigniew (1991). Barbora Radvilaitė (in Lithuanian). Translated by Romualdas Petraitis. Mintis. ISBN 9785417005145.
- Klaniczay, Gábor; Pócs, Éva (2008). Witchcraft Mythologies and Persecutions. Central European University Press. ISBN 9789637326875.
- Petrauskas, Rimvydas (2003). Lietuvos diduomenė XIV a. pabaigoje – XV a. (in Lithuanian). Aidai. ISBN 9955-445-67-X.
- Ragauskienė, Raimonda (1999). "Barboros Radvilaitės korespondencija". Barbora Radvilaitė (PDF) (in Lithuanian). Vilnius: Vaga. pp. 96–112. ISBN 978-5-415-01395-1.
- Ragauskienė, Raimonda; Ragauskas, Aivas (2001). Barboros Radvilaitės laiškai Žygimantui Augustui ir kitiems: studija apie XVI a. Lietuvos Didžiosios kunigaikštystės moterų korespondenciją (in Lithuanian). Vaga. ISBN 9785415016136.
- Ragauskienė, Raimonda (27 December 2013). "LDK istorija: Mitai apie Barborą Radvilaitę". Orbis Lituaniae (in Lithuanian). 15min.
- Žalnora, Aistis; Miežutavičiūtė, Vitalija (2011). "Michalas Reicheris ir anatomija Vilniuje 1919–1939" (PDF). Medicinos Teorija Ir Praktika (in Lithuanian). 1 (17). ISSN 1392-1312. Archived from the original (PDF) on 4 October 2018.

Regnal titles
Preceded by Bona Sforza	Queen consort of Poland; 1548–1551	Next: Catherine of Austria
Preceded by Bona Sforza	Grand Duchess consort of Lithuania; 1548–1551	Next: Catherine of Austria
