= Koła =

Polish noble family

Junosza coat of arms of the Koła family

Koła (plural: Kołowie, feminine form: Kolanka) was a Polish noble family, Magnates in the Polish–Lithuanian Commonwealth. The family declined at the beginning of the 17th century. The possessions of the family passed to the other magnates like the Mielecki, Sieniawski, Kmita and Odrowąż families.

The family held important offices in Red Ruthenia and Podolia during the reign of the Jagiellonian dynasty.

== Notable members ==
=== "Koła z Dalejowa" lineage ===
- Jan Koła z Dalejowa (died 1438) – stolnik of Queen Zofia Holszańska, castellan of Halicz
- Paweł Koła z Dalejowa (died 1509) – castellan of Halicz, voivode of Podole
- Jan Koła z Dalejowa (died 1543) – castellan of Halicz, Field Hetman of the Crown in 1529

=== "Koła Saporowski" lineage ===
- Adam Koła Saporowski (died 1599) – founder of the Benedictine monastery in Lwów

== Notable feminine members ==
- Barbara Kolanka Radziwiłłowa – married to Hetman Jerzy Radziwiłł, mother of Queen Barbara Radziwiłłówna, and Hetman Mikołaj Rudy Radziwiłł, mother in law of King Zygmunt II August
- Katarzyna Koła Sieniawska – married to Hetman Mikołaj Sieniawski, mother in law of Spytek Jordan
- Katarzyna Koła Odrowążowa – married to Dobiesław Odrowąż
- Katarzyna Koła Saporowska – founder of the Benedictine monastery in 1595 in Lwów
- Katarzyna Koła Saporowska – married to Mikołaj Herburt and chorąży of Halicz Paweł Skotnicki h. Grzymała

== Coat of arms ==
The family used the Junosza coat of arms.
