= Catherine of Austria, Queen of Poland =

Queen of Poland and Grand Duchess of Lithuania from 1553 to 1572

Catherine of Austria
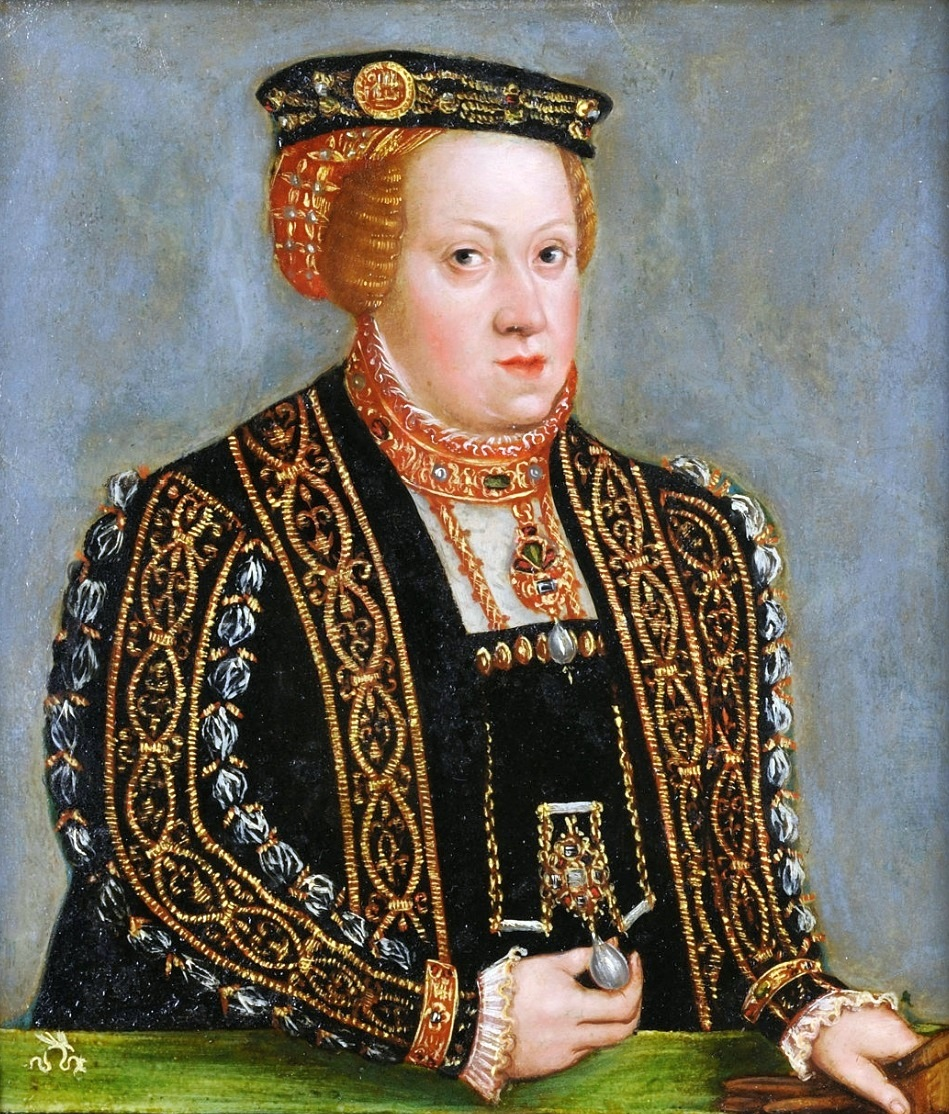
- Portrait by Lucas Cranach the Younger, c. 1553

Queen consort of Poland; Grand Duchess consort of Lithuania
- Tenure: 1553–1572
- Coronation: 30 July 1553 in Wawel Cathedral

Duchess consort of Mantua and Montferrat
- Tenure: 22 October 1549 – 22 February 1550
- Born: 15 September 1533; Innsbruck or Vienna, Holy Roman Empire
- Died: 28 February 1572 (aged 38); Linz, Archduchy of Austria, Holy Roman Empire
- Burial: St. Florian Monastery
- Spouse: Francesco III Gonzaga (m. 1549; died 1550); Sigismund II Augustus (m. 1553)
- House: House of Habsburg
- Father: Ferdinand I, Holy Roman Emperor
- Mother: Anna of Bohemia and Hungary

Catherine of Austria (Polish: Katarzyna Habsburżanka; Lithuanian: Kotryna Habsburgaitė; 15 September 1533 – 28 February 1572) was one of the fifteen children of Ferdinand I, Holy Roman Emperor and Anna of Bohemia and Hungary. In 1553, she married Polish King and Lithuanian Grand Duke Sigismund II Augustus and became Queen consort of Poland and Grand Duchess consort of Lithuania. Catherine suffered miscarriage or false pregnancy in 1554, and – after no children followed – Sigismund became increasingly distant. He tried but failed to obtain an annulment of the marriage from the pope. In 1565, Catherine returned to Austria and lived in Linz until her death. Sigismund died just a few months after her, bringing the male line of the Jagiellon dynasty to its end. The dynasty would continue, strictly speaking, for one more reign—that of Sigismund Augustus’ sister, Anna Jagiellon, who was crowned with the male title of Rex Poloniae.

== Early life and Duchess of Mantua ==
Catherine was one of the fifteen children of Ferdinand I, Holy Roman Emperor, and Anna of Bohemia and Hungary. She spent most of her childhood at Hofburg, Innsbruck and received education based on discipline and religion, learning the Italian and Latin languages. On 17 March 1543, Catherine was betrothed to Francesco III Gonzaga, Duke of Mantua and Marquess of Montferrat, reflecting her father's desire to strengthen Habsburg influence against France in northern Italy, particularly Milan. Catherine and Francesco were 9 and 10 years old at the time, so the wedding took place six years later on 22 October 1549. In October 1549, Catherine with a dowry of 100,000 Rhine florins was escorted by her elder brother Ferdinand II, Archduke of Austria from Innsbruck to Mantua. The marriage lasted only four months as Francesco drowned in Lake Como on 21 February 1550, and a widowed Catherine returned home to Innsbruck. To improve Catherine's chances of a better second marriage, the Habsburgs claimed that the marriage was not consummated.

== Queen consort of Poland and Lithuania ==
=== Wedding ===
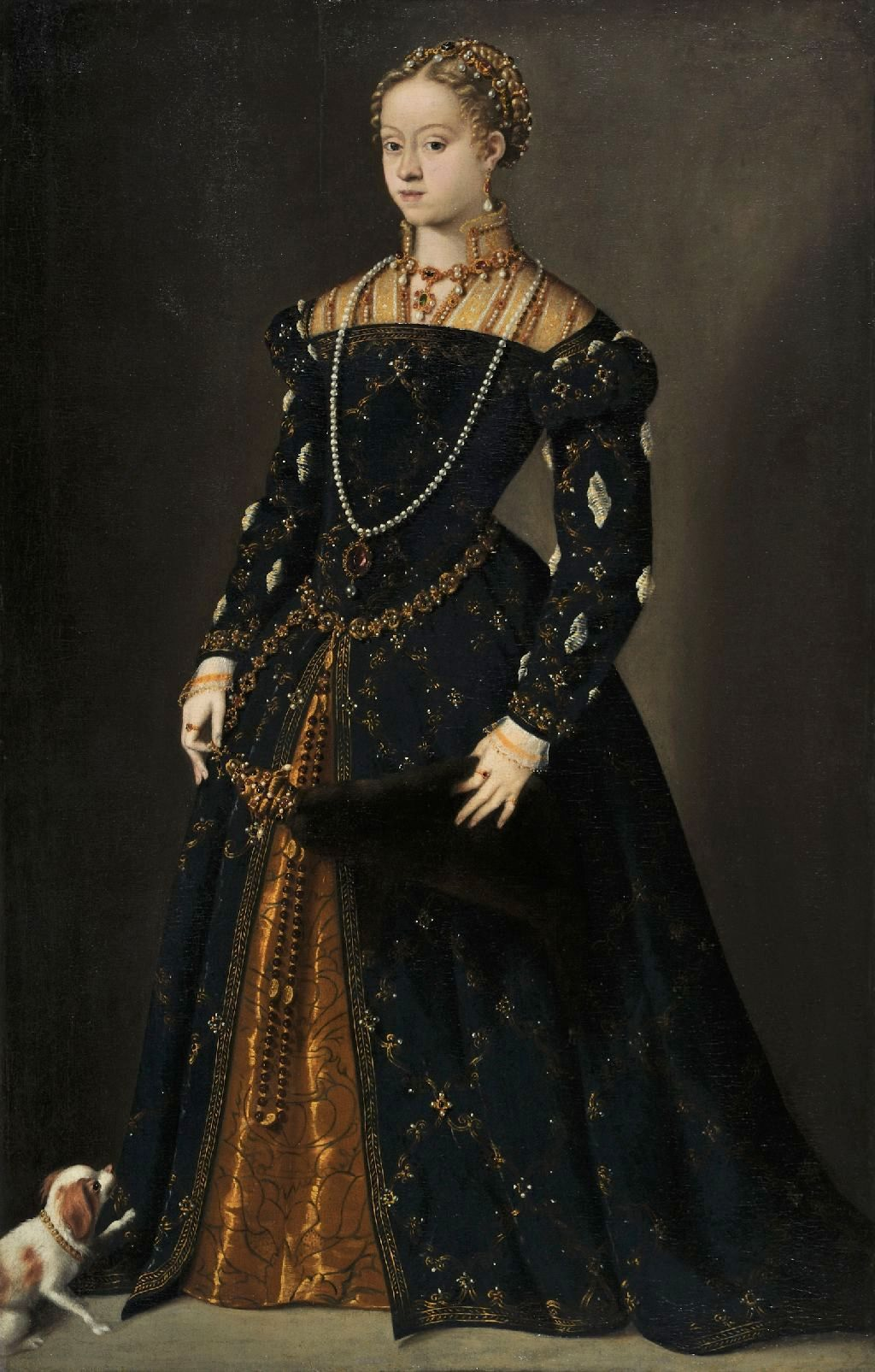
Portrait of young Catherine (Titian, between 1548 and 1549)

In May 1551, after the death of his beloved second wife Barbara Radziwiłł, King-Grand Duke Sigismund II Augustus became a widower. Emperor Ferdinand I pursued the marriage between Catherine and Sigismund to create a pro-Habsburg group within the Polish-Lithuanian court. Particularly, he wanted to prevent Polish assistance to Sigismund's sister Isabella Jagiellon and her son John Sigismund Zápolya in the succession disputes over the Kingdom of Hungary. Both Catherine and Sigismund personally opposed the marriage. Catherine blamed Sigismund of mistreating and causing the early death of her older sister and his first wife Elizabeth of Austria. Sigismund feared that Catherine would be similarly unattractive and of frail health as Elisabeth. However, the Habsburgs threatened to create an anti-Polish alliance with the Tsardom of Russia.

In early 1553, Mikołaj "the Black" Radziwiłł traveled to the court of Ferdinand I, Holy Roman Emperor, in an attempt to persuade the emperor to cease his assistance to Tsar Ivan the Terrible. Radziwiłł had further orders to travel to investigate marriage opportunities with Mechthild of Bavaria or one of the daughters of Ercole II d'Este, Duke of Ferrara. However, the Emperor convinced Radziwiłł that marriage between Catherine and Sigismund was best. Radziwiłł wrote enthusiastic letters to Sigismund, who soon gave in and gave his consent on 10 April 1553. The papal dispensation (they were first cousins once removed) was received on 20 May and the wedding treaty was signed on 23 June. The same day the per procura wedding took place. The actual wedding was delayed due to Sigismund's ill health from 1 July to 30 July. The celebrations lasted 10 days. Catherine's dowry was 100,000 florins as well as 500 grzywnas of silver, 48 expensive dresses, and about 800 jewels.

=== Life with Sigismund ===
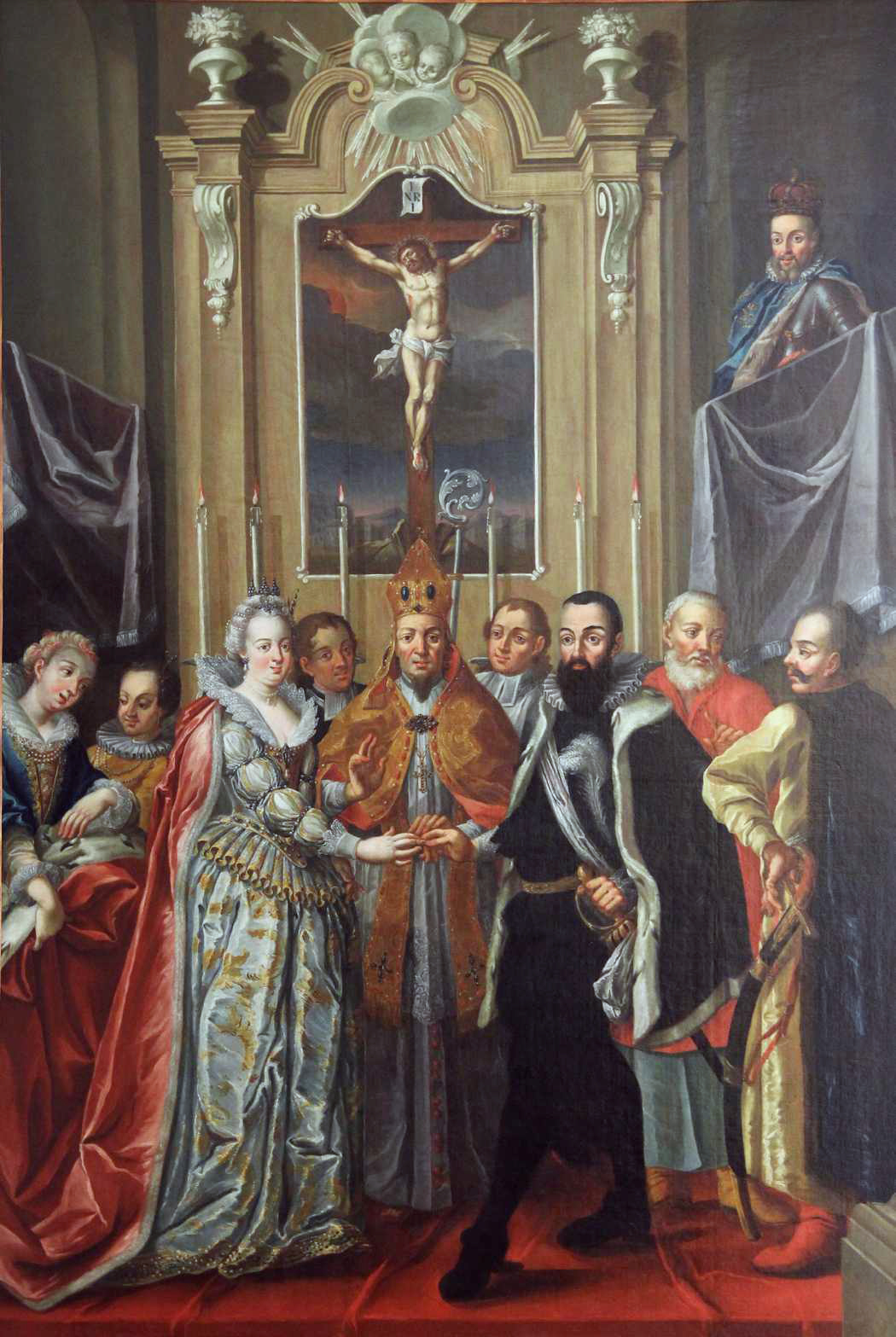
Per procura wedding between Mikołaj "the Black" Radziwiłł and Catherine of Austria (painting from 1752 to 1759)

Catherine spoke Italian and therefore could communicate with Queen mother Bona Sforza and her family. She was ambitious and tried to gain political influence in the Polish-Lithuanian court which caused Sigismund's ire. At least at first, he attempted to do right by his wife – he needed an heir and was acutely aware of the criticism of his treatment of his first wife Elizabeth of Austria. In February 1554, the royal couple separated for the first time. Catherine was in Parczew while Sigismund attended general sejm in Lublin.

==== Possible pregnancy ====
According to royal secretary Michał Trzebuchowski, the Queen was very upset during the separation with her husband in February and March 1554 and kept crying. When Sigismund visited his wife on 9–10 April, Catherine informed him that she was pregnant. During pregnancy the Queen was reported several times to suffer ginecological affliction with "hemmorage" and "mucus" as its symptoms; however, no miscarriage was recorded, and she claimed to still feel her unborn child's movement inside. On 25 May the royal pair reached Vilnius where with short breaks Catherine lived for nine years.

In late summer midwives from her father's court were sent to Lithuania to assist the birth of her child. However, in October of the same year the Queen wrote in the latter to her mother-in-law that there will be no child as "all movements [of the presumed fetus], and all signs have failed". Neither live-birth nor stillbirth was recorded, making unclear whether Catherine was pregnant at all. Sigismund later made two contradictory statements on the matter: that Catherine pretended she is pregnant with the goal to present him with non-royal foundling, or that "because of the hatred to Poland, she made an effort to achieve miscarriage". Modern researchers opinions whether Catherine was pregnant or not are varied. It has been proposed that she might have suffered from the false pregnancy.

==== Failed marriage ====
Relatively normal, albeit somewhat distant, the marriage continued for a few more years. It seems that Catherine accompanied her husband to general sejm in spring 1555 and to the per procura wedding of Sophia Jagiellon and Henry V, Duke of Brunswick-Lüneburg in January 1556. She also continued to mediate between her husband and her father, carried frequent correspondence with Albert, Duke of Prussia, and was known for generally favorable views on Protestantism. Catherine's dowry was paid by her father at the end of 1555 or very early 1556, and on 19 January 1556, she received the towns of Wiślica, Żarnów, Radom, Nowy Korczyn, Kozienice, Chęciny, and Radoszyce.

In the spring of 1556, the Queen mother Bona Sforza returned to her native Italy and her two yet-unmarried daughters, Anna Jagiellon and Catherine Jagiellon, moved to Vilnius. It seems that the three women became close. In summer 1558, the royal family returned to Poland. In October, Catherine became severely ill, but the cause of the illness is unknown as she would not allow Polish doctors near her. When her father sent a couple of Austrian doctors, they reported only high fever and chills. She recovered somewhat only in spring 1559 but her recovery was interrupted by frequent travels in summer 1559 to avoid a plague outbreak. Catherine returned to Vilnius only in early 1560 and became ill again. Sigismund was convinced that it was epilepsy, the same disease that tormented his first wife and Catherine's sister. Their marriage became very distant.

In October 1562, at the wedding of Catherine Jagiellon and Duke John of Finland, the couple saw each other for the last time. Catherine lived in Vilnius and Hrodna before being sent to Radom in April 1563. 40-year-old Sigismund sought to obtain annulment of the marriage as he wanted to marry for the fourth time and secure a male heir. In January 1565, Sigismund complained to papal nuncio Giovanni Francesco Commendone that marriage to Catherine was sinful because she was a sister of his first wife, that she hated Poland, that she caused the miscarriage in 1554, and that he was physically disgusted by his wife due to her epilepsy. Due to Habsburg influence, Pope Pius IV did not allow the divorce.

In July 1564, Ferdinand I, Holy Roman Emperor, died and was succeeded by his son Maximilian II. The new emperor sent his diplomats Andreas Dudith and Wilhelm von Kurzbach to try to reconcile the couple, or if that failed, to convince Sigismund to allow her to leave Poland. The plan for Catherine to leave was discussed in May 1565. Initially Sigismund refused, fearing that it would only increase the anti-Polish sentiment in the Habsburg court, but later changed his mind because he believed that Catherine's departure would make it easier to obtain a divorce. In late 1565, she departed to Wieluń, but Polish nobles interfered and her departure to Vienna was delayed until 8 October 1566. In a letter written to Albert, Duke of Prussia, a day before her departure, Catherine expressed her resolve to one day return to Poland.

Catherine did not receive a warm welcome in Vienna as she was blamed for the failed marriage. Emperor Maximilian II extended her stay and wanted to meet with Sigismund personally to discuss the issue, but he refused. In March 1567, Andreas Dudith relayed that Sigismund categorically refused to live with Catherine (reportedly, he once said that he would gladly become a monk if that meant he could get rid of Catherine) and that he would not protest if Catherine remained in Austria. Sigismund would not specify where Catherine should live if she returned to Poland and would not allot money for her court, in effect precluding her from returning. In June 1567, Catherine became seriously ill with what doctors called melancholia. After recovering, in October, she moved to Linz to live out the remaining five years of her life.

According to a witness, Catherine lived like a widow. She received 28,000 guldens annually from Sigismund for her court of more than fifty people. She was visited by her family, she studied the Bible and other theological works, and established a garden for medicinal herbs which produced various herbal remedies. It seems that she still wanted to return to Poland: she tearfully asked Giovanni Francesco Commendone for help when he visited her twice and kept writing letters to her husband. In her last will, she asked her husband for forgiveness and left him all the jewellery she had received from him. The majority of her money was left for charity.

Catherine died on 28 February 1572 and was buried in castle's chapel. When Rudolf II, Holy Roman Emperor, ordered reconstruction of the castle, her body was moved to the St. Florian Monastery on 22 September 1599. A funeral was not organized until 22 September 1614 during the reign of Emperor Matthias. The surviving sarcophagus was built in 1781.

== Ancestors ==
Ancestors of Catherine of Austria, Queen of Poland

8. Maximilian I, Holy Roman Emperor
4. Philip I of Castile
9. Mary, Duchess of Burgundy
2. Ferdinand I, Holy Roman Emperor
10. Ferdinand II of Aragon
5. Joanna I of Castile
11. Isabella I of Castile
1. Catherine of Austria
12. Casimir IV Jagiellon
6. Vladislaus II of Bohemia and Hungary
13. Elisabeth of Austria
3. Anne of Bohemia and Hungary
14. Gaston de Foix, Count of Candale
7. Anne of Foix-Candale
15. Catherine of Foix

Catherine of Austria, Queen of Poland House of Habsburg Born: 15 September 1533 Died: 28 February 1572
Royal titles
Previous: Barbara Radziwiłł	Queen consort of Poland; Grand Duchess consort of Lithuania; 1553–1572	Next: Anne of Austria
