= Venkata Raju =

Venkata Raju or Venkataraju is an Indian name.

- Kolanka Venkata Raju, famous Mridangam artist.
- Manthena Venkata Raju, was an Indian politician and social worker.
- M. Venkataraju, an Indian film music director.
- Thotakura Venkata Raju, better known as T. V. Raju, an Indian film music director.
