= Bačiulis =

- Lithuanian surname
- m.: Bačiulis
- f.: (unmarried): Bačiulytė
- f.: (married): Bačiulienė

Bačiulis is a Lithuanian language family name. It may refer to:

- Irena Bačiulytė (born 1939), Lithuanian rower
- Vidmantas Bačiulis, Lithuanian screenwriter, film and TV film director
