= Jerzy Radziwiłł =

Lithuanian noble (1480–1541)

- Grand Hetman of Lithuania
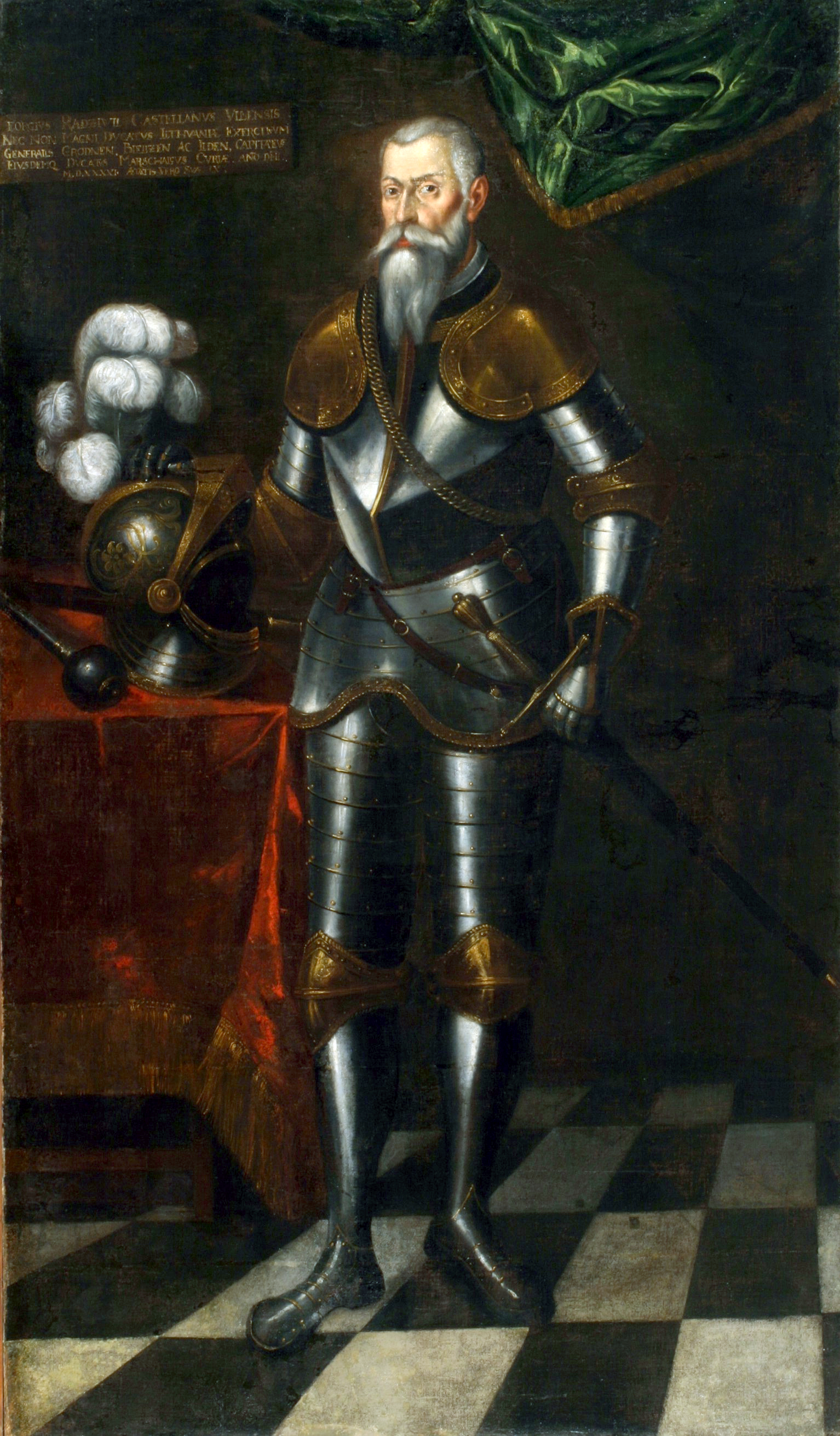
- 17th century portrait
- Born: 1480
- Died: April 1541 (aged 60–61)
- Noble family: Radziwiłł
- Spouses: Barbara Kiszka h. Dąbrowa; Barbara Kola h. Junosza
- Issue: with Barbara Kola: Mikołaj "the Red" Radziwiłł; Anna Elżbieta Radziwiłł; Barbara, Queen of Poland
- Father: Mikalojus Radvila the Old
- Mother: Sofija Ona Manvydaitė

Jerzy Radziwiłł (Lithuanian: Jurgis Radvila; 1480 – April 1541), nicknamed "Hercules", was a Lithuanian nobleman.

He was deputy cup-bearer of Lithuania from 1510, voivode of Kiev, Field Lithuanian Hetman in 1521, castellan of Trakai from 1522, castellan of Vilnius from 1527, Marshal of the Court from 1528, Grand Lithuanian Hetman from 1531, Starost of Hrodna, Namiestnik of Vilnius, Maišiagala, Merkinė, Utena, Mozyrsk, Lida, Skidal, Bielica, Kryńsk and Oziersk. He was a progenitor of the Biržai–Dubingiai (also known as Protestant) Radziwiłł family line.

He was renowned for his military achievements and as a talented politician. He took part in various conflicts against Muscovy, the Cossacks and the Tatars. Achieving around 30 military victories, he has been referred to as the Lithuanian Hercules.

In 1526 as a member of the Lithuanian Council of Lords he unsuccessfully petitioned the Grand Duke of Lithuania Sigismund I the Old for the renewal of a Kingdom of Lithuania under the rule of Sigismund the Old's son, Sigismund II Augustus. In the 1530s, acting with his brother Jan Radziwiłł, he was in almost total control of Lithuania's internal affairs.

As a member of the influential Radziwiłł family, Jerzy worked to increase his family estate. With his death it was inherited by his only son Mikołaj Radziwiłł the Red. He had two daughters, of whom the younger Barbara Radziwiłł became mistress and later queen to King of Poland and Grand Duke of Lithuania Sigismund II Augustus, which greatly strengthened the Radziwiłł family's position in Poland and Lithuania.

== Marriage and issue ==
He married Barbara Kiszka h. Dąbrowa and later Barbara Kola h. Junosza. They had three children:

- Mikołaj Radziwiłł the Red (1512–1584), who would later become Grand Lithuanian Hetman, married to Katarzyna Tomicka from Iwno h. Łodzia;
- Anna Elżbieta Radziwiłł (1518–1558), married Symeon Holszański Dubrowicki h. Hipocentaur and marszałek of Volhynia Piotr Kiszka h. Dąbrowa (died 1550) in 1548;
- Barbara Radziwiłł (1520–1551), married Stanislovas Goštautas and, after his death in 1547, secretly married king of Poland Sigismund II Augustus and was crowned the queen consort the following year, despite protests by the Sejm and the Senate.
