= Hieraniony Castle =

Former castle near Hieraniony, Belarus

Coordinates: 54°06′48″N 25°34′45″E

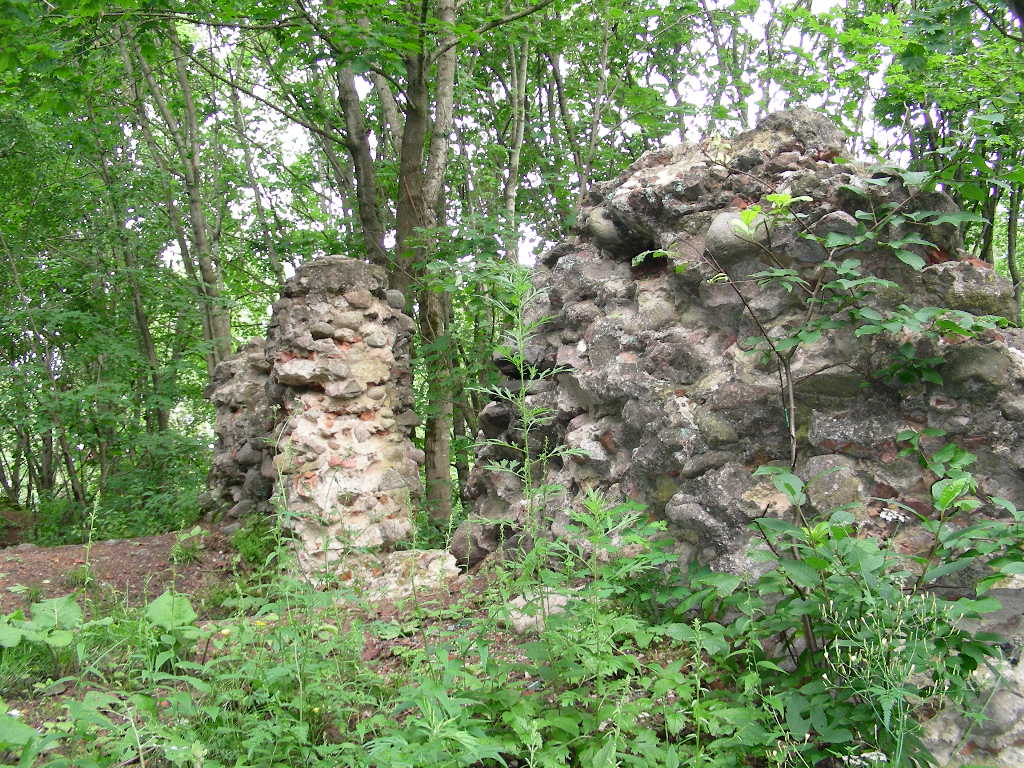
A fragment of the ruin

Hieraniony or Gieraniony Castle is a ruined castle near the village of Hieraniony in Iwye District, Belarus. It was constructed in the beginning of 16th century as the main residence of Albertas Goštautas, one of the most powerful noblemen in the Grand Duchy of Lithuania. Later it belonged to the Sapieha and Kiszka families. It was destroyed by the Russian army during the Russo-Polish War (1654–67).

In the early 19th century the castle, already considerably ruined, was mostly disassembled and the bricks were reused for buildings in the neighbouring towns. Earthworks survive, but are overgrown with trees. Both the castle and the church near it are Category II objects of national heritage.
