= Paweł Antoni Załuski =

Polish Roman Catholic Bishop (1655–1719)

Paweł Antoni Załuski (1655–1719) was an 18th-century Roman Catholic Bishop of Płock in Poland.

Born in 1665 at Kraków into the influential Junosza noble family, he was related to Andrzej Stanisław Załuski, Bishop of Kraków, Józef Andrzej Załuski, Bishop of Kiev, Andrzej Chryzostom Załuski and his boss Ludwik Bartłomiej Załuski.

On 19 May 1710 was appointed auxiliary bishop of Płock, Poland and titular bishop of Alba, Africa. He was bishop from 1709 until 1719.
