= Saints Peter and Paul Church, Iwye =

Church in Iwye, Belarus

Saints Peter and Paul Church
- Касцёл cвятых Пятра і Паўла
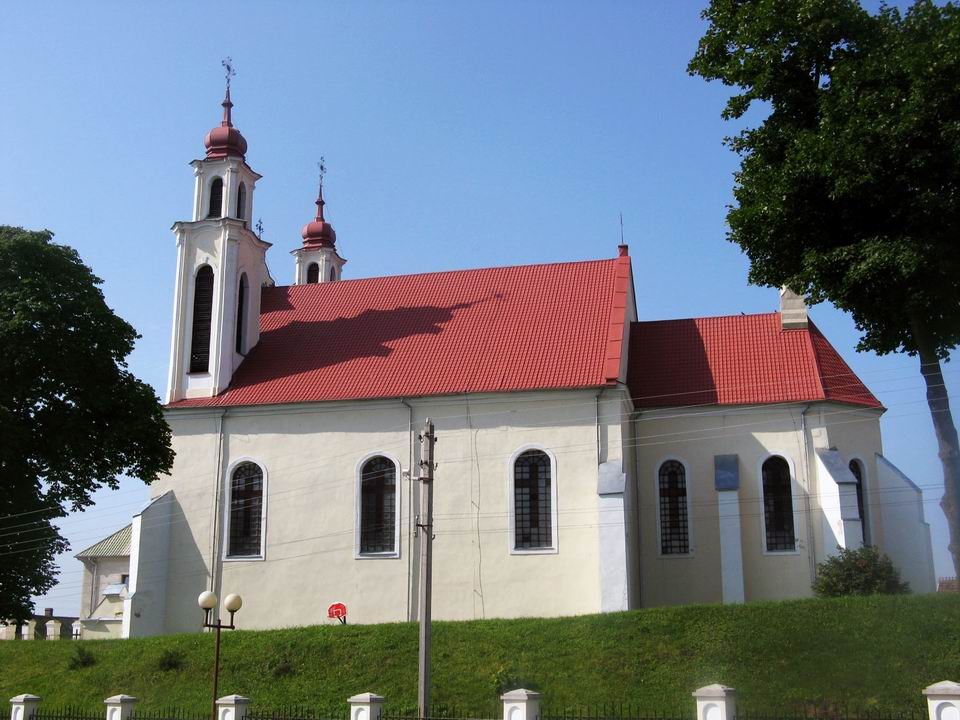
- General view

Religion
- Affiliation: Roman Catholic

Location
- Location: Iwye, Belarus
- Interactive map of Saints Peter and Paul Church
- Coordinates: 53°55′57.25″N 25°46′51.16″E

Architecture
- Type: Church
- Style: Late Gothic and Baroque
- Materials: clay bricks

Saints Peter and Paul Church in the town of Iwye, Belarus, is a Brick Gothic church, partly altered in Baroque fashion. It is currently an active Roman Catholic church belonging to the Diocese of Grodno. It is included in the list of protected historical and cultural heritage of Belarus.

Built in the 15th century, from 1491 to 1495, the church became Protestant and then, in the 17th century, Catholic again. For a long time a Bernardine monastery existed near the church.
