= Iwye =

Town in Grodno region, Belarus

Iwye: Іўе (Belarusian); Ивье (Russian)
- Town
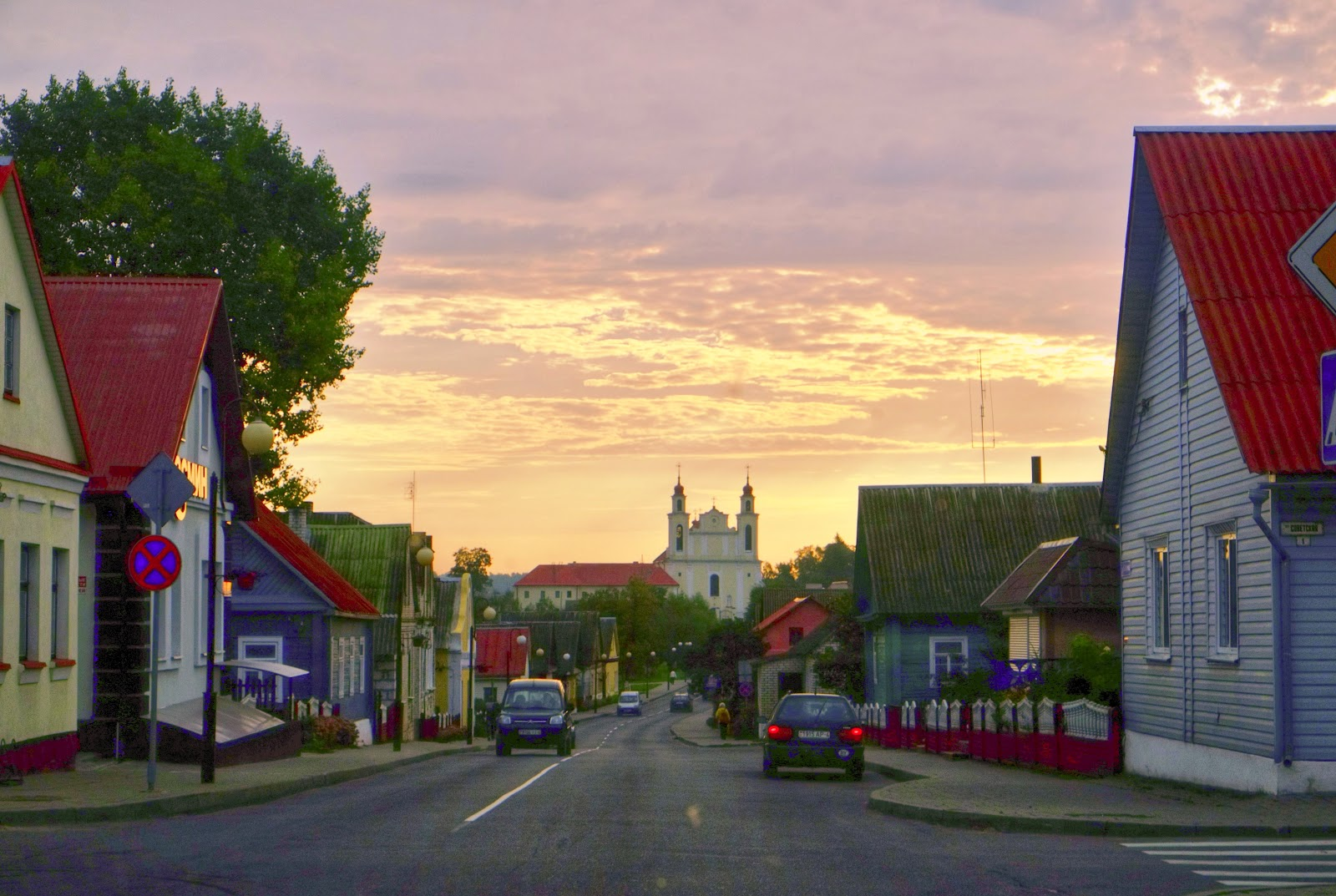

- Location within Belarus
- Coordinates: 53°55′N 25°46′E
- Country: Belarus
- Region: Grodno
- District: Iwye

Population (2025)
  - Total: 6,906
- Time zone: UTC+3 (MSK)
- Postal code: 231337
- Area code: +375 1595
- License plate: 4

Iwye (Note: Belarusian: Іўе, romanized: Iŭje, IPA: [ˈiʊje]; Russian: Ивье, romanized: Ivye, IPA: [ˈivʲjɪ]; Lithuanian: Yvija; Polish: Iwie; Yiddish: איוויע, romanized: Ivye) is a town in Grodno region, Belarus. It is the administrative center of Iwye district. As of 2025, Iwye has a population of 6,906.

Iwye was historically a multicultural settlement with a Jewish majority, but nearly all of the town's Jews were killed by the Nazis in the Holocaust. The architecture of many buildings in Iwye were influenced by the town's historical Lipka Tatar community.

== Geography ==
Iwye is the administrative center of the Iwye district of Grodno region. It is located 158 kilometres (98 mi) east of the regional capital Grodno.

== History ==
Iwye was historically a multiethnic and religiously diverse settlement with a Jewish majority. Beginning in the 15th century, the area was settled by Jews, Roman Catholics, Eastern Orthodox Christians, and Muslim Lipka Tatars. There was also an Arian community in Iwye in the 16th century. Iwye's population was over three-quarters Jewish by 1938, and the town had a Tarbut school, an association football team, a fire brigade, a theater, and an orchestra.

The Jewish community of Iwye was devastated by the mass killings of the Holocaust during World War II. In 1942, Nazi German troops executed 2,500 Jews by shooting in the nearby forest of Stonevichi, while 1,000 were confined to a ghetto in the town's north. A small group of 80 Jews survived by hiding or joining local partisans in their fight against the Nazis. The railway line from Lida to Maladzyechna, which stopped at Iwye and was used by the Nazis, was destroyed by partisans during the war. After the war ended, the Holocaust survivors were "repatriated" to Poland, as control over Iwye changed from prewar Poland to the Soviet Union. Seven Jewish families remained in Iwye until the dissolution of the Soviet Union in 1991, and they all moved to Israel soon thereafter. In 2009, the Belarusian government opened a museum in Iwye commemorating the town's Jewish history.

== Architecture ==
The architecture of Iwye has been influenced by the Lipka Tatar community in particular, with the wooden mosque remaining a landmark of the town and Iwye bearing the nickname "the Tatar capital of Belarus". The mosque was built in 1882 and was the only mosque in the Byelorussian Soviet Socialist Republic.

The Saints Peter and Paul Church is a Roman Catholic church protected by the Belarusian government as part of the country's "historical and cultural heritage".

== Demographics ==
There are 6,906 people living in Iwye as of 2025.

== Notable people ==
- Chaim Ozer Grodzinski (1863–1940), rabbi of Vilnius
- Moshe Shatzkes (1881–1958), rabbi of Iwye

== See also ==
- Jewish ghettos established by Nazi Germany
