= Barbara Kolanka =

Polish noblewoman (died 1550)

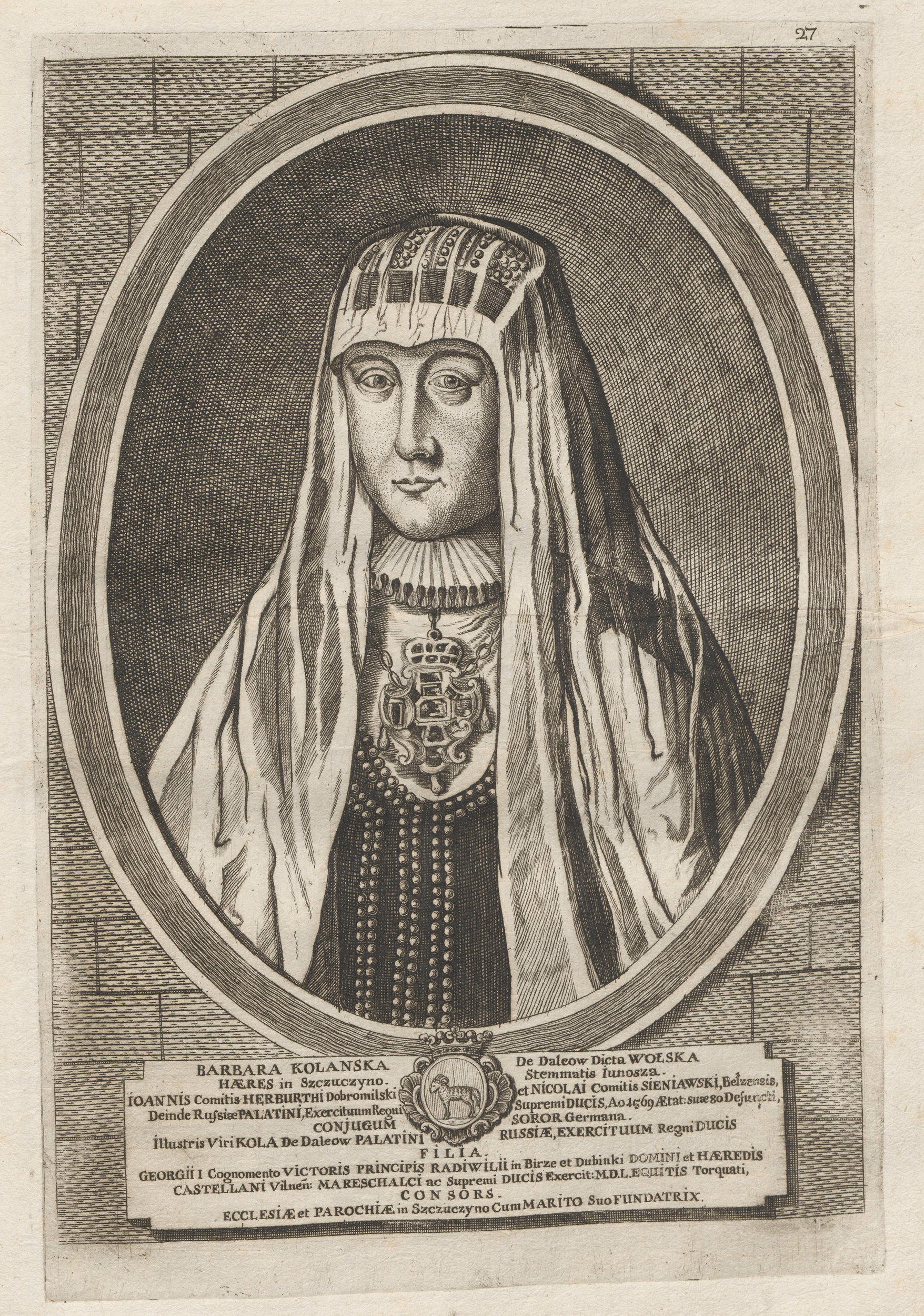
- Coat of arms: Junosza
- Born: c. late 15th century Dalejów (now Daliowa, Podkarpackie Voivodeship)
- Died: 1550
- Family: House of Koła (by birth); Radziwiłł (by marriage)
- Spouse: Jerzy Radziwiłł h. Trąby
- Issue: with Jerzy Radziwiłł: Mikołaj "the Red" Radziwiłł; Anna Elżbieta Radziwiłł; Barbara Radziwiłł
- Father: Paweł Koła h. Junosza
- Mother: Bruneta z Chodcza h. Ogończyk

Barbara Kolanka (also Barbara Kołówna; herbu Junosza; born c. late 15th century – died 1550) was a Polish noblewoman born in the village of Dalejów, in what is today Daliowa, Podkarpackie Voivodeship., in southeastern Poland in the late 15th century. She is best known as the mother of queen Barbara Radziwiłł and Mikołaj "the Red" Radziwiłł.

== Biography ==
A direct descendant to Elisabeth of Pilcza, the Queen consort to Ladislaus II of Poland, she was born in late 15th century to Paweł Koła (or Kola) of Dalejów and Żółtanice (1450-1509), a prominent Polish politician and his wife, Bruneta Chodkiewicz (1458-1550). Her father was a Chamberlain (since 1490) and castellan of Halicz who in 1502 rose to the rank of Voivod of Podolia. She had three older brothers, one of whom (Jan Koła) rose to the rank of Grand Hetman of The Crown.

== Marriage and issue ==
In ca. 1515 she married Jerzy "Herkules" Radziwiłł. They had three children:

- Mikołaj "the Red" Radziwiłł (1512–1584), who would later become Grand Hetman of Lithuania, married to Katarzyna Tomnicka-Lwińska h. Łodzia
- Anna Elżbieta Radziwiłł (1518–1558), married marszałek of Volhynia Piotr Kiszka h. Dąbrowa (died 1550) in 1549, and later Symeon Holszański Dubrowicki h. Hipocentaur.
- Barbara Radziwiłł (1520/1523–1551), married firstly Stanislovas Goštautas. As a widow, in 1547, she secretly married king of Poland Sigismund II Augustus and was declared the Queen consort the following year; crowned in 1550 despite protests by the King's mother Queen Bona, the Sejm and the Senate.
