= Giovanni Francesco Commendone =

Italian cardinal

Giovanni Francesco Commendone (17 March 1523 – 26 December 1584) was an Italian cardinal and papal nuncio.

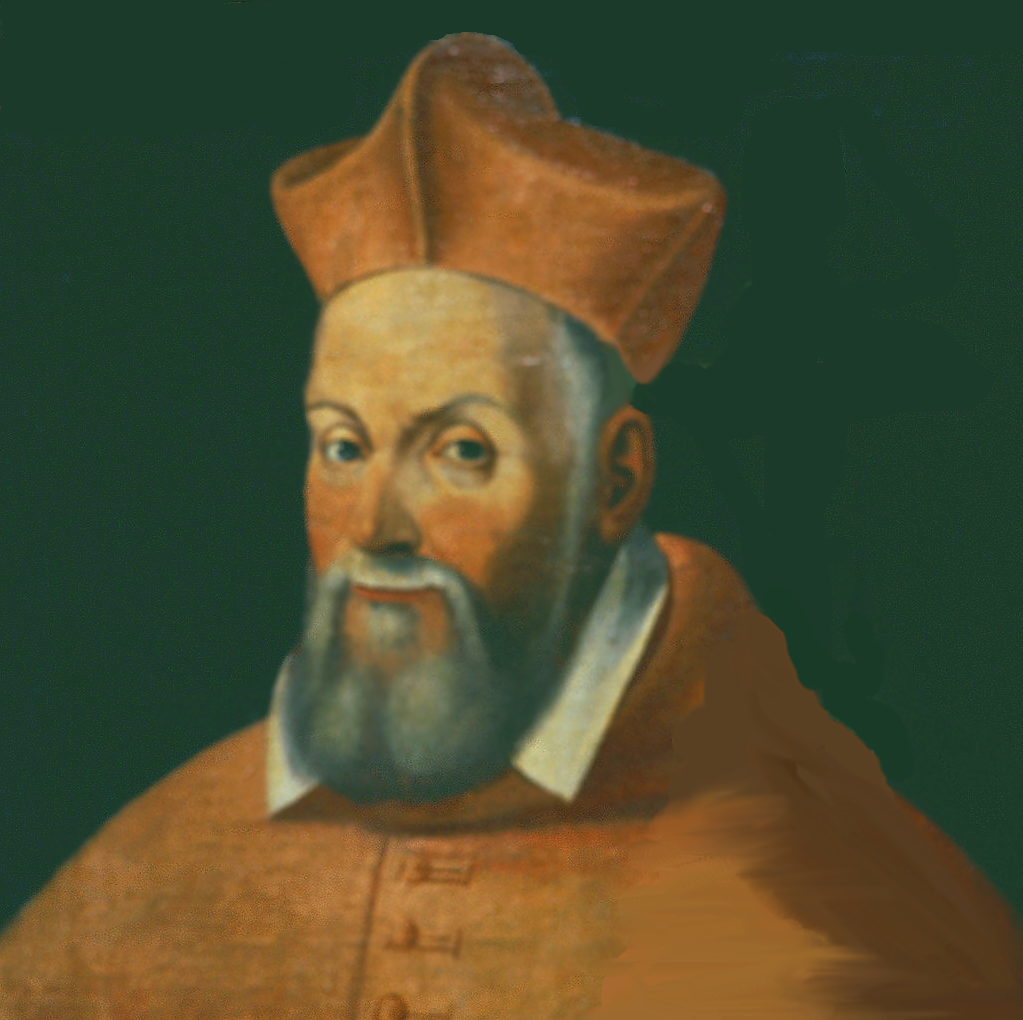
Cardinal Giovanni Francesco Commendone, papal diplomat

== Life ==
Commendone was born at Venice. After an education in the humanities and in jurisprudence at the University of Padua, he came to Rome in 1550. The ambassador of Venice presented him to Pope Julius III, who appointed him one of his secretaries.

After successfully performing various papal missions of minor importance, he accompanied Cardinal Legate Girolamo Dandini to the Netherlands, whence Pope Julius III sent him in 1553 on an important mission to Queen Mary Tudor, who had just succeeded Edward VI on the English throne. He was to treat with the new queen concerning the restoration of the Catholic faith in England.

Accompanied by Penning, a servant and confidant of Cardinal Reginald Pole, Commendone arrived in London on 8 August 1553. Though Mary Tudor was a loyal Catholic, she was surrounded at court by numerous opponents of papal authority, who made it difficult for Commendone to obtain a secret interview with her. By chance he met John Lee, a relation of the Duke of Norfolk and an attendant at court, with whom he had become acquainted in Italy, and Lee succeeded in arranging the interview. Mary received Commendone kindly, and expressed her desire to restore the Catholic Faith and to acknowledge the spiritual authority of the pope, but considered it prudent to act slowly on account of her powerful opponents, Commendone hastened to Rome, arriving there on 11 September, and informed the pope of the news, at the same time handing him a personal letter from the queen.

Commendone continued to hold the office of papal secretary under Pope Paul IV, who esteemed him very highly and in return for his services appointed him bishop of Kephalonia and Zacynthus in 1555. In the summer of 1556 he accompanied Cardinal Legate Scipione Rebiba on a papal mission to the Netherlands, to the courts of Charles V, Holy Roman Emperor and King Philip II of Spain, the consort of Queen Mary of England. Commendone had received instructions to remain as nuncio at the court of Philip, but he was recalled to Rome soon after his arrival in the Netherlands. On 16 September of the same year the pope sent him as extraordinary legate to the Governments of Urbino, Ferrara, Venice, and Parma in order to obtain help against the Spanish troops who were occupying the Campagna and threatening Rome.

In 1560, when Pope Pius IV determined to reopen the Council of Trent, Commendone was sent as legate to Germany to invite the Catholic and Protestant Estates to the council. He arrived in Vienna on 3 January 1561, and after consulting with Emperor Ferdinand, set out on 14 January for Naumburg, where the Protestant Estates were holding a religious convention, He was accompanied by Delfino, Bishop of Lesina, who had been sent as papal nuncio to Ferdinand four months previously and was still at the imperial court. Having arrived at Naumburg on 28 January, they were admitted to the convention on 5 February and urged upon the assembled Protestant Estates the necessity of a Protestant representation at the Council of Trent in order to restore religious union, but all their efforts were of no avail. From Naumburg, Commendone traveled northward to invite the Estates of Northern Germany. He went by way of Leipzig and Magdeburg to Berlin, where he arrived on 19 February and was well received by Joachim of Münsterberg, the Elector of Brandenburg. Joachim spoke respectfully of the pope and the Catholic Church and expressed his desire for a religious reconciliation, but did not promise to appear at the council. Here Commendone met also the son of Joachim, the young Archbishop Sigismund of Magdeburg, who promised to appear at the council but did not keep his word.

Leaving Berlin, Commendone visited Beeskow, Wolfenbüttel, Hanover, Hildesheim, Iburg, Paderborn, Cologne, Cleves, the Netherlands, and Aachen, inviting all the Estates he met in these places. From Aachen he turned to Lübeck with the intention of crossing the sea to invite Kings Frederick II of Denmark and Eric XIV of Sweden. The King of Denmark, however, refused to receive the legate, while the King of Sweden invited him to England, whither he had planned to go in the near future. Queen Elizabeth I of England had forbidden the papal nuncio Hieronimo Martinengo to cross the English Channel when he was sent to invite the queen to the council, hence it was very improbable that she would allow Commendone to come to England. He therefore repaired to Antwerp, awaiting further instructions from Rome. Being recalled by the pope, he returned to Italy in December, 1561, by way of Lorraine and Western Germany. The numerous letters which Commendone wrote during this mission to Charles Borromeo present a picture of the ecclesiastical conditions in Germany during those times. These and others were published in "Miscellanea di Storia Italiana" (Turin, 1869, VI, 1-240).

In January 1563, the legates of the Council of Trent sent Commendone to Emperor Ferdinand at Innsbruck, to treat with him regarding some demands which he had made upon the council in his "Libel (Latin: libellus="little book, tract," not modern English "libel") of Reformation." In October of the same year Pius IV sent him as legate to King Sigismund II of Poland with instruction to induce this ruler to give political recognition to the Tridentine decrees. Yielding to the requests of Commendone and of Hosius, Bishop of Ermland, Sigismund not only enforced the Tridentine reforms, but also allowed the Jesuits, the most hated enemies of the Reformers, to enter Poland. While still in Poland, on the recommendation of Charles Borromeo, Commendone was created cardinal on 12 March 1565.

He remained in Poland until the death of Pius IV (9 December 1565), and before returning to Italy he went as legate of the new pope, Pope Pius V, to the Diet of Augsburg, which was opened by Emperor Maximilian II on 23 March 1566. He had previously warned the emperor under pain of excommunication not to discuss religion at the diet. He also seized the opportunity to exhort the assembled Estates to carry into execution the Tridentine decrees. In September 1568, Pius V sent him a second time as legate to Maximilian II. With Biglia, the resident nuncio at Vienna, he was to induce the emperor to make no new religious concessions to the Protestant Estates of Lower Austria and to recall several concessions which he had already made. While engaged in this mission, Commendone was also empowered by a papal Brief dated 10 October 1568, to make an apostolic visitation of the churches and monasteries of Germany and the adjacent provinces. An account of this visitation in the diocese of Passau and diocese of Salzburg in the year 1569 is published in "Studien und Mittheilungen aus dem Benedictiner und Cistercienser Orden" (Brünn, 1893, XIV, 385-398 and 567-589).

In November 1571, Pius V sent him as legate to the emperor and to King Sigismund of Poland in the interest of a crusade. After the death of King Sigismund, in 1572, he promoted the election of Henry, Duke of Anjou, as King of Poland, thereby incurring the displeasure of the emperor. Upon his return to Italy in 1573, Pope Gregory XIII appointed him a member of the newly founded Congregatio Germanica, the purpose of which was to safeguard Catholic interests in Germany. When Gregory XIII fell dangerously ill, it was generally believed that Commendone would be elected pope, but he was outlived by Gregory. He died at Padua.
