= Iwye district =

District of Grodno region, Belarus

Iwye district Іўеўскі раён (Belarusian) Ивьевский район (Russian)
- District
- Flag Coat of arms

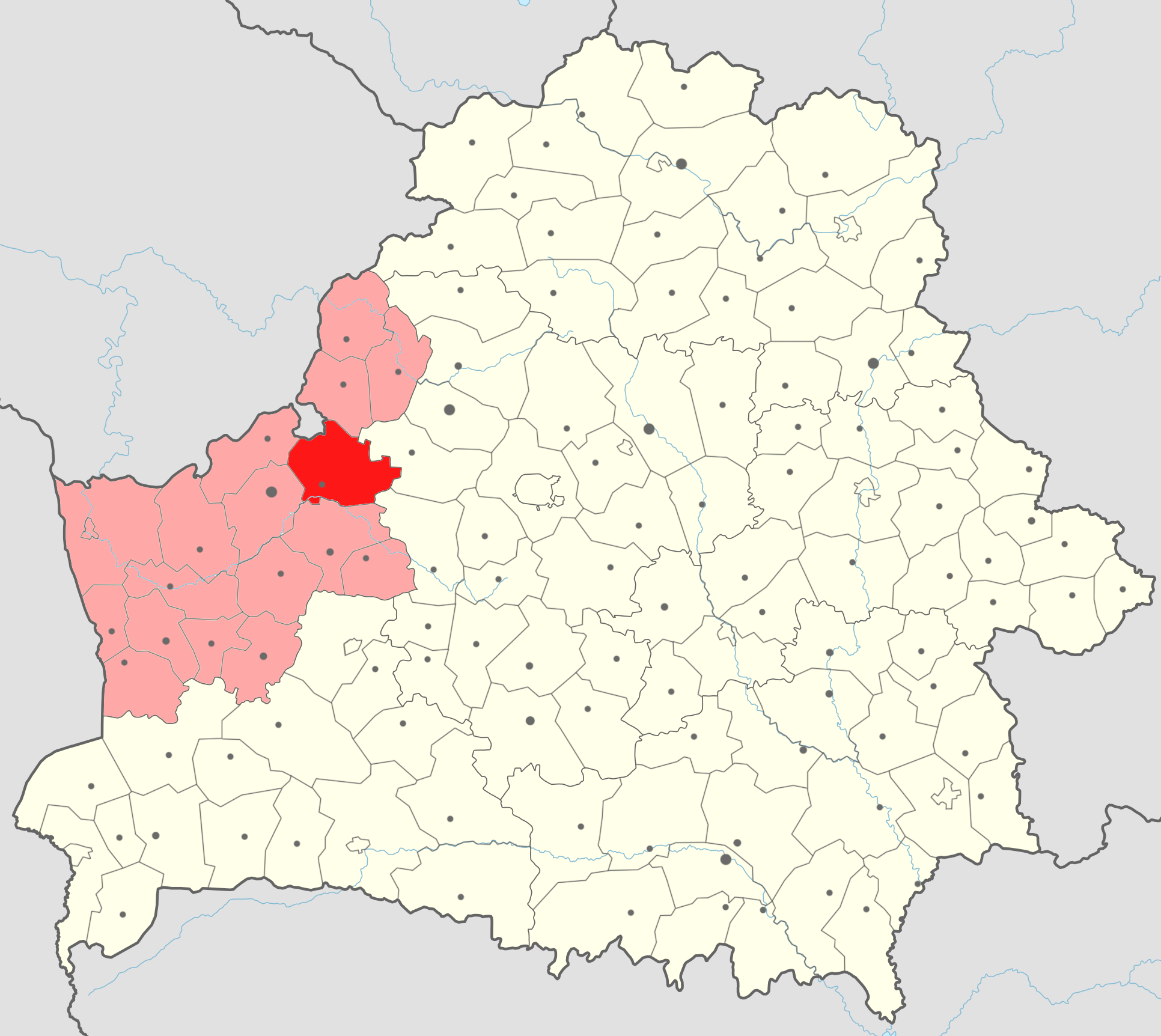
- Coordinates: 53°55′N 25°46′E
- Country: Belarus
- Region: Grodno region
- Administrative center: Iwye

Area
  - District: 1,841 km^{2} (711 sq mi)

Population (2024)
  - District: 19,524
  - Density: 10.61/km^{2} (27.47/sq mi)
  - Urban: 8,452
  - Rural: 11,072
- Time zone: UTC+3 (MSK)

Iwye district or Iŭje district (Belarusian: Іўеўскі раён, romanized: Iŭeŭski rajon; Russian: Ивьевский район) is a district (raion) of Grodno region in Belarus. The administrative center is Iwye. Another notable settlement is Hyeranyony, a small historic town with two Category II objects of national cultural heritage (the castle and the parish church). As of 2024, it has a population of 19,524.
