= Junosza coat of arms =

Polish coat of arms

Junosza
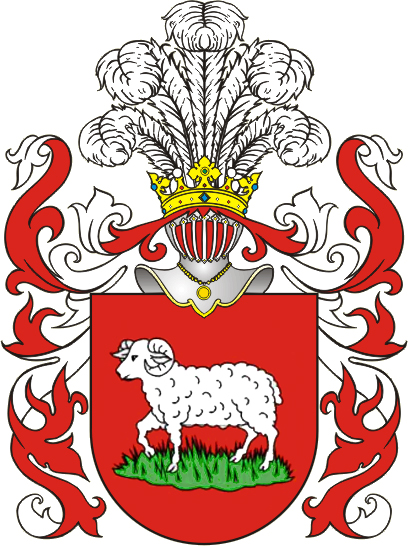
- Battle cry: Junosza
- Alternative names: Agnus, Baran, Barany
- Earliest mention: 1335
- Towns: none
- Families: 329 names altogether. (Note: Names including: Badyński, Bancarewicz, Baniaszewicz, Bańkowski, Baran, Barancewicz, Baranowicz, Barzyk, Bądzyński, Beliński, Beniuszewicz, Bieliński, Bilański, Bojan, Bojanowicz, Bojanowski, Boniński, Borawski, Borcikowski, Borkowski, Borowski, Borukowski, Borwicz, Bujanowski, Bukar, Chabowski, Chądzeński, Chądzewski, Chociszewski, Chodecki, Chomętowski, Chrapuński, Chrościński, Chruściński, Chudzewski, Cieksiński, Cieśliński, Czarnochowski, Czechanowski, Czerniewski, Daczewski, Dalawski, Dalecki, Dalejowski, Daszewski, Dąbkowski, Dąbrowski, Derpowski, Doganowski, Dolecki, Domin, Dorożyński, Dorpowski, Drewnowski, Drowanowski, Drużbic, Drużdowicz, Dubkowski, Dziaskowski, Dzięgliński, Gałązka, Gałązkowski, Gałdecki, Gałecki, Gęś, Gigański, Girkont, Glinicki, Gładczyński, Głębocki, Godlewski, Golankowski, Gołczyński, Gołęski, Gostkowski, Gościmirski, Goślinowski, Gotsch, Górny, Grochowski, Gulczewski, Gumencki, Gumowski, Gzowski, Haliński, Hannowiecki, Hermanowski, Hoffman, Horyszewski, Humiecki, Humięcki, Igański, Ignański, Janicz, Janiszewski, Jankowski, Jarosławski, Jonasz, Junisic, Junosza, Junoszyc, Kalm-Podoski, Kamieniewski, Karkowski, Karnkowski, Karpołuski, Kawaniewski, Kienowski, Kiernoski, Kierowski, Kijowski, Kisieleński, Kisielewski, Kisieliński, Klewski, Kliński, Kola, Koluszkowski, Koła, Koło, Kołon, Kołowski, Komarnicki, Komiński, Koniński, Koniuski, Konopacki, Kormanicki, Koskowski, Kosmaczewski, Kostkowski, Kotulski, Kowalewski, Kowieski, Koza, Kozikowski, Krogulecki, Ksronowski, Kruszyński, Krzepczowski, Krzykowski, Kurdwanowski, Kurnicki, Kuronowski, Kuskowski, Kuszelewicz, Kuszewski, Kuszkowski, Kuszycki, Kuszyński, Kuturmański, Lelelewski, Lelowski, Lipicki, Lipnicki, Lochocki, Łatosek, Łempicki, Łochocki, Ługowski, Łypicki, Łypnicki, Malicki, Małynicz, Materni, Mierzyński, Mieszkowski, Międzobrocki, Międzobrodzki, Mokrzeski, Mokrzski, Niegorzewski, Niewski, Nijowski, Niowski, Niwski, Nowołoński, Odnodzki, Odznodzki, Ojrzanowski, Omieciński, Oparski, Opraski, Orłowski, Orpiszewski, Orwitowski, Osiński, Ostasiński, Ostrakowski, Ostrzakowski, Ostrzeniewski, Ostrzykowski, Ostrzyniewski, Oświeciński, Owada, Oyrzanowski, Peredko, Petraszewicz, Pętkowski, Piankowski, Pianowski, Piaskowski, Pieskowski, Pieszkowski, Pietrowski, Pijanowski, Piotroski, Piotrowin, Piotrowski, Plebański, Pławiński, Podolski, Podoski, Polchowski, Polikowski, Polkowski, Połchowski, Poniatowski, Przedojewski, Przedojowski, Przedzewski, Przedzowski, Przerownicki, Przędzowski, Przyrownicki, Pucdrowski, Puciłowski, Pulikowski, Puzdrowski, Rachański, Rachocki, Radosz, Radziejowski, Radziewanowski, Rahański, Ratajski, Ratowski, Rautenberg, Retowski, Rosperski, Rospierski, Rościszewski, Rotowicz, Rubel, Runowski, Rupeyko, Rupeykowicz, Ruszalski, Rzeński, Rzeszotarski, Rzeszotko, Saporowski, Segrowski, Sergowski, Sęp, Sianowski, Skiedrowski, Skoroszewski, Skoruszewski, Słuszkowski, Służkowski, Smłodowski, Smogorzewski, Sobański, Starzyński, Stefanowski, Stempowski, Stępkowski, Stępowski, Stkrwiński, Stoiński, Stopiński, Strkwiński, Struściński, Suchodolski, Sulerzyński, Sułocki, Sypiński, Szaniawski, Szarlej, Szarleński, Szarzeński, Szarzyński, Szetyński, Szymanowicz, Ścibor, Śliwiński, Świszulski, Tabacz, Tabasz, Trojan, Ubniewski, Ugniewski, Umiecki, Umieniecki, Uszaniecki, Wańtuch, Wdowiński, Widleński, Widliński, Wielecki, Wielicki, Winiecki, Wojsław, Wojsławski, Wojtycki, Wolski, Wostołcho, Woysław, Woysławski, Wsciślicki, Wściślicki, Wyrębowski, Wysokiński, Zaboj, Zagrzewski, Zaliwski, Załuski, Zamojski, Zamoytel, Zawadzki, Zawłocki, Zbożny, Zdrodowski, Zdrojewski, Zdrojowski, Żakowski, Żemoytel, Żomoytel, Żukowski)

Junosza is a Polish coat of arms.

== Notable bearers ==
Notable bearers of this coat of arms include:

- House of Borawski Pawel 1849
- Franciszek Bieliński
- House of Borkowski
- House of Karnkowski
  - Stanisław Karnkowski
  - Jan Karnkowski
- House of Koła
  - Barbara Kolanka
- House of Ojrzanowski / Oyrzanowski
- House of Sobański
- Hieronim Radziejowski
- Józef Zaliwski
- House of Załuski
  - Marcin Załuski
  - Paweł Antoni Załuski
  - Louis Bartholomew Załuski
  - Andrzej Chryzostom Załuski
- Konstanty Felicjan Szaniawski, bishop

== Gallery ==
Counts Borkowski

Counts Borkowski

Borowiec (odm.)

== See also ==
- Polish heraldry
- Heraldic family
- List of Polish nobility coats of arms

== Bibliography ==
- Tadeusz Gajl: Herbarz polski od średniowiecza do XX wieku : ponad 4500 herbów szlacheckich 37 tysięcy nazwisk 55 tysięcy rodów. L&L, 2007. ISBN 978-83-60597-10-1.
