= Hyeranyony =

Agrotown in Grodno Region, Belarus

Hyeranyony Геранёны
- Agrotown
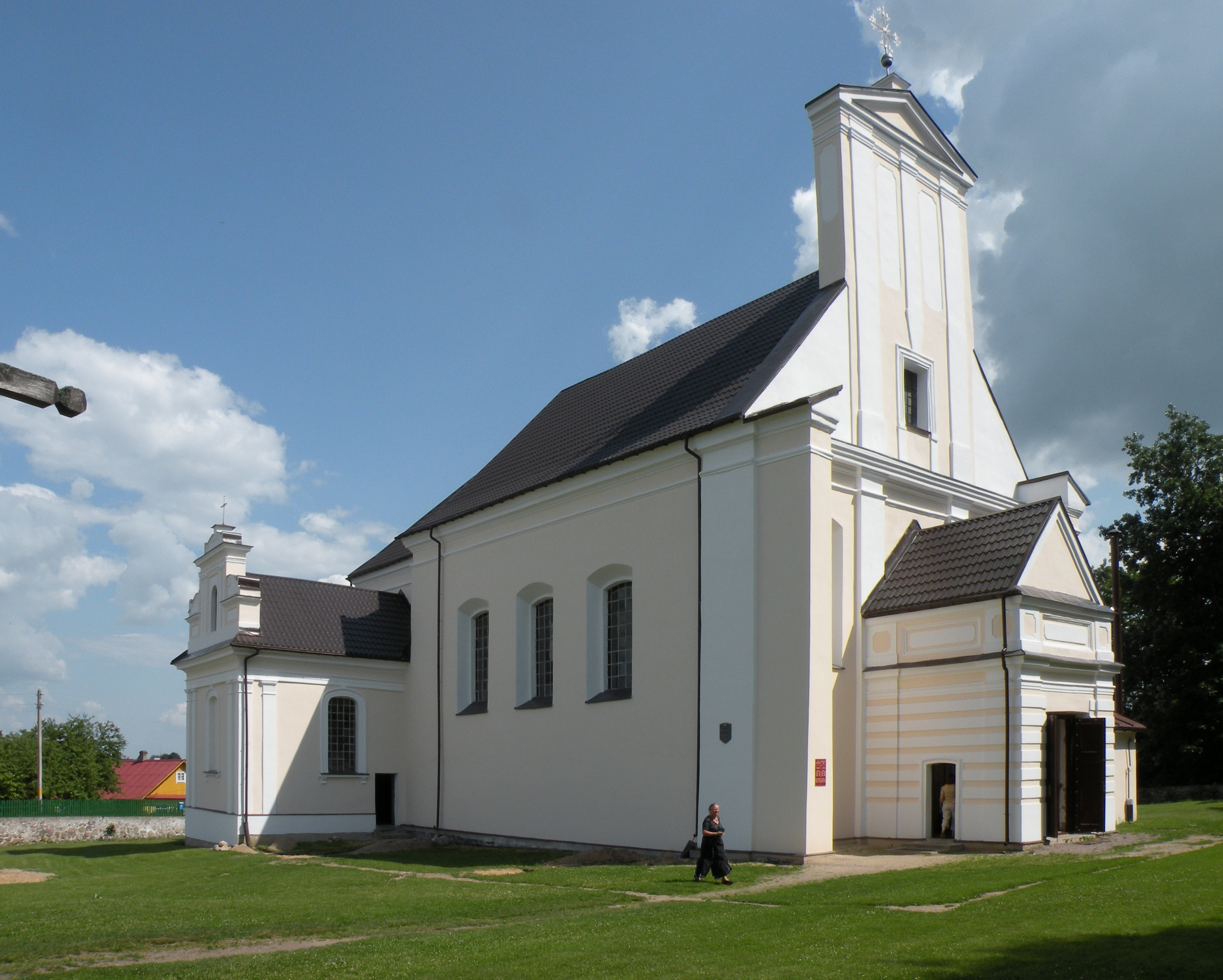

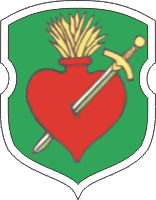
- Coat of arms
- Interactive map of Hyeranyony
- Location within Belarus
- Coordinates: 54°6′53″N 25°35′8″E
- Country: Belarus
- Region: Grodno Region
- District: Iwye District

Population (2010)
  - Total: 1,278
- Time zone: UTC+3 (MSK)

Hyeranyony (Belarusian: Геранёны, romanized: Hieraniony; Russian: Геранёны, romanized: Geranyony; Lithuanian: Geranainys) is an agrotown in Iwye District, Grodno Region, Belarus. It serves as the administrative center of Hyeranyony selsoviet. It is located near the border with Lithuania and is known for the 16th-century Hieraniony Castle built by Albertas Goštautas. The village had a population of 1,278 in 2010.

== History ==
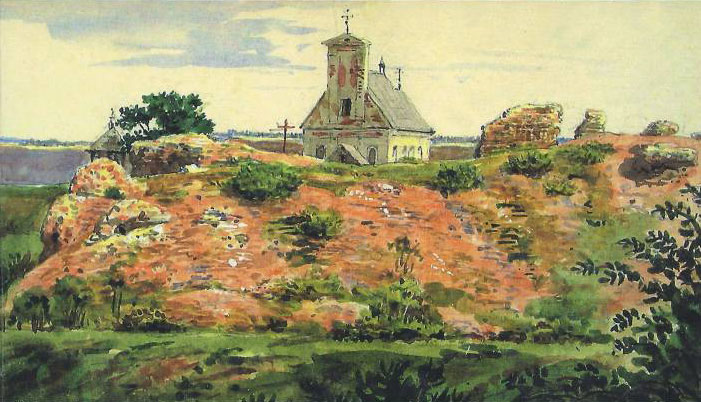
Church of St. Nicholas and ruins of Hieraniony Castle, painting by Kanuty Rusiecki (1846)

In 1433, the settlement was granted by Lithuanian Duke Sigismund Kęstutaitis to Jonas Goštautas. In 1519, Albertas Goštautas built a new church. From 1538 to 1542, future Queen consort of Poland and Grand Duchess consort of Lithuania Barbara Radziwiłł lived in the town. In 1542, it passed to King Sigismund I the Old. Afterwards it was a royal town, administratively located in the Oszmiana County in the Vilnius Voivodeship of the Polish–Lithuanian Commonwealth. Several assemblies of Lithuanian nobility were held in the town during the 1575 interregnum. In 1708, King Stanisław Leszczyński stayed in the town for several days.

Gieranony, as it was known in Polish, was administratively located in the Wołożyn County in the Nowogródek Voivodeship of interwar Poland. According to the 1921 census, the population was 97.5% Polish and 0.6% Belarusian.

Following the joint German-Soviet invasion of Poland, which started World War II in September 1939, the town was first occupied by the Soviet Union until 1941, then by Nazi Germany until 1944, and re-occupied by the Soviet Union afterwards.

== Demographics ==
Historical population
Year	Pop.	±%
1792	306	—
1905	316	+3.3%
1921	277	−12.3%
1970	397	+43.3%
2010	1,278	+221.9%
