= Elizabeth of Austria (1526–1545) =

Queen of Poland from 1543 to 1545

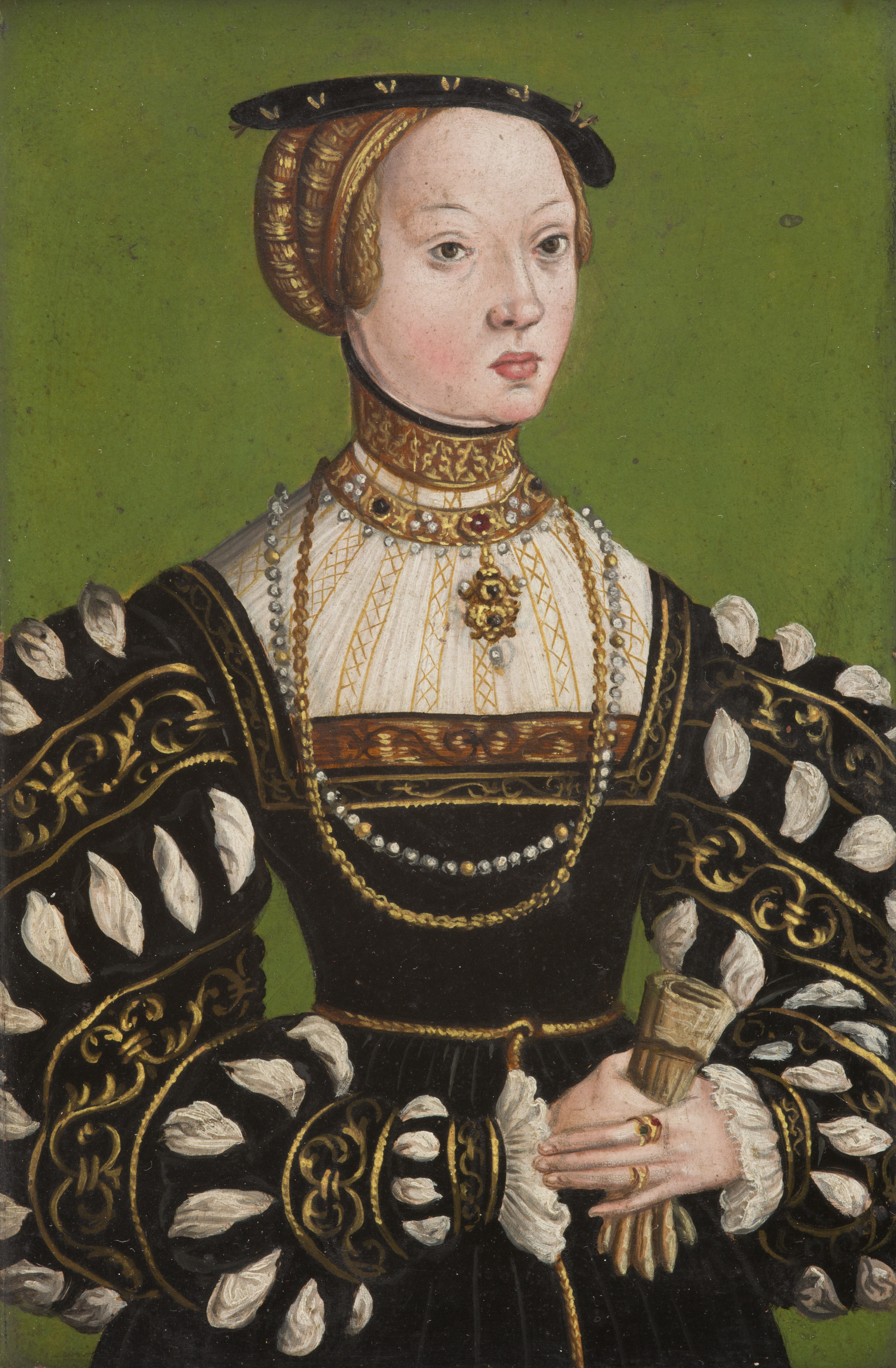
- Portrait by the circle of Lucas Cranach the Younger

Queen consort of Poland Grand Duchess consort of Lithuania
- Tenure: 6 May 1543 – 15 June 1545
- Coronation: 6 May 1543
- Born: 9 July 1526; Linz, Archduchy of Austria, Holy Roman Empire
- Died: 15 June 1545 (aged 18); Vilnius, Grand Duchy of Lithuania
- Burial: 24 July 1545; Vilnius Cathedral
- Spouse: Sigismund II Augustus
- House: House of Habsburg
- Father: Ferdinand I, Holy Roman Emperor
- Mother: Anna of Bohemia and Hungary

Elizabeth of Austria (Polish: Elżbieta Habsburżanka, Lithuanian: Elžbieta Habsburgaitė; 9 July 1526 – 15 June 1545) was Queen of Poland and Grand Duchess of Lithuania by marriage. She was the eldest of fifteen children of Ferdinand I, Holy Roman Emperor, and his wife Anne of Bohemia and Hungary. A member of the House of Habsburg, she was married to Sigismund II Augustus, who was already crowned as King of Poland and Grand Duke of Lithuania even though both of his parents were still alive and well. The marriage was short and unhappy. Elizabeth was of frail health, experiencing epileptic seizures, and died at age 18.

== Life ==
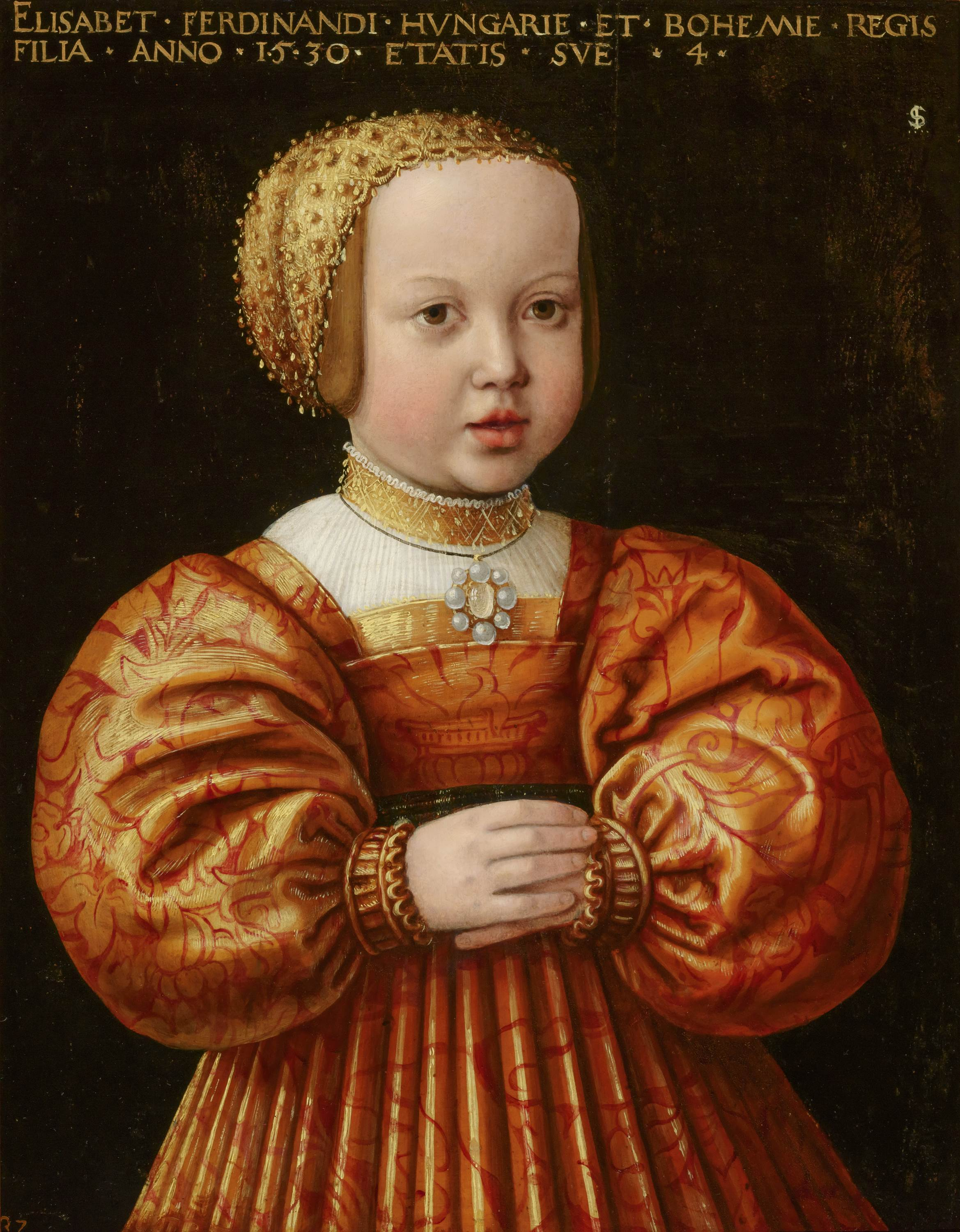
Elizabeth at age four by Jakob Seisenegger

Elizabeth was the first born child of Anna and Ferdinand, the couple had been married for five years before giving birth.

Elizabeth spent most of her childhood in the Hofburg, Innsbruck.

As both of Elizabeth's parents had a love of learning, she and her siblings received a strict and thorough education from the humanist Kaspar Ursinus Velius. Learning German, Italian and French, as well as receiving a Catholic religious education. Both Elizabeth's parents were devout Catholics. Ferdinand, on one occasion threatened to have anyone who exposed his children to Lutheranism executed after he discovered that a tutor of Elizabeth's had Lutheran sympathies and had joked about cardinals. Elizabeth and her sisters were also taught to play keyboard instruments and to dance.

Elizabeth was not taught the Polish language despite her early arranged marriage to Sigismund II Augustus. The marriage plan was first discussed when Elizabeth was only one year old. Louis, King of Hungary and Bohemia, died in August 1526 without leaving an heir. The Hungarian throne was contested between Louis' brother-in-law Ferdinand I and John Zápolya. Louis's uncle Sigismund I the Old and Hungarian nobility supported Zápolya. The marriage of Elizabeth to Sigismund's son was proposed as the means to end Polish support to Zápolya. The Polish Queen and Lithuanian Grand Duchess Bona Sforza opposed the wedding as she opposed the growing influence of the Habsburgs.

In February 1530, ten-year-old Sigismund II Augustus was co-crowned vivente rege as King of Poland and Grand Duke of Lithuania (his father was still alive and in good health) to secure his inheritance in Poland. Envoys of George, Duke of Saxony, attended the coronation ceremony and negotiated the marriage between Elizabeth and Sigismund August on behalf of Ferdinand. Great Chancellor of the Crown Krzysztof Szydłowiecki supported the match and organized a preliminary marriage treaty, signed on 10–11 November 1530 in Poznań. According to the treaty, the marriage was to take place in 1533 when Elizabeth reached the age of seven. Her dowry was 100,000 ducats. In exchange, the Poles would grant her the cities of Nowy Sącz, Sanok, Przemyśl, Biecz as her dower.

Sigismund Augustus and Elizabeth were first cousins once removed. (Casimir IV Jagiellon was a great-grandfather of Elizabeth and a grandfather of Sigismund August). This close relationship required a matrimonial dispensation, which was issued by Pope Clement VII on 24 August 1531. The final marriage treaty, delayed mostly due to the opposition by Bona Sforza, was signed only on 16 June 1538 in Breslau (now Wrocław) by Johannes Dantiscus. The treaty did not differ from the preliminary treaty of 1530 other than the age of the bride which was now set at 16. The betrothal ceremony took place on 17 July 1538 in Innsbruck. Bona continued to lobby against the marriage and instead proposed Princess Margaret of France.

In October the same year, Elizabeth and her younger siblings Maximilian, Ferdinand and Anna traveled with their father to Linz before traveling on to Vienna. This so that they could gain some experience in handling themselves in a formal court environment and also prepare for being confirmed in the Catholic faith. The confirmation took place in October 1539 in the royal chapel, with a Venetian envoy acting as Elizabeth's godfather. The cardinal Girolamo Aleandro, who conducted the ceremony, thought the young archdukes and archduchesses resembled "a chorus of angels".

Elizabeth and her family would return to Innsbruck in 1541.

== Queen of Poland and Grand Duchess of Lithuania ==
Elizabeth and a twelve-person escort departed Vienna on 21 April 1543. She was met at Olomouc by Samuel Maciejowski, Bishop of Płock and a retinue of 1,500 knights. On 5 May 1543, Elizabeth entered Kraków and met Sigismund Augustus for the first time. The next day, 16-year-old Elizabeth married 22-year-old Sigismund Augustus in Wawel Cathedral and was crowned the Queen of Poland. The wedding celebrations continued for two weeks. Bona Sforza was reported to detest her daughter-in-law, who was called "the Young Queen." Bona was now titled "Old Queen".

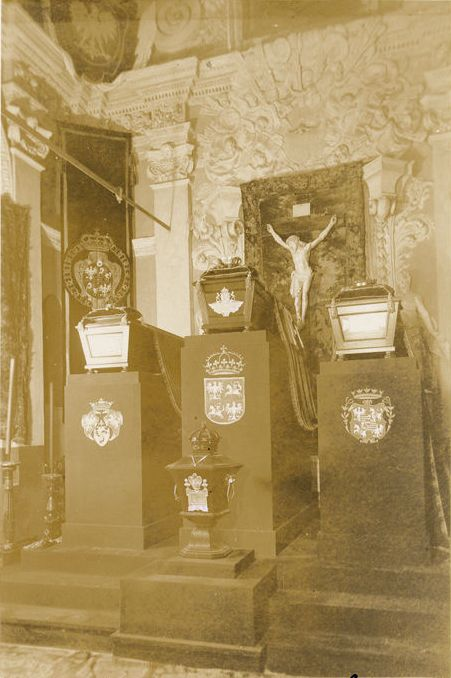
Elizabeth's sarcophagus (on the right) on display in Vilnius Cathedral in 1930s

The marriage was not a happy one. Sigismund Augustus, who already had several mistresses, did not find Elizabeth attractive and continued to have extramarital affairs. Raised in a strict household to be obedient, Elizabeth was too timid and meek to object to this. The long journey from Austria to Poland had further deteriorated her already frail state of health. She was diagnosed with epilepsy and started having seizures. At the same time Bona openly expressed her dislike of Elizabeth and continued to search for ways to destroy the marriage. Bona questioned the wording of the matrimonial dispensation; a new dispensation was issued on 17 May 1544. On the other hand, Polish nobility liked and sympathized with Elizabeth – a young, pleasant woman who was ignored by her husband and taunted by her ambitious mother-in-law. Her father-in-law Sigismund I the Old was also sympathetic to her, but was too weak to protect her from Bona.

Two months after the wedding, plague reached Kraków and the royal family departed the capital city. Sigismund Augustus left for the Grand Duchy of Lithuania, while Sigismund I the Old, Bona, and Elizabeth toured various cities in Poland. After a year of separation, the couple met again in Brest. Sigismund Augustus liked living independently in Lithuania and convinced his father to entrust him with ruling the grand duchy. In fall 1544, Elizabeth and Sigismund Augustus moved to Vilnius. For a few months Sigismund Augustus attempted to keep up appearances of a successful marriage to appease the Habsburgs, but soon started ignoring his wife and continued his affair with Barbara Radziwiłł.

In April 1545, Elizabeth's health deteriorated and she was tormented by her increasingly frequent seizures. On 8 June 1545, Sigismund Augustus went to Kraków to receive Elizabeth's dowry, leaving his wife alone in Vilnius. In Kraków, Sigismund Augustus inquired about treatments and asked Ferdinand I to send his own doctors. But it was too late. On 15 June, the young queen-grand duchess died exhausted by her many epileptic seizures. She was buried on 24 July 1545 (after her husband returned from Kraków) in Vilnius Cathedral next to her husband's uncle, King Alexander Jagiellon.

After Elizabeth's death Sigismund Augustus married his mistress Barbara Radziwiłł and, after her death, Elizabeth's younger sister, Catherine of Austria. Sigismund had no living children with any of his three wives.

== Ancestors ==
8. Maximilian I, Holy Roman Emperor
4. Philip I of Castile
9. Mary, Duchess of Burgundy
2. Ferdinand I, Holy Roman Emperor
10. Ferdinand II of Aragon
5. Joanna I of Castile
11. Isabella I of Castile
1. Elizabeth of Austria
12. Casimir IV Jagiellon
6. Vladislaus II of Bohemia and Hungary
13. Elisabeth of Austria
3. Anne of Bohemia and Hungary
14. Gaston de Foix, Count of Candale
7. Anne of Foix-Candale
15. Catherine of Foix

Elizabeth of Austria House of Habsburg Born: 9 July 1526 Died: 15 June 1545
Royal titles
Preceded by Bona Sforza as sole queen	Queen consort of Poland; Grand Duchess consort of Lithuania; 1543–1545 with Bona Sforza	Succeeded by Bona Sforza as sole queen
