= Biglia =

Biglia is a surname. Notable people with the surname include:

- Andrea Biglia (1395–1435), Italian Augustinian humanist
- Francesco Biglia (1587–1659), Italian Roman Catholic bishop
- Giovanni Battista Biglia (1570–1617), Italian Roman Catholic bishop
- Lucas Biglia (born 1986), Argentine footballer
- Cesare Biglia (1928–2001), Italian politician and lawyer
