= Kolanka Venkata Raju =

Kolanka Venkata Raju is a Mridangam exponent and recipient of Sangeet Natak Akademi Award for 1979. He has received a Certificat of Merit from The Music Academy, Chennai. He is associated with violin player Dwaram Venkataswamy Naidu for a long-time.
