= Vidmantas Bačiulis =

Lithuanian film director (1940–2022)

Vidmantas Bačiulis (12 March 1940 to 16 October 2022) was a Lithuanian screenwriter, film, and television film director.

== Credits ==
=== Feature films and TV plays ===
He was director of TV renderings of a number of classic Lithuanian works of literature.

=== Music films ===
- Dienos, metai – visas gyvenimas, creative portrait of Virgilijus Noreika
- Kūrybos aukštumos, creative portrait of Saulius Sondeckis
- Akimirksni žavus, creative portrait of Edvardas Kaniava

=== Documentaries ===
- 1972: Rugsėjo 1-oji
- 1972: Ecce Homo
- 1974: Prie baltų aukštųjų bokštų
- 1997: Čigoniška laimė
- 1998: Ateinantys
- 1998: Elena keliauja į Lietuvą
- 1999: Sveikas, pone Andre
- 2000: Kelionė
- 2001: Tėvas ir sūnus
- 2003: Gyvybės vardan
- 2005: Pasivaikščiojimas po Europos parką
