= Mikołaj Radziwiłł the Red =

Lithuanian nobleman (1512–1584)

- Count Palatine of Vilnius; Grand Chancellor of Lithuania; Grand Hetman of Lithuania
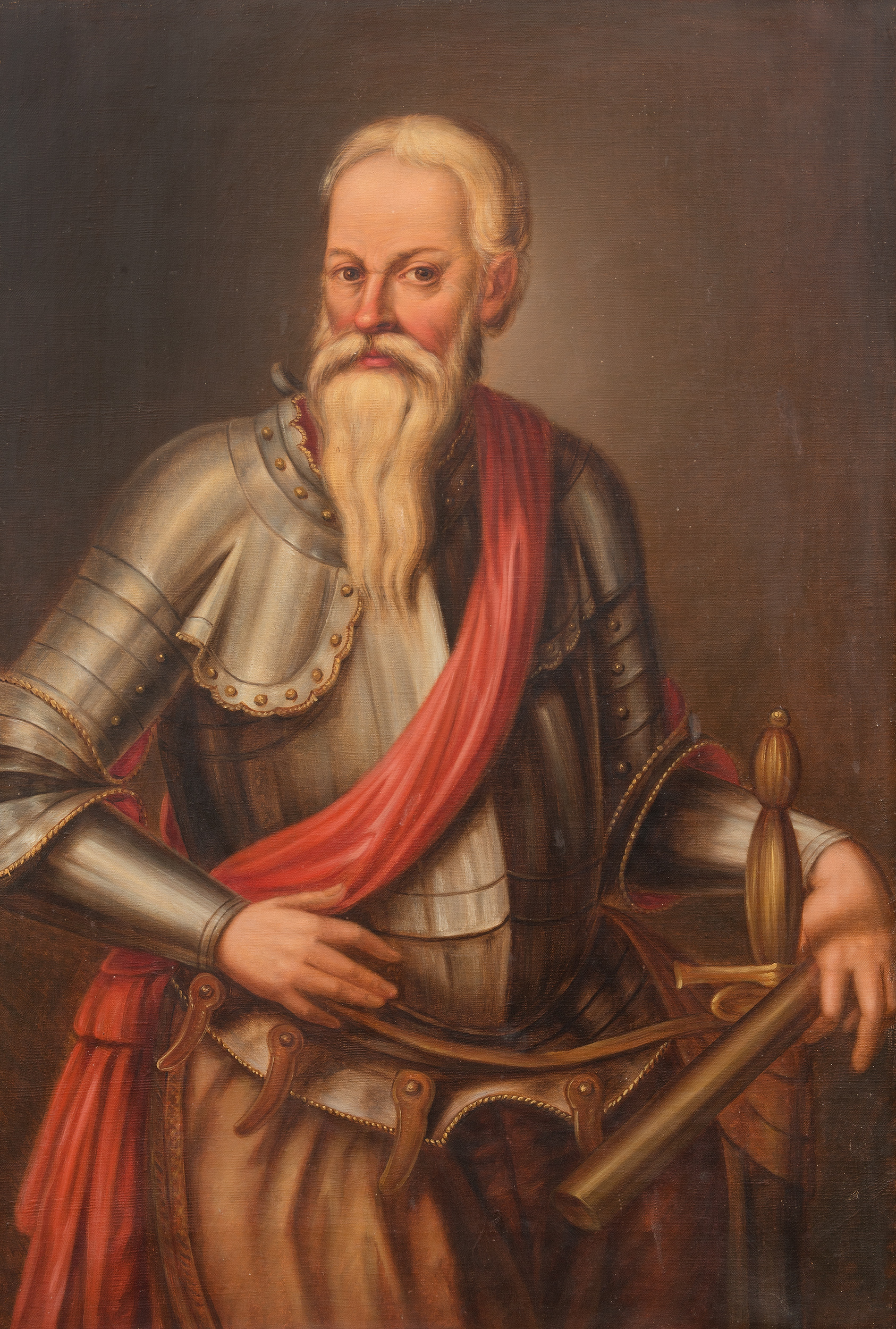
- 19th-century portrait
- Born: 1512; Nyasvizh, Grand Duchy of Lithuania
- Died: 28 April 1584 (aged 71–72); Vilnius, Grand Duchy of Lithuania
- Buried: Dubingiai, Lithuania
- Noble family: Radziwiłł
- Spouse: Katarzyna Tomicka
- Issue: with Katarzyna Tomicka-Iwińska: Mikołaj VII Radziwiłł; Krzysztof "Piorun" Radziwiłł
- Father: Jerzy Radziwiłł
- Mother: Barbara Kolanka

Mikołaj Radziwiłł the Red (Polish Rudy, Lithuanian: Radvila Rudasis; 1512 – 28 April 1584), was a Polish–Lithuanian nobleman who served as the voivode of Vilnius, Grand Chancellor of Lithuania (since 1566), and Grand Lithuanian Hetman (1553–1566 and since 1576) in the Grand Duchy of Lithuania and later the Polish–Lithuanian Commonwealth. Together with his cousin Mikołaj Radziwiłł the Black and the Radziwiłł family, they were granted title and position as Prince of the Holy Roman Empire.

== Life ==
A princely variant of the family coat of arms of Trąby (called Radziwiłł II) granted to Mikołaj Radziwiłł in 1547 by the Roman Emperor

His father was Jerzy Radzwiłł, called "Victor", a Lithuanian hetman. His mother was Barbara Kolanka, daughter of voivode of Podolia Paweł Kola, a representative of a wealthy Małopolska family. His sisters were Anna and Barbara, later the wife of Polish King Sigismund Augustus.

Mikołaj Radziwiłł the Red received, not the best, home education. His first language was Polish, which he used on a daily basis. He also knew Ruthenian, the official language in the Grand Duchy of Lithuania. He read and wrote in both Polish and Ruthenian, although his handwritten letters are written in illegible and careless handwriting, indicating the magnate's low level of calligraphy. He did not know Latin, or knew it at a completely rudimentary level. The education was supplemented by service at the royal court in Kraków. Radziwiłł himself did not value university education highly, and did not send his sons to university, limiting their training to home education.

In 1532, Mikołaj was betrothed to the daughter of Grand Crown Chancellor Krzysztof Szydłowiecki, Anna. The marriage never occurred, as the bride died in 1536 before reaching marriageable age. Mikołaj's first participation in public life was in the Lithuanian-Moscow War of 1534 at his father's side.

Mikołaj Radziwiłł spent many years as a military commander. One of his most notable victories was achieved at the head of the Grand Ducal Lithuanian Army during the Battle of Ula of 1564, when his forces defeated Ivan the Terrible's much larger forces. Under King Stephen Báthory, he was fairly successful in defending the eastern borders of the Grand Duchy of Lithuania against the Muscovy.

His political career was marked by his alliance with his cousin Mikołaj Radziwiłł the Black, with whom he opposed the other notable Lithuanian families in the rivalry for the dominant status in the Great Duchy. The alliance marked the formation of a dynastic-like cooperation between Radziwiłłs and showed how family interests could affect magnates' relations with the Commonwealth.

Mikołaj Radziwiłł became an advocate of Lithuanian sovereignty and thus a vocal opponent of the political Polish–Lithuanian union at Lublin in 1569. Unlike the other magnates, he refused to sign the Act as harmful to the interests of the Grand Duchy of Lithuania.

He was one of the most prominent converts and advocates of Protestantism in the Polish–Lithuanian Commonwealth and his line of the family became devoted members and defenders of the Lithuanian Evangelical Reformed Church until its extinction.

== Legacy ==
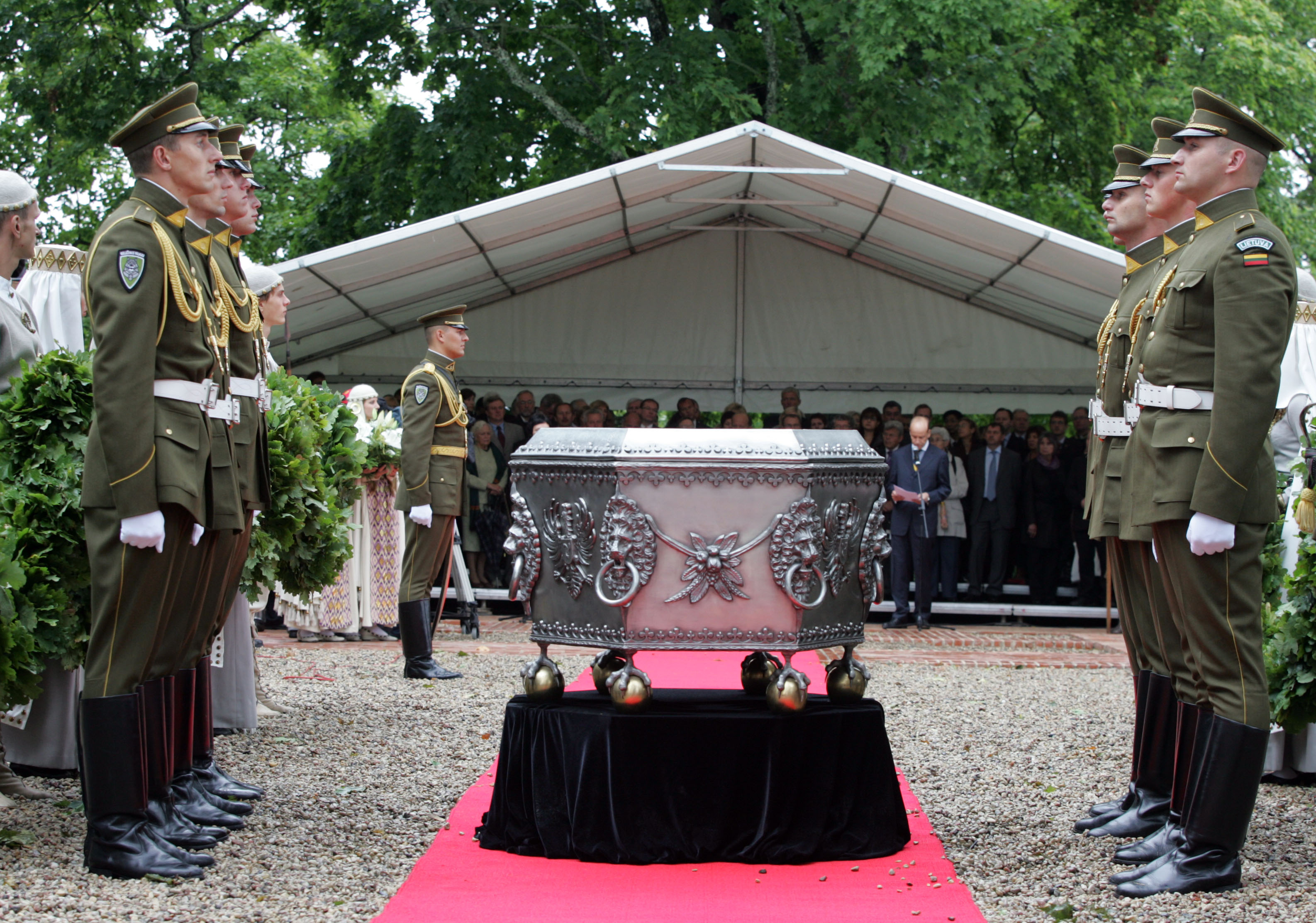
Reburial ceremony of Radziwiłł the Red, among others, in Dubingiai, Lithuania

He was immortalised in the epic poem Radivilias (1592).

In the early 21st century Mikołaj Radziwiłł the Red's remains and his cousin Mikołaj Radziwiłł the Black's remains were discovered in the cellar of a demolished Evangelical Reformed Church of the Dubingiai Castle and in 2009 they were reburied during a formal ceremony in the Radziwiłł Pantheon of the Dubingiai Castle.

== General and cited references ==
- Ferenc, Mikołaj (2008). Mikołaj Radziwiłł Rudy (ok. 1515-1584). Działalność polityczna i wojskowa [Mikołaj Radziwiłł Rudy (c. 1515–1584). Political and military work] (PDF) (in Polish). Kraków: Uniwersytet Jagielloński. ISBN 978-83-88737-94-7.
- Frost, Robert (2015). The Oxford History of Poland–Lithuania. Vol. I: The Making of the Polish–Lithuanian Union, 1385–1569. Oxford University Press. ISBN 978-0198208693.
