= Lithuanian nobility =

Legally privileged class in the Grand Duchy of Lithuania

Columns of Gediminas, symbol of the House of Gediminas

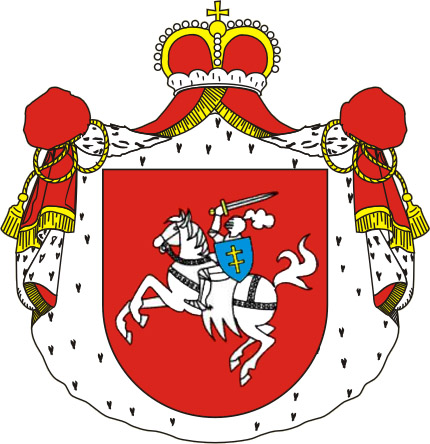
Medieval Coat of Arms of Lithuania was inherited by oldest families

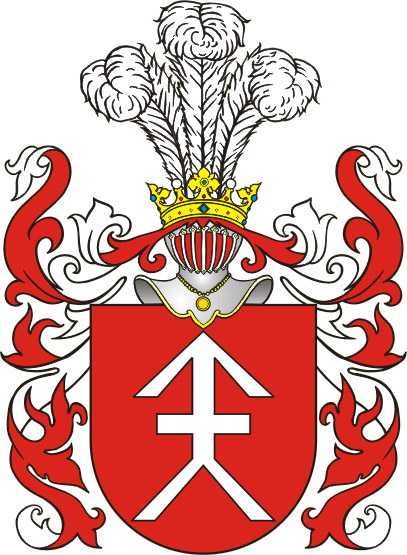
Crossed arrows motive indicates the oldest type of heraldry in Lithuania after formal Christianization, like Kościesza coat of arms

The Lithuanian nobility (Lithuanian: bajorija) or szlachta of the Grand Duchy of Lithuania (Lithuanian: Lietuvos Didžiosios Kunigaikštystės šlėkta, Polish: szlachta Wielkiego Księstwa Litewskiego) was historically a legally privileged hereditary elite class in the Grand Duchy of Lithuania and Polish Lithuanian Commonwealth (including during period of foreign rule 1795–1918) consisting of Lithuanians from Lithuania Proper; Samogitians from Duchy of Samogitia; following Lithuania's eastward expansion into what is now Belarus, Ukraine and Russia, many ethnically Ruthenian noble families (boyars); and, later on, predominantly Baltic German families from the Duchy of Livonia and Inflanty Voivodeship.

Initially, the privileged social group of the Grand Duchy of Lithuania was called boyars. Boyars became part of the szlachta (nobility) during the Union of Horodło on October 2, 1413, initiating nobility in the Grand Duchy of Lithuania following the Western European model (with a hereditary system of heraldic identification), as well as an increase in the position of the Greater Lithuanian nobility. The Grand Duchy of Lithuania adopted Polish institutions of castellans and voivodes, and 47 selected boyars of Grand Duchy of Lithuania of the Catholic faith were adopted by Polish noble families and received Polish coats of arms.

Families of the nobility were responsible for military mobilization and enjoyed Golden Liberty; some were rewarded with additional privileges for success on the battlefield. In the Grand Duchy of Lithuania, ducal titles were mostly inherited by descendants of old dynasties while the relatively few hereditary noble titles in the Kingdom of Poland were bestowed by foreign monarchs. The Polish–Lithuanian Commonwealth had one of the largest percentages of nobility in Europe, with szlachta (nobility) constituting close to 10% of the population, but in some constituent regions, like the Duchy of Samogitia, it was closer to 12%. However, the high nobility was extremely limited in number, consisting of the magnates and later, within the Russian Empire, of princes.

Over time, the vast majority of the nobility of the Grand Duchy of Lithuania voluntarily became Polonized and recognized Polish national thought as a natural continuation of Greater Lithuanian national thought.

== Cultural affiliation ==
According to the Polish historian Grzegorz Błaszczyk, Lithuanian nobility doesn’t mean the same as the leaders of today's Lithuania, as the terms "Lithuanians" and "Lithuanian" have changed over the centuries. According to the Lithuanian historian Vytautas Spečiūnas, the Grand Duchy of Lithuania was formed on the basis of Lithuania proper, which is a part of the Eastern Balts ethnic territory. According to the Polish historian Jerzy Ochmański, already during the times of the Grand Duchy of Lithuania, Lithuania proper was a term designated to land where Lithuanians live. The Lithuanian Grand Duke Vytautas in his 11 March 1420 letter sent to Sigismund, Holy Roman Emperor, wrote about Samogitia that "it is and has always been the same Lithuanian land, because there is one language and the same inhabitants. The people of Samogitia have long called themselves as Lithuanians and never as Samogitians, and because of such identity (sic) we do not write about Samogitia in our letter, because everything is one: one country and the same inhabitants" (see also: Samogitian dialect, Lithuanian language).

As cultural homogenization and linguistic Polonization of the nobility progressed, the concept of Lithuanian began to mean simply regional difference within the uniform political nation of the Polish-Lithuanian Commonwealth. The main Polonizing factors, as in other areas of the First Republic of Poland, were the church, the manor and the city, where the lower social classes adopted and thereby took over the cultural patterns of the higher classes.

Already in 1576, seven years after the conclusion of the Union of Lublin, Augustyn Rotundus, a historiographer of Greater Lithuania at that time, wrote that the Lithuanian language previously used by some citizens of Grand Duchy of Lithuania was used by peasants, while the nobility widely adopted Polish. However, this process took place without orders or prohibitions, without coercion, mainly under the influence of civilizational domination and administrative influence (there is also no evidence of administrative coercion). On the other hand, Mikalojus Daukša in his 1599 Postil wrote that "Although, to be honest, there are few of us, especially the more noble ones, who do not know Polish and cannot read sermons written in Polish, in my opinion, there are mostly those who do not understand Polish or have only a poor knowledge of it."

Polonization processes led to the fact that already in the 17th century, Lithuanian landowners called themselves gente Lithuani, natione Poloni (Latin: Lithuanians by birth, Poles by nationality). In 1697, in the entire Grand Duchy of Lithuania, at the request of the local Lithuanian nobility, Polish was introduced as the official language instead of the previously existing Ruthenian language.

In the 18th century, the Polonization of the lands within the borders of the Polish-Lithuanian Commonwealth was a completed process, and the Polonization of Vilnius was a state of affairs. Despite the lack of their own state, the conviction of the permanent nature of Lithuania's relationship with Poles and the territorial integrity of their common, although enslaved, homeland was strengthening in the minds of all Poles. In the lands of the former Polish-Lithuanian Commonwealth, the cultural unity of inhabitants was strengthening, and many traditionally understood Lithuanians discovered a modern national identity - they became Poles. However, that the described processes took place almost exclusively within the nobility and landed gentry and among the intelligentsia.

The fall of the Polish–Lithuanian Commonwealth and unsuccessful armed uprisings led to the strengthening of the Polonization processes of the small nobility of the Grand Duchy of Lithuania, identifying spiritually and culturally with Polish traditions. Post-uprising repression resulted in the Catholic Church becoming the mainstay of Polishness. Because the Catholic Church had a Polish character, it became an element integrating both the conscious classes and the popular masses, who began to identify with Polishness through their religion.

The January Uprising of 1863-1864 and the wave of post-uprising repressions were a great shock for the people of the former Grand Duchy of Lithuania. However, under the influence of painful experiences, the sense of community between Lithuanianness and Polishness became even stronger, and the belief in the identity of both elements became almost a patriotic axiom. Additionally, in the second half of the 19th century and at the beginning of the 20th century, the process of linguistic Polonization of the rural population accelerated rapidly, especially in the Vilnius region.

In the consciousness of the general Polish society at that time, the multi-ethnic heritage of the Polish-Lithuanian Commonwealth was increasingly identified simply with Polish heritage. Such views were held by the most active and opinion-forming layer of the emerging nation. The intelligentsia grew up in an atmosphere of supremacy of nobility culture, so they easily identified with it. It adopted the nobility's way of perceiving the world, even if it came from other social groups. According to a commonly accepted interpretation, the history of the "peoples" inhabiting the eastern lands of the former Polish-Lithuanian Commonwealth constituted an integral part of the history of Poles. The local "peoples" (especially Lithuanians and Belarusians) were perceived at best as "younger brothers", naturally subordinated to the Polish national interest. It was therefore necessary to educate them and guide them in the right direction, because they were not yet mature enough to make independent decisions. "Our Polish paternalism - writes Roman Wapiński - is firmly located in the East.

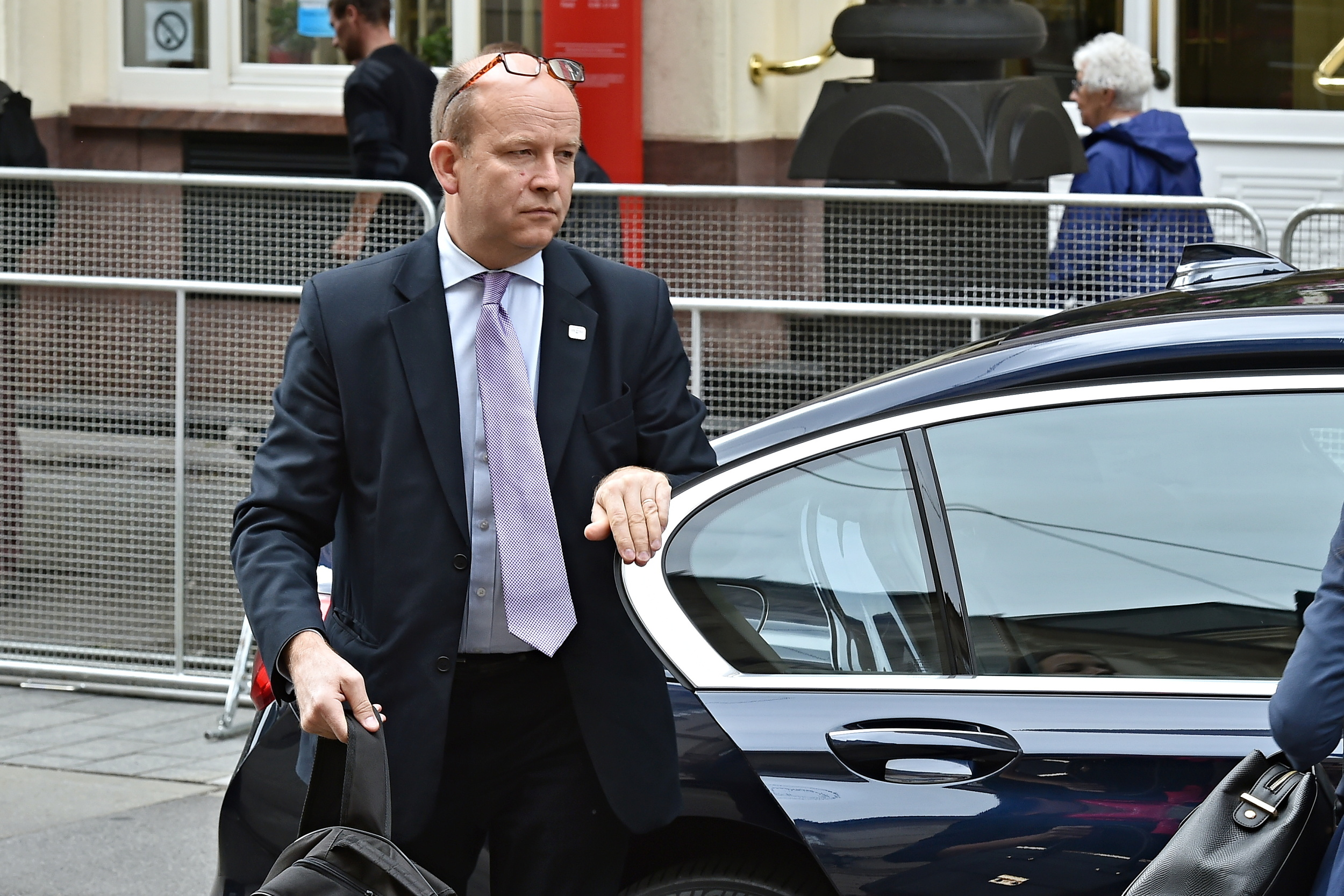
Konstanty Radziwiłł, representative of the House of Radziwiłł

In the Second Polish Republic, Lithuanians lived mainly in the counties on the border with Lithuania: Święciany, Vilnius-Trakai and Suwałki, and almost all of them were rural people engaged in agriculture. At the beginning of the 20th century, descendants of former noble Lithuanians were most likely to call themselves Poles. Only a part of the nobility, openly referring to the traditions of historical Lithuania, trying to reconcile Lithuanianness with Polishness, called themselves "old Lithuanians", "historical Lithuanians" or "The Mickiewicz's" (i.e. - such as in Adam Mickiewicz, from the first words of the invocation from the poem Pan Tadeusz: "O Lithuania, my country ... " ). In turn, the representatives of the former "Semigalian people", now "nationalized", called themselves Lithuanians, additionally reserving the exclusive right to this term. However, attempts were made to create organizations of native Lithuanians of noble descent. On April 4, 1928, the Lithuanian Boyars Society (Lithuanian: Lietuvos bajorų draugija) was established, which operated until 1940.

Upon adoption of the Act of the Re-Establishment of the State of Lithuania in 1990 and this way ending the Soviet occupation of Lithuania, the Royal Union of the Lithuanian Boyars (Lithuanian: Lietuvos bajorų karališkoji sąjunga) was established in Vilnius in 1994 which continues the interwar period Society traditions, perform legitimation processes of historical Lithuanian nobles, organize ceremonies of awarding acts of recognition of nobility and unites thousands of Lithuanian nobles. However, the criteria for belonging to the nobility of this organization are treated liberally, accepting members who can prove their descent only through the female line. Therefore, the Royal Union of the Lithuanian Boyars has no chance of acceptance by international associations.

According to Professor Grzegorz Błaszczyk, the heritage of the Grand Duchy of Lithuania belongs primarily to the descendants of old Greater Lithuanian families, most of whom were Polonized and still live in Poland today. The last representative of the great Lithuanian families living in today's Lithuania, Stefania Maria Romer, died in 2012. Meanwhile, in Poland, about 2,000 Polish families with Lithuanian origins live and use the Polish language, including the Radziwiłł, Czartoryski, Tyszkiewicz, Sanguszko, Sapieha, Giedroyć, Piłsudski, Puzyna, Woroniecki and Romer families.

The president of the Genealogical and Heraldic Society of Lithuania, Czesław Malewski, commented that currently there are no famous families left in Lithuania, and the functioning and competing associations of the Lithuanian nobility gather in their ranks representatives of the minor nobility, most often descending from their families on the distaff side.

== History ==
=== Lithuania before formal Christianization ===
Prior to the baptism by Mindaugas, lesser members of the nobility were called bajorai (singular - bajoras) and greater nobles, kunigai (singular - kunigas), related to the Old German: kunig, meaning "king", or Lithuanian: kunigaikštis, usually translated as duke, Latin: dux. These positions evolved from tribal leaders and were chiefly responsible for waging wars and organizing raids operations into enemy territories. Following the establishment of a unified state, they gradually became subordinates to greater Dukes, and later to the King of Lithuania. After Mindaugas' death, all Lithuanian rulers held the title Grand Duke (Lithuanian: Didysis kunigaikštis), or king, which was the title sometimes used by Gediminas and several others.

Ethnic Lithuanian nobility had different names than common people, as their names consisted of two stems. Greater noble families generally used their predecessor's Lithuanian pagan given names as their family names; this was the case with Goštautai, Radvilos, Astikai, Kęsgailos and others. Those families acquired great wealth, eventually becoming magnates. Their representatives are respectively Jonas Goštautas, Radvila Astikas, Kristinas Astikas and Mykolas Kęsgaila. The aforementioned families were granted corresponding Polish coats of arms under the Union of Horodlo in 1413.

While at the beginning the nobility was almost all Lithuanian or Samogitian, with territorial expansion more Ruthenian families joined the nobility. As early as the 16th century, several Ruthenian noble families began to call themselves gente Ruthenus, natione Lithuanus. A good example is the Chodkiewicz family, which attributed its ancestry to the House of Gediminas.

=== Grand Duchy of Lithuania before the Union of Lublin (1386-1569) ===
==== Formation of the noble estate ====
The term boyar, boiarstvo (bajorai) originally denoted all those who fought. Over the course of the 15th century, it changed its meaning to refer to the masses of ordinary nobility who could stand up to fight when called upon. There were also social groups that were personally free but had no military commitments. Such a group were, for example, putnie boyars, who served as grand-ducal envoys and were in charge of road maintenance. A significant group of boyars were service boyars who did not own allodial land, but only service estates, which they received and owned only by the grace of the Grand Duke. As the role and wealth of the great magnates increased, the service boyars put themselves at the service of the lords and princes in exchange for tenures.

The process of the formation of the noble estate in Lithuania accelerated after the union with Poland when there arose a desire to equalize the legal system of both countries. Nobility, or szlachta, in Poland was already a well-established estate, its legal position was consolidated in the 14th century. At this point, it was basically impossible to enter the noble status otherwise than by birth. The development of the idea of corona regni aroused among the nobility a notion of being the main unifying force of the kingdom and responsible for its rule. Lithuanian nobles aspired to this position. Privileges of 1387 and 1413 gave legal security of tenure to holders of allodial land and recognized in law the rights of landowners to pass on their estates. Although allodial land ownership was previously known in the Grand Duchy, its prevalence increased significantly in the following period. Similarly, the new law of inheritance led to a decline in the importance, outside Kaunas district and Samogitia, of clan kinships, in favour of more nuclear families.

This led to a rapid change in the structure of land ownership. While in 1386 80% of the population lived in the lands directly under the Grand Duke's rule, by 1528 this figure had fallen to 30%. It is estimated that 5% of the land was owned by the Church, while as much as 65% of the land was then in the hands of 13 thousand of noble families (6 thousand of them were of Lithuanian origin). Most of it was owned by a small group of several dozen families of lords, which constituted the political elite of the country.

New terms emerged for all those of noble birth: shliakhta (from Polish: szlachta; Lithuanian: šlėkta) in Ruthenian and nobiles in Latin. The term zemianin (Lithuanian: ziemionys) began to denote the nobles who possessed land. Szlachta itself was stratified into several categories.

As the privileges and political importance of the nobility grew and the burdens and freedoms of the peasantry were reduced, these linguistic differences began to gain importance. Around the beginning of the 16th century, groups of boyars spared no effort to prove their noble status. The grand ducal council resolved that nobility had to be attested by the testimony of two neighbours, of undoubtedly noble lineage, saying that the applicant's family had been "boyars and shliakhta through the ages". Another opportunity to prove nobility were the military musterings, the first one organised in 1528, where a register of those capable to fight was prepared. A listing in such a register was legal proof of nobility.

==== Emergence of a magnate elite ====
Initially, a group distinguished by prestige were the princely families, which members bore the title of knyaz. These were mostly, at least according to tradition, the descendants of the dynasties who accepted the authority of Gediminids. However, only those who owned land in Lithuania proper, who were of Lithuanian origin and who had accepted Catholicism in 1386, had any influence on central state policy. The Ruthenian princes had influence only on the local situation in their lands. They varied considerably in terms of wealth and importance, some of them wielding huge estates, while others possessed their land on service tenure from the grand duke or another prince (so-called 'service princes' - князя слчжбовiе). The most powerful princes retained almost total power in their lands, recognising the supremacy of the grand dukes. Vytautas began a policy of limiting the power of the princes and incorporating their appanages into the domain. Many princes died in civil wars after his death. Many appanages, lying in the east, were lost to Moscow in the course of wars in the 15th and 16th centuries. Some families became extinct, and with the restriction of the circle of inheritance, their estates were incorporated into the grand-ducal domain. In 1499 Alexander regulated the legal system of the few remaining appanages, the magnates ruling them were given the full ius ducale. This was of little political significance since the princes as a political class were of little importance.

Regarding Lithuania proper, not counting descendants of Gediminas seven princely families are known: Borowski, Dowgowd, Giedraitis/Giedrojć, Jamontowicz, Holshansky, Sudemund, Świrski. They also used the title knyaz, which is probably a rendering of the Lithuanian kunigas, which in pagan times probably belonged to every person of noble status. It is not clear whether they owed their princely dignity to their former status as sovereigns or to their connection and affinity with the ruling family established in the 14th century (this is confirmed at least for the Gedraitis and Holshanskys).

Among them, only the Holshansky played a significant role on the side of the grand dukes, starting from Jogaila and Vytautas, being in the strict power elite. Apart from them, these were the families descended from Gediminas family: Olelkovich, Belsky, Kobryński and Zasławski. The princes of ethnically Ruthenian origin were excluded from the strict power elite and found their place in it only at the end of the 15th century. Then the representatives of powerful Volhynian families: Sanguszko, Czartoryski, Ostrogski and Zasławski found their place in the power elite.

Since the reign of Vytautas, documents began to distinguish a group of great lords, calling them in Latin baro (pl. barones), dominus (pl. domini) or, in Ruthenian texts, "great boyars" (боярe великie). Soon, the borrowed from Polish term "pan" (plural "pany", пан; ponai or didikai), literally meaning "lord" gained popularity. This new elite was only partly descended from the old princely families that ruled Lithuania in pagan times. To a large extent, these were new families that appeared during the reigns of Jogaila and Vytautas and whose representatives were among the signatories of the Union of Horodło (1413). They owed their position to the generosity of the grand dukes, who rewarded them with offices and land granted in allodium.

In the Union of Horodło (1413) forty-five Polish families adopted forty-seven Lithuanian Catholic families, lending them their coats of arms. It is assumed that the representatives of Lithuanian nobility gathered in Horodło constituted the elite of that time on which Vytautas based his authority. The adoption of Polish coats of arms, an important marker of nobility with a well-established tradition in Western Europe, elevated this narrow group above other privileged population groups. Despite the fact that some of them abandoned the Horodło coats of arms and replaced them with others, the political significance of this gesture did not lose its significance. In the system built by Vytautas, central offices were restricted to Catholics only, which excluded nobles of Ruthenian origin. The basis of the Grand Duke's power was the lands of Lithuania proper, basically the provinces of Trakai and Vilnius. Nobles from this region constituted the ruling elite. The situation began to change in the 1430s when nobility privileges began to be extended to the Ruthenian nobility.

The cementing of the new elite was strengthened by the emergence of the institution of the council. Initially, it had no institutionalized form but gathered the ruler's closest associates. However, from 1430 onwards, it began to take shape as a permanent institution, to which one automatically became a member by virtue of holding the relevant office. Possession of the princely title gave the right to participate in wider councils, called Sejm (сеймь, сoймь) a term borrowed from Polish. Their position grew especially during the period when the Grand Duke was also King of Poland and was away from the country for long periods. Crucial to this was the privilege of 1492, which gave the council enormous influence over the politics of the Grand Duchy. Practically giving it full control over the actions of the ruler. While in Poland at that time the limitation of royal power was associated with an increase in the role of the ordinary nobility, in the Grand Duchy, where nobility assemblies (sejmiks) did not exist, full power passed into the hands of the great lords. Grand Duchy of Lithuania offices were held almost exclusively by magnates.

Potent Radziwiłł family (Radvila) received the title of the prince (German: Reichsfürst; Polish: książę) from the Holy Roman Emperor in 1518, similarly some other families received titles of counts (Goštautai/Gasztołd in 1529/30; Ilinicz in 1553; Chodkiewicz in 1568; possibly Kęsgailos/Kieżgajło in 1547) from the Emperor. The elevation of the Radziwiłł family resulted in the abandonment of the title of "knyaz" by those Ruthenian families that still retained significant power, wealth and often appanages (for example Wiśniowiecki, Ostrogski, Zbaraski). They adopted instead the Polish title "książę", which in Ruthenian texts was translated as "knyazhe". As a result, the poorer prince families that still used the title of knyaz fell completely into insignificance, and the Lithuanian magnate elite consisted of "princes and lords" (Polish: "książąt i panów").

==== Privileges ====
Following his distribution of state land, the Grand Duke became dependent on powerful landowners, who began demanding greater liberties and privileges. The nobles were granted administrative and judicial power in their domains and increasing rights in state politics. The legal status of the nobility was based on several privileges, granted by the Grand Dukes:

- In 1387 the Grand Duke of Lithuania, Jogaila, newly crowned King of Poland, granted a privilege to nobles and soldiers. They received personal rights, including the right to inherit and govern land as well as estates inherited from ancestors or gifted by the Grand Duke. At the same time, the nobles had duties to serve in the military, build, maintain and safeguard castles, bridges, roads and other vicinities.
- In 1413 Vytautas and Jogaila signed Union of Horodło. The act served to renew Polish–Lithuanian union and establish a common Sejm, guaranteeing the right to inherit lands gifted by the Grand Duke. Forty-three Lithuanian noble families were granted Polish coats of arms. Most of the veldamai became serfs.
- Jogaila's privilege in 1432 in essence repeated previous acts. Military service remained the primary means to receive land.
- Privilege of May 6, 1434 was granted by Sigismund Kestutaitis to Catholic and Eastern Orthodox nobility. They were guaranteed freedom to dispose of their land. Significantly, the act also prohibited persecution without a fair trial.
- In 1447 Casimir I Jagiellon limited positions within the Catholic Church or state institutions only to people from Lithuania. Certain nobles were released from their duties to the Grand Duke. This privilege also marked the beginnings of serfdom in Lithuania, as peasants were removed from the Grand Duke's jurisdiction.
- 1492 privilege by Alexander Jagiellon renewed the 1447 privilege and added a few more provisions, the most important of which limited the Grand Duke's rights in regards to foreign policy. The Grand Duke became dependent on the Lithuanian Council of Lords. Without the consent of the Council no high official could be removed from his position. Lower posts had to be appointed in the presence of voivodes of Vilnius, Trakai, and other voivodeships. The privilege also prohibited selling various state and church positions to nobility. In turn, the Grand Duke was limited from exploiting conflicts between higher and lower nobility and profiting by selling the positions. This privilege also signified that city residents could not become officials.
- In 1506 Sigismund I the Old confirmed the position of the Council of Lords in state politics and limited acquisition of positions within the noble class.
- On April 1, 1557, Sigismund II Augustus initiated the Wallach reform, which completed the establishment of serfdom. The implementation of serfdom deprived the peasants of land ownership as well as personal rights, making the serfs completely dependent on nobles.
- Union of Lublin in 1569 created the new state, the Polish–Lithuanian Commonwealth. The nobility was granted the right to elect a common ruler for Poland and Lithuania.
- The Third Statute of Lithuania, completed in 1588, further expanded the rights of nobility. Laws could be enacted only by the general sejm. The nobility was granted triple immunity: legal, administrative and tax exemption. The statute finalized the division between nobility, peasants, and city residents.

Most of the nobility rights were retained even after the third partition of the Polish–Lithuanian Commonwealth in 1795.

==== After the Union of Lublin ====
The nobility was particularly numerous in the ethnically Lithuanian lands and is estimated to have constituted about 10-11%, while in the Ruthenian lands of the Grand Duchy only about 3-4%. The nobility in Samogitia was particularly numerous, but usually, it was a poor nobility living in gentry villages. In the right-bank part of Kaunas county the nobility accounted for as much as 25% of the hearths in the late 18th century. In 1777 there were 16,534 noble houses registered (5.2% of the total) in the whole Grand Duchy. In 1790 the register showed 100 palaces, 9,331 manors, 494 noblemen's houses in towns, and 13,890 houses of noblemen without subjects.

Linguistic Polonization did not always mean full Polonization in the state or ethnic sense. The Lithuanian nobility felt united with the Polish nobility as part of one political nation of the Commonwealth, enjoying privileges, freedom and equality. In this sense, they often referred to themselves as "Polish nobility" or outright "Poles". At the same time, separatism and the defense of Lithuanian national separateness within the federation state were very strong. The Lithuanian nobility was warmly attached to the laws, traditions and symbols of the Grand Duchy. Moreover, the Lithuanian separateness was also defended by the members of ethnically Polish families settling in Lithuania.

== Ties to the Kingdom of Poland ==
Following the Union of Horodło (1413), the Lithuanian nobility's rights were equalized with those of the ruling class of the Kingdom of Poland (szlachta). During the following centuries, the Lithuanian nobility began to merge with the Polish nobility. The process accelerated after the Union of Lublin (1569), resulting in the Polish–Lithuanian Commonwealth.

Lithuanian nobility polonised, replacing Lithuanian and Ruthenian languages with Polish although the process took centuries. In the 16th century, a newly established theory amongst Lithuanian nobility was popular, claiming that Lithuanian nobility was of Roman extraction, and the Lithuanian language was just a morphed Latin language. By that time, the upper nobility and the ducal court already used Polish as their first language. The last Grand Duke known to have spoken Lithuanian was Casimir IV Jagiellon (1440-1492). In 1595 Mikalojus Daukša addressed Lithuanian nobility calling for the Lithuanian language to play a more important role in state life. The usage of Lithuanian declined, and the Polish language became the predominant administrative language in the 16th century, eventually replacing Ruthenian as the official language of the Grand Duchy in 1697. Nonetheless, spoken Lithuanian was still common in the Grand Duchy courts during the 17th century.

At first, only Lithuanian magnate families were affected by Polonization, although many of them like the Radziwiłłs remained loyal to the Grand Duchy of Lithuania and safeguarded its sovereignty vis-à-vis the Kingdom of Poland. Gradually Polonization spread to a broader population, and for the most part, the Lithuanian nobility became part of both nations’ szlachta.

The middle nobility adopted the Polish language in the 17th century, while the minor rural nobles remained bilingual up to the period when the question of language related-nationality appeared.

The Lithuanian nobles did preserve their national awareness as members of the Grand Duchy, and in most cases recognition of their Lithuanian family roots; their leaders would continue to represent the interests of the Grand Duchy of Lithuania in the General sejm and in the royal court.

Lithuanian language was used during Kościuszko Uprising in the proclamations calling to rise up For our freedom and yours. And Lithuanian nobles did rise to fight for the independence of their nation.

== After partitions of the Polish–Lithuanian Commonwealth ==
In Lithuania proper, the Polonization of the nobility, gentry and townspeople was practically complete by the early 19th century, relegating the Lithuanian language to the status of a peasant's tongue. The processes of Polonization and russification were partially reversed with the Lithuanian National Revival. Despite origins from mostly the non-noble classes, a number of nobles re-embraced their Lithuanian roots.

The lesser Lithuanian nobility, still partially preserving the Lithuanian language, subsequent to the partitions of the Commonwealth left most of the former Grand Duchy under control of the Russian Empire. The situation worsened during the years of tsar Nicholas I of Russia's rule. After the November uprising imperial officials wanted to minimize the social base for another potential uprising and thus decided to reduce the noble class. During the period 1833–1860, 25,692 people in Vilna Governorate and 17,032 people in Kovno Governorate lost their noble status. They could not prove their status with monarchs' privileges or land ownership. They did not lose personal freedom, but were assigned as one steaders Russian: однодворцы in rural areas and as citizens in towns.

In view of the January Uprising, imperial officials announced that "Lithuanians are Russians seduced by Poles and Catholicism" and banned press in the Lithuanian language and started the Program of Restoration of Russian Beginnings.

Over the course of time, the Lithuanian nobility increasingly developed a sense of belonging to the Polish nation. During the 19th century, a self-designation, often represented using a Latin formula gente Lithuanus, natione Polonus (Lithuanian by birth, Polish by nationality) was common in Lithuania Proper and the former Samogitian Eldership. With Polish culture developing into one of the primary centers of resistance to the Russian Empire, Polonization in some regions actually strengthened in response to official policies of Russification. An even larger percentage of Lithuanian nobility was Polonised and adopted Polish identity by the late 19th century. A Russian census in 1897 showed that 27.7% of nobility living within modern Lithuania's borders recognized Lithuanian as the mother language. This number was even higher in Kovno Governorate, where 36.6% of nobility identified the Lithuanian language as their mother language.

Most descendants of the Lithuanian nobility remained ill-disposed to the modern national movements of Lithuania and Belarus and fought for Poland in 1918-1920. The landowning nobles in the new Lithuanian state saw themselves predominately as Poles of Lithuanian background. During the interbellum years the government of Lithuania issued land reform limiting manors with 150 hectares of land while confiscating land from those nobles who were fighting alongside the Polish in Polish-Lithuanian War. Many members of the Lithuanian nobility during the interbellum and after World War II emigrated to Poland, many were deported to Siberia during the years 1945–53 of Soviet occupation, many manors were destroyed. The Association of Lithuanian Nobility was established in 1994.

== Heraldry ==
Lithuanian and Samogitian families possessed heraldry predating formal Christianization. The most archaic type of post-1413 heraldry has a motive of crossed arrows. According to the Union of Horodło of 1413, 47 Lithuanian and Samogitian noble houses adopted Polish nobility coat of arms. As the nobility expanded during the following centuries more coats of arms were created.

== Influential Lithuanian families ==
=== Families from ethnic Lithuania ===
- House of Olelkowicz (Olelkovych, Alelkaičiai)
- House of Holszański
- House of Ościkowicz (Astikai)
- Balnyte
- House of Borkowski
- House of Czartoryski (Čartoriskiai)
- House of Giedygołd (Gedgaudai)
- House of Gediminid (Gediminaičiai)
- House of Giedroyć (Giedraičiai)
- House of Gasztołd (Goštautai)
- House of Kieżgajło (Kęsgailos)
- Mangirdaičiai
- Mantautaičiai
- House of Pac (Pacas)
- House of Piłsudski
- Purickas (Puricki) (Puriška)
- House of Radziwiłł (Radvila)
- House of Sakowicz
- House of Siesicki (Dowmont-Siesicki, Szeszycki)
- Siručiai
- House of Sudymuntowicz (Sudimantaičiai)
- House of Świrski (Sviriškiai)
- Valmantaičiai
- House of Narutowicz

=== Families from Ruthenia ===
- House of Chodkiewicz
- House of Danielewicz
- House of Dubikowski
- House of Olelkowicz
- Gulka
- House of Hlebowicz
- House of Kalinowski
- House of Krupski
- House of Ogiński (Oginskiai)
- House of Sapieha (Sapiegos)
- House of Tyszkiewicz (Tiškevičiai)
- House of Wiśniowiecki (Višnioveckiai),
- House of Zasławski
- House of Ostrogski
- House of Zbaraski
- House of Domontovich (via Daumantas of Pskov)

=== Muscovite and later Russian princely and noble families originating in Lithuania ===
- Golitsyn
- Kurakins
- Khovansky
- Trubetskoy (via Demetrius I Starshy, son of Algirdas)
- Woroniecki
- Nieswicki (via Kaributas, son of Algirdas)
- Volynsky (via Bobrok)
- Tolstoy
- Mikhalkov
- Stolypin
- Stravinsky
- Bulgakov
- Mstislavsky
- Belsky
- Sheremetev family (via Feodor Koshka)
- Skarzynski

=== Families from Livonia ===
- Plater (Pliateriai)
- Tyzenhaus (Tyzenhauzai)
- Römer (Riomeriai)
- Pahlen
- Barclay de Tolly
- Lieven

=== Families from the Republic of Venice ===
- Dražba (Dražbos)

=== Families from Republic of Lucca ===
- Moriconi

=== Families from Ferrara and/or Modena ===
- Carpi

=== Families from Courland ===
- Landsberg (Landsbergis)

== See also ==
- List of early Lithuanian dukes
- List of Lithuanian rulers
- Germanic monarchy for references to Germanic synonym of kuningaz (Modern German: König, English: king).
- Szlachta
- List of szlachta

== Bibliography ==
- Kiaupa, Zigmantas; Kiaupienė, Jūratė; Kuncevičius, Albinas (2000). The History of Lithuania Before 1795. Vilnius: Lithuanian Institute of History. ISBN 978-9986-810-13-1.
- Frost, Robert (2015). The Oxford History of Poland-Lithuania. Vol. I: The Making of the Polish-Lithuanian Union, 1385–1569. Oxford.
- Kowalski, Mariusz (2013). Księstwa Rzeczpospolitej. Państwo magnackie jako region polityczny [Duchies of the Polish-Lithuanian Commonwealth. The magnate lordship as a political region] (in Polish).
- Łowmiański, Henryk (1932). Studja nad początkami społeczeństwa i państwa litewskiego [Studies on the beginnings of Lithuanian society and state] (in Polish). Vol. 2. Vilnius.
- Wolff, Józef (1895). "Kniaziowie litewsko-ruscy od końca czternastego wieku" [Lithuanian-Ruthenian knyazes from the end of the fourteenth century]. Biblioteka Instytutu Historii Uam (in Polish). Warsaw.
- Buchowski, Krzysztof (2006). Litwomani i polonizatorzy: Mity, wzajemne postrzeganie i stereotypy w stosunkach polsko-litewskich w pierwszej połowie XX wieku [Lithuanomans and Polonizers: Myths, mutual perceptions and stereotypes in Polish-Lithuanian relations in the first half of the 20th century] (PDF) (in Polish). Białystok: Wydawnictwo Uniwersytetu w Białymstoku. ISBN 978-83-7431-075-8.
