= Astikas =

- Lithuanian surname
- m.: Astikas
- f.: (unmarried): Astikaitė
- f.: (married): Astikienė

Astikas is a Lithuanian surname belonging to the noble Lithuanian family of Astikai, Notable people with the surname include:

- Grigalius Astikas (1470–1518 or 1519), Lithuanian nobleman and statesman
- Jurgis Astikas (1530–1579) Lithuanian nobleman
- Kristinas Astikas (1363–1442 or 1444), Lithuanian noble and statesman
- Radvila Astikas (died 1477), Lithuanian nobleman
- Stanislovas Astikas (died 1519), Lithuanian statesman, voivode of Polotsk
