= Turiisk =

Rural locality in Volyn Oblast, Ukraine

Turiisk Турійськ
- Rural settlement
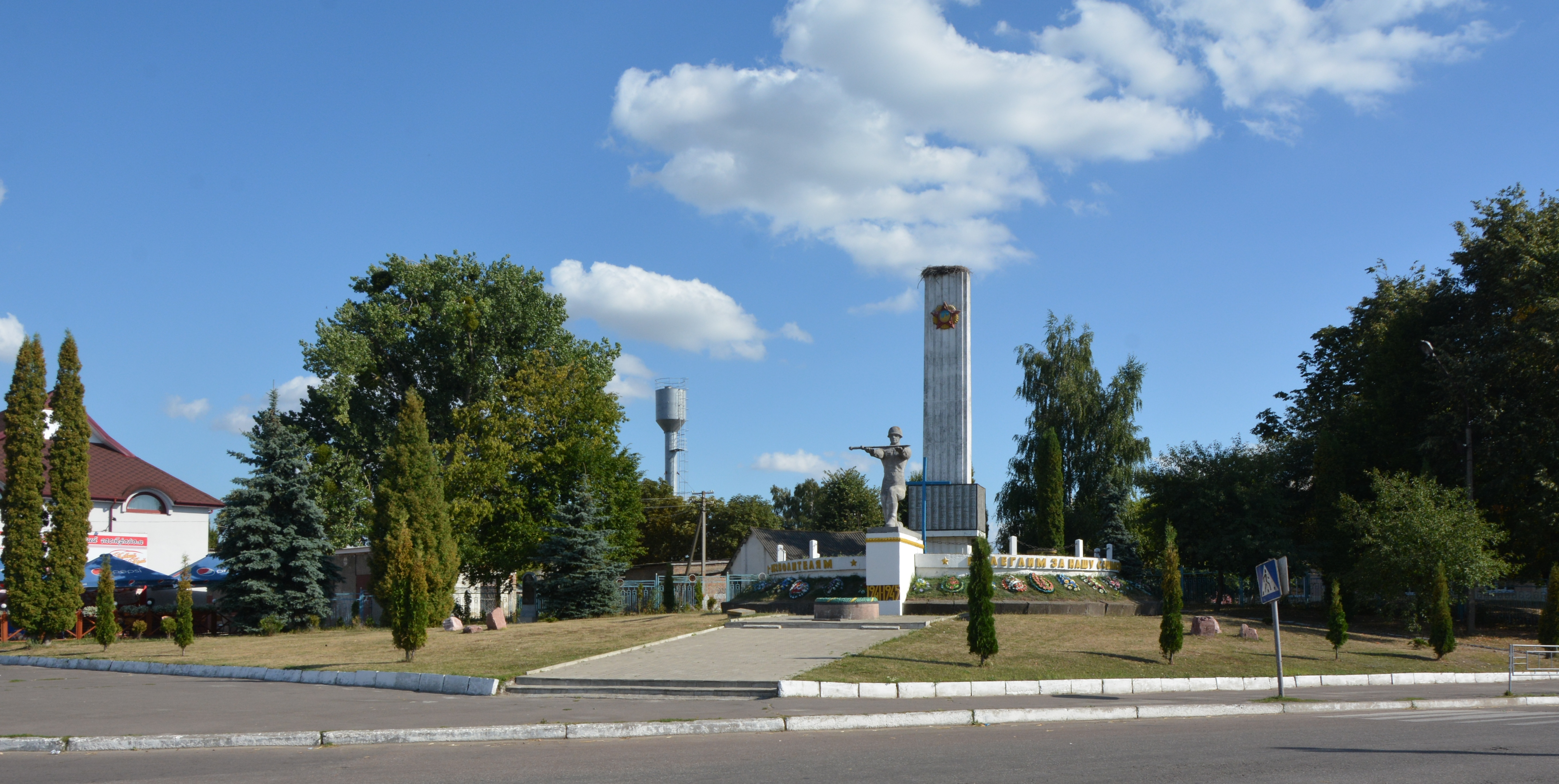
- WW2 memorial in Turiisk

- Coat of arms

- Location in Volyn Oblast Location in Ukraine
- Coordinates: 51°05′N 24°32′E
- Country: Ukraine
- Oblast: Volyn Oblast
- Raion: Kovel Raion
- Hromada: Turiisk settlement hromada

Population (2022)
  - Total: 5,808
- Time zone: UTC+2 (EET)
  - Summer (DST): UTC+3 (EEST)

Turiisk (Ukrainian: Турійськ) is a rural settlement in Volyn Oblast, western Ukraine. It is located in the historic region of Volhynia. It is located in Kovel Raion. Population: 5,432 (2024 estimate); 5,808 (2022 estimate).

== History ==
In 1205, it was captured by Lithuanians and Yotvingians. In the Polish–Lithuanian peace treaty of 1366, it was confirmed as part of Poland. In 1504 King Alexander Jagiellon established weekly markets. In 1516, King Sigismund I the Old granted the town to Roman Sanguszko. Later on, it subsequently passed to the Zasławski, Lubomirski, Stadnicki, Ossoliński, Moszyński and Szembek families. In 1652–1653, sessions of the sejmik (regional parliament) of the Volhynian Voivodeship were held in the town. In 1773, Józef Kanty Ossoliński obtained permission to hold two annual fairs.

Graves of Jewish and Polish victims of World War II

Following the German-Soviet invasion of Poland, which started World War II in September 1939, the settlement was occupied by the Soviet Union until 1941 and then by Germany until 1944. In 1939, a local Ukrainian murdered two Poles, including a Lieutenant of the Polish Army. Several Poles who were either born or lived and worked in Turzysk, including a local municipal official and the local police chief, were murdered by the Russians in the Katyn massacre in 1940. In 1942, Jews of the village were murdered by an Einsatzgruppen assisted by the Ukrainian auxiliary police in a mass execution. Among the 1,100 victims were mainly women, children, the elderly, merchants, the unemployed, and religious leaders. The rest were deported to the ghetto in Włodzimierz. In mid-1943, Polish inhabitants fled either to Kowel or Zasmyki fearing a possible massacre by the Ukrainians, and then the Ukrainians fled in fear of a German reprisal after the nationalist Ukrainian Insurgent Army killed a German gendarmerie chief. From 15 to 20 July 1943, the town was briefly controlled by the Ukrainian Insurgent Army. In March 1944, it was captured by the Red Army, and then annexed into the Ukrainian Soviet Socialist Republic.

Until 26 January 2024, Turiisk was designated urban-type settlement. On this day, a new law entered into force which abolished this status, and Turiisk became a rural settlement.
