= Battle of Czasniki =

The battle of Czasniki can refer to these battles:

- Battle of Czasniki (1564) during the Livonian War
- Battle of Czasniki (1567) during the Livonian War
- Battle of Czasniki (1812) during the French invasion of Russia
