= Battle of the Ula =

1564 battle of the Livonian War

Battle of Ula
- Part of the Livonian War
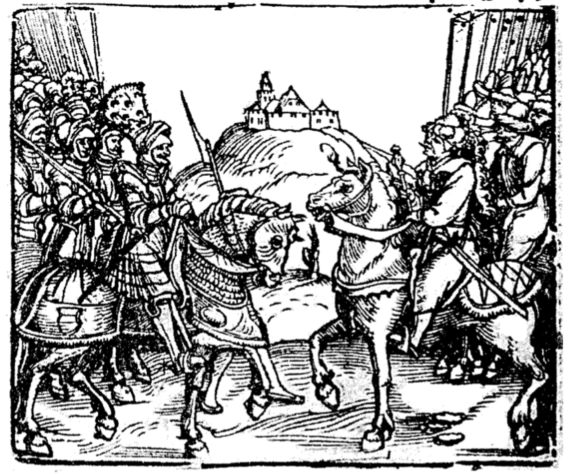
| Date | 26 January 1564 |
| Location | North of Chashniki (modern Belarus) 54°53′51″N 29°09′18″E |
| Result | Lithuanian victory |

Belligerents
| Grand Duchy of Lithuania | Tsardom of Russia |

Commanders and leaders
| Mikołaj "the Red" Radziwiłł | Pyotr Shuysky † |

Strength
| 4,000–6,000 or 10,000 | 17,000−24,000 |

Casualties and losses
| 20 dead, 700 injured | Russian chronicles: 150–700 dead Lithuanian claims: 9,000 to 20,000 dead Independent estimate: 1,500 to 2,000 killed, wounded or captured |
- Location within Belarus Battle of the Ula (European Russia)

The Battle of the Ula or Battle of Chashniki was fought during the Livonian War on 26 January 1564 between the Grand Duchy of Lithuania and the Tsardom of Russia on the Ula River (tributary of the Daugava River) north of Chashniki in the Vitebsk Region. The Russian troops, unarmed and moving in a loose formation, were taken by complete surprise and defeated, losing their large wagon train.

== Background ==
During the Livonian War, Livonia was invaded by the Russian army of Tsar Ivan IV. After defeat in the Battle of Ergeme in 1560, the weakened Livonian Order was dissolved, and the Duchy of Livonia and Duchy of Courland and Semigallia were ceded to the Grand Duchy of Lithuania according to the Treaty of Vilnius (1561). Russia then launched a campaign against Lithuania, capturing Polotsk in February 1563 and threatening further invasion against Vilnius, the capital city. The Lithuanians attempted to negotiate a truce, but the talks failed in November 1563.

== Battle ==
Two large Russian armies from Polotsk and Smolensk, commanded by Pyotr Shuysky and Pyotr Serebryany-Obolensky, were to meet near Orsha and jointly march against Vilnius. The army was well-prepared for a long campaign; Velikiye Luki received supplies sufficient to provide the army for half a year. Shuysky moved on January 23, 1564. Not expecting to meet any large enemy forces on his path, he made a critical mistake by allowing his troops to march without order and with their armor and weapons being carried in the wagon train. Mikołaj "the Red" Radziwiłł, Grand Lithuanian Hetman, who at the time was in Lukoml, quickly organized cavalrymen without waiting for infantry or artillery. His men included Field Hetman Hrehory Chodkiewicz and many future military leaders: his 16-year-old son and future grand hetman Krzysztof Mikołaj "the Thunderbolt" Radziwiłł, future field hetman Roman Sanguszko, future Livonian hetman Jan Hieronimowicz Chodkiewicz, and others.

The details of the battle vary based on source. There are at least 15 contemporary sources, including three official reports written within days after the battle and four artistic works glorifying the winners, but they all provide different and often conflicting details and statistics. Radziwiłł attacked Shuysky's army while it marched from Polotsk to Drutsk. Two main versions of the battle can be identified. The first version claims that the Russians were either carelessly marching in a loose order or making preparations for the night rest and were unarmed at the time of the attack. A small Lithuanian detachment engaged the vanguard units, while the main forces attacked the unprepared Russian troops. The second, Lithuanian version claims that Shuysky positioned his army for an attack in an open field and was ready to attack the Lithuanians as soon as they emerged from the woods. However, perhaps overconfident in his numbers, he delayed the initial attack and allowed the Lithuanians enough time to position their troops.

All sources agree that the Lithuanians achieved a complete victory and that Russian commander Prince Pyotr Shuysky was killed in action. There are several versions of Shuysky's death. The most popular version claims that he was injured and retreated from the battlefield and was later axed to death by a local peasant. Another version has it that he was found in a well with a bullet hole in his head. Mikołaj "the Red" Radziwiłł claimed that it was his client Kasparas Šveikovskis who killed Shuysky. His body was transported to Vilnius and buried with full honors in an Orthodox church. It was claimed that many other boyars were killed or taken prisoners. The exact number of Russian casualties sustained in this battle varies from 150 to 700 men in Russian chronicles; the first estimate is regarded as incomplete. The Lithuanians claimed to have defeated 9,000 or even 20,000, a figure that is considered as heavily exaggerated. The large Russian wagon train was lost and, according to a witness, so much loot was taken that soldiers gave away bread for free and armor was sold for one Hungarian gold coin.

== Aftermath ==
Upon learning of the defeat of Shuysky and the loss of the much-needed wagon train, the army of Prince Serebryany-Obolensky safely retreated to Russian territory, bringing significant damage to the enemy by devastating and sacking a large swathe of Lithuanian territory in passing, defeating Lithuanian squads, and taking numerous prisoners. It was attacked by Filon Kmita and Jurgis Astikas near Orsha and, believing that they were attacked by the main Lithuanian forces, hastily retreated further. These two victories averted the Russian invasion and restored the power balance in the Livonian War. The Lithuanians devastated a wide area around Sebezh, but, expecting the Tatars to assist them in waging war on the Russian realm, did not have enough momentum to recapture Polotsk during a three-week siege.

Although the battle slowed down one of the Russian offensives in January, it did not change the course of the ongoing border war which was not much in favour of the Lithuanians. The battle was followed by skirmishes and Lithuania could not recover the significant lost territories. In the very same month, as well as in February, other Russian armies launched numerous and successful attacks against their foe. In January, voivodes from Nevel and Polotsk conducted an offensive against Lithuania, while in January and February, Russian forces attacked Dubrovno, Orsha, Druchesk, Borisov, Kopys, Shklov, Teterino, Mogilev, Radoml, Mstislavl, and Chechersk, reaching as far as the border of Vilnius and the Berezina River. In August 1564, a Russian squad of Boyars' Sons from Pskov, led by V. Veshnyakov, defeated a Lithuanian force at Krasny Gorodok. At the end of the same month, Russian Tatars from Kazan and Astrakhan, commanded by V. Buturlin, arrived and waged war on Lithuania. In October, the Russians captured the town of Ozerische. In 1565, both sides continued their struggle against each other, though with a lower intensity. This time the Lithuanians tried in vain to take the city of Krasny in October and sacked some Russian volosts, whereas Russian Cossacks responded with sacking numerous villages on Lithuanian territory.

The Lithuanians used their victory at Ula to derail negotiations for the Union of Lublin, which were initiated in hopes to obtain Polish military support in the war with Russia. Some authors believe that defeats in the Livonian War might have contributed to the deterioration of Ivan IV's mental state, leading to the establishment of oprichnina in 1565.
