= House of Puzyna =

Noble family

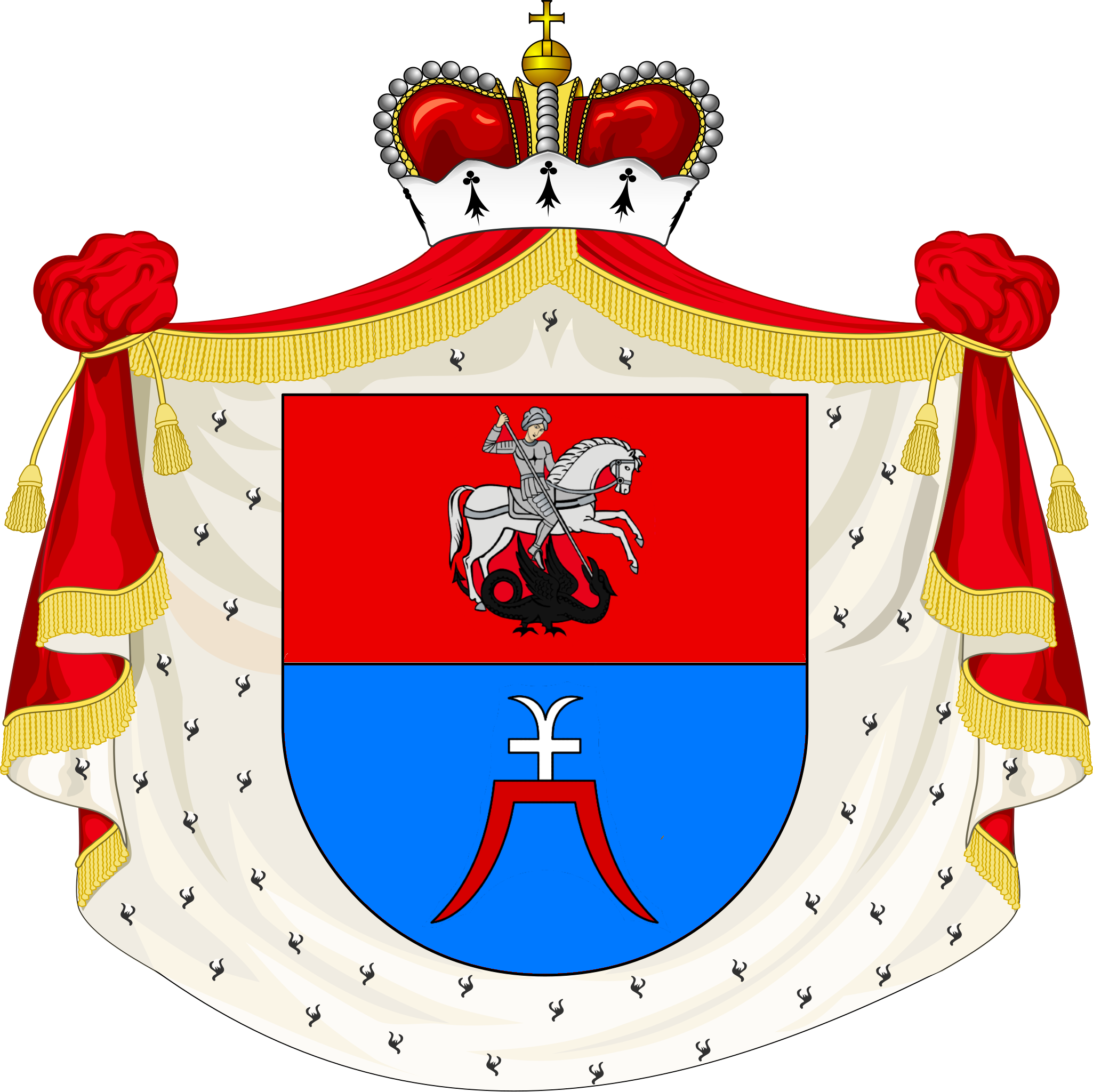
Coat of arms of the princely Puzyna family

The House of Puzyna is a Rurikid princely house originating from Ruthenia or the Smolensk region. Their most prominent members lived in the early 20th century.

During the Polish–Lithuanian Commonwealth, they held a princely title among the Lithuanian nobility.

== History ==
Mostly because the archival documentation of the 14th century is weak, thanks to Mongol depredations, their precise lineage from Rurik is under shroud. Their tradition, as well as that of the family of Ogiński, refer to them being descended from rulers of the principality of Kozelsk. Several versions of their precise Rurikid origins have been presented.

The Rurikid dynasty's branch of Kozelsk flourished in the 14th century. As one of the Oka principalities in the region of Upper Oka, near Smolensk. These princes were said to be descended from Saint Michael of Chernigov who was martyred in 1246. (It is generally in published family trees that their one forefather was St.Michael's descendant prince Tit - but nothing more is actually known of this Tit than merely his name, without even explicit attestation of his patronymic, and names of one or more of his historically attested sons, and that in those generations his family -branch- held Kozelsk and Karachev. We can be relatively certain of this Tit's existence because at least one son of his in mid-14th century carried the patronymic 'Titovich' in his near-contemporary documentation.) Better historical sources know the early forefathers of the Puzyna and Oginskis, princes bynamed Hlazyna and Gluszonek who were magnates in the region of Smolensk in the late 15th century. These princes Hlazyna would thus have been descendants of some branch of Dukes of Kozelsk.

In 1408 the Duke of Kozelsk held Rzhev, had the town built. He was possibly merely a kinsman of the Oginski and Puzyna ancestors, and not their direct forefather, as the Kozelsk family seems to have developed several branches already prior to that date.

- There are historically weak beliefs that the Puzyna were branched from the Oginskis by the somewhat unhistorical brothers Grigor 'the fire' (for his hot temper) and Valadimir 'the bubble' (for being obese), allegedly respectively forefathers of the Oginski and the Puzyna, who would have been sons of a prince Tit or a prince Juri or a prince Tit-Juri, of Kozelsk, one allegedly in the 15th generation from Rurik. However, sources contemporary to those centuries do not mention such things (source: Rodoslovtsah). These still have found their way to a lot of genealogies (compare for example the publications of Peter V Dolgorukov). Quite possibly, this another, later Tit is just a genealogically invented ghost of the real Tit whose existence is known from his son's patronymic.

In 1486, boyar Dmitrijus Ivanovičius Hlušonokas received the manor and fief of Uogintai, near Žiežmariai in Lithuania proper. His descendants became known as Oginskis, the Lithuanian branch of the Hlazyna. Prince Teodoras Bogdanaitis appears as the first of this lineage with the byname Oginski.

In the early 16th century, Dmitrijus' younger brother, the Belarusian prince Ivan Ivanovich Hluszonak was contemporary of king Sigismund I of Poland as well as his official, and his son prince Timofej Ivanovich was known with byname 'puzyna'. It was this branch which developed to the lineage of Puzyna. Vasilij Ivanovich received from king in 1516 the estate of Nosov in Melnitski (Археографический сборник документов, относящихся к истории Северо-Западной Руси, t. 3, №4, p. 4-5). It seems that these persons are present in later generations of Puzyna in the works of Dolgorukov, as well as in the findings of the Polish Jesuit Andrzej Pezharski, in his book 'Annibal ad Portas'. The name of Puzyna appears to have been found in chronicles in the 16th century.

So, the two bynames (Oginskis and Puzyna) actually formed only in later generations of the two brothers, and not yet to the two brothers themselves. But it has been easy although mistaken to try to make already two brothers to carry the nicknames. Since bynames of the real historically attested brothers Dimitrijus and Ivan were actually not such, this has presumably led to confusions about what were the first names of the two brothers who started the branches, some thus picking up the unhistorical names Grigor and Valadimir, as well as the 'mythical' forefather name Tit (who was real person in the ancestry but farther back) as their father.

These two brothers (Dimitrijus, Ivan) were sons of prince Ivan Vasilievich, son of one Vasili Hlazyna, a Ruthenian princely magnate in region of Smolensk. All in all, prince Ivan Vasilievich had five sons: Dmitri, Ivan, Leo, Michael and Andrew, according to Ptashitski.

Vasili Hlazyna's other son (according to S L Ptashitski) was prince Olehno Vasilievich, who fled to Moscow and thus left Belarusia-Lithuania.

The princes of Puzyna have as their earliest historically attested patrilineal forefather the said Vasili Hlazyna in the mid-15th century - just as the record-harmed Mongol-domination epoch was over. In light of strict research, there is not an attested lineage back to Rurikids. They just appear from post-Mongol mists of history. However, the princely title which was accorded to the family, speaks for a Rurikid patriline. The Rurikid DNA project by Y DNA evidence has proven that the Puzyna belong to the patriline of the Rurikids. The tradition being Rurikid is correct.

Material: Russian Wikipedia

== Notable members ==
- Jan Puzyna de Kosielsko

== Literature ==
- Ptaš'ickij, S.L., Knâz'â Puzyny - istoriko-genealogičesk'i.e. mater'ialy
