= Kristinas Astikas =

Lithuanian noble and statesman (1363–1442/1444)

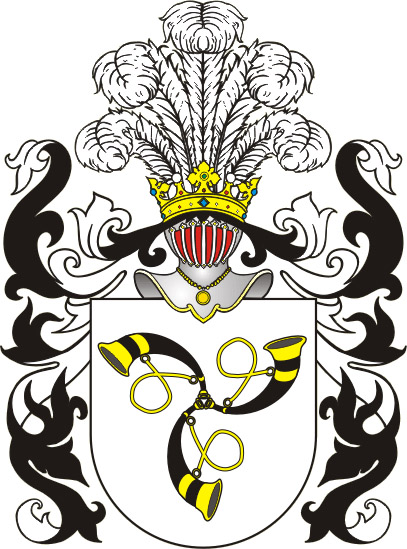
Trąby coat of arms, granted to Kristinas Astikas' family in 1413

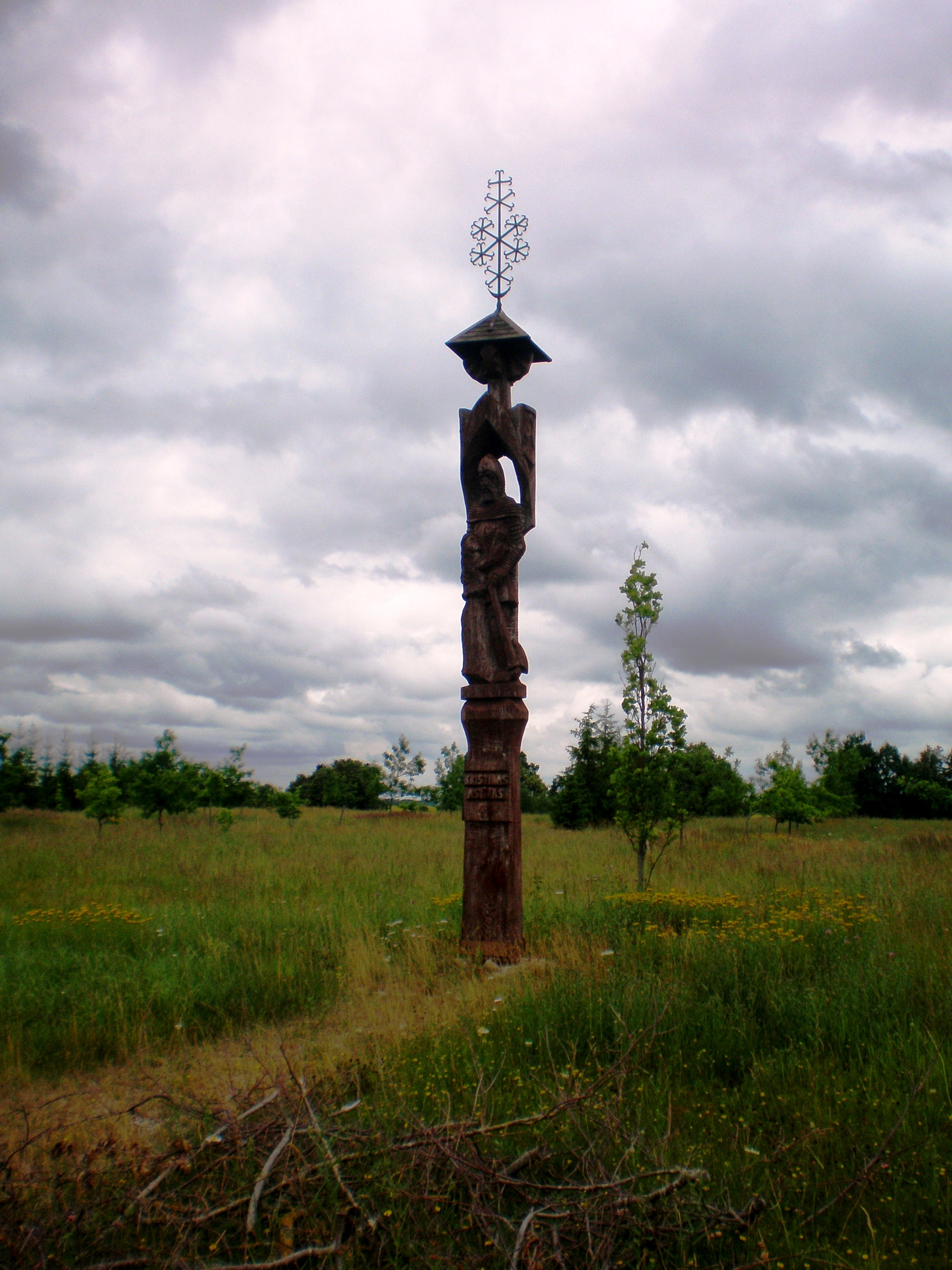
Wooden sculpture in traditional Lithuanian style to Astikas in Cinkiškiai

Kristinas Astikas (1363 in Trakai – 1442 or 1444) was a leading Lithuanian noble and statesman of the Astikai family. Kristinas was a supporter and a companion of Vytautas the Great, his brother Sigismund Kestutaitis and nephew Casimir Jagiellon, he became the Castellan of Vilnius in 1419.

Kristinas is mentioned in 1398 in the Treaty of Salynas between the Grand Duchy of Lithuania and the Teutonic Order; he also participated in the signing of other important treaties, including the Peace of Thorn in 1411, the Treaty of Melno in 1422, and the Union of Grodno in 1432. At the signing of the Union of Horodło in 1413 he received the coat of arms of Trąby. Astikas (also spelt as Oscik, Ostyk or Ostik) was his original Lithuanian pagan name, used by some of his descendants as their family name, while Kristinas (Christian) was his Christian name. According to the Polish linguist Lilia Citko, the name Ościk (rendered as an Ostyk by sources of the time) comes from Evstafij, the East Slavonic form of the Christian name.

He is said by some historians to be descended from the Duke of Kernavė Sirputis, brother of the Grand Duke of Lithuania Traidenis. Kristinas had four known sons: Stanislovas (sometimes also called Stankus), Mikalojus, Baltramiejus and Radvila. Stanislovas Astikaitis became Voivod of Navahrudek and his descendants used the family name of Astikaitis. Radvila became Voivod of Trakai and his line used his name as their family name, so he is known as the founder of the Radvila (Polish Radziwiłł) family. Kristinas was the first known owner of Upninkai and Musninkai with their lands. He was also the owner of Alanta and Užpaliai in Lithuania. Some of the lands, including Alanta, were granted to him for his service to Grand Duke of Lithuania Sigismund Kęstutaitis.
