= Roman Sanguszko (died 1571) =

Lithuanian nobleman

Roman Fedorovich Sanguszko
- Prince; Field Hetman of Lithuania
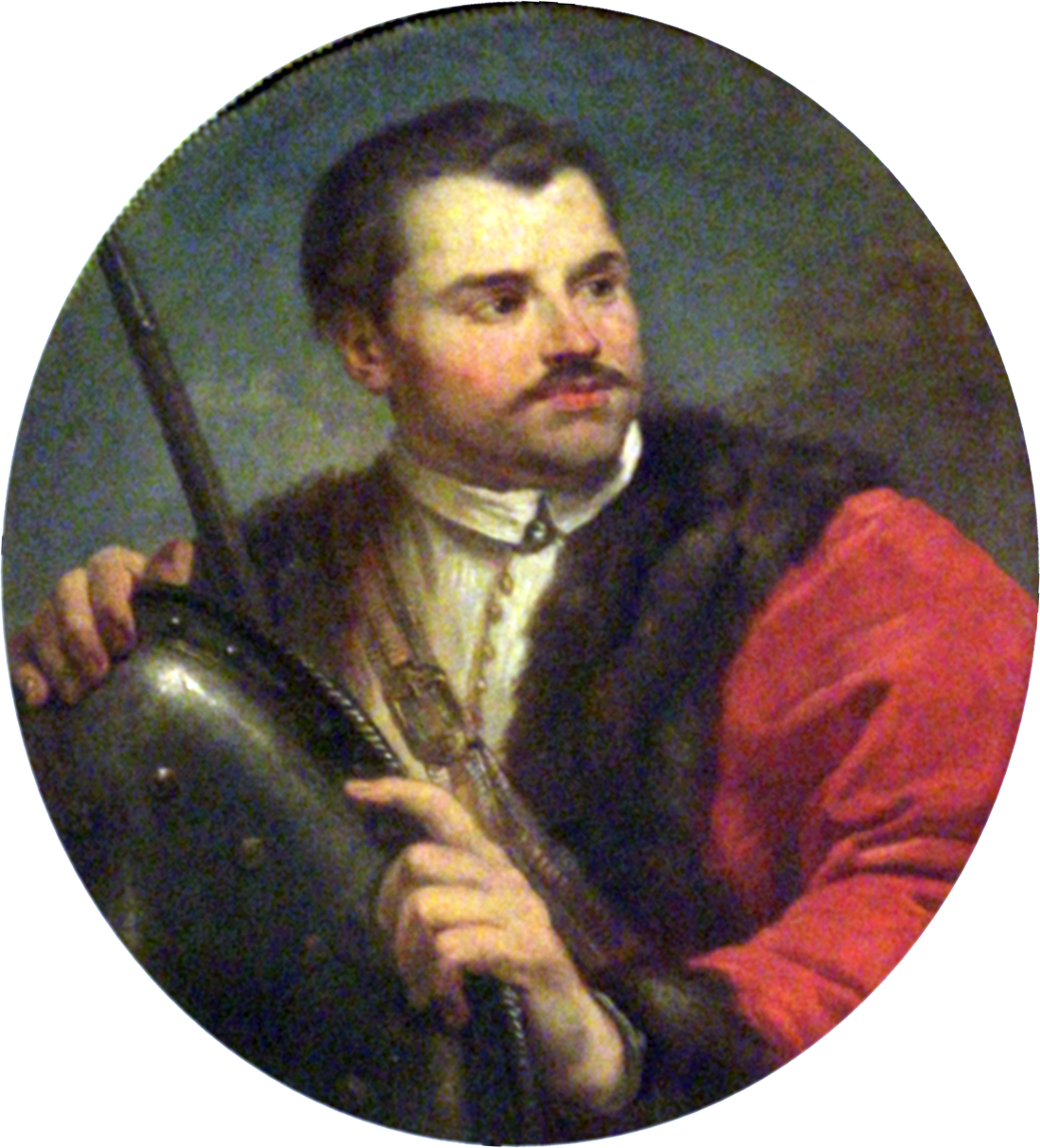
- A posthumous portrait of Roman Sanguszko by Marcello Bacciarelli, 1781: one of the images of Famous Poles from the Knight's Hall at the Royal Castle, Warsaw
- Born: (possibly) 1537; Volhynia, Grand Duchy of Lithuania
- Died: March 12,1571; Różan, Masovian Voivodeship, Poland-Lithuania Commonwealth
- Burial: Mykolaiv Miletsky Monastery, Miltsy, Ukraine
- Spouse: Alexandra Grigorievna Khodkevich
- Issue: Alexandra, Teodora, & Teodor
- Dynasty: Sanguszko
- Father: Fedor Andreevich Sanguszko
- Mother: Anna Ivanovna Brankovich
- Religion: Eastern Orthodoxy

Prince Roman Fedorovich Sanguszko (Lithuanian: Romanas Sanguška; c. 1537 – 12 May 1571) was a soldier and statesman of the Grand Duchy of Lithuania. He served as governor (voivode) of Bracław and was Field Hetman of Lithuania from 1567 until his death. He fought at the Battle of Ula in 1564 and belonged to the Nesuhoizhskoy branch of the House of Sanguszko.

== Sources ==
- (in Russian) https://ru.wikisource.org/wiki/%D0%A0%D0%91%D0%A1/%D0%92%D0%A2/%D0%A1%D0%B0%D0%BD%D0%B3%D1%83%D1%88%D0%BA%D0%B8
- (in Polish) Marcin Spórna. Słownik najsłynniejszych wodzów i dowódców polskich. Kraków 2006. ISBN 83-7435-094-6
- (in Polish) Mariusz Machynia. Sanguszko (Sanguszkowicz) Roman, kniaź z linii niesuchojesko-łokackiej (ok. 1537–1571) / Polski Słownik Biograficzny. — Wrocław — Warszawa — Kraków: Zakład Narodowy Imienia Ossolińskich Wydawnictwo Polskiej Akademii Nauk, 1993.— Tom XXXIV/4. — Zeszyt 143.— S. 500–505 (пол.).
