= Filon Kmita =

Polish noble (1530–1587)

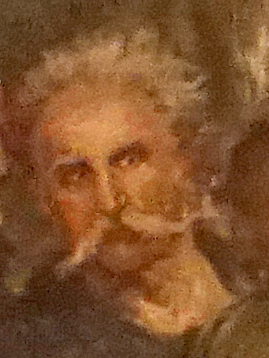
- Filon Kmita in the painting by Jan Matejko "Stephen Báthory at Pskov"

Voivode of Smolensk
- Reign: 1579–1587
- Predecessor: Jurgis Astikas
- Successor: Jonas Abramavičius

Starost of Orsha
- Reign: 1566–1578
- Born: 1530; Kiev Voivodeship
- Died: 1587 (aged 56–57)
- House: House of Kmita
- Father: Semion Kmita
- Mother: Tatiana Kroszyńska
- Religion: Orthodox

Filon Kmita (1530–1587), also known as Kmita the Chernobylan, was a noble in the Grand Duchy of Lithuania and Polish–Lithuanian Commonwealth. Filon Kmita was notable for conducting counter-intelligence in the Muscovite wars and establishing a spy network in Russia, as well as successfully leading ambush attacks with considerably fewer soldiers than the enemy.

== Biography ==
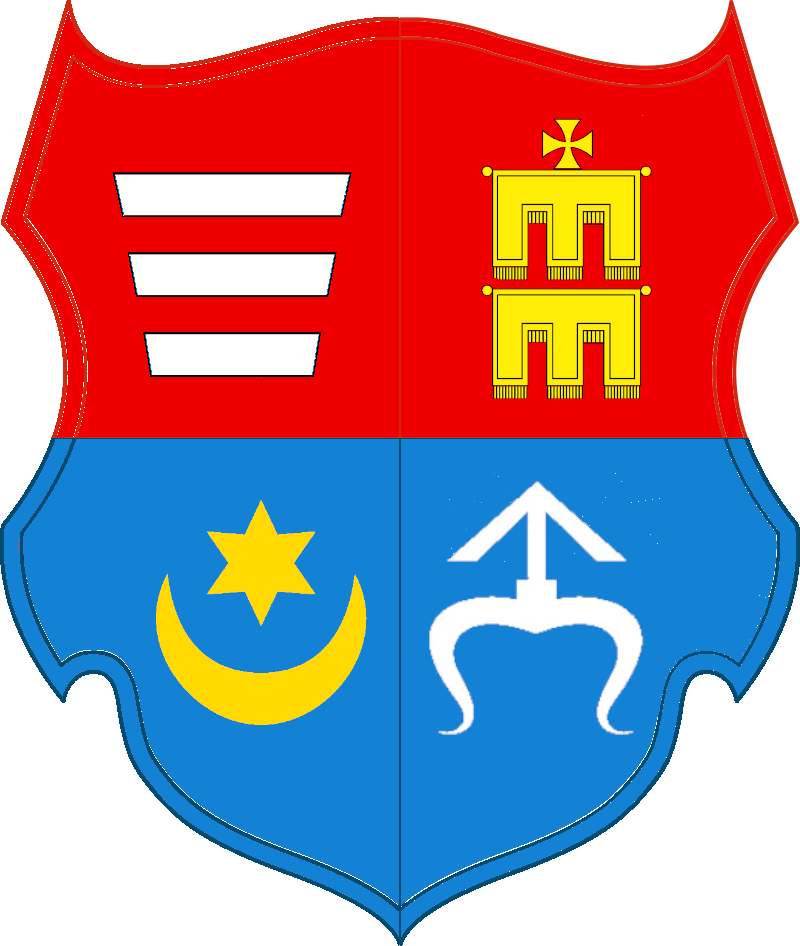
Kmita family coat of arms

=== Early years and first position ===
Filon Kmita was born in 1530 in the Kiev Voivodeship to the Kmitów noble family as a son of Semion Kmita and Tatiana Kroszyńska. His father participated in battles between the Ukrainian Cossacks and Tatars, and Filon from a young age would be involved in various wars alongside him. Filon Kmita began his service in 1552 as the leader of a small border fortress on the Oster river. Here in 1562, he was noted for repelling a Muscovite regiment of 2,000 soldiers with just 300 horsemen. In the same year, he would gather a regiment of 1,400 soldiers and occupy Chernigov, a Muscovite fortress that up until then had not been taken.

=== Skirmishes with the Muscovites ===
For his success in Chernigov, Filon Kmita would receive to govern the area of Chernobyl (and as such would be called Kmita the Chernobylian). In 1566 he would become the starost of Orsha. Kmita would also be noted for his excellent organizational skills and fast attack into the Muscovite lands in the summer of 1579, at the same time as commander Krzysztof Radziwiłł almost captured the Russian ruler. In the same year, he became Voivode of Smolensk.

=== Final years ===
In 1580, Kmita was mistaken by a message of a double agent and attempted to take over the strongest Muscovite fortress – Smolensk – with only 9,000 soldiers but failed. Despite the failure, Filon Kmita would continue to organize raids and various ambushes along the border. In 1582 Kmita also silently ambushed a Muscovite unit belonging to the Smolensk region. Filon Kmita would die in 1587, being a senator of the Grand Duchy of Lithuania. His grave did not survive, but the epitaph did. It reads: "Manly, glorious senator of Sarmatia, lord of Smolensk, clever in the field of battle, first among the first."

== Methods during leadership ==
=== Unit ===
During the wars with the Muscovites, Filon Kmita was the head of a small unit of 200 hussars. It is believed that the unit consisted of battle-hardened and heavily armored 140 hussars and 60 Cossacks. Introduction to the unit was based on the skill of the soldier, rather than the soldier's ethnicity or religious beliefs. Kmita's unit consisted of not only Lithuanians but also Poles and Ruthenians.

=== Intelligence gathering ===
Once Kmita captured the city of Orsha, he made it the center of his intelligence operations, which he would use to receive information about the movement of Tatar or Muscovite units. A part of the useful information Filon Kmita would receive, he would simply buy or receive it from deserters, merchants, or various others travelers. Such useful information via secret letter Filon Kmita would send back to the Lithuanian Council of Lords as well as the rulers of Lithuania, Poland, and the most notable of nobles at the time. Since around 30 of these letters have survived, we know some names, or perhaps pseudonyms, of certain agents of his. Kmita's agents also assisted in the rescuing of certain Lithuanian soldiers to break free from the prison and get to Orsha.

Kmita's network also developed a sophisticated messaging system. Operators on the border of the nation were instructed to periodically check an isolated singular spruce tree - if the second branch from the bottom was broken - it meant the Muscovites are organizing a war expedition against the nation. Likewise, if the branch was not broken, then the message was to remain calm for now. It is said that Kmita's unit created an unusual version of telling whether someone was telling the truth. The interrogated person would have their mouth filled with buckwheat flour, and if the flour remained dry, the person was supposedly lying. Some have theorized that it is thanks to Kmita's agents that the Muscovite dissident and duke Andrey Kurbsky entered the Lithuanian side. Kmita himself wrote some letters to Tsar Ivan the Terrible dedicated to further incite paranoia among the enemy circle, which also according to the theory supposedly lead to the sack of Novgorod.
