= Jurgis Astikas =

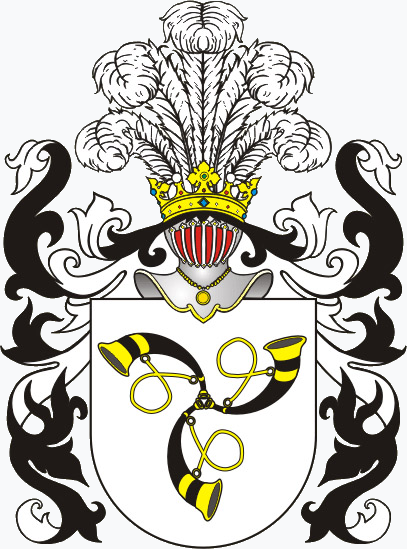
- Coat of Arms of the Astikai family

Starost of Braslaw
- Reign: 1558–1579

Voivode of Mstsislaw
- Reign: 1566–1579
- Successor: Povilas Pacas

Voivode of Smolensk
- Reign: 1578–1579
- Predecessor: Grigalius Valavičius
- Successor: Filon Kmita
- Born: 1530
- Died: 1579; Grand Duchy of Lithuania
- House: Astikai
- Father: Jurgis Stanislovas Astikaitis
- Religion: Calvinist

Jurgis Astikas or Jurgis Astikaitis (1530–1579) was a Lithuanian nobleman of the Grand Duchy of Lithuania and a member of the noble Astikai family. He participated in the Livonian War and signing of the election of king Henry of Valois after the death of king Sigismund Augustus in 1572. Jurgis was executed in Lithuania in 1579 under suspicions of plotting to assassinate king Stephen Báthory. Jurgis did not leave any descendants.
