= Radvila Astikas =

Lithuanian nobleman; founder of the Radvila family

- Grand Marshal of Lithuania; Voivode of Trakai; Castellan of Vilnius
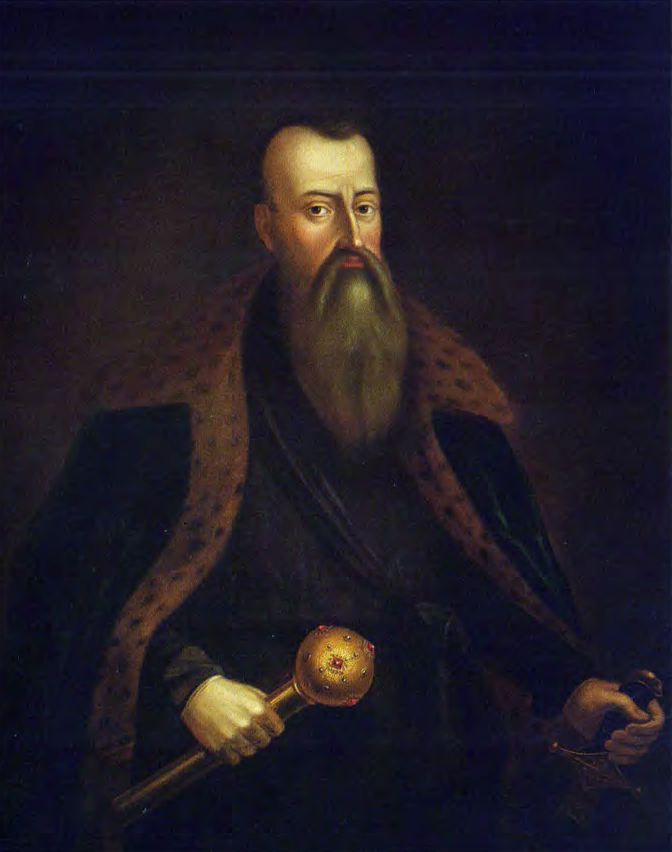
- Imaginary 19th-century portrait
- Died: 1477
- Noble family: Astikai; Radziwiłł (founder)
- Issue: Mikalojus Radvila the Old; Anna
- Father: Kristinas Astikas
- Mother: Anna

Radvila Astikas or Astikaitis (baptized Nicholas; Polish: Radziwiłł Ościkowicz; died in 1477) was a magnate, a member of the Astikai and founder of the Radziwiłł family. He was a member of the Lithuanian Council of Lords and one of the most influential people in the Grand Duchy of Lithuania during his lifetime.

Astikas was one of the sons of Kristinas Astikas. He was first mentioned in written sources in the 1411 Treaty of Melno. He was Grand Duke's marshal in 1420–29 and 1440–52. Radvila Astikas was Voivode of Trakai (1466–77) and Castellan of Vilnius (1475–77), as well as Grand Marshal of Lithuania (1433–34, 1463–74). He was sent to several diplomatic missions: to Teutonic Knights in 1466, 1447, and 1448, to Golden Horde in 1452. He also participated in negotiating the 1473 Treaty of Kurcums which defined the Lithuanian–Livonian border. There were rumors that in 1440 Astikas was considered as a candidate to the Grand Duke's throne instead of Casimir Jagiellon, but they should be taken with a grain of salt.

Astikas' patrimonial lands were around Kernavė, Anykščiai, Užpaliai. His most important patrimonial possession was Musninkai where he funded a Catholic church. In 1447, Grand Duke Casimir Jagiellon gifted Kėdainiai to Astikas and he was instrumental in turning the village into a growing trade center that traded with the Hanseatic League. Additionally, he had landholdings in Upninkai, Širvintos, Biržai, Vyžuona, and others. Astikas also donated for the construction of St. George Church, Kaunas.

His wife's name or origin is unknown. His son Mikalojus Radvila nicknamed "the Old" was the first to carry "Radvila" as a family name. His daughter Anna married Petka Jogailavičius (Petko Jagojłowicz). Astikas and his wife Eudoxia were the great-great-great grandparents of Elizabeth Báthory.

== Sources ==
- Petrauskas, Rimvydas (2003). Lietuvos diduomenė XIV a. pabaigoje – XV a. (in Lithuanian). Aidai. ISBN 9955-445-67-X.
- Petrauskas, Rimvydas; Kiaupienė, Jūratė (2009). Lietuvos istorija. Nauji horizontai: dinastija, visuomenė, valstybė (in Lithuanian). Vol. IV. Baltos lankos. ISBN 978-9955-23-239-1.
