= Grzegorz Błaszczyk =

Polish historian

- Born: 1953 (age 72–73); Poznań, Poland
- Education: Adam Mickiewicz University
- Occupation: Historian
- Title: Prof. Dr. Hab.

Grzegorz Błaszczyk (born 1953 in Poznań) is a Polish historian, professor at the Adam Mickiewicz University.

He graduated from the Adam Mickiewicz University in 1977 and gained a Ph.D. from this university in 1983. In 1993 he passed his habilitation. In 1999 Błaszczyk gained the title of professor.

He specializes in the history of Grand Duchy of Lithuania. He is the author of 11 books and more than 100 other publications.

== Works ==
- Diecezja żmudzka od XV do początku XVII w[ieku]: uposażenie (Poznań 1992)
- Litwa współczesna (Poznań 1992)
- Diecezja żmudzka od XV do początku XVII wieku: ustrój (Poznań 1993)
- Burza koronacyjna : dramatyczny fragment stosunków polsko-litewskich w XV wieku (Poznań 1998)
- Litwa na przełomie średniowiecza i nowożytności 1492-1569 (Poznań 2002)
- Chrzest Litwy (Poznań 2006)
- Geografia historyczna Wielkiego Księstwa Litewskiego : stan i perspektywy badań (Poznań 2007)
