= Musninkai =

- Town
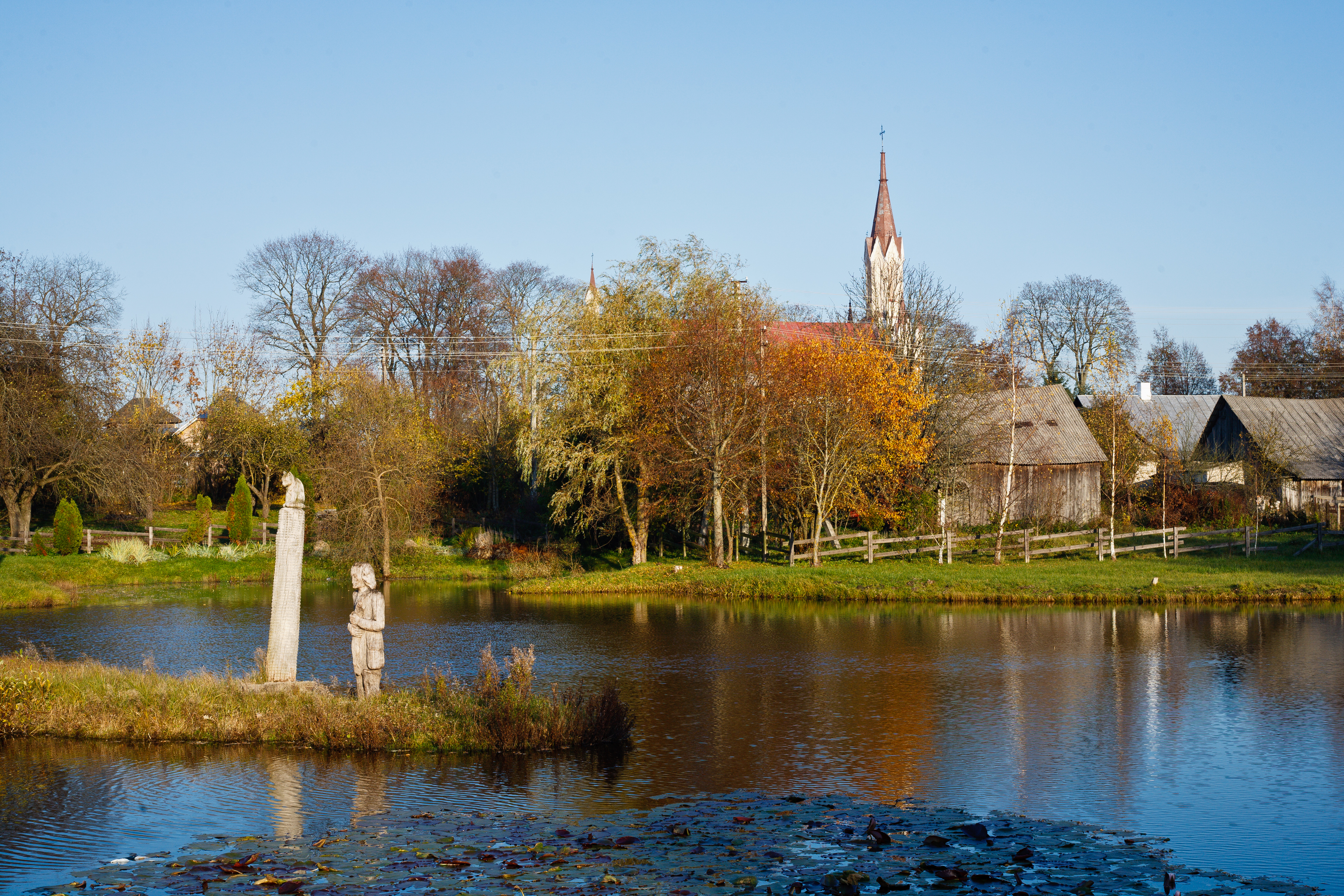

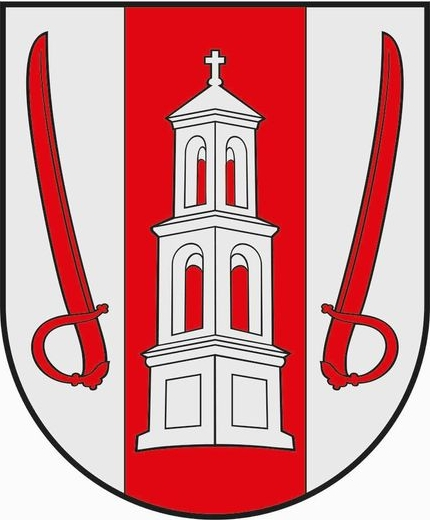
- Coat of arms

- Location of Musninkai
- Coordinates: 54°56′49″N 24°50′31″E
- Country: Lithuania
- County: Vilnius County
- Municipality: Širvintos district municipality
- Eldership: Musninkai eldership

Population (2011)
  - Total: 415
- Time zone: UTC+2 (EET)
  - Summer (DST): UTC+3 (EEST)

Musninkai is a town in Širvintos district municipality, Vilnius County, east Lithuania. According to the Lithuanian census of 2011, the town has a population of 415 people. The town has a Catholic church.

Its alternate names include Muśniki (Polish), Musnikai, Musninkay, and Musnik (Yiddish).
