= Astikai =

Lithuanian noble family

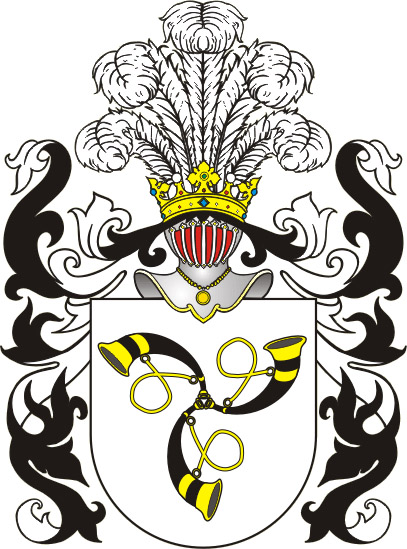
Trąby coat of arms, granted to Kristinas Astikas' family in 1413

Astikai (Latin: Astikus, Polish: Ościk, Ościkowicze or Ostik) was a Lithuanian noble family, that prospered in late 14th and early 17th centuries. Kristinas Astikas, a noble from Kernavė, was the founder of the family. There is some vague evidence, that his father was Sirputis (probably descendant of other Sirputis, brother of Traidenis, Bardis, Liesis, and Svalkenis) and his grandfather was Viršulis, mentioned in chronicles. It is worth to note, that members of Astikai family on different occasions were referred to by these names. One of treaties signed by Kristinas Astikas mentions his father name, Radvila. However, that is the only reliable clue into the genealogy of Astikai family.

== History ==
Astikas name is first mentioned in 1398 in the Treaty of Salynas as castellan of Užpaliai. After Union of Horodło he received Trąby coat of arms. From 1419 until his death in 1442 or 1444, he was castellan of Vilnius. He was a strong supporter of Vytautas the Great and participated in signing of many treaties, including Peace of Thorn in 1411, Treaty of Melno in 1422, and Union of Grodno in 1432.

It is known that Kristinas Astikas had four sons: Radvila, Stanislovas (sometimes also called Stankus), Mikalojus and Baltramiejus. Radvila Astikas (died in 1477) was voivode of Trakai and became an ancestor of a new family, known as Radvilos. Later the name was polonized to Radziwiłł. Since there is nothing known about Mikalojus and Baltramiejus, historians assume they died in their youth. Stanislovas became a voivode of Navahrudak and continued the Astikai family line. His son Gregory became Court Marshal in 1494. As a vicegerent of Anykščiai and Merkinė, he participated in the Battle of Vedrosha in 1500 and was taken prisoner. After he returned, he received his old title of Court Marshal, but his previously owned lands were not returned to him. Instead he received Užpaliai and other territories ruled by his brother Radvila and his sons. From 1510 to his death in 1518 or 1519 Gregory was also a voivode of Trakai.

After Gregory's death, the family started losing its influence and prestige. Gregory had three sons, Gregory, voivode of Navahrudak and castellan of Vilnius who died in 1557, Stanislaw, voivode of Polotsk who died in 1519, and Jurgis, Court Marshal who died in 1546. Only Jurgis had children: sons Mikalojus, Jonas, Gregory, and Jurgis and daughters Joan and Sophie. Mikalojus was starosta of Kreva and Rēzekne. He popularized the theory that Astikai family roots from Sirputis and changed his name to Astikas Sirputis. Another son Jurgis (1530–1579) was starosta of Mstsislaw and Bratslav, and voivode of Smolensk. In 1580 Jurgis' brother Gregory received death sentence because he falsified signatures and money. He was also accused of conspiracy with Moscow to assassinate Stephen Báthory, King of Poland and Grand Duke of Lithuania. Gregory's only son, Jonas, was acquitted. Jonas, a petty officer in Vilnius, was the last recorded member of the Astikai family (died 1609).

== Family tree ==
Sirputis?
Kristinas Astikas | Dargis
Radvila Astikas; Voivode of Trakai; Died in 1477 | Mikalojus (or Micko) | Stanislovas (Stankus); Voivode of Navahrudak | Baltramiejus (or Bardko) | Sudimantas Dargaitis; Starosta of Kreva
Mikalojus Radvila the Old; Voivode of Vilnius; Grand Chancellor; Died 1509 | Anna; Wife of Petka Jogailavičius | Gregory Astikas; Died in 1518/1519 | Anna; Wife of Jurgis Jonaitis Zenovijaitis | Mykolas Kmita; Died after 1461 | Alekna Sudimantaitis; Voivode of Vilnius; Grand Chancellor; Died 1490 | Jonas (Ivaška); Died after 1447
Radvilos family | Jerzy (Jurgis); Court Marshal; Died in 1546 | Gregory; Voivode of Navahrudak; Died 1557 | Stanislaw; Voivode of Polotsk; Died in 1519 | Sophia; Wife of Alexander Olshanski | Alexandra; Wife of Mikołaj Tęczyński | Unknown name Wife of Stanislovas Kęsgaila | Anna; Cistercian nun | Jadviga; Wife of Jonas Kontautaitis & Stanislovas Kęsgaila
Mikolaj; Rittmeister; Died ca. 1566 | Jan | Gregory; Executed in 1580 | Yuri (Jurgis); Voivode of Smolensk; Died in 1579 | Joana (Anna) | Sophia
Jan; Land judge Last member of Astikai
